= List of minor planets: 9001–10000 =

The following is a partial list of minor planets, running from minor-planet number 9001 through 10000, inclusive. The primary data for this and other partial lists is based on JPL's "Small-Body Orbital Elements" and data available from the Minor Planet Center. Critical list information is also provided by the MPC, unless otherwise specified from Lowell Observatory. A detailed description of the table's columns and additional sources are given on the main page including a complete list of every page in this series, and a statistical break-up on the dynamical classification of minor planets.

Also see the summary list of all named bodies in numerical and alphabetical order, and the corresponding naming citations for the number range of this particular list. New namings may only be added to this list after official publication, as the preannouncement of names is condemned by the Working Group for Small Bodies Nomenclature of the International Astronomical Union.

Near-Earth obj.	MBA (inner)	MBA (outer)	Centaur
Mars-crosser	MBA (middle)	Jupiter trojan	Trans-Neptunian obj.
Unclassified

== 9001–9100 ==
Designation			Discovery			Properties		Ref
Permanent	Provisional	Named after	Date	Site	Discoverer(s)	Category	Diam.	Ref
9001 Slettebak	1981 QE_{2}	Slettebak	August 30, 1981	Anderson Mesa	E. Bowell	·	3.7 km (2.3 mi)	MPC · JPL
9002 Gabrynowicz	1981 QV_{2}	Gabrynowicz	August 23, 1981	La Silla	H. Debehogne	·	5.4 km (3.4 mi)	MPC · JPL
9003 Ralphmilliken	1981 UW_{21}	Ralphmilliken	October 24, 1981	Palomar	S. J. Bus	HOF	15 km (9.3 mi)	MPC · JPL
9004 Peekaydee	1982 UZ_{2}	Peekaydee	October 22, 1982	Kitt Peak	G. Aldering	·	14 km (8.7 mi)	MPC · JPL
9005 Sidorova	1982 UU_{5}	Sidorova	October 20, 1982	Nauchnij	L. G. Karachkina	·	12 km (7.5 mi)	MPC · JPL
9006 Voytkevych	1982 UA_{7}	Voytkevych	October 21, 1982	Nauchnij	L. G. Karachkina	EUN · moon	7.6 km (4.7 mi)	MPC · JPL
9007 James Bond	1983 TE_{1}	James Bond	October 5, 1983	Kleť	A. Mrkos	·	3.7 km (2.3 mi)	MPC · JPL
9008 Bohšternberk	1984 BS	Bohšternberk	January 27, 1984	Kleť	A. Mrkos	·	4.5 km (2.8 mi)	MPC · JPL
9009 Tirso	1984 HJ_{1}	Tirso	April 23, 1984	La Silla	V. Zappalà	·	3.5 km (2.2 mi)	MPC · JPL
9010 Candelo	1984 HM_{1}	Candelo	April 27, 1984	La Silla	V. Zappalà	moon	4.7 km (2.9 mi)	MPC · JPL
9011 Angelou	1984 SU	Angelou	September 20, 1984	Kleť	A. Mrkos	·	4.9 km (3.0 mi)	MPC · JPL
9012 Benner	1984 UW	Benner	October 26, 1984	Anderson Mesa	E. Bowell	·	11 km (6.8 mi)	MPC · JPL
9013 Sansaturio	1985 PA_{1}	Sansaturio	August 14, 1985	Anderson Mesa	E. Bowell	·	4.3 km (2.7 mi)	MPC · JPL
9014 Svyatorichter	1985 UG_{5}	Svyatorichter	October 22, 1985	Nauchnij	L. V. Zhuravleva	·	3.8 km (2.4 mi)	MPC · JPL
9015 Coe	1985 VK	Coe	November 14, 1985	Brorfelde	P. Jensen	·	17 km (11 mi)	MPC · JPL
9016 Henrymoore	1986 AE	Henrymoore	January 10, 1986	Palomar	C. S. Shoemaker, E. M. Shoemaker	·	8.2 km (5.1 mi)	MPC · JPL
9017 Babadzhanyan	1986 TW_{9}	Babadzhanyan	October 2, 1986	Nauchnij	L. V. Zhuravleva	·	4.5 km (2.8 mi)	MPC · JPL
9018 Galache	1987 JG	Galache	May 5, 1987	Lake Tekapo	A. C. Gilmore, P. M. Kilmartin	V	3.2 km (2.0 mi)	MPC · JPL
9019 Eucommia	1987 QF_{3}	Eucommia	August 28, 1987	La Silla	E. W. Elst	·	5.1 km (3.2 mi)	MPC · JPL
9020 Eucryphia	1987 SG_{2}	Eucryphia	September 19, 1987	Smolyan	E. W. Elst	·	5.0 km (3.1 mi)	MPC · JPL
9021 Fagus	1988 CT_{5}	Fagus	February 14, 1988	La Silla	E. W. Elst	EUN	13 km (8.1 mi)	MPC · JPL
9022 Drake	1988 PC_{1}	Drake	August 14, 1988	Palomar	C. S. Shoemaker, E. M. Shoemaker	·	7.0 km (4.3 mi)	MPC · JPL
9023 Mnesthus	1988 RG_{1}	Mnesthus	September 10, 1988	Palomar	C. S. Shoemaker, E. M. Shoemaker	L5	49 km (30 mi)	MPC · JPL
9024 Gunnargraps	1988 RF_{9}	Gunnargraps	September 5, 1988	La Silla	H. Debehogne	·	2.6 km (1.6 mi)	MPC · JPL
9025 Polanskey	1988 SM_{2}	Polanskey	September 16, 1988	Cerro Tololo	S. J. Bus	THM	9.1 km (5.7 mi)	MPC · JPL
9026 Denevi	1988 ST_{2}	Denevi	September 16, 1988	Cerro Tololo	S. J. Bus	THM	11 km (6.8 mi)	MPC · JPL
9027 Graps	1988 VP_{5}	Graps	November 4, 1988	Kleť	A. Mrkos	·	3.1 km (1.9 mi)	MPC · JPL
9028 Konrádbeneš	1989 BE_{1}	Konrádbeneš	January 26, 1989	Kleť	A. Mrkos	NYS	11 km (6.8 mi)	MPC · JPL
9029	1989 GM	—	April 6, 1989	Palomar	E. F. Helin	·	5.3 km (3.3 mi)	MPC · JPL
9030 Othryoneus	1989 UX_{5}	Othryoneus	October 30, 1989	Cerro Tololo	S. J. Bus	L5	32 km (20 mi)	MPC · JPL
9031	1989 WG_{4}	—	November 29, 1989	Kleť	A. Mrkos	·	3.1 km (1.9 mi)	MPC · JPL
9032 Tanakami	1989 WK_{4}	Tanakami	November 23, 1989	Geisei	T. Seki	·	3.5 km (2.2 mi)	MPC · JPL
9033 Kawane	1990 AD	Kawane	January 4, 1990	Susono	M. Akiyama, T. Furuta	·	16 km (9.9 mi)	MPC · JPL
9034 Oleyuria	1990 QZ_{17}	Oleyuria	August 26, 1990	Nauchnij	L. V. Zhuravleva	·	11 km (6.8 mi)	MPC · JPL
9035	1990 SH_{1}	—	September 16, 1990	Palomar	H. E. Holt	CLO	10 km (6.2 mi)	MPC · JPL
9036	1990 SJ_{16}	—	September 17, 1990	Palomar	H. E. Holt	·	6.0 km (3.7 mi)	MPC · JPL
9037	1990 UJ_{2}	—	October 20, 1990	Dynic	A. Sugie	·	10 km (6.2 mi)	MPC · JPL
9038 Helensteel	1990 VE_{1}	Helensteel	November 12, 1990	Siding Spring	D. I. Steel	EUN	5.9 km (3.7 mi)	MPC · JPL
9039	1990 WB_{4}	—	November 16, 1990	Kani	Y. Mizuno, T. Furuta	EOS	11 km (6.8 mi)	MPC · JPL
9040 Flacourtia	1991 BH_{1}	Flacourtia	January 18, 1991	Haute-Provence	E. W. Elst	·	10 km (6.2 mi)	MPC · JPL
9041 Takane	1991 CX	Takane	February 9, 1991	Kiyosato	S. Otomo, O. Muramatsu	·	2.3 km (1.4 mi)	MPC · JPL
9042	1991 EN_{2}	—	March 11, 1991	La Silla	H. Debehogne	KOR	6.9 km (4.3 mi)	MPC · JPL
9043	1991 EJ_{4}	—	March 12, 1991	La Silla	H. Debehogne	·	24 km (15 mi)	MPC · JPL
9044 Kaoru	1991 KA	Kaoru	May 18, 1991	Kiyosato	S. Otomo, O. Muramatsu	·	4.6 km (2.9 mi)	MPC · JPL
9045	1991 PG_{15}	—	August 7, 1991	Palomar	H. E. Holt	·	6.3 km (3.9 mi)	MPC · JPL
9046	1991 PG_{17}	—	August 9, 1991	Palomar	H. E. Holt	PHO	5.1 km (3.2 mi)	MPC · JPL
9047	1991 QF	—	August 30, 1991	Siding Spring	R. H. McNaught	(887)	4.4 km (2.7 mi)	MPC · JPL
9048	1991 RD_{24}	—	September 12, 1991	Palomar	H. E. Holt	·	4.4 km (2.7 mi)	MPC · JPL
9049	1991 RQ_{27}	—	September 12, 1991	Palomar	H. E. Holt	·	6.9 km (4.3 mi)	MPC · JPL
9050	1991 RF_{29}	—	September 13, 1991	Palomar	H. E. Holt	·	8.6 km (5.3 mi)	MPC · JPL
9051	1991 UG_{3}	—	October 31, 1991	Kushiro	S. Ueda, H. Kaneda	·	6.0 km (3.7 mi)	MPC · JPL
9052 Uhland	1991 UJ_{4}	Uhland	October 30, 1991	Tautenburg Observatory	F. Börngen	NYS	8.1 km (5.0 mi)	MPC · JPL
9053 Hamamelis	1991 VW_{5}	Hamamelis	November 2, 1991	La Silla	E. W. Elst	RAF	5.8 km (3.6 mi)	MPC · JPL
9054 Hippocastanum	1991 YO	Hippocastanum	December 30, 1991	Haute-Provence	E. W. Elst	EUN · slow	6.1 km (3.8 mi)	MPC · JPL
9055 Edvardsson	1992 DP_{8}	Edvardsson	February 29, 1992	La Silla	UESAC	·	7.7 km (4.8 mi)	MPC · JPL
9056 Piskunov	1992 EQ_{14}	Piskunov	March 1, 1992	La Silla	UESAC	AGN	5.3 km (3.3 mi)	MPC · JPL
9057	1992 HA_{5}	—	April 24, 1992	La Silla	H. Debehogne	THM	16 km (9.9 mi)	MPC · JPL
9058	1992 JB	—	May 1, 1992	Palomar	J. Alu, K. J. Lawrence	APO +1 km (0.62 mi)	970 m (3,180 ft)	MPC · JPL
9059 Dumas	1992 PJ	Dumas	August 8, 1992	Caussols	E. W. Elst	·	3.2 km (2.0 mi)	MPC · JPL
9060 Toyokawa	1992 RM	Toyokawa	September 4, 1992	Kiyosato	S. Otomo	·	3.6 km (2.2 mi)	MPC · JPL
9061	1992 WC_{3}	—	November 18, 1992	Dynic	A. Sugie	·	5.6 km (3.5 mi)	MPC · JPL
9062 Ohnishi	1992 WO_{5}	Ohnishi	November 27, 1992	Geisei	T. Seki	·	5.1 km (3.2 mi)	MPC · JPL
9063 Washi	1992 YS	Washi	December 17, 1992	Geisei	T. Seki	·	3.4 km (2.1 mi)	MPC · JPL
9064 Johndavies	1993 BH_{8}	Johndavies	January 21, 1993	Kitt Peak	Spacewatch	slow	4.0 km (2.5 mi)	MPC · JPL
9065	1993 FN_{1}	—	March 25, 1993	Kushiro	S. Ueda, H. Kaneda	·	8.8 km (5.5 mi)	MPC · JPL
9066	1993 FR_{34}	—	March 19, 1993	La Silla	UESAC	·	9.6 km (6.0 mi)	MPC · JPL
9067 Katsuno	1993 HR	Katsuno	April 16, 1993	Kitami	K. Endate, K. Watanabe	·	8.1 km (5.0 mi)	MPC · JPL
9068	1993 OD	—	July 16, 1993	Palomar	E. F. Helin	H	3.9 km (2.4 mi)	MPC · JPL
9069 Hovland	1993 OV	Hovland	July 16, 1993	Palomar	E. F. Helin	H · moon	3.0 km (1.9 mi)	MPC · JPL
9070 Ensab	1993 OZ_{2}	Ensab	July 23, 1993	Palomar	C. S. Shoemaker, D. H. Levy	·	6.1 km (3.8 mi)	MPC · JPL
9071 Coudenberghe	1993 OB_{13}	Coudenberghe	July 19, 1993	La Silla	E. W. Elst	·	7.2 km (4.5 mi)	MPC · JPL
9072	1993 RX_{3}	—	September 12, 1993	Palomar	PCAS	URS	24 km (15 mi)	MPC · JPL
9073 Yoshinori	1994 ER	Yoshinori	March 4, 1994	Ōizumi	T. Kobayashi	BAP	4.1 km (2.5 mi)	MPC · JPL
9074 Yosukeyoshida	1994 FZ	Yosukeyoshida	March 31, 1994	Kitami	K. Endate, K. Watanabe	ERI · slow	9.4 km (5.8 mi)	MPC · JPL
9075	1994 GD_{9}	—	April 14, 1994	Palomar	E. F. Helin	·	3.0 km (1.9 mi)	MPC · JPL
9076 Shinsaku	1994 JT	Shinsaku	May 8, 1994	Kuma Kogen	A. Nakamura	V	2.0 km (1.2 mi)	MPC · JPL
9077 Ildo	1994 NC	Ildo	July 3, 1994	Farra d'Isonzo	Farra d'Isonzo	·	4.9 km (3.0 mi)	MPC · JPL
9078	1994 PB_{2}	—	August 9, 1994	Palomar	PCAS	KOR	6.8 km (4.2 mi)	MPC · JPL
9079 Gesner	1994 PC_{34}	Gesner	August 10, 1994	La Silla	E. W. Elst	EOS	8.8 km (5.5 mi)	MPC · JPL
9080 Takayanagi	1994 TP	Takayanagi	October 2, 1994	Kitami	K. Endate, K. Watanabe	·	11 km (6.8 mi)	MPC · JPL
9081 Hideakianno	1994 VY	Hideakianno	November 3, 1994	Kuma Kogen	A. Nakamura	EOS	5.3 km (3.3 mi)	MPC · JPL
9082 Leonardmartin	1994 VR_{6}	Leonardmartin	November 4, 1994	Palomar	C. S. Shoemaker, E. M. Shoemaker	·	7.0 km (4.3 mi)	MPC · JPL
9083 Ramboehm	1994 WC_{4}	Ramboehm	November 28, 1994	Palomar	C. S. Shoemaker, D. H. Levy	MAR	8.7 km (5.4 mi)	MPC · JPL
9084 Achristou	1995 CS_{1}	Achristou	February 3, 1995	Siding Spring	D. J. Asher	H	1.9 km (1.2 mi)	MPC · JPL
9085	1995 QH_{2}	—	August 24, 1995	Nachi-Katsuura	Y. Shimizu, T. Urata	·	2.4 km (1.5 mi)	MPC · JPL
9086	1995 SA_{3}	—	September 20, 1995	Kushiro	S. Ueda, H. Kaneda	·	7.4 km (4.6 mi)	MPC · JPL
9087 Neff	1995 SN_{3}	Neff	September 29, 1995	Kleť	Kleť	·	2.6 km (1.6 mi)	MPC · JPL
9088 Maki	1995 SX_{3}	Maki	September 20, 1995	Kitami	K. Endate, K. Watanabe	·	3.9 km (2.4 mi)	MPC · JPL
9089	1995 UC_{7}	—	October 26, 1995	Nachi-Katsuura	Y. Shimizu, T. Urata	V	4.2 km (2.6 mi)	MPC · JPL
9090 Chirotenmondai	1995 UW_{8}	Chirotenmondai	October 28, 1995	Kitami	K. Endate, K. Watanabe	·	18 km (11 mi)	MPC · JPL
9091 Ishidatakaki	1995 VK	Ishidatakaki	November 2, 1995	Ōizumi	T. Kobayashi	NYS	4.3 km (2.7 mi)	MPC · JPL
9092 Nanyang	1995 VU_{18}	Nanyang	November 4, 1995	Xinglong	SCAP	EOS	17 km (11 mi)	MPC · JPL
9093 Sorada	1995 WA	Sorada	November 16, 1995	Ōizumi	T. Kobayashi	·	7.0 km (4.3 mi)	MPC · JPL
9094 Butsuen	1995 WH	Butsuen	November 16, 1995	Ōizumi	T. Kobayashi	·	9.2 km (5.7 mi)	MPC · JPL
9095	1995 WT_{2}	—	November 16, 1995	Kushiro	S. Ueda, H. Kaneda	·	3.0 km (1.9 mi)	MPC · JPL
9096 Tamotsu	1995 XE_{1}	Tamotsu	December 15, 1995	Ōizumi	T. Kobayashi	·	14 km (8.7 mi)	MPC · JPL
9097 Davidschlag	1996 AU_{1}	Davidschlag	January 14, 1996	Linz	Linz	THM	12 km (7.5 mi)	MPC · JPL
9098 Toshihiko	1996 BQ_{3}	Toshihiko	January 27, 1996	Ōizumi	T. Kobayashi	·	7.1 km (4.4 mi)	MPC · JPL
9099 Kenjitanabe	1996 VN_{3}	Kenjitanabe	November 6, 1996	Ōizumi	T. Kobayashi	(3460)	10 km (6.2 mi)	MPC · JPL
9100 Tomohisa	1996 XU_{1}	Tomohisa	December 2, 1996	Ōizumi	T. Kobayashi	·	5.5 km (3.4 mi)	MPC · JPL

== 9101–9200 ==
back to top

Designation			Discovery			Properties		Ref
Permanent	Provisional	Named after	Date	Site	Discoverer(s)	Category	Diam.	Ref
9101 Rossiglione	1996 XG_{2}	Rossiglione	December 3, 1996	Farra d'Isonzo	Farra d'Isonzo	·	2.2 km (1.4 mi)	MPC · JPL
9102 Foglar	1996 XS_{18}	Foglar	December 12, 1996	Kleť	M. Tichý, Z. Moravec	·	8.7 km (5.4 mi)	MPC · JPL
9103 Komatsubara	1996 XW_{30}	Komatsubara	December 14, 1996	Oizumi	T. Kobayashi	·	4.3 km (2.7 mi)	MPC · JPL
9104 Matsuo	1996 YB	Matsuo	December 20, 1996	Oizumi	T. Kobayashi	DOR	8.6 km (5.3 mi)	MPC · JPL
9105 Matsumura	1997 AU	Matsumura	January 2, 1997	Oizumi	T. Kobayashi	KOR	5.3 km (3.3 mi)	MPC · JPL
9106 Yatagarasu	1997 AY_{1}	Yatagarasu	January 3, 1997	Oizumi	T. Kobayashi	·	8.5 km (5.3 mi)	MPC · JPL
9107 Narukospa	1997 AE_{4}	Narukospa	January 6, 1997	Oizumi	T. Kobayashi	·	19 km (12 mi)	MPC · JPL
9108 Toruyusa	1997 AZ_{6}	Toruyusa	January 9, 1997	Oizumi	T. Kobayashi	·	3.2 km (2.0 mi)	MPC · JPL
9109 Yukomotizuki	1997 AH_{7}	Yukomotizuki	January 9, 1997	Oizumi	T. Kobayashi	V	2.6 km (1.6 mi)	MPC · JPL
9110 Choukai	1997 AM_{19}	Choukai	January 13, 1997	Nanyo	T. Okuni	·	4.7 km (2.9 mi)	MPC · JPL
9111 Matarazzo	1997 BD_{2}	Matarazzo	January 28, 1997	Sormano	P. Sicoli, F. Manca	·	5.9 km (3.7 mi)	MPC · JPL
9112 Hatsulars	1997 BU_{3}	Hatsulars	January 31, 1997	Oizumi	T. Kobayashi	THM	13 km (8.1 mi)	MPC · JPL
9113	1997 CN_{5}	—	February 3, 1997	Nachi-Katsuura	Y. Shimizu, T. Urata	·	5.9 km (3.7 mi)	MPC · JPL
9114 Hatakeyama	1997 CU_{19}	Hatakeyama	February 12, 1997	Oizumi	T. Kobayashi	·	5.5 km (3.4 mi)	MPC · JPL
9115 Battisti	1997 DG	Battisti	February 27, 1997	Sormano	P. Sicoli, F. Manca	·	5.7 km (3.5 mi)	MPC · JPL
9116 Billhamilton	1997 ES_{40}	Billhamilton	March 7, 1997	Anderson Mesa	M. W. Buie	·	3.5 km (2.2 mi)	MPC · JPL
9117 Aude	1997 FR_{1}	Aude	March 27, 1997	Martigues	Morata, D., Morata, S.	·	6.5 km (4.0 mi)	MPC · JPL
9118	1997 GD_{20}	—	April 5, 1997	Socorro	LINEAR	·	7.8 km (4.8 mi)	MPC · JPL
9119 Georgpeuerbach	1998 DT	Georgpeuerbach	February 18, 1998	Linz	Linz	·	8.7 km (5.4 mi)	MPC · JPL
9120	1998 DR_{8}	—	February 22, 1998	Xinglong	SCAP	·	5.5 km (3.4 mi)	MPC · JPL
9121 Stefanovalentini	1998 DJ_{11}	Stefanovalentini	February 24, 1998	Colleverde	V. S. Casulli	3:2	40 km (25 mi)	MPC · JPL
9122 Hunten	1998 FZ_{8}	Hunten	March 22, 1998	Kitt Peak	Spacewatch	KOR ·	4.0 km (2.5 mi)	MPC · JPL
9123 Yoshiko	1998 FQ_{11}	Yoshiko	March 24, 1998	Gekko	T. Kagawa	·	11 km (6.8 mi)	MPC · JPL
9124	1998 FR_{60}	—	March 20, 1998	Socorro	LINEAR	KOR	4.8 km (3.0 mi)	MPC · JPL
9125	1998 FT_{62}	—	March 20, 1998	Socorro	LINEAR	·	3.4 km (2.1 mi)	MPC · JPL
9126 Samcoulson	1998 FR_{64}	Samcoulson	March 20, 1998	Socorro	LINEAR	·	2.8 km (1.7 mi)	MPC · JPL
9127 Brucekoehn	1998 HX_{51}	Brucekoehn	April 30, 1998	Anderson Mesa	LONEOS	·	9.5 km (5.9 mi)	MPC · JPL
9128 Takatumuzi	1998 HQ_{52}	Takatumuzi	April 30, 1998	Nanyo	T. Okuni	·	4.7 km (2.9 mi)	MPC · JPL
9129	1998 HU_{144}	—	April 21, 1998	Socorro	LINEAR	·	8.5 km (5.3 mi)	MPC · JPL
9130 Galois	1998 HQ_{148}	Galois	April 25, 1998	La Silla	E. W. Elst	NYS	5.9 km (3.7 mi)	MPC · JPL
9131	1998 JV	—	May 1, 1998	Haleakalā	NEAT	NYS	3.5 km (2.2 mi)	MPC · JPL
9132 Walteranderson	2821 P-L	Walteranderson	September 24, 1960	Palomar	C. J. van Houten, I. van Houten-Groeneveld, T. Gehrels	THM	16 km (9.9 mi)	MPC · JPL
9133 d'Arrest	3107 P-L	d'Arrest	September 25, 1960	Palomar	C. J. van Houten, I. van Houten-Groeneveld, T. Gehrels	EUN	4.4 km (2.7 mi)	MPC · JPL
9134 Encke	4822 P-L	Encke	September 24, 1960	Palomar	C. J. van Houten, I. van Houten-Groeneveld, T. Gehrels	·	6.4 km (4.0 mi)	MPC · JPL
9135 Lacaille	7609 P-L	Lacaille	October 17, 1960	Palomar	C. J. van Houten, I. van Houten-Groeneveld, T. Gehrels	·	2.9 km (1.8 mi)	MPC · JPL
9136 Lalande	4886 T-1	Lalande	May 13, 1971	Palomar	C. J. van Houten, I. van Houten-Groeneveld, T. Gehrels	V	3.7 km (2.3 mi)	MPC · JPL
9137 Remo	2114 T-2	Remo	September 29, 1973	Palomar	C. J. van Houten, I. van Houten-Groeneveld, T. Gehrels	·	4.3 km (2.7 mi)	MPC · JPL
9138 Murdoch	2280 T-2	Murdoch	September 29, 1973	Palomar	C. J. van Houten, I. van Houten-Groeneveld, T. Gehrels	·	3.1 km (1.9 mi)	MPC · JPL
9139 Barrylasker	4180 T-2	Barrylasker	September 29, 1973	Palomar	C. J. van Houten, I. van Houten-Groeneveld, T. Gehrels	·	4.2 km (2.6 mi)	MPC · JPL
9140 Deni	4195 T-3	Deni	October 16, 1977	Palomar	C. J. van Houten, I. van Houten-Groeneveld, T. Gehrels	PHO	4.1 km (2.5 mi)	MPC · JPL
9141 Kapur	5174 T-3	Kapur	October 16, 1977	Palomar	C. J. van Houten, I. van Houten-Groeneveld, T. Gehrels	·	21 km (13 mi)	MPC · JPL
9142 Rhesus	5191 T-3	Rhesus	October 16, 1977	Palomar	C. J. van Houten, I. van Houten-Groeneveld, T. Gehrels	L5	42 km (26 mi)	MPC · JPL
9143 Burkhead	1955 SF	Burkhead	September 16, 1955	Brooklyn	Indiana University	·	4.4 km (2.7 mi)	MPC · JPL
9144 Hollisjohnson	1955 UN_{1}	Hollisjohnson	October 25, 1955	Brooklyn	Indiana University	·	11 km (6.8 mi)	MPC · JPL
9145 Shustov	1976 GG_{3}	Shustov	April 1, 1976	Nauchnij	N. S. Chernykh	EUN	8.0 km (5.0 mi)	MPC · JPL
9146 Tulikov	1976 YG_{1}	Tulikov	December 16, 1976	Nauchnij	L. I. Chernykh	·	7.0 km (4.3 mi)	MPC · JPL
9147 Kourakuen	1977 DD_{1}	Kourakuen	February 18, 1977	Kiso	H. Kosai, K. Furukawa	·	4.9 km (3.0 mi)	MPC · JPL
9148 Boriszaitsev	1977 EL_{1}	Boriszaitsev	March 13, 1977	Nauchnij	N. S. Chernykh	·	3.7 km (2.3 mi)	MPC · JPL
9149	1977 TD_{1}	—	October 12, 1977	Zimmerwald	P. Wild	EUN	7.2 km (4.5 mi)	MPC · JPL
9150 Zavolokin	1978 SE_{1}	Zavolokin	September 27, 1978	Nauchnij	L. I. Chernykh	fast	5.2 km (3.2 mi)	MPC · JPL
9151 Kettnergriswold	1979 MQ_{8}	Kettnergriswold	June 25, 1979	Siding Spring	E. F. Helin, S. J. Bus	·	4.7 km (2.9 mi)	MPC · JPL
9152 Combe	1980 VZ_{2}	Combe	November 1, 1980	Palomar	S. J. Bus	ERI	5.0 km (3.1 mi)	MPC · JPL
9153 Chikurinji	1981 UD_{2}	Chikurinji	October 30, 1981	Kiso	H. Kosai, K. Furukawa	EUN	7.2 km (4.5 mi)	MPC · JPL
9154 Kolʹtsovo	1982 SP_{6}	Kolʹtsovo	September 16, 1982	Nauchnij	L. I. Chernykh	EOS	9.9 km (6.2 mi)	MPC · JPL
9155 Verkhodanov	1982 SM_{7}	Verkhodanov	September 18, 1982	Nauchnij	N. S. Chernykh	·	10 km (6.2 mi)	MPC · JPL
9156 Malanin	1982 TQ_{2}	Malanin	October 15, 1982	Nauchnij	L. V. Zhuravleva	·	3.6 km (2.2 mi)	MPC · JPL
9157	1983 RB_{4}	—	September 2, 1983	Anderson Mesa	N. G. Thomas	NYS	5.0 km (3.1 mi)	MPC · JPL
9158 Platè	1984 MR	Platè	June 25, 1984	Nauchnij	T. M. Smirnova	V	4.7 km (2.9 mi)	MPC · JPL
9159 McDonnell	1984 UD_{3}	McDonnell	October 26, 1984	Anderson Mesa	E. Bowell	V	3.5 km (2.2 mi)	MPC · JPL
9160	1986 UH_{3}	—	October 28, 1986	Kleť	Z. Vávrová	·	5.5 km (3.4 mi)	MPC · JPL
9161 Beaufort	1987 BZ_{1}	Beaufort	January 26, 1987	La Silla	E. W. Elst	·	6.3 km (3.9 mi)	MPC · JPL
9162 Kwiila	1987 OA	Kwiila	July 29, 1987	Palomar	J. E. Mueller	APO +1 km (0.62 mi)	1.1 km (0.68 mi)	MPC · JPL
9163	1987 RB_{1}	—	September 13, 1987	La Silla	H. Debehogne	THM	9.0 km (5.6 mi)	MPC · JPL
9164 Colbert	1987 SQ	Colbert	September 19, 1987	Anderson Mesa	E. Bowell	HYG	14 km (8.7 mi)	MPC · JPL
9165 Raup	1987 SJ_{3}	Raup	September 27, 1987	Palomar	C. S. Shoemaker, E. M. Shoemaker	H · slow	4.8 km (3.0 mi)	MPC · JPL
9166	1987 SC_{6}	—	September 21, 1987	Kleť	Z. Vávrová	THM	9.4 km (5.8 mi)	MPC · JPL
9167 Kharkiv	1987 SS_{17}	Kharkiv	September 18, 1987	Nauchnij	L. I. Chernykh	·	18 km (11 mi)	MPC · JPL
9168 Sarov	1987 ST_{17}	Sarov	September 18, 1987	Nauchnij	L. I. Chernykh	·	5.8 km (3.6 mi)	MPC · JPL
9169	1988 TL_{1}	—	October 13, 1988	Kushiro	S. Ueda, H. Kaneda	·	3.8 km (2.4 mi)	MPC · JPL
9170	1988 TG_{5}	—	October 3, 1988	Kushiro	S. Ueda, H. Kaneda	·	3.9 km (2.4 mi)	MPC · JPL
9171 Carolyndiane	1989 GD_{5}	Carolyndiane	April 4, 1989	La Silla	E. W. Elst	MAR	7.3 km (4.5 mi)	MPC · JPL
9172 Abhramu	1989 OB	Abhramu	July 29, 1989	Palomar	C. S. Shoemaker, E. M. Shoemaker	AMO +1 km (0.62 mi)	1.7 km (1.1 mi)	MPC · JPL
9173 Viola Castello	1989 TZ_{15}	Viola Castello	October 4, 1989	La Silla	H. Debehogne	GEF	8.2 km (5.1 mi)	MPC · JPL
9174	1989 WC_{3}	—	November 27, 1989	Gekko	Y. Oshima	·	3.8 km (2.4 mi)	MPC · JPL
9175 Graun	1990 OO_{2}	Graun	July 29, 1990	Palomar	H. E. Holt	MAR	7.9 km (4.9 mi)	MPC · JPL
9176 Struchkova	1990 VC_{15}	Struchkova	November 15, 1990	Nauchnij	L. I. Chernykh	·	7.2 km (4.5 mi)	MPC · JPL
9177 Donsaari	1990 YA	Donsaari	December 18, 1990	Palomar	E. F. Helin	·	5.6 km (3.5 mi)	MPC · JPL
9178 Momoyo	1991 DU	Momoyo	February 23, 1991	Karasuyama	S. Inoda, T. Urata	KOR	5.6 km (3.5 mi)	MPC · JPL
9179 Satchmo	1991 EM_{1}	Satchmo	March 13, 1991	Harvard Observatory	Oak Ridge Observatory	EOS	8.9 km (5.5 mi)	MPC · JPL
9180 Samsagan	1991 GQ	Samsagan	April 8, 1991	Palomar	E. F. Helin	URS	16 km (9.9 mi)	MPC · JPL
9181	1991 NP_{2}	—	July 14, 1991	Palomar	H. E. Holt	·	3.9 km (2.4 mi)	MPC · JPL
9182	1991 NB_{4}	—	July 8, 1991	La Silla	H. Debehogne	·	6.8 km (4.2 mi)	MPC · JPL
9183	1991 OW	—	July 18, 1991	Palomar	H. E. Holt	·	2.8 km (1.7 mi)	MPC · JPL
9184 Vasilij	1991 PJ_{3}	Vasilij	August 2, 1991	La Silla	E. W. Elst	·	4.4 km (2.7 mi)	MPC · JPL
9185	1991 PX_{17}	—	August 7, 1991	Palomar	H. E. Holt	V	4.4 km (2.7 mi)	MPC · JPL
9186 Fumikotsukimoto	1991 RZ_{1}	Fumikotsukimoto	September 7, 1991	Palomar	E. F. Helin	PHO	4.3 km (2.7 mi)	MPC · JPL
9187 Walterkröll	1991 RD_{4}	Walterkröll	September 12, 1991	Tautenburg Observatory	L. D. Schmadel, F. Börngen	·	4.7 km (2.9 mi)	MPC · JPL
9188	1991 RM_{15}	—	September 15, 1991	Palomar	H. E. Holt	·	5.6 km (3.5 mi)	MPC · JPL
9189 Hölderlin	1991 RH_{41}	Hölderlin	September 10, 1991	Tautenburg Observatory	F. Börngen	·	6.1 km (3.8 mi)	MPC · JPL
9190 Masako	1991 VR_{1}	Masako	November 4, 1991	Yatsugatake	Y. Kushida, O. Muramatsu	·	11 km (6.8 mi)	MPC · JPL
9191 Hokuto	1991 XU	Hokuto	December 13, 1991	Kiyosato	S. Otomo	EUN	8.6 km (5.3 mi)	MPC · JPL
9192	1992 AR_{1}	—	January 14, 1992	Kushiro	S. Ueda, H. Kaneda	·	12 km (7.5 mi)	MPC · JPL
9193 Geoffreycopland	1992 ED_{1}	Geoffreycopland	March 10, 1992	Siding Spring	D. I. Steel	EUN	7.6 km (4.7 mi)	MPC · JPL
9194 Ananoff	1992 OV_{2}	Ananoff	July 26, 1992	La Silla	E. W. Elst	·	3.7 km (2.3 mi)	MPC · JPL
9195	1992 OF_{9}	—	July 26, 1992	La Silla	H. Debehogne, Á. López-G.	THM	13 km (8.1 mi)	MPC · JPL
9196 Sukagawa	1992 WP_{5}	Sukagawa	November 27, 1992	Geisei	T. Seki	·	4.7 km (2.9 mi)	MPC · JPL
9197 Endo	1992 WH_{8}	Endo	November 24, 1992	Nyukasa	M. Hirasawa, S. Suzuki	·	3.2 km (2.0 mi)	MPC · JPL
9198 Sasagamine	1993 BJ_{3}	Sasagamine	January 25, 1993	Geisei	T. Seki	·	3.6 km (2.2 mi)	MPC · JPL
9199	1993 FO_{1}	—	March 25, 1993	Kushiro	S. Ueda, H. Kaneda	·	9.0 km (5.6 mi)	MPC · JPL
9200	1993 FK_{21}	—	March 21, 1993	La Silla	UESAC	NYS	8.8 km (5.5 mi)	MPC · JPL

== 9201–9300 ==
back to top

Designation			Discovery			Properties		Ref
Permanent	Provisional	Named after	Date	Site	Discoverer(s)	Category	Diam.	Ref
9201	1993 FU_{39}	—	March 19, 1993	La Silla	UESAC	·	14 km (8.7 mi)	MPC · JPL
9202	1993 PB	—	August 13, 1993	Kitt Peak	Spacewatch	APO +1 km (0.62 mi)	1.6 km (0.99 mi)	MPC · JPL
9203 Myrtus	1993 TM_{16}	Myrtus	October 9, 1993	La Silla	E. W. Elst	THM	18 km (11 mi)	MPC · JPL
9204 Mörike	1994 PZ_{1}	Mörike	August 4, 1994	Tautenburg Observatory	F. Börngen	V	5.2 km (3.2 mi)	MPC · JPL
9205 Eddywally	1994 PO_{9}	Eddywally	August 10, 1994	La Silla	E. W. Elst	THM	13 km (8.1 mi)	MPC · JPL
9206 Yanaikeizo	1994 RQ	Yanaikeizo	September 1, 1994	Kitami	K. Endate, K. Watanabe	·	3.4 km (2.1 mi)	MPC · JPL
9207 Petersmith	1994 SF_{12}	Petersmith	September 29, 1994	Kitt Peak	Spacewatch	·	6.3 km (3.9 mi)	MPC · JPL
9208 Takanotoshi	1994 TX_{2}	Takanotoshi	October 2, 1994	Kitami	K. Endate, K. Watanabe	·	7.8 km (4.8 mi)	MPC · JPL
9209	1994 UK_{1}	—	October 25, 1994	Kushiro	S. Ueda, H. Kaneda	·	11 km (6.8 mi)	MPC · JPL
9210	1995 BW_{2}	—	January 27, 1995	Kushiro	S. Ueda, H. Kaneda	·	8.6 km (5.3 mi)	MPC · JPL
9211 Neese	1995 SB_{27}	Neese	September 19, 1995	Kitt Peak	Spacewatch	·	5.9 km (3.7 mi)	MPC · JPL
9212 Kanamaru	1995 UR_{3}	Kanamaru	October 20, 1995	Oizumi	T. Kobayashi	V	2.9 km (1.8 mi)	MPC · JPL
9213	1995 UX_{5}	—	October 21, 1995	Kushiro	S. Ueda, H. Kaneda	V	3.0 km (1.9 mi)	MPC · JPL
9214	1995 UC_{6}	—	October 21, 1995	Kushiro	S. Ueda, H. Kaneda	·	4.6 km (2.9 mi)	MPC · JPL
9215 Taiyonoto	1995 UB_{45}	Taiyonoto	October 28, 1995	Kitami	K. Endate, K. Watanabe	·	4.3 km (2.7 mi)	MPC · JPL
9216 Masuzawa	1995 VS	Masuzawa	November 1, 1995	Kiyosato	S. Otomo	·	4.1 km (2.5 mi)	MPC · JPL
9217 Kitagawa	1995 WN	Kitagawa	November 16, 1995	Oizumi	T. Kobayashi	·	2.3 km (1.4 mi)	MPC · JPL
9218 Ishiikazuo	1995 WV_{2}	Ishiikazuo	November 20, 1995	Oizumi	T. Kobayashi	·	3.7 km (2.3 mi)	MPC · JPL
9219	1995 WO_{8}	—	November 18, 1995	Nachi-Katsuura	Y. Shimizu, T. Urata	·	19 km (12 mi)	MPC · JPL
9220 Yoshidayama	1995 XL_{1}	Yoshidayama	December 15, 1995	Oizumi	T. Kobayashi	V	3.5 km (2.2 mi)	MPC · JPL
9221 Wuliangyong	1995 XP_{2}	Wuliangyong	December 2, 1995	Xinglong	SCAP	·	3.0 km (1.9 mi)	MPC · JPL
9222 Chubey	1995 YM	Chubey	December 19, 1995	Oizumi	T. Kobayashi	TIR	10 km (6.2 mi)	MPC · JPL
9223 Leifandersson	1995 YY_{7}	Leifandersson	December 18, 1995	Kitt Peak	Spacewatch	·	4.5 km (2.8 mi)	MPC · JPL
9224 Železný	1996 AE	Železný	January 10, 1996	Kleť	M. Tichý, Z. Moravec	·	4.7 km (2.9 mi)	MPC · JPL
9225 Daiki	1996 AU	Daiki	January 10, 1996	Oizumi	T. Kobayashi	·	5.0 km (3.1 mi)	MPC · JPL
9226 Arimahiroshi	1996 AB_{1}	Arimahiroshi	January 12, 1996	Oizumi	T. Kobayashi	KOR	5.6 km (3.5 mi)	MPC · JPL
9227 Ashida	1996 BO_{2}	Ashida	January 26, 1996	Oizumi	T. Kobayashi	·	10 km (6.2 mi)	MPC · JPL
9228 Nakahiroshi	1996 CG_{1}	Nakahiroshi	February 11, 1996	Oizumi	T. Kobayashi	slow	22 km (14 mi)	MPC · JPL
9229 Matsuda	1996 DJ_{1}	Matsuda	February 20, 1996	Kitami	K. Endate, K. Watanabe	KOR	5.8 km (3.6 mi)	MPC · JPL
9230 Yasuda	1996 YY_{2}	Yasuda	December 29, 1996	Chichibu	N. Satō	THM	9.1 km (5.7 mi)	MPC · JPL
9231 Shimaken	1997 BB_{2}	Shimaken	January 29, 1997	Oizumi	T. Kobayashi	·	3.8 km (2.4 mi)	MPC · JPL
9232 Miretti	1997 BG_{8}	Miretti	January 31, 1997	Pianoro	V. Goretti	·	3.3 km (2.1 mi)	MPC · JPL
9233 Itagijun	1997 CC_{1}	Itagijun	February 1, 1997	Oizumi	T. Kobayashi	slow	6.8 km (4.2 mi)	MPC · JPL
9234 Matsumototaku	1997 CH_{4}	Matsumototaku	February 3, 1997	Oizumi	T. Kobayashi	·	3.3 km (2.1 mi)	MPC · JPL
9235 Shimanamikaido	1997 CT_{21}	Shimanamikaido	February 9, 1997	Kuma Kogen	A. Nakamura	·	2.5 km (1.6 mi)	MPC · JPL
9236 Obermair	1997 EV_{32}	Obermair	March 12, 1997	Linz	E. Meyer	·	3.6 km (2.2 mi)	MPC · JPL
9237	1997 GY_{7}	—	April 2, 1997	Socorro	LINEAR	·	4.6 km (2.9 mi)	MPC · JPL
9238 Yavapai	1997 HO_{2}	Yavapai	April 28, 1997	Prescott	P. G. Comba	KOR	5.9 km (3.7 mi)	MPC · JPL
9239 van Riebeeck	1997 JP_{15}	van Riebeeck	May 3, 1997	La Silla	E. W. Elst	·	3.2 km (2.0 mi)	MPC · JPL
9240 Nassau	1997 KR_{3}	Nassau	May 31, 1997	Kitt Peak	Spacewatch	·	10 km (6.2 mi)	MPC · JPL
9241 Rosfranklin	1997 PE_{6}	Rosfranklin	August 10, 1997	Reedy Creek	J. Broughton	EOS	12 km (7.5 mi)	MPC · JPL
9242 Olea	1998 CS_{3}	Olea	February 6, 1998	La Silla	E. W. Elst	·	2.9 km (1.8 mi)	MPC · JPL
9243 Alag	1998 FF_{68}	Alag	March 20, 1998	Socorro	LINEAR	THM	9.1 km (5.7 mi)	MPC · JPL
9244 Višnjan	1998 HV_{7}	Višnjan	April 21, 1998	Višnjan Observatory	K. Korlević, Radovan, P.	KOR	6.4 km (4.0 mi)	MPC · JPL
9245	1998 HF_{101}	—	April 21, 1998	Socorro	LINEAR	·	4.0 km (2.5 mi)	MPC · JPL
9246 Niemeyer	1998 HB_{149}	Niemeyer	April 25, 1998	La Silla	E. W. Elst	·	4.1 km (2.5 mi)	MPC · JPL
9247	1998 MO_{19}	—	June 23, 1998	Socorro	LINEAR	·	22 km (14 mi)	MPC · JPL
9248 Sauer	4593 P-L	Sauer	September 24, 1960	Palomar	C. J. van Houten, I. van Houten-Groeneveld, T. Gehrels	KOR	5.0 km (3.1 mi)	MPC · JPL
9249 Yen	4606 P-L	Yen	September 24, 1960	Palomar	C. J. van Houten, I. van Houten-Groeneveld, T. Gehrels	·	3.0 km (1.9 mi)	MPC · JPL
9250 Chamberlin	4643 P-L	Chamberlin	September 24, 1960	Palomar	C. J. van Houten, I. van Houten-Groeneveld, T. Gehrels	·	8.8 km (5.5 mi)	MPC · JPL
9251 Harch	4896 P-L	Harch	September 26, 1960	Palomar	C. J. van Houten, I. van Houten-Groeneveld, T. Gehrels	THM	7.1 km (4.4 mi)	MPC · JPL
9252 Goddard	9058 P-L	Goddard	October 17, 1960	Palomar	C. J. van Houten, I. van Houten-Groeneveld, T. Gehrels	·	12 km (7.5 mi)	MPC · JPL
9253 Oberth	1171 T-1	Oberth	March 25, 1971	Palomar	C. J. van Houten, I. van Houten-Groeneveld, T. Gehrels	·	5.5 km (3.4 mi)	MPC · JPL
9254 Shunkai	2151 T-1	Shunkai	March 25, 1971	Palomar	C. J. van Houten, I. van Houten-Groeneveld, T. Gehrels	·	3.5 km (2.2 mi)	MPC · JPL
9255 Inoutadataka	3174 T-1	Inoutadataka	March 26, 1971	Palomar	C. J. van Houten, I. van Houten-Groeneveld, T. Gehrels	·	6.9 km (4.3 mi)	MPC · JPL
9256 Tsukamoto	1324 T-2	Tsukamoto	September 29, 1973	Palomar	C. J. van Houten, I. van Houten-Groeneveld, T. Gehrels	·	6.6 km (4.1 mi)	MPC · JPL
9257 Kunisuke	1552 T-2	Kunisuke	September 24, 1973	Palomar	C. J. van Houten, I. van Houten-Groeneveld, T. Gehrels	EOS	10 km (6.2 mi)	MPC · JPL
9258 Johnpauljones	2137 T-2	Johnpauljones	September 29, 1973	Palomar	C. J. van Houten, I. van Houten-Groeneveld, T. Gehrels	·	1.8 km (1.1 mi)	MPC · JPL
9259 Janvanparadijs	2189 T-2	Janvanparadijs	September 29, 1973	Palomar	C. J. van Houten, I. van Houten-Groeneveld, T. Gehrels	·	3.8 km (2.4 mi)	MPC · JPL
9260 Edwardolson	1953 TA_{1}	Edwardolson	October 8, 1953	Brooklyn	Indiana University	moon	4.1 km (2.5 mi)	MPC · JPL
9261 Peggythomson	1953 TD_{1}	Peggythomson	October 8, 1953	Brooklyn	Indiana University	·	3.7 km (2.3 mi)	MPC · JPL
9262 Bordovitsyna	1973 RF	Bordovitsyna	September 6, 1973	Nauchnij	T. M. Smirnova	MAR	8.1 km (5.0 mi)	MPC · JPL
9263 Khariton	1976 SX_{5}	Khariton	September 24, 1976	Nauchnij	N. S. Chernykh	THM	10 km (6.2 mi)	MPC · JPL
9264	1978 OQ	—	July 28, 1978	Bickley	Perth Observatory	·	9.2 km (5.7 mi)	MPC · JPL
9265 Ekman	1978 RC_{9}	Ekman	September 2, 1978	La Silla	C.-I. Lagerkvist	·	2.3 km (1.4 mi)	MPC · JPL
9266 Holger	1978 RD_{10}	Holger	September 2, 1978	La Silla	C.-I. Lagerkvist	KOR	5.1 km (3.2 mi)	MPC · JPL
9267 Lokrume	1978 RL_{10}	Lokrume	September 2, 1978	La Silla	C.-I. Lagerkvist	KOR	5.2 km (3.2 mi)	MPC · JPL
9268 Jeremihschneider	1978 VZ_{2}	Jeremihschneider	November 7, 1978	Palomar	E. F. Helin, S. J. Bus	·	3.4 km (2.1 mi)	MPC · JPL
9269 Peterolufemi	1978 VW_{6}	Peterolufemi	November 7, 1978	Palomar	E. F. Helin, S. J. Bus	EUN	3.1 km (1.9 mi)	MPC · JPL
9270 Sherryjennings	1978 VO_{8}	Sherryjennings	November 7, 1978	Palomar	E. F. Helin, S. J. Bus	·	10 km (6.2 mi)	MPC · JPL
9271 Trimble	1978 VT_{8}	Trimble	November 7, 1978	Palomar	E. F. Helin, S. J. Bus	·	13 km (8.1 mi)	MPC · JPL
9272 Liseleje	1979 KQ	Liseleje	May 19, 1979	La Silla	R. M. West	·	7.2 km (4.5 mi)	MPC · JPL
9273 Schloerb	1979 QW_{3}	Schloerb	August 22, 1979	La Silla	C.-I. Lagerkvist	·	5.6 km (3.5 mi)	MPC · JPL
9274 Amylovell	1980 FF_{3}	Amylovell	March 16, 1980	La Silla	C.-I. Lagerkvist	·	5.6 km (3.5 mi)	MPC · JPL
9275 Persson	1980 FS_{3}	Persson	March 16, 1980	La Silla	C.-I. Lagerkvist	EOS	6.6 km (4.1 mi)	MPC · JPL
9276 Timgrove	1980 RB_{8}	Timgrove	September 13, 1980	Palomar	S. J. Bus	·	4.4 km (2.7 mi)	MPC · JPL
9277 Togashi	1980 TT_{3}	Togashi	October 9, 1980	Palomar	C. S. Shoemaker, E. M. Shoemaker	V	3.2 km (2.0 mi)	MPC · JPL
9278 Matera	1981 EM_{1}	Matera	March 7, 1981	La Silla	H. Debehogne, G. de Sanctis	THM	12 km (7.5 mi)	MPC · JPL
9279 Seager	1981 EY_{12}	Seager	March 1, 1981	Siding Spring	S. J. Bus	slow	3.8 km (2.4 mi)	MPC · JPL
9280 Stevenjoy	1981 EQ_{14}	Stevenjoy	March 1, 1981	Siding Spring	S. J. Bus	·	4.3 km (2.7 mi)	MPC · JPL
9281 Weryk	1981 EJ_{15}	Weryk	March 1, 1981	Siding Spring	S. J. Bus	NYS	4.5 km (2.8 mi)	MPC · JPL
9282 Lucylim	1981 EP_{16}	Lucylim	March 6, 1981	Siding Spring	S. J. Bus	(254)	2.4 km (1.5 mi)	MPC · JPL
9283 Martinelvis	1981 EY_{17}	Martinelvis	March 2, 1981	Siding Spring	S. J. Bus	·	5.1 km (3.2 mi)	MPC · JPL
9284 Juansanchez	1981 ED_{24}	Juansanchez	March 7, 1981	Siding Spring	S. J. Bus	·	5.4 km (3.4 mi)	MPC · JPL
9285 Le Corre	1981 EL_{24}	Le Corre	March 2, 1981	Siding Spring	S. J. Bus	KOR	6.1 km (3.8 mi)	MPC · JPL
9286 Patricktaylor	1981 ED_{35}	Patricktaylor	March 2, 1981	Siding Spring	S. J. Bus	·	4.0 km (2.5 mi)	MPC · JPL
9287 Klima	1981 ER_{43}	Klima	March 6, 1981	Siding Spring	S. J. Bus	KOR	5.2 km (3.2 mi)	MPC · JPL
9288 Santos-Sanz	1981 EV_{46}	Santos-Sanz	March 2, 1981	Siding Spring	S. J. Bus	·	2.0 km (1.2 mi)	MPC · JPL
9289 Balau	1981 QR_{3}	Balau	August 26, 1981	La Silla	H. Debehogne	EUN	6.3 km (3.9 mi)	MPC · JPL
9290	1981 TT	—	October 6, 1981	Kleť	Z. Vávrová	·	3.0 km (1.9 mi)	MPC · JPL
9291 Alanburdick	1982 QO	Alanburdick	August 17, 1982	Harvard Observatory	Oak Ridge Observatory	EOS	8.0 km (5.0 mi)	MPC · JPL
9292	1982 UE_{2}	—	October 16, 1982	Kleť	A. Mrkos	·	2.3 km (1.4 mi)	MPC · JPL
9293 Kamogata	1982 XQ_{1}	Kamogata	December 13, 1982	Kiso	H. Kosai, K. Furukawa	THM	15 km (9.3 mi)	MPC · JPL
9294	1983 EV	—	March 10, 1983	Anderson Mesa	E. Barr	·	13 km (8.1 mi)	MPC · JPL
9295 Donaldyoung	1983 RT_{1}	Donaldyoung	September 2, 1983	Anderson Mesa	E. Bowell	V	2.9 km (1.8 mi)	MPC · JPL
9296	1983 RB_{2}	—	September 5, 1983	Kleť	Z. Vávrová	PHO	7.8 km (4.8 mi)	MPC · JPL
9297 Marchuk	1984 MP	Marchuk	June 25, 1984	Nauchnij	T. M. Smirnova	EUN	9.4 km (5.8 mi)	MPC · JPL
9298 Geake	1985 JM	Geake	May 15, 1985	Anderson Mesa	E. Bowell	·	14 km (8.7 mi)	MPC · JPL
9299 Vinceteri	1985 JG_{2}	Vinceteri	May 13, 1985	Palomar	C. S. Shoemaker, E. M. Shoemaker	·	6.5 km (4.0 mi)	MPC · JPL
9300 Johannes	1985 PS	Johannes	August 14, 1985	Anderson Mesa	E. Bowell	·	7.3 km (4.5 mi)	MPC · JPL

== 9301–9400 ==
back to top

Designation			Discovery			Properties		Ref
Permanent	Provisional	Named after	Date	Site	Discoverer(s)	Category	Diam.	Ref
9301	1985 RB_{4}	—	September 10, 1985	La Silla	H. Debehogne	·	2.2 km (1.4 mi)	MPC · JPL
9302	1985 TB_{3}	—	October 12, 1985	Zimmerwald	P. Wild	·	3.1 km (1.9 mi)	MPC · JPL
9303	1986 QH_{3}	—	August 29, 1986	La Silla	H. Debehogne	·	4.1 km (2.5 mi)	MPC · JPL
9304	1986 RA_{5}	—	September 1, 1986	La Silla	H. Debehogne	·	4.4 km (2.7 mi)	MPC · JPL
9305 Hazard	1986 TR_{1}	Hazard	October 7, 1986	Anderson Mesa	E. Bowell	·	2.9 km (1.8 mi)	MPC · JPL
9306 Pittosporum	1987 CG	Pittosporum	February 2, 1987	La Silla	E. W. Elst	KOR	7.2 km (4.5 mi)	MPC · JPL
9307 Regiomontanus	1987 QS	Regiomontanus	August 21, 1987	Tautenburg Observatory	F. Börngen	V	2.9 km (1.8 mi)	MPC · JPL
9308 Randyrose	1987 SD_{4}	Randyrose	September 21, 1987	Anderson Mesa	E. Bowell	slow	6.3 km (3.9 mi)	MPC · JPL
9309 Platanus	1987 SS_{9}	Platanus	September 20, 1987	Smolyan	E. W. Elst	THM	8.3 km (5.2 mi)	MPC · JPL
9310	1987 SV_{12}	—	September 18, 1987	La Silla	H. Debehogne	THM	13 km (8.1 mi)	MPC · JPL
9311	1987 UV_{1}	—	October 25, 1987	Kushiro	S. Ueda, H. Kaneda	·	5.6 km (3.5 mi)	MPC · JPL
9312	1987 VE_{2}	—	November 15, 1987	Kushiro	S. Ueda, H. Kaneda	GEF	6.5 km (4.0 mi)	MPC · JPL
9313 Protea	1988 CH_{3}	Protea	February 13, 1988	La Silla	E. W. Elst	·	4.7 km (2.9 mi)	MPC · JPL
9314	1988 DJ_{1}	—	February 19, 1988	Gekko	Y. Oshima	·	7.2 km (4.5 mi)	MPC · JPL
9315 Weigel	1988 PP_{2}	Weigel	August 13, 1988	Tautenburg Observatory	F. Börngen	·	3.9 km (2.4 mi)	MPC · JPL
9316 Rhamnus	1988 PX_{2}	Rhamnus	August 12, 1988	Haute-Provence	E. W. Elst	EOS	10 km (6.2 mi)	MPC · JPL
9317	1988 RO_{4}	—	September 1, 1988	La Silla	H. Debehogne	EOS	8.0 km (5.0 mi)	MPC · JPL
9318	1988 RG_{9}	—	September 6, 1988	La Silla	H. Debehogne	·	2.5 km (1.6 mi)	MPC · JPL
9319 Hartzell	1988 RV_{11}	Hartzell	September 14, 1988	Cerro Tololo	S. J. Bus	·	5.5 km (3.4 mi)	MPC · JPL
9320	1988 VN_{3}	—	November 11, 1988	Gekko	Y. Oshima	(2076)	2.5 km (1.6 mi)	MPC · JPL
9321 Alexkonopliv	1989 AK	Alexkonopliv	January 5, 1989	Chiyoda	T. Kojima	·	10 km (6.2 mi)	MPC · JPL
9322 Lindenau	1989 AC_{7}	Lindenau	January 10, 1989	Tautenburg Observatory	F. Börngen	THM	9.5 km (5.9 mi)	MPC · JPL
9323 Hirohisasato	1989 CV_{1}	Hirohisasato	February 11, 1989	Geisei	T. Seki	slow	6.8 km (4.2 mi)	MPC · JPL
9324	1989 CH_{4}	—	February 7, 1989	Kushiro	S. Ueda, H. Kaneda	·	6.4 km (4.0 mi)	MPC · JPL
9325 Stonehenge	1989 GG_{4}	Stonehenge	April 3, 1989	La Silla	E. W. Elst	V	3.9 km (2.4 mi)	MPC · JPL
9326 Ruta	1989 SP_{2}	Ruta	September 26, 1989	La Silla	E. W. Elst	HOF	10 km (6.2 mi)	MPC · JPL
9327 Duerbeck	1989 SW_{2}	Duerbeck	September 26, 1989	La Silla	E. W. Elst	·	14 km (8.7 mi)	MPC · JPL
9328	1990 DL_{3}	—	February 24, 1990	La Silla	H. Debehogne	·	7.4 km (4.6 mi)	MPC · JPL
9329 Nikolaimedtner	1990 EO	Nikolaimedtner	March 2, 1990	La Silla	E. W. Elst	V	4.1 km (2.5 mi)	MPC · JPL
9330	1990 EF_{7}	—	March 3, 1990	La Silla	H. Debehogne	THM	12 km (7.5 mi)	MPC · JPL
9331 Fannyhensel	1990 QM_{9}	Fannyhensel	August 16, 1990	La Silla	E. W. Elst	·	3.6 km (2.2 mi)	MPC · JPL
9332	1990 SB_{1}	—	September 16, 1990	Palomar	H. E. Holt	EUN · moon	6.2 km (3.9 mi)	MPC · JPL
9333 Hiraimasa	1990 TK_{3}	Hiraimasa	October 15, 1990	Kitami	K. Endate, K. Watanabe	·	9.7 km (6.0 mi)	MPC · JPL
9334 Moesta	1990 UU_{3}	Moesta	October 16, 1990	La Silla	E. W. Elst	EUN	5.4 km (3.4 mi)	MPC · JPL
9335	1991 AA_{1}	—	January 10, 1991	Yatsugatake	Y. Kushida, O. Muramatsu	slow	6.4 km (4.0 mi)	MPC · JPL
9336 Altenburg	1991 AY_{2}	Altenburg	January 15, 1991	Tautenburg Observatory	F. Börngen	·	2.5 km (1.6 mi)	MPC · JPL
9337	1991 FO_{1}	—	March 17, 1991	La Silla	H. Debehogne	KOR	5.9 km (3.7 mi)	MPC · JPL
9338	1991 FL_{4}	—	March 25, 1991	La Silla	H. Debehogne	·	23 km (14 mi)	MPC · JPL
9339 Kimnovak	1991 GT_{5}	Kimnovak	April 8, 1991	La Silla	E. W. Elst	THM	9.8 km (6.1 mi)	MPC · JPL
9340 Williamholden	1991 LW_{1}	Williamholden	June 6, 1991	La Silla	E. W. Elst	THM · slow	15 km (9.3 mi)	MPC · JPL
9341 Gracekelly	1991 PH_{2}	Gracekelly	August 2, 1991	La Silla	E. W. Elst	·	4.0 km (2.5 mi)	MPC · JPL
9342 Carygrant	1991 PJ_{7}	Carygrant	August 6, 1991	La Silla	E. W. Elst	·	2.8 km (1.7 mi)	MPC · JPL
9343	1991 PO_{11}	—	August 9, 1991	Palomar	H. E. Holt	V	4.0 km (2.5 mi)	MPC · JPL
9344 Klopstock	1991 RB_{4}	Klopstock	September 12, 1991	Tautenburg Observatory	F. Börngen, L. D. Schmadel	·	17 km (11 mi)	MPC · JPL
9345	1991 RA_{10}	—	September 12, 1991	Palomar	H. E. Holt	·	3.2 km (2.0 mi)	MPC · JPL
9346 Fernandel	1991 RN_{11}	Fernandel	September 4, 1991	La Silla	E. W. Elst	NYS	4.7 km (2.9 mi)	MPC · JPL
9347	1991 RY_{21}	—	September 15, 1991	Palomar	H. E. Holt	NYS	5.2 km (3.2 mi)	MPC · JPL
9348	1991 RH_{25}	—	September 11, 1991	Palomar	H. E. Holt	·	4.0 km (2.5 mi)	MPC · JPL
9349 Lucas	1991 SX	Lucas	September 30, 1991	Siding Spring	R. H. McNaught	(2076)	2.2 km (1.4 mi)	MPC · JPL
9350 Waseda	1991 TH_{2}	Waseda	October 13, 1991	Nyukasa	M. Hirasawa, S. Suzuki	NYS	5.1 km (3.2 mi)	MPC · JPL
9351 Neumayer	1991 TH_{6}	Neumayer	October 2, 1991	Tautenburg Observatory	L. D. Schmadel, F. Börngen	·	3.4 km (2.1 mi)	MPC · JPL
9352	1991 UB_{4}	—	October 31, 1991	Kushiro	S. Ueda, H. Kaneda	·	11 km (6.8 mi)	MPC · JPL
9353	1991 VM_{4}	—	November 9, 1991	Dynic	A. Sugie	NYS	5.5 km (3.4 mi)	MPC · JPL
9354	1991 VF_{7}	—	November 11, 1991	Kushiro	S. Ueda, H. Kaneda	·	7.6 km (4.7 mi)	MPC · JPL
9355	1991 XO_{2}	—	December 5, 1991	Kushiro	S. Ueda, H. Kaneda	ERI	6.4 km (4.0 mi)	MPC · JPL
9356 Elineke	1991 YV	Elineke	December 30, 1991	Haute-Provence	E. W. Elst	EUN	8.0 km (5.0 mi)	MPC · JPL
9357 Venezuela	1992 AT_{3}	Venezuela	January 11, 1992	Mérida	Naranjo, O. A.	KOR	6.8 km (4.2 mi)	MPC · JPL
9358 Fårö	1992 DN_{7}	Fårö	February 29, 1992	La Silla	UESAC	·	5.7 km (3.5 mi)	MPC · JPL
9359 Fleringe	1992 ED_{11}	Fleringe	March 6, 1992	La Silla	UESAC	·	9.1 km (5.7 mi)	MPC · JPL
9360	1992 EV_{13}	—	March 2, 1992	La Silla	UESAC	·	4.5 km (2.8 mi)	MPC · JPL
9361	1992 EM_{18}	—	March 3, 1992	La Silla	UESAC	·	3.5 km (2.2 mi)	MPC · JPL
9362 Miyajima	1992 FE_{1}	Miyajima	March 23, 1992	Kitami	K. Endate, K. Watanabe	fast?	8.8 km (5.5 mi)	MPC · JPL
9363	1992 GR	—	April 3, 1992	Kushiro	S. Ueda, H. Kaneda	EUN	5.4 km (3.4 mi)	MPC · JPL
9364 Clusius	1992 HZ_{3}	Clusius	April 23, 1992	La Silla	E. W. Elst	·	12 km (7.5 mi)	MPC · JPL
9365 Chinesewilson	1992 RU_{3}	Chinesewilson	September 2, 1992	La Silla	E. W. Elst	·	3.5 km (2.2 mi)	MPC · JPL
9366	1992 WR_{1}	—	November 17, 1992	Dynic	A. Sugie	·	3.2 km (2.0 mi)	MPC · JPL
9367	1993 BO_{3}	—	January 30, 1993	Yakiimo	Natori, A., T. Urata	·	3.0 km (1.9 mi)	MPC · JPL
9368 Esashi	1993 BS_{3}	Esashi	January 26, 1993	Kagoshima	M. Mukai, Takeishi, M.	·	4.3 km (2.7 mi)	MPC · JPL
9369	1993 DB_{1}	—	February 20, 1993	Okutama	Hioki, T., Hayakawa, S.	·	4.6 km (2.9 mi)	MPC · JPL
9370	1993 FC_{22}	—	March 21, 1993	La Silla	UESAC	·	4.9 km (3.0 mi)	MPC · JPL
9371	1993 FV_{31}	—	March 19, 1993	La Silla	UESAC	·	6.1 km (3.8 mi)	MPC · JPL
9372 Vamlingbo	1993 FK_{37}	Vamlingbo	March 19, 1993	La Silla	UESAC	KOR	5.1 km (3.2 mi)	MPC · JPL
9373 Hamra	1993 FY_{43}	Hamra	March 19, 1993	La Silla	UESAC	·	3.3 km (2.1 mi)	MPC · JPL
9374 Sundre	1993 FJ_{46}	Sundre	March 19, 1993	La Silla	UESAC	·	2.4 km (1.5 mi)	MPC · JPL
9375 Omodaka	1993 HK	Omodaka	April 16, 1993	Kitami	K. Endate, K. Watanabe	NYS	6.4 km (4.0 mi)	MPC · JPL
9376 Thionville	1993 OU_{7}	Thionville	July 20, 1993	La Silla	E. W. Elst	·	5.5 km (3.4 mi)	MPC · JPL
9377 Metz	1993 PJ_{7}	Metz	August 15, 1993	Caussols	E. W. Elst	·	8.9 km (5.5 mi)	MPC · JPL
9378 Nancy-Lorraine	1993 QF_{3}	Nancy-Lorraine	August 18, 1993	Caussols	E. W. Elst	THM	12 km (7.5 mi)	MPC · JPL
9379 Dijon	1993 QH_{3}	Dijon	August 18, 1993	Caussols	E. W. Elst	KOR	6.0 km (3.7 mi)	MPC · JPL
9380 Mâcon	1993 QZ_{5}	Mâcon	August 17, 1993	Caussols	E. W. Elst	KOR	5.7 km (3.5 mi)	MPC · JPL
9381 Lyon	1993 RT_{19}	Lyon	September 15, 1993	La Silla	H. Debehogne, E. W. Elst	·	7.2 km (4.5 mi)	MPC · JPL
9382 Mihonoseki	1993 TK_{11}	Mihonoseki	October 11, 1993	Kitami	K. Endate, K. Watanabe	·	3.2 km (2.0 mi)	MPC · JPL
9383 Montélimar	1993 TP_{15}	Montélimar	October 9, 1993	La Silla	E. W. Elst	·	7.4 km (4.6 mi)	MPC · JPL
9384 Aransio	1993 TP_{26}	Aransio	October 9, 1993	La Silla	E. W. Elst	THM	14 km (8.7 mi)	MPC · JPL
9385 Avignon	1993 TJ_{30}	Avignon	October 9, 1993	La Silla	E. W. Elst	·	13 km (8.1 mi)	MPC · JPL
9386 Hitomi	1993 XD_{1}	Hitomi	December 5, 1993	Nyukasa	M. Hirasawa, S. Suzuki	·	10 km (6.2 mi)	MPC · JPL
9387 Tweedledee	1994 CA	Tweedledee	February 2, 1994	Fujieda	Shiozawa, H., T. Urata	H	4.6 km (2.9 mi)	MPC · JPL
9388 Takeno	1994 EH_{2}	Takeno	March 10, 1994	Oizumi	T. Kobayashi	·	4.1 km (2.5 mi)	MPC · JPL
9389 Condillac	1994 ET_{6}	Condillac	March 9, 1994	Caussols	E. W. Elst	·	2.7 km (1.7 mi)	MPC · JPL
9390	1994 NJ_{1}	—	July 12, 1994	Nachi-Katsuura	Y. Shimizu, T. Urata	NYS	2.7 km (1.7 mi)	MPC · JPL
9391 Slee	1994 PH_{1}	Slee	August 14, 1994	Siding Spring	R. H. McNaught	·	7.3 km (4.5 mi)	MPC · JPL
9392 Cavaillon	1994 PK_{7}	Cavaillon	August 10, 1994	La Silla	E. W. Elst	V	3.0 km (1.9 mi)	MPC · JPL
9393 Apta	1994 PT_{14}	Apta	August 10, 1994	La Silla	E. W. Elst	·	4.8 km (3.0 mi)	MPC · JPL
9394 Manosque	1994 PV_{16}	Manosque	August 10, 1994	La Silla	E. W. Elst	·	6.3 km (3.9 mi)	MPC · JPL
9395 Saint Michel	1994 PC_{39}	Saint Michel	August 10, 1994	La Silla	E. W. Elst	·	4.8 km (3.0 mi)	MPC · JPL
9396 Yamaneakisato	1994 QT	Yamaneakisato	August 17, 1994	Oizumi	T. Kobayashi	·	11 km (6.8 mi)	MPC · JPL
9397 Lombardi	1994 RJ	Lombardi	September 6, 1994	Stroncone	Santa Lucia	·	1.9 km (1.2 mi)	MPC · JPL
9398 Bidelman	1994 SH_{3}	Bidelman	September 28, 1994	Kitt Peak	Spacewatch	CYB	8.8 km (5.5 mi)	MPC · JPL
9399 Pesch	1994 ST_{12}	Pesch	September 29, 1994	Kitt Peak	Spacewatch	(5)	4.4 km (2.7 mi)	MPC · JPL
9400	1994 TW_{1}	—	October 9, 1994	Palomar	E. F. Helin, K. J. Lawrence	T_{j} (2.94) · AMO +1 km (0.62 mi)	3.7 km (2.3 mi)	MPC · JPL

== 9401–9500 ==
back to top

Designation			Discovery			Properties		Ref
Permanent	Provisional	Named after	Date	Site	Discoverer(s)	Category	Diam.	Ref
9401	1994 TS_{3}	—	October 13, 1994	Nachi-Katsuura	Y. Shimizu, T. Urata	EUN	5.8 km (3.6 mi)	MPC · JPL
9402	1994 UN_{1}	—	October 25, 1994	Kushiro	S. Ueda, H. Kaneda	CYB	20 km (12 mi)	MPC · JPL
9403 Sanduleak	1994 UJ_{11}	Sanduleak	October 31, 1994	Kitt Peak	Spacewatch	·	7.1 km (4.4 mi)	MPC · JPL
9404	1994 UQ_{11}	—	October 26, 1994	Kushiro	S. Ueda, H. Kaneda	·	5.7 km (3.5 mi)	MPC · JPL
9405 Johnratje	1994 WQ_{1}	Johnratje	November 27, 1994	Oizumi	T. Kobayashi	KOR	6.1 km (3.8 mi)	MPC · JPL
9406	1994 WG_{2}	—	November 28, 1994	Kushiro	S. Ueda, H. Kaneda	slow	12 km (7.5 mi)	MPC · JPL
9407 Kimuranaoto	1994 WS_{3}	Kimuranaoto	November 28, 1994	Kiyosato	S. Otomo	·	6.8 km (4.2 mi)	MPC · JPL
9408 Haseakira	1995 BC	Haseakira	January 20, 1995	Oizumi	T. Kobayashi	KOR	5.6 km (3.5 mi)	MPC · JPL
9409 Kanpuzan	1995 BG_{1}	Kanpuzan	January 25, 1995	Geisei	T. Seki	·	13 km (8.1 mi)	MPC · JPL
9410	1995 BJ_{1}	—	January 26, 1995	Oohira	T. Urata	THM	17 km (11 mi)	MPC · JPL
9411 Hitomiyamoto	1995 CF	Hitomiyamoto	February 1, 1995	Oizumi	T. Kobayashi	HYG	11 km (6.8 mi)	MPC · JPL
9412	1995 GZ_{8}	—	April 4, 1995	Kushiro	S. Ueda, H. Kaneda	·	4.9 km (3.0 mi)	MPC · JPL
9413 Eichendorff	1995 SQ_{54}	Eichendorff	September 21, 1995	Tautenburg Observatory	F. Börngen	·	5.8 km (3.6 mi)	MPC · JPL
9414 Masamimurakami	1995 UV_{4}	Masamimurakami	October 25, 1995	Oizumi	T. Kobayashi	PHO	12 km (7.5 mi)	MPC · JPL
9415 Yujiokimura	1995 VE	Yujiokimura	November 1, 1995	Oizumi	T. Kobayashi	·	2.4 km (1.5 mi)	MPC · JPL
9416 Miyahara	1995 WS	Miyahara	November 17, 1995	Oizumi	T. Kobayashi	·	2.5 km (1.6 mi)	MPC · JPL
9417 Jujiishii	1995 WU	Jujiishii	November 17, 1995	Oizumi	T. Kobayashi	·	8.5 km (5.3 mi)	MPC · JPL
9418 Mayumi	1995 WX_{5}	Mayumi	November 18, 1995	Chichibu	N. Satō, T. Urata	·	3.3 km (2.1 mi)	MPC · JPL
9419 Keikochaki	1995 XS	Keikochaki	December 12, 1995	Oizumi	T. Kobayashi	·	3.4 km (2.1 mi)	MPC · JPL
9420 Dewar	1995 XP_{4}	Dewar	December 14, 1995	Kitt Peak	Spacewatch	(2076)	3.2 km (2.0 mi)	MPC · JPL
9421 Violilla	1995 YM_{2}	Violilla	December 24, 1995	Church Stretton	S. P. Laurie	·	3.9 km (2.4 mi)	MPC · JPL
9422 Kuboniwa	1996 AO_{2}	Kuboniwa	January 13, 1996	Oizumi	T. Kobayashi	·	4.6 km (2.9 mi)	MPC · JPL
9423 Abt	1996 AT_{7}	Abt	January 12, 1996	Kitt Peak	Spacewatch	·	13 km (8.1 mi)	MPC · JPL
9424 Hiroshinishiyama	1996 BN	Hiroshinishiyama	January 16, 1996	Oizumi	T. Kobayashi	MAS	3.3 km (2.1 mi)	MPC · JPL
9425 Marconcini	1996 CM_{7}	Marconcini	February 14, 1996	Asiago	M. Tombelli, U. Munari	·	4.1 km (2.5 mi)	MPC · JPL
9426 Aliante	1996 CO_{7}	Aliante	February 14, 1996	Cima Ekar	U. Munari, M. Tombelli	KOR	6.3 km (3.9 mi)	MPC · JPL
9427 Righini	1996 CV_{7}	Righini	February 14, 1996	Cima Ekar	M. Tombelli, U. Munari	EOS	8.4 km (5.2 mi)	MPC · JPL
9428 Angelalouise	1996 DW_{2}	Angelalouise	February 26, 1996	Church Stretton	S. P. Laurie	·	14 km (8.7 mi)	MPC · JPL
9429 Poreč	1996 EW_{1}	Poreč	March 14, 1996	Višnjan Observatory	Višnjan	·	8.1 km (5.0 mi)	MPC · JPL
9430 Erichthonios	1996 HU_{10}	Erichthonios	April 17, 1996	La Silla	E. W. Elst	L5	28 km (17 mi)	MPC · JPL
9431 Pytho	1996 PS_{1}	Pytho	August 12, 1996	Farra d'Isonzo	Farra d'Isonzo	L4	38 km (24 mi)	MPC · JPL
9432 Iba	1997 CQ	Iba	February 1, 1997	Oizumi	T. Kobayashi	·	4.6 km (2.9 mi)	MPC · JPL
9433	1997 CF_{3}	—	February 3, 1997	Haleakalā	NEAT	·	5.4 km (3.4 mi)	MPC · JPL
9434 Bokusen	1997 CJ_{20}	Bokusen	February 12, 1997	Oizumi	T. Kobayashi	·	2.5 km (1.6 mi)	MPC · JPL
9435 Odafukashi	1997 CK_{20}	Odafukashi	February 12, 1997	Oizumi	T. Kobayashi	·	3.3 km (2.1 mi)	MPC · JPL
9436 Shudo	1997 EB	Shudo	March 1, 1997	Oizumi	T. Kobayashi	NYS	5.0 km (3.1 mi)	MPC · JPL
9437 Hironari	1997 EA_{3}	Hironari	March 4, 1997	Oizumi	T. Kobayashi	·	4.0 km (2.5 mi)	MPC · JPL
9438 Satie	1997 EE_{16}	Satie	March 5, 1997	Kitt Peak	Spacewatch	·	2.5 km (1.6 mi)	MPC · JPL
9439	1997 EB_{42}	—	March 10, 1997	Socorro	LINEAR	·	3.9 km (2.4 mi)	MPC · JPL
9440	1997 FZ_{1}	—	March 29, 1997	Xinglong	SCAP	·	5.0 km (3.1 mi)	MPC · JPL
9441	1997 GN_{8}	—	April 2, 1997	Socorro	LINEAR	HYG	8.7 km (5.4 mi)	MPC · JPL
9442 Beiligong	1997 GQ_{27}	Beiligong	April 2, 1997	Xinglong	SCAP	EUN	6.7 km (4.2 mi)	MPC · JPL
9443	1997 HR_{9}	—	April 30, 1997	Socorro	LINEAR	·	3.9 km (2.4 mi)	MPC · JPL
9444	1997 JA	—	May 1, 1997	Kleť	Kleť	·	14 km (8.7 mi)	MPC · JPL
9445 Charpentier	1997 JA_{8}	Charpentier	May 8, 1997	Prescott	P. G. Comba	·	2.7 km (1.7 mi)	MPC · JPL
9446 Cicero	1997 JT_{11}	Cicero	May 3, 1997	La Silla	E. W. Elst	THM	13 km (8.1 mi)	MPC · JPL
9447 Julesbordet	1997 JJ_{18}	Julesbordet	May 3, 1997	La Silla	E. W. Elst	GEF	5.9 km (3.7 mi)	MPC · JPL
9448 Donaldavies	1997 LJ_{3}	Donaldavies	June 5, 1997	Kitt Peak	Spacewatch	·	4.0 km (2.5 mi)	MPC · JPL
9449 Petrbondy	1997 VU_{2}	Petrbondy	November 4, 1997	Ondřejov	L. Kotková	EOS	11 km (6.8 mi)	MPC · JPL
9450 Akikoizumo	1998 BT_{1}	Akikoizumo	January 19, 1998	Oizumi	T. Kobayashi	·	3.4 km (2.1 mi)	MPC · JPL
9451	1998 BE_{2}	—	January 20, 1998	Socorro	LINEAR	THM	13 km (8.1 mi)	MPC · JPL
9452 Rogerpeeters	1998 DY_{33}	Rogerpeeters	February 27, 1998	La Silla	E. W. Elst	·	6.6 km (4.1 mi)	MPC · JPL
9453 Mallorca	1998 FO_{1}	Mallorca	March 19, 1998	Majorca	Á. López J., R. Pacheco	EOS	8.0 km (5.0 mi)	MPC · JPL
9454 Ardeishar	1998 FX_{54}	Ardeishar	March 20, 1998	Socorro	LINEAR	·	6.7 km (4.2 mi)	MPC · JPL
9455	1998 FJ_{56}	—	March 20, 1998	Socorro	LINEAR	·	10 km (6.2 mi)	MPC · JPL
9456	1998 FQ_{67}	—	March 20, 1998	Socorro	LINEAR	·	6.4 km (4.0 mi)	MPC · JPL
9457	1998 FB_{75}	—	March 24, 1998	Socorro	LINEAR	THM	12 km (7.5 mi)	MPC · JPL
9458 Beaumont	1998 FF_{97}	Beaumont	March 31, 1998	Socorro	LINEAR	·	4.0 km (2.5 mi)	MPC · JPL
9459 Gracecai	1998 FW_{113}	Gracecai	March 31, 1998	Socorro	LINEAR	·	5.5 km (3.4 mi)	MPC · JPL
9460 McGlynn	1998 HS_{30}	McGlynn	April 29, 1998	Haleakalā	NEAT	EUN ·	8.1 km (5.0 mi)	MPC · JPL
9461 Cotingkeh	1998 HV_{33}	Cotingkeh	April 20, 1998	Socorro	LINEAR	·	4.5 km (2.8 mi)	MPC · JPL
9462	1998 HC_{37}	—	April 20, 1998	Socorro	LINEAR	NYS	3.6 km (2.2 mi)	MPC · JPL
9463 Criscione	1998 HW_{38}	Criscione	April 20, 1998	Socorro	LINEAR	KOR	5.0 km (3.1 mi)	MPC · JPL
9464	1998 HL_{117}	—	April 23, 1998	Socorro	LINEAR	·	16 km (9.9 mi)	MPC · JPL
9465 Fergusonsam	1998 HJ_{121}	Fergusonsam	April 23, 1998	Socorro	LINEAR	EOS	6.9 km (4.3 mi)	MPC · JPL
9466 Shishir	1998 KR_{46}	Shishir	May 22, 1998	Socorro	LINEAR	(2076)	3.6 km (2.2 mi)	MPC · JPL
9467	1998 KQ_{47}	—	May 22, 1998	Socorro	LINEAR	·	10 km (6.2 mi)	MPC · JPL
9468 Brewer	1998 LT_{2}	Brewer	June 1, 1998	La Silla	E. W. Elst	·	6.1 km (3.8 mi)	MPC · JPL
9469 Shashank	1998 MY_{34}	Shashank	June 24, 1998	Socorro	LINEAR	·	3.1 km (1.9 mi)	MPC · JPL
9470 Jussieu	1998 OS_{10}	Jussieu	July 26, 1998	La Silla	E. W. Elst	THM	12 km (7.5 mi)	MPC · JPL
9471 Ostend	1998 OU_{13}	Ostend	July 26, 1998	La Silla	E. W. Elst	AGN	5.7 km (3.5 mi)	MPC · JPL
9472 Bruges	1998 OD_{14}	Bruges	July 26, 1998	La Silla	E. W. Elst	·	8.1 km (5.0 mi)	MPC · JPL
9473 Ghent	1998 OO_{14}	Ghent	July 26, 1998	La Silla	E. W. Elst	·	3.4 km (2.1 mi)	MPC · JPL
9474 Cassadrury	1998 QK_{15}	Cassadrury	August 17, 1998	Socorro	LINEAR	(2076) · moon	3.6 km (2.2 mi)	MPC · JPL
9475	1998 QC_{19}	—	August 17, 1998	Socorro	LINEAR	·	9.2 km (5.7 mi)	MPC · JPL
9476 Vincenthuang	1998 QQ_{36}	Vincenthuang	August 17, 1998	Socorro	LINEAR	SUL	8.6 km (5.3 mi)	MPC · JPL
9477 Kefennell	1998 QK_{41}	Kefennell	August 17, 1998	Socorro	LINEAR	·	2.4 km (1.5 mi)	MPC · JPL
9478 Caldeyro	2148 P-L	Caldeyro	September 24, 1960	Palomar	C. J. van Houten, I. van Houten-Groeneveld, T. Gehrels	HYG	7.6 km (4.7 mi)	MPC · JPL
9479 Madresplazamayo	2175 P-L	Madresplazamayo	September 26, 1960	Palomar	C. J. van Houten, I. van Houten-Groeneveld, T. Gehrels	·	2.7 km (1.7 mi)	MPC · JPL
9480 Inti	2553 P-L	Inti	September 24, 1960	Palomar	C. J. van Houten, I. van Houten-Groeneveld, T. Gehrels	THM	13 km (8.1 mi)	MPC · JPL
9481 Menchú	2559 P-L	Menchú	September 24, 1960	Palomar	C. J. van Houten, I. van Houten-Groeneveld, T. Gehrels	·	4.7 km (2.9 mi)	MPC · JPL
9482 Rubéndarío	4065 P-L	Rubéndarío	September 24, 1960	Palomar	C. J. van Houten, I. van Houten-Groeneveld, T. Gehrels	·	2.0 km (1.2 mi)	MPC · JPL
9483 Chagas	4121 P-L	Chagas	September 24, 1960	Palomar	C. J. van Houten, I. van Houten-Groeneveld, T. Gehrels	·	10 km (6.2 mi)	MPC · JPL
9484 Wanambi	4590 P-L	Wanambi	September 24, 1960	Palomar	C. J. van Houten, I. van Houten-Groeneveld, T. Gehrels	THM	9.4 km (5.8 mi)	MPC · JPL
9485 Uluru	6108 P-L	Uluru	September 24, 1960	Palomar	C. J. van Houten, I. van Houten-Groeneveld, T. Gehrels	·	4.3 km (2.7 mi)	MPC · JPL
9486 Utemorrah	6130 P-L	Utemorrah	September 24, 1960	Palomar	C. J. van Houten, I. van Houten-Groeneveld, T. Gehrels	·	5.1 km (3.2 mi)	MPC · JPL
9487 Kupe	7633 P-L	Kupe	October 17, 1960	Palomar	C. J. van Houten, I. van Houten-Groeneveld, T. Gehrels	KOR	5.2 km (3.2 mi)	MPC · JPL
9488 Huia	9523 P-L	Huia	September 24, 1960	Palomar	C. J. van Houten, I. van Houten-Groeneveld, T. Gehrels	slow	3.6 km (2.2 mi)	MPC · JPL
9489 Tanemahuta	1146 T-1	Tanemahuta	March 25, 1971	Palomar	C. J. van Houten, I. van Houten-Groeneveld, T. Gehrels	·	3.4 km (2.1 mi)	MPC · JPL
9490 Gosemeijer	1181 T-1	Gosemeijer	March 25, 1971	Palomar	C. J. van Houten, I. van Houten-Groeneveld, T. Gehrels	·	7.6 km (4.7 mi)	MPC · JPL
9491 Thooft	1205 T-1	Thooft	March 25, 1971	Palomar	C. J. van Houten, I. van Houten-Groeneveld, T. Gehrels	·	2.2 km (1.4 mi)	MPC · JPL
9492 Veltman	2066 T-1	Veltman	March 25, 1971	Palomar	C. J. van Houten, I. van Houten-Groeneveld, T. Gehrels	·	2.8 km (1.7 mi)	MPC · JPL
9493 Enescu	3100 T-1	Enescu	March 26, 1971	Palomar	C. J. van Houten, I. van Houten-Groeneveld, T. Gehrels	·	6.5 km (4.0 mi)	MPC · JPL
9494 Donici	3212 T-1	Donici	March 26, 1971	Palomar	C. J. van Houten, I. van Houten-Groeneveld, T. Gehrels	·	3.8 km (2.4 mi)	MPC · JPL
9495 Eminescu	4177 T-1	Eminescu	March 26, 1971	Palomar	C. J. van Houten, I. van Houten-Groeneveld, T. Gehrels	·	3.3 km (2.1 mi)	MPC · JPL
9496 Ockels	4260 T-1	Ockels	March 26, 1971	Palomar	C. J. van Houten, I. van Houten-Groeneveld, T. Gehrels	KOR	5.5 km (3.4 mi)	MPC · JPL
9497 Dwingeloo	1001 T-2	Dwingeloo	September 29, 1973	Palomar	C. J. van Houten, I. van Houten-Groeneveld, T. Gehrels	·	5.5 km (3.4 mi)	MPC · JPL
9498 Westerbork	1197 T-2	Westerbork	September 29, 1973	Palomar	C. J. van Houten, I. van Houten-Groeneveld, T. Gehrels	NYS	2.5 km (1.6 mi)	MPC · JPL
9499 Excalibur	1269 T-2	Excalibur	September 29, 1973	Palomar	C. J. van Houten, I. van Houten-Groeneveld, T. Gehrels	KOR	5.1 km (3.2 mi)	MPC · JPL
9500 Camelot	1281 T-2	Camelot	September 29, 1973	Palomar	C. J. van Houten, I. van Houten-Groeneveld, T. Gehrels	EUN	3.7 km (2.3 mi)	MPC · JPL

== 9501–9600 ==
back to top

Designation			Discovery			Properties		Ref
Permanent	Provisional	Named after	Date	Site	Discoverer(s)	Category	Diam.	Ref
9501 Ywain	2071 T-2	Ywain	September 29, 1973	Palomar	C. J. van Houten, I. van Houten-Groeneveld, T. Gehrels	·	5.8 km (3.6 mi)	MPC · JPL
9502 Gaimar	2075 T-2	Gaimar	September 29, 1973	Palomar	C. J. van Houten, I. van Houten-Groeneveld, T. Gehrels	·	3.5 km (2.2 mi)	MPC · JPL
9503 Agrawain	2180 T-2	Agrawain	September 29, 1973	Palomar	C. J. van Houten, I. van Houten-Groeneveld, T. Gehrels	·	14 km (8.7 mi)	MPC · JPL
9504 Lionel	2224 T-2	Lionel	September 29, 1973	Palomar	C. J. van Houten, I. van Houten-Groeneveld, T. Gehrels	·	4.8 km (3.0 mi)	MPC · JPL
9505 Lohengrin	4131 T-2	Lohengrin	September 29, 1973	Palomar	C. J. van Houten, I. van Houten-Groeneveld, T. Gehrels	·	8.6 km (5.3 mi)	MPC · JPL
9506 Telramund	5200 T-2	Telramund	September 25, 1973	Palomar	C. J. van Houten, I. van Houten-Groeneveld, T. Gehrels	TEL	6.5 km (4.0 mi)	MPC · JPL
9507 Gottfried	5447 T-2	Gottfried	September 30, 1973	Palomar	C. J. van Houten, I. van Houten-Groeneveld, T. Gehrels	·	3.1 km (1.9 mi)	MPC · JPL
9508 Titurel	3395 T-3	Titurel	October 16, 1977	Palomar	C. J. van Houten, I. van Houten-Groeneveld, T. Gehrels	·	4.1 km (2.5 mi)	MPC · JPL
9509 Amfortas	3453 T-3	Amfortas	October 16, 1977	Palomar	C. J. van Houten, I. van Houten-Groeneveld, T. Gehrels	·	3.7 km (2.3 mi)	MPC · JPL
9510 Gurnemanz	5022 T-3	Gurnemanz	October 16, 1977	Palomar	C. J. van Houten, I. van Houten-Groeneveld, T. Gehrels	EOS	6.4 km (4.0 mi)	MPC · JPL
9511 Klingsor	5051 T-3	Klingsor	October 16, 1977	Palomar	C. J. van Houten, I. van Houten-Groeneveld, T. Gehrels	GEF	6.4 km (4.0 mi)	MPC · JPL
9512 Feijunlong	1966 CM	Feijunlong	February 13, 1966	Nanking	Purple Mountain	EUN	7.0 km (4.3 mi)	MPC · JPL
9513	1971 UN	—	October 26, 1971	Hamburg-Bergedorf	L. Kohoutek	·	10 km (6.2 mi)	MPC · JPL
9514 Deineka	1973 SG_{5}	Deineka	September 27, 1973	Nauchnij	L. V. Zhuravleva	·	4.1 km (2.5 mi)	MPC · JPL
9515 Dubner	1975 RA_{2}	Dubner	September 5, 1975	El Leoncito	Cesco, M. R.	PHO	12 km (7.5 mi)	MPC · JPL
9516 Inasan	1976 YL_{3}	Inasan	December 16, 1976	Nauchnij	L. I. Chernykh	·	11 km (6.8 mi)	MPC · JPL
9517 Niehaisheng	1977 VL_{1}	Niehaisheng	November 3, 1977	Nanking	Purple Mountain	·	7.2 km (4.5 mi)	MPC · JPL
9518 Robbynaish	1978 GA	Robbynaish	April 7, 1978	Harvard Observatory	Harvard Observatory	·	4.5 km (2.8 mi)	MPC · JPL
9519 Jeffkeck	1978 VK_{3}	Jeffkeck	November 6, 1978	Palomar	E. F. Helin, S. J. Bus	·	5.0 km (3.1 mi)	MPC · JPL
9520 Montydibiasi	1978 VV_{6}	Montydibiasi	November 7, 1978	Palomar	E. F. Helin, S. J. Bus	·	2.5 km (1.6 mi)	MPC · JPL
9521 Martinhoffmann	1980 FS_{1}	Martinhoffmann	March 16, 1980	La Silla	C.-I. Lagerkvist	·	2.9 km (1.8 mi)	MPC · JPL
9522 Schlichting	1981 DS	Schlichting	February 28, 1981	Siding Spring	S. J. Bus	CYB	17 km (11 mi)	MPC · JPL
9523 Torino	1981 EE_{1}	Torino	March 5, 1981	PLS	H. Debehogne, G. de Sanctis	NYS	5.2 km (3.2 mi)	MPC · JPL
9524 O'Rourke	1981 EJ_{5}	O'Rourke	March 2, 1981	Siding Spring	S. J. Bus	·	2.9 km (1.8 mi)	MPC · JPL
9525 Amandasickafoose	1981 EF_{11}	Amandasickafoose	March 1, 1981	Siding Spring	S. J. Bus	·	5.2 km (3.2 mi)	MPC · JPL
9526 Billmckinnon	1981 EC_{13}	Billmckinnon	March 1, 1981	Siding Spring	S. J. Bus	·	6.0 km (3.7 mi)	MPC · JPL
9527 Sherrypervan	1981 EH_{23}	Sherrypervan	March 3, 1981	Siding Spring	S. J. Bus	·	4.8 km (3.0 mi)	MPC · JPL
9528 Küppers	1981 EH_{24}	Küppers	March 7, 1981	Siding Spring	S. J. Bus	KOR	3.5 km (2.2 mi)	MPC · JPL
9529 Protopapa	1981 EF_{25}	Protopapa	March 2, 1981	Siding Spring	S. J. Bus	·	3.3 km (2.1 mi)	MPC · JPL
9530 Kelleymichael	1981 EO_{26}	Kelleymichael	March 2, 1981	Siding Spring	S. J. Bus	KOR	4.8 km (3.0 mi)	MPC · JPL
9531 Jean-Luc	1981 QK	Jean-Luc	August 30, 1981	Anderson Mesa	E. Bowell	·	4.2 km (2.6 mi)	MPC · JPL
9532 Abramenko	1981 RQ_{2}	Abramenko	September 7, 1981	Nauchnij	L. G. Karachkina	·	6.3 km (3.9 mi)	MPC · JPL
9533 Aleksejleonov	1981 SA_{7}	Aleksejleonov	September 28, 1981	Nauchnij	L. V. Zhuravleva	(5)	9.6 km (6.0 mi)	MPC · JPL
9534	1981 TP	—	October 4, 1981	Anderson Mesa	N. G. Thomas	THM	10 km (6.2 mi)	MPC · JPL
9535 Plitchenko	1981 UO_{11}	Plitchenko	October 22, 1981	Nauchnij	N. S. Chernykh	·	4.3 km (2.7 mi)	MPC · JPL
9536 Statler	1981 UR_{27}	Statler	October 24, 1981	Palomar	S. J. Bus	EUN	9.9 km (6.2 mi)	MPC · JPL
9537 Nolan	1982 BM	Nolan	January 18, 1982	Anderson Mesa	E. Bowell	·	11 km (6.8 mi)	MPC · JPL
9538	1982 UM_{2}	—	October 20, 1982	Kleť	A. Mrkos	·	4.5 km (2.8 mi)	MPC · JPL
9539 Prishvin	1982 UE_{7}	Prishvin	October 21, 1982	Nauchnij	L. G. Karachkina	THM	9.6 km (6.0 mi)	MPC · JPL
9540 Mikhalkov	1982 UJ_{7}	Mikhalkov	October 21, 1982	Nauchnij	L. G. Karachkina	THM	13 km (8.1 mi)	MPC · JPL
9541 Magri	1983 CH	Magri	February 11, 1983	Anderson Mesa	E. Bowell	·	4.4 km (2.7 mi)	MPC · JPL
9542 Eryan	1983 TU_{1}	Eryan	October 12, 1983	Anderson Mesa	E. Bowell	·	8.2 km (5.1 mi)	MPC · JPL
9543 Nitra	1983 XN_{1}	Nitra	December 4, 1983	Piszkéstető	M. Antal	EOS	9.9 km (6.2 mi)	MPC · JPL
9544 Scottbirney	1984 EL	Scottbirney	March 1, 1984	Anderson Mesa	E. Bowell	HYG	15 km (9.3 mi)	MPC · JPL
9545 Petrovedomosti	1984 MQ	Petrovedomosti	June 25, 1984	Nauchnij	T. M. Smirnova	·	9.5 km (5.9 mi)	MPC · JPL
9546	1984 SD_{6}	—	September 22, 1984	La Silla	H. Debehogne	·	3.9 km (2.4 mi)	MPC · JPL
9547	1985 AE	—	January 15, 1985	Toyota	K. Suzuki, T. Urata	·	7.9 km (4.9 mi)	MPC · JPL
9548 Fortran	1985 CN	Fortran	February 13, 1985	Kitt Peak	Spacewatch	·	5.4 km (3.4 mi)	MPC · JPL
9549 Akplatonov	1985 SM_{2}	Akplatonov	September 19, 1985	Nauchnij	N. S. Chernykh, L. I. Chernykh	EUN	8.2 km (5.1 mi)	MPC · JPL
9550 Victorblanco	1985 TY_{1}	Victorblanco	October 15, 1985	Anderson Mesa	E. Bowell	·	13 km (8.1 mi)	MPC · JPL
9551 Kazi	1985 UJ	Kazi	October 20, 1985	Kleť	A. Mrkos	·	4.3 km (2.7 mi)	MPC · JPL
9552	1985 UY	—	October 24, 1985	Kleť	A. Mrkos	CYB · slow ·	17 km (11 mi)	MPC · JPL
9553 Colas	1985 UG_{2}	Colas	October 17, 1985	Caussols	CERGA	·	3.8 km (2.4 mi)	MPC · JPL
9554 Dumont	1985 XA	Dumont	December 13, 1985	Caussols	Chemin, R.	H	2.9 km (1.8 mi)	MPC · JPL
9555 Frejakocha	1986 GC	Frejakocha	April 2, 1986	Brorfelde	Copenhagen Observatory	V	3.0 km (1.9 mi)	MPC · JPL
9556 Gaywray	1986 GF	Gaywray	April 8, 1986	Palomar	INAS	PHO · slow	6.0 km (3.7 mi)	MPC · JPL
9557	1986 QL_{2}	—	August 28, 1986	La Silla	H. Debehogne	·	12 km (7.5 mi)	MPC · JPL
9558	1986 QB_{3}	—	August 29, 1986	La Silla	H. Debehogne	THM	12 km (7.5 mi)	MPC · JPL
9559	1987 DH_{6}	—	February 23, 1987	La Silla	H. Debehogne	slow	14 km (8.7 mi)	MPC · JPL
9560 Anguita	1987 EQ	Anguita	March 3, 1987	Anderson Mesa	E. Bowell	·	3.8 km (2.4 mi)	MPC · JPL
9561 van Eyck	1987 QT_{1}	van Eyck	August 19, 1987	La Silla	E. W. Elst	·	4.2 km (2.6 mi)	MPC · JPL
9562 Memling	1987 RG	Memling	September 1, 1987	La Silla	E. W. Elst	THM	18 km (11 mi)	MPC · JPL
9563 Kitty	1987 SJ_{1}	Kitty	September 21, 1987	Anderson Mesa	E. Bowell	NYS	3.3 km (2.1 mi)	MPC · JPL
9564 Jeffwynn	1987 SG_{3}	Jeffwynn	September 26, 1987	Palomar	C. S. Shoemaker, E. M. Shoemaker	·	6.1 km (3.8 mi)	MPC · JPL
9565 Tikhonov	1987 SU_{17}	Tikhonov	September 18, 1987	Nauchnij	L. I. Chernykh	V	4.5 km (2.8 mi)	MPC · JPL
9566 Rykhlova	1987 SX_{17}	Rykhlova	September 18, 1987	Nauchnij	L. I. Chernykh	ERI	9.3 km (5.8 mi)	MPC · JPL
9567 Surgut	1987 US_{4}	Surgut	October 22, 1987	Nauchnij	L. V. Zhuravleva	·	6.0 km (3.7 mi)	MPC · JPL
9568	1988 AX_{4}	—	January 13, 1988	La Silla	H. Debehogne	V	3.4 km (2.1 mi)	MPC · JPL
9569 Quintenmatsijs	1988 CL_{2}	Quintenmatsijs	February 11, 1988	La Silla	E. W. Elst	·	6.1 km (3.8 mi)	MPC · JPL
9570	1988 RQ_{5}	—	September 2, 1988	La Silla	H. Debehogne	·	8.1 km (5.0 mi)	MPC · JPL
9571	1988 RR_{5}	—	September 2, 1988	La Silla	H. Debehogne	·	3.0 km (1.9 mi)	MPC · JPL
9572	1988 RS_{6}	—	September 8, 1988	La Silla	H. Debehogne	·	1.9 km (1.2 mi)	MPC · JPL
9573 Matsumotomas	1988 UC	Matsumotomas	October 16, 1988	Kitami	K. Endate, K. Watanabe	KOR	6.8 km (4.2 mi)	MPC · JPL
9574 Taku	1988 XB_{5}	Taku	December 5, 1988	Kiso	Nakamura, T.	·	4.3 km (2.7 mi)	MPC · JPL
9575	1989 BW_{1}	—	January 29, 1989	Kleť	A. Mrkos	·	3.1 km (1.9 mi)	MPC · JPL
9576 van der Weyden	1989 CX_{2}	van der Weyden	February 4, 1989	La Silla	E. W. Elst	EOS	8.6 km (5.3 mi)	MPC · JPL
9577 Gropius	1989 CE_{5}	Gropius	February 2, 1989	Tautenburg Observatory	F. Börngen	NYS	3.8 km (2.4 mi)	MPC · JPL
9578 Klyazma	1989 GA_{3}	Klyazma	April 3, 1989	La Silla	E. W. Elst	NYS	5.3 km (3.3 mi)	MPC · JPL
9579 Passchendaele	1989 GO_{4}	Passchendaele	April 3, 1989	La Silla	E. W. Elst	NYS	8.7 km (5.4 mi)	MPC · JPL
9580 Tarumi	1989 TB_{11}	Tarumi	October 4, 1989	Minami-Oda	T. Nomura, K. Kawanishi	·	5.8 km (3.6 mi)	MPC · JPL
9581	1990 DM_{3}	—	February 24, 1990	La Silla	H. Debehogne	·	3.6 km (2.2 mi)	MPC · JPL
9582	1990 EL_{7}	—	March 3, 1990	La Silla	H. Debehogne	·	4.4 km (2.7 mi)	MPC · JPL
9583 Clerke	1990 HL_{1}	Clerke	April 28, 1990	Siding Spring	R. H. McNaught	·	5.1 km (3.2 mi)	MPC · JPL
9584 Louchheim	1990 OL_{4}	Louchheim	July 25, 1990	Palomar	H. E. Holt	slow	6.0 km (3.7 mi)	MPC · JPL
9585	1990 QY_{2}	—	August 28, 1990	Palomar	H. E. Holt	·	6.7 km (4.2 mi)	MPC · JPL
9586	1990 SG_{11}	—	September 16, 1990	Palomar	H. E. Holt	·	4.7 km (2.9 mi)	MPC · JPL
9587 Bonpland	1990 UG_{4}	Bonpland	October 16, 1990	La Silla	E. W. Elst	EUN	4.8 km (3.0 mi)	MPC · JPL
9588 Quesnay	1990 WE_{2}	Quesnay	November 18, 1990	La Silla	E. W. Elst	·	4.6 km (2.9 mi)	MPC · JPL
9589 Deridder	1990 WU_{5}	Deridder	November 21, 1990	La Silla	E. W. Elst	(5)	3.3 km (2.1 mi)	MPC · JPL
9590 Hyria	1991 DK_{1}	Hyria	February 21, 1991	Kitt Peak	Spacewatch	L4	20 km (12 mi)	MPC · JPL
9591	1991 FH_{2}	—	March 20, 1991	La Silla	H. Debehogne	·	6.4 km (4.0 mi)	MPC · JPL
9592 Clairaut	1991 GK_{4}	Clairaut	April 8, 1991	La Silla	E. W. Elst	KOR	6.5 km (4.0 mi)	MPC · JPL
9593	1991 PZ_{17}	—	August 7, 1991	Palomar	H. E. Holt	·	3.4 km (2.1 mi)	MPC · JPL
9594 Garstang	1991 RG	Garstang	September 4, 1991	Siding Spring	R. H. McNaught	·	4.1 km (2.5 mi)	MPC · JPL
9595	1991 RE_{11}	—	September 13, 1991	Palomar	H. E. Holt	·	4.4 km (2.7 mi)	MPC · JPL
9596	1991 RC_{22}	—	September 15, 1991	Palomar	H. E. Holt	·	3.0 km (1.9 mi)	MPC · JPL
9597	1991 UF	—	October 18, 1991	Kushiro	S. Ueda, H. Kaneda	·	3.8 km (2.4 mi)	MPC · JPL
9598	1991 UQ	—	October 18, 1991	Kushiro	S. Ueda, H. Kaneda	·	3.3 km (2.1 mi)	MPC · JPL
9599 Onotomoko	1991 UP_{2}	Onotomoko	October 29, 1991	Kitami	K. Endate, K. Watanabe	·	4.3 km (2.7 mi)	MPC · JPL
9600	1991 UB_{3}	—	October 31, 1991	Kushiro	S. Ueda, H. Kaneda	·	2.8 km (1.7 mi)	MPC · JPL

== 9601–9700 ==
back to top

Designation			Discovery			Properties		Ref
Permanent	Provisional	Named after	Date	Site	Discoverer(s)	Category	Diam.	Ref
9601	1991 UE_{3}	—	October 18, 1991	Kushiro	S. Ueda, H. Kaneda	·	4.7 km (2.9 mi)	MPC · JPL
9602 Oya	1991 UU_{3}	Oya	October 31, 1991	Kitami	T. Fujii, K. Watanabe	·	5.4 km (3.4 mi)	MPC · JPL
9603	1991 VG_{2}	—	November 9, 1991	Kushiro	S. Ueda, H. Kaneda	NYS	4.3 km (2.7 mi)	MPC · JPL
9604 Bellevanzuylen	1991 YW	Bellevanzuylen	December 30, 1991	Haute-Provence	E. W. Elst	·	5.3 km (3.3 mi)	MPC · JPL
9605 A Coruña	1992 AP_{3}	A Coruña	January 11, 1992	Mérida	Naranjo, O. A.	·	4.8 km (3.0 mi)	MPC · JPL
9606	1992 BZ	—	January 28, 1992	Kushiro	S. Ueda, H. Kaneda	·	5.3 km (3.3 mi)	MPC · JPL
9607	1992 DS_{6}	—	February 29, 1992	La Silla	UESAC	CLO	9.2 km (5.7 mi)	MPC · JPL
9608	1992 PD_{2}	—	August 2, 1992	Palomar	H. E. Holt	·	10 km (6.2 mi)	MPC · JPL
9609 Ponomarevalya	1992 QL_{2}	Ponomarevalya	August 26, 1992	Nauchnij	L. I. Chernykh	EOS	12 km (7.5 mi)	MPC · JPL
9610 Vischer	1992 RQ	Vischer	September 2, 1992	Tautenburg Observatory	F. Börngen, L. D. Schmadel	·	11 km (6.8 mi)	MPC · JPL
9611 Anouck	1992 RF_{7}	Anouck	September 2, 1992	La Silla	E. W. Elst	·	10 km (6.2 mi)	MPC · JPL
9612 Belgorod	1992 RT_{7}	Belgorod	September 4, 1992	Nauchnij	L. V. Zhuravleva	·	7.6 km (4.7 mi)	MPC · JPL
9613	1993 BN_{3}	—	January 26, 1993	Kitt Peak	T. J. Balonek	V	2.3 km (1.4 mi)	MPC · JPL
9614 Cuvier	1993 BQ_{4}	Cuvier	January 27, 1993	Caussols	E. W. Elst	·	3.2 km (2.0 mi)	MPC · JPL
9615 Hemerijckx	1993 BX_{13}	Hemerijckx	January 23, 1993	La Silla	E. W. Elst	·	3.9 km (2.4 mi)	MPC · JPL
9616	1993 FR_{3}	—	March 21, 1993	Palomar	E. F. Helin	V	2.8 km (1.7 mi)	MPC · JPL
9617 Grahamchapman	1993 FA_{5}	Grahamchapman	March 17, 1993	La Silla	UESAC	moon	2.8 km (1.7 mi)	MPC · JPL
9618 Johncleese	1993 FQ_{8}	Johncleese	March 17, 1993	La Silla	UESAC	·	2.0 km (1.2 mi)	MPC · JPL
9619 Terrygilliam	1993 FS_{9}	Terrygilliam	March 17, 1993	La Silla	UESAC	ERI	6.6 km (4.1 mi)	MPC · JPL
9620 Ericidle	1993 FU_{13}	Ericidle	March 17, 1993	La Silla	UESAC	·	3.5 km (2.2 mi)	MPC · JPL
9621 Michaelpalin	1993 FT_{26}	Michaelpalin	March 21, 1993	La Silla	UESAC	·	3.6 km (2.2 mi)	MPC · JPL
9622 Terryjones	1993 FV_{26}	Terryjones	March 21, 1993	La Silla	UESAC	·	3.2 km (2.0 mi)	MPC · JPL
9623 Karlsson	1993 FU_{28}	Karlsson	March 21, 1993	La Silla	UESAC	·	5.4 km (3.4 mi)	MPC · JPL
9624	1993 FH_{38}	—	March 19, 1993	La Silla	UESAC	NYS	6.1 km (3.8 mi)	MPC · JPL
9625	1993 HF	—	April 16, 1993	Kushiro	S. Ueda, H. Kaneda	·	6.5 km (4.0 mi)	MPC · JPL
9626 Stanley	1993 JF_{1}	Stanley	May 14, 1993	La Silla	E. W. Elst	NYS	3.6 km (2.2 mi)	MPC · JPL
9627	1993 LU_{1}	—	June 15, 1993	Palomar	H. E. Holt	EUN	5.4 km (3.4 mi)	MPC · JPL
9628 Sendaiotsuna	1993 OB_{2}	Sendaiotsuna	July 16, 1993	Palomar	E. F. Helin	EUN	8.4 km (5.2 mi)	MPC · JPL
9629 Servet	1993 PU_{7}	Servet	August 15, 1993	Caussols	E. W. Elst	·	9.1 km (5.7 mi)	MPC · JPL
9630 Castellion	1993 PW_{7}	Castellion	August 15, 1993	Caussols	E. W. Elst	·	6.8 km (4.2 mi)	MPC · JPL
9631 Hubertreeves	1993 SL_{6}	Hubertreeves	September 17, 1993	La Silla	E. W. Elst	KOR	6.2 km (3.9 mi)	MPC · JPL
9632 Sudo	1993 TK_{3}	Sudo	October 15, 1993	Kitami	K. Endate, K. Watanabe	·	7.0 km (4.3 mi)	MPC · JPL
9633 Cotur	1993 UP_{8}	Cotur	October 20, 1993	La Silla	E. W. Elst	EOS	10 km (6.2 mi)	MPC · JPL
9634 Vodice	1993 XB	Vodice	December 4, 1993	Farra d'Isonzo	Farra d'Isonzo	·	6.1 km (3.8 mi)	MPC · JPL
9635	1993 XS	—	December 9, 1993	Oohira	T. Urata	·	7.2 km (4.5 mi)	MPC · JPL
9636 Emanuelaspessot	1993 YO	Emanuelaspessot	December 17, 1993	Farra d'Isonzo	Farra d'Isonzo	·	10 km (6.2 mi)	MPC · JPL
9637 Perryrose	1994 PJ_{2}	Perryrose	August 9, 1994	Palomar	Palomar	·	3.3 km (2.1 mi)	MPC · JPL
9638 Fuchs	1994 PO_{7}	Fuchs	August 10, 1994	La Silla	E. W. Elst	·	4.8 km (3.0 mi)	MPC · JPL
9639 Scherer	1994 PS_{11}	Scherer	August 10, 1994	La Silla	E. W. Elst	·	7.4 km (4.6 mi)	MPC · JPL
9640 Lippens	1994 PP_{26}	Lippens	August 12, 1994	La Silla	E. W. Elst	NYS	5.3 km (3.3 mi)	MPC · JPL
9641 Demazière	1994 PB_{30}	Demazière	August 12, 1994	La Silla	E. W. Elst	·	4.6 km (2.9 mi)	MPC · JPL
9642 Takatahiro	1994 RU	Takatahiro	September 1, 1994	Kitami	K. Endate, K. Watanabe	NYS	4.9 km (3.0 mi)	MPC · JPL
9643	1994 RX	—	September 2, 1994	Nachi-Katsuura	Y. Shimizu, T. Urata	·	6.8 km (4.2 mi)	MPC · JPL
9644	1994 WQ_{3}	—	November 26, 1994	Nachi-Katsuura	Y. Shimizu, T. Urata	·	8.0 km (5.0 mi)	MPC · JPL
9645 Grünewald	1995 AO_{4}	Grünewald	January 5, 1995	Tautenburg Observatory	F. Börngen	·	10 km (6.2 mi)	MPC · JPL
9646	1995 BV	—	January 25, 1995	Oizumi	T. Kobayashi	THM · fast	10 km (6.2 mi)	MPC · JPL
9647	1995 UM_{8}	—	October 27, 1995	Oizumi	T. Kobayashi	·	2.3 km (1.4 mi)	MPC · JPL
9648 Gotouhideo	1995 UB_{9}	Gotouhideo	October 30, 1995	Kashihara	F. Uto	·	3.7 km (2.3 mi)	MPC · JPL
9649 Junfukue	1995 XG	Junfukue	December 2, 1995	Oizumi	T. Kobayashi	·	3.0 km (1.9 mi)	MPC · JPL
9650 Okadaira	1995 YG	Okadaira	December 17, 1995	Oizumi	T. Kobayashi	·	3.7 km (2.3 mi)	MPC · JPL
9651 Arii-SooHoo	1996 AJ	Arii-SooHoo	January 7, 1996	Haleakalā	AMOS	NYS	4.6 km (2.9 mi)	MPC · JPL
9652	1996 AF_{2}	—	January 12, 1996	Kushiro	S. Ueda, H. Kaneda	·	8.7 km (5.4 mi)	MPC · JPL
9653	1996 AL_{2}	—	January 13, 1996	Oohira	T. Urata	EUN	6.0 km (3.7 mi)	MPC · JPL
9654 Seitennokai	1996 AQ_{2}	Seitennokai	January 13, 1996	Oizumi	T. Kobayashi	·	2.4 km (1.5 mi)	MPC · JPL
9655 Yaburanger	1996 CH_{1}	Yaburanger	February 11, 1996	Oizumi	T. Kobayashi	·	3.4 km (2.1 mi)	MPC · JPL
9656 Kurokawahiroki	1996 DK_{1}	Kurokawahiroki	February 23, 1996	Oizumi	T. Kobayashi	·	7.9 km (4.9 mi)	MPC · JPL
9657 Učka	1996 DG_{2}	Učka	February 24, 1996	Višnjan Observatory	K. Korlević, Matković, D.	·	14 km (8.7 mi)	MPC · JPL
9658 Imabari	1996 DD_{3}	Imabari	February 28, 1996	Kuma Kogen	A. Nakamura	·	3.8 km (2.4 mi)	MPC · JPL
9659	1996 EJ	—	March 10, 1996	Kushiro	S. Ueda, H. Kaneda	EUN	8.9 km (5.5 mi)	MPC · JPL
9660 Brucewillis	1996 FW_{4}	Brucewillis	March 22, 1996	Haleakalā	NEAT	THM	14 km (8.7 mi)	MPC · JPL
9661 Hohmann	1996 FU_{13}	Hohmann	March 18, 1996	Kitt Peak	Spacewatch	T_{j} (2.97) · 3:2	28 km (17 mi)	MPC · JPL
9662 Frankhubbard	1996 GS	Frankhubbard	April 12, 1996	Prescott	P. G. Comba	GEF	4.9 km (3.0 mi)	MPC · JPL
9663 Zwin	1996 GC_{18}	Zwin	April 15, 1996	La Silla	E. W. Elst	·	3.7 km (2.3 mi)	MPC · JPL
9664 Brueghel	1996 HT_{14}	Brueghel	April 17, 1996	La Silla	E. W. Elst	THM · fast	12 km (7.5 mi)	MPC · JPL
9665 Inastronoviny	1996 LA	Inastronoviny	June 5, 1996	Kleť	Kleť	·	9.5 km (5.9 mi)	MPC · JPL
9666	1997 GM_{22}	—	April 6, 1997	Socorro	LINEAR	EUN	6.6 km (4.1 mi)	MPC · JPL
9667 Amastrinc	1997 HC_{16}	Amastrinc	April 29, 1997	Kitt Peak	Spacewatch	NYS	7.4 km (4.6 mi)	MPC · JPL
9668 Tianyahaijiao	1997 LN	Tianyahaijiao	June 3, 1997	Xinglong	SCAP	·	4.3 km (2.7 mi)	MPC · JPL
9669 Symmetria	1997 NC_{3}	Symmetria	July 8, 1997	Prescott	P. G. Comba	THM	11 km (6.8 mi)	MPC · JPL
9670 Magni	1997 NJ_{10}	Magni	July 10, 1997	Campo Imperatore	A. Boattini	EOS	13 km (8.1 mi)	MPC · JPL
9671 Hemera	1997 TU_{9}	Hemera	October 5, 1997	Ondřejov	L. Kotková	·	7.3 km (4.5 mi)	MPC · JPL
9672 Rosenbergerezek	1997 TA_{10}	Rosenbergerezek	October 5, 1997	Ondřejov	P. Pravec	·	14 km (8.7 mi)	MPC · JPL
9673 Kunishimakoto	1997 UC_{25}	Kunishimakoto	October 25, 1997	Kiyosato	S. Otomo	·	3.5 km (2.2 mi)	MPC · JPL
9674 Slovenija	1998 QU_{15}	Slovenija	August 23, 1998	Črni Vrh	Črni Vrh	·	4.5 km (2.8 mi)	MPC · JPL
9675	1998 QK_{36}	—	August 17, 1998	Socorro	LINEAR	·	13 km (8.1 mi)	MPC · JPL
9676 Eijkman	2023 P-L	Eijkman	September 24, 1960	Palomar	C. J. van Houten, I. van Houten-Groeneveld, T. Gehrels	THM	10 km (6.2 mi)	MPC · JPL
9677 Gowlandhopkins	2532 P-L	Gowlandhopkins	September 24, 1960	Palomar	C. J. van Houten, I. van Houten-Groeneveld, T. Gehrels	·	8.6 km (5.3 mi)	MPC · JPL
9678 van der Meer	2584 P-L	van der Meer	September 24, 1960	Palomar	C. J. van Houten, I. van Houten-Groeneveld, T. Gehrels	·	2.5 km (1.6 mi)	MPC · JPL
9679 Crutzen	2600 P-L	Crutzen	September 24, 1960	Palomar	C. J. van Houten, I. van Houten-Groeneveld, T. Gehrels	·	2.6 km (1.6 mi)	MPC · JPL
9680 Molina	3557 P-L	Molina	October 22, 1960	Palomar	C. J. van Houten, I. van Houten-Groeneveld, T. Gehrels	·	4.4 km (2.7 mi)	MPC · JPL
9681 Sherwoodrowland	4069 P-L	Sherwoodrowland	September 24, 1960	Palomar	C. J. van Houten, I. van Houten-Groeneveld, T. Gehrels	EOS · fast	7.3 km (4.5 mi)	MPC · JPL
9682 Gravesande	4073 P-L	Gravesande	September 24, 1960	Palomar	C. J. van Houten, I. van Houten-Groeneveld, T. Gehrels	·	2.5 km (1.6 mi)	MPC · JPL
9683 Rambaldo	4099 P-L	Rambaldo	September 24, 1960	Palomar	C. J. van Houten, I. van Houten-Groeneveld, T. Gehrels	·	2.9 km (1.8 mi)	MPC · JPL
9684 Olieslagers	4113 P-L	Olieslagers	September 24, 1960	Palomar	C. J. van Houten, I. van Houten-Groeneveld, T. Gehrels	NYS	5.7 km (3.5 mi)	MPC · JPL
9685 Korteweg	4247 P-L	Korteweg	September 24, 1960	Palomar	C. J. van Houten, I. van Houten-Groeneveld, T. Gehrels	NYS	5.2 km (3.2 mi)	MPC · JPL
9686 Keesom	4604 P-L	Keesom	September 24, 1960	Palomar	C. J. van Houten, I. van Houten-Groeneveld, T. Gehrels	·	2.3 km (1.4 mi)	MPC · JPL
9687 Uhlenbeck	4614 P-L	Uhlenbeck	September 24, 1960	Palomar	C. J. van Houten, I. van Houten-Groeneveld, T. Gehrels	·	5.4 km (3.4 mi)	MPC · JPL
9688 Goudsmit	4665 P-L	Goudsmit	September 24, 1960	Palomar	C. J. van Houten, I. van Houten-Groeneveld, T. Gehrels	·	7.1 km (4.4 mi)	MPC · JPL
9689 Freudenthal	4831 P-L	Freudenthal	September 24, 1960	Palomar	C. J. van Houten, I. van Houten-Groeneveld, T. Gehrels	·	3.7 km (2.3 mi)	MPC · JPL
9690 Houtgast	6039 P-L	Houtgast	September 24, 1960	Palomar	C. J. van Houten, I. van Houten-Groeneveld, T. Gehrels	·	6.5 km (4.0 mi)	MPC · JPL
9691 Zwaan	6053 P-L	Zwaan	September 24, 1960	Palomar	C. J. van Houten, I. van Houten-Groeneveld, T. Gehrels	·	6.6 km (4.1 mi)	MPC · JPL
9692 Kuperus	6354 P-L	Kuperus	September 24, 1960	Palomar	C. J. van Houten, I. van Houten-Groeneveld, T. Gehrels	·	2.0 km (1.2 mi)	MPC · JPL
9693 Bleeker	6547 P-L	Bleeker	September 24, 1960	Palomar	C. J. van Houten, I. van Houten-Groeneveld, T. Gehrels	NYS	5.6 km (3.5 mi)	MPC · JPL
9694 Lycomedes	6581 P-L	Lycomedes	September 26, 1960	Palomar	C. J. van Houten, I. van Houten-Groeneveld, T. Gehrels	L4	32 km (20 mi)	MPC · JPL
9695 Johnheise	6583 P-L	Johnheise	September 24, 1960	Palomar	C. J. van Houten, I. van Houten-Groeneveld, T. Gehrels	(1338) (FLO)	3.2 km (2.0 mi)	MPC · JPL
9696 Jaffe	6628 P-L	Jaffe	September 24, 1960	Palomar	C. J. van Houten, I. van Houten-Groeneveld, T. Gehrels	MAS	2.1 km (1.3 mi)	MPC · JPL
9697 Louwman	1295 T-1	Louwman	March 25, 1971	Palomar	C. J. van Houten, I. van Houten-Groeneveld, T. Gehrels	·	5.3 km (3.3 mi)	MPC · JPL
9698 Idzerda	2205 T-1	Idzerda	March 25, 1971	Palomar	C. J. van Houten, I. van Houten-Groeneveld, T. Gehrels	V	4.0 km (2.5 mi)	MPC · JPL
9699 Baumhauer	3036 T-1	Baumhauer	March 26, 1971	Palomar	C. J. van Houten, I. van Houten-Groeneveld, T. Gehrels	·	9.2 km (5.7 mi)	MPC · JPL
9700 Paech	3058 T-1	Paech	March 26, 1971	Palomar	C. J. van Houten, I. van Houten-Groeneveld, T. Gehrels	·	2.6 km (1.6 mi)	MPC · JPL

== 9701–9800 ==
back to top

Designation			Discovery			Properties		Ref
Permanent	Provisional	Named after	Date	Site	Discoverer(s)	Category	Diam.	Ref
9701 Mak	1157 T-2	Mak	September 29, 1973	Palomar	C. J. van Houten, I. van Houten-Groeneveld, T. Gehrels	·	5.2 km (3.2 mi)	MPC · JPL
9702 Tomvandijk	2108 T-2	Tomvandijk	September 29, 1973	Palomar	C. J. van Houten, I. van Houten-Groeneveld, T. Gehrels	·	2.7 km (1.7 mi)	MPC · JPL
9703 Sussenbach	3146 T-2	Sussenbach	September 30, 1973	Palomar	C. J. van Houten, I. van Houten-Groeneveld, T. Gehrels	·	2.0 km (1.2 mi)	MPC · JPL
9704 Georgebeekman	5469 T-2	Georgebeekman	September 30, 1973	Palomar	C. J. van Houten, I. van Houten-Groeneveld, T. Gehrels	·	5.7 km (3.5 mi)	MPC · JPL
9705 Drummen	3137 T-3	Drummen	October 16, 1977	Palomar	C. J. van Houten, I. van Houten-Groeneveld, T. Gehrels	EOS	9.3 km (5.8 mi)	MPC · JPL
9706 Bouma	3176 T-3	Bouma	October 16, 1977	Palomar	C. J. van Houten, I. van Houten-Groeneveld, T. Gehrels	·	12 km (7.5 mi)	MPC · JPL
9707 Petruskoning	3226 T-3	Petruskoning	October 16, 1977	Palomar	C. J. van Houten, I. van Houten-Groeneveld, T. Gehrels	fast	9.3 km (5.8 mi)	MPC · JPL
9708 Gouka	4140 T-3	Gouka	October 16, 1977	Palomar	C. J. van Houten, I. van Houten-Groeneveld, T. Gehrels	(5)	4.5 km (2.8 mi)	MPC · JPL
9709 Chrisnell	5192 T-3	Chrisnell	October 16, 1977	Palomar	C. J. van Houten, I. van Houten-Groeneveld, T. Gehrels	EOS	9.7 km (6.0 mi)	MPC · JPL
9710	1964 VN_{1}	—	November 9, 1964	Nanking	Purple Mountain	·	2.6 km (1.6 mi)	MPC · JPL
9711 Želetava	1972 PA	Želetava	August 7, 1972	Zimmerwald	P. Wild, I. Baueršíma	EOS	12 km (7.5 mi)	MPC · JPL
9712 Nauplius	1973 SO_{1}	Nauplius	September 19, 1973	Palomar	C. J. van Houten, I. van Houten-Groeneveld, T. Gehrels	L4	33 km (21 mi)	MPC · JPL
9713 Oeax	1973 SP_{1}	Oeax	September 19, 1973	Palomar	C. J. van Houten, I. van Houten-Groeneveld, T. Gehrels	L4	19 km (12 mi)	MPC · JPL
9714 Piazzismyth	1975 LF_{1}	Piazzismyth	June 1, 1975	Siding Spring	R. H. McNaught	·	22 km (14 mi)	MPC · JPL
9715 Paolotanga	1975 SB_{1}	Paolotanga	September 30, 1975	Palomar	S. J. Bus	VER	11 km (6.8 mi)	MPC · JPL
9716 Severina	1975 UE	Severina	October 27, 1975	Zimmerwald	P. Wild	NYS	5.2 km (3.2 mi)	MPC · JPL
9717 Lyudvasilia	1976 SR_{5}	Lyudvasilia	September 24, 1976	Nauchnij	N. S. Chernykh	·	4.9 km (3.0 mi)	MPC · JPL
9718 Gerbefremov	1976 YR_{1}	Gerbefremov	December 16, 1976	Nauchnij	L. I. Chernykh	·	2.6 km (1.6 mi)	MPC · JPL
9719 Yakage	1977 DF_{2}	Yakage	February 18, 1977	Kiso	H. Kosai, K. Furukawa	·	13 km (8.1 mi)	MPC · JPL
9720 Ulfbirgitta	1980 FH_{1}	Ulfbirgitta	March 16, 1980	La Silla	C.-I. Lagerkvist	·	5.5 km (3.4 mi)	MPC · JPL
9721 Doty	1980 GB	Doty	April 14, 1980	Anderson Mesa	E. Bowell	·	3.9 km (2.4 mi)	MPC · JPL
9722 Levi-Montalcini	1981 EZ	Levi-Montalcini	March 4, 1981	La Silla	H. Debehogne, G. de Sanctis	·	4.6 km (2.9 mi)	MPC · JPL
9723 Binyang	1981 EP_{13}	Binyang	March 1, 1981	Siding Spring	S. J. Bus	·	3.7 km (2.3 mi)	MPC · JPL
9724 Villanueva	1981 EW_{17}	Villanueva	March 2, 1981	Siding Spring	S. J. Bus	NYS	2.7 km (1.7 mi)	MPC · JPL
9725 Wainscoat	1981 EE_{19}	Wainscoat	March 2, 1981	Siding Spring	S. J. Bus	NYS	3.5 km (2.2 mi)	MPC · JPL
9726 Verbiscer	1981 EY_{19}	Verbiscer	March 2, 1981	Siding Spring	S. J. Bus	KOR	4.0 km (2.5 mi)	MPC · JPL
9727 Skrutskie	1981 EW_{24}	Skrutskie	March 2, 1981	Siding Spring	S. J. Bus	KOR	6.4 km (4.0 mi)	MPC · JPL
9728 Videen	1981 EX_{38}	Videen	March 2, 1981	Siding Spring	S. J. Bus	·	5.1 km (3.2 mi)	MPC · JPL
9729	1981 RQ	—	September 7, 1981	Kleť	A. Mrkos	EUN	5.7 km (3.5 mi)	MPC · JPL
9730	1982 FA	—	March 23, 1982	Mount Lemmon	Sitko, M. L., Stein, W. A.	·	4.0 km (2.5 mi)	MPC · JPL
9731	1982 JD_{1}	—	May 15, 1982	Palomar	Palomar	·	4.5 km (2.8 mi)	MPC · JPL
9732 Juchnovski	1984 SJ_{7}	Juchnovski	September 24, 1984	Smolyan	V. G. Shkodrov, V. G. Ivanova	·	4.7 km (2.9 mi)	MPC · JPL
9733 Valtikhonov	1985 SC_{3}	Valtikhonov	September 19, 1985	Nauchnij	N. S. Chernykh, L. I. Chernykh	·	2.2 km (1.4 mi)	MPC · JPL
9734	1986 CB_{2}	—	February 12, 1986	La Silla	H. Debehogne	(2076)	4.0 km (2.5 mi)	MPC · JPL
9735	1986 JD	—	May 2, 1986	Palomar	INAS	·	6.2 km (3.9 mi)	MPC · JPL
9736	1986 QP_{2}	—	August 28, 1986	La Silla	H. Debehogne	THM	9.0 km (5.6 mi)	MPC · JPL
9737 Dudarova	1986 SC_{2}	Dudarova	September 29, 1986	Nauchnij	L. G. Karachkina	·	6.9 km (4.3 mi)	MPC · JPL
9738	1987 DF_{6}	—	February 23, 1987	La Silla	H. Debehogne	EUN	6.5 km (4.0 mi)	MPC · JPL
9739 Powell	1987 SH_{7}	Powell	September 26, 1987	Palomar	C. S. Shoemaker	H · slow	2.7 km (1.7 mi)	MPC · JPL
9740	1987 ST_{11}	—	September 23, 1987	La Silla	H. Debehogne	·	7.7 km (4.8 mi)	MPC · JPL
9741 Solokhin	1987 UU_{4}	Solokhin	October 22, 1987	Nauchnij	L. V. Zhuravleva	·	4.7 km (2.9 mi)	MPC · JPL
9742 Worpswede	1987 WT_{1}	Worpswede	November 26, 1987	Tautenburg Observatory	F. Börngen	·	15 km (9.3 mi)	MPC · JPL
9743 Tohru	1988 GD	Tohru	April 8, 1988	Palomar	E. F. Helin	·	4.7 km (2.9 mi)	MPC · JPL
9744 Nielsen	1988 JW	Nielsen	May 9, 1988	Palomar	C. S. Shoemaker, E. M. Shoemaker	·	4.7 km (2.9 mi)	MPC · JPL
9745 Shinkenwada	1988 VY	Shinkenwada	November 2, 1988	Geisei	T. Seki	KOR	5.3 km (3.3 mi)	MPC · JPL
9746 Kazukoichikawa	1988 VS_{1}	Kazukoichikawa	November 7, 1988	Yatsugatake	Y. Kushida, Inoue, M.	·	4.4 km (2.7 mi)	MPC · JPL
9747	1989 AT	—	January 4, 1989	Kushiro	S. Ueda, H. Kaneda	·	9.2 km (5.7 mi)	MPC · JPL
9748 van Ostaijen	1989 CS_{2}	van Ostaijen	February 4, 1989	La Silla	E. W. Elst	·	3.1 km (1.9 mi)	MPC · JPL
9749 Van den Eijnde	1989 GC_{1}	Van den Eijnde	April 3, 1989	La Silla	E. W. Elst	·	4.5 km (2.8 mi)	MPC · JPL
9750	1989 NE_{1}	—	July 8, 1989	Lake Tekapo	A. C. Gilmore, P. M. Kilmartin	·	4.0 km (2.5 mi)	MPC · JPL
9751 Kadota	1990 QM	Kadota	August 20, 1990	Geisei	T. Seki	NYS	5.9 km (3.7 mi)	MPC · JPL
9752	1990 QZ_{1}	—	August 22, 1990	Palomar	H. E. Holt	·	4.3 km (2.7 mi)	MPC · JPL
9753	1990 QL_{3}	—	August 28, 1990	Palomar	H. E. Holt	V	3.0 km (1.9 mi)	MPC · JPL
9754	1990 QJ_{4}	—	August 23, 1990	Palomar	H. E. Holt	NYS	2.8 km (1.7 mi)	MPC · JPL
9755	1990 RR_{2}	—	September 15, 1990	Palomar	H. E. Holt	·	9.2 km (5.7 mi)	MPC · JPL
9756 Ezaki	1991 CC_{3}	Ezaki	February 12, 1991	Geisei	T. Seki	·	5.8 km (3.6 mi)	MPC · JPL
9757 Felixdejager	1991 GA_{6}	Felixdejager	April 8, 1991	La Silla	E. W. Elst	KOR	6.5 km (4.0 mi)	MPC · JPL
9758 Dainty	1991 GZ_{9}	Dainty	April 13, 1991	Siding Spring	D. I. Steel	CLO	7.7 km (4.8 mi)	MPC · JPL
9759	1991 NE_{7}	—	July 12, 1991	La Silla	H. Debehogne	·	13 km (8.1 mi)	MPC · JPL
9760	1991 PJ_{13}	—	August 5, 1991	Palomar	H. E. Holt	·	2.5 km (1.6 mi)	MPC · JPL
9761 Krautter	1991 RR_{4}	Krautter	September 13, 1991	Tautenburg Observatory	L. D. Schmadel, F. Börngen	·	2.9 km (1.8 mi)	MPC · JPL
9762 Hermannhesse	1991 RA_{5}	Hermannhesse	September 13, 1991	Tautenburg Observatory	F. Börngen, L. D. Schmadel	·	2.3 km (1.4 mi)	MPC · JPL
9763	1991 RU_{17}	—	September 13, 1991	Palomar	H. E. Holt	·	5.1 km (3.2 mi)	MPC · JPL
9764 Morgenstern	1991 UE_{5}	Morgenstern	October 30, 1991	Tautenburg Observatory	F. Börngen	·	3.4 km (2.1 mi)	MPC · JPL
9765	1991 XZ	—	December 14, 1991	Fujieda	Shiozawa, H., M. Kizawa	·	4.3 km (2.7 mi)	MPC · JPL
9766 Bradbury	1992 DZ_{2}	Bradbury	February 24, 1992	Kitt Peak	Spacewatch	·	5.6 km (3.5 mi)	MPC · JPL
9767 Midsomer Norton	1992 EB_{1}	Midsomer Norton	March 10, 1992	Siding Spring	D. I. Steel	T_{j} (2.77) · CYB · 2:1J (unstable)	3.4 km (2.1 mi)	MPC · JPL
9768 Stephenmaran	1992 GB_{1}	Stephenmaran	April 5, 1992	Palomar	C. S. Shoemaker, E. M. Shoemaker	PHO	4.6 km (2.9 mi)	MPC · JPL
9769 Nautilus	1993 DG_{2}	Nautilus	February 24, 1993	Yakiimo	Natori, A., T. Urata	·	2.8 km (1.7 mi)	MPC · JPL
9770 Discovery	1993 EE	Discovery	March 1, 1993	Oohira	T. Urata	·	7.0 km (4.3 mi)	MPC · JPL
9771	1993 FU_{17}	—	March 17, 1993	La Silla	UESAC	·	3.1 km (1.9 mi)	MPC · JPL
9772	1993 MB	—	June 16, 1993	Catalina Station	T. B. Spahr	·	7.5 km (4.7 mi)	MPC · JPL
9773	1993 MG_{1}	—	June 23, 1993	Palomar	E. F. Helin	·	4.0 km (2.5 mi)	MPC · JPL
9774 Annjudge	1993 NO	Annjudge	July 12, 1993	La Silla	E. W. Elst	·	3.5 km (2.2 mi)	MPC · JPL
9775 Joeferguson	1993 OH_{12}	Joeferguson	July 19, 1993	La Silla	E. W. Elst	·	3.8 km (2.4 mi)	MPC · JPL
9776	1993 VL_{3}	—	November 11, 1993	Kushiro	S. Ueda, H. Kaneda	KOR	7.3 km (4.5 mi)	MPC · JPL
9777 Enterprise	1994 OB	Enterprise	July 31, 1994	Nachi-Katsuura	Y. Shimizu, T. Urata	·	5.6 km (3.5 mi)	MPC · JPL
9778 Isabelallende	1994 PA_{19}	Isabelallende	August 12, 1994	La Silla	E. W. Elst	NYS	4.5 km (2.8 mi)	MPC · JPL
9779	1994 RA_{11}	—	September 1, 1994	Kushiro	S. Ueda, H. Kaneda	·	4.5 km (2.8 mi)	MPC · JPL
9780 Bandersnatch	1994 SB	Bandersnatch	September 25, 1994	Nachi-Katsuura	Y. Shimizu, T. Urata	·	5.8 km (3.6 mi)	MPC · JPL
9781 Jubjubbird	1994 UB_{1}	Jubjubbird	October 31, 1994	Nachi-Katsuura	Y. Shimizu, T. Urata	·	5.2 km (3.2 mi)	MPC · JPL
9782 Edo	1994 WM	Edo	November 25, 1994	Oizumi	T. Kobayashi	·	6.0 km (3.7 mi)	MPC · JPL
9783 Tensho-kan	1994 YD_{1}	Tensho-kan	December 28, 1994	Oizumi	T. Kobayashi	moon	5.3 km (3.3 mi)	MPC · JPL
9784 Yotsubashi	1994 YJ_{1}	Yotsubashi	December 31, 1994	Oizumi	T. Kobayashi	PAD	9.9 km (6.2 mi)	MPC · JPL
9785 Senjikan	1994 YX_{1}	Senjikan	December 31, 1994	Oizumi	T. Kobayashi	·	5.0 km (3.1 mi)	MPC · JPL
9786 Gakutensoku	1995 BB	Gakutensoku	January 19, 1995	Oizumi	T. Kobayashi	KOR	5.6 km (3.5 mi)	MPC · JPL
9787	1995 BA_{3}	—	January 27, 1995	Kushiro	S. Ueda, H. Kaneda	·	5.3 km (3.3 mi)	MPC · JPL
9788 Yagami	1995 EQ_{1}	Yagami	March 11, 1995	Oizumi	T. Kobayashi	THM	10 km (6.2 mi)	MPC · JPL
9789	1995 GO_{7}	—	April 4, 1995	Kushiro	S. Ueda, H. Kaneda	THM	17 km (11 mi)	MPC · JPL
9790 Deipyrus	1995 OK_{8}	Deipyrus	July 25, 1995	Kitt Peak	Spacewatch	L4	33 km (21 mi)	MPC · JPL
9791 Kamiyakurai	1995 YD_{1}	Kamiyakurai	December 21, 1995	Oizumi	T. Kobayashi	·	3.8 km (2.4 mi)	MPC · JPL
9792 Nonodakesan	1996 BX_{1}	Nonodakesan	January 23, 1996	Oizumi	T. Kobayashi	·	8.3 km (5.2 mi)	MPC · JPL
9793 Torvalds	1996 BW_{4}	Torvalds	January 16, 1996	Kitt Peak	Spacewatch	·	4.6 km (2.9 mi)	MPC · JPL
9794	1996 FO_{5}	—	March 25, 1996	Xinglong	SCAP	·	4.9 km (3.0 mi)	MPC · JPL
9795 Deprez	1996 GJ_{19}	Deprez	April 15, 1996	La Silla	E. W. Elst	KOR	4.0 km (2.5 mi)	MPC · JPL
9796 Robotti	1996 HW	Robotti	April 19, 1996	Sormano	F. Manca, P. Chiavenna	·	5.8 km (3.6 mi)	MPC · JPL
9797 Raes	1996 HR_{21}	Raes	April 18, 1996	La Silla	E. W. Elst	THM	12 km (7.5 mi)	MPC · JPL
9798	1996 JK	—	May 8, 1996	Kushiro	S. Ueda, H. Kaneda	EOS	13 km (8.1 mi)	MPC · JPL
9799 Thronium	1996 RJ	Thronium	September 8, 1996	Catalina Station	T. B. Spahr	L4 · 006	68 km (42 mi)	MPC · JPL
9800 Shigetoshi	1997 ES_{2}	Shigetoshi	March 4, 1997	Oizumi	T. Kobayashi	NYS	4.2 km (2.6 mi)	MPC · JPL

== 9801–9900 ==
back to top

Designation			Discovery			Properties		Ref
Permanent	Provisional	Named after	Date	Site	Discoverer(s)	Category	Diam.	Ref
9801 Mikewang	1997 FX_{3}	Mikewang	March 31, 1997	Socorro	LINEAR	·	4.7 km (2.9 mi)	MPC · JPL
9802	1997 GQ_{6}	—	April 2, 1997	Socorro	LINEAR	·	4.1 km (2.5 mi)	MPC · JPL
9803	1997 GL_{8}	—	April 2, 1997	Socorro	LINEAR	·	5.7 km (3.5 mi)	MPC · JPL
9804 Shrikulkarni	1997 NU	Shrikulkarni	July 1, 1997	Wise	Ofek, E. O.	EUN	6.1 km (3.8 mi)	MPC · JPL
9805	1997 NZ	—	July 1, 1997	Xinglong	SCAP	EUN	8.7 km (5.4 mi)	MPC · JPL
9806	1997 NR_{6}	—	July 10, 1997	Xinglong	SCAP	EOS	10 km (6.2 mi)	MPC · JPL
9807 Rhene	1997 SJ_{4}	Rhene	September 27, 1997	Oizumi	T. Kobayashi	L4 · slow	25 km (16 mi)	MPC · JPL
9808 Navamijain	1998 QS_{70}	Navamijain	August 24, 1998	Socorro	LINEAR	EUN	4.3 km (2.7 mi)	MPC · JPL
9809 Jimdarwin	1998 RZ_{5}	Jimdarwin	September 13, 1998	Anderson Mesa	LONEOS	·	3.4 km (2.1 mi)	MPC · JPL
9810 Elanfiller	1998 RJ_{65}	Elanfiller	September 14, 1998	Socorro	LINEAR	·	4.1 km (2.5 mi)	MPC · JPL
9811 Cavadore	1998 ST	Cavadore	September 16, 1998	Caussols	ODAS	·	2.0 km (1.2 mi)	MPC · JPL
9812 Danco	1998 SJ_{144}	Danco	September 18, 1998	La Silla	E. W. Elst	slow	4.1 km (2.5 mi)	MPC · JPL
9813 Rozgaj	1998 TP_{5}	Rozgaj	October 13, 1998	Višnjan Observatory	K. Korlević	·	3.8 km (2.4 mi)	MPC · JPL
9814 Ivobenko	1998 UU_{18}	Ivobenko	October 23, 1998	Višnjan Observatory	K. Korlević	·	2.2 km (1.4 mi)	MPC · JPL
9815 Mariakirch	2079 P-L	Mariakirch	September 24, 1960	Palomar	C. J. van Houten, I. van Houten-Groeneveld, T. Gehrels	·	4.5 km (2.8 mi)	MPC · JPL
9816 von Matt	2643 P-L	von Matt	September 24, 1960	Palomar	C. J. van Houten, I. van Houten-Groeneveld, T. Gehrels	HNS	3.9 km (2.4 mi)	MPC · JPL
9817 Thersander	6540 P-L	Thersander	September 24, 1960	Palomar	C. J. van Houten, I. van Houten-Groeneveld, T. Gehrels	L4	23 km (14 mi)	MPC · JPL
9818 Eurymachos	6591 P-L	Eurymachos	September 24, 1960	Palomar	C. J. van Houten, I. van Houten-Groeneveld, T. Gehrels	L4 · ERY	28 km (17 mi)	MPC · JPL
9819 Sangerhausen	2172 T-1	Sangerhausen	March 25, 1971	Palomar	C. J. van Houten, I. van Houten-Groeneveld, T. Gehrels	·	2.7 km (1.7 mi)	MPC · JPL
9820 Hempel	3064 T-1	Hempel	March 26, 1971	Palomar	C. J. van Houten, I. van Houten-Groeneveld, T. Gehrels	fast	2.3 km (1.4 mi)	MPC · JPL
9821 Gitakresáková	4033 T-1	Gitakresáková	March 26, 1971	Palomar	C. J. van Houten, I. van Houten-Groeneveld, T. Gehrels	·	2.7 km (1.7 mi)	MPC · JPL
9822 Hajduková	4114 T-1	Hajduková	March 26, 1971	Palomar	C. J. van Houten, I. van Houten-Groeneveld, T. Gehrels	NYS	3.0 km (1.9 mi)	MPC · JPL
9823 Annantalová	4271 T-1	Annantalová	March 26, 1971	Palomar	C. J. van Houten, I. van Houten-Groeneveld, T. Gehrels	V	2.7 km (1.7 mi)	MPC · JPL
9824 Marylea	3033 T-2	Marylea	September 30, 1973	Palomar	C. J. van Houten, I. van Houten-Groeneveld, T. Gehrels	KOR	5.5 km (3.4 mi)	MPC · JPL
9825 Oetken	1214 T-3	Oetken	October 17, 1977	Palomar	C. J. van Houten, I. van Houten-Groeneveld, T. Gehrels	EOS	9.7 km (6.0 mi)	MPC · JPL
9826 Ehrenfreund	2114 T-3	Ehrenfreund	October 16, 1977	Palomar	C. J. van Houten, I. van Houten-Groeneveld, T. Gehrels	EOS	8.4 km (5.2 mi)	MPC · JPL
9827	1958 TL_{1}	—	October 8, 1958	Flagstaff	Lowell Observatory	·	20 km (12 mi)	MPC · JPL
9828 Antimachos	1973 SS	Antimachos	September 19, 1973	Palomar	C. J. van Houten, I. van Houten-Groeneveld, T. Gehrels	L4	20 km (12 mi)	MPC · JPL
9829 Murillo	1973 SJ_{1}	Murillo	September 19, 1973	Palomar	C. J. van Houten, I. van Houten-Groeneveld, T. Gehrels	3:2 · SHU	26 km (16 mi)	MPC · JPL
9830 Franciswasiak	1978 VE_{11}	Franciswasiak	November 7, 1978	Palomar	E. F. Helin, S. J. Bus	·	2.5 km (1.6 mi)	MPC · JPL
9831 Simongreen	1979 QZ	Simongreen	August 22, 1979	La Silla	C.-I. Lagerkvist	NYS	3.7 km (2.3 mi)	MPC · JPL
9832 Xiaobinwang	1981 EH_{3}	Xiaobinwang	March 2, 1981	Siding Spring	S. J. Bus	·	2.2 km (1.4 mi)	MPC · JPL
9833 Rilke	1982 DW_{3}	Rilke	February 21, 1982	Tautenburg Observatory	F. Börngen	·	3.2 km (2.0 mi)	MPC · JPL
9834 Kirsanov	1982 TS_{1}	Kirsanov	October 14, 1982	Nauchnij	L. G. Karachkina	EOS	12 km (7.5 mi)	MPC · JPL
9835	1984 UD	—	October 17, 1984	Kleť	Z. Vávrová	·	8.6 km (5.3 mi)	MPC · JPL
9836 Aarseth	1985 TU	Aarseth	October 15, 1985	Anderson Mesa	E. Bowell	·	7.0 km (4.3 mi)	MPC · JPL
9837 Jerryhorow	1986 AA_{2}	Jerryhorow	January 12, 1986	Anderson Mesa	Horowitz, I.	·	11 km (6.8 mi)	MPC · JPL
9838 Falz-Fein	1987 RN_{6}	Falz-Fein	September 4, 1987	Nauchnij	L. V. Zhuravleva	·	13 km (8.1 mi)	MPC · JPL
9839 Crabbegat	1988 CT_{2}	Crabbegat	February 11, 1988	La Silla	E. W. Elst	·	6.3 km (3.9 mi)	MPC · JPL
9840	1988 RQ_{2}	—	September 8, 1988	Brorfelde	P. Jensen	·	13 km (8.1 mi)	MPC · JPL
9841 Mašek	1988 UT	Mašek	October 18, 1988	Kleť	Z. Vávrová	·	2.7 km (1.7 mi)	MPC · JPL
9842 Funakoshi	1989 AS_{1}	Funakoshi	January 15, 1989	Kitami	K. Endate, K. Watanabe	slow	3.6 km (2.2 mi)	MPC · JPL
9843 Braidwood	1989 AL_{3}	Braidwood	January 4, 1989	Siding Spring	R. H. McNaught	·	3.5 km (2.2 mi)	MPC · JPL
9844 Otani	1989 WF_{1}	Otani	November 23, 1989	Yatsugatake	Y. Kushida, O. Muramatsu	·	7.2 km (4.5 mi)	MPC · JPL
9845 Okamuraosamu	1990 FM_{1}	Okamuraosamu	March 27, 1990	Kitami	K. Endate, K. Watanabe	·	11 km (6.8 mi)	MPC · JPL
9846	1990 OS_{1}	—	July 29, 1990	Palomar	H. E. Holt	·	4.6 km (2.9 mi)	MPC · JPL
9847	1990 QJ_{5}	—	August 25, 1990	Palomar	H. E. Holt	NYS	3.1 km (1.9 mi)	MPC · JPL
9848 Yugra	1990 QX_{17}	Yugra	August 26, 1990	Nauchnij	L. V. Zhuravleva	NYS	4.2 km (2.6 mi)	MPC · JPL
9849	1990 RF_{2}	—	September 14, 1990	Palomar	H. E. Holt	NYS	4.9 km (3.0 mi)	MPC · JPL
9850 Ralphcopeland	1990 TM_{5}	Ralphcopeland	October 9, 1990	Siding Spring	R. H. McNaught	V	3.0 km (1.9 mi)	MPC · JPL
9851 Sakamoto	1990 UG_{3}	Sakamoto	October 24, 1990	Kitami	K. Endate, K. Watanabe	(5)	6.7 km (4.2 mi)	MPC · JPL
9852 Gora	1990 YX	Gora	December 24, 1990	Geisei	T. Seki	(5)	3.7 km (2.3 mi)	MPC · JPL
9853 l'Épée	1991 AN_{2}	l'Épée	January 7, 1991	Siding Spring	R. H. McNaught	slow	12 km (7.5 mi)	MPC · JPL
9854 Karlheinz	1991 AC_{3}	Karlheinz	January 15, 1991	Tautenburg Observatory	F. Börngen	·	5.2 km (3.2 mi)	MPC · JPL
9855 Thomasdick	1991 CU	Thomasdick	February 7, 1991	Siding Spring	R. H. McNaught	·	6.4 km (4.0 mi)	MPC · JPL
9856	1991 EE	—	March 13, 1991	Kitt Peak	Spacewatch	APO +1 km (0.62 mi) · PHA	1.0 km (0.62 mi)	MPC · JPL
9857 Hecamede	1991 EN	Hecamede	March 10, 1991	Siding Spring	R. H. McNaught	L4	50 km (31 mi)	MPC · JPL
9858	1991 OL_{1}	—	July 18, 1991	La Silla	H. Debehogne	THM	12 km (7.5 mi)	MPC · JPL
9859 Van Lierde	1991 PE_{5}	Van Lierde	August 3, 1991	La Silla	E. W. Elst	KOR	8.7 km (5.4 mi)	MPC · JPL
9860 Archaeopteryx	1991 PW_{9}	Archaeopteryx	August 6, 1991	La Silla	E. W. Elst	VER	12 km (7.5 mi)	MPC · JPL
9861 Jahreiss	1991 RB_{3}	Jahreiss	September 9, 1991	Tautenburg Observatory	L. D. Schmadel, F. Börngen	·	2.9 km (1.8 mi)	MPC · JPL
9862	1991 RA_{6}	—	September 13, 1991	Palomar	H. E. Holt	·	5.7 km (3.5 mi)	MPC · JPL
9863 Reichardt	1991 RJ_{7}	Reichardt	September 13, 1991	Tautenburg Observatory	F. Börngen, L. D. Schmadel	·	3.8 km (2.4 mi)	MPC · JPL
9864	1991 RT_{17}	—	September 13, 1991	Palomar	H. E. Holt	·	13 km (8.1 mi)	MPC · JPL
9865 Akiraohta	1991 TP_{1}	Akiraohta	October 3, 1991	Toyota	K. Suzuki, T. Urata	·	3.3 km (2.1 mi)	MPC · JPL
9866 Kanaimitsuo	1991 TV_{4}	Kanaimitsuo	October 15, 1991	Kiyosato	S. Otomo	·	3.5 km (2.2 mi)	MPC · JPL
9867	1991 VM	—	November 3, 1991	Yakiimo	Natori, A., T. Urata	·	4.5 km (2.8 mi)	MPC · JPL
9868	1991 VP_{1}	—	November 4, 1991	Kushiro	S. Ueda, H. Kaneda	·	3.5 km (2.2 mi)	MPC · JPL
9869 Yadoumaru	1992 CD_{1}	Yadoumaru	February 9, 1992	Kitami	K. Endate, K. Watanabe	·	5.5 km (3.4 mi)	MPC · JPL
9870 Maehata	1992 DA	Maehata	February 24, 1992	Geisei	T. Seki	·	4.1 km (2.5 mi)	MPC · JPL
9871 Jeon	1992 DG_{1}	Jeon	February 28, 1992	Kitami	T. Fujii, K. Watanabe	·	3.8 km (2.4 mi)	MPC · JPL
9872 Solf	1992 DJ_{4}	Solf	February 27, 1992	Tautenburg Observatory	F. Börngen	V	3.0 km (1.9 mi)	MPC · JPL
9873 Freundlich	1992 GH	Freundlich	April 9, 1992	Siding Spring	R. H. McNaught	H	5.4 km (3.4 mi)	MPC · JPL
9874	1993 FG_{23}	—	March 21, 1993	La Silla	UESAC	·	3.1 km (1.9 mi)	MPC · JPL
9875	1993 FH_{25}	—	March 21, 1993	La Silla	UESAC	·	7.0 km (4.3 mi)	MPC · JPL
9876	1993 FY_{37}	—	March 19, 1993	La Silla	UESAC	·	2.9 km (1.8 mi)	MPC · JPL
9877	1993 ST_{3}	—	September 18, 1993	Palomar	H. E. Holt	·	8.3 km (5.2 mi)	MPC · JPL
9878 Sostero	1994 FQ	Sostero	March 17, 1994	Farra d'Isonzo	Farra d'Isonzo	·	8.1 km (5.0 mi)	MPC · JPL
9879 Mammuthus	1994 PZ_{29}	Mammuthus	August 12, 1994	La Silla	E. W. Elst	ERI	4.7 km (2.9 mi)	MPC · JPL
9880 Stegosaurus	1994 PQ_{31}	Stegosaurus	August 12, 1994	La Silla	E. W. Elst	·	2.6 km (1.6 mi)	MPC · JPL
9881 Sampson	1994 SE	Sampson	September 25, 1994	Siding Spring	R. H. McNaught	·	2.5 km (1.6 mi)	MPC · JPL
9882 Stallman	1994 SS_{9}	Stallman	September 28, 1994	Kitt Peak	Spacewatch	·	4.2 km (2.6 mi)	MPC · JPL
9883 Veecas	1994 TU_{1}	Veecas	October 8, 1994	Camarillo Obs.	Rogers, J. E.	V	2.2 km (1.4 mi)	MPC · JPL
9884 Příbram	1994 TN_{3}	Příbram	October 12, 1994	Kleť	M. Tichý, Z. Moravec	MAS ·	4.7 km (2.9 mi)	MPC · JPL
9885 Linux	1994 TM_{14}	Linux	October 12, 1994	Kitt Peak	Spacewatch	V	4.6 km (2.9 mi)	MPC · JPL
9886 Aoyagi	1994 VM_{7}	Aoyagi	November 8, 1994	Kiyosato	S. Otomo	NYS	3.1 km (1.9 mi)	MPC · JPL
9887 Ashikaga	1995 AH	Ashikaga	January 2, 1995	Oizumi	T. Kobayashi	·	3.7 km (2.3 mi)	MPC · JPL
9888	1995 CD	—	February 1, 1995	Oizumi	T. Kobayashi	·	7.0 km (4.3 mi)	MPC · JPL
9889	1995 FG_{1}	—	March 28, 1995	Kushiro	S. Ueda, H. Kaneda	KOR	6.6 km (4.1 mi)	MPC · JPL
9890	1995 SY_{2}	—	September 20, 1995	Kushiro	S. Ueda, H. Kaneda	·	3.1 km (1.9 mi)	MPC · JPL
9891 Stephensmith	1995 XN_{1}	Stephensmith	December 15, 1995	Oizumi	T. Kobayashi	EUN	7.7 km (4.8 mi)	MPC · JPL
9892 Meigetsuki	1995 YN_{3}	Meigetsuki	December 27, 1995	Oizumi	T. Kobayashi	slow	3.6 km (2.2 mi)	MPC · JPL
9893 Sagano	1996 AA_{1}	Sagano	January 12, 1996	Oizumi	T. Kobayashi	·	3.4 km (2.1 mi)	MPC · JPL
9894	1996 BS_{1}	—	January 23, 1996	Oizumi	T. Kobayashi	·	4.5 km (2.8 mi)	MPC · JPL
9895	1996 BR_{3}	—	January 27, 1996	Oizumi	T. Kobayashi	·	4.5 km (2.8 mi)	MPC · JPL
9896	1996 BL_{17}	—	January 22, 1996	Socorro	Lincoln Lab ETS	·	4.7 km (2.9 mi)	MPC · JPL
9897 Malerba	1996 CX_{7}	Malerba	February 14, 1996	Asiago	M. Tombelli, U. Munari	·	3.1 km (1.9 mi)	MPC · JPL
9898 Yoshiro	1996 DF	Yoshiro	February 18, 1996	Oizumi	T. Kobayashi	·	5.3 km (3.3 mi)	MPC · JPL
9899 Greaves	1996 EH	Greaves	March 12, 1996	Siding Spring	R. H. McNaught	·	5.0 km (3.1 mi)	MPC · JPL
9900 Llull	1997 LL_{6}	Llull	June 13, 1997	Majorca	Blasco, M.	slow	3.7 km (2.3 mi)	MPC · JPL

== 9901–10000 ==
back to top

Designation			Discovery			Properties		Ref
Permanent	Provisional	Named after	Date	Site	Discoverer(s)	Category	Diam.	Ref
9901	1997 NV	—	July 1, 1997	Kleť	Kleť	V	3.0 km (1.9 mi)	MPC · JPL
9902 Kirkpatrick	1997 NY	Kirkpatrick	July 3, 1997	Prescott	P. G. Comba	·	3.6 km (2.2 mi)	MPC · JPL
9903 Leonhardt	1997 NA_{1}	Leonhardt	July 4, 1997	Prescott	P. G. Comba	·	8.5 km (5.3 mi)	MPC · JPL
9904 Mauratombelli	1997 OC_{1}	Mauratombelli	July 29, 1997	San Marcello	A. Boattini, L. Tesi	·	7.6 km (4.7 mi)	MPC · JPL
9905 Tiziano	4611 P-L	Tiziano	September 24, 1960	Palomar	C. J. van Houten, I. van Houten-Groeneveld, T. Gehrels	PHO	5.2 km (3.2 mi)	MPC · JPL
9906 Tintoretto	6523 P-L	Tintoretto	September 26, 1960	Palomar	C. J. van Houten, I. van Houten-Groeneveld, T. Gehrels	EUN	6.5 km (4.0 mi)	MPC · JPL
9907 Oileus	6541 P-L	Oileus	September 24, 1960	Palomar	C. J. van Houten, I. van Houten-Groeneveld, T. Gehrels	L4	30 km (19 mi)	MPC · JPL
9908 Aue	2140 T-1	Aue	March 25, 1971	Palomar	C. J. van Houten, I. van Houten-Groeneveld, T. Gehrels	KOR	7.0 km (4.3 mi)	MPC · JPL
9909 Eschenbach	4355 T-1	Eschenbach	March 26, 1971	Palomar	C. J. van Houten, I. van Houten-Groeneveld, T. Gehrels	·	3.4 km (2.1 mi)	MPC · JPL
9910 Vogelweide	3181 T-2	Vogelweide	September 30, 1973	Palomar	C. J. van Houten, I. van Houten-Groeneveld, T. Gehrels	slow	6.0 km (3.7 mi)	MPC · JPL
9911 Quantz	4129 T-2	Quantz	September 29, 1973	Palomar	C. J. van Houten, I. van Houten-Groeneveld, T. Gehrels	·	3.2 km (2.0 mi)	MPC · JPL
9912 Donizetti	2078 T-3	Donizetti	October 16, 1977	Palomar	C. J. van Houten, I. van Houten-Groeneveld, T. Gehrels	RAF	6.9 km (4.3 mi)	MPC · JPL
9913 Humperdinck	4071 T-3	Humperdinck	October 16, 1977	Palomar	C. J. van Houten, I. van Houten-Groeneveld, T. Gehrels	·	6.0 km (3.7 mi)	MPC · JPL
9914 Obukhova	1976 UJ_{4}	Obukhova	October 28, 1976	Nauchnij	L. V. Zhuravleva	MIS	8.6 km (5.3 mi)	MPC · JPL
9915 Potanin	1977 RD_{2}	Potanin	September 8, 1977	Nauchnij	N. S. Chernykh	·	12 km (7.5 mi)	MPC · JPL
9916 Kibirev	1978 TR_{2}	Kibirev	October 3, 1978	Nauchnij	N. S. Chernykh	KOR	6.2 km (3.9 mi)	MPC · JPL
9917 Keynes	1979 MK	Keynes	June 26, 1979	Cerro El Roble	C. Torres	V	4.1 km (2.5 mi)	MPC · JPL
9918 Timtrenkle	1979 MK_{3}	Timtrenkle	June 25, 1979	Siding Spring	E. F. Helin, S. J. Bus	HYG	11 km (6.8 mi)	MPC · JPL
9919 Undset	1979 QF_{1}	Undset	August 22, 1979	La Silla	C.-I. Lagerkvist	NYS	2.5 km (1.6 mi)	MPC · JPL
9920 Bagnulo	1981 EZ_{10}	Bagnulo	March 1, 1981	Siding Spring	S. J. Bus	HOF	13 km (8.1 mi)	MPC · JPL
9921 Rubincam	1981 EO_{18}	Rubincam	March 2, 1981	Siding Spring	S. J. Bus	·	4.2 km (2.6 mi)	MPC · JPL
9922 Catcheller	1981 EO_{21}	Catcheller	March 2, 1981	Siding Spring	S. J. Bus	NYS	2.6 km (1.6 mi)	MPC · JPL
9923 Ronaldthiel	1981 EB_{24}	Ronaldthiel	March 7, 1981	Siding Spring	S. J. Bus	AGN	4.1 km (2.5 mi)	MPC · JPL
9924 Corrigan	1981 EM_{24}	Corrigan	March 2, 1981	Siding Spring	S. J. Bus	AGN	4.4 km (2.7 mi)	MPC · JPL
9925 Juliehoskin	1981 EU_{24}	Juliehoskin	March 2, 1981	Siding Spring	S. J. Bus	·	4.9 km (3.0 mi)	MPC · JPL
9926 Desch	1981 EU_{41}	Desch	March 2, 1981	Siding Spring	S. J. Bus	·	1.9 km (1.2 mi)	MPC · JPL
9927 Tyutchev	1981 TW_{1}	Tyutchev	October 3, 1981	Nauchnij	L. G. Karachkina	·	2.4 km (1.5 mi)	MPC · JPL
9928	1981 WE_{9}	—	November 16, 1981	Bickley	Perth Observatory	·	2.4 km (1.5 mi)	MPC · JPL
9929 McConnell	1982 DP_{1}	McConnell	February 24, 1982	Harvard Observatory	Oak Ridge Observatory	slow	3.5 km (2.2 mi)	MPC · JPL
9930 Billburrows	1984 CP	Billburrows	February 5, 1984	Anderson Mesa	E. Bowell	·	7.8 km (4.8 mi)	MPC · JPL
9931 Herbhauptman	1985 HH	Herbhauptman	April 18, 1985	Kleť	A. Mrkos	NYS	5.2 km (3.2 mi)	MPC · JPL
9932 Kopylov	1985 QP_{5}	Kopylov	August 23, 1985	Nauchnij	N. S. Chernykh	·	6.5 km (4.0 mi)	MPC · JPL
9933 Alekseev	1985 SM_{3}	Alekseev	September 19, 1985	Nauchnij	N. S. Chernykh, L. I. Chernykh	·	3.5 km (2.2 mi)	MPC · JPL
9934 Caccioppoli	1985 UC	Caccioppoli	October 20, 1985	Anderson Mesa	E. Bowell	·	7.7 km (4.8 mi)	MPC · JPL
9935	1986 CP_{1}	—	February 4, 1986	La Silla	H. Debehogne	·	11 km (6.8 mi)	MPC · JPL
9936 Al-Biruni	1986 PN_{4}	Al-Biruni	August 8, 1986	Smolyan	E. W. Elst, V. G. Ivanova	·	24 km (15 mi)	MPC · JPL
9937 Triceratops	1988 DJ_{2}	Triceratops	February 17, 1988	La Silla	E. W. Elst	NYS	3.8 km (2.4 mi)	MPC · JPL
9938 Kretlow	1988 KA	Kretlow	May 18, 1988	La Silla	W. Landgraf	·	3.7 km (2.3 mi)	MPC · JPL
9939	1988 VK	—	November 3, 1988	Chiyoda	T. Kojima	·	3.9 km (2.4 mi)	MPC · JPL
9940	1988 VM_{3}	—	November 11, 1988	Gekko	Y. Oshima	moon	3.1 km (1.9 mi)	MPC · JPL
9941 Iguanodon	1989 CB_{3}	Iguanodon	February 4, 1989	La Silla	E. W. Elst	fast	3.1 km (1.9 mi)	MPC · JPL
9942	1989 TM_{1}	—	October 8, 1989	Okutama	Hioki, T., N. Kawasato	·	4.1 km (2.5 mi)	MPC · JPL
9943 Bizan	1989 UG_{3}	Bizan	October 29, 1989	Tokushima	M. Iwamoto, T. Furuta	·	5.5 km (3.4 mi)	MPC · JPL
9944	1990 DA_{3}	—	February 24, 1990	La Silla	H. Debehogne	KOR	5.4 km (3.4 mi)	MPC · JPL
9945 Karinaxavier	1990 KX	Karinaxavier	May 21, 1990	Palomar	E. F. Helin	·	4.4 km (2.7 mi)	MPC · JPL
9946	1990 ON_{2}	—	July 29, 1990	Palomar	H. E. Holt	·	2.7 km (1.7 mi)	MPC · JPL
9947 Takaishuji	1990 QB	Takaishuji	August 17, 1990	Palomar	E. F. Helin	PHO	3.4 km (2.1 mi)	MPC · JPL
9948	1990 QB_{2}	—	August 22, 1990	Palomar	H. E. Holt	NYS	3.3 km (2.1 mi)	MPC · JPL
9949 Brontosaurus	1990 SK_{6}	Brontosaurus	September 22, 1990	La Silla	E. W. Elst	V	4.4 km (2.7 mi)	MPC · JPL
9950 ESA	1990 VB	ESA	November 8, 1990	Caussols	C. Pollas	AMO +1 km (0.62 mi)	2.0 km (1.2 mi)	MPC · JPL
9951 Tyrannosaurus	1990 VK_{5}	Tyrannosaurus	November 15, 1990	La Silla	E. W. Elst	·	5.3 km (3.3 mi)	MPC · JPL
9952	1991 AK	—	January 9, 1991	Yorii	M. Arai, H. Mori	·	7.3 km (4.5 mi)	MPC · JPL
9953	1991 EB	—	March 7, 1991	Kushiro	S. Ueda, H. Kaneda	·	5.3 km (3.3 mi)	MPC · JPL
9954 Brachiosaurus	1991 GX_{7}	Brachiosaurus	April 8, 1991	La Silla	E. W. Elst	·	9.3 km (5.8 mi)	MPC · JPL
9955	1991 PU_{11}	—	August 7, 1991	Palomar	H. E. Holt	·	5.7 km (3.5 mi)	MPC · JPL
9956 Castellaz	1991 TX_{4}	Castellaz	October 5, 1991	Tautenburg Observatory	L. D. Schmadel, F. Börngen	·	3.8 km (2.4 mi)	MPC · JPL
9957 Raffaellosanti	1991 TO_{13}	Raffaellosanti	October 6, 1991	Tautenburg Observatory	F. Börngen	·	5.2 km (3.2 mi)	MPC · JPL
9958	1991 VL_{1}	—	November 4, 1991	Kushiro	S. Ueda, H. Kaneda	·	3.8 km (2.4 mi)	MPC · JPL
9959	1991 VF_{2}	—	November 9, 1991	Kushiro	S. Ueda, H. Kaneda	·	3.1 km (1.9 mi)	MPC · JPL
9960 Sekine	1991 VE_{4}	Sekine	November 4, 1991	Kiyosato	S. Otomo	·	3.2 km (2.0 mi)	MPC · JPL
9961	1991 XK	—	December 4, 1991	Kushiro	S. Ueda, H. Kaneda	·	3.4 km (2.1 mi)	MPC · JPL
9962 Pfau	1991 YL_{1}	Pfau	December 28, 1991	Tautenburg Observatory	F. Börngen	·	3.1 km (1.9 mi)	MPC · JPL
9963 Sandage	1992 AN	Sandage	January 9, 1992	Palomar	E. F. Helin	PHO	6.4 km (4.0 mi)	MPC · JPL
9964 Hideyonoguchi	1992 CF_{1}	Hideyonoguchi	February 13, 1992	Geisei	T. Seki	·	8.1 km (5.0 mi)	MPC · JPL
9965 GNU	1992 EF_{2}	GNU	March 5, 1992	Kitt Peak	Spacewatch	PHO	6.3 km (3.9 mi)	MPC · JPL
9966	1992 ES_{13}	—	March 2, 1992	La Silla	UESAC	NYS ·	5.0 km (3.1 mi)	MPC · JPL
9967 Awanoyumi	1992 FV_{1}	Awanoyumi	March 31, 1992	Kitami	K. Endate, K. Watanabe	slow	9.5 km (5.9 mi)	MPC · JPL
9968 Serpe	1992 JS_{2}	Serpe	May 4, 1992	La Silla	H. Debehogne	·	12 km (7.5 mi)	MPC · JPL
9969 Braille	1992 KD	Braille	May 27, 1992	Palomar	E. F. Helin, K. J. Lawrence	slow	2.4 km (1.5 mi)	MPC · JPL
9970	1992 ST_{1}	—	September 26, 1992	Dynic	A. Sugie	DOR	20 km (12 mi)	MPC · JPL
9971 Ishihara	1993 HS	Ishihara	April 16, 1993	Kitami	K. Endate, K. Watanabe	·	5.0 km (3.1 mi)	MPC · JPL
9972 Minoruoda	1993 KQ	Minoruoda	May 26, 1993	Kiyosato	S. Otomo	moon	8.8 km (5.5 mi)	MPC · JPL
9973 Szpilman	1993 NB_{2}	Szpilman	July 12, 1993	La Silla	E. W. Elst	·	4.3 km (2.7 mi)	MPC · JPL
9974 Brody	1993 OG_{13}	Brody	July 19, 1993	La Silla	E. W. Elst	NYS	3.9 km (2.4 mi)	MPC · JPL
9975 Takimotokoso	1993 RZ_{1}	Takimotokoso	September 12, 1993	Kitami	K. Endate, K. Watanabe	·	5.8 km (3.6 mi)	MPC · JPL
9976	1993 TQ	—	October 9, 1993	Hidaka	Shirai, S., Hayakawa, S.	·	14 km (8.7 mi)	MPC · JPL
9977 Kentakunimoto	1994 AH	Kentakunimoto	January 2, 1994	Oizumi	T. Kobayashi	KOR	7.7 km (4.8 mi)	MPC · JPL
9978	1994 AJ_{1}	—	January 7, 1994	Oizumi	T. Kobayashi	EOS	8.7 km (5.4 mi)	MPC · JPL
9979	1994 VT	—	November 3, 1994	Oizumi	T. Kobayashi	·	3.1 km (1.9 mi)	MPC · JPL
9980	1995 BQ_{3}	—	January 31, 1995	Oizumi	T. Kobayashi	·	5.9 km (3.7 mi)	MPC · JPL
9981 Kudo	1995 BS_{3}	Kudo	January 31, 1995	Oizumi	T. Kobayashi	·	5.6 km (3.5 mi)	MPC · JPL
9982	1995 CH	—	February 1, 1995	Oizumi	T. Kobayashi	EUN	4.1 km (2.5 mi)	MPC · JPL
9983 Rickfienberg	1995 DA	Rickfienberg	February 19, 1995	Sudbury	D. di Cicco	·	7.4 km (4.6 mi)	MPC · JPL
9984 Gregbryant	1996 HT	Gregbryant	April 18, 1996	Macquarie	R. H. McNaught, Child, J. B.	·	11 km (6.8 mi)	MPC · JPL
9985 Akiko	1996 JF	Akiko	May 12, 1996	Yatsuka	R. H. McNaught, H. Abe	·	3.0 km (1.9 mi)	MPC · JPL
9986 Hirokun	1996 NX	Hirokun	July 12, 1996	Nachi-Katsuura	Y. Shimizu, T. Urata	MAR	8.0 km (5.0 mi)	MPC · JPL
9987 Peano	1997 OO_{1}	Peano	July 29, 1997	Prescott	P. G. Comba	·	2.5 km (1.6 mi)	MPC · JPL
9988 Erictemplebell	1997 RX_{6}	Erictemplebell	September 9, 1997	Prescott	P. G. Comba	KOR	7.1 km (4.4 mi)	MPC · JPL
9989	1997 SG_{16}	—	September 27, 1997	Uenohara	N. Kawasato	KOR	6.7 km (4.2 mi)	MPC · JPL
9990 Niiyaeki	1997 SO_{17}	Niiyaeki	September 30, 1997	Nanyo	T. Okuni	KOR	5.2 km (3.2 mi)	MPC · JPL
9991 Anežka	1997 TY_{7}	Anežka	October 5, 1997	Kleť	Z. Moravec	THM	12 km (7.5 mi)	MPC · JPL
9992	1997 TG_{19}	—	October 8, 1997	Gekko	T. Kagawa, T. Urata	·	3.4 km (2.1 mi)	MPC · JPL
9993 Kumamoto	1997 VX_{5}	Kumamoto	November 6, 1997	Kumamoto	Kobayashi, J.	·	6.4 km (4.0 mi)	MPC · JPL
9994 Grotius	4028 P-L	Grotius	September 24, 1960	Palomar	C. J. van Houten, I. van Houten-Groeneveld, T. Gehrels	RAF	3.7 km (2.3 mi)	MPC · JPL
9995 Alouette	4805 P-L	Alouette	September 24, 1960	Palomar	C. J. van Houten, I. van Houten-Groeneveld, T. Gehrels	NYS	2.6 km (1.6 mi)	MPC · JPL
9996 ANS	9070 P-L	ANS	October 17, 1960	Palomar	C. J. van Houten, I. van Houten-Groeneveld, T. Gehrels	DOR	9.0 km (5.6 mi)	MPC · JPL
9997 COBE	1217 T-1	COBE	March 25, 1971	Palomar	C. J. van Houten, I. van Houten-Groeneveld, T. Gehrels	·	4.6 km (2.9 mi)	MPC · JPL
9998 ISO	1293 T-1	ISO	March 25, 1971	Palomar	C. J. van Houten, I. van Houten-Groeneveld, T. Gehrels	·	2.2 km (1.4 mi)	MPC · JPL
9999 Wiles	4196 T-2	Wiles	September 29, 1973	Palomar	C. J. van Houten, I. van Houten-Groeneveld, T. Gehrels	KOR	7.1 km (4.4 mi)	MPC · JPL
10000 Myriostos	1951 SY	Myriostos	September 30, 1951	Palomar	A. G. Wilson	slow	3.4 km (2.1 mi)	MPC · JPL

back to top

== See also ==
- Meanings of minor-planet names: 9001–10000
