= Meanings of minor-planet names: 9001–10000 =

As minor planet discoveries are confirmed, they are given a permanent number by the IAU's Minor Planet Center (MPC), and the discoverers can then submit names for them, following the IAU's naming conventions. The list below concerns those minor planets in the specified number-range that have received names, and explains the meanings of those names.

Official naming citations of newly named small Solar System bodies are approved and published in a bulletin by IAU's Working Group for Small Bodies Nomenclature (WGSBN). Before May 2021, citations were published in MPC's Minor Planet Circulars for many decades. Recent citations can also be found on the JPL Small-Body Database (SBDB). Until his death in 2016, German astronomer Lutz D. Schmadel compiled these citations into the Dictionary of Minor Planet Names (DMP) and regularly updated the collection.

Based on Paul Herget's The Names of the Minor Planets, Schmadel also researched the unclear origin of numerous asteroids, most of which had been named prior to World War II. This article incorporates text from this source, which is in the public domain: SBDB New namings may only be added to this list below after official publication as the preannouncement of names is condemned. The WGSBN publishes a comprehensive guideline for the naming rules of non-cometary small Solar System bodies.

Named minor planet	Provisional	This minor planet was named for...	Ref · Catalog
9001 Slettebak	1981 QE_{2}	Arne Slettebak was for 25 years chair of the department of astronomy of the Ohio State University.	JPL · 9001
9002 Gabrynowicz	1981 QV_{2}	Joanne Irene Gabrynowicz (1949) is Emerita Professor, Director of the National Center for Remote Sensing, Air, and Space Law of the University of Mississippi School of Law, and Editor-in-Chief of the Journal of Space Law.	JPL · 9002
9003 Ralphmilliken	1981 UW_{21}	Ralph E. Milliken (born 1978), a planetary science professor at Brown University.	JPL · 9003
9004 Peekaydee	1982 UZ_{2}	Philip K. Dick (1928–1982), an American science fiction author.	JPL · 9004
9005 Sidorova	1982 UU_{5}	Sophia Ivanovna Sidorova (born 1943), public education worker in Ukraine and leader of the Crimean Republic Committee for the education of workers.	JPL · 9005
9006 Voytkevych	1982 UA_{7}	Vanda Georgievna Voytkevych (born 1949), friend of astronomer Lyudmila Karachkina who discovered this asteroid	MPC · 9006
9007 James Bond	1983 TE_{1}	James Bond, "agent 007", fictional British spy	MPC · 9007
9008 Bohšternberk	1984 BS	Bohumil Šternberk (1897–1983), Czech astronomer	MPC · 9008
9009 Tirso	1984 HJ_{1}	Thyrsus (Tirso), the scepter of Dionysus; Italian initialism of the Circolo eno-g-astronomico TIRSO (for "all together enjoying, studying, observing"), a scientific and cultural circle	JPL · 9009
9010 Candelo	1984 HM_{1}	Candelo, Italy, a small town in northern Piedmont	JPL · 9010
9011 Angelou	1984 SU	Maya Angelou (1928–2014), born Marguerite Annie Johnson, an American poet, author, and civil rights activist	JPL · 9011
9012 Benner	1984 UW	Lance A. M. Benner (born 1964), an American radio astronomer at the Jet Propulsion Laboratory (Src).	JPL · 9012
9013 Sansaturio	1985 PA_{1}	Maria Eugenia Sansaturio (born 1959), a mathematician at the University of Valladolid.	JPL · 9013
9014 Svyatorichter	1985 UG_{5}	Svyatoslav Richter (1915–1997), Russian pianist and People's artist of the U.S.S.R.	JPL · 9014
9015 Coe	1985 VK	Malcolm Coe (born 1949) is Professor of Astronomy at the University of Southampton in the U.K.	JPL · 9015
9016 Henrymoore	1986 AE	Henry J. Moore (1928–1998), a geologist with the U.S. Geological Survey since 1960.	JPL · 9016
9017 Babadzhanyan	1986 TW_{9}	Arno Babajanian (1921–1983), a Soviet composer and pianist.	JPL · 9017
9018 Galache	1987 JG	José Luis Galache (born 1975) has worked at the Minor Planet Center (MPC) since 2009.	JPL · 9018
9019 Eucommia	1987 QF_{3}	Eucommiaceae, a family with only one member, the elmlike Eucommia ulmoides, a vigorous and decorative plant. It is the only tree from temperate regions that produces latex in small quantities.	JPL · 9019
9020 Eucryphia	1987 SG_{2}	Eucryphiaceae, a family with five species in a single genus. Eucryphia cordifolia (Chilean elm) may reach a height of 12 m. Hybrids between the different species are cultivated for the garden.	JPL · 9020
9021 Fagus	1988 CT_{5}	Fagaceae, the beech family, with eight genera and over 1000 species, including oaks and chestnuts. Well-known species are Fagus grandifolia (American beech) and Fagus sylvatica (European beech).	JPL · 9021
9022 Drake	1988 PC_{1}	Michael J. Drake (born 1946), American cosmochemist and geochemist	MPC · 9022
9023 Mnesthus	1988 RG_{1}	Mnestheus from Greek mythology.	JPL · 9023
9024 Gunnargraps	1988 RF_{9}	Gunnar Graps (1951–2004)	JPL · 9024
9025 Polanskey	1988 SM_{2}	Carol A. Polanskey (born 1960), a science operations expert at the Jet Propulsion Laboratory.	JPL · 9025
9026 Denevi	1988 ST_{2}	Brett W. Denevi (born 1980), a planetary scientist at the Johns Hopkins University Applied Physics Laboratory and an expert in the composition and evolution of asteroid surfaces.	JPL · 9026
9027 Graps	1988 VP_{5}	Amara Graps (born 1961) is a planetary scientist.	JPL · 9027
9028 Konrádbeneš	1989 BE_{1}	Konrád Beneš (1920–1999), Czech planetologist	MPC · 9028
9030 Othryoneus	1989 UX_{5}	Othryoneus, from Greek mythology, who had taken part in the Trojan War in exchange for being allowed to marry Cassandra, King Priam's daughter. He was killed by Idomeneus during the Battle of the Ships.	IAU · 9030
9032 Tanakami	1989 WK_{4}	Tanakami, extending over Shiga, Mie and Kyoto prefectures, is the site of the largest meteorite found in Japan.	JPL · 9032
9033 Kawane	1990 AD	Kawane, a small town about 230 km west of Tokyo.	JPL · 9033
9034 Oleyuria	1990 QZ_{17}	Oleyuria, Ukrainian piano duo of Olga Scherbakova and Yuri Scherbakov.	JPL · 9034
9038 Helensteel	1990 VE_{1}	Helen Margaret Steel (born 1959), wife of discoverer Duncan Steel	MPC · 9038
9040 Flacourtia	1991 BH_{1}	Flacourtiaceae, the Indian plum family, with almost 90 genera and 900 species. Flacourtia indica (governor's plum) is one of the species, and the southeast Asian genus Hydnocarpus produces an oil that is used for treating some skin diseases.	JPL · 9040
9041 Takane	1991 CX	Takane, name of the town in which the Otomo observatory is located.	JPL · 9041
9044 Kaoru	1991 KA	Kaoru Ikeya (born 1964), lecturer and curator of the Gotoh Planetarium and Astronomical Museum in Tokyo.	JPL · 9044
9052 Uhland	1991 UJ_{4}	Johann Ludwig Uhland (1787–1862), a German poet.	JPL · 9052
9053 Hamamelis	1991 VW_{5}	Hamamelidaceae, the witch-hazel family, with about 25 genera and 100 species, typical in South America and Africa. Hamamelis virginiana (witch hazel) is not a true hazel, although the leaves are similar.	JPL · 9053
9054 Hippocastanum	1991 YO	Hippocastanaceae, the horse-chestnut family, with only two genera and 15 species. Aesculus hippocastanum (common horse-chestnut) is known for its creamy yellow flowers, in large, conical, upright panicles.	JPL · 9054
9055 Edvardsson	1992 DP_{8}	Bengt Edvardsson (born 1956), Swedish astronomer	MPC · 9055
9056 Piskunov	1992 EQ_{14}	Nikolai Piskunov (born 1957), Swedish astrophysicist	MPC · 9056
9059 Dumas	1992 PJ	Alexandre Dumas (1802–1870), the grandson of a French marquis and the son of a French general in Napoleon's army, a very well known writer.	JPL · 9059
9060 Toyokawa	1992 RM	Hideji Toyokawa (1926–1995), a curator of the Gotoh Planetarium and Astronomical Museum in Tokyo.	JPL · 9060
9062 Ohnishi	1992 WO_{5}	Michikazu Ohnishi (born 1933) is a chemical plant engineer and lecturer in descriptive geometry.	JPL · 9062
9063 Washi	1992 YS	Shinsho Washi (born 1951), the director of the Sakai City Planetarium.	JPL · 9063
9064 Johndavies	1993 BH_{8}	John Keith Davies (born 1955), British astronomer/aviation engineer †	MPC · 9064
9067 Katsuno	1993 HR	Gentaro Katsuno (born 1933), chief editor of Gekkan Tenmon Guide ("Monthly Astronomy Guide") from 1975 to 1987	JPL · 9067
9069 Hovland	1993 OV	Larry E. Hovland (born 1947), a senior engineer at the Jet Propulsion Laboratory.	JPL · 9069
9070 Ensab	1993 OZ_{2}	Leo Enright (born 1943) and Denise Sabatini (born 1950), Canadian astronomers	MPC · 9070
9071 Coudenberghe	1993 OB_{13}	Peeter van Coudenberghe (1520–1594), Flemish botanist and pharmacist	JPL · 9071
9073 Yoshinori	1994 ER	Yoshinori Kobayashi (born 1929), a professor emeritus at Hiroshima University and professor at Tokushima Bunri University.	JPL · 9073
9074 Yosukeyoshida	1994 FZ	Yosuke Yoshida (born 1945), chief editor of Gekkan Tenmon Guide ("Monthly Astronomy Guide") from 1988 to 1993.	JPL · 9074
9076 Shinsaku	1994 JT	Shinsaku Takasugi (1839–1867)	MPC · 9076
9077 Ildo	1994 NC	Ildo Lombardi (1934–1954), Italian gymnast and brother of Giuseppe Lombardi, a member of a team of amateur astronomers.	JPL · 9077
9079 Gesner	1994 PC_{34}	Conrad Gessner (1516–1565), a versatile Swiss naturalist and bibliographer	JPL · 9079
9080 Takayanagi	1994 TP	Yuichi Takayanagi (born 1939)	JPL · 9080
9081 Hideakianno	1994 VY	Hideaki Anno (born 1960), a Japanese animator and director.	JPL · 9081
9082 Leonardmartin	1994 VR_{6}	Leonard J. Martin, planetary astronomer and cartographer at the Lowell Observatory.	JPL · 9082
9083 Ramboehm	1994 WC_{4}	Jeff Ramos (born 1962) and Art Boehm (born 1944), friends of the discoverers Carolyn Shoemaker and David H. Levy.	JPL · 9083
9084 Achristou	1995 CS_{1}	Apostolos Christou (born 1968), Planetary astronomer at the Irish Armagh Observatory	MPC · 9084
9087 Neff	1995 SN_{3}	Vladimír Neff (1909–1983), Czech novelist and his son Ondřej Neff (born 1945), science fiction author	MPC · 9087
9088 Maki	1995 SX_{3}	Fusao Maki (1916–2001), a songwriter who wrote many children's songs, school songs, home songs, and citizen's songs, and left hundreds of works.	JPL · 9088
9090 Chirotenmondai	1995 UW_{8}	Chiro Astronomical Observatory (320) or Chiro tenmondai in Western Australia. It was founded by Australian and Japanese amateur astronomers in 1995.	JPL · 9090
9091 Ishidatakaki	1995 VK	Takaki Ishida (born 1948), principal of Sanyo Girls' High and Junior High School in Hatsukaichi City, Hiroshima Prefecture.	JPL · 9091
9092 Nanyang	1995 VU_{18}	Nanyang City, in the southwest of Henan Province	JPL · 9092
9093 Sorada	1995 WA	Toshiyuki Sorada (born 1954), an amateur astronomer in Hiroshima City.	JPL · 9093
9094 Butsuen	1995 WH	Kazunari Butsuen (born 1952), an amateur astronomer in Kure City, Hiroshima Prefecture.	JPL · 9094
9096 Tamotsu	1995 XE_{1}	Tamotsu Fujii (born 1947), a member of the Oriental Astronomical Association since 1960 and president of the Yamashiro Astronomical Association since its founding in 1962.	JPL · 9096
9097 Davidschlag	1996 AU_{1}	Davidschlag, Upper Austria, small Austrian village, some 10 km to the north of Linz, at the entrance to the Sterngartl ("small garden of stars") region, home of the Privatobservatorium Meyer/Obermair (Private Observatory Meyer/Obermair) †	MPC · 9097
9098 Toshihiko	1996 BQ_{3}	Toshihiko Osawa (1935–2001)	JPL · 9098
9099 Kenjitanabe	1996 VN_{3}	Kenji Tanabe (born 1944), a professor at Okayama University of Science.	JPL · 9099
9100 Tomohisa	1996 XU_{1}	Tomohisa Ohno (born 1948), a Japanese amateur astronomer.	JPL · 9100

== 9101–9200 ==
back to top

Named minor planet	Provisional	This minor planet was named for...	Ref · Catalog
9101 Rossiglione	1996 XG_{2}	Rossiglione.	JPL · 9101
9102 Foglar	1996 XS_{18}	Jaroslav Foglar (1907–1999), Czech children's author	MPC · 9102
9103 Komatsubara	1996 XW_{30}	Mitsugu Komatsubara (born 1953), a Japanese reporter and amateur astronomer.	JPL · 9103
9104 Matsuo	1996 YB	Atsushi Matsuo (born 1955), Japanese astronomy educator and historian	JPL · 9104
9105 Matsumura	1997 AU	Masafumi Matsumura (born 1955), Japanese astronomer	JPL · 9105
9106 Yatagarasu	1997 AY_{1}	Yatagarasu, the holy crow with three legs of Japanese mythology, who guided Jinmu, the so-called first emperor, and his troops from Kumano to Nara (The Chinese counterpart of the crow with three legs is said to live in the Sun, and could be a naked-eye sunspot)	JPL · 9106
9107 Narukospa	1997 AE_{4}	Naruko, Miyagi (Naruko Onsen)	JPL · 9107
9108 Toruyusa	1997 AZ_{6}	Toru Yusa (born 1966) is director of the planetarium and observatory at the Osaki Lifelong Learning Center in Miyagi Prefecture and a member of the board of directors of the Japan Public Observatory Society.	JPL · 9108
9109 Yukomotizuki	1997 AH_{7}	Yuko Motizuki (born 1965) is an associate professor at Saitama University. Her speciality is the theoretical study of nucleosynthesis, supernovae and neutron stars. She is also leading a team to examine the effects of solar cycles and supernovae on Antarctic ice cores	JPL · 9109
9110 Choukai	1997 AM_{19}	Mount Choukai (2230 m) and the Choukai volcanic mountain range, Japan, national park and part of the border between Akita and Yamagata prefectures	JPL · 9110
9111 Matarazzo	1997 BD_{2}	Giuseppe "Corrado" Matarazzo (born 1946), Italian mathematician from Sicily, amateur astronomer and orbit computer. In 1995 he co-authored Elementi di Calcolo delle Orbite.	JPL · 9111
9112 Hatsulars	1997 BU_{3}	Hatsulars is the name of a women's chorus. Its members are mainly housewives of farming families of Kakegawa City.	JPL · 9112
9114 Hatakeyama	1997 CU_{19}	Hideo Hatakeyama (born 1955)	JPL · 9114
9115 Battisti	1997 DG	Lucio Battisti (1943–1998), Italian singer (Src)	MPC · 9115
9116 Billhamilton	1997 ES_{40}	William O. Hamilton (born 1933), American professor of physics and astronomy at Louisiana State University. (Src)	JPL · 9116
9117 Aude	1997 FR_{1}	AUDÉ, the Association des utilisateurs de détecteurs électroniques; users of electronic detectors association	JPL · 9117
9119 Georgpeuerbach	1998 DT	Georg von Peuerbach (1423–1461), Austrian mathematician, astronomer, poet, early humanist and teacher of Regiomontanus	MPC · 9119
9121 Stefanovalentini	1998 DJ_{11}	Stefano Valentini (born 1955), Italian amateur astronomer, software developer and creator of WinAstrometry	MPC · 9121
9122 Hunten	1998 FZ_{8}	Donald M. Hunten (1925–2010), American astronomer, who has participated in space missions from Pioneer to Cassini	JPL · 9122
9123 Yoshiko	1998 FQ_{11}	Yoshiko Nakano (born 1933), Japanese director of the Gekko Observatory and educator	JPL · 9123
9126 Samcoulson	1998 FR_{64}	Samuel Harold Coulson (born 1998) is a finalist in the 2012 Broadcom MASTERS, a math and science competition for middle-school students, for his earth and space sciences project	JPL · 9126
9127 Brucekoehn	1998 HX_{51}	Bruce W. Koehn (born 1948), American astronomer and software developer. His software has been used by the LONEOS program.	MPC · 9127
9128 Takatumuzi	1998 HQ_{52}	Mount Takatumuzi (693 m), Japan, east of Nanyo city, Yamagata prefecture, where the discovery site is located	JPL · 9128
9130 Galois	1998 HQ_{148}	Évariste Galois (1811–1832), French mathematician and contributor to group theory	MPC · 9130
9132 Walteranderson	2821 P-L	Walter Anderson (born 1953), chief executive officer of Entreé International	JPL · 9132
9133 d'Arrest	3107 P-L	Heinrich Louis d'Arrest (1822–1875), a German astronomer	JPL · 9133
9134 Encke	4822 P-L	Johann Franz Encke (1791–1865), an eminent German astronomer	JPL · 9134
9135 Lacaille	7609 P-L	Nicolas Louis de Lacaille (1713–1762), a French astronomer	JPL · 9135
9136 Lalande	4886 T-1	Jérôme Lalande (1732–1807), a French astronomer	JPL · 9136
9137 Remo	2114 T-2	John L. Remo (born 1941), American physicist	MPC · 9137
9138 Murdoch	2280 T-2	Jean Iris Murdoch (1919–1999), a prolific novelist and philosopher	JPL · 9138
9139 Barrylasker	4180 T-2	Barry Lasker (1939–1999), American astronomer	JPL · 9139
9140 Deni	4195 T-3	the Department of Education for Northern Ireland (Deni), for its support of the Armagh Observatory	JPL · 9140
9141 Kapur	5174 T-3	Shekhar Kapur (born 1945), Indian actor	MPC · 9141
9142 Rhesus	5191 T-3	Rhesus of Thrace, the king of the Thracians and ally of the Trojans	JPL · 9142
9143 Burkhead	1955 SF	Martin S. Burkhead (born 1933), an emeritus professor at Indiana University	JPL · 9143
9144 Hollisjohnson	1955 UN_{1}	Hollis R. Johnson (born 1928), an emeritus professor at Indiana University	JPL · 9144
9145 Shustov	1976 GG_{3}	Boris Mikhailovich Shustov (born 1947), a deputy director at the Institute of Astronomy of the Russian Academy of Sciences	JPL · 9145
9146 Tulikov	1976 YG_{1}	Sergeevich Tulikov (born 1914), a composer and an artist in the U.S.S.R.	JPL · 9146
9147 Kourakuen	1977 DD_{1}	Kourakuen in Okayama is one of the three most outstanding gardens in Japan	JPL · 9147
9148 Boriszaitsev	1977 EL_{1}	Boris Petrovich Zaitsev (1925–2000), People's artist of Ukraine	JPL · 9148
9150 Zavolokin	1978 SE_{1}	Gennadij Dmitrievich Zavolokin (1943–2001), a player of the bayan (Russian accordion)	JPL · 9150
9151 Kettnergriswold	1979 MQ_{8}	Kettner John Frederick Griswold (born 1960) is the "Launch Vehicle Integration Manager" of the Lucy mission.	IAU · 9151
9152 Combe	1980 VZ_{2}	Jean-Philippe Combe (born 1977), a research scientist on the Dawn mission team analyzing the mineralogy of Vesta using visible and near-infrared mapping data	JPL · 9152
9153 Chikurinji	1981 UD_{2}	Chikurinji is the mountain on which the Okayama Astrophysical Observatory is situated.	JPL · 9153
9154 Kolʹtsovo	1982 SP_{6}	Kolʹtsovo, a suburb of Novosibirsk, is the site of the State Scientific Institute of Virology and Biotechnology of the Russian Ministry of Public Health	JPL · 9154
9155 Verkhodanov	1982 SM_{7}	Vyacheslav Gennadievich Verkhodanov (born 1942), a Ukrainian economics and management specialist	JPL · 9155
9156 Malanin	1982 TQ_{2}	Ivan Ivanovich Malanin (1897–1969), Russian accordionist	MPC · 9156
9158 Platè	1984 MR	Nikolaj Alfredovich Platè (born 1934), a chief scientific secretary of the Russian Academy of Sciences and director of the Institute of Petrochemical Synthesis in Moscow	JPL · 9158
9159 McDonnell	1984 UD_{3}	J. A. M. ("Tony") McDonnell (born 1938)	JPL · 9159
9161 Beaufort	1987 BZ_{1}	Rear Admiral Sir Francis Beaufort (1774–1857), an admiral of the British Navy who devised the scale for classifying wind force at sea	JPL · 9161
9162 Kwiila	1987 OA	Kwiila ("Black Oak"), one of the First People in the Luiseno creation story (the black oak is indigenous to Palomar Mountain, the discovery site)	JPL · 9162
9164 Colbert	1987 SQ	Edwin H. Colbert (born 1905), a U.S. vertebrate paleontologist	JPL · 9164
9165 Raup	1987 SJ_{3}	David M. Raup (1933–2015), paleontologist and biological historian at the University of Chicago.	JPL · 9165
9167 Kharkiv	1987 SS_{17}	Kharkiv (Kharkov)	JPL · 9167
9168 Sarov	1987 ST_{17}	Sarov, a small town in the Nizhnij Novgorod region of the Russian Federation where the All-Russian Research Institute of Experimental Physics is located	JPL · 9168
9171 Carolyndiane	1989 GD_{5}	Carolyn Diane Young (born 1940)	JPL · 9171
9172 Abhramu	1989 OB	Abhramu, the "cloud-knitter", was the original female elephant who was a supernatural winged being who could change her shape at will, like the clouds that resemble her children. According to Indian legend, Abhramu's tribe lost its wings and magic by mischance.	JPL · 9172
9173 Viola Castello	1989 TZ_{15}	Viola Castello in Piedmont, northern Italy.	IAU · 9173
9175 Graun	1990 OO_{2}	Ken Graun (born 1955)	JPL · 9175
9176 Struchkova	1990 VC_{15}	Raisa Stepanovna Struchkova (born 1925), a Russian ballerina at the Moscow Bolshoi Theatre since 1944	JPL · 9176
9177 Donsaari	1990 YA	Donald G. Saari (born 1940), an American mathematician.	JPL · 9177
9178 Momoyo	1991 DU	Momoyo Urata, the wife of Japanese co-discoverer Takeshi Urata	JPL · 9178
9179 Satchmo	1991 EM_{1}	Louis Armstrong (1901–1971), American jazz musician	JPL · 9179
9180 Samsagan	1991 GQ	Samuel Democritus Druyan Sagan (born 1991), the son of Carl Sagan and Ann Druyan	JPL · 9180
9184 Vasilij	1991 PJ_{3}	Vasilij Rumyantsev (born 1968), a Russian astronomer	JPL · 9184
9186 Fumikotsukimoto	1991 RZ_{1}	Fumiko Tsukimoto (born 1987), a painter and illustrator	JPL · 9186
9187 Walterkröll	1991 RD_{4}	Walter Kröll (born), German physicist (de)	MPC · 9187
9189 Hölderlin	1991 RH_{41}	Friedrich Hölderlin (1770–1843), German poet	JPL · 9189
9190 Masako	1991 VR_{1}	Masako Muramatsu, wife of Japanese co-discoverer Osamu Muramatsu	JPL · 9190
9191 Hokuto	1991 XU	Hokuto-shi is the largest city in Yamanashi-ken in Japan.	JPL · 9191
9193 Geoffreycopland	1992 ED_{1}	Geoffrey Malcolm Copland, British physicist	MPC · 9193
9194 Ananoff	1992 OV_{2}	Alexandre Ananoff (1910–1992) was a Russian-French space expert, author of L´Astronautique (1950) and organizer of the first International Astronautical Congress. In 1950 he was the first recipient of the Hermann Oberth Medal, and he was an advisor on fellow writer Hergé's Adventures of Tintin on the Moon	JPL · 9194
9196 Sukagawa	1992 WP_{5}	Sukagawa, Fukushima, Japan	JPL · 9196
9197 Endo	1992 WH_{8}	Shu Endo (born 1953), one of Japan's leading astrophotographers	JPL · 9197
9198 Sasagamine	1993 BJ_{3}	Sasagamine, mountain in Shikoku, Japan	JPL · 9198

== 9201–9300 ==
back to top

Named minor planet	Provisional	This minor planet was named for...	Ref · Catalog
9203 Myrtus	1993 TM_{16}	Myrtaceae, the myrtle family of aromatic trees and shrubs, with more than 100 genera and nearly 4000 species. This family is typical of the Southern Hemisphere, where the Eucalyptus genus is prevalent. Myrtus communis (common myrtle) is a species native to the Mediterranean and is cultivated as far north as England.	JPL · 9203
9204 Mörike	1994 PZ_{1}	Eduard Mörike (1804–1875), German Romantic poet	JPL · 9204
9205 Eddywally	1994 PO_{9}	Eddy Wally (born 1930), a Flemish singer	JPL · 9205
9206 Yanaikeizo	1994 RQ	Keizo Yanai (born 1941), once of researchers at the Japanese National Institute of Polar Research	JPL · 9206
9207 Petersmith	1994 SF_{12}	Peter H. Smith (born 1947), planetary scientist at the Lunar and Planetary Laboratory	JPL · 9207
9208 Takanotoshi	1994 TX_{2}	Toshiaki Takano (born 1954), an associate professor at Chiba University Graduate School of Science and Technology	JPL · 9208
9211 Neese	1995 SB_{27}	Carol Lynn Neese (born 1958), American astronomer at Planetary Science Institute who worked on the JPL Small-Body Database	MPC · 9211
9212 Kanamaru	1995 UR_{3}	Naomiki Kanamaru (born 1970) is an amateur astronomer.	JPL · 9212
9215 Taiyonoto	1995 UB_{45}	The famous monument Taiyonoto, "Tower of the Sun", is in Suita City	JPL · 9215
9216 Masuzawa	1995 VS	Hitoshi Masuzawa (born 1945), a lecturer and curator of the Gotoh Planetarium and Astronomical Museum in Tokyo	JPL · 9216
9217 Kitagawa	1995 WN	Ryuji Kitagawa (1949–2009) was a professor at Hiroshima University. From his research of clay mineralogy, he clarified the mechanism of weathering of granite and generation of landslide and slope failure.	JPL · 9217
9218 Ishiikazuo	1995 WV_{2}	Kazuo Ishii (born 1950), employed in the past in the manufacture of planetaria, has been working since 2005 as an architectural consultant in the design of astronomical facilities. (Ikeya-Seki)	JPL · 9218
9220 Yoshidayama	1995 XL_{1}	Yoshidayama is a hill located in Sakyo, a district in the northeastern part of Kyoto. It contains temples, shrines, and many maple trees.	JPL · 9220
9221 Wuliangyong	1995 XP_{2}	Wu Liangyong (born 1922) is an architect, city planner, and educator, and the founder of Sciences of Human Settlements in China	JPL · 9221
9222 Chubey	1995 YM	Markiyan S. Chubey (born 1940) is a Ukrainian-born Russian scientist working at the Pulkovo Observatory. He is an astrometrist and is leading a team to develop astrometry and astrophysics at the sun-earth L4 and L5 points using the stereo principle	JPL · 9222
9223 Leifandersson	1995 YY_{7}	Leif Erland Andersson (1943–1979) observed that most satellites of the outer planets rotate synchronously about their parent planets, helped determine Pluto's pole position and albedo map, and determined that Pluto and its satellite Charon would display mutual transits and eclipses. He also made a catalogue of lunar craters.	JPL · 9223
9224 Železný	1996 AE	Jan Železný, Czech javelin thrower	MPC · 9224
9225 Daiki	1996 AU	Daiki Matsubayashi (born 1961) has been a member of the Saga Astronomical Society since the time of its establishment in 1981.	JPL · 9225
9226 Arimahiroshi	1996 AB_{1}	Hiroshi Arima (born 1958) is a registered architect who also designs individual observatories in Japan. While a university student he was a leader of the Kyushu Meteoric Network. With members of the Kumamoto Civil Astronomical Observatory, he helped carry out a solar eclipse observation in Mexico in 1991	JPL · 9226
9227 Ashida	1996 BO_{2}	Masafumi Ashida (born 1957)	JPL · 9227
9228 Nakahiroshi	1996 CG_{1}	Japanese amateur astronomer Hiroshi Nakanishi (born 1936)	JPL · 9228
9229 Matsuda	1996 DJ_{1}	Junichi Matsuda (born 1948), a professor at Osaka University	JPL · 9229
9230 Yasuda	1996 YY_{2}	Satoshi Yasuda (born 1948), a member of Amateur Radio on the International Space Station-Japan and a professor at Hitotsubashi University	JPL · 9230
9231 Shimaken	1997 BB_{2}	Shimaken is the research group led by Toshihiko Shimamoto (born 1946), a professor emeritus of Kyoto University. The group reproduced seismogenic fault motion in the laboratory and found that the fault motion itself dramatically weakens the fault by frictional heating and promotes generation of large earthquakes	JPL · 9231
9232 Miretti	1997 BG_{8}	Manlio Miretti (1928–1996) Opera singer	JPL · 9232
9233 Itagijun	1997 CC_{1}	Jun Itagi (born 1958), an amateur astronomical educator famous in the San-In district (Tottori and Shimane prefectures), has served as general-affairs director of the San-In Society of Astronomy.	JPL · 9233
9234 Matsumototaku	1997 CH_{4}	Takuya Matsumoto (born 1966) is a high-school teacher and amateur astronomer who has also been director of the 100-member headquarters of the San-In Society of Astronomy since 1990	JPL · 9234
9235 Shimanamikaido	1997 CT_{21}	Nishiseto Expressway	MPC · 9235
9236 Obermair	1997 EV_{32}	Erwin Obermair (1946–2017), Austrian amateur astronomer and discoverer of minor planets	MPC · 9236
9238 Yavapai	1997 HO_{2}	Yavapai, the county in Arizona of which Prescott is the county seat	JPL · 9238
9239 van Riebeeck	1997 JP_{15}	Jan van Riebeeck (1619–1677), Dutch merchant and founder of the Cape Colony in South Africa	MPC · 9239
9240 Nassau	1997 KR_{3}	Jason John Nassau (1893–1965), a director of the Warner and Swasey Observatory and professor at Case Institute of Technology during 1924–1959	JPL · 9240
9241 Rosfranklin	1997 PE_{6}	Rosalind Franklin (1920–1958), an English chemist	JPL · 9241
9242 Olea	1998 CS_{3}	Oleaceae, the olive family, with about 25 genera and nearly 1000 species. Genera include ash, lilac, jasmine and forsythia. Olea europea (common olive) is profitable as a fruit and source of oil	JPL · 9242
9243 Alag	1998 FF_{68}	Ayush Alag (b. 2001) was a finalist in the 2019 Regeneron Science Talent Search (STS), a science competition for high school seniors, for his computational biology and bioinformatics project. He attended the Harker School, San Jose, California.	IAU · 9243
9244 Višnjan	1998 HV_{7}	Višnjan	JPL · 9244
9246 Niemeyer	1998 HB_{149}	Oscar Niemeyer (born 1907), the chief architect in Brazil	JPL · 9246
9248 Sauer	4593 P-L	Carl G. Sauer Jr., a principal flight mechanics engineer at NASA's Jet Propulsion Laboratory	JPL · 9248
9249 Yen	4606 P-L	Chen-wan L. Yen, a senior analyst within the Mission and Systems Architecture Section of NASA's Jet Propulsion Laboratory.	JPL · 9249
9250 Chamberlin	4643 P-L	Alan B. Chamberlin, a senior engineer within the Navigation and Flight Mechanics Section of NASA's Jet Propulsion Laboratory	JPL · 9250
9251 Harch	4896 P-L	Ann P. Harch, the Cornell University scientist	JPL · 9251
9252 Goddard	9058 P-L	Robert H. Goddard (1882–1945), American rocketry pioneer	JPL · 9252
9253 Oberth	1171 T-1	Hermann Oberth (1894–1989), Romanian-born German rocketry pioneer	MPC · 9253
9254 Shunkai	2151 T-1	Shibukawa Shunkai (1639–1715), an expert on the calendar	JPL · 9254
9255 Inoutadataka	3174 T-1	Inou Tadataka (1745–1818), a Japan geographer and surveyor	JPL · 9255
9256 Tsukamoto	1324 T-2	Tsukamoto Akitake (1833–1885), a geographer who worked for both the Tokugawa and Meiji governments	JPL · 9256
9257 Kunisuke	1552 T-2	Kunisuke Kinoshita (1901–1931), an astronomer at the Tokyo Astronomical Observatory from 1924 to his death	JPL · 9257
9258 Johnpauljones	2137 T-2	John Paul Jones (1747–1792), American Revolutionary War naval hero	JPL · 9258
9259 Janvanparadijs	2189 T-2	Jan van Paradijs (1946–1999), Dutch astronomer and astrophysicist	MPC · 9259
9260 Edwardolson	1953 TA_{1}	Edward C. Olson (born 1930), an emeritus professor at the University of Illinois	JPL · 9260
9261 Peggythomson	1953 TD_{1}	Peggy Y. Thomson (born 1927)	JPL · 9261
9262 Bordovitsyna	1973 RF	Tatiana Valentinovna Bordovitsyna (born 1940), head of the department of celestial mechanics and astrometry in the Institute for Applied Mathematics and Mechanics of Tomsk University	JPL · 9262
9263 Khariton	1976 SX_{5}	Yulij Borisovich Khariton (born 1904), a physicist and member of the Russian Academy of Sciences	JPL · 9263
9265 Ekman	1978 RC_{9}	Swedish encyclopaedists Agnita Ekman (born 1945) and Arne Ekman (born 1945)	MPC · 9265
9266 Holger	1978 RD_{10}	Holger Pedersen (born 1946), Danish astronomer at ESO	MPC · 9266
9267 Lokrume	1978 RL_{10}	The church in the parish of Lokrume on Gotland island in Sweden	MPC · 9267
9268 Jeremihschneider	1978 VZ_{2}	Jeremih Paul Schneider (born 1981) was responsible for the electrical power subsystem of the Lucy space probe. Lucy's potent photovoltaic array allows it to travel at a greater distance from the Sun than any previous spacecraft did.	IAU · 9268
9269 Peterolufemi	1978 VW_{6}	Peter Ajiboye Olufemi (born 1960) is the "Chief Safety and Mission Assurance Officer" of the Lucy spacecraft.	IAU · 9269
9270 Sherryjennings	1978 VO_{8}	Sherry Ann Jennings (born 1962) is the Mission Manager of the Lucy spacecraft at NASA's "Planetary Missions Program" office.	IAU · 9270
9271 Trimble	1978 VT_{8}	Virginia Louise Trimble (born 1943)	JPL · 9271
9272 Liseleje	1979 KQ	Liseleje, Zealand, Denmark	JPL · 9272
9273 Schloerb	1979 QW_{3}	Frederick Peter Schloerb (born 1952), American astronomer	MPC · 9273
9274 Amylovell	1980 FF_{3}	Amy Jean Lovell (born 1969), American astronomer	MPC · 9274
9275 Persson	1980 FS_{3}	Jöran Persson (c. 1530–1568), prosecutor and counsellor to King Eric XIV of Sweden	MPC · 9275
9276 Timgrove	1980 RB_{8}	Timothy L. Grove (born 1949), a professor of geology at the Massachusetts Institute of Technology	JPL · 9276
9277 Togashi	1980 TT_{3}	Tom Togashi (1937–2000)	JPL · 9277
9278 Matera	1981 EM_{1}	Matera, Italian city renowned for its historic Sassi districts	IAU · 9278
9279 Seager	1981 EY_{12}	Sara Seager (born 1971), a Canadian-American astronomer and planetary scientist. She is a professor of physics and planetary science at the Massachusetts Institute of Technology.	JPL · 9279
9280 Stevenjoy	1981 EQ_{14}	Steven P. Joy (born 1960), the Dawn mission science manager at the University of California Los Angeles	JPL · 9280
9281 Weryk	1981 EJ_{15}	Robert J. Weryk (born 1981), a researcher at Mount Allison University in Sackville, New Brunswick	JPL · 9281
9282 Lucylim	1981 EP_{16}	Lucy F. Lim (born 1977), a planetary scientist at the Goddard Space Flight Center	JPL · 9282
9283 Martinelvis	1981 EY_{17}	Martin S. Elvis (born 1951), an astrophysicist and expert on quasars at the Harvard-Smithsonian Center for Astrophysics	JPL · 9283
9284 Juansanchez	1981 ED_{24}	Juan Andres Sanchez (born 1979), a postdoctoral research fellow at the Max-Planck Institute for Solar System Research in Katlenburg-Lindau	JPL · 9284
9285 Le Corre	1981 EL_{24}	Lucille Le Corre (born 1983), an associate researcher at the Planetary Science Institute in Tucson, Arizona	JPL · 9285
9286 Patricktaylor	1981 ED_{35}	Patrick Alan Taylor (born 1981), a research scientist at the Arecibo Observatory studying near-Earth asteroids	JPL · 9286
9287 Klima	1981 ER_{43}	Rachel L. Klima (born 1974), a planetary geologist at the Johns Hopkins University Applied Physics Laboratory	JPL · 9287
9288 Santos-Sanz	1981 EV_{46}	Pablo Santos-Sanz (born 1971), a postdoctoral researcher at the "Instituto Astrofisica Andalucia" in Granada	JPL · 9288
9289 Balau	1981 QR_{3}	The Balau area, near Costigliole d´Asti (Piedmont, Italy)	JPL · 9289
9291 Alanburdick	1982 QO	Alan Burdick (born 1965).	JPL · 9291
9293 Kamogata	1982 XQ_{1}	With the neighboring town of Yakage, the town of Kamogata borders the Okayama Astrophysical Observatory, National Astronomical Observatory of Japan	JPL · 9293
9295 Donaldyoung	1983 RT_{1}	Donald L. Young (born 1935)	JPL · 9295
9297 Marchuk	1984 MP	Gurij Ivanovich Marchuk (born 1925), a director of the Institute of Numerical Mathematics of the Russian Academy of Sciences	JPL · 9297
9298 Geake	1985 JM	John E. Geake (1925–1998), astronomer and lunar scientist at UMIST, known for his laboratory interpretation of the optical polarization of the lunar and asteroidal surfaces. He invented the first direct-reading linear refractometer, one of which he designed for the Cassini-Huygens Titan probe.	JPL · 9298
9299 Vinceteri	1985 JG_{2}	Vince (born 1959) and Teri (born 1960) Grout are true friends to two-legged and four-legged animals	JPL · 9299
9300 Johannes	1985 PS	Johannes Andersen (born 1943)	JPL · 9300

== 9301–9400 ==
back to top

Named minor planet	Provisional	This minor planet was named for...	Ref · Catalog
9305 Hazard	1986 TR_{1}	Cyril Hazard (1928–2025), a British radio astronomer.	JPL · 9305
9306 Pittosporum	1987 CG	Pittosporaceae, the Australian laurel family, with nine genera and more than 200 species, mainly in tropical Africa and Pacific islands. Among the species is Pittosporum eugenioides (lemonwood).	JPL · 9306
9307 Regiomontanus	1987 QS	Johannes Regiomontanus (1436–1476), a German mathematician and astronomer.	JPL · 9307
9308 Randyrose	1987 SD_{4}	Randy Rose (born 1963), an electrical engineer and currently leader of the Radio Astronomy and Radar Group at Goldstone.	JPL · 9308
9309 Platanus	1987 SS_{9}	Platanaceae, the plane family, with one genus and seven species. They grow wild mainly in the United States and Mexico, but they are also typical of southern France. Platanus acerifolia (London plane) reaches a height of almost 30 m and is widely planted in cities because of its resistance to air pollution. The brown, bristly fruits, hanging two to four together on a single stalk, persist over the winter.	JPL · 9309
9313 Protea	1988 CH_{3}	Proteaceae, the firebush family, with some 75 genera and over 1000 species. They are native to the Southern Hemisphere, where they grow wild. Some species, such as Protea mellifera (honeyflower), extend also to the warm regions of the Northern Hemisphere. The family is best known for its ornamental plants, such as Embothrium coccineum (Chilean firebush), which are cultivated for their edible nuts.	JPL · 9313
9315 Weigel	1988 PP_{2}	Erhard Weigel (1625–1699), a German mathematician and astronomer.	JPL · 9315
9316 Rhamnus	1988 PX_{2}	Rhamnaceae, the buckthorn family of deciduous and evergreen trees, shrubs and climbing plants, with 60 genera and around 900 species. They grow wild in all parts of the world. Some of the species yield dyes. The berrylike fruits appear in dense clusters. Rhamnus purshina (bearwood) produces a dry bark (cascara sagrada) that is used as a laxative.	JPL · 9316
9319 Hartzell	1988 RV_{11}	Christine M. Hartzell (born 1988), an assistant professor in aerospace engineering at the University of Maryland.	JPL · 9319
9321 Alexkonopliv	1989 AK	Alex Konopliv (born 1960), a principal scientist at the Jet Propulsion Laboratory.	JPL · 9321
9322 Lindenau	1989 AC_{7}	Bernhard von Lindenau (1779–1854), a German scientist	JPL · 9322
9323 Hirohisasato	1989 CV_{1}	Hirohisa Sato (born 1951) studies the orbits and brightness of comets for the Comet Section of the Oriental Astronomical Association.	JPL · 9323
9325 Stonehenge	1989 GG_{4}	Stonehenge	JPL · 9325
9326 Ruta	1989 SP_{2}	Rutaceae, the rue family, with over 150 genera and 1500 species, including citrus fruits. Ruta graviolens (common rue) is a perennial herb with a particularly strong scent. The family thrives in tropical and warm, temperate regions.	JPL · 9326
9327 Duerbeck	1989 SW_{2}	Hilmar Duerbeck, a German astronomer.	JPL · 9327
9329 Nikolaimedtner	1990 EO	Nikolai Karlovich Medtner, Russian composer.	JPL · 9329
9331 Fannyhensel	1990 QM_{9}	Fanny Hensel (1805–1847), the sister of Felix Mendelssohn-Bartholdy and wife of painter Wilhelm Hensel.	JPL · 9331
9333 Hiraimasa	1990 TK_{3}	Masanori Hirai (born 1943), a professor at Fukuoka University of Education.	JPL · 9333
9334 Moesta	1990 UU_{3}	Carl Wilhelm Moesta (1825–1884), a German mathematician and astronomer, who observed stars, planets, comets and solar eclipses. From 1852 to 1867 he was the first director of the National Observatory in Santiago de Chile.	JPL · 9334
9336 Altenburg	1991 AY_{2}	The town of Altenburg	JPL · 9336
9339 Kimnovak	1991 GT_{5}	Kim Novak (born 1933)	JPL · 9339
9340 Williamholden	1991 LW_{1}	William Holden (1918–1981)	JPL MPC · 9340
9341 Gracekelly	1991 PH_{2}	Grace Kelly, American actress, later Her Serene Highness Princess Grace of Monaco.	JPL · 9341
9342 Carygrant	1991 PJ_{7}	Cary Grant (Archibald Leach, 1904–1986), British-American actor.	JPL · 9342
9344 Klopstock	1991 RB_{4}	Friedrich Gottlieb Klopstock, a German poet.	JPL · 9344
9346 Fernandel	1991 RN_{11}	Fernandel (Fernand Joseph Désié Contandin) (1903–1971), French actor.	JPL · 9346
9349 Lucas	1991 SX	François Édouard Anatole Lucas (1842–1891), a French number theorist.	JPL · 9349
9350 Waseda	1991 TH_{2}	Waseda University	JPL · 9350
9351 Neumayer	1991 TH_{6}	Georg von Neumayer (1826–1909), a German geophysicist and hydrographer.	JPL · 9351
9356 Elineke	1991 YV	Eline Deneweth (born 1970), named after Eline Vere, a novel by the Dutch author Louis Couperus, is the niece of the discoverer.	JPL · 9356
9357 Venezuela	1992 AT_{3}	The Republica Bolivariana de Venezuela ("Little Venice") was named in 1499 by Amerigo Vespucci because of the resemblance between the natives' houses, built on water, and the situation in Venice.	JPL · 9357
9358 Fårö	1992 DN_{7}	Fårö island, northernmost socken on Gotland island, Sweden † Archived 2007-06-24 at the Wayback Machine	MPC · 9358
9359 Fleringe	1992 ED_{11}	Fleringe, socken on Gotland island, Sweden † Archived 2007-06-24 at the Wayback Machine	MPC · 9359
9362 Miyajima	1992 FE_{1}	Kazuhiko Miyajima (born 1946), a professor at Doshisha University.	JPL · 9362
9364 Clusius	1992 HZ_{3}	Carolus Clusius (Charles de l'Escluse; 1526–1609), a Flemish botanist.	JPL · 9364
9365 Chinesewilson	1992 RU_{3}	Ernest Henry "Chinese" Wilson, a prolific hunter of plants.	JPL · 9365
9368 Esashi	1993 BS_{3}	Esashi, a small town in northern Hokkaido, on the Sea of Okhotsk.	JPL · 9368
9372 Vamlingbo	1993 FK_{37}	Vamlingbo, socken on Gotland island, Sweden † Archived 2007-06-24 at the Wayback Machine	MPC · 9372
9373 Hamra	1993 FY_{43}	Hamra, socken on Gotland island, Sweden † Archived 2007-06-24 at the Wayback Machine	MPC · 9373
9374 Sundre	1993 FJ_{46}	Sundre, southernmost socken on Gotland island, Sweden † Archived 2007-06-24 at the Wayback Machine	MPC · 9374
9375 Omodaka	1993 HK	Toshihiro Omodaka (born 1947) is a professor of radio astronomy at Kagoshima University.	JPL · 9375
9376 Thionville	1993 OU_{7}	Thionville, the French city in northeastern France, near the Luxembourg border.	JPL · 9376
9377 Metz	1993 PJ_{7}	Metz, the French city in the Lorraine region of France, at the confluence of the Moselle and Seille rivers.	JPL · 9377
9378 Nancy-Lorraine	1993 QF_{3}	Nancy-Lorraine, the French city Nancy, in the Lorraine region of France, near the left bank of the river Meuse.	JPL · 9378
9379 Dijon	1993 QH_{3}	Dijon, the capital of Co\te d´Or, in east-central France.	JPL · 9379
9380 Mâcon	1993 QZ_{5}	Mâcon, the French city in the Bourgogne, on the right side of the river Saône.	JPL · 9380
9381 Lyon	1993 RT_{19}	Lyon, the French city, capital of the Rhône departement in east-central France.	JPL · 9381
9382 Mihonoseki	1993 TK_{11}	Mihonoseki, a small town and port in northeastern Shimane Prefecture.	JPL · 9382
9383 Montélimar	1993 TP_{15}	Montélimar, the city in southeastern France, near the confluence of the Roubion and Rhône rivers.	JPL · 9383
9384 Aransio	1993 TP_{26}	Aransio, the city of Orange in southeastern France in the department of Vaucluse.	JPL · 9384
9385 Avignon	1993 TJ_{30}	Avignon, the city in southeastern France, at the east bank of the Rhône river.	JPL · 9385
9386 Hitomi	1993 XD_{1}	Hitomi Doi (born 1955), wife of Takao Doi, the first Japanese space walker.	JPL · 9386
9387 Tweedledee	1994 CA	Tweedledee and Tweedledum, from Alice in Wonderland.	JPL · 9387
9388 Takeno	1994 EH_{2}	Hyoichiro Takeno (1910–2000) and his son Setsuo Takeno (born 1936) were both professors of Hiroshima University. The former was a theoretical physicist and contributed much on the theory of spherically symmetric space-time. The latter was an experimental mineralogist and proved the stability relations of many sulfide minerals	JPL · 9388
9389 Condillac	1994 ET_{6}	Étienne Bonnot de Condillac, French philosopher	MPC · 9389
9391 Slee	1994 PH_{1}	Bruce Slee (born 1924), one of the pioneers of radio astronomy.	JPL · 9391
9392 Cavaillon	1994 PK_{7}	Cavaillon, a small city on the road from Avignon to Digne in southern France.	JPL · 9392
9393 Apta	1994 PT_{14}	French town of Apt, Vaucluse	MPC · 9393
9394 Manosque	1994 PV_{16}	Manosque, a small city in southern France (Provence).	JPL · 9394
9395 Saint Michel	1994 PC_{39}	Saint Michel l´Observatoire is a small village only 2 km away from the Observatory of Haute Provence.	JPL · 9395
9396 Yamaneakisato	1994 QT	Akisato Yamane (born 1949)	JPL · 9396
9397 Lombardi	1994 RJ	Giuseppe Lombardi (born 1939) is an Italian amateur astronomer at the CCAF observatory in Farra d´Isonzo.	JPL · 9397
9398 Bidelman	1994 SH_{3}	William P. Bidelman, a director of the Warner and Swasey Observatory during 1970–1975 and professor of astronomy at Case Western Reserve University (formerly Case Institute of Technology) during 1970–1986.	JPL · 9398
9399 Pesch	1994 ST_{12}	Peter Pesch, director of the Warner and Swasey Observatory during 1975–1994 and professor of astronomy at Case Western Reserve University during 1961–1997.	JPL · 9399

== 9401–9500 ==
back to top

Named minor planet	Provisional	This minor planet was named for...	Ref · Catalog
9403 Sanduleak	1994 UJ_{11}	Nicholas Sanduleak, American (of Romanian descent) astronomer	MPC · 9403
9405 Johnratje	1994 WQ_{1}	Since 1993, John R. Ratje (born 1946) has been the assistant director and site manager of Mt. Graham International Observatory, a division of Steward Observatory. Before joining Steward Observatory in 1984, he was an oil-company engineer and manager.	JPL · 9405
9407 Kimuranaoto	1994 WS_{3}	Naoto Kimura (born 1956), lecturer and curator at the Gotoh Planetarium and Astronomical Museum in Tokyo.	JPL · 9407
9408 Haseakira	1995 BC	Akira Hase, professor emeritus at Hiroshima University.	JPL · 9408
9409 Kanpuzan	1995 BG_{1}	Kanpuzan, a 1763-m-high mountain to the west side of Mt. Sasagamine in the Shikoku range.	JPL · 9409
9411 Hitomiyamoto	1995 CF	Hitomi Miyamoto, a scientist at the Japan Meteorological Agency.	JPL · 9411
9413 Eichendorff	1995 SQ_{54}	Joseph Freiherr von Eichendorff (1788–1857), a Silesian poet.	JPL · 9413
9414 Masamimurakami	1995 UV_{4}	Masami Murakami (born 1948), observer with the Oriental Astronomical Association's Mars section since 1988	JPL · 9414
9415 Yujiokimura	1995 VE	Yuji Okimura (born 1932), Hiroshima University professor emeritus, is a paleontologist and biostratigrapher of the Late Paleozoic smaller foraminifera.	JPL · 9415
9416 Miyahara	1995 WS	Kenji Miyahara (1937–2011) clarified the occurrence mechanism of geological disasters in the regions of weathered granite in southwest Japan.	JPL · 9416
9417 Jujiishii	1995 WU	Juji Ishii (1865–1914), a Japanese doctor.	JPL · 9417
9418 Mayumi	1995 WX_{5}	Mayumi Sato, wife of the discoverer	JPL · 9418
9419 Keikochaki	1995 XS	Keiko Chaki (born 1954), the president of the Sidewalk Astronomy Society in Takatsuki, Osaka, Japan.	JPL · 9419
9420 Dewar	1995 XP_{4}	Sir James Dewar, Scottish chemist and physicist.	JPL · 9420
9421 Violilla	1995 YM_{2}	Violet Lilian Laurie, mother of the discoverer	MPC · 9421
9422 Kuboniwa	1996 AO_{2}	Atsuo Kuboniwa (born 1964)	JPL · 9422
9423 Abt	1996 AT_{7}	Helmut Abt (born 1925), one of the founders of Kitt Peak National Observatory.	JPL · 9423
9424 Hiroshinishiyama	1996 BN	Hiroshi Nishiyama (born 1956)	JPL · 9424
9425 Marconcini	1996 CM_{7}	Massimiliano Marconcini (1955) is an amateur astronomer of the Montelupo group.	JPL · 9425
9426 Aliante	1996 CO_{7}	Italian name for a glider, the silent plane. The Latin root of the name emphasizes the key role of the wings in the absence of an engine.	JPL · 9426
9427 Righini	1996 CV_{7}	Guglielmo Righini (1908–), Italian solar physicist	JPL · 9427
9428 Angelalouise	1996 DW_{2}	Angela Louise Laurie, wife of the discoverer	MPC · 9428
9429 Poreč	1996 EW_{1}	Poreč	JPL · 9429
9430 Erichthonios	1996 HU_{10}	Erichthonius of Athens, the son of Dardanos and the father of Tros.	JPL · 9430
9431 Pytho	1996 PS_{1}	Pytho (Delphi), a rocky Phocian town mentioned in the Catalogue of Ships from Greek mythology. Led by Schedius and Epistrophus, the Phoceans contributed forty ships to the Greek armada during the Trojan War.	IAU · 9431
9432 Iba	1997 CQ	Yasuaki Iba (1894–1957)	JPL · 9432
9434 Bokusen	1997 CJ_{20}	Numajiri Bokusen (1775–1856) was a Japanese educator, geographer and astronomer	JPL · 9434
9435 Odafukashi	1997 CK_{20}	Fukashi Oda (born 1957), a science teacher of Shudo Junior and Senior High School in Hiroshima, Japan.	JPL · 9435
9436 Shudo	1997 EB	Shudo is a private boys' junior and senior high school in Hiroshima, Japan	JPL · 9436
9437 Hironari	1997 EA_{3}	Hironari Yamane (born 1980) has been director of the Kamagari Astronomical Observatory on an island of Kure City, Hiroshima, since 2009. He is an active member of the Japanese Society for Education and Popularization of Astronomy.	JPL · 9437
9438 Satie	1997 EE_{16}	Erik Satie, French composer †	MPC · 9438
9442 Beiligong	1997 GQ_{27}	Beiligong (Beijing Institute of Technology, BIT)	IAU · 9442
9445 Charpentier	1997 JA_{8}	Marc-Antoine Charpentier (1643–1704), a French musician.	JPL · 9445
9446 Cicero	1997 JT_{11}	Marcus Tullius Cicero, Roman statesman	MPC · 9446
9447 Julesbordet	1997 JJ_{18}	Jules Bordet (1874–1961), Nobel laureate in medicine (1919).	JPL · 9447
9448 Donaldavies	1997 LJ_{3}	Donald W. Davies (1925–2000)	JPL · 9448
9449 Petrbondy	1997 VU_{2}	Petr Kalas, alias Bondy (1944–2000), leader of the Prague Scout section Maják ("Lighthouse")	JPL · 9449
9450 Akikoizumo	1998 BT_{1}	Akiko Izumo (born 1962) is a folklorist of astronomy in Japan, who worked at a planetarium at Yokohama Science Center.	IAU · 9450
9452 Rogerpeeters	1998 DY_{33}	Roger Peeters (born 1948), head of the mechanical workshop at the Royal Observatory at Uccle.	JPL · 9452
9453 Mallorca	1998 FO_{1}	Majorca, Spanish island †	MPC · 9453
9454 Ardeishar	1998 FX_{54}	Adam Ardeishar, 2019 Regeneron Science Talent Search finalist for his mathematics project	IAU · 9454
9458 Beaumont	1998 FF_{97}	Carolyn Beaumont, 2019 Regeneron Science Talent Search finalist for her earth and planetary sciences project	IAU · 9458
9459 Gracecai	1998 FW_{113}	Grace Cai, 2019 Regeneron Science Talent Search finalist for her computer science project	IAU · 9459
9460 McGlynn	1998 HS_{30}	Thomas A. McGlynn (born 1956), currently the chief archive scientist for the High Energy Science Archive Research Center at the Goddard Space Flight Center.	JPL · 9460
9461 Cotingkeh	1998 HV_{33}	Lyron Co Ting Keh, 2019 Regeneron Science Talent Search finalist for his computational biology and bioinformatics project	IAU · 9461
9463 Criscione	1998 HW_{38}	Lisa Marie Criscione (born 1998) is a finalist in the 2012 Broadcom MASTERS, a math and science competition for middle-school students, for her physical sciences project.	JPL · 9463
9465 Fergusonsam	1998 HJ_{121}	Samuel Ferguson, 2019 Regeneron Science Talent Search finalist for his engineering project	IAU · 9465
9466 Shishir	1998 KR_{46}	Shishir Hitesh Dholakia (born 1999) is a finalist in the 2012 Broadcom MASTERS, a math and science competition for middle-school students, for his earth and space sciences project.	JPL · 9466
9468 Brewer	1998 LT_{2}	James Brewer, ESO astronomer working on stellar populations and carbon stars.	JPL · 9468
9469 Shashank	1998 MY_{34}	Shashank Hitesh Dholakia (born 1999) is a finalist in the 2012 Broadcom MASTERS, a math and science competition for middle-school students, for his earth and space sciences project.	JPL · 9469
9470 Jussieu	1998 OS_{10}	The French family of botanists: Bernard de Jussieu (1699–1777), Joseph de Jussieu (1704–1779), Antoine-Laurent de Jussieu (1748–1836), and Adrien-Laurent-Henri de Jussieu (1797–1853).	MPC · 9470
9471 Ostend	1998 OU_{13}	Ostend, Belgium	MPC · 9471
9472 Bruges	1998 OD_{14}	Bruges, Belgium	MPC · 9472
9473 Ghent	1998 OO_{14}	Ghent, Belgium †	MPC · 9473
9474 Cassadrury	1998 QK_{15}	Cassa Frances Drury (born 1999) is a finalist in the 2012 Broadcom MASTERS, a math and science competition for middle-school students, for her biochemistry, medicine, health science and microbiology project.	JPL · 9474
9476 Vincenthuang	1998 QQ_{36}	Vincent Huang (b. 2001) was a finalist in the 2019 Regeneron Science Talent Search (STS), a science competition for high school seniors, for his behavioral and social sciences project. He attended the Plano West Senior High School, Plano, Texas.	IAU · 9476
9477 Kefennell	1998 QK_{41}	Katherine Elizabeth Fennell (born 1999) is a finalist in the 2012 Broadcom MASTERS, a math and science competition for middle-school students, for her animal and plant sciences project.	JPL · 9477
9478 Caldeyro	2148 P-L	Roberto Caldeyro-Barcia (1921–1996), Uruguayan physiologist † Archived 2009-11-13 at the Wayback Machine	MPC · 9478
9479 Madresplazamayo	2175 P-L	Asociación Madres de Plaza de Mayo	MPC · 9479
9480 Inti	2553 P-L	the sun god in Inca religion, also called Apu-Punchau, believed to be the ancestor of the Incas. Inti was at the head of the state cult. He was usually represented in human form, his face portrayed as a gold disk from which rays and flames extended. Inti's sister was the moon, Mama-Kilya, who was portrayed as a silver disk with human features.	JPL · 9480
9481 Menchú	2559 P-L	Rigoberta Menchú Tum, Guatemalan 1992 Nobel Peace Prize winner.	JPL · 9481
9482 Rubéndarío	4065 P-L	Rubén Darío (1867–1916), pseudonym of Félix Rubén Garc{í}a Sarmiento, Nicaraguan poet, journalist and diplomat.	JPL · 9482
9483 Chagas	4121 P-L	Carlos Chagas (1879–1934), Brazilian epidemiologist, discoverer of Chagas disease.	JPL · 9483
9484 Wanambi	4590 P-L	Rainbow Snake	JPL · 9484
9485 Uluru	6108 P-L	Uluru, the Australian Aboriginal sacred place, the center or navel of the island continent. It is also known as Ayers Rock.	JPL · 9485
9486 Utemorrah	6130 P-L	Daisy Utemorrah (born 1922), Australian Aboriginal poet	JPL · 9486
9487 Kupe	7633 P-L	Kupe, the legendary sailor and explorer whose discovery of the islands now known as New Zealand led to the coming there of the Maori people around the ninth century	JPL · 9487
9488 Huia	9523 P-L	Huia, extinct bird of New Zealand	MPC · 9488
9489 Tanemahuta	1146 T-1	For Tāne of Maori mythology; also for the particular tree in New Zealand named Tāne Mahuta	MPC · 9489
9490 Gosemeijer	1181 T-1	Henny Gosemeijer (1924–1999), Dutch amateur astronomer, founded the Public Observatory Twente in 1984. He was honored by NASA and awarded the Dutch "van der Bilt" and "Simon Stevin" prizes.	JPL · 9490
9491 Thooft	1205 T-1	Gerardus 't Hooft, Dutch 1999 Nobel physics laureate † ‡ +	MPC · 9491
9492 Veltman	2066 T-1	Martinus J. G. Veltman, Dutch 1999 Nobel physics laureate † ‡	MPC · 9492
9493 Enescu	3100 T-1	George Enescu, Romanian musician	MPC · 9493
9494 Donici	3212 T-1	Nicolae Donici, Romanian astronomer	MPC · 9494
9495 Eminescu	4177 T-1	Mihai Eminescu, Romanian poet	MPC · 9495
9496 Ockels	4260 T-1	Wubbo Ockels, Dutch astronaut † ‡	MPC · 9496
9497 Dwingeloo	1001 T-2	Dwingeloo Radio Observatory †	MPC · 9497
9498 Westerbork	1197 T-2	Westerbork Synthesis Radio Telescope †	MPC · 9498
9499 Excalibur	1269 T-2	Excalibur, the name of the sword of King Arthur.	JPL · 9499
9500 Camelot	1281 T-2	Camelot, the location of the castle of the King Arthur legend.	JPL · 9500

== 9501–9600 ==
back to top

Named minor planet	Provisional	This minor planet was named for...	Ref · Catalog
9501 Ywain	2071 T-2	Owain mab Urien/Sir Ywain, legendary king of Rheged and knight of the Round Table	JPL · 9501
9502 Gaimar	2075 T-2	Gaimar, obscure legendary knight of the Round Table, lover of Morgan le Fay (mentioned in the 13th-century Lancelot und Ginevra)	JPL · 9502
9503 Agrawain	2180 T-2	Agravaine, legendary knight of the Round Table	JPL · 9503
9504 Lionel	2224 T-2	Sir Lionel, legendary knight of the Round Table	JPL · 9504
9505 Lohengrin	4131 T-2	Lohengrin, character from Arthurian legend and star of the eponymous opera	JPL · 9505
9506 Telramund	5200 T-2	Brabantine Count Friedrich (Frederick) von Telramund, character from the opera Lohengrin	JPL · 9506
9507 Gottfried	5447 T-2	Herzog (Duke) Gottfried, character from the opera Lohengrin	JPL · 9507
9508 Titurel	3395 T-3	A Fisher King, legendary guardian of the Holy Grail, father of Amfortas and a character from the opera Parsifal	JPL · 9508
9509 Amfortas	3453 T-3	A Fisher King, legendary guardian of the Holy Grail, son of Titurel and a character from the opera Parsifal	JPL · 9509
9510 Gurnemanz	5022 T-3	Gurnemanz, character from Arthurian legend, and a character from the opera Parsifal	JPL · 9510
9511 Klingsor	5051 T-3	Klingsor, sorcerous character from Arthurian legend, and in the opera Parsifal	JPL · 9511
9512 Feijunlong	1966 CM	Fei Junlong, Chinese taikonaut	JPL · 9512
9514 Deineka	1973 SG_{5}	Aleksandr Aleksandrovich Deineka (1899–1969) was a Russian painter known for his monumental works and panels on the subjects of labor, sport and defense of the motherland.	JPL · 9514
9515 Dubner	1975 RA_{2}	Gloria Dubner, Argentinian astronomer	JPL · 9515
9516 Inasan	1976 YL_{3}	INASAN, the Institute of Astronomy of the Russian Academy of Sciences in Moscow abbreviated as INASAN (Institut Astronomii Akademii Nauk), is a leading astronomical research institution, founded in 1936. Its main fields of research are stellar astrophysics, galaxies, planetary systems, geodynamics, space research, NEAs and space debris.	JPL · 9516
9517 Niehaisheng	1977 VL_{1}	Nie Haisheng (born 1964), Chinese taikonaut	JPL · 9517
9518 Robbynaish	1978 GA	Robby Naish, American windsurfer.	JPL · 9518
9519 Jeffkeck	1978 VK_{3}	Jeffrey David Keck (born 1977) is the "Lead of Avionics development and production" of the Lucy mission.	IAU · 9519
9520 Montydibiasi	1978 VV_{6}	Lamont Di Biasi (born 1941) is the "Lead for Strategic Development" of the Lucy mission.	IAU · 9520
9521 Martinhoffmann	1980 FS_{1}	Martin Hoffmann (born 1949) is a German astronomer who has made observations of variable stars and minor planets, including lightcurve studies and spectroscopic investigations. In recent years he has been much involved with the observations from ODAS, the O.C.A.- DLR Asteroid Survey. The name was suggested by G. Hahn.	JPL · 9521
9522 Schlichting	1981 DS	Hilke E. Schlichting (born 1982), an assistant professor of planetary science at the Massachusetts Institute of Technology.	JPL · 9522
9523 Torino	1981 EE_{1}	Torino (Turin).	JPL · 9523
9524 O'Rourke	1981 EJ_{5}	Laurence O'Rourke (born 1970), a research scientist at the European Space Astronomy Centre in Madrid.	JPL · 9524
9525 Amandasickafoose	1981 EF_{11}	Amanda Sickafoose Gulbis (born 1975), an astronomer at the South African Large Telescope and a discoverer of minor planets. Her research contributions span from theoretical studies of dust properties on small bodies, to stellar occultations of Kuiper Belt objects, to astronomical instrumentation.	JPL · 9525
9526 Billmckinnon	1981 EC_{13}	William B. McKinnon (born 1954), a professor of planetary science at Washington University in St. Louis.	JPL · 9526
9527 Sherrypervan	1981 EH_{23}	Sherry Pervan (born 1964)	IAU · 9527
9528 Küppers	1981 EH_{24}	Michael Küppers (born 1967), a planetary scientist at the European Space Agency.	JPL · 9528
9529 Protopapa	1981 EF_{25}	Silvia Protopapa (born 1981), an assistant research scientist at the University of Maryland.	JPL · 9529
9530 Kelleymichael	1981 EO_{26}	Michael Sean Peterson Kelley (born 1978), an assistant research scientist at the University of Maryland.	JPL · 9530
9531 Jean-Luc	1981 QK	Jean-Luc Margot (born 1969), a scientist at the Arecibo Observatory.	JPL · 9531
9532 Abramenko	1981 RQ_{2}	Aleksandr Nikolaevich Abramenko (born 1921), chief engineer at the Crimean Astrophysical Observatory	MPC · 9532
9533 Aleksejleonov	1981 SA_{7}	Alexei Leonov, Russian cosmonaut.	JPL · 9533
9535 Plitchenko	1981 UO_{11}	Aleksandr Ivanovich Plitchenko (1943–1997), a Russian writer	JPL · 9535
9536 Statler	1981 UR_{27}	Thomas S. Statler (born 1961), a professor of astronomy at Ohio University.	JPL · 9536
9537 Nolan	1982 BM	Michael C. Nolan (born 1963), a scientist at the Arecibo Observatory.	JPL · 9537
9539 Prishvin	1982 UE_{7}	Mikhail Mikhajlovich Prishvin, Russian writer	MPC · 9539
9540 Mikhalkov	1982 UJ_{7}	Sergey Vladimirovich Mikhalkov, Russian writer and poet	MPC · 9540
9541 Magri	1983 CH	Christopher Magri (born 1961), a scientist at the University of Maine at Farmington.	JPL · 9541
9542 Eryan	1983 TU_{1}	Eileen V. Ryan (born 1960), of New Mexico Highlands University	JPL · 9542
9543 Nitra	1983 XN_{1}	Nitra, a historical town in western Slovakia, was the seat of prince Pribina and center of the Nitra principality early in the ninth century.	JPL · 9543
9544 Scottbirney	1984 EL	Scott Birney (Dion Scott Birney) (born 1926), a professor of astronomy at Wellesley College, Massachusetts, from 1968 to 1991.	JPL · 9544
9545 Petrovedomosti	1984 MQ	Sankt-Peterburgskie Vedomosti, oldest Russian newspaper.	JPL · 9545
9548 Fortran	1985 CN	Fortran (Formula Translator), the first widely distributed symbolic programming language for digital computers.	JPL · 9548
9549 Akplatonov	1985 SM_{2}	Aleksandr Konstantinovich Platonov (born 1931), a Russian mathematician and researcher in astrodynamics and robotics at the Keldysh Institute of Applied Mathematics since 1954.	JPL · 9549
9550 Victorblanco	1985 TY_{1}	Victor Manuel Blanco (born 1918), director of the Cerro Tololo Interamerican Observatory from 1967 to 1981.	JPL · 9550
9551 Kazi	1985 UJ	Kazi, legendary Bohemian princess, daughter of Prince Krok and the wife of Bivoj.	JPL · 9551
9553 Colas	1985 UG_{2}	François Colas (born 1959), an expert on modern solar-system astrometry at the Institut de Mécanique.	JPL · 9553
9554 Dumont	1985 XA	Simone Dumont (born 1924), a Meudon mathematician and astronomer.	JPL · 9554
9555 Frejakocha	1986 GC	Freja Koch Augustesen, granddaughter of one of the discoverers	JPL · 9555
9556 Gaywray	1986 GF	Gay Firestone Wray is a contributor to astronomy research through the Firestone postdoctoral fellowship at the Smithsonian Astrophysical Observatory.	JPL · 9556
9560 Anguita	1987 EQ	Claudio Anguita Cáceres (1930–2000), a Chilean astrometrist at the Universidad de Chile, critically helpful during the establishment of the Cerro Tololo Interamerican Observatory, and an IAU Vice President during 1994–2000. The name was suggested by F. Vilas.	JPL · 9560
9561 van Eyck	1987 QT_{1}	Jan van Eyck, Flemish painter.	JPL · 9561
9562 Memling	1987 RG	Hans Memling (1430–1494), a Flemish painter.	JPL · 9562
9563 Kitty	1987 SJ_{1}	Katherine ("Kitty") F. Putnam (born 1916), president of the Springfield, Massachusetts, Television Corporation from 1975 through 1984.	JPL · 9563
9564 Jeffwynn	1987 SG_{3}	Jeffrey C. Wynn	JPL · 9564
9565 Tikhonov	1987 SU_{17}	Andrej Nikolaevich Tikhonov (1906–1993), a Russian mathematician.	JPL · 9565
9566 Rykhlova	1987 SX_{17}	Lidiya Vasil'evna Rykhlova, head of the Space Astrometry Department of the Institute of Astronomy, Russian Academy of Sciences, is a specialist in the astrometry and dynamics of artificial satellites and an expert on Earth rotation.	JPL · 9566
9567 Surgut	1987 US_{4}	Surgut	JPL · 9567
9569 Quintenmatsijs	1988 CL_{2}	Quinten Matsijs (1466–1530), a Flemish painter.	JPL · 9569
9573 Matsumotomas	1988 UC	Masaru Matsumoto (born 1936) lived in the house in Mihonseki, Shimane Prefecture, that was struck by a 6.4-kg meteorite on 1992 Dec. 10.	JPL · 9573
9574 Taku	1988 XB_{5}	Hiroshi Nakamura (1891–1974), a Japanese medical biochemist and researcher of old maps.	JPL · 9574
9576 van der Weyden	1989 CX_{2}	Rogier van der Weyden (1399–1464), a Flemish painter.	JPL · 9576
9577 Gropius	1989 CE_{5}	Walter Gropius, a German architect.	JPL · 9577
9578 Klyazma	1989 GA_{3}	Klyazma river, whose source is north of Moscow, and which is connected by the Oka river with the Volga at Nizhny Novgorod	JPL · 9578
9579 Passchendaele	1989 GO_{4}	Passchendaele is a village in West Flanders, close to Ypres. The village was first mentioned in 844 as Pascandale	JPL · 9579
9580 Tarumi	1989 TB_{11}	Tarumi, a ward of Kobe City where the first discoverer was born and lives.	JPL · 9580
9583 Clerke	1990 HL_{1}	Agnes Mary Clerke (1842–1907) was an Irish astronomer.	IAU · 9583
9584 Louchheim	1990 OL_{4}	Thomas Louchheim (born 1957)	JPL · 9584
9587 Bonpland	1990 UG_{4}	Aimé Bonpland (Aimé Jacques Goujard Bonpland) (1773–1858), a physician.	JPL · 9587
9588 Quesnay	1990 WE_{2}	François Quesnay, a physician.	JPL · 9588
9589 Deridder	1990 WU_{5}	Remi Adolph De Ridder (1843–1930), a professor of law at Ghent University. In 1881 he was appointed by the government to membership in the School Commission and denounced the monopoly of the clergy in the school system.	JPL · 9589
9590 Hyria	1991 DK_{1}	Hyria, from Greek mythology. It was a location mentioned in Homer's Catalogue of Ships related to the Trojan War. In Hyria, the Boetian assembled their contingent to the Greek armada.	IAU · 9590
9592 Clairaut	1991 GK_{4}	Alexis Clairaut (Alexis-Claude Clairaut) (1713–1765), French mathematician who tackled the gravitational three-body problem.	JPL · 9592
9594 Garstang	1991 RG	Roy Henry Garstang (1925–2009) made basic contributions in atomic physics and astronomical spectroscopy. A pioneer in modeling light pollution, he promoted night sky protection. Assistant director of the University of London Observatory (1959–1964), he then joined the faculty of the University of Colorado in Boulder	JPL · 9594
9599 Onotomoko	1991 UP_{2}	Tomoko Ono (born 1968), one of the most active staff members in the Public Relations Center at the National Astronomical Observatory of Japan.	JPL · 9599

== 9601–9700 ==
back to top

Named minor planet	Provisional	This minor planet was named for...	Ref · Catalog
9602 Oya	1991 UU_{3}	Reinosuke Oya (born 1923)	JPL · 9602
9604 Bellevanzuylen	1991 YW	Belle van Zuylen, pseudonym for Isabella Agneta Elisabeth van Tuyll van Serooskerken, 18th-century Dutch writer from the Enlightenment	JPL · 9604
9605 A Coruña	1992 AP_{3}	A Coruña, a coastal city in Galicia, Spain.	JPL · 9605
9609 Ponomarevalya	1992 QL_{2}	Valentina Leonidovna Ponomareva (born 1934), of the Institute of History of Science and Technology, is a specialist on aircraft and spacecraft	JPL · 9609
9610 Vischer	1992 RQ	Peter Vischer the Elder (c. 1460–1529), the greatest German brass-caster master in the Middle Ages.	JPL · 9610
9611 Anouck	1992 RF_{7}	Anouck Vrouwe (born 1978) studied physics at Nijmegen, specializing later in scientific journalism. At Davros (Switzerland), she has been involved with the study of wind velocities in order to derive models for the prediction of avalanches.	JPL · 9611
9612 Belgorod	1992 RT_{7}	Belgorod	JPL · 9612
9614 Cuvier	1993 BQ_{4}	Georges Cuvier (1769–1832), a French zoologist.	JPL · 9614
9615 Hemerijckx	1993 BX_{13}	Frans Hemerijckx (1902–1969), a medical doctor who went in 1929 to Africa and India to fight against leprosy.	JPL · 9615
9617 Grahamchapman	1993 FA_{5}	Graham Chapman, British member of Monty Python †	MPC · 9617
9618 Johncleese	1993 FQ_{8}	John Cleese, British actor and member of Monty Python †	MPC · 9618
9619 Terrygilliam	1993 FS_{9}	Terry Gilliam, British film maker and member of Monty Python †	MPC · 9619
9620 Ericidle	1993 FU_{13}	Eric Idle, British member of Monty Python †	MPC · 9620
9621 Michaelpalin	1993 FT_{26}	Michael Palin, British member of Monty Python †	MPC · 9621
9622 Terryjones	1993 FV_{26}	Terry Jones, British member of Monty Python †	MPC · 9622
9623 Karlsson	1993 FU_{28}	Per Olow Karlsson, Swedish technician at Uppsala Observatory and Kvistabergs Observatorium †	MPC · 9623
9626 Stanley	1993 JF_{1}	John Stanley (1713–1786)	JPL · 9626
9628 Sendaiotsuna	1993 OB_{2}	Sendai Otsunahiki, a 400-year-old tug-of-war festival, held in Satsumasendai City in the evening of the day before the Autumnal Equinox.	JPL · 9628
9629 Servet	1993 PU_{7}	Miguel Serveto y Reves (Michel Servet, 1511–1553), a doctor of medicine and a theologian living in France.	JPL · 9629
9630 Castellion	1993 PW_{7}	Sébastien Castellion (1515–1563), a French humanist	JPL · 9630
9631 Hubertreeves	1993 SL_{6}	Hubert Reeves, a professional astronomer at the French CNRS.	JPL · 9631
9632 Sudo	1993 TK_{3}	Kenichi Sudo (born 1958), a Japanese medical technologist and amateur astronomer.	JPL · 9632
9633 Cotur	1993 UP_{8}	Peter Cotur (born 1944), Belgian scientific journalist	MPC · 9633
9634 Vodice	1993 XB	Antonio Nino Vodice (born 1943) an Italian banking accountant and amateur astronomer, who is a member of the astronomical society at the Farra d'Isonzo Observatory (Circolo Culturale Astronomico di Farra d'Isonzo) responsible for public relations and organizing conferences.	IAU · 9634
9636 Emanuelaspessot	1993 YO	Emanuela Spessot (b. 1959) is the wife of Luciano Bittesini and one of the Farra d'Isonzo amateur astronomers who discovered this minor planet. For many years a staff member in the arbitration panel of Circolo Culturale Astronomico di Farra d'Isonzo, she also taught folk dancing and danced with the Danzerini di Lucinico, visiting many countries.	IAU · 9636
9637 Perryrose	1994 PJ_{2}	Perry J. Rose (born 1966) is a former member of the Palomar Planet Crossing Asteroid Survey and currently lead solar observer on the 18-meter solar tower at Mt. Wilson Observatory.	JPL · 9637
9638 Fuchs	1994 PO_{7}	Leonhard Fuchs (1501–1566), German botanist and physician	MPC · 9638
9639 Scherer	1994 PS_{11}	Marc Scherer (born 1944), Belgian scientist	MPC · 9639
9640 Lippens	1994 PP_{26}	Carlos Lippens (born 1945), Belgian scientist	MPC · 9640
9641 Demazière	1994 PB_{30}	Martine De Mazière (born 1960), Belgian scientist	MPC · 9641
9642 Takatahiro	1994 RU	Hiroyuki Takata (born 1961), a Japanese amateur astronomer and chief editor of the newsletter of the Chiba Science Society.	JPL · 9642
9645 Grünewald	1995 AO_{4}	Matthias Grünewald (c. 1460–1528), German Renaissance painter and watercolor artist	JPL · 9645
9648 Gotouhideo	1995 UB_{9}	Gotou Hideo (born 1951) is a Japanese amateur astronomer who was born in Oogaki, Gifu prefecture. He has coordinated an observatory at Ooto-mura and also designed a 0.25-m reflector there after he graduated from Doshisha University.	JPL · 9648
9649 Junfukue	1995 XG	Jun Fukue (born 1956), professor at Osaka Kyoiku University, works on theoretical studies concerning accretion disks embedded in quasars and black holes.	JPL · 9649
9650 Okadaira	1995 YG	The Okadaira Shell Mound located in Miho village, Ibaraki prefecture, was built on the south coast of Lake Kasumigaura about 7,000 to 3,500 years ago.	JPL · 9650
9651 Arii-SooHoo	1996 AJ	Computer mathematician Vicki Arii-SooHoo (born 1962) became team leader at AMOS in 1997 and is directly responsible for the successes of the AMOS program.	JPL · 9651
9654 Seitennokai	1996 AQ_{2}	Seitennokai, an astronomy club in Japan, which was founded in 1985, with about 20 members.	JPL · 9654
9655 Yaburanger	1996 CH_{1}	Yaburanger is a nickname for Japanese amateur castle researchers in Ibaraki and Chiba prefectures. `Yabu' means bush in Japanese. The Yaburangers explore castles from the Middle Ages, and they wrote the book Castles in Ibaraki.	JPL · 9655
9656 Kurokawahiroki	1996 DK_{1}	Hiroki Kurokawa (b. 1943), Kyoto University professor emeritus, the former director of the Kwasan and Hida observatories.	IAU · 9656
9657 Učka	1996 DG_{2}	Učka, the highest mountain on the Istrian peninsula, which extends into the northern Adriatic sea.	JPL · 9657
9658 Imabari	1996 DD_{3}	Imabari, Japanese city.	MPC · 9658
9660 Brucewillis	1996 FW_{4}	Bruce Willis, American actor.	IAU · 9660
9661 Hohmann	1996 FU_{13}	Walter Hohmann, German civil engineer †	MPC · 9661
9662 Frankhubbard	1996 GS	Frank Hubbard (1920–1976), an American harpsichord maker.	JPL · 9662
9663 Zwin	1996 GC_{18}	Zwin, natural reserve on the Belgian-Dutch coast †	MPC · 9663
9664 Brueghel	1996 HT_{14}	Pieter Brueghel, Flemish painter	MPC · 9664
9665 Inastronoviny	1996 LA	IAN, or Instantní Astronomické Noviny, is a Czech Internet Astronomical Newspaper founded by Jirí Dusek and Rudolf Novák in Brno in 1997.	JPL · 9665
9667 Amastrinc	1997 HC_{16}	Amateur Astronomers, Inc., now at Union County College, Cranford, New Jersey, where it built the William Miller Sperry Observatory	JPL · 9667
9668 Tianyahaijiao	1997 LN	"Tianya Haijiao", which literally means "edge of the sky, rim of the sea", is the name of a famous rocky outcrop of historical significance on the south coast of Hainan Island just to the west of Sanya, the southernmost city in China	JPL · 9668
9669 Symmetria	1997 NC_{3}	Name suggested by the palindromic shape of the numeral 9669, and the fact that each pair of its digits is invariant under a rotation by 180 degrees	JPL · 9669
9670 Magni	1997 NJ_{10}	Gianfranco Magni (born 1943), who joined the Istituto di Astrofisica Spaziale in Rome in 1975. He has worked on the physics of stellar interiors, in particular on the equation of the state of gas at high pressure and temperature. Currently, his main field of interest is the origin of the solar system and of planetary systems in general, with special attention to the structure and evolution of circumstellar disks and the formation of giant planets. Involved also in the study of the origin and structure of comets, he is a team member of the cometary mission Rosetta.	JPL · 9670
9671 Hemera	1997 TU_{9}	Hemera, the primordial Greek goddess of bright day. She is the daughter of the goddess of night Nykta and the god of darkness Erebus. Hemera means "day" in Greek and gives rise to the word "ephemeris".	JPL · 9671
9672 Rosenbergerezek	1997 TA_{10}	Kamila Rosenberger and Tomaš Rezek, friends of the discoverer (Tomaš worked for two years at Ondřejov Observatory); the asteroid was named on the occasion of Tomáš and Kamila's marriage on 19 June 1999 †	MPC · 9672
9673 Kunishimakoto	1997 UC_{25}	For 21 years, Makoto Kunishi (born 1954) was a lecturer and curator at the Gotoh Planetarium and Astronomical Museum in Tokyo.	JPL · 9673
9674 Slovenija	1998 QU_{15}	Slovenia, the European nation and former Yugoslav republic in which the Črni Vrh Observatory is situated. This is the first minor planet credited to Slovenian astronomers.	JPL · 9674
9676 Eijkman	2023 P-L	Christiaan Eijkman, Dutch physician and pathologist, winner of the Nobel Prize for Medicine and Physiology in 1929 (with Hopkins) †	MPC · 9676
9677 Gowlandhopkins	2532 P-L	Frederick Gowland Hopkins, British biochemist, winner of the Nobel Prize for Medicine and Physiology in 1929 (with Eijkman) †	MPC · 9677
9678 van der Meer	2584 P-L	Simon van der Meer, Dutch physicist, winner of the Nobel Prize for Physics in 1994 †	MPC · 9678
9679 Crutzen	2600 P-L	Paul Crutzen, Dutch chemist, winner of the Nobel Prize for Chemistry in 1995 †	MPC · 9679
9680 Molina	3557 P-L	Mario J. Molina (1943–2020), a Mexican physical chemist and co-recipient of the Nobel Prize for Chemistry in 1995, awarded for work in atmospheric chemistry.	JPL · 9680
9681 Sherwoodrowland	4069 P-L	F. Sherwood Rowland (1927–2012), American chemist and co-recipientof the Nobel Prize for Chemistry in 1995, awarded for work in atmospheric chemistry.	JPL · 9681
9682 Gravesande	4073 P-L	Willem Jacob 's Gravesande, Dutch scientist and lawyer †	MPC · 9682
9683 Rambaldo	4099 P-L	Alfred Emile Rambaldo (1879–1911), born on the island of Java, did extensive research on the upper layers of the atmosphere.	JPL · 9683
9684 Olieslagers	4113 P-L	Jan Olieslagers (1883–1942), Belgian aviation pioneer, caused the airport Deurne (Antwerp International Airport) to be built. In 1910 he made the first overland flight between two cities in the Netherlands. His popularity helped to promote aviation there and in Belgium. The name was suggested by W. A. Fröger.	JPL · 9684
9685 Korteweg	4247 P-L	Diederik Korteweg, Dutch mathematician †	MPC · 9685
9686 Keesom	4604 P-L	Willem Hendrik Keesom, Dutch physicist †	MPC · 9686
9687 Uhlenbeck	4614 P-L	George Eugene Uhlenbeck, Dutch-born American physicist †	MPC · 9687
9688 Goudsmit	4665 P-L	Samuel Abraham Goudsmit, Dutch-born American physicist, member of the ALSOS Commission †	MPC · 9688
9689 Freudenthal	4831 P-L	Hans Freudenthal, Dutch mathematician †	MPC · 9689
9690 Houtgast	6039 P-L	Jacob Houtgast (1908–1982), a Dutch solar physicist	JPL · 9690
9691 Zwaan	6053 P-L	Cornelis Zwaan (1928–1999), professor of astrophysics at Utrecht University	JPL · 9691
9692 Kuperus	6354 P-L	Max Kuperus (born 1936), professor of astrophysics at Utrecht University, and a department chairman at the Royal Netherlands Academy of Arts and Sciences, specialized in theoretical magnetohydrodynamics and plasma physics. He wrote one of the first papers on the heating of the solar corona.	JPL · 9692
9693 Bleeker	6547 P-L	Johan Bleeker (J. A. M. Bleeker), Dutch astronomer, Director of the Netherlands Foundation for Space Research †	MPC · 9693
9694 Lycomedes	6581 P-L	Lycomedes, from Greek mythology, was king of Scyros during the Trojan war. At his court Thetis hid her son Achilles, dressed in girl's clothes to save him from the Trojan war. He was found by Odysseus.	JPL · 9694
9695 Johnheise	6583 P-L	John Heise (born 1942), professor of general physics at Utrecht University, specialized in high-energy space physics. In 1975 he discovered and detected sources of galactic x-ray bursts (1975). He was among the discoverers in 1998 of the origin of the cosmic gamma-ray bursts. The name was suggested by C. de Jager.	JPL · 9695
9696 Jaffe	6628 P-L	Walter J. Jaffe (born 1947) is an American astronomer at Leiden Observatory	JPL · 9696
9697 Louwman	1295 T-1	Peter J. K. Louwman (born 1935)	JPL · 9697
9698 Idzerda	2205 T-1	Hanso Henricus Schotanus Steringa Idzerda (1885–1944)	JPL · 9698
9699 Baumhauer	3036 T-1	Albert Gillis von Baumhauer (1891–1939), a Dutch aviation pioneer, invented the tail rotor for helicopters and built the first Dutch helicopter, which took off on 1925 Dec. 17.	JPL · 9699
9700 Paech	3058 T-1	Wolfgang Paech (born 1951) is an electronic engineer on the staff of the Institute of Geodesy at the University of Hannover, where he serves as technical manager of the astronomical station.	JPL · 9700

== 9701–9800 ==
back to top

Named minor planet	Provisional	This minor planet was named for...	Ref · Catalog
9701 Mak	1157 T-2	Arie Mak (born 1914), a Dutch amateur astronomers, active in lunar occultations and solar observations. He developed scientific instrumentation for and joined in the eclipse expeditions of 1959 and 1966. He received the Van der Bilt Prize in 1951.	JPL · 9701
9702 Tomvandijk	2108 T-2	Thomas van Dijk (born 1915), versatile Dutch amateur astronomer, specialized in spectroscopic, nuclear and photographic techniques. He wrote 45 papers, including one in Nature on lunar luminescence and one on radioactivity of a meteorite in the 1953 Liège Colloquium proceedings.	JPL · 9702
9703 Sussenbach	3146 T-2	John Sussenbach (born 1938) is a Dutch amateur astronomer known for his excellent sky photographs. He founded the Dutch Working Group for Sky Photography and received the Van der Bilt Prize. The name was suggested by C. de Jager.	JPL · 9703
9704 Georgebeekman	5469 T-2	George W. E. Beekman (born 1944) is one of the Netherlands' best science writers in the field of astronomy, known for his weekly contributions in the daily paper NRC-Handelsblad. He has been editor-in-chief of the journal Zenit and is still a member of the editorial board of that monthly. The name was suggested by C. de Jager.	JPL · 9704
9705 Drummen	3137 T-3	Mat Drummen (born 1945) has been director of "de Koepel", the Dutch center for dissemination of information on astronomy, space science and meteorology since 1975. He is author of the annual Sterrengids and coeditor of the Dutch popular journal Zenit. The name was suggested by C. de Jager.	JPL · 9705
9706 Bouma	3176 T-3	Reinder J. Bouma (born 1949), one of the best known Dutch amateur astronomers.	JPL · 9706
9707 Petruskoning	3226 T-3	Petrus A. Koning (born 1934) has organized youth astronomy camps. Founder of the Bussloo Public Observatory, he was long a member of the observatory board. In 1995 he received the Van der Bilt Prize for his efforts to promote astronomy in the Dutch province of Gelderland. The name was suggested by W. A. Fröger.	JPL · 9707
9708 Gouka	4140 T-3	Adriaan Jacobus Gouka (1879–1963) and Christiaan A. C. Nell founded NVWS, the Dutch Astronomical and Meteorological Society on 1 September 1901. The name was suggested by H. van Woerden.	JPL · 9708
9709 Chrisnell	5192 T-3	Christiaan A. C. Nell (1875–1960) was cofounder, together with Adriaan J. Gouka, of the Dutch Astronomical and Meteorological Society. With 4000 members, the society continues to flourish on its 100th anniversary. The name was suggested by H. van Woerden.	MPC · 9709
9711 Želetava	1972 PA	Bearing a 13:12:5 Pythagorean relationship to (8964) [Corvus] Corax and (3735) Trebon, (9711) Zeletava is a small Moravian town near the center of the hypotenuse of a similar triangle with short leg centered on Trebon, Bohemia, and long leg running through Vranov (crow, Corvus), Moravia, and Raabs (raven, Corax), Austria.	JPL · 9711
9712 Nauplius	1973 SO_{1}	Nauplius, from Greek mythology, a son of Poseidon and Amymone. He was king of Euboea and father of Palamedes.	JPL · 9712
9713 Oeax	1973 SP_{1}	Oeax, from Greek mythology, is the son of Nauplius of Euboea and brother of Palamedes.	JPL · 9713
9714 Piazzismyth	1975 LF_{1}	Charles Piazzi Smyth (1819–1900) was an Italian-born British astronomer, working on spherical astronomy and geodesy in South Africa, before becoming the 2nd Astronomer Royal for Scotland. He is known for his work on solar spectroscopy and his pyramidological and metrological studies of the Great Pyramid of Giza. The lunar crater Piazzi Smyth (crater) is named after him.	IAU · 9714
9715 Paolotanga	1975 SB_{1}	Paolo Tanga (born 1966), an adjoint astronomer at the Observatoire de la Côte d´Azur.	JPL · 9715
9716 Severina	1975 UE	Severina Feitknecht-Gallati (1945–2000), who hailed from Glarus, the same home town as the discoverer, was a highly esteemed physician at Interlaken.	JPL · 9716
9717 Lyudvasilia	1976 SR_{5}	Lyudmila Vasil'evna Shaposhnikova (born 1926), orientalist and writer.	JPL · 9717
9718 Gerbefremov	1976 YR_{1}	Gerbert Alexandrovich Efremov (born 1933), a Russian designer of space technology, created the Proton rocket and Almaz space stations. He is a member of Tsiolkovsky Russian Academy of Cosmonautics and was decorated with the Leonardo da Vinci Medal of the International Association of Peace Foundations.	JPL · 9718
9719 Yakage	1977 DF_{2}	With the neighboring town of Kamogata, the town of Yakage borders the Okayama Astrophysical Observatory, National Astronomical Observatory of Japan.	JPL · 9719
9720 Ulfbirgitta	1980 FH_{1}	Ulf and Birgitta Heyman, friends of the discoverer †	MPC · 9720
9721 Doty	1980 GB	Arthur G. Doty (1951–1999), an amateur astronomer.	JPL · 9721
9722 Levi-Montalcini	1981 EZ	In 1952 Italian neurologist Rita Levi-Montalcini (1909–2012) discovered the Nerve Growth Factor, the protein responsible for the nervous system cell proliferation. Winner of the 1986 Nobel prize for Medicine, she promoted programs for educating women in developing countries	JPL · 9722
9723 Binyang	1981 EP_{13}	Bin Yang (born 1977), a research fellow at the European Southern Observatory in Chile.	JPL · 9723
9724 Villanueva	1981 EW_{17}	Geronimo L. Villanueva (born 1978), a research assistant professor of physics at Catholic University of America.	JPL · 9724
9725 Wainscoat	1981 EE_{19}	Richard J. Wainscoat (born 1961), an astronomer at the University of Hawaii.	JPL · 9725
9726 Verbiscer	1981 EY_{19}	Anne J. Verbiscer (born 1964), an associate research professor at the University of Virginia.	JPL · 9726
9727 Skrutskie	1981 EW_{24}	Michael F. Skrutskie (born 1959), a professor of astronomy at the University of Virginia.	JPL · 9727
9728 Videen	1981 EX_{38}	Gordon Videen (born 1964), a research scientist with the Space Science Institute of Boulder, Colorado.	JPL · 9728
9732 Juchnovski	1984 SJ_{7}	Ivan Juchnovski (born 1937), president of the Bulgarian Academy of Sciences since 1996.	JPL · 9732
9733 Valtikhonov	1985 SC_{3}	Valentin Fedorovich Tikhonov (1938–2004), Russian astrophysicist and member of the Russian Mission Control Center, took an active part in realization of many deep space missions. He also developed a relativistic theory of the inner planets, as well as new theories of the motions of comet 1P/Halley and the satellites of Mars.	JPL · 9733
9737 Dudarova	1986 SC_{2}	Veronica Borisovna Dudarova (born 1916), the only woman conductor in Russia.	JPL · 9737
9739 Powell	1987 SH_{7}	James Lawrence Powell, director of the Natural History Museum of Los Angeles County, professor of geology at Oberlin College.	JPL · 9739
9741 Solokhin	1987 UU_{4}	Valentin Fedorovich Solokhin (born 1933), the director general of a company in Surgut of the Tyumen province in Siberia.	JPL · 9741
9742 Worpswede	1987 WT_{1}	German town of Worpswede, home of an artistic community of the same name	JPL · 9742
9743 Tohru	1988 GD	Tohru Takahashi (born 1959) is a professor of information optics at the Oita National College of Technology. His research interest includes adaptive optics. As an amateur astronomer, he has led the Astronomical Society of Oita since its foundation. The name was suggested by Y. Yamada.	JPL · 9743
9744 Nielsen	1988 JW	As the physician responsible for the mental and physical fitness of a close-knit team of researchers, construction workers and support staff at the Amundsen-Scott South Pole research station, Jerri Nielsen (born 1952) is noted for her friendship and concern for the "Polies" and her courage to face her own serious illness.	JPL · 9744
9745 Shinkenwada	1988 VY	Shinken Wada, Japanese NHK announcer.	JPL · 9745
9746 Kazukoichikawa	1988 VS_{1}	Kazuko Ichikawa, Japanese teddy-bear artist	MPC · 9746
9748 van Ostaijen	1989 CS_{2}	Paul van Ostaijen (1896–1928), Flemish poet who influenced Belgian and Dutch poetry.	MPC · 9748
9749 Van den Eijnde	1989 GC_{1}	Peter Van den Eijnde (born 1966) has academic degrees in German philology and management and has always been active in astronomy. During the 1980s he helped the discoverer with the reduction of astrometric work. He is now park manager of the Antwerp Zoo.	JPL · 9749
9751 Kadota	1990 QM	Ken-ichi Kadota (born 1961), a computer engineer and renowned amateur astronomer in Ageo, Saitama prefecture.	JPL · 9751
9756 Ezaki	1991 CC_{3}	Yusuke Ezaki (born 1957), a CCD astrometric observer in Toyonaka, Osaka prefecture.	JPL · 9756
9757 Felixdejager	1991 GA_{6}	Felix de Jager (born 1999) is the second grandson of the discoverer and son of Sigyn and Philip de Jager-Elst. The fourth generation of professional musicians, Felix shows great love and ability for musical performance.	JPL · 9757
9758 Dainty	1991 GZ_{9}	John Christopher Dainty (born 1947), British optical physicist and professor of optics at Imperial College, London.	MPC · 9758
9761 Krautter	1991 RR_{4}	Joachim Krautter (1948-2026) was associate director of the Heidelberg Königstuhl Observatory and a well-known expert on pre-main-sequence stars and novae. He was also engaged in European astronomical organizations and serves as president of the Astronomische Gesellschaft (2002–2005).	JPL · 9761
9762 Hermannhesse	1991 RA_{5}	Hermann Hesse, German writer	MPC · 9762
9764 Morgenstern	1991 UE_{5}	Christian Morgenstern, German poet, writer and translator	MPC · 9764
9766 Bradbury	1992 DZ_{2}	Ray Douglas Bradbury (born 1920), the critically acclaimed science fiction author whose works include The Martian Chronicles and The Illustrated Man.	JPL · 9766
9767 Midsomer Norton	1992 EB_{1}	Midsomer Norton, English town	MPC · 9767
9768 Stephenmaran	1992 GB_{1}	Stephen P. Maran (born 1938), American astronomer and veteran of the space program, has made outstanding contributions to public understanding of astronomy as press officer for the American Astronomical Society. He has conducted professional research on many different telescopes and has lectured and written extensively on space discoveries.	JPL · 9768
9769 Nautilus	1993 DG_{2}	Nautilus, submarine in Jules Verne's Twenty Thousand Leagues Under the Seas.	JPL · 9769
9770 Discovery	1993 EE	"Discovery" was the name of the spaceship in Arthur Clarke's novel and Stanley Kubrick's movie 2001: A Space Odyssey. It is also the name of one of NASA's Space Shuttle Discovery.	JPL · 9770
9774 Annjudge	1993 NO	Ann Campana Judge (1951–2001), the travel office manager for the National Geographic Society.	JPL · 9774
9775 Joeferguson	1993 OH_{12}	Joe Ferguson (1962–2001), director of the geography education outreach program for the National Geographic Society.	JPL · 9775
9777 Enterprise	1994 OB	The Starship Enterprise, of Star Trek fame, or the Space Shuttle of the same name.	JPL · 9777
9778 Isabelallende	1994 PA_{19}	Isabel Allende, Chilean writer.	JPL · 9778
9780 Bandersnatch	1994 SB	Bandersnatch, from Lewis Carroll's Jabberwocky.	JPL · 9780
9781 Jubjubbird	1994 UB_{1}	Jubjub bird, from Lewis Carroll's Jabberwocky.	JPL · 9781
9782 Edo	1994 WM	Edo is the former name for Tokyo, the capital and largest city of Japan.	JPL · 9782
9783 Tensho-kan	1994 YD_{1}	Tensho-kan, the first planetarium in Japan, located at the science center in Osaka.	JPL · 9783
9784 Yotsubashi	1994 YJ_{1}	Yotsubashi, in the center of Osaka, is where the astronomers of the Edo period observed eclipses.	JPL · 9784
9785 Senjikan	1994 YX_{1}	Senjikan, an astronomy group in Osaka in the Edo period.	JPL · 9785
9786 Gakutensoku	1995 BB	Gakutensoku, the first Japanese robot, created in 1928 by Makoto Nishimura.	JPL · 9786
9788 Yagami	1995 EQ_{1}	Junko Yagami (born 1958), a renowned singer-songwriter.	JPL · 9788
9790 Deipyrus	1995 OK_{8}	Deipyrus, from Greek mythology. During the Trojan War, he was one of seven captains of sentinels sent to guard the Greek ships. He was later killed by the prophet Helenus, King Priam's son.	IAU · 9790
9791 Kamiyakurai	1995 YD_{1}	Yakuraisan, popularly called Kami Fuji, is a mountain located in the town of Kami in northeastern Japan. People come here to enjoy beautiful seasonal nature, flowers and starry nights.	JPL · 9791
9792 Nonodakesan	1996 BX_{1}	Nonodakesan is a mountain located in the town of Wakuya in northeastern Japan. Konpo-ji Temple, popularly called Nonodake Kannon, was constructed on the summit of Nonodake in the eighth century.	JPL · 9792
9793 Torvalds	1996 BW_{4}	Linus Benedict Torvalds, Finnish developer of Linux.	JPL · 9793
9795 Deprez	1996 GJ_{19}	Brigitte Deprez (born 1939), the wife of Uccle astronomer Jozef Denoyelle, colleague of the discoverer.	JPL · 9795
9796 Robotti	1996 HW	Aurelio Robotti (1913–1994) was a lieutenant in the Italian Air Engineers and later professor in aerospace engineering at the Turin Polytechnic. He began studies on rocket fuel using liquid oxygen and ethanol, and tested the first Italian-built liquid-fuel missile.	JPL · 9796
9797 Raes	1996 HR_{21}	Hugo Raes (born 1929), a Flemish writer.	JPL · 9797
9799 Thronium	1996 RJ	Thronium, near the river Boagrius, was one of the places from which the Locrians joined the Achean forces.	IAU · 9799
9800 Shigetoshi	1997 ES_{2}	Shigetoshi Inoue (born 1961), a Japanese amateur astronomer and a key member of Ota Astronomical Club.	JPL · 9800

== 9801–9900 ==
back to top

Named minor planet	Provisional	This minor planet was named for...	Ref · Catalog
9801 Mikewang	1997 FX_{3}	Tseng-Chen “Mike” Wang (b. 1948) has served as a spacecraft navigator at the Jet Propulsion Laboratory for numerous interplanetary missions, including several asteroid and comet missions.	IAU · 9801
9804 Shrikulkarni	1997 NU	Shrinivas Kulkarni (born 1956) was a co-discoverer of the first millisecond pulsar, the first optical counterpart of a binary pulsar, the first pulsar in a globular cluster, the extragalactic origin of gamma-ray bursts and the first brown dwarf.	JPL · 9804
9807 Rhene	1997 SJ_{4}	Rhene, a nymph from Greek mythology. She was the mother of Medon, one of the Achaean Leaders, who took over Philoctetes' men after the latter was bitten by a snake.	IAU · 9807
9808 Navamijain	1998 QS_{70}	Navami Jain (b. 2001) was a finalist in the 2019 Regeneron Science Talent Search (STS), a science competition for high school seniors, for her biochemistry project. She attended the North Carolina School of Science and Mathematics, Durham, North Carolina.	IAU · 9808
9809 Jimdarwin	1998 RZ_{5}	James L. Darwin (born 1939), instrument maker at Lowell Observatory.	JPL · 9809
9810 Elanfiller	1998 RJ_{65}	Elan Eng Filler (born 1998) is a finalist in the 2012 Broadcom MASTERS, a math and science competition for middle-school students, for her biochemistry, medicine, health science and microbiology project.	JPL · 9810
9811 Cavadore	1998 ST	Cyril Cavadore (born 1969), French electronic engineer and discoverer of minor planets at the European Southern Observatory (Src)	MPC · 9811
9812 Danco	1998 SJ_{144}	Emile Danco (1869–1898), who participated in the Antarctic expedition of Adrien de Gerlache, was responsible for the photography and observation of geomagnetism. He died during the trip, and his body was buried at sea near a newly discovered land, named Dancoland.	JPL · 9812
9813 Rozgaj	1998 TP_{5}	Slavko Rozgaj (1895–1978), director of the Zagreb Observatory, was a prolific author of astronomy books and articles. His best-known book is A Book About Stars.	MPC · 9813
9814 Ivobenko	1998 UU_{18}	Baron Ivo von Benko of Bojnik (1851–1903) was the director of the Pola Observatory. He developed systematic work on the meridian circle and compiled a catalogue of fundamental stars. He is best known for the observation that ruled out the existence of the earth's second moon.	JPL · 9814
9815 Mariakirch	2079 P-L	Maria Margarethe Kirch, née Winkelmann (1670–1720), wife and mother of astronomers, was an astronomer in her own right, observing, computing and publishing calendars, working in Berlin and Danzig. Although the comet of April 1702 was first credited to her husband, she was later acknowledged as the discoverer.	JPL · 9815
9816 von Matt	2643 P-L	Baroness Elisabeth von Matt (Elisabeth Freiin von Matt), Austrian astronomer.	JPL · 9816
9817 Thersander	6540 P-L	Thersander, a son of the Theban Polynices, was wounded by Telephus and later was one of the heroes in the Wooden Horse.	JPL · 9817
9818 Eurymachos	6591 P-L	Eurymachos, one of the heroes hidden in the Wooden Horse.	JPL · 9818
9819 Sangerhausen	2172 T-1	In the vicinity of the German city of Sangerhausen, a remarkable archaeological object was unearthed.	JPL · 9819
9820 Hempel	3064 T-1	Rolf Hempel (born 1956) is a German mathematician and amateur astronomer who determined many high-quality positions of minor planets using a quite unconventional measuring device. His orbit determination software is still in use at the Astronomisches Rechen-Institut. The name was suggested by L. D. Schmadel.	JPL · 9820
9821 Gitakresáková	4033 T-1	Margita Kresáková (née Margita Vozárová), Slovak astronomer, wife of astronomer Ľubor Kresák; Comet Vozárová is also named after her †	MPC · 9821
9822 Hajduková	4114 T-1	Mária Hajduková (born 1934), a Slovak astronomer currently at the Astronomical Institute Comenius University, Bratislava (Modra Observatory), has been active in interplanetary matter research, mainly meteors---multicolor photometry and radiation (dependence of the color index on velocity). She educated a whole generation of astronomers in Slovakia.	JPL · 9822
9823 Annantalová	4271 T-1	Anna Antalová (born 1936) has worked at the Astronomical Institute, Slovak Academy of Sciences, Tatranská Lomnica, since 1958. She made various analyses of solar phenomena and significant contributions to the study of solar flares as well as solar cycle characteristics. The name was suggested by D. Chochol.	JPL · 9823
9824 Marylea	3033 T-2	Mary Lea Shane, née Heger (1897–1983), wife of Lick Observatory director C. Donald Shane.	JPL · 9824
9825 Oetken	1214 T-3	Lore Oetken (born 1929) has made significant contributions to the fields of magnetic stars, polarimetry and spectroscopy, a prominent part of the astronomical research at the Potsdam Observatory. The citation was prepared by A. Schnell.	JPL · 9825
9826 Ehrenfreund	2114 T-3	Pascale Ehrenfreund, Dutch astrobiologist †	MPC · 9826
9828 Antimachos	1973 SS	Antimachos, one of the heroes hidden in the Wooden Horse.	JPL · 9828
9829 Murillo	1973 SJ_{1}	Bartolomé Estéban Murillo (1618–1682) created many religious paintings for churches. The painter from Seville is famous for his genre pictures of children that were poor but happy, and these are imitated even today.	JPL · 9829
9830 Franciswasiak	1978 VE_{11}	Francis C. Wasiak (born 1966) is the "Ground Systems Manager" and "Concept of Operations Lead" of the Lucy mission.	IAU · 9830
9831 Simongreen	1979 QZ	Simon F. Green, British astronomer †	MPC · 9831
9832 Xiaobinwang	1981 EH_{3}	Xiao-bin Wang (born 1966), an astronomer at the Yunnan Observatory, Chinese Academy of Sciences.	JPL · 9832
9833 Rilke	1982 DW_{3}	Rainer Maria Rilke, Austrian poet	MPC · 9833
9834 Kirsanov	1982 TS_{1}	Semen Isaakovich Kirsanov (1906–1972), Russian poet	MPC · 9834
9836 Aarseth	1985 TU	Sverre Aarseth (Årseth), Norwegian astronomer.	JPL · 9836
9837 Jerryhorow	1986 AA_{2}	Jerome Horowitz, father of the discoverer.	JPL · 9837
9838 Falz-Fein	1987 RN_{6}	Baron Eduard Aleksandrovich von Falz-Fein (born 1912) is an outstanding collector of works of art and historical documents, known for his charity. Born in Russia, his uncle Friedrich Falz-Fein was the founder in 1875 of the well-known reserve Askania-Nova in Ukraine.	JPL · 9838
9839 Crabbegat	1988 CT_{2}	Crabbegat is an idyllic road at the border of the Wolvendael park, close to the Royal Observatory at Uccle. The name might refer to "crab", although Uccle is located near neither the sea nor even a stream.	JPL · 9839
9841 Mašek	1988 UT	Martin Mašek (born 1988) is an avid observer of deep-sky objects, variable stars, comets and asteroids.	JPL · 9841
9842 Funakoshi	1989 AS_{1}	Hiromi Funakoshi (born 1961) works in Gifu prefecture's Fujihashi village office. He previously contributed to the spread of astronomy awareness as a researcher at Nishi Mino Observatory and still performs volunteer work there.	JPL · 9842
9843 Braidwood	1989 AL_{3}	Thomas Braidwood (1715–1806), a Scottish teacher of the deaf.	JPL · 9843
9844 Otani	1989 WF_{1}	Toyokazu Otani (born 1928), first lecturer at the Gotoh Planetarium and Astronomical Museum in Tokyo.	JPL · 9844
9845 Okamuraosamu	1990 FM_{1}	Osamu Okamura (born 1954) is a Japanese certified public accountant and an amateur astronomer.	JPL · 9845
9848 Yugra	1990 QX_{17}	Yugra is the historical name, used in Russia in medieval times, of the vast area to the east of the Northern Urals, extending to the river Taz. Inhabited then by the Hanty and Mansi tribes, it is now part of the territory of the Hanty-Mansi autonomous area within the Russian Federation.	JPL · 9848
9850 Ralphcopeland	1990 TM_{5}	Ralph Copeland (1837–1905), an English astronomer and 3rd Astronomer Royal for Scotland, was an observer of comets and discoverer of planetary nebula by means of visual spectroscopy. He also observed the 1874 and 1882 transits of Venus and used the Leviathan of Parsonstown telescope to re-visit the nebulae in the catalogues of Charles Messier and John Herschel, and discovered several NGC objects including the Copeland Septet.	IAU · 9850
9851 Sakamoto	1990 UG_{3}	Makoto Sakamoto, a research fellow of the Nishi-Harima Astronomical Observatory.	JPL · 9851
9852 Gora	1990 YX	Ronald Gora (born 1933), a former American swimmer.	JPL · 9852
9853 l'Épée	1991 AN_{2}	Charles-Michel de l'Épée (1712–1789) was a French philanthropic educator who has become known as the "Father of the Deaf", as he believed that the deaf were capable of acquiring language. He founded the first free public school for the deaf in Paris in 1760.	IAU · 9853
9854 Karlheinz	1991 AC_{3}	Karlheinz Müller (born 1943), a German amateur astronomer and an agricultural clerk by profession. From his youth on, he committed himself to astrophotography and brightness estimates of variable stars. He has directed the Volkssternwarte Drebach since 1969 and oversaw the completion of a Zeiss planetarium and a new main building. He has helped popularize astronomy for people of all ages. Müller created the conditions for observing minor planets in Drebach. This minor planet was numbered with the help of positions observed in Drebach in 1996 and 1998.	JPL · 9854
9855 Thomasdick	1991 CU	Thomas Dick (1774–1857) a Scottish astronomer, science teacher, writer and church minister, known for combining science, religion and philosophy and who had a substantial impact on the American education system.	IAU · 9855
9857 Hecamede	1991 EN	Hecamede, daughter of Arsinoos from Greek mythology. She was held captive by King Nestor.	IAU · 9857
9859 Van Lierde	1991 PE_{5}	Edmond Van Lierde (1888–1964), a brilliant student at the University of Brussels, later professor of mathematics, promoted modern mathematics and introduced this new discipline into Belgium. He was also a splendid pianist and an excellent tennis player.	JPL · 9859
9860 Archaeopteryx	1991 PW_{9}	Archaeopteryx, the early bird that had a dinosaur-like skeleton.	JPL · 9860
9861 Jahreiss	1991 RB_{3}	Hartmut Jahreiß (born 1942), a staff astronomer at the Astronomisches Rechen-Institut.	JPL · 9861
9863 Reichardt	1991 RJ_{7}	Johann Friedrich Reichardt, German composer	MPC · 9863
9865 Akiraohta	1991 TP_{1}	Akira Ohta (1951–2002), an amateur observer of meteors and comets.	JPL · 9865
9866 Kanaimitsuo	1991 TV_{4}	Mitsuo Kanai (born 1946), a lecturer and curator at the Gotoh Planetarium and Astronomical Museum in Tokyo for 15 years. JPL	MPC · 9866
9869 Yadoumaru	1992 CD_{1}	Yasushi Yadoumaru (born 1965), a research fellow at the Misato Observatory.	JPL · 9869
9870 Maehata	1992 DA	Hideko Maehata (née Hideco Hyodo, 1914–1995), born in Hashimoto city, Wakayama Prefecture, won the gold medal for the 200-m breast-stroke event in the 1936 Olympic Games in Berlin. She was the first Japanese female Olympic gold medalist.	JPL · 9870
9871 Jeon	1992 DG_{1}	Jeon San-Woon (born 1928), a historian of Korean astronomy and technology.	JPL · 9871
9872 Solf	1992 DJ_{4}	Josef K. M. Solf (born 1934), professor of astronomy at Heidelberg and Jena, and since 1994 director of the Thüringer Landessternwarte Tautenburg.	JPL · 9872
9873 Freundlich	1992 GH	Erwin Finlay-Freundlich (1885–1964) was a German astronomer at Berlin Observatory and later professor at St. Andrews University in Scotland, who designed the Einstein Tower solar telescope at Potsdam, which was built to support experiments and observations to validate Albert Einstein's relativity theory.	IAU · 9873
9878 Sostero	1994 FQ	Giovanni Sostero, Italian aerospace engineer and amateur astronomer†	MPC · 9878
9879 Mammuthus	1994 PZ_{29}	Mammuthus or woolly mammoth was a kind of elephant, about 4 meters tall, with dense dark hair and an 8-cm-thick layer of fat, protecting the animal from the cold.	JPL · 9879
9880 Stegosaurus	1994 PQ_{31}	Stegosaurus, a large dinosaur, 6 to 9 meters long, with a characteristic double row of large bony plates along the back.	JPL · 9880
9881 Sampson	1994 SE	Ralph Allen Sampson (1866–1939) was an Irish-British astronomer and 5th Astronomer Royal for Scotland, whose research included the color temperature of stars and the theory of the motions of the four Galilean moons. The lunar crater Sampson is named after him.	IAU · 9881
9882 Stallman	1994 SS_{9}	Richard Stallman (born 1953), the founder of the GNU Project and an advocate and developer of free software.	JPL · 9882
9883 Veecas	1994 TU_{1}	The Ventura County Astronomical Society (VCAS) on the occasion of their 50th anniversary. The discoverer of this minor planet, John E. Rogers at Camarillo Observatory (670), is a co-founder of VCAS (Src).	IAU · 9883
9884 Příbram	1994 TN_{3}	Príbram, the town in central Bohemia, was the impact site, on 7 April 1959, of the first photographic detection of a meteorite fall. Analysis of the fireball trajectory by Z. Ceplecha led to the discovery of four meteorites.	JPL · 9884
9885 Linux	1994 TM_{14}	The Linux kernel was created by Linus Torvalds in 1991.	JPL · 9885
9886 Aoyagi	1994 VM_{7}	Fusao Aoyagi (born 1952), the president of astronomical society in the town of Ishikawa, Fukushima prefecture.	JPL · 9886
9887 Ashikaga	1995 AH	The city of Ashikaga in the south of Tochigi prefecture is the birthplace of the discoverer. The city has been well known for its textiles since ancient times.	JPL · 9887
9891 Stephensmith	1995 XN_{1}	Stephen Smith, American publisher of The Shallow Sky Bulletin from 1986 to 2000; the SSB contained cometary ephemerides.	JPL · 9891
9892 Meigetsuki	1995 YN_{3}	Meigetsuki (明月記; The Record of the Clear Moon) a diary written by Japanese poet Fujiwara no Teika (1162–1241), containing astronomical events, such as SN 1054, a supernova explosion from which the Crab Nebula formed.	IAU · 9892
9893 Sagano	1996 AA_{1}	The Sagano district is located in the western part of Kyoto, Japan. It is one of the city's most popular area for sightseeing, known for its bamboo forest and Zen temples. The historic place has been visited by imperial family, aristocrats, and the literati since the 9th century.	IAU · 9893
9897 Malerba	1996 CX_{7}	Franco Malerba (born 1946), the first Italian astronaut.	JPL · 9897
9898 Yoshiro	1996 DF	Yoshiro Yamada (born 1954), a leading popularizer of astronomy in Japan. He worked at the National Astronomical Observatory as a public outreach official, and also at museums in Sagamihara, Yokohama and Tokyo. He translated Don Yeomans' book on near-earth objects into Japanese.	JPL · 9898
9899 Greaves	1996 EH	William Michael Herbert Greaves (1897–1955) was a British astronomer and 6th Astronomer Royal for Scotland known for his work on stellar spectrophotometry and advocacy for the proposed Jodrell Bank Observatory. The lunar crater Greaves is named after him.	IAU · 9899
9900 Llull	1997 LL_{6}	Ramon Llull (1232–1316), a Catalan writer, philosopher, mystic, missionary and man of science, born in Mallorca. Among his more than 265 works and treatises, his Tractatus novus de astronomia, written in Paris around 1297, adheres to the ideas of Ptolemy.	JPL · 9900

== 9901–10000 ==
back to top

Named minor planet	Provisional	This minor planet was named for...	Ref · Catalog
9902 Kirkpatrick	1997 NY	Ralph Kirkpatrick (1911–1984), eminent American harpsichordist, clavichordist, musicologist and teacher.	JPL · 9902
9903 Leonhardt	1997 NA_{1}	Gustav Leonhardt (1928–2012), Dutch clavecinist, organist and musicologist.	MPC · 9903
9904 Mauratombelli	1997 OC_{1}	Maura Tombelli (born 1952), Italian astronomer and discoverer of minor planets	MPC · 9904
9905 Tiziano	4611 P-L	Tiziano Vecellio (Titian; c. 1477 or 1490–1576), a typical Renaissance painter.	JPL · 9905
9906 Tintoretto	6523 P-L	Jacopo Robusti (1518–1594), called Tintoretto, Italian (Venetian) painter.	JPL · 9906
9907 Oileus	6541 P-L	Oileus, the father of Ajax the Little. Next to Achilles, Ajax was the fastest-running Greek hero.	JPL · 9907
9908 Aue	2140 T-1	Hartmann von Aue (born c. 1160–70, died c. 1210–20), a German poet and knight	JPL · 9908
9909 Eschenbach	4355 T-1	Wolfram von Eschenbach (1168–1220) was, with von Aue and Gottfried von Strassburg, one of the greatest poets of medieval times.	JPL · 9909
9910 Vogelweide	3181 T-2	Walther von der Vogelweide (c. 1170–1230), a German lyric poet.	JPL · 9910
9911 Quantz	4129 T-2	Johann Joachim Quantz (1697–1773), a German flutist and composer.	JPL · 9911
9912 Donizetti	2078 T-3	Gaetano Donizetti (1797–1848), Italian composer.	JPL · 9912
9913 Humperdinck	4071 T-3	Engelbert Humperdinck (1854–1921), a German composer.	JPL · 9913
9914 Obukhova	1976 UJ_{4}	Nadezhda Andreevna Obukhova (1886–1961), a Russian singer.	MPC · 9914
9915 Potanin	1977 RD_{2}	Grigorij Nikolaevich Potanin (1835–1920), a Russian geographer, ethnographer and publicist.	JPL · 9915
9916 Kibirev	1978 TR_{2}	Sergej Feodosievich Kibirev (born 1950) is involved in new methods of the processing of information, organizing the production of microelectronics in Novosibirsk. A champion sprinter in his youth, he likes extreme forms of sports. He is also a poet.	JPL · 9916
9917 Keynes	1979 MK	John Maynard Keynes (1883–1946), a British economist whose ideas fundamentally changed the theory and practice of macroeconomics and the economic policies of governments	JPL · 9917
9918 Timtrenkle	1979 MK_{3}	Timothy G. Trenkle (born 1958) is a contributor to the Lucy mission, leading the "Engineering Technology Directorate" at Goddard Space Flight Center.	IAU · 9918
9919 Undset	1979 QF_{1}	Sigrid Undset (1882–1949), a Norwegian author.	JPL · 9919
9920 Bagnulo	1981 EZ_{10}	Stefano Bagnulo (born 1965), an astronomer at the Armagh Observatory and a specialist in polarimetry of early-type stars.	JPL · 9920
9921 Rubincam	1981 EO_{18}	David P. Rubincam (born 1947), an American planetary geodynamicist at the NASA Goddard Space Flight Center.	JPL · 9921
9922 Catcheller	1981 EO_{21}	Endowing the English language with a new term, the 1961 novel Catch-22 by U.S. writer Joseph Heller (1923–1999) epitomized both the problems of a sane person in an insane society and the absurdity of war. The name was suggested by B. G. Marsden.	JPL · 9922
9923 Ronaldthiel	1981 EB_{24}	Ronald L. Thiel (born 1937) is the Division Chief of the Traffic Division for the County of Hawaii. In his capacity as traffic engineer, he has overseen the installation of shielded LED streetlights and other lighting that is designed to minimize impact on the dark night sky over the Mauna Kea Observatories.	JPL · 9923
9924 Corrigan	1981 EM_{24}	Catherine Corrigan (born 1972) is a U.S. meteoriticist at the Smithsonian Institution. Her research includes the mineralogy and origin of asteroids. She classifies and provides access to meteorites from the U.S. Antarctic collection for the international research community.	JPL · 9924
9925 Juliehoskin	1981 EU_{24}	Candace Julie Hoskin (born 1974) is the Collection Manager for meteorites at the Smithsonian Institution. She is responsible for maintaining the collection and providing access to samples for researchers studying the origin and evolution of asteroids.	JPL · 9925
9926 Desch	1981 EU_{41}	Steven Desch (born 1970) is a professor of astronomy at Arizona State University. His work in theoretical astrophysics centers on models of the origin and evolution of asteroids and planets, including chondrule formation, protoplanetary disk evolution, and the origin of short-lived radionuclides. Nier Prize awardee in 2003.	JPL · 9926
9927 Tyutchev	1981 TW_{1}	Fyodor Tyutchev (1803–1873), Russian poet	MPC · 9927
9929 McConnell	1982 DP_{1}	John C McConnell (born 1946), a historian of Astronomy and chairman of the East Antrim Astronomical Society	JPL · 9929
9930 Billburrows	1984 CP	William E. Burrows (born 1937), of New York University, is a top authority on space, national security, spy satellites and spy planes.	JPL · 9930
9931 Herbhauptman	1985 HH	Herbert A. Hauptman (1917–2011), mathematical chemist and Nobelist.	MPC · 9931
9932 Kopylov	1985 QP_{5}	Ivan Mikheevich Kopylov (born 1928), Russian astronomer.	MPC · 9932
9933 Alekseev	1985 SM_{3}	Anatolij Semenovich Alekseev (born 1928), a professor in the department of mathematical geophysics at Novosibirsk University.	JPL · 9933
9934 Caccioppoli	1985 UC	Renato Caccioppoli (1904–1959) and Francesco Caccioppoli (1855–1904). Francesco directed the Naval Institute in Procida, near Napoli, and was a passionate observer of the sky. Renato was an outstanding mathematician who carried out seminal work on linear and nonlinear differential equations. The name was suggested by E. Perozzi.	JPL · 9934
9936 Al-Biruni	1986 PN_{4}	Al-Biruni (973–1050), a Persian anthropologist, mathematician, and astronomer	JPL · 9936
9937 Triceratops	1988 DJ_{2}	Triceratops, dinosaur genus.	JPL · 9937
9938 Kretlow	1988 KA	Mike Kretlow, a longtime friend of the discoverer.	JPL · 9938
9941 Iguanodon	1989 CB_{3}	Iguanodon, dinosaur genus.	JPL · 9941
9943 Bizan	1989 UG_{3}	Mount Bizan is a 277-m-high mountain in Tokushima Prefecture. The name is said to be derived from the mountain's visual similarity to an eyebrow	JPL · 9943
9945 Karinaxavier	1990 KX	Karina Xavier (born 1977) is a citizen of both Brazil and the U.S. but might have chosen to be born in Italy had she been asked; instead she obtained her doctorate in Italian Renaissance literature. A true citizen of the world, she speaks five languages fluently, often all at once, and has a passion for soccer	JPL · 9945
9947 Takaishuji	1990 QB	Shuji Takai (born 1967), a Japanese elementary school teacher and member of the Kuroishi Subaru Association.	JPL · 9947
9949 Brontosaurus	1990 SK_{6}	Brontosaurus, a genus of a large dinosaur (20 m), that lived in the Late Jurassic with many fossils found in the United States.	JPL · 9949
9950 ESA	1990 VB	European Space Agency	JPL · 9950
9951 Tyrannosaurus	1990 VK_{5}	Tyrannosaurus, dinosaur genus.	JPL · 9951
9954 Brachiosaurus	1991 GX_{7}	Brachiosaurus, dinosaur genus.	JPL · 9954
9956 Castellaz	1991 TX_{4}	Peter Castellaz (born 1965), a German physicist.	JPL · 9956
9957 Raffaellosanti	1991 TO_{13}	Raphael (1483–1520), full name Raffaello Sanzio, a famous painter and architect, and one of the masters of the Italian Renaissance.	JPL · 9957
9960 Sekine	1991 VE_{4}	Masumi Sekine (born 1950), the president of astronomical society at Ageo city.	JPL · 9960
9962 Pfau	1991 YL_{1}	Werner Pfau (born 1936), director of the Jena University Observatory from 1990 to 2000 and a former chairman of the Astronomische Gesellschaft.	JPL · 9962
9963 Sandage	1992 AN	Allan Sandage (1926–2010), an American astronomer at Palomar and Mount Wilson observatories.	JPL · 9963
9964 Hideyonoguchi	1992 CF_{1}	Hideo Noguchi (1876–1928), a Japanese bacteriologist	JPL · 9964
9965 GNU	1992 EF_{2}	The GNU Project was created by Richard Stallman in 1983. It enabled computer programmers to trade and improve on each other's ideas freely. Linux and academic computing owe much of their functionality to the firm foundations of GNU software.	JPL · 9965
9967 Awanoyumi	1992 FV_{1}	Yumi Awano (born 1972), the curator of the Okayama Astronomical Museum.	JPL · 9967
9968 Serpe	1992 JS_{2}	Jean Nicolas François Jules Serpe (1914–2001) was the theoretical-physics professor of the discoverer at the University of Liege and was a member of the Académie royale de Belgique	JPL · 9968
9969 Braille	1992 KD	Louis Braille (1809–1852), French cellist and organist, inventor of braille.	JPL · 9969
9971 Ishihara	1993 HS	Takahiro Ishihara (born 1961), president of the Hiroshima Astronomical Society from 1987 to 1997.	JPL · 9971
9972 Minoruoda	1993 KQ	Minoru Oda (1923–2001), a cosmic-ray physicist.	JPL · 9972
9973 Szpilman	1993 NB_{2}	Wladyslaw Szpilman (1912–2000), a Polish pianist who managed to survive in the Warsaw ghetto.	JPL · 9973
9974 Brody	1993 OG_{13}	Adrien Brody, American actor who played Szpilman in the film The Pianist.	JPL · 9974
9975 Takimotokoso	1993 RZ_{1}	Koso Takimoto (born 1965), a Japanese amateur astronomer.	JPL · 9975
9977 Kentakunimoto	1994 AH	Kenta Kunimoto (born 1960), a Japanese neurosurgeon and a specialist in emergency medicine.	JPL · 9977
9981 Kudo	1995 BS_{3}	Takahiro Kudo (born 1961), a Japanese amateur astronomer and a key member of the Ota Astronomical Club.	JPL · 9981
9983 Rickfienberg	1995 DA	Rick Fienberg (born 1956), American editor-in-chief of Sky and Telescope.	JPL · 9983
9984 Gregbryant	1996 HT	Greg Bryant (born 1970), Australian amateur astronomer.Src	MPC · 9984
9985 Akiko	1996 JF	Akiko Yamamoto (born 1963), Japanese amateur astronomer at the Yatsuka Observatory (367)	MPC · 9985
9986 Hirokun	1996 NX	Hiroshi Fukazawa, nicknamed Hirokun, fiancé of Mizuho Urata (1972–2004), daughter of the co-discoverer, Takeshi Urata	JPL · 9986
9987 Peano	1997 OO_{1}	Giuseppe Peano (1858–1932), Italian mathematician	MPC · 9987
9988 Erictemplebell	1997 RX_{6}	Eric Temple Bell (1883–1960), Scottish-American mathematician and author	MPC · 9988
9990 Niiyaeki	1997 SO_{17}	Niiya Station (Niiya Eki) is the name of a train station in Ozu, Ehime (population 46,000), a city in Ehime Prefecture, Japan	JPL · 9990
9991 Anežka	1997 TY_{7}	Anežka Moravcová (born 1924), grandmother of Czech discoverer Zdeněk Moravec	MPC · 9991
9993 Kumamoto	1997 VX_{5}	Kumamoto, the name of both a prefecture and its capital city, on the Japanese island of Kyushu.	JPL · 9993
9994 Grotius	4028 P-L	Hugo Grotius (1583–1645), Dutch jurist and statesman.	MPC · 9994
9995 Alouette	4805 P-L	Alouette 1, Canadian science satellite launched in 1962	MPC · 9995
9996 ANS	9070 P-L	Astronomische Nederlandse Satelliet, Dutch science satellite.	MPC · 9996
9997 COBE	1217 T-1	Cosmic Background Explorer (COBE), science satellite	JPL · 9997
9998 ISO	1293 T-1	Infrared Space Observatory.	JPL · 9998
9999 Wiles	4196 T-2	Andrew Wiles (born 1953), British mathematician	JPL · 9999
10000 Myriostos	1951 SY	Greek word for ten-thousandth	MPC · 10000

back to top

Preceded by 8,001–9,000	Meanings of minor-planet names List of minor planets: 9,001–10,000	Succeeded by 10,001–11,000
