= Vogelweide (disambiguation) =

Vogelweide may refer to:

- Walther von der Vogelweide (c. 1170–c. 1230)
  - 9910 Vogelweide, a main belt asteroid
- Vogelweide (novel), 2013 novel by Uwe Timm
