= Van Ostaijen =

Van Ostaijen may refer to the following:

- Paul van Ostaijen
- Planet 9748 van Ostaijen
