= 9916 Kibirev =

Asteroid

Discovery
- Discovered by: N. Chernykh
- Discovery site: Crimean Astrophysical Obs.
- Discovery date: 3 October 1978

Designations
- Named after: Sergej Kibirev (Russian informatician)
- Alternative designations: 1978 TR_{2} · 1983 VL_{1}
- Minor planet category: main-belt · (outer); Koronis

Orbital characteristics
- Epoch 23 March 2018 (JD 2458200.5)
- Uncertainty parameter 0
- Observation arc: 44.52 yr (16,261 d)
- Aphelion: 3.0950 AU
- Perihelion: 2.6050 AU
- Semi-major axis: 2.8500 AU
- Eccentricity: 0.0860
- Orbital period (sidereal): 4.81 yr (1,757 d)
- Mean anomaly: 83.251°
- Mean motion: 0° 12^{m} 17.28^{s} / day
- Inclination: 1.0178°
- Longitude of ascending node: 288.18°
- Argument of perihelion: 79.224°

Physical characteristics
- Mean diameter: 5.49 km (calculated); 6.201±0.050 km
- Synodic rotation period: 15.171±0.3802 h 15.48±0.250 h
- Geometric albedo: 0.24 (assumed); 0.260±0.034; 0.2898±0.0435
- Spectral type: S (assumed)
- Absolute magnitude (H): 13.0; 13.018±0.002 (R); 13.160±0.170 (R); 13.2; 13.37±0.30; 13.47

9916 Kibirev, provisional designation 1978 TR_{2}, is a Koronian asteroid from the outer regions of the asteroid belt, approximately 6 kilometers (3.7 miles) in diameter. It was discovered on 3 October 1978, by astronomer Nikolai Chernykh at the Crimean Astrophysical Observatory in Nauchnij, on the Crimean peninsula. The likely S-type asteroid has a rotation period of about 15.2 hours and was named after Russian informatician Sergej Kibirev.

== Orbit and classification ==
Orbit of Kibirev (blue) with the inner planets and Jupiter in red

Kibirev is a core member of the Koronis family (605), a very large outer asteroid family with nearly co-planar ecliptical orbits. It orbits the Sun in the outer main-belt at a distance of 2.6–3.1 AU once every 4 years and 10 months (1,757 days; semi-major axis of 2.85 AU). Its orbit has an eccentricity of 0.09 and an inclination of 1° with respect to the ecliptic. The body's observation arc begins with a precovery taken at Palomar Observatory in September 1973, or 5 years prior to its official discovery observation.

== Physical characteristics ==
Kibirev is an assumed S-type asteroid, which is also the Koronis family's overall spectral type.

=== Rotation period ===
In 2014, two rotational lightcurves of Kibirev were obtained from photometric observations in the R-band by astronomers at the Palomar Transient Factory in California. Lightcurve analysis gave a rotation period of 15.171 and 15.48 hours with a brightness amplitude of 0.36 and 0.45 magnitude, respectively (U=2/2).

=== Diameter and albedo ===
According to the survey carried out by the NEOWISE mission of NASA's Wide-field Infrared Survey Explorer, Kibirev measures 6.201 kilometers in diameter and its surface has an albedo between 0.260 and 0.2898.

The Collaborative Asteroid Lightcurve Link assumes an albedo of 0.24 and calculates a diameter of 5.49 kilometers based on an absolute magnitude of 13.47.

== Naming ==
This minor planet was named after Russian Sergej Feodosievich Kibirev (born 1950), who works on new methods to process information and organizes the production of microelectronics in the Russian city of Novosibirsk. The official naming citation was published by the Minor Planet Center on 9 March 2001 (M.P.C. 42359).
