= 9549 Akplatonov =

Asteroid

Discovery
- Discovered by: N. Chernykh; L. Chernykh
- Discovery site: Crimean Astrophysical Obs.
- Discovery date: 19 September 1985

Designations
- Named after: Aleksandr Platonov (computational mathematician)
- Alternative designations: 1985 SM_{2} · 1981 TU_{1} 1987 BP_{3} · 1992 JK_{3}
- Minor planet category: main-belt · (middle) background · Eunomia

Orbital characteristics
- Epoch 27 April 2019 (JD 2458600.5)
- Uncertainty parameter 0
- Observation arc: 37.03 yr (13,526 d)
- Aphelion: 2.8896 AU
- Perihelion: 2.3237 AU
- Semi-major axis: 2.6067 AU
- Eccentricity: 0.1086
- Orbital period (sidereal): 4.21 yr (1,537 d)
- Mean anomaly: 183.99°
- Mean motion: 0° 14^{m} 3.12^{s} / day
- Inclination: 11.154°
- Longitude of ascending node: 235.19°
- Argument of perihelion: 305.61°

Physical characteristics
- Mean diameter: 8.238±0.173 km
- Synodic rotation period: 2.8431±0.0004 h
- Geometric albedo: 0.285
- Spectral type: S (assumed)
- Absolute magnitude (H): 12.40; 12.5

9549 Akplatonov, provisional designation 1985 SM_{2}, is an Eunomia asteroid from the central region of the asteroid belt, approximately 8.2 kilometers (5.1 miles) in diameter. It was discovered on 19 September 1985, by Soviet–Russian astronomer couple Nikolai and Lyudmila Chernykh at the Crimean Astrophysical Observatory in Nauchnyj, on the Crimean peninsula. The likely S-type asteroid has a relatively short rotation period of 2.8 hours. It was named for Russian computational mathematician Aleksandr Platonov.

== Orbit and classification ==
Akplatonov is a core member of the Eunomia family, a large group of stony S-type asteroids and the most prominent family in the intermediate main-belt. Alternatively, in Nesvorný's HCM-analysis, the asteroid belong's to the main belt's background population, while in an earlier such analysis, Thais Mothé-Diniz considered Akplatonov to be the largest body in a small cluster or clump of its own. It orbits the Sun in the central asteroid belt at a distance of 2.3–2.9 AU once every 4 years and 3 months (1,537 days; semi-major axis of 2.61 AU). Its orbit has an eccentricity of 0.11 and an inclination of 11° with respect to the ecliptic. The body's observation arc begins 4 years prior to its official discovery observation, with its first identification as 1981 TU_{1} at the discovering observatory in October 1981.

== Naming ==
This minor planet was named in honor of Aleksandr Konstantinovich Platonov (born 1931), a Russian computational mathematician, roboticist, astrodynamicist, and long-time member at the Keldysh Institute of Applied Mathematics. He pioneered the research in walking robots, the computation of satellite orbits around Earth, and the guidance of the flight path of spacecraft in the Solar System. The official naming citation was published by the Minor Planet Center on 24 June 2002 (M.P.C. 46009).

== Physical characteristics ==
=== Rotation period ===
A rotational lightcurve of Akplatonov was obtained from photometric observations using the 0.9-meter SARA telescope at Kitt Peak National Observatory in May 2009. It showed a rotation period of 2.8431±0.0004 hours with a brightness variation of 0.15 magnitude (U=3-). A poorly rated period determination from a fragmentary lightcurve by astronomers at the Palomar Transient Factory in 2010 gave a period of 4.7 hours (U=1).

=== Diameter and albedo ===
According to the survey carried out by the NEOWISE mission of NASA's space-based Wide-field Infrared Survey Explorer, Akplatonov measures 8.2 kilometers in diameter and its surface has an albedo of 0.285, while the Collaborative Asteroid Lightcurve Link (CALL) assumes an albedo of 0.21 – derived from 15 Eunomia, the family's largest member and namesake – and calculates a diameter of 9.17 kilometers using an absolute magnitude of 12.5.
