= David J. Asher =

British astronomer (born 1966)

Minor planets discovered: 10
9084 Achristou	3 February 1995
10369 Sinden	8 February 1995
12395 Richnelson	8 February 1995
15834 McBride	4 February 1995
16693 Moseley	26 December 1994
22403 Manjitludher	5 June 1995
26891 Johnbutler	7 February 1995
37678 McClure	3 February 1995
42531 McKenna	5 June 1995
58345 Moomintroll	7 February 1995

David J. Asher (born 1966 in Edinburgh) is a British astronomer, who works at the Armagh Observatory (IAU code 981) in Northern Ireland. He studied mathematics at Cambridge and received his doctorate from Oxford. He is known for the meteor research that he conducts with Robert McNaught. In 1999 and 2000, they accurately gauged when the Leonids meteor shower would peak, while underestimating the peak intensities.

The Mars-crosser asteroid 6564 Asher, discovered by Robert McNaught in 1992, was named in his honor.
