= 9909 Eschenbach =

Asteroid

- Orbit of Eschenbach (blue), with the inner planets and Jupiter (outermost)

Discovery
- Discovered by: C. J. van Houten; I. van Houten-G. T. Gehrels
- Discovery site: Palomar Obs.
- Discovery date: 26 March 1971

Designations
- Named after: Wolfram von Eschenbach (medieval knight and poet)
- Alternative designations: 4355 T-1 · 1969 VD_{2} 1994 RW_{4}
- Minor planet category: main-belt · (inner); Flora

Orbital characteristics
- Epoch 4 September 2017 (JD 2458000.5)
- Uncertainty parameter 0
- Observation arc: 47.47 yr (17,337 days)
- Aphelion: 2.7334 AU
- Perihelion: 1.9620 AU
- Semi-major axis: 2.3477 AU
- Eccentricity: 0.1643
- Orbital period (sidereal): 3.60 yr (1,314 days)
- Mean anomaly: 120.54°
- Mean motion: 0° 16^{m} 26.4^{s} / day
- Inclination: 4.3236°
- Longitude of ascending node: 147.17°
- Argument of perihelion: 240.25°

Physical characteristics
- Dimensions: 3.404±0.127 km 23.4 km
- Geometric albedo: 0.460±0.051
- Absolute magnitude (H): 13.8

9909 Eschenbach, provisional designation 4355 T-1, is a Florian asteroid from the inner regions of the asteroid belt, roughly 10 kilometers in diameter.

The asteroid was discovered on 26 March 1971, by Dutch astronomer couple Ingrid and Cornelis van Houten, as well as Dutch–American astronomer Tom Gehrels. The asteroid was spotted during the Palomar–Leiden survey by examining photographic plates taken at Palomar Observatory, California, United States. It was named after medieval knight and poet Wolfram von Eschenbach.

== Orbit and classification ==
Eschenbach is a member of the Flora family. It orbits the Sun in the inner main-belt at a distance of 2.0–2.7 AU once every 3 years and 7 months (1,314 days). Its orbit has an eccentricity of 0.16 and an inclination of 4° with respect to the ecliptic. It was first identified as 1969 VD_{2} at Crimea-Nauchnij in 1969, extending the body's observation arc by 2 years prior to its official discovery observation at Palomar.

== Survey designation ==
The survey designation "T-1" stands for the first Palomar–Leiden Trojan survey, named after the fruitful collaboration of the Palomar and Leiden Observatory in the 1960s and 1970s. Gehrels used Palomar's Samuel Oschin telescope (also known as the 48-inch Schmidt Telescope), and shipped the photographic plates to Ingrid and Cornelis van Houten at Leiden Observatory where astrometry was carried out. The trio are credited with the discovery of several thousand minor planets.

== Physical characteristics ==
=== Diameter and albedo ===
According to the surveys carried out by the Infrared Astronomical Satellite IRAS and NASA's Wide-field Infrared Survey Explorer with its subsequent NEOWISE mission, Eschenbach measures 23.4 and 3.404 kilometers in diameter, respectively. NEOWISE also finds an exceptionally high albedo of 0.460 for the body's surface. It has an absolute magnitude of 13.8

=== Lightcurves ===
As of 2017, the asteroid's rotation period and shape remain unknown.

== Naming ==
This minor planet was named after German medieval knight and poet Wolfram von Eschenbach (1168–1220) one of the greatest poets of his time along with Gottfried von Strassburg and Hartmann von Aue (also see 9908 Aue). Wolfram von Eschenbach is known for his epic Parzival and for two other narrative works: the fragmentary Titurel and the unfinished Willehalm. The official naming citation was published by the Minor Planet Center on 2 April 1999 (M.P.C. 34356).
