= Gaimar =

Gaimar, Guaimar, or Waimar is a Germanic given name that historically could refer to:

- Guaimar I of Salerno
- Guaimar II of Salerno
- Guaimar III of Salerno
- Guaimar IV of Salerno
- Guaimar II of Amalfi
- Geoffrey Gaimar

== See also ==
- Qaymar, an Iraqi dairy product made out of water buffalo milk
