= 9084 Achristou =

Asteroid

Discovery
- Discovered by: D. J. Asher
- Discovery site: Siding Spring Obs.
- Discovery date: 3 February 1995

Designations
- Named after: Apostolos Christou (British astronomer)
- Alternative designations: 1995 CS_{1} · 1980 GV_{1}
- Minor planet category: main-belt · Hungaria

Orbital characteristics
- Epoch 4 September 2017 (JD 2458000.5)
- Uncertainty parameter 0
- Observation arc: 36.64 yr (13,381 days)
- Aphelion: 2.0048 AU
- Perihelion: 1.7145 AU
- Semi-major axis: 1.8597 AU
- Eccentricity: 0.0780
- Orbital period (sidereal): 2.54 yr (926 days)
- Mean anomaly: 206.11°
- Mean motion: 0° 23^{m} 18.96^{s} / day
- Inclination: 23.098°
- Longitude of ascending node: 197.54°
- Argument of perihelion: 72.116°
- Earth MOID: 0.7794 AU

Physical characteristics
- Dimensions: 1.76 km (calculated); 1.916±0.367 km
- Synodic rotation period: 8.84±0.02 h (Note: Stephens (2013): lightcurve plot of (9084) Achristou with a rotation period 8.84±0.02 hours with a brightness amplitude of 0.09 mag. Summary figures at Collaborative Asteroid Lightcurve Link (CALL))
- Geometric albedo: 0.30 (assumed); 0.333±0.078
- Spectral type: E
- Absolute magnitude (H): 15.7 · 15.4 · 16.08±0.28

9084 Achristou (provisional designation 1995 CS_{1}) is a stony Hungaria asteroid from the innermost regions of the asteroid belt, about 1.9 kilometers in diameter. It was discovered by British astronomer David J. Asher at Siding Spring Observatory in New South Wales, Australia, on 3 February 1995. The asteroid was named after British planetary astronomer Apostolos Christou.

== Orbit and classification ==
Achristou is a member of the Hungaria family, which form the innermost dense concentration of asteroids in the Solar System. It orbits the Sun at a distance of 1.7–2.0 AU once every 2 years and 6 months (926 days). Its orbit has an eccentricity of 0.08 and an inclination of 23° with respect to the ecliptic. In April 1980, it was first identified as 1980 GV_{1} at Palomar Observatory, extending the body's observation arc by 15 years prior to its official discovery observation at Siding Spring.

== Physical characteristics ==
Achristou has been characterized as a bright E-type asteroid.

=== Rotation period ===
In May 2013, a rotational lightcurve of Achristou was obtained from photometric observations by American astronomer Robert Stephens at the Center for Solar System Studies (U81) in California. Lightcurve analysis gave a rotation period of 8.84 hours with a low brightness variation of 0.09 magnitude (U=2+).

=== Diameter and albedo ===
Based on the survey carried out by the NEOWISE mission of NASA's space-based Wide-field Infrared Survey Explorer, Achristou measures 1.9 kilometers in diameter and its surface has an albedo of 0.33, while the Collaborative Asteroid Lightcurve Link assumes an albedo of 0.30 and calculates a diameter of 1.8 kilometers with an absolute magnitude of 15.7.

== Naming ==
This minor planet was named after Apostolos Christou (born 1968), planetary astronomer and programmer at the North Irish Armagh Observatory, after which the minor planet 10502 Armaghobs was named. His field or research include minor planets in co-orbit with Venus, designing near-Earth asteroids missions, the dwarf planet 1 Ceres, meteor impacts on Venus, as well as the irregular satellite families of the outer planets. The official naming citation was published by the Minor Planet Center on 23 May 2005 (M.P.C. 54173).
