= 9910 Vogelweide =

Asteroid

- Orbit of Vogelweide, the inner planets and Jupiter (outermost)

Discovery
- Discovered by: C. J. van Houten; I. van Houten-G. T. Gehrels
- Discovery site: Palomar Obs.
- Discovery date: 30 September 1973

Designations
- Named after: Walther von der Vogelweide (German medieval poet)
- Alternative designations: 3181 T-2 · 2115 T-1
- Minor planet category: main-belt · Koronis

Orbital characteristics
- Epoch 4 September 2017 (JD 2458000.5)
- Uncertainty parameter 0
- Observation arc: 45.36 yr (16,567 days)
- Aphelion: 2.9682 AU
- Perihelion: 2.7757 AU
- Semi-major axis: 2.8720 AU
- Eccentricity: 0.0335
- Orbital period (sidereal): 4.87 yr (1,778 days)
- Mean anomaly: 334.14°
- Mean motion: 0° 12^{m} 9^{s} / day
- Inclination: 3.3670°
- Longitude of ascending node: 95.188°
- Argument of perihelion: 304.41°

Physical characteristics
- Dimensions: 4.94 km (calculated); 5.991±0.132 km
- Synodic rotation period: 117.438±2.2900 h (R); 118.905±2.2900 h (S)
- Geometric albedo: 0.196±0.026; 0.24 (assumed)
- Spectral type: S
- Absolute magnitude (H): 13.47±0.29 · 13.5 · 13.7 · 13.797±0.004 (R) · 14.370±0.004 (S)

9910 Vogelweide, provisional designation 3181 T-2, is a stony Koronian asteroid and elongated slow rotator from the outer regions of the asteroid belt, approximately 5 kilometers in diameter. It was discovered during the second Palomar–Leiden trojan survey in 1973, and named after German medieval poet Walther von der Vogelweide.

== Discovery ==
Vogelweide was discovered on 30 September 1973, by the Dutch astronomers Ingrid and Cornelis van Houten, on photographic plates taken by Dutch–American astronomer Tom Gehrels at Palomar Observatory in California, United States.

It was first observed as 2115 T-1 at the discovering Palomar Observatory during the first Trojan survey in March 1971, extending the body's observation arc by more than 2 years prior to its official discovery observation.

=== Trojan survey ===
The survey designation "T-2" stands for the second Palomar–Leiden Trojan survey, named after the fruitful collaboration of the Palomar and Leiden Observatory in the 1960s and 1970s. Gehrels used Palomar's Samuel Oschin telescope (also known as the 48-inch Schmidt Telescope), and shipped the photographic plates to Ingrid and Cornelis van Houten at Leiden Observatory where astrometry was carried out. The trio are credited with the discovery of several thousand minor planets.

== Classification and orbit ==
Vogelweide is a stony asteroid and member of the Koronis family, a group consisting of few hundred known bodies with nearly ecliptical orbits. It orbits the Sun in the outer main-belt at a distance of 2.8–3.0 AU once every 4 years and 10 months (1,778 days). Its orbit has an eccentricity of 0.03 and an inclination of 3° with respect to the ecliptic.

== Physical characteristics ==
=== Slow rotator ===
In September 2012, two rotational lightcurves of Vogelweide were obtained from photometric observations at the Palomar Transient Factory in California. Lightcurve analysis gave a rotation period of 117.438 and 118.905 hours with a brightness variation of 0.74 and 0.67 magnitude in the R and S-band, respectively (U=2/2). Vogelweide is a slow rotator, as most asteroids have spin rates of less than 20 hours. The relatively high brightness amplitude also indicates that the body has a non-spheroidal shape.

=== Diameter and albedo ===
According to the survey carried out by NASA's Wide-field Infrared Survey Explorer with its subsequent NEOWISE mission, Vogelweide measures 5.991 kilometers in diameter and its surface has an albedo of 0.196. The Collaborative Asteroid Lightcurve Link assumes a standard albedo for stony Koronian asteroids of 0.24 and derives a diameter of 4.94 kilometers with an absolute magnitude of 13.7.

== Naming ==
This minor planet was named for Walther von der Vogelweide (c. 1170 – c. 1230) a German minstrel of the 13th century and popular lyric poet of Middle High German. The approved naming citation was published by the Minor Planet Center on 2 April 1999 (M.P.C. 34356).
