= List of named minor planets: T =

This is a partial list of named minor planets, containing all those starting with the letter T, as of 9 November 2026. It is ordered in a case-insensitive, alphabetical manner and contains a total of 1,313 entries. Grey minor planets have no article and redirect to the list of minor planets instead (see List of minor planets § Main index).

== T ==
- 6897 Tabei
- 7717 Tabeisshi
- 84882 Table Mountain
- 721 Tabora
- 17607 Táborsko
- 34030 Tabuchi
- 52345 Tabuchikouichi
- 8006 Tacchini
- 33662 Tacescu
- 5141 Tachibana
- 7028 Tachikawa
- 15797 Tachikoutenkibu
- 3097 Tacitus
- 14917 Taco
- 4374 Tadamori
- 20746 Tadashi
- 2469 Tadjikistan
- 281569 Taea
- 19159 Taenakano
- 164587 Taesch
- 33596 Taesoolee
- 38976 Taeve
- 197856 Tafelmusik
- 715542 Tafforin
- 276163 Tafreshi
- 3997 Taga
- 10555 Tagaharue
- 49497 Tagashiramitsuo
- 18524 Tagatoshihiro
- 7019 Tagayuichan
- 16671 Tago
- 7855 Tagore
- 2739 Taguacipa
- 4497 Taguchi
- 29449 Taharbenjelloun
- 25817 Tahilramani
- 269232 Tahin
- 40227 Tahiti
- 31943 Tahsinelmas
- 6073 Tähtiseuraursa
- 101462 Tahupotiki
- 40409 Taichikato
- 300892 Taichung
- 28945 Taideding
- 4407 Taihaku
- 232233 Taihu
- 68021 Taiki
- 7775 Taiko
- 10364 Tainai
- 187514 Tainan
- 171381 Taipei
- 713133 Taiping
- 6356 Tairov
- 16704 Taisukekaneko
- 29144 Taitokufuji
- 281561 Taitung
- 2169 Taiwan
- 9215 Taiyonoto
- 2514 Taiyuan
- 178150 Taiyuinkwei
- 6274 Taizaburo
- 100033 Taizé
- 11376 Taizomuta
- 85267 Taj Mahal
- 12277 Tajimasatonokai
- 17651 Tajimi
- 23741 Takaaki
- 8204 Takabatake
- 5403 Takachiho
- 8942 Takagi
- 8199 Takagitakeo
- 26886 Takahara
- 5213 Takahashi
- 48807 Takahata
- 17462 Takahisa
- 9947 Takaishuji
- 8907 Takaji
- 14037 Takakikasahara
- 5578 Takakura
- 10831 Takamagahara
- 13224 Takamatsuda
- 8720 Takamizawa
- 55319 Takanashi
- 9041 Takane
- 43926 Takanoatsushi
- 8133 Takanochoei
- 9208 Takanotoshi
- 6104 Takao
- 35286 Takaoakihiro
- 10171 Takaotengu
- 10166 Takarajima
- 20102 Takasago
- 2838 Takase
- 6527 Takashiito
- 6392 Takashimizuno
- 19135 Takashionaka
- 9642 Takatahiro
- 6554 Takatsuguyoshida
- 4508 Takatsuki
- 9128 Takatumuzi
- 7263 Takayamada
- 9080 Takayanagi
- 8294 Takayuki
- 8862 Takayukiota
- 4965 Takeda
- 8487 Takedashin
- 8737 Takehiro
- 7307 Takei
- 30943 Takeisakiyo
- 7776 Takeishi
- 17096 Takemaru
- 43851 Takemasa
- 9388 Takeno
- 2767 Takenouchi
- 19953 Takeo
- 17615 Takeomasaru
- 26808 Takeoroumon
- 35265 Takeosaitou
- 39686 Takeshihara
- 5179 Takeshima
- 6884 Takeshisato
- 8526 Takeuchiyukou
- 8706 Takeyama
- 73936 Takeyamamoto
- 7802 Takiguchi
- 4887 Takihiroi
- 5973 Takimoto
- 17617 Takimotoikuo
- 9975 Takimotokoso
- 7592 Takinemachi
- 23898 Takir
- 6562 Takoyaki
- 9574 Taku
- 4672 Takuboku
- 10449 Takuma
- 17508 Takumadan
- 10617 Takumi
- 13643 Takushi
- 94884 Takuya
- 163153 Takuyaonishi
- 30192 Talarterzian
- 3151 Talbot
- 32621 Talcott
- 33154 Talent
- 25193 Taliagreene
- 172425 Taliajacobi
- 11201 Talich
- 5902 Talima
- 25482 Tallapragada
- 35347 Tallinn
- 25233 Tallman
- 28344 Tallsalt
- 5786 Talos
- 3564 Talthybius
- 300300 TAM
- 1089 Tama
- 6411 Tamaga
- 13207 Tamagawa
- 8432 Tamakasuga
- 31061 Tamao
- 326 Tamara
- 11956 Tamarakate
- 1084 Tamariwa
- 4186 Tamashima
- 114705 Tamayo
- 3417 Tamblyn
- 46824 Tambora
- 4621 Tambov
- 34412 Tamicruz
- 702961 Tamineilson
- 3121 Tamines
- 8195 Tamkin
- 221529 Tamkósirató
- 18872 Tammann
- 3403 Tammy
- 332991 Tammybecker
- 5993 Tammydickinson
- 12602 Tammytam
- 9096 Tamotsu
- 1497 Tampere
- 2052 Tamriko
- 17938 Tamsendrew
- 28686 Tamsenprofit
- 121313 Tamsin
- 24889 Tamurahosinomura
- 5709 Tamyeunleung
- 28963 Tamyiu
- 26227 Tan
- 1641 Tana
- 6738 Tanabe
- 12492 Tanais
- 4387 Tanaka
- 10300 Tanakadate
- 29850 Tanakagyou
- 9032 Tanakami
- 528997 Tanakatakenori
- 11924 Tanakatetuo
- 5193 Tanakawataru
- 10038 Tanaro
- 843293 Tănăselia
- 30332 Tanaytandon
- 5064 Tanchozuru
- 12603 Tanchunghee
- 5088 Tancredi
- 361183 Tandon
- 8866 Tanegashima
- 9489 Tanemahuta
- 772 Tanete
- 12706 Tanezaki
- 26871 Tanezrouft
- 27257 Tang-Quan
- 1595 Tanga
- 218914 Tangauchin
- 278360 Tangdingyuan
- 33810 Tangirala
- 273936 Tangjingchuan
- 2778 Tangshan
- 64295 Tangtisheng
- 138626 Tanguybertrand
- 12545 Taniamurphy
- 18628 Taniasagrati
- 20747 Tanialepivert
- 6932 Tanigawadake
- 8571 Taniguchi
- 88071 Taniguchijiro
- 43857 Tanijinzan
- 10117 Tanikawa
- 22416 Tanimotoyoshi
- 825 Tanina
- 5869 Tanith
- 391947 Tanithlee
- 31963 Tanjamichalik
- 3542 Tanjiazhen
- 26549 Tankanran
- 14843 Tanna
- 13668 Tanner
- 129321 Tannercampbell
- 20117 Tannoakira
- 12411 Tannokayo
- 28419 Tanpitcha
- 2102 Tantalus
- 6142 Tantawi
- 15295 Tante Riek
- 15296 Tantetruus
- 10154 Tanuki
- 2127 Tanya
- 26450 Tanyapetach
- 299777 Tanyastreeter
- 31933 Tanyizhao
- 28512 Tanyuan
- 69971 Tanzi
- 231346 Taofanlin
- 46692 Taormina
- 471325 Taowu
- 210030 Taoyuan
- 12158 Tape
- 1705 Tapio
- 129259 Tapolca
- 293878 Tapping
- 5863 Tara
- 30095 Tarabode
- 6197 Taracho
- 130128 Tarafisher
- 13307 Taralarsen
- 5370 Taranis
- 8798 Tarantino
- 211172 Tarantola
- 335533 Tarasprystavski
- 2995 Taratuta
- 352148 Tarcisiozani
- 808811 Tarczaygyörgy
- 591347 Tarczylajos
- 3325 TARDIS
- 32585 Tardivel
- 6739 Tärendö
- 26748 Targovnik
- 32549 Taricco
- 1360 Tarka
- 3345 Tarkovskij
- 13032 Tarn
- 11119 Taro
- 10158 Taroubou
- 305264 Tarrbéla
- 5058 Tarrega
- 8472 Tarroni
- 6510 Tarry
- 39564 Tarsia
- 4123 Tarsila
- 13672 Tarski
- 8888 Tartaglia
- 21750 Tartakahashi
- 74824 Tarter
- 38250 Tartois
- 35618 Tartu
- 9580 Tarumi
- 56329 Tarxien
- 6873 Tasaka
- 130078 Taschner
- 8999 Tashadunn
- 48799 Tashikuergan
- 21117 Tashimaseizo
- 13930 Tashko
- 6594 Tasman
- 115058 Tassantal
- 34010 Tassiloschwarz
- 12295 Tasso
- 289600 Tastevin
- 1109 Tata
- 2668 Tataria
- 17169 Tatarinov
- 286162 Tatarka
- 6663 Tatebayashi
- 33008 Tatematsu
- 17047 Tateschrock
- 11149 Tateshina
- 14621 Tati
- 3517 Tatianicheva
- 4786 Tatianina
- 4235 Tatishchev
- 769 Tatjana
- 465036 Tatm
- 278141 Tatooine
- 172269 Tator
- 1989 Tatry
- 23896 Tatsuaki
- 12335 Tatsukushi
- 41002 Tatsumi
- 136795 Tatsunokingo
- 2957 Tatsuo
- 20040 Tatsuyamatsuyama
- 21949 Tatulian
- 3748 Tatum
- 12179 Taufiq
- 581 Tauntonia
- 10255 Taunus
- 386056 Tauragė
- 512 Taurinensis
- 814 Tauris
- 2424 Tautenburg
- 135561 Tautvaišienė
- 314040 Tavannes
- 2512 Tavastia
- 12623 Tawaddud
- 23922 Tawadros
- 2603 Taylor
- 34294 Taylordufford
- 25184 Taylorgaines
- 121352 Taylorhale
- 21913 Taylorjones
- 25266 Taylorkinyon
- 28534 Taylorwilson
- 8446 Tazieff
- 2266 Tchaikovsky
- 4440 Tchantchès
- 453 Tea
- 27412 Teague
- 8299 Téaleoni
- 14741 Teamequinox
- 11212 Tebbutt
- 19005 Teckman
- 18858 Tecleveland
- 47069 Tecumseh
- 7326 Tedbunch
- 11202 Teddunham
- 189945 Teddykareta
- 2882 Tedesco
- 21446 Tedflint
- 24918 Tedkooser
- 230728 Tedstryk
- 17061 Tegler
- 88611 Teharonhiawako
- 17407 Teige
- 8305 Teika
- 19700 Teitelbaum
- 583729 Tejfel
- 8731 Tejima
- 40994 Tekaridake
- 604 Tekmessa
- 1749 Telamon
- 5894 Telč
- 7608 Telegramia
- 163819 Teleki
- 15913 Telemachus
- 4246 Telemann
- 5264 Telephus
- 11278 Telesio
- 6019 Telford
- 390743 Telkesmária
- 16522 Tell
- 5006 Teller
- 2717 Tellervo
- 21654 Telmo
- 120098 Telmopievani
- 9506 Telramund
- 322539 Telšiai
- 27224 Telus
- 6432 Temirkanov
- 3808 Tempel
- 288615 Tempesti
- 25920 Templeanne
- 22928 Templehe
- 28141 ten Brummelaar
- 563318 ten Kate
- 155142 Tenagra
- 5017 Tenchi
- 384533 Tenerelli
- 1399 Teneriffa
- 22783 Teng
- 2195 Tengström
- 6302 Tengukogen
- 85293 Tengzhou
- 5018 Tenmu
- 6664 Tennyo
- 2774 Tenojoki
- 4855 Tenpyou
- 9783 Tensho-kan
- 4645 Tentaikojo
- 218752 Tentlingen
- 18399 Tentoumushi
- 6481 Tenzing
- 13365 Tenzinyama
- 308798 Teo
- 65001 Teodorescu
- 293477 Teotihuacan
- 170644 Tepliczky
- 12852 Teply
- 38827 ter Kuile
- 16528 Terakado
- 28004 Terakawa
- 5440 Terao
- 16807 Terasako
- 23246 Terazono
- 12327 Terbrüggen
- 13265 Terbunkley
- 345 Tercidina
- 664136 Tercu
- 4813 Terebizh
- 1189 Terentia
- 19495 Terentyeva
- 28599 Terenzoni
- 11350 Teresa
- 19477 Teresajentz
- 300933 Teresamarion
- 342864 Teresamateo
- 133753 Teresamullen
- 24084 Teresaswiger
- 42295 Teresateng
- 792972 Teresina
- 33525 Teresinha
- 28129 Teresummers
- 66454 Terezabeatriz
- 17608 Terezín
- 478 Tergeste
- 21477 Terikdaly
- 30089 Terikelley
- 31872 Terkán
- 12135 Terlingen
- 44027 Termain
- 5654 Terni
- 10486 Teron
- 81 Terpsichore
- 167010 Terracina
- 2399 Terradas
- 79912 Terrell
- 34325 Terrencevale
- 18800 Terresadodge
- 26291 Terristaples
- 21952 Terry
- 5963 Terryalfriend
- 30200 Terryburch
- 6447 Terrycole
- 26734 Terryfarrell
- 9619 Terrygilliam
- 16695 Terryhandley
- 9622 Terryjones
- 34398 Terryschmidt
- 100077 Tertzakian
- 178383 Teruel
- 11861 Teruhime
- 32288 Terui
- 8419 Terumikazumi
- 5924 Teruo
- 72012 Terute
- 24919 Teruyoshi
- 265380 Terzan
- 199677 Terzani
- 21182 Teshiogawa
- 38674 Těšínsko
- 45638 Teske
- 2244 Tesla
- 352760 Tesorero
- 543914 Tessedik
- 11667 Testa
- 16405 Testudo
- 15374 Teta
- 8598 Tetrix
- 20854 Tetruashvily
- 7439 Tetsufuse
- 8231 Tetsujiyamada
- 8393 Tetsumasakamoto
- 14501 Tetsuokojima
- 17501 Tetsuro
- 4343 Tetsuya
- 110742 Tetuokudo
- 2797 Teucer
- 10661 Teutoburgerwald
- 1044 Teutonia
- 16020 Tevelde
- 12855 Tewksbury
- 35352 Texas
- 3765 Texereau
- 4932 Texstapa
- 30252 Textorisová
- 1980 Tezcatlipoca
- 819712 Tezel
- 3998 Tezuka
- 30070 Thabitpulak
- 95939 Thagnesland
- 1236 Thaïs
- 20301 Thakur
- 6001 Thales
- 23 Thalia
- 22503 Thalpius
- 16481 Thames
- 20748 Thamirissantana
- 88786 Thanadelthur
- 31939 Thananon
- 21956 Thangada
- 11806 Thangjam
- 549676 Thanjavur
- 233486 Thankároly
- 34100 Thapa
- 31618 Tharakan
- 24420 Thasos
- 5408 Thé
- 1625 The NORC
- 526492 Theaket
- 13775 Thébault
- 16212 Theberge
- 49291 Thechills
- 586 Thekla
- 10865 Thelmaruby
- 609755 Thelmazina
- 11091 Thelonious
- 612163 Thelowes
- 24 Themis
- 778 Theobalda
- 440 Theodora
- 74373 Théodoremonod
- 235852 Theogeuens
- 34132 Theoguerin
- 22734 Theojones
- 65583 Theoklymenos
- 5041 Theotes
- 16118 Therberens
- 15918 Thereluzia
- 28665 Theresafultz
- 22784 Theresaoei
- 21004 Thérèsemarjou
- 295 Theresia
- 32532 Thereus
- 44933 Therezallewelyn
- 1545 Thernöe
- 23958 Theronice
- 9817 Thersander
- 11509 Thersilochos
- 1868 Thersites
- 1161 Thessalia
- 4902 Thessandrus
- 4035 Thestor
- 17 Thetis
- 45300 Thewrewk
- 405 Thia
- 23262 Thiagoolson
- 4173 Thicksten
- 1586 Thiele
- 17882 Thielemann
- 164006 Thierry
- 69949 Thierrydemange
- 9376 Thionville
- 10473 Thirouin
- 14937 Thirsk
- 88 Thisbe
- 378721 Thizy
- 4834 Thoas
- 3255 Tholen
- 5492 Thoma
- 1023 Thomana
- 2555 Thomas
- 73687 Thomas Aquinas
- 12998 Thomas-Keprta
- 97336 Thomasafleming
- 245158 Thomasandrews
- 33201 Thomasartiss
- 25176 Thomasaunins
- 20192 Thomasback
- 24328 Thomasburr
- 4830 Thomascooley
- 9855 Thomasdick
- 25190 Thomasgoodin
- 24074 Thomasjohnson
- 31780 Thomaskelley
- 551390 Thomaskeßler
- 10922 Thomaslam
- 33466 Thomaslarson
- 34441 Thomaslee
- 23054 Thomaslynch
- 113219 Thomasmazzi
- 37630 Thomasmore
- 8793 Thomasmüller
- 25617 Thomasnesch
- 69848 Thomaspetit
- 328432 Thomasposch
- 10973 Thomasreiter
- 117386 Thomasschlapkohl
- 26679 Thomassilver
- 58441 Thomastestoni
- 52604 Thomayer
- 23019 Thomgregory
- 11746 Thomjansen
- 25166 Thompson
- 2064 Thomsen
- 26430 Thomwilkason
- 9491 Thooft
- 34746 Thoon
- 299 Thora
- 44597 Thoreau
- 3717 Thorenia
- 12671 Thörnqvist
- 6257 Thorvaldsen
- 5548 Thosharriot
- 20686 Thottumkara
- 13240 Thouvay
- 4098 Thraen
- 3801 Thrasymedes
- 9799 Thronium
- 10137 Thucydides
- 18568 Thuillot
- 279 Thule
- 12379 Thulin
- 16626 Thumper
- 13982 Thunberg
- 11780 Thunder Bay
- 10244 Thüringer Wald
- 934 Thüringia
- 42191 Thurmann
- 219 Thusnelda
- 14792 Thyestes
- 23749 Thygesen
- 17365 Thymbraeus
- 55702 Thymoitos
- 115 Thyra
- 366852 Ti
- 20571 Tiamorrison
- 15083 Tianhuili
- 2209 Tianjin
- 8917 Tianjindaxue
- 85558 Tianjinshida
- 13247 Tianshi
- 239593 Tianwenbang
- 9668 Tianyahaijiao
- 33582 Tiashajoardar
- 22955 Tibees
- 4349 Tibúrcio
- 5757 Tichá
- 47164 Ticino
- 5971 Tickell
- 17106 Tidball
- 8056 Tieck
- 32617 Tiegs
- 3643 Tienchanglin
- 43775 Tiepolo
- 74625 Tieproject
- 2158 Tietjen
- 158472 Tiffanyfinley
- 12988 Tiffanykapler
- 21641 Tiffanyko
- 12087 Tiffanylin
- 30330 Tiffanysun
- 12601 Tiffanyswann
- 753 Tiflis
- 17768 Tigerlily
- 13096 Tigris
- 217398 Tihany
- 6327 Tijn
- 9565 Tikhonov
- 2251 Tikhov
- 21650 Tilgner
- 1229 Tilia
- 3272 Tillandz
- 27087 Tillmannmohr
- 20002 Tillysmith
- 302542 Tilmann
- 12062 Tilmanspohn
- 316042 Tilofranz
- 603 Timandra
- 28992 Timbrothers
- 6621 Timchuk
- 251625 Timconrow
- 27234 Timdodd
- 16124 Timdong
- 75072 Timerskine
- 9276 Timgrove
- 130066 Timhaltigin
- 25960 Timheckman
- 4961 Timherder
- 32519 Timholt
- 6398 Timhunter
- 6082 Timiryazev
- 708722 Timișoara
- 7007 Timjull
- 33933 Timlister
- 7982 Timmartin
- 163119 Timmckay
- 12626 Timmerman
- 29770 Timmpiper
- 24372 Timobauman
- 33516 Timonen
- 13174 Timossi
- 24123 Timothychang
- 22722 Timothycooper
- 84943 Timothylinn
- 28781 Timothylohr
- 166748 Timrayschneider
- 29787 Timrenier
- 3238 Timresovia
- 50718 Timrobertson
- 14797 Timrose
- 9918 Timtrenkle
- 28208 Timtrippel
- 4056 Timwarner
- 188867 Tin Ho
- 1222 Tina
- 26261 Tinafreeman
- 24240 Tinagal
- 23071 Tinaliu
- 10434 Tinbergen
- 1933 Tinchen
- 687 Tinette
- 8679 Tingstäde
- 2886 Tinkaping
- 22830 Tinker
- 16676 Tinne
- 9906 Tintoretto
- 25020 Tinyacheng
- 20896 Tiphene
- 7544 Tipografiyanauka
- 4081 Tippett
- 419435 Tiramisu
- 1400 Tirela
- 4648 Tirion
- 6439 Tirol
- 9009 Tirso
- 267 Tirza
- 20749 Tiscareno
- 48425 Tischendorf
- 129879 Tishasaltzman
- 466 Tisiphone
- 3663 Tisserand
- 13121 Tisza
- 593 Titania
- 238817 Titeuf
- 6998 Tithonus
- 342372 Titia
- 1801 Titicaca
- 1998 Titius
- 1550 Tito
- 110702 Titostagno
- 114987 Tittel
- 12133 Titulaer
- 9508 Titurel
- 58702 Tizianabitossi
- 9905 Tiziano
- 10435 Tjeerd
- 137052 Tjelvar
- 732 Tjilaki
- 3090 Tjossem
- 181249 Tkachenko
- 15651 Tlepolemos
- 29858 Tlomak
- 10012 Tmutarakania
- 23685 Toaldo
- 16157 Toastmasters
- 3935 Toatenmongakkai
- 46596 Tobata
- 10723 Tobiashinse
- 13335 Tobiaswolf
- 13125 Tobolsk
- 19731 Tochigi
- 6049 Toda
- 30925 Todahiroyuki
- 90844 Todai
- 18880 Toddblumberg
- 27265 Toddgonzales
- 12202 Toddgregory
- 798118 Todoque
- 15107 Toepperwein
- 11308 Tofta
- 9277 Togashi
- 23547 Tognelli
- 23649 Tohoku
- 9743 Tohru
- 54610 Toichisakata
- 16497 Toinevermeylen
- 2478 Tokai
- 209791 Tokaj
- 10159 Tokara
- 555468 Tokarczuk
- 5069 Tokeidai
- 14314 Tokigawa
- 37786 Tokikonaruko
- 498 Tokio
- 4488 Tokitada
- 4748 Tokiwagozen
- 7038 Tokorozawa
- 48448 Tokuda
- 7160 Tokunaga
- 19707 Tokunai
- 6383 Tokushima
- 26887 Tokyogiants
- 4288 Tokyotech
- 7947 Toland
- 212998 Tolbachik
- 29650 Toldy
- 24665 Tolerantia
- 42479 Tolik
- 31873 Toliou
- 2675 Tolkien
- 216808 Tolmárgyula
- 2326 Tololo
- 138 Tolosa
- 3357 Tolstikov
- 34874 Tolwani
- 4739 Tomahrens
- 34187 Tomaino
- 11500 Tomaiyowit
- 132329 Tomandert
- 123647 Tomáško
- 14351 Tomaskohout
- 33151 Tomasobelloni
- 20750 Tomášpaulech
- 7767 Tomatic
- 32085 Tomback
- 120191 Tombagg
- 35769 Tombauer
- 1604 Tombaugh
- 1013 Tombecka
- 16878 Tombickler
- 7648 Tomboles
- 10483 Tomburns
- 96268 Tomcarr
- 62503 Tomcave
- 129307 Tomconnors
- 12139 Tomcowling
- 2443 Tomeileen
- 5966 Tomeko
- 20010 Tomfrench
- 59384 Tomgiovannetti
- 4897 Tomhamilton
- 12818 Tomhanks
- 30882 Tomhenning
- 25153 Tomhockey
- 13582 Tominari
- 7186 Tomioka
- 7021 Tomiokamachi
- 2391 Tomita
- 23676 Tomitayoshihiro
- 35141 Tomitayoshikuni
- 8400 Tomizo
- 12919 Tomjohnson
- 10828 Tomjones
- 87954 Tomkaye
- 303909 Tomknops
- 14330 Tomlehrer
- 20323 Tomlindstom
- 10108 Tomlinson
- 4653 Tommaso
- 129801 Tommcmahon
- 89735 Tommei
- 14395 Tommorgan
- 12309 Tommygrav
- 239126 Tommygreathouse
- 163639 Tomnash
- 45639 Tomney
- 20751 Tomnordheim
- 35343 Tomoda
- 4896 Tomoegozen
- 6570 Tomohiro
- 29450 Tomohiroohno
- 9100 Tomohisa
- 6101 Tomoki
- 22106 Tomokoarai
- 12387 Tomokofujiwara
- 6919 Tomonaga
- 24093 Tomoyamaguchi
- 330420 Tomroman
- 60614 Tomshea
- 4931 Tomsk
- 91888 Tomskilling
- 343322 Tomskuniver
- 5098 Tomsolomon
- 114689 Tomstevens
- 14941 Tomswift
- 133716 Tomtourville
- 9702 Tomvandijk
- 5434 Tomwhitney
- 590 Tomyris
- 25835 Tomzega
- 1266 Tone
- 6927 Tonegawa
- 16736 Tongariyama
- 23880 Tongil
- 707520 Tongji
- 26448 Tongjili
- 19002 Tongkexue
- 12418 Tongling
- 24977 Tongzhan
- 924 Toni
- 424200 Tonicelia
- 7229 Tonimoore
- 17822 Tonireland
- 14008 Toniscarmato
- 18991 Tonivanov
- 24070 Toniwest
- 12639 Tonkoopman
- 44527 Tonnon
- 8192 Tonucci
- 95928 Tonycook
- 13931 Tonydenault
- 8002 Tonyevans
- 133746 Tonyferro
- 561490 Tonyforward
- 10194 Tonygeorge
- 26668 Tonyho
- 112900 Tonyhoffman
- 69260 Tonyjudt
- 79417 Tonylevin
- 43224 Tonypensa
- 33491 Tonyroman
- 36177 Tonysharon
- 6487 Tonyspear
- 179223 Tonytyson
- 8380 Tooting
- 13079 Toots
- 54439 Topeka
- 33462 Tophergee
- 25152 Toplis
- 20752 Topputo
- 319651 Topografo
- 6514 Torahiko
- 18996 Torasan
- 13995 Tõravere
- 6577 Torbenwolff
- 29307 Torbernbergman
- 97186 Tore
- 98943 Torifune
- 16675 Torii
- 9523 Torino
- 282034 Torinodisangro
- 582910 Tormazsófia
- 1471 Tornio
- 1685 Toro
- 10538 Torode
- 434050 Törökfece
- 2104 Toronto
- 8777 Torquata
- 8773 Torquilla
- 34585 Torrano
- 24137 Torre del Lago
- 2614 Torrence
- 20696 Torresduarte
- 7437 Torricelli
- 45685 Torrycoppin
- 34039 Torsteinvik
- 2687 Tortali
- 12999 Toruń
- 9108 Toruyusa
- 9793 Torvalds
- 3150 Tosa
- 6778 Tosamakoto
- 207563 Toscana
- 8209 Toscanelli
- 96086 Toscanos
- 4441 Toshie
- 8295 Toshifukushima
- 23886 Toshihamane
- 7027 Toshihanda
- 10319 Toshiharu
- 9098 Toshihiko
- 11471 Toshihirabayashi
- 23743 Toshikasuga
- 14963 Toshikazu
- 5877 Toshimaihara
- 5939 Toshimayeda
- 26500 Toshiohino
- 7487 Toshitanaka
- 8424 Toshitsumita
- 24157 Toshiyanagisawa
- 96348 Toshiyukimariko
- 11321 Tosimatumoto
- 21275 Tosiyasu
- 13334 Tost
- 8770 Totanus
- 541582 Tóthimre
- 10160 Totoro
- 4720 Tottori
- 31254 Totucciogrisanti
- 19251 Totziens
- 16725 Toudono
- 15857 Touji
- 11506 Toulouse-Lautrec
- 27896 Tourminator
- 31266 Tournefort
- 327082 Tournesol
- 31190 Toussaint
- 4179 Toutatis
- 5740 Toutoumi
- 278197 Touvron
- 2787 Tovarishch
- 3934 Tove
- 51415 Tovinder
- 27457 Tovinkere
- 4880 Tovstonogov
- 6131 Towen
- 33453 Townley
- 7781 Townsend
- 6990 Toya
- 12357 Toyako
- 6381 Toyama
- 4691 Toyen
- 7401 Toynbee
- 4714 Toyohiro
- 9060 Toyokawa
- 10767 Toyomasu
- 29474 Toyoshima
- 3533 Toyota
- 21348 Toyoteru
- 6011 Tozzi
- 788153 Trabia
- 7013 Trachet
- 20536 Tracicarter
- 12981 Tracicase
- 3532 Tracie
- 26471 Tracybecker
- 32406 Tracyhughes
- 30097 Traino
- 7445 Trajanus
- 294664 Trakai
- 318412 Tramelan
- 35725 Tramuntana
- 32533 Tranpham
- 715 Transvaalia
- 1537 Transylvania
- 25954 Trantow
- 541897 TRAPPIST
- 5968 Trauger
- 5651 Traversa
- 36187 Travisbarman
- 27507 Travisbrown
- 208917 Traviscarter
- 26502 Traviscole
- 570448 Travismetcalfe
- 211377 Travisturbyfill
- 483636 Treanor
- 364166 Trebek
- 48638 Třebíč
- 3735 Třeboň
- 142408 Trebur
- 25375 Treenajoi
- 7266 Trefftz
- 13494 Treiso
- 3830 Trelleborg
- 3806 Tremaine
- 11936 Tremolizzo
- 34877 Tremsin
- 17489 Trenker
- 41279 Trentman
- 3339 Treshnikov
- 19994 Tresini
- 3925 Tretʹyakov
- 24387 Trettel
- 16715 Trettenero
- 22831 Trevanvoorth
- 13716 Trevino
- 3465 Trevires
- 13268 Trevorcorbin
- 12184 Trevormerkley
- 20784 Trevorpowers
- 10346 Triathlon
- 619 Triberga
- 9937 Triceratops
- 23004 Triciatalbert
- 31189 Tricomi
- 6891 Triconia
- 45519 Triebold
- 281140 Trier
- 65692 Trifu
- 2522 Triglav
- 8325 Trigo-Rodriguez
- 20362 Trilling
- 22494 Trillium
- 355022 Triman
- 2990 Trimberger
- 9271 Trimble
- 37706 Trinchieri
- 20342 Trinh
- 29799 Trinirussell
- 24204 Trinkle
- 6623 Trioconbrio
- 25819 Tripathi
- 34879 Tripathiishan
- 2037 Tripaxeptalis
- 114739 Tripodi
- 21958 Tripuraneni
- 135889 Trisdalcanton
- 4287 Třísov
- 1966 Tristan
- 32142 Tristanguillot
- 14959 TRIUMF
- 33920 Trivisonno
- 28130 Troemper
- 21001 Trogrlic
- 205698 Troiani
- 1208 Troilus
- 3912 Troja
- 4990 Trombka
- 149968 Trondal
- 18281 Tros
- 17776 Troska
- 3702 Trubetskaya
- 19441 Trucpham
- 21753 Trudel
- 22900 Trudie
- 323552 Trudybell
- 28666 Trudygessler
- 15522 Trueblood
- 33677 Truell
- 90446 Truesdell
- 12101 Trujillo
- 17969 Truong
- 1408 Trusanda
- 25483 Trusheim
- 6691 Trussoni
- 667515 Truța
- 249521 Truth
- 14988 Tryggvason
- 2240 Tsai
- 3388 Tsanghinchi
- 6113 Tsap
- 24199 Tsarevsky
- 611586 Tsartlip
- 402920 Tsawout
- 175410 Tsayweanshun
- 99861 Tscharnuter
- 29881 Tschopp
- 2111 Tselina
- 5460 Tsénaatʼaʼí
- 25607 Tsengiching
- 18284 Tsereteli
- 2498 Tsesevich
- 611587 Tseycum
- 32613 Tseyuenman
- 4105 Tsia
- 21775 Tsiganis
- 16982 Tsinghua
- 1590 Tsiolkovskaja
- 551082 Tsiongtiong
- 28609 Tsirvoulis
- 65637 Tsniimash
- 2740 Tsoj
- 175586 Tsou
- 126888 Tspitzer
- 8560 Tsubaki
- 6211 Tsubame
- 4845 Tsubetsu
- 10884 Tsuboimasaki
- 7139 Tsubokawa
- 34503 Tsuchida
- 8044 Tsuchiyama
- 79254 Tsuda
- 46649 Tsudahiroyuki
- 23258 Tsuihark
- 25047 Tsuitehsin
- 8314 Tsuji
- 14504 Tsujimura
- 11579 Tsujitsuka
- 8156 Tsukada
- 27749 Tsukadaken
- 9256 Tsukamoto
- 309227 Tsukiko
- 13918 Tsukinada
- 6599 Tsuko
- 7788 Tsukuba
- 10412 Tsukuyomi
- 7443 Tsumura
- 22914 Tsunanmachi
- 8543 Tsunemi
- 4402 Tsunemori
- 11514 Tsunenaga
- 17563 Tsuneyoshi
- 4097 Tsurugisan
- 5215 Tsurui
- 10744 Tsuruta
- 6313 Tsurutani
- 23950 Tsusakamoto
- 7713 Tsutomu
- 6023 Tsuyashima
- 23819 Tsuyoshi
- 34504 Tsuzuku
- 2770 Tsvet
- 3511 Tsvetaeva
- 10729 Tsvetkova
- 24605 Tsykalyuk
- 8867 Tubbiolo
- 42183 Tubiana
- 1481 Tübingia
- 241528 Tubman
- 231571 Tubolyvince
- 2013 Tucapel
- 3803 Tuchkova
- 12401 Tucholsky
- 10914 Tucker
- 1038 Tuckia
- 2224 Tucson
- 711527 Tudor
- 564280 Tudorica
- 1323 Tugela
- 8343 Tugendhat
- 12711 Tukmit
- 8985 Tula
- 9146 Tulikov
- 1095 Tulipa
- 15869 Tullius
- 18949 Tumaneng
- 3614 Tumilty
- 7871 Tunder
- 5471 Tunguska
- 1070 Tunica
- 6362 Tunis
- 13994 Tuominen
- 1425 Tuorla
- 472054 Tupaia
- 12704 Tupolev
- 530 Turandot
- 547398 Turánpál
- 23402 Turchina
- 3323 Turgenev
- 10089 Turgot
- 10204 Turing
- 2584 Turkmenia
- 1496 Turku
- 7863 Turnbull
- 1186 Turnera
- 12860 Turney
- 4054 Turnov
- 33334 Turon
- 81971 Turonclavere
- 708658 Turowicz
- 352273 Turrell
- 28889 Turrentine
- 11803 Turrini
- 6229 Tursachan
- 12053 Turtlestar
- 52633 Turvey
- 14486 Tuscia
- 10269 Tusi
- 4848 Tutenchamun
- 10721 Tuterov
- 47650 Tuthill
- 4846 Tuthmosis
- 14989 Tutte
- 5036 Tuttle
- 36773 Tuttlekeane
- 266711 Tuttlingen
- 2716 Tuulikki
- 2610 Tuva
- 11829 Tuvikene
- 31230 Tuyouyou
- 3261 Tvardovskij
- 7771 Tvären
- 21754 Tvaruzkova
- 2491 Tvashtri
- 22791 Twarog
- 9387 Tweedledee
- 17681 Tweedledum
- 117586 Twilatho
- 5500 Twilley
- 23068 Tyagi
- 306479 Tyburhoe
- 258 Tyche
- 1677 Tycho Brahe
- 20952 Tydeus
- 18786 Tyjorgenson
- 21970 Tyle
- 113333 Tyler
- 28451 Tylerhoward
- 4933 Tylerlinder
- 21677 Tylerlyon
- 665079 Tym
- 253536 Tymchenko
- 22451 Tymothycoons
- 14537 Týn nad Vltavou
- 22694 Tyndall
- 8125 Tyndareus
- 1055 Tynka
- 42355 Typhon
- 4092 Tyr
- 9951 Tyrannosaurus
- 13123 Tyson
- 19130 Tytgat
- 2120 Tyumenia
- 9927 Tyutchev
- 207901 Tzecmaun
- 192208 Tzu Chi
back to top

== See also ==
- List of minor planet discoverers
- List of observatory codes
- Meanings of minor planet names § Index
