= List of named minor planets: 9000–9999 =

This is a partial list of named minor planets in numerical order. It contains a total of 754 entries as of 13 April 2026. Minor planets for which no article exist are displayed in grey color and redirect to the list of minor planets (see List of minor planets § Main index).

== From 9,000 to 9,999 ==
- 9000 Hal
- 9001 Slettebak
- 9002 Gabrynowicz
- 9003 Ralphmilliken
- 9004 Peekaydee
- 9005 Sidorova
- 9006 Voytkevych
- 9007 James Bond
- 9008 Bohšternberk
- 9009 Tirso
- 9010 Candelo
- 9011 Angelou
- 9012 Benner
- 9013 Sansaturio
- 9014 Svyatorichter
- 9015 Coe
- 9016 Henrymoore
- 9017 Babadzhanyan
- 9018 Galache
- 9019 Eucommia
- 9020 Eucryphia
- 9021 Fagus
- 9022 Drake
- 9023 Mnesthus
- 9024 Gunnargraps
- 9025 Polanskey
- 9026 Denevi
- 9027 Graps
- 9028 Konrádbeneš
- 9030 Othryoneus
- 9032 Tanakami
- 9033 Kawane
- 9034 Oleyuria
- 9038 Helensteel
- 9040 Flacourtia
- 9041 Takane
- 9044 Kaoru
- 9052 Uhland
- 9053 Hamamelis
- 9054 Hippocastanum
- 9055 Edvardsson
- 9056 Piskunov
- 9059 Dumas
- 9060 Toyokawa
- 9062 Ohnishi
- 9063 Washi
- 9064 Johndavies
- 9067 Katsuno
- 9069 Hovland
- 9070 Ensab
- 9071 Coudenberghe
- 9073 Yoshinori
- 9074 Yosukeyoshida
- 9076 Shinsaku
- 9077 Ildo
- 9079 Gesner
- 9080 Takayanagi
- 9081 Hideakianno
- 9082 Leonardmartin
- 9083 Ramboehm
- 9084 Achristou
- 9087 Neff
- 9088 Maki
- 9090 Chirotenmondai
- 9091 Ishidatakaki
- 9092 Nanyang
- 9093 Sorada
- 9094 Butsuen
- 9096 Tamotsu
- 9097 Davidschlag
- 9098 Toshihiko
- 9099 Kenjitanabe
- 9100 Tomohisa
- 9101 Rossiglione
- 9102 Foglar
- 9103 Komatsubara
- 9104 Matsuo
- 9105 Matsumura
- 9106 Yatagarasu
- 9107 Narukospa
- 9108 Toruyusa
- 9109 Yukomotizuki
- 9110 Choukai
- 9111 Matarazzo
- 9112 Hatsulars
- 9114 Hatakeyama
- 9115 Battisti
- 9116 Billhamilton
- 9117 Aude
- 9119 Georgpeuerbach
- 9121 Stefanovalentini
- 9122 Hunten
- 9123 Yoshiko
- 9126 Samcoulson
- 9127 Brucekoehn
- 9128 Takatumuzi
- 9130 Galois
- 9132 Walteranderson
- 9133 d'Arrest
- 9134 Encke
- 9135 Lacaille
- 9136 Lalande
- 9137 Remo
- 9138 Murdoch
- 9139 Barrylasker
- 9140 Deni
- 9141 Kapur
- 9142 Rhesus
- 9143 Burkhead
- 9144 Hollisjohnson
- 9145 Shustov
- 9146 Tulikov
- 9147 Kourakuen
- 9148 Boriszaitsev
- 9150 Zavolokin
- 9151 Kettnergriswold
- 9152 Combe
- 9153 Chikurinji
- 9154 Kolʹtsovo
- 9155 Verkhodanov
- 9156 Malanin
- 9158 Platè
- 9159 McDonnell
- 9161 Beaufort
- 9162 Kwiila
- 9164 Colbert
- 9165 Raup
- 9167 Kharkiv
- 9168 Sarov
- 9171 Carolyndiane
- 9172 Abhramu
- 9173 Viola Castello
- 9175 Graun
- 9176 Struchkova
- 9177 Donsaari
- 9178 Momoyo
- 9179 Satchmo
- 9180 Samsagan
- 9184 Vasilij
- 9186 Fumikotsukimoto
- 9187 Walterkröll
- 9189 Hölderlin
- 9190 Masako
- 9191 Hokuto
- 9193 Geoffreycopland
- 9194 Ananoff
- 9196 Sukagawa
- 9197 Endo
- 9198 Sasagamine
- 9203 Myrtus
- 9204 Mörike
- 9205 Eddywally
- 9206 Yanaikeizo
- 9207 Petersmith
- 9208 Takanotoshi
- 9211 Neese
- 9212 Kanamaru
- 9215 Taiyonoto
- 9216 Masuzawa
- 9217 Kitagawa
- 9218 Ishiikazuo
- 9220 Yoshidayama
- 9221 Wuliangyong
- 9222 Chubey
- 9223 Leifandersson
- 9224 Železný
- 9225 Daiki
- 9226 Arimahiroshi
- 9227 Ashida
- 9228 Nakahiroshi
- 9229 Matsuda
- 9230 Yasuda
- 9231 Shimaken
- 9232 Miretti
- 9233 Itagijun
- 9234 Matsumototaku
- 9235 Shimanamikaido
- 9236 Obermair
- 9238 Yavapai
- 9239 van Riebeeck
- 9240 Nassau
- 9241 Rosfranklin
- 9242 Olea
- 9243 Alag
- 9244 Višnjan
- 9246 Niemeyer
- 9248 Sauer
- 9249 Yen
- 9250 Chamberlin
- 9251 Harch
- 9252 Goddard
- 9253 Oberth
- 9254 Shunkai
- 9255 Inoutadataka
- 9256 Tsukamoto
- 9257 Kunisuke
- 9258 Johnpauljones
- 9259 Janvanparadijs
- 9260 Edwardolson
- 9261 Peggythomson
- 9262 Bordovitsyna
- 9263 Khariton
- 9265 Ekman
- 9266 Holger
- 9267 Lokrume
- 9268 Jeremihschneider
- 9269 Peterolufemi
- 9270 Sherryjennings
- 9271 Trimble
- 9272 Liseleje
- 9273 Schloerb
- 9274 Amylovell
- 9275 Persson
- 9276 Timgrove
- 9277 Togashi
- 9278 Matera
- 9279 Seager
- 9280 Stevenjoy
- 9281 Weryk
- 9282 Lucylim
- 9283 Martinelvis
- 9284 Juansanchez
- 9285 Le Corre
- 9286 Patricktaylor
- 9287 Klima
- 9288 Santos-Sanz
- 9289 Balau
- 9291 Alanburdick
- 9293 Kamogata
- 9295 Donaldyoung
- 9297 Marchuk
- 9298 Geake
- 9299 Vinceteri
- 9300 Johannes
- 9305 Hazard
- 9306 Pittosporum
- 9307 Regiomontanus
- 9308 Randyrose
- 9309 Platanus
- 9313 Protea
- 9315 Weigel
- 9316 Rhamnus
- 9319 Hartzell
- 9321 Alexkonopliv
- 9322 Lindenau
- 9323 Hirohisasato
- 9325 Stonehenge
- 9326 Ruta
- 9327 Duerbeck
- 9329 Nikolaimedtner
- 9331 Fannyhensel
- 9333 Hiraimasa
- 9334 Moesta
- 9336 Altenburg
- 9339 Kimnovak
- 9340 Williamholden
- 9341 Gracekelly
- 9342 Carygrant
- 9344 Klopstock
- 9346 Fernandel
- 9349 Lucas
- 9350 Waseda
- 9351 Neumayer
- 9356 Elineke
- 9357 Venezuela
- 9358 Fårö
- 9359 Fleringe
- 9362 Miyajima
- 9364 Clusius
- 9365 Chinesewilson
- 9368 Esashi
- 9372 Vamlingbo
- 9373 Hamra
- 9374 Sundre
- 9375 Omodaka
- 9376 Thionville
- 9377 Metz
- 9378 Nancy-Lorraine
- 9379 Dijon
- 9380 Mâcon
- 9381 Lyon
- 9382 Mihonoseki
- 9383 Montélimar
- 9384 Aransio
- 9385 Avignon
- 9386 Hitomi
- 9387 Tweedledee
- 9388 Takeno
- 9389 Condillac
- 9391 Slee
- 9392 Cavaillon
- 9393 Apta
- 9394 Manosque
- 9395 Saint Michel
- 9396 Yamaneakisato
- 9397 Lombardi
- 9398 Bidelman
- 9399 Pesch
- 9403 Sanduleak
- 9405 Johnratje
- 9407 Kimuranaoto
- 9408 Haseakira
- 9409 Kanpuzan
- 9411 Hitomiyamoto
- 9413 Eichendorff
- 9414 Masamimurakami
- 9415 Yujiokimura
- 9416 Miyahara
- 9417 Jujiishii
- 9418 Mayumi
- 9419 Keikochaki
- 9420 Dewar
- 9421 Violilla
- 9422 Kuboniwa
- 9423 Abt
- 9424 Hiroshinishiyama
- 9425 Marconcini
- 9426 Aliante
- 9427 Righini
- 9428 Angelalouise
- 9429 Poreč
- 9430 Erichthonios
- 9431 Pytho
- 9432 Iba
- 9434 Bokusen
- 9435 Odafukashi
- 9436 Shudo
- 9437 Hironari
- 9438 Satie
- 9442 Beiligong
- 9445 Charpentier
- 9446 Cicero
- 9447 Julesbordet
- 9448 Donaldavies
- 9449 Petrbondy
- 9450 Akikoizumo
- 9452 Rogerpeeters
- 9453 Mallorca
- 9454 Ardeishar
- 9458 Beaumont
- 9459 Gracecai
- 9460 McGlynn
- 9461 Cotingkeh
- 9463 Criscione
- 9465 Fergusonsam
- 9466 Shishir
- 9468 Brewer
- 9469 Shashank
- 9470 Jussieu
- 9471 Ostend
- 9472 Bruges
- 9473 Ghent
- 9474 Cassadrury
- 9476 Vincenthuang
- 9477 Kefennell
- 9478 Caldeyro
- 9479 Madresplazamayo
- 9480 Inti
- 9481 Menchú
- 9482 Rubéndarío
- 9483 Chagas
- 9484 Wanambi
- 9485 Uluru
- 9486 Utemorrah
- 9487 Kupe
- 9488 Huia
- 9489 Tanemahuta
- 9490 Gosemeijer
- 9491 Thooft
- 9492 Veltman
- 9493 Enescu
- 9494 Donici
- 9495 Eminescu
- 9496 Ockels
- 9497 Dwingeloo
- 9498 Westerbork
- 9499 Excalibur
- 9500 Camelot
- 9501 Ywain
- 9502 Gaimar
- 9503 Agrawain
- 9504 Lionel
- 9505 Lohengrin
- 9506 Telramund
- 9507 Gottfried
- 9508 Titurel
- 9509 Amfortas
- 9510 Gurnemanz
- 9511 Klingsor
- 9512 Feijunlong
- 9514 Deineka
- 9515 Dubner
- 9516 Inasan
- 9517 Niehaisheng
- 9518 Robbynaish
- 9519 Jeffkeck
- 9520 Montydibiasi
- 9521 Martinhoffmann
- 9522 Schlichting
- 9523 Torino
- 9524 O'Rourke
- 9525 Amandasickafoose
- 9526 Billmckinnon
- 9527 Sherrypervan
- 9528 Küppers
- 9529 Protopapa
- 9530 Kelleymichael
- 9531 Jean-Luc
- 9532 Abramenko
- 9533 Aleksejleonov
- 9535 Plitchenko
- 9536 Statler
- 9537 Nolan
- 9539 Prishvin
- 9540 Mikhalkov
- 9541 Magri
- 9542 Eryan
- 9543 Nitra
- 9544 Scottbirney
- 9545 Petrovedomosti
- 9548 Fortran
- 9549 Akplatonov
- 9550 Victorblanco
- 9551 Kazi
- 9553 Colas
- 9554 Dumont
- 9555 Frejakocha
- 9556 Gaywray
- 9560 Anguita
- 9561 van Eyck
- 9562 Memling
- 9563 Kitty
- 9564 Jeffwynn
- 9565 Tikhonov
- 9566 Rykhlova
- 9567 Surgut
- 9569 Quintenmatsijs
- 9573 Matsumotomas
- 9574 Taku
- 9576 van der Weyden
- 9577 Gropius
- 9578 Klyazma
- 9579 Passchendaele
- 9580 Tarumi
- 9583 Clerke
- 9584 Louchheim
- 9587 Bonpland
- 9588 Quesnay
- 9589 Deridder
- 9590 Hyria
- 9592 Clairaut
- 9594 Garstang
- 9599 Onotomoko
- 9602 Oya
- 9604 Bellevanzuylen
- 9605 A Coruña
- 9609 Ponomarevalya
- 9610 Vischer
- 9611 Anouck
- 9612 Belgorod
- 9614 Cuvier
- 9615 Hemerijckx
- 9617 Grahamchapman
- 9618 Johncleese
- 9619 Terrygilliam
- 9620 Ericidle
- 9621 Michaelpalin
- 9622 Terryjones
- 9623 Karlsson
- 9626 Stanley
- 9628 Sendaiotsuna
- 9629 Servet
- 9630 Castellion
- 9631 Hubertreeves
- 9632 Sudo
- 9633 Cotur
- 9634 Vodice
- 9636 Emanuelaspessot
- 9637 Perryrose
- 9638 Fuchs
- 9639 Scherer
- 9640 Lippens
- 9641 Demazière
- 9642 Takatahiro
- 9645 Grünewald
- 9648 Gotouhideo
- 9649 Junfukue
- 9650 Okadaira
- 9651 Arii-SooHoo
- 9654 Seitennokai
- 9655 Yaburanger
- 9656 Kurokawahiroki
- 9657 Učka
- 9658 Imabari
- 9660 Brucewillis
- 9661 Hohmann
- 9662 Frankhubbard
- 9663 Zwin
- 9664 Brueghel
- 9665 Inastronoviny
- 9667 Amastrinc
- 9668 Tianyahaijiao
- 9669 Symmetria
- 9670 Magni
- 9671 Hemera
- 9672 Rosenbergerezek
- 9673 Kunishimakoto
- 9674 Slovenija
- 9676 Eijkman
- 9677 Gowlandhopkins
- 9678 van der Meer
- 9679 Crutzen
- 9680 Molina
- 9681 Sherwoodrowland
- 9682 Gravesande
- 9683 Rambaldo
- 9684 Olieslagers
- 9685 Korteweg
- 9686 Keesom
- 9687 Uhlenbeck
- 9688 Goudsmit
- 9689 Freudenthal
- 9690 Houtgast
- 9691 Zwaan
- 9692 Kuperus
- 9693 Bleeker
- 9694 Lycomedes
- 9695 Johnheise
- 9696 Jaffe
- 9697 Louwman
- 9698 Idzerda
- 9699 Baumhauer
- 9700 Paech
- 9701 Mak
- 9702 Tomvandijk
- 9703 Sussenbach
- 9704 Georgebeekman
- 9705 Drummen
- 9706 Bouma
- 9707 Petruskoning
- 9708 Gouka
- 9709 Chrisnell
- 9711 Želetava
- 9712 Nauplius
- 9713 Oeax
- 9714 Piazzismyth
- 9715 Paolotanga
- 9716 Severina
- 9717 Lyudvasilia
- 9718 Gerbefremov
- 9719 Yakage
- 9720 Ulfbirgitta
- 9721 Doty
- 9722 Levi-Montalcini
- 9723 Binyang
- 9724 Villanueva
- 9725 Wainscoat
- 9726 Verbiscer
- 9727 Skrutskie
- 9728 Videen
- 9732 Juchnovski
- 9733 Valtikhonov
- 9737 Dudarova
- 9739 Powell
- 9741 Solokhin
- 9742 Worpswede
- 9743 Tohru
- 9744 Nielsen
- 9745 Shinkenwada
- 9746 Kazukoichikawa
- 9748 van Ostaijen
- 9749 Van den Eijnde
- 9751 Kadota
- 9756 Ezaki
- 9757 Felixdejager
- 9758 Dainty
- 9761 Krautter
- 9762 Hermannhesse
- 9764 Morgenstern
- 9766 Bradbury
- 9767 Midsomer Norton
- 9768 Stephenmaran
- 9769 Nautilus
- 9770 Discovery
- 9774 Annjudge
- 9775 Joeferguson
- 9777 Enterprise
- 9778 Isabelallende
- 9780 Bandersnatch
- 9781 Jubjubbird
- 9782 Edo
- 9783 Tensho-kan
- 9784 Yotsubashi
- 9785 Senjikan
- 9786 Gakutensoku
- 9788 Yagami
- 9790 Deipyrus
- 9791 Kamiyakurai
- 9792 Nonodakesan
- 9793 Torvalds
- 9795 Deprez
- 9796 Robotti
- 9797 Raes
- 9799 Thronium
- 9800 Shigetoshi
- 9801 Mikewang
- 9804 Shrikulkarni
- 9807 Rhene
- 9808 Navamijain
- 9809 Jimdarwin
- 9810 Elanfiller
- 9811 Cavadore
- 9812 Danco
- 9813 Rozgaj
- 9814 Ivobenko
- 9815 Mariakirch
- 9816 von Matt
- 9817 Thersander
- 9818 Eurymachos
- 9819 Sangerhausen
- 9820 Hempel
- 9821 Gitakresáková
- 9822 Hajduková
- 9823 Annantalová
- 9824 Marylea
- 9825 Oetken
- 9826 Ehrenfreund
- 9828 Antimachos
- 9829 Murillo
- 9830 Franciswasiak
- 9831 Simongreen
- 9832 Xiaobinwang
- 9833 Rilke
- 9834 Kirsanov
- 9836 Aarseth
- 9837 Jerryhorow
- 9838 Falz-Fein
- 9839 Crabbegat
- 9841 Mašek
- 9842 Funakoshi
- 9843 Braidwood
- 9844 Otani
- 9845 Okamuraosamu
- 9848 Yugra
- 9850 Ralphcopeland
- 9851 Sakamoto
- 9852 Gora
- 9853 l'Épée
- 9854 Karlheinz
- 9855 Thomasdick
- 9857 Hecamede
- 9859 Van Lierde
- 9860 Archaeopteryx
- 9861 Jahreiss
- 9863 Reichardt
- 9865 Akiraohta
- 9866 Kanaimitsuo
- 9869 Yadoumaru
- 9870 Maehata
- 9871 Jeon
- 9872 Solf
- 9873 Freundlich
- 9878 Sostero
- 9879 Mammuthus
- 9880 Stegosaurus
- 9881 Sampson
- 9882 Stallman
- 9883 Veecas
- 9884 Příbram
- 9885 Linux
- 9886 Aoyagi
- 9887 Ashikaga
- 9891 Stephensmith
- 9892 Meigetsuki
- 9893 Sagano
- 9897 Malerba
- 9898 Yoshiro
- 9899 Greaves
- 9900 Llull
- 9902 Kirkpatrick
- 9903 Leonhardt
- 9904 Mauratombelli
- 9905 Tiziano
- 9906 Tintoretto
- 9907 Oileus
- 9908 Aue
- 9909 Eschenbach
- 9910 Vogelweide
- 9911 Quantz
- 9912 Donizetti
- 9913 Humperdinck
- 9914 Obukhova
- 9915 Potanin
- 9916 Kibirev
- 9917 Keynes
- 9918 Timtrenkle
- 9919 Undset
- 9920 Bagnulo
- 9921 Rubincam
- 9922 Catcheller
- 9923 Ronaldthiel
- 9924 Corrigan
- 9925 Juliehoskin
- 9926 Desch
- 9927 Tyutchev
- 9929 McConnell
- 9930 Billburrows
- 9931 Herbhauptman
- 9932 Kopylov
- 9933 Alekseev
- 9934 Caccioppoli
- 9936 Al-Biruni
- 9937 Triceratops
- 9938 Kretlow
- 9941 Iguanodon
- 9943 Bizan
- 9945 Karinaxavier
- 9947 Takaishuji
- 9949 Brontosaurus
- 9950 ESA
- 9951 Tyrannosaurus
- 9954 Brachiosaurus
- 9956 Castellaz
- 9957 Raffaellosanti
- 9960 Sekine
- 9962 Pfau
- 9963 Sandage
- 9964 Hideyonoguchi
- 9965 GNU
- 9967 Awanoyumi
- 9968 Serpe
- 9969 Braille
- 9971 Ishihara
- 9972 Minoruoda
- 9973 Szpilman
- 9974 Brody
- 9975 Takimotokoso
- 9977 Kentakunimoto
- 9981 Kudo
- 9983 Rickfienberg
- 9984 Gregbryant
- 9985 Akiko
- 9986 Hirokun
- 9987 Peano
- 9988 Erictemplebell
- 9990 Niiyaeki
- 9991 Anežka
- 9993 Kumamoto
- 9994 Grotius
- 9995 Alouette
- 9996 ANS
- 9997 COBE
- 9998 ISO
- 9999 Wiles
back to top

== See also ==
- List of minor planet discoverers
- List of observatory codes
- Meanings of minor planet names § Index
