= Julie Vinter Hansen =

Danish astronomer (1890-1960)

- Hansen in 1948
- Born: Julie Marie Vinter Hansen; 20 July 1890; Copenhagen, Denmark
- Died: 27 July 1960 (aged 70); Mürren, Switzerland
- Education: University of Copenhagen
- Awards: Annie Jump Cannon Award in Astronomy (1940)
- Scientific career
- Fields: Astronomy

Julie Marie Vinter Hansen (20 July 1890 – 27 July 1960) was a Danish astronomer. She was the first woman in Denmark to earn an academic degree in astronomy.

== Life ==
=== Early life ===
Vinter Hansen was born in Copenhagen, Denmark.

=== Education ===
While studying at the University of Copenhagen, she was appointed as a computer at the university's observatory in 1915. She was the first woman to hold an appointment at the university. She was later appointed observatory assistant and, in 1922, observer.

== Career ==
=== Editor of Nordic Astronomy Review ===
She was a very energetic worker, who, along with her normal work of observing and performing mathematical reductions of observations took on the task of editing the Nordisk Astronomisk Tidsskrift (Nordic Astronomy Review).

=== International Astronomical Union ===
She later became Director of the International Astronomical Union's telegram bureau and Editor of its Circulars.

=== Work as Astronomer at University of Copenhagen ===
By 1939, Vinter Hansen was the First Astronomer at the Observatory of the University of Copenhagen, widely known for her accurate computation of orbits of minor planets and comets.

=== Tagea Brandt Rejselegat Award ===
In that 1939 she received the Tagea Brandt Rejselegat (travel award), given to women that have made big contributions on arts or science. With the award money (DKK 10.000 or 160,000 of actual US $) undertook a tour through the United States to Japan and back. On her return trip in 1940, the outbreak of World War II restricted her homeward journey.

=== Work in University of California ===
She was awarded a Martin Kellogg Fellowship at the University of California which allowed her to work for a time in the United States. Also in 1940 she was awarded the Annie J. Cannon Award in Astronomy.

=== Return to Denmark ===
Vinter Hansen was appointed Knight of the Order of the Dannebrog in 1956 and continued her career at the University of Copenhagen until 1960.

== Death ==
Julie Vinter Hansen died in 1960, from a heart-failure just days before her retirement, in her beloved vacation destination, the Swiss mountain village of Mürren, and was buried in Copenhagen. The minor planet 1544 Vinterhansenia, discovered by Finnish astronomer Liisi Oterma in the 1940s, was named in her honour.

== Awards ==
- Knight of the Order of the Dannebrog (1956)
- Annie J. Cannon Award in Astronomy (1940)
- Martin Kellogg Fellowship
- Tagea Brandt Rejselegat Award.

== Sources ==
- Rasmusen, H.Q. (March 1961). "Julie Marie Vinter Hansen (obituary)". Quarterly Journal of the Royal Astronomical Society. 2: 38. Bibcode:1961QJRAS...2...38.
