= Tengström =

Tengström is a Finnish family of priests. The first Tengström moved from Sweden to Finland after the Greater Wrath.

== Notable members ==
- Jakob Tengström (1755–1832), the first Archbishop of Turku
  - Carl Fredrik Tengström, accountant of the Senate of Finland, nephew of Jakob Tengström
    - Fredrika Charlotta Runeberg (Tengström, 1807 – 1879), author, wife of Johan Ludvig Runeberg
  - Johan Jakob Tengström (1787–1858), scientist and author, nephew of Jakob Tengström
    - Johan Robert Tengström (1823–46), philosopher, son of J. J.
- Erik Tengström (1913–1996), Swedish astronomer and geodesist
- G. Tengström, member of the January Commission in 1861
- Oscar Tengström, actor, founder of the Lilla Teatern

== See also ==
Swedish-speaking Finns
