= Kōichirō Tomita =

Japanese astronomer

Minor planets discovered: 9
2252 CERGA	1 November 1978
3056 INAG	1 November 1978
3765 Texereau	16 September 1982
4051 Hatanaka	1 November 1978
8788 Labeyrie	1 November 1978
8986 Kineyayasuyo	1 November 1978
11258 Aoyama	1 November 1978
(32738) 1978 VT_{1}	1 November 1978
(69234) 1978 VO_{2}	1 November 1978

Kōichirō Tomita (冨田 弘一郎, Tomita Kōichirō; 16 February 1925 – 22 May 2006) was a Japanese astronomer, discoverer of minor planets and comets.

The fireball passed over west Japan and was recorded by photos and a sketch. Kōichirō Tomita identified that it was the Kosmos 133 spacecraft (30 November 1966).

He is credited by the Minor Planet Center with the discovery of 9 numbered minor planets during 1978–1982, such as 2252 CERGA, 3056 INAG, 3765 Texereau, 4051 Hatanaka.

He is the author of at least one astronomy book (in Japanese) about comets (which was translated and published in Russian in 1982).

The Nysa asteroid 2391 Tomita is named after him.
