= 2159 Kukkamäki =

Stony asteroid

2159 Kukkamaki
Discovery
- Discovered by: L. Oterma
- Discovery site: Turku Obs.
- Discovery date: 16 October 1941

Designations
- Named after: Tauno Kukkamäki (geodesist)
- Alternative designations: 1941 UX · 1929 TL; 1933 UU_{1} · 1935 EL; 1939 FS · 1949 WM; 1951 GG_{1} · 1970 EB; 1974 CD_{1} · 1978 EB
- Minor planet category: main-belt · (inner)

Orbital characteristics
- Epoch 4 September 2017 (JD 2458000.5)
- Uncertainty parameter 0
- Observation arc: 87.58 yr (31,989 days)
- Aphelion: 2.5808 AU
- Perihelion: 2.3847 AU
- Semi-major axis: 2.4827 AU
- Eccentricity: 0.0395
- Orbital period (sidereal): 3.91 yr (1,429 days)
- Mean anomaly: 75.776°
- Mean motion: 0° 15^{m} 6.84^{s} / day
- Inclination: 3.2676°
- Longitude of ascending node: 351.15°
- Argument of perihelion: 122.78°

Physical characteristics
- Dimensions: 9.86±1.04 km 11.30 km (derived); 11.494±0.121; 12.143±0.176 km
- Synodic rotation period: 3.4 h (outdated); 4.06 h
- Geometric albedo: 0.1743±0.0290; 0.193±0.025; 0.20 (assumed); 0.337±0.253
- Spectral type: B–V = 0.870; S (assumed) · S
- Absolute magnitude (H): 11.77±0.11 · 11.83 · 12.07 · 12.1

2159 Kukkamäki, provisional designation 1941 UX, is a stony asteroid from the inner region of the asteroid belt, approximately 11 kilometers in diameter. It was discovered on 16 October 1941, by Finnish astronomer Liisi Oterma at Turku Observatory in Southwest Finland. It was later named after Finnish geodesist Tauno Kukkamäki.

== Orbit and classification ==
Kukkamäki is a stony S-type asteroid. It orbits the Sun in the inner main-belt at a distance of 2.4–2.6 AU once every 3 years and 11 months (1,429 days). Its orbit has an eccentricity of 0.04 and an inclination of 3° with respect to the ecliptic. Kukkamäki was first identified as 1929 TL at Lowell Observatory in 1929, extending the body's observation arc by 12 prior to its official discovery observation.

== Diameter and albedo ==
According to the survey carried out by NASA's Wide-field Infrared Survey Explorer with its subsequent NEOWISE mission, Kukkamäki measures between 9.86 and 12.14 kilometers in diameter, and its surface has an albedo between 0.193 and 0.337, while the Collaborative Asteroid Lightcurve Link assumes a standard albedo for stony asteroids of 0.20 and derives a diameter of 11.30 kilometers based on an absolute magnitude of 12.1.

== Lightcurve ==
During an asteroid survey conducted at McDonald Observatory and CTIO in the 1980s, a rotational lightcurve of Kukkamäki was obtained by astronomer Richard Binzel. The photoelectric observation gave a well-defined rotation period of 4.06 hours with a brightness variation of 0.32 magnitude (U=3), superseding a previous result based on a fragmentary lightcurve.

== Naming ==
This minor planet was named after Finnish geodesist Tauno Kukkamäki (1909–1997), who was the director of the Finnish Geodetic Institute for many years and the president of the International Association of Geodesy. He was also a distinguished disciple of Yrjö Väisälä. The official naming citation was published by the Minor Planet Center on 1 November 1979 (M.P.C. 5014).
