= Tauno Kukkamäki =

Finnish geodesist (1909–1997)

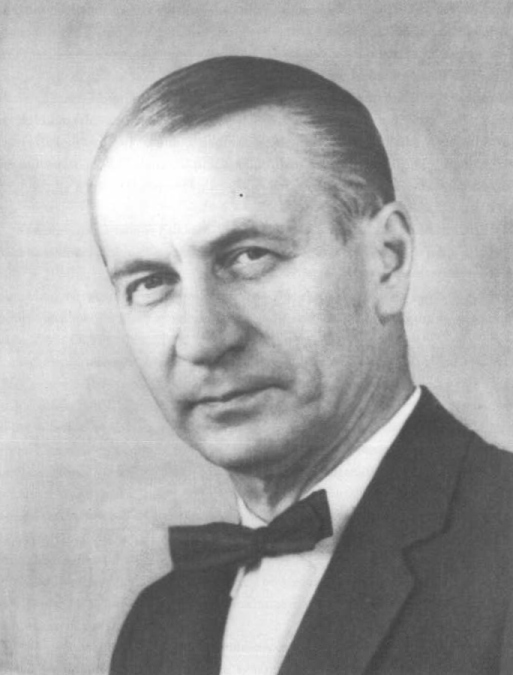
Tauno Kukkamäki in the early 1960s

Tauno Johannes Kukkamäki (11 October 1909 – 1 May 1997) was a Finnish geodesist renowned especially for his research into levelling refraction. He defended his doctoral thesis in University of Turku in 1940 on the metrology of length by means of the Väisälä comparator. He served as the director of the Finnish Geodetic Institute (1963–1977) and as the president of the International Association of Geodesy. The minor planet 2159 Kukkamäki was named in his honour.
