= 1522 Kokkola =

Vestian asteroid

Discovery
- Discovered by: L. Oterma
- Discovery site: Turku Obs.
- Discovery date: 18 November 1938

Designations
- Named after: Kokkola (Finnish town)
- Alternative designations: 1938 WO · 1949 WB
- Minor planet category: main-belt · Vestoid

Orbital characteristics
- Epoch 4 September 2017 (JD 2458000.5)
- Uncertainty parameter 0
- Observation arc: 77.72 yr (28,389 days)
- Aphelion: 2.5398 AU
- Perihelion: 2.1955 AU
- Semi-major axis: 2.3677 AU
- Eccentricity: 0.0727
- Orbital period (sidereal): 3.64 yr (1,331 days)
- Mean anomaly: 196.45°
- Mean motion: 0° 16^{m} 13.8^{s} / day
- Inclination: 5.3522°
- Longitude of ascending node: 60.617°
- Argument of perihelion: 30.542°

Physical characteristics
- Dimensions: 8.65±0.57 km 9.422±0.094 km 9.57 km (derived); 9.781±0.080 km
- Synodic rotation period: 5.83 h
- Geometric albedo: 0.1924±0.0374; 0.20 (assumed); 0.206±0.011; 0.252±0.025
- Spectral type: LS · S B–V = 0.880; U–B = 0.510
- Absolute magnitude (H): 12.30±0.35 · 12.43 · 12.46

1522 Kokkola (provisional designation 1938 WO) is a stony Vestian asteroid from the inner regions of the asteroid belt, approximately 9.5 kilometers in diameter. It was discovered on 18 November 1938, by pioneering Finnish astronomer Liisi Oterma at Turku Observatory in Southwest Finland. It was later named for the town of Kokkola.

== Classification and orbit ==
The S-type asteroid and member of the Vesta family is also classified as LS-type, an intermediate to the L-types. It orbits the Sun at a distance of 2.2–2.5 AU once every 3 years and 8 months (1,331 days). Its orbit has an eccentricity of 0.07 and an inclination of 5° with respect to the ecliptic. Due to a precovery taken at Turku, Kokkola's observation arc was extended by 3 weeks prior to its official discovery observation.

== Physical characteristics ==
In May 1984, American astronomer Richard Binzel obtained a rotational lightcurve of Kokkola from photometric observations. Lightcurve analysis gave a well-defined rotation period of 5.83 hours with a brightness amplitude of 0.29 magnitude (U=3).

According to the survey carried out by NASA's Wide-field Infrared Survey Explorer with its subsequent NEOWISE mission, Kokkola measures 9.42 kilometers in diameter and its surface has an albedo of 0.206 (revised albedo fits from 2014). The Collaborative Asteroid Lightcurve Link assumes an albedo of 0.20 and derives a diameter of 9.57 kilometers with an absolute magnitude of 12.46.

== Naming ==
This minor planet was named for Kokkola, a Finnish town and port on the Gulf of Bothnia. The official naming citation was published by the Minor Planet Center on 20 February 1976 (M.P.C. 3929).
