= 1695 Walbeck =

Carbonaceous main-belt asteroid

Discovery
- Discovered by: L. Oterma
- Discovery site: Turku Obs.
- Discovery date: 15 October 1941

Designations
- Named after: Henrik Walbeck (geodesist)
- Alternative designations: 1941 UO · 1964 QA; 1964 RE
- Minor planet category: main-belt · (middle)

Orbital characteristics
- Epoch 4 September 2017 (JD 2458000.5)
- Uncertainty parameter 0
- Observation arc: 75.44 yr (27,554 days)
- Aphelion: 3.5921 AU
- Perihelion: 1.9703 AU
- Semi-major axis: 2.7812 AU
- Eccentricity: 0.2916
- Orbital period (sidereal): 4.64 yr (1,694 days)
- Mean anomaly: 141.65°
- Mean motion: 0° 12^{m} 45^{s} / day
- Inclination: 16.705°
- Longitude of ascending node: 218.46°
- Argument of perihelion: 139.42°

Physical characteristics
- Dimensions: 17.88±0.27 km 18.953±0.258 km 19.60 km (derived); 19.62±0.8 km 19.84±0.29 km
- Synodic rotation period: 5.16±0.05 h 5.1607±0.0006 h 5.3 h
- Geometric albedo: 0.037±0.007; 0.042±0.006; 0.0425±0.0058; 0.0460 (derived); 0.0504±0.005; 0.051±0.002
- Spectral type: SMASS = Cg · C
- Absolute magnitude (H): 12.4 · 12.5 · 12.76±0.23 · 12.93

1695 Walbeck, provisional designation 1941 UO, is a carbonaceous asteroid from the central region of the asteroid belt, approximately 19 kilometers in diameter. It was discovered on 15 October 1941, by Finnish astronomer Liisi Oterma at Turku Observatory in Southwest Finland, and named after Henrik Walbeck.

== Classification and orbit ==
The asteroid orbits the Sun in the central main-belt at a distance of 2.0–3.6 AU once every 4 years and 8 months (1,694 days). Its orbit has an eccentricity of 0.29 and an inclination of 17° with respect to the ecliptic. Walbeck's observation arc begins the night after its official discovery observation.

== Physical characteristics ==
In the SMASS taxonomy, the carbonaceous asteroid is characterized as a Cg-type, an intermediate between the C-type and G-type asteroids.

=== Lightcurves ===
In November 2006, a rotational lightcurve of Walbeck was obtained from photometric observations by French amateur astronomer Pierre Antonini. It gave a rotation period of 5.1607 hours with a brightness variation of 0.22 magnitude (U=3). Two similar periods were obtained by David Romeuf and by a team of Hungarian astronomers (U=2/2).

=== Diameter and albedo ===
According to the surveys carried out by the Infrared Astronomical Satellite IRAS, the Japanese Akari satellite, and NASA's Wide-field Infrared Survey Explorer with its subsequent NEOWISE mission, Walbeck measures between 17.88 and 19.62 kilometers in diameter and its surface has an albedo between 0.037 and 0.051. The Collaborative Asteroid Lightcurve Link derives an albedo of 0.046 and a diameter of 19.60 kilometers based on an absolute magnitude of 12.5.

== Naming ==
The minor planet was named in memory of Finnish scientist Henrik Johan Walbeck (1793–1822), astronomer and geodesist at the old Academia Aboensis who used the method of least squares to derive a good value for the Earth's flattening. The official naming citation was published by the Minor Planet Center on 1 April 1980 (M.P.C. 5281).
