= 1680 Per Brahe =

Asteroid

Discovery
- Discovered by: L. Oterma
- Discovery site: Turku Obs.
- Discovery date: 12 February 1942

Designations
- Named after: Per Brahe the Younger (Count and Governor)
- Alternative designations: 1942 CH · 1934 PP; 1937 AA · 1937 AY; 1938 JA · 1943 PC; 1949 XL · 1952 OG; 1953 VD_{1} · 1960 FF; A902 JA
- Minor planet category: main-belt · (middle) background

Orbital characteristics
- Epoch 27 April 2019 (JD 2458600.5)
- Uncertainty parameter 0
- Observation arc: 117.28 yr (42,838 d)
- Aphelion: 3.2227 AU
- Perihelion: 2.2278 AU
- Semi-major axis: 2.7252 AU
- Eccentricity: 0.1825
- Orbital period (sidereal): 4.50 yr (1,643 d)
- Mean anomaly: 349.62°
- Mean motion: 0° 13^{m} 8.76^{s} / day
- Inclination: 4.2614°
- Longitude of ascending node: 83.344°
- Argument of perihelion: 158.68°

Physical characteristics
- Mean diameter: 13.960±0.125 km 14.20±0.8 km 14.848±0.130 km 15.45±1.32 km 18.29±0.70 km
- Synodic rotation period: 3.426±0.002 h 3.428±0.002 h
- Geometric albedo: 0.178±0.015; 0.2722±0.0223; 0.2903±0.038; 0.300±0.044; 0.407±0.294
- Spectral type: SMASS = S
- Absolute magnitude (H): 10.65; 11.1; 11.2

1680 Per Brahe, provisional designation 1942 CH, is a bright background asteroid from the central region of the asteroid belt, approximately 14 kilometers (9 miles) in diameter. It was discovered on 12 February 1942, by Finnish astronomer Liisi Oterma at Turku Observatory in Southwest Finland. The stony S-type asteroid has a rotation period of 3.4 hours. It is named after Swedish count and governor Per Brahe the Younger.

== Orbit and classification ==
The S-type asteroid is a non-family asteroid of the main belt's background population. It orbits the Sun in the central main-belt at a distance of 2.2–3.2 AU once every 4 years and 6 months (1,643 days; semi-major axis of 2.73 AU). Its orbit has an eccentricity of 0.18 and an inclination of 4° with respect to the ecliptic. Per Brahe was first identified as A902 JA at Heidelberg Observatory in 1902, extending the asteroid's observation arc by 40 years prior to its official discovery observation.

== Naming ==
This minor planet was named for Swedish count Per Brahe (1602–1680), who was Governor General of Finland in the 17th century. His prosperous legacy saw the establishment of Academia Aboensis, the first university in Finland, the construction of various new towns and many schools, and the publication of the first Finnish Bible. The official naming citation was published by the Minor Planet Center on 1 April 1980 (M.P.C. 5280).

== Physical characteristics ==
=== Lightcurve ===
In December 2012, two rotational lightcurves of Per Brahe were obtained by American astronomers Robert Stephens and Brian Warner. They gave a well-defined rotation period of 3.426 and 3.428 hours with a brightness variation of 0.13 and 0.017 magnitude, respectively (U=3/3). Previously, lightcurves obtained by Laurent Bernasconi and René Roy in 2005 and 2006, gave a similar period of 3.444 and 3.44 hours, respectively.(U=2/1+).

=== Diameter and albedo ===
According to the surveys carried out by the Infrared Astronomical Satellite IRAS, the Japanese Akari satellite, and NASA's Wide-field Infrared Survey Explorer with its subsequent NEOWISE mission, Per Brahe measures between 13.96 and 18.29 kilometers in diameter, and its surface has an albedo between 0.178 and 0.300. The Collaborative Asteroid Lightcurve Link derives a higher albedo of 0.341 and a diameter of 14.36 kilometers with an absolute magnitude of 11.0.
