= Henrik Johan Walbeck =

Finnish geodesist and astronomer

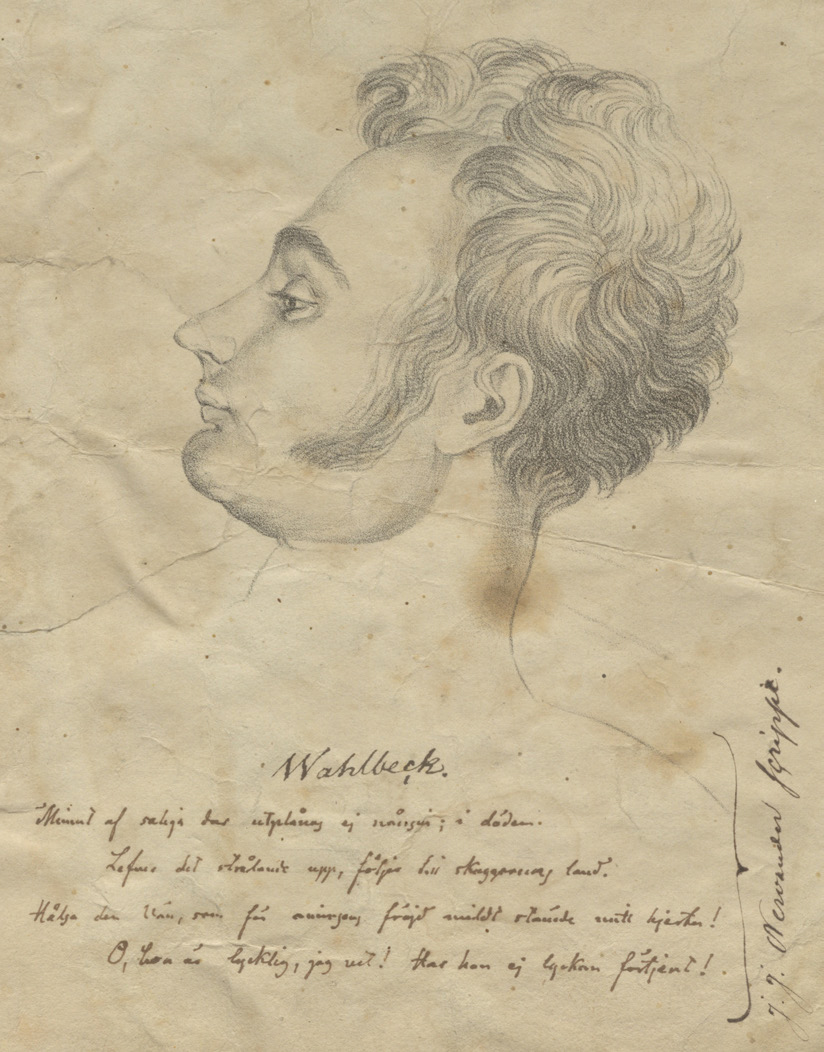
H. J. Walbeck as drawn by Gustaf Wilhelm Finnberg shortly after his death.

Henrik Johan Walbeck (11 October 1793 – 23 October 1822) was a Finnish geodesist and astronomer who studied the size and figure of the Earth by means of arc measurements.

Walbeck was born in Turku (Åbo). In 1817, he was made a corresponding member of the Royal Swedish Academy of Sciences and, in 1820, of the Royal Astronomical Society and the Mathematische Gesellschaft in Hamburg. He committed suicide in 1822, also in Åbo.

The asteroid 1695 Walbeck is named after him.
