= Levelling refraction =

Error in surveying of Earth's surface due to atmospheric effects

In geodesy and surveying, levelling refraction is the systematic refraction effect distorting the results of line levelling over the Earth's surface.

In line levelling, short segments of a line are levelled by taking readings through a level from two staffs, one fore and one behind. By chaining together the height differences of these segments, one can compute the total height difference between the end points of a line.

The classical work on levelling refraction is that of Finnish geodesist TJ Kukkamäki in 1938–39. His analysis is based upon the understanding that the measurement beams travel within a boundary layer close to the Earth's surface, which behaves differently from the atmosphere at large. When measuring over a tilted surface, the systematic effect accumulates.

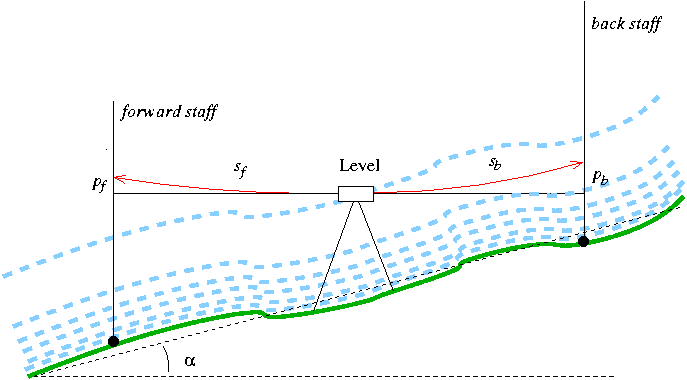
The systematic effect of levelling refraction on sloping terrain

The Kukkamäki levelling refraction became notorious as the explanation of the "Palmdale Bulge", which geodesists observed in California in the 1970s.

Levelling refraction can be eliminated by either of two techniques:

1. Measuring the vertical temperature gradient within the atmospheric boundary layer. Typically two temperature-dependent resistors are used, one at 50 cm (20 in), the other at 250 cm (98 in) height above the ground, mounted on a staff and connected in a Wheatstone bridge.
2. Using climatological modelling. Depending on the time of day and year, geographical location and general weather conditions, also levelling observations can be approximately corrected for which no original temperature gradient measurements were collected.

An alternative, hi-tech approach is dispersometry using two different wavelengths of light. Only recently blue lasers have become readily available making this a realistic proposition.
