= 1504 Lappeenranta =

Main-belt asteroid

Discovery
- Discovered by: L. Oterma
- Discovery site: Turku Obs.
- Discovery date: 23 March 1939

Designations
- Named after: Lappeenranta (Finnish city)
- Alternative designations: 1939 FM
- Minor planet category: main-belt · (inner) background

Orbital characteristics
- Epoch 4 September 2017 (JD 2458000.5)
- Uncertainty parameter 0
- Observation arc: 78.15 yr (28,544 days)
- Aphelion: 2.7784 AU
- Perihelion: 2.0207 AU
- Semi-major axis: 2.3995 AU
- Eccentricity: 0.1579
- Orbital period (sidereal): 3.72 yr (1,358 days)
- Mean anomaly: 67.942°
- Mean motion: 0° 15^{m} 54.72^{s} / day
- Inclination: 11.049°
- Longitude of ascending node: 94.866°
- Argument of perihelion: 51.074°

Physical characteristics
- Dimensions: 11.336±0.149 km 11.931±0.069 km 12.42±0.48 km 12.65 km (derived); 12.70±1.2 km 13.35±2.34 km
- Synodic rotation period: 8 h (dated); 10.44 h 15.16±0.01 h 15.190±0.009 h (Note: Garlitz (2013) web: observations from February 2013 gave a rotation period 15.190±0.009 hours with a brightness amplitude of 0.22 mag. Summary figures for (1504) Lappeenranta at LCDB)
- Geometric albedo: 0.1765 (derived); 0.1939±0.042; 0.1997±0.0312; 0.213±0.020; 0.270±0.034; 0.434±0.184
- Spectral type: Tholen = S · S B–V = 0.880; U–B = 0.418
- Absolute magnitude (H): 10.90 · 11.47±0.32 · 11.88 · 11.99

1504 Lappeenranta (provisional designation 1939 FM) is a stony background asteroid from the inner regions of the asteroid belt, approximately 12 kilometers in diameter. It was discovered on 23 March 1939, by Finnish astronomer Liisi Oterma at the Iso-Heikkilä Observatory, and named after the city of Lappeenranta in Finland.

== Orbit and classification ==
Lappeenranta is a non-family asteroid from the main belt's background population. It orbits the Sun in the inner asteroid belt at a distance of 2.0–2.8 AU once every 3 years and 9 months (1,358 days). Its orbit has an eccentricity of 0.16 and an inclination of 11° with respect to the ecliptic. The body's observation arc begins four nights prior to its official discovery observation at Turku.

== Physical characteristics ==
In the Tholen classification, Lappeenranta is a common S-type asteroid. Pan-STARRS photometric survey has also characterized it as an S-type.

=== Rotation period ===
Lappeenranta has an ambiguous rotation period. Recent photometric observations gave a period of 15.16 and 15.190 hours with a brightness variation of 0.09 and 0.22 magnitude, respectively (U=2/2+), while Richard Binzel obtained a period of 10.44 hours and an amplitude of 0.29 magnitude in the mid-1980s (U=2). An alternative period of 8 hours, which was measured by Laurent Bernasconi and Fernand van den Abbeel (2002) as well as by René Roy (2006), has been superseded (U=1/1).

=== Diameter and albedo ===
According to the surveys carried out by the Infrared Astronomical Satellite IRAS, the Japanese Akari satellite and the NEOWISE mission of NASA's Wide-field Infrared Survey Explorer, Lappeenranta measures between 11.336 and 13.35 kilometers in diameter and its surface has an albedo between 0.1939 and 0.434.

The Collaborative Asteroid Lightcurve Link derives an albedo of 0.1765 and a diameter of 12.65 kilometers based on an absolute magnitude of 11.99.

== Naming ==
This minor planet was named after the city of Lappeenranta in southeastern Finland. The official naming citation was published by the Minor Planet Center on 20 February 1976 (M.P.C. 3928).
