= Zdeněk Moravec =

Czech astronomer

Minor planets discovered: 93
see § List of discovered minor planets

Zdeněk Moravec (born 1968) is a Czech astronomer and astrophysicist.

Zdeněk Moravec is a graduate from Charles University in Prague. He became a prolific discoverer of minor planets, during his stay at the Kleť Observatory in South Bohemia, Czech Republic, from 1992 to 2000. He is credited by the Minor Planet Center with a total of 93 discovered bodies (between 1994 and 1998), of which 65 were co-discoveries together with astronomer Miloš Tichý. In March 2008 they discovered the minor planet 17805 Švestka at the Kleť Observatory, which they named it in honor of solar physicist Zdeněk Švestka.

Since 2001, he teaches theoretic physics and computer modelling at Jan Evangelista Purkyně University in Ústí nad Labem, Czech Republic.

== List of discovered minor planets ==
6801 Střekov	October 22, 1995	list
7495 Feynman	November 22, 1995	list^{[A]}
7498 Blaník	January 16, 1996	list
7669 Malše	August 4, 1995	list^{[A]}
7671 Albis	October 22, 1995	list
7711 Říp	December 2, 1994	list
7796 Járacimrman	January 16, 1996	list
7896 Švejk	March 1, 1995	list
7967 Beny	February 28, 1996	list
8048 Andrle	February 22, 1995	list^{[A]}
8222 Gellner	July 22, 1996	list^{[A]}
8556 Jana	July 7, 1995	list
8573 Ivanka	November 4, 1996	list
8740 Václav	January 12, 1998	list^{[A]}
9102 Foglar	December 12, 1996	list^{[A]}
9224 Železný	January 10, 1996	list^{[A]}
9884 Příbram	October 12, 1994	list^{[A]}
9991 Anežka	October 5, 1997	list
10170 Petrjakeš	February 22, 1995	list^{[A]}
10174 Emička	May 2, 1995	list
10205 Pokorný	August 7, 1997	list^{[A]}
10213 Koukolík	September 10, 1997	list^{[A]}
11124 Mikulášek	October 14, 1996	list^{[A]}
11134 České Budějovice	December 4, 1996	list^{[A]}
11163 Milešovka	February 4, 1998	list

11339 Orlík	November 13, 1996	list^{[A]}
(11603) 1995 TF	October 5, 1995	list
11656 Lipno	March 6, 1997	list^{[A]}
12406 Zvíkov	September 25, 1995	list^{[A]}
12448 Mr. Tompkins	December 12, 1996	list^{[A]}
13681 Monty Python	August 7, 1997	list^{[A]}
13804 Hrazany	December 9, 1998	list^{[A]}
14054 Dušek	January 12, 1996	list^{[A]}
14190 Soldán	December 15, 1998	list^{[A]}
14206 Sehnal	February 15, 1999	list^{[A]}
(14532) 1997 QM	August 25, 1997	list
14537 Týn nad Vltavou	September 10, 1997	list^{[A]}
15374 Teta	January 16, 1997	list^{[A]}
15890 Prachatice	April 3, 1997	list^{[A]}
15960 Hluboká	February 2, 1998	list^{[A]}
16781 Renčín	December 12, 1996	list^{[A]}
17607 Táborsko	October 2, 1995	list^{[A]}
17694 Jiránek	March 4, 1997	list^{[A]}
17805 Švestka	March 30, 1998	list^{[A]}
18497 Nevězice	June 11, 1996	list^{[A]}
18531 Strakonice	December 4, 1996	list^{[A]}
20364 Zdeněkmiler	May 20, 1998	list^{[A]}
21290 Vydra	November 9, 1996	list^{[A]}
21602 Ialmenus	December 17, 1998	list^{[A]}
22465 Karelanděl	January 15, 1997	list^{[A]}

22503 Thalpius	October 7, 1997	list^{[A]}
24950 Nikhilas	August 23, 1997	list
(24951) 1997 QK	August 24, 1997	list
25340 Segoves	September 10, 1999	list^{[A]}
26328 Litomyšl	November 18, 1998	list^{[A]}
26971 Sezimovo Ústí	September 25, 1997	list^{[A]}
(27956) 1997 RC	September 1, 1997	list
29401 Asterix	October 1, 1996	list^{[A]}
29402 Obelix	October 14, 1996	list^{[A]}
29555 MACEK	February 18, 1998	list^{[A]}
31092 Carolowilhelmina	February 6, 1997	list^{[A]}
31109 Janpalous	August 14, 1997	list^{[A]}
(31114) 1997 QB_{1}	August 28, 1997	list
35239 Ottoseydl	September 25, 1995	list^{[A]}
(35445) 1998 CY	February 5, 1998	list^{[A]}
43954 Chýnov	February 7, 1997	list^{[A]}
43971 Gabzdyl	April 8, 1997	list^{[A]}
44000 Lucka	September 1, 1997	list
(44031) 1998 CO	February 3, 1998	list^{[A]}
(48775) 1997 QL	August 24, 1997	list
(48776) 1997 QT	August 27, 1997	list
48844 Belloves	February 18, 1998	list^{[A]}
(52591) 1997 QD	August 22, 1997	list
58424 Jamesdunlop	February 22, 1996	list^{[A]}
(58567) 1997 QB	August 21, 1997	list

(58568) 1997 QM_{1}	August 31, 1997	list
(65895) 1998 CP	February 3, 1998	list^{[A]}
(69553) 1997 QS_{2}	August 31, 1997	list
(79477) 1998 CN	February 3, 1998	list^{[A]}
(85328) 1995 PA	August 1, 1995	list^{[A]}
91006 Fleming	January 28, 1998	list^{[A]}
(100719) 1998 BU_{26}	January 29, 1998	list^{[A]}
100728 Kamenice n Lipou	February 2, 1998	list^{[A]}
(100729) 1998 CX	February 5, 1998	list^{[A]}
(118243) 1997 QL_{1}	August 30, 1997	list
(118254) 1998 CU	February 4, 1998	list^{[A]}
(120580) 1995 SF	September 17, 1995	list
145768 Petiška	August 12, 1997	list^{[A]}
(152660) 1998 CW	February 5, 1998	list^{[A]}
(159380) 1998 CV	February 4, 1998	list^{[A]}
(160027) 1997 UN_{1}	October 23, 1997	list^{[A]}
(231698) 1998 QC_{2}	August 19, 1998	list^{[A]}
(275528) 1998 CM	February 3, 1998	list^{[A]}
(285226) 1997 QU_{2}	August 31, 1997	list
Co-discovery made with:^{A} Miloš Tichý

== See also ==
- 9991 Anežka
- 15374 Teta
- 43954 Chýnov
- Category:Discoveries by Zdeněk Moravec
