= 1544 Vinterhansenia =

Main-belt asteroid

Discovery
- Discovered by: L. Oterma
- Discovery site: Turku Obs.
- Discovery date: 15 October 1941

Designations
- Named after: Julie Vinter Hansen (astronomer)
- Alternative designations: 1941 UK · 1928 DO; 1937 RK · 1939 CL; 1948 QT · 1974 YB; A906 DB · A919 UB
- Minor planet category: main-belt · (inner)

Orbital characteristics
- Epoch 4 September 2017 (JD 2458000.5)
- Uncertainty parameter 0
- Observation arc: 111.12 yr (40,586 days)
- Aphelion: 2.6230 AU
- Perihelion: 2.1227 AU
- Semi-major axis: 2.3729 AU
- Eccentricity: 0.1054
- Orbital period (sidereal): 3.66 yr (1,335 days)
- Mean anomaly: 251.35°
- Mean motion: 0° 16^{m} 10.56^{s} / day
- Inclination: 3.3342°
- Longitude of ascending node: 59.973°
- Argument of perihelion: 356.51°

Physical characteristics
- Dimensions: 20.76±2.50 km 21.63 km (derived); 21.71±1.5 km 24.29±6.90 km 24.561±0.080 km 26.230±0.201 km
- Synodic rotation period: 13.7±0.1 h 13.77±0.01 h
- Geometric albedo: 0.0404±0.0052; 0.046±0.041; 0.058±0.007; 0.0599 (derived); 0.06±0.01; 0.0784±0.012
- Spectral type: X · C
- Absolute magnitude (H): 11.7 · 12.0 · 12.02 · 12.05 · 12.06±0.25

1544 Vinterhansenia (provisional designation 1941 UK) is a dark asteroid from the inner regions of the asteroid belt, approximately 22 kilometers in diameter. It was discovered on 15 October 1941, by Finnish astronomer Liisi Oterma at Turku Observatory in Southwest Finland, and named for Danish astronomer Julie Vinter Hansen.

== Orbit and classification ==
Vinterhansenia is classified as both C-type and X-type asteroid. It orbits the Sun in the inner main-belt at a distance of 2.1–2.6 AU once every 3 years and 8 months (1,335 days). Its orbit has an eccentricity of 0.11 and an inclination of 3° with respect to the ecliptic. Vinterhansenia was first identified as A906 DB at Heidelberg Observatory in 1906. Its first used observation, 1928 DO, was also taken at Heidelberg in 1928, and extends the body's observation arc by 13 years prior to its official discovery observation at Turku in 1941.

== Lightcurves ==
Two rotational lightcurves of Vinterhansenia were obtained from photometric observations taken by Kevin Ivarsen in October 2003, and Laurent Bernasconi in March 2005. Lightcurve analysis gave a rotation period of 13.7 and 13.77 hours with a brightness variation of 0.15 and 0.18 magnitude, respectively (U=2/2).

== Diameter and albedo ==
According to the space-based surveys carried out by the Infrared Astronomical Satellite IRAS, and NASA's Wide-field Infrared Survey Explorer with its subsequent NEOWISE mission, Vinterhansenia measures between 20.76 and 26.23 kilometers in diameter, and its surface has an albedo between 0.040 and 0.078. The Collaborative Asteroid Lightcurve Link assumes an albedo of 0.0599 and a diameter of 21.63 kilometers with an absolute magnitude of 12.0.

== Naming ==
This minor planet was named for Danish astronomer Julie Vinter Hansen (1890–1960), who worked at the Copenhagen Observatory and was director of the International Astronomical Union's telegram bureau and Editor of its Circulars (also see Central Bureau for Astronomical Telegrams) The official naming citation was published by the Minor Planet Center in January 1956 (M.P.C. 1350).
