= Erik Tengström =

Swedish astronomer and geodeist (1913–1996)

Erik Tengström (1913–1996), Swedish astronomer and geodesist.

Tengström was born in Motala, Sweden, and was a descendant of the first archbishop of Åbo Jacob Tengström. He enrolled in Stockholm University in 1932, where he studied astronomy, physics and geology. After teaching at the Royal Institute of Technology in Stockholm and while working as state geodesist at the Geographical Survey Office of Sweden (Rikets allmänna kartverk; RAK) 1949-1954, he completed his Licentiate in 1952 and his PhD in geodesy at Uppsala University in 1954 with the dissertation Outlines of a method for determining the geoid in Sweden by free-air anomalies (published in Stockholm, also as Rikets allmänna kartverk. Meddelande. 22). He produced about 60 scientific reports and articles.

He taught in Uppsala from 1954, was a researcher with the Swedish Natural Science Research Council from 1962, established the Uppsala Department of Geodesy the same year, and was given a research professorship in 1968. For his 70th birthday he was given the festschrift Commemorative volume on the occasion of Erik Tengström's 70th birthday (Report / Department of Geodesy, University of Uppsala, Institute of Geophysics, ISSN 0281-4463; 19).

The Florian asteroid 2195 Tengström, discovered by Liisi Oterma at Turku Observatory in Finland, was named in his honour.
