= 15374 Teta =

Main-belt asteroid

Discovery
- Discovered by: M. Tichý; Z. Moravec
- Discovery site: Kleť Obs.
- Discovery date: 16 January 1997

Designations
- Named after: Teta (Czech mythology)
- Alternative designations: 1997 BG
- Minor planet category: main-belt · (inner); Hungaria

Orbital characteristics
- Epoch 4 September 2017 (JD 2458000.5)
- Uncertainty parameter 0
- Observation arc: 66.81 yr (24,402 days)
- Aphelion: 2.3153 AU
- Perihelion: 1.6709 AU
- Semi-major axis: 1.9931 AU
- Eccentricity: 0.1616
- Orbital period (sidereal): 2.81 yr (1,028 days)
- Mean anomaly: 288.11°
- Mean motion: 0° 21^{m} 1.08^{s} / day
- Inclination: 32.400°
- Longitude of ascending node: 131.97°
- Argument of perihelion: 190.33°

Physical characteristics
- Dimensions: 3.35 km (calculated)
- Synodic rotation period: 2.820±0.005 h 2.8204±0.0005 h
- Geometric albedo: 0.30 (assumed)
- Spectral type: E/S
- Absolute magnitude (H): 14.3 · 14.44±0.30

15374 Teta (provisional designation 1997 BG) is bright, stony Hungaria asteroid from the inner regions of the asteroid belt, about 3.3 kilometers in diameter. It was discovered by Czech astronomers Miloš Tichý and Zdeněk Moravec at Kleť Observatory in South Bohemia on 16 January 1997. It is named after Teta from Czech mythology.

== Orbit and classification ==
Teta is a bright E-type asteroid and member of the Hungaria family, which form the innermost dense concentration of asteroids in the Solar System. It orbits the Sun in the inner main-belt at a distance of 1.7–2.3 astronomical units once every 2 years and 10 months (1,028 days). Its orbit has an eccentricity of 0.16 and an inclination of 32° with respect to the ecliptic. A first precovery was obtained during Digitized Sky Survey at Palomar Observatory in 1950, extending the body's observation arc by 47 years prior to its discovery.

== Physical characteristics ==
In 2014, an improved rotational lightcurve of Teta was obtained by American astronomer Brian Warner at his Palmer Divide Observatory in Colorado. Lightcurve analysis gave a rotation period of 2.820±0.005 hours with a brightness amplitude of 0.30 magnitude (U=3-).

The Collaborative Asteroid Lightcurve Link assumes an albedo of 0.30 – a compromise value between 0.4 and 0.2, corresponding to the Hungaria asteroids both as family and orbital group – and calculates a diameter of 3.35 kilometers using an absolute magnitude of 14.4.

== Naming ==
This minor planet was named from Czech mythology after "Teta", the fortune-teller, heathen priestess, and member of the Přemyslid dynasty. She is the second daughter of Duke Krok and sister of Libuše, who, according to legend, founded the city of Prague (also see 2367 Praha) in the 8th century, and after whom the minor planets 264 Libussa and 3102 Krok were named, respectively. The approved naming citation was published by the Minor Planet Center on 11 November 2000 (M.P.C. 41573).
