= 2195 Tengström =

Stony Florian asteroid from the inner regions of the asteroid belt

Discovery
- Discovered by: L. Oterma
- Discovery site: Turku Obs.
- Discovery date: 27 September 1941

Designations
- Named after: Erik Tengström (Swedish geodesist)
- Alternative designations: 1941 SP_{1} · 1931 TC_{3} 1934 PQ · 1936 DF; 1943 GT · 1944 QD; 1951 VA · 1973 GC_{1} 1974 RC_{2} · 1976 GO_{4}
- Minor planet category: main-belt · Flora

Orbital characteristics
- Epoch 4 September 2017 (JD 2458000.5)
- Uncertainty parameter 0
- Observation arc: 85.57 yr (31,253 days)
- Aphelion: 2.4574 AU
- Perihelion: 1.9861 AU
- Semi-major axis: 2.2217 AU
- Eccentricity: 0.1061
- Orbital period (sidereal): 3.31 yr (1,210 days)
- Mean anomaly: 317.69°
- Mean motion: 0° 17^{m} 51.36^{s} / day
- Inclination: 4.5747°
- Longitude of ascending node: 100.96°
- Argument of perihelion: 295.55°

Physical characteristics
- Dimensions: 7.14±1.13 km 7.17±0.41 km 8.627±0.060 km 8.732±0.044 km 8.98 km (calculated)
- Synodic rotation period: 2.816±0.003 h 2.82±0.05 h 2.82092±0.00004 h (Note: Pravec (2011) web: rotation period 2.82092±0.00004 hours; amplitude of 0.31 mag.; quality code of 3. Summary figures for (2195) Tengström at Collaborative Asteroid Lightcurve Link (CALL) and Pravec, P.; Wolf, M.; Sarounova, L. (2011)); 2.8210±0.0001 h (Note: Pravec (2016) web: rotation period 2.8210±0.0001 hours; amplitude of 0.21 mag.; quality code of 3. Summary figures for (2195) Tengström at Collaborative Asteroid Lightcurve Link (CALL) and Pravec, P.; Wolf, M.; Sarounova, L. (2016)); 2.8211±0.0001 h 2.82112±0.00007 h (Note: Higgins (2011) web: rotation period 2.82112±0.00007 hours; amplitude of 0.17 mag.; quality code of 3. Summary figures for (2195) Tengström at Collaborative Asteroid Lightcurve Link (CALL)); 2.82117±0.00005 h 2.829±0.0007 h
- Geometric albedo: 0.24 (assumed); 0.3361±0.0301; 0.343±0.051; 0.39±0.15; 0.453±0.106
- Spectral type: M · S
- Absolute magnitude (H): 12.1 · 12.20 · 12.237±0.001 (R) · 12.27±0.23 · 12.30 · 12.4

2195 Tengström, provisional designation 1941 SP_{1}, is a stony Florian asteroid from the inner regions of the asteroid belt, approximately 8 kilometers in diameter. It was discovered on 27 September 1941, by Finnish astronomer Liisi Oterma at Turku Observatory in Southwest Finland, and named for Swedish geodesist Erik Tengström.

== Orbit and classification ==
Tengström is a member of the Flora family of stony asteroids, one of the largest families of the main belt. It orbits the Sun in the inner main-belt at a distance of 2.0–2.5 AU once every 3 years and 4 months (1,210 days). Its orbit has an eccentricity of 0.11 and an inclination of 5° with respect to the ecliptic. It was first identified as 1931 TC_{3} at Lowell Observatory in 1931, extending the asteroid's observation arc by 10 years prior to its official discovery observation at Turku.

== Physical characteristics ==
Tengström has been characterized as a metallic M-type and stony S-type asteroid.

=== Rotation period ===
Between 2006 and 2016, several well defined rotational lightcurves of Tengström were obtained by astronomers David Higgins, Petr Pravec, Pierre Antonini and René Roy (U=3/3/3/3/3). Lightcurve analysis gave a rotation period of 2.821 hours with a brightness variation between 0.17 and 0.45 magnitude. (Note: Lightcurve plot from December 2011, 2.82092 hours and April 2016, 2.8210 hours by Pray, Kusnirak, Pravec Ondřejov Observatory – unpublished data) For an asteroid of its size, Tengström has a relatively fast spin rate, not far from the 2.2-hour threshold for fast rotators.

=== Diameter and albedo ===
According to the survey carried out by NASA's Wide-field Infrared Survey Explorer with its subsequent NEOWISE mission, Tengström measures between 7.14 and 8.73 kilometers in diameter and its surface has a high albedo of 0.34 to 0.45. NEOWISE also classifies it as a metallic asteroid, despite its much higher albedo. The Collaborative Asteroid Lightcurve Link assumes an albedo of 0.24 – derived from 8 Flora, the family's largest member and namesake – and calculates a diameter of 8.98 kilometers using an absolute magnitude of 12.4.

== Naming ==
This minor planet was named after Swedish geodesist and astronomer Erik Tengström (1913–1996), emeritus professor at Uppsala University on the celebration of his 70th anniversary. The official naming citation was published by the Minor Planet Center on 28 March 1983 (M.P.C. 7782).
