= 825 Tanina =

Stony background asteroid

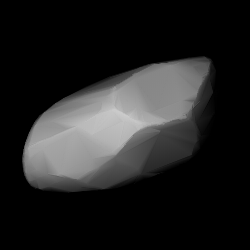
- Modelled shape of Tanina from its lightcurve

Discovery
- Discovered by: G. Neujmin
- Discovery site: Simeiz Obs.
- Discovery date: 27 March 1916

Designations
- Named after: unknown
- Alternative designations: A916 FH · A904 UB; 1916 ZL · 1904 UB
- Minor planet category: main-belt · (inner); Bg · Flora

Orbital characteristics
- Epoch 31 May 2020 (JD 2459000.5)
- Uncertainty parameter 0
- Observation arc: 114.92 yr (41,974 d)
- Aphelion: 2.3937 AU
- Perihelion: 2.0578 AU
- Semi-major axis: 2.2257 AU
- Eccentricity: 0.0755
- Orbital period (sidereal): 3.32 yr (1,213 d)
- Mean anomaly: 112.91°
- Mean motion: 0° 17^{m} 48.48^{s} / day
- Inclination: 3.3998°
- Longitude of ascending node: 101.41°
- Argument of perihelion: 111.50°

Physical characteristics
- Mean diameter: 11.02±0.7 km; 13.06±0.38 km; 13.423±0.150 km
- Synodic rotation period: 6.940±0.001 h
- Pole ecliptic latitude: (46.0°, 48.0°) (λ_{1}/β_{1}); (231.0°, 60.0°) (λ_{2}/β_{2})
- Geometric albedo: 0.181±0.042; 0.2624±0.038; 0.278±0.018
- Spectral type: Tholen = SR; SMASS = S; B–V = 0.912±0.041; U–B = 0.525±0.089
- Absolute magnitude (H): 11.4

825 Tanina (prov. designation: A916 FH or 1916 ZL) is a stony background asteroid from the region of the Flora family, located in the inner part of the asteroid belt. It was discovered on 27 March 1916, by Russian astronomer Grigory Neujmin at the Simeiz Observatory on Crimea. The elongated S-type asteroid (SR) has a rotation period of 6.9 hours and measures approximately 13 kilometers (8.1 miles) in diameter. Any reference of the asteroid's name to a person is unknown.

== Orbit and classification ==
Tanina is a non-family asteroid of the main belt's background population when applying the hierarchical clustering method (HCM) by Nesvorný to its proper orbital elements. In the 1995 HCM-analysis by Zappalà, however, Tanina is a member of the Flora family (402), a giant asteroid family and the largest family of stony asteroids in the main-belt. In the HCM-analysis by Milani and Knežević (AstDys), it is also a background asteroid as this analysis does not recognize the Flora asteroid clan. The asteroid orbits the Sun in the inner main-belt at a distance of 2.1–2.4 AU once every 3 years and 4 months (1,213 days; semi-major axis of 2.23 AU). Its orbit has an eccentricity of 0.08 and an inclination of 3° with respect to the ecliptic.

== Discovery ==
Tanina was discovered by Russian astronomer Grigory Neujmin at the Simeiz Observatory on Crimean peninsula on 27 March 1916. One week later, on 3 April 1916, it was independently discovered by Max Wolf at the Heidelberg Observatory in Germany. The Minor Planet Center only recognizes the first discoverer. The asteroid was first observed as A904 UB at Heidelberg on 17 October 1904, while the body's observation arc begins with Wolf's independent discovery observation.

== Naming ==
This minor planet was named "Tanina". Any reference of its name to a person or occurrence is unknown.

=== Unknown meaning ===
Among the many thousands of named minor planets, Tanina is one of 120 asteroids for which no official naming citation has been published. All of these asteroids have low numbers, the first one being 164 Eva. The last asteroid with a name of unknown meaning is 1514 Ricouxa. They were discovered between 1876 and the 1930s, predominantly by astronomers Auguste Charlois, Johann Palisa, Max Wolf and Karl Reinmuth.

== Physical characteristics ==
In the Tholen classification, Tanina is closest to a stony S-type asteroid, and somewhat similar to an uncommon R-type asteroid, while in the SMASS classification by Bus–Binzel, Tanina is a common S-type asteroid.

=== Rotation period ===
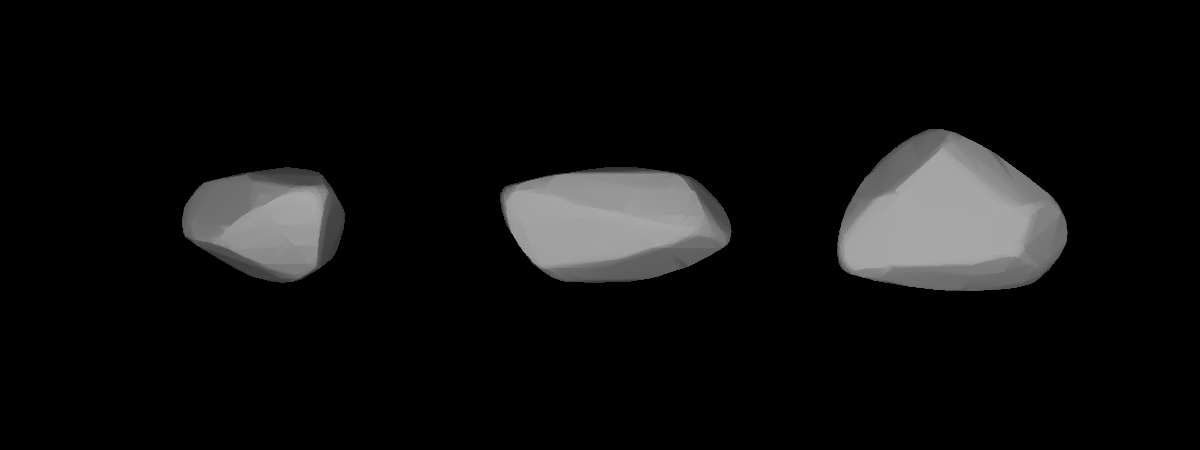
Lightcurve-based 3D-model of Tanina

In February 2002, a rotational lightcurve of Tanina was obtained from photometric observations by Italian astronomer Andrea Ferrero at the Bigmuskie Observatory (B88). Lightcurve analysis gave a well-defined rotation period of 6.940±0.001 hours with a high brightness variation of 0.54±0.03 magnitude, indicative of an elongated, non-spherical shape (U=3). The result supersedes previous period determinations of 6.746±0.001 hours with an amplitude of 0.48±0.02 magnitude (U=2) by Wiesław Z. Wiśniewski from February 1992, and 6.9398±0.0005 hours with an amplitude of 0.47±0.05 magnitude (U=2) by Agnieszka Kryszczyńska in May 1999. In 2011, a modeled lightcurve using data from the Uppsala Asteroid Photometric Catalogue (UAPC) and other sources gave a sidereal period 6.93981±0.00005 hours, as well as two spin axes at (46.0°, 48.0°) and (231.0°, 60.0°) in ecliptic coordinates (λ, β).

=== Diameter and albedo ===
According to the surveys carried out by the Infrared Astronomical Satellite IRAS, and the Japanese Akari satellite, and the NEOWISE mission of NASA's Wide-field Infrared Survey Explorer (WISE), Tanina measures (11.02±0.7), (13.06±0.38) and (13.423±0.150) kilometers in diameter and its surface has an albedo of (0.2624±0.038), (0.278±0.018) and (0.181±0.042), respectively. The Collaborative Asteroid Lightcurve Link adopts an albedo of 0.1508 from Petr Pravec's revised WISE data, and takes a diameter of 14.67 kilometers based on an absolute magnitude of 11.84. Alternative mean-diameter measurements published by the WISE team include (12.690±0.350 km) and (14.611±0.068 km) with corresponding albedos of (0.275±0.042) and (0.1537±0.0333).
