= 10244 Thüringer Wald =

Asteroid

Discovery
- Discovered by: C. J. van Houten; I. van Houten-G. Tom Gehrels
- Discovery site: Palomar Obs.
- Discovery date: 26 September 1960

Designations
- Named after: Thuringian Forest (German mountain range)
- Alternative designations: 4668 P-L · 1990 TB_{14}
- Minor planet category: main-belt · (inner); Vesta

Orbital characteristics
- Epoch 23 March 2018 (JD 2458200.5)
- Uncertainty parameter 0
- Observation arc: 57.42 yr (20,973 d)
- Aphelion: 2.6482 AU
- Perihelion: 2.1598 AU
- Semi-major axis: 2.4040 AU
- Eccentricity: 0.1016
- Orbital period (sidereal): 3.73 yr (1,361 d)
- Mean anomaly: 109.85°
- Mean motion: 0° 15^{m} 51.84^{s} / day
- Inclination: 7.4739°
- Longitude of ascending node: 28.159°
- Argument of perihelion: 27.932°

Physical characteristics
- Mean diameter: 3.346±0.207 km
- Geometric albedo: 0.190±0.054
- Absolute magnitude (H): 14.6

10244 Thüringer Wald, provisional designation 4668 P-L, is a Vestian asteroid from the inner regions of the asteroid belt, approximately 3.3 kilometers (2.1 miles) in diameter. It was discovered on 26 September 1960, by Ingrid and Cornelis van Houten at Leiden, and Tom Gehrels at Palomar Observatory in California, United States. The asteroid was named after the Thuringian Forest, a German mountain range.

== Orbit and classification ==
Thüringer Wald is a member of the Vesta family (401). Vestian asteroids have a composition akin to cumulate eucrites (HED meteorites) and are thought to have originated deep within 4 Vesta's crust, possibly from the Rheasilvia crater, a large impact crater on its southern hemisphere near the South pole, formed as a result of a subcatastrophic collision. Vesta is the main belt's second-largest and second-most-massive body after Ceres.

Thüringer Wald orbits the Sun in the inner main-belt at a distance of 2.2–2.6 AU once every 3 years and 9 months (1,361 days; semi-major axis of 2.4 AU). Its orbit has an eccentricity of 0.10 and an inclination of 7° with respect to the ecliptic. Its observation arc begins with its official discovery observation at Palomar in September 1960.

== Physical characteristics ==
The asteroid's spectral type is unknown. Vestian asteroids typically have a V- or S-type, with albedos higher than measured by the WISE telescope (see below). It has an absolute magnitude of 14.6. As of 2018, no rotational lightcurve of Thüringer Wald has been obtained from photometric observations. The body's rotation period, pole and shape remain unknown.

=== Diameter and albedo ===
According to the survey carried out by the NEOWISE mission of NASA's WISE telescope, Thüringer Wald measures 3.346 kilometers in diameter and its surface has an albedo of 0.190.

=== Palomar–Leiden survey ===
The survey designation "P-L" stands for Palomar–Leiden, named after Palomar Observatory and Leiden Observatory, which collaborated on the fruitful Palomar–Leiden survey in the 1960s. Gehrels used Palomar's Samuel Oschin telescope (also known as the 48-inch Schmidt Telescope), and shipped the photographic plates to Ingrid and Cornelis van Houten at Leiden Observatory where astrometry was carried out. The trio are credited with the discovery of several thousand asteroid discoveries.

== Naming ==
This minor planet was named after the Thuringian Forest (German: Thüringer Wald), a mountain range in central Germany. The official naming citation was published by the Minor Planet Center on 1 May 2003 (M.P.C. 48390).
