= 1545 Thernöe =

Elongated main-belt asteroid

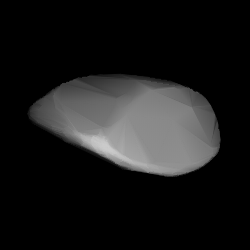
- Shape model of Thernöe from its lightcurve

Discovery
- Discovered by: L. Oterma
- Discovery site: Turku Obs.
- Discovery date: 15 October 1941

Designations
- Named after: Karl August Thernöe (Danish astronomer)
- Alternative designations: 1941 UW · 1932 YD; 1955 VV · 1957 HY; A906 FE · A915 CE
- Minor planet category: main-belt · (middle); background

Orbital characteristics
- Epoch 4 September 2017 (JD 2458000.5)
- Uncertainty parameter 0
- Observation arc: 111.21 yr (40,619 days)
- Aphelion: 3.4299 AU
- Perihelion: 2.1097 AU
- Semi-major axis: 2.7698 AU
- Eccentricity: 0.2383
- Orbital period (sidereal): 4.61 yr (1,684 days)
- Mean anomaly: 84.917°
- Mean motion: 0° 12^{m} 49.68^{s} / day
- Inclination: 2.9542°
- Longitude of ascending node: 51.800°
- Argument of perihelion: 90.542°

Physical characteristics
- Mean diameter: 16.12±5.02 km 17.796±0.210 km 18.656±0.376 km 18.71±1.1 km 19.37±0.31 km
- Synodic rotation period: 17.20±0.01 h 17.20321±0.0001 h
- Geometric albedo: 0.092±0.004; 0.0962±0.013; 0.097±0.012; 0.1063±0.0153; 0.13±0.10
- Spectral type: SMASS = K · C
- Absolute magnitude (H): 11.76 · 11.8 · 11.9 · 12.09±0.45

1545 Thernöe (provisional designation 1941 UW) is an elongated background asteroid from the central region of the asteroid belt. It was discovered on 15 October 1941, by Finnish astronomer Liisi Oterma at Turku Observatory in Southwest Finland. The uncommon K-type asteroid has a rotation period of 16.1 hours and measures approximately 18 kilometers (11 miles) in diameter. It was later named after Danish astronomer Karl August Thernöe.

== Orbit ==
Thernöe orbits the Sun in the central main-belt at a distance of 2.1–3.4 AU once every 4 years and 7 months (1,684 days). Its orbit has an eccentricity of 0.24 and an inclination of 3° with respect to the ecliptic. It was first identified as A906 FE at Heidelberg Observatory in 1906, extending the body's observation arc by 35 years prior to its official discovery observation at Turku.

== Naming ==
This minor planet was named after Karl August Thernöe (1911–1987), Danish astronomer and celestial mechanic at Østervold Observatory in Copenhagen. He was also a popularizer of astronomy and director of IAU's Central Bureau for Astronomical Telegrams during 1950–1964. The official naming citation was published by the Minor Planet Center on 20 February 1976 (M.P.C. 3930).

== Physical characteristics ==
=== Spectral type ===
In the SMASS taxonomy, Thernöe is classified as a rare K-type asteroid, a newly introduced subtype that belongs to the broader S-complex of stony bodies. Conversely, CALL groups Thernöe into the carbonaceous C-complex.

=== Rotation period and pole ===
In December 2006, a rotational lightcurve of Thernöe was obtained from photometric observations by French amateur astronomer René Roy. Lightcurve analysis gave a well-defined rotation period of 17.20 hours with a brightness variation of 0.76 magnitude (U=3). The high lightcurve-amplitude of 0.76 indicates that the body has a non-spheroidal shape.

A 2016-published lightcurve, using modeled photometric data from the Lowell Photometric Database, gave a concurring period of 17.20321 hours, as well as a spin axis of (164.0°, −5.0°) in ecliptic coordinates (λ, β).

=== Diameter and albedo ===
According to the surveys carried out by the Infrared Astronomical Satellite IRAS, the Japanese Akari satellite, and NASA's Wide-field Infrared Survey Explorer with its subsequent NEOWISE mission, Thernöe measures between 16.12 and 19.37 kilometers in diameter and its surface has an albedo between 0.092 and 0.13. The Collaborative Asteroid Lightcurve Link (CALL) adopts the results obtained by IRAS, that is, an albedo of 0.0962 and diameter of 18.71 kilometers with an absolute magnitude of 11.8.
