= 2391 Tomita =

Inner main-belt asteroid

Discovery
- Discovered by: K. Reinmuth
- Discovery site: Heidelberg Obs.
- Discovery date: 9 January 1957

Designations
- Named after: Kōichirō Tomita (Japanese astronomer)
- Alternative designations: 1957 AA · 1929 VX; 1938 BF · 1942 DF; 1957 BA · 1977 KM; 1978 PA_{4} · 1980 DC_{6}
- Minor planet category: main-belt · Nysa–Polana complex

Orbital characteristics
- Epoch 4 September 2017 (JD 2458000.5)
- Uncertainty parameter 0
- Observation arc: 87.07 yr (31,804 days)
- Aphelion: 2.7676 AU
- Perihelion: 2.1141 AU
- Semi-major axis: 2.4408 AU
- Eccentricity: 0.1339
- Orbital period (sidereal): 3.81 yr (1,393 days)
- Mean anomaly: 345.07°
- Mean motion: 0° 15^{m} 30.6^{s} / day
- Inclination: 3.0111°
- Longitude of ascending node: 163.32°
- Argument of perihelion: 282.65°

Physical characteristics
- Dimensions: 9.17 km (calculated); 15.07±4.33 km 15.20±3.74 km 16.62±0.23 km 17.941±0.129; 19.412±0.175 km
- Synodic rotation period: 7.9533±0.0005 h (Note: Pravec (2013) web: lightcurve plot with a rotation period 7.9533±0.0005 hours with a brightness amplitude of 0.14 mag. Summary figures for (2391) Tomita at Collaborative Asteroid Lightcurve Link (CALL) and Pravec, P.; Wolf, M.; Sarounova, L. (2013)); 8.435±0.079 h (Note: Williams (2013) web: rotation period 8.435±0.079 hours with a brightness amplitude of 0.15 mag. Summary figures for (2391) Tomita at Collaborative Asteroid Lightcurve Link (CALL). Data by Williams, R. (2013), posted on CALL page.)
- Geometric albedo: 0.0321±0.0044; 0.06±0.03; 0.070±0.004; 0.07±0.07; 0.21 (assumed)
- Spectral type: S · C
- Absolute magnitude (H): 12.4 · 12.5 · 12.66 · 12.74±0.28

2391 Tomita, provisional designation 1957 AA, is an asteroid from the inner regions of the asteroid belt, approximately 15 kilometers in diameter. The asteroid was discovered on 9 January 1957, by German astronomer Karl Reinmuth at Heidelberg Observatory in southern Germany. It was named after Japanese astronomer Kōichirō Tomita.

== Orbit and classification ==
Tomita is a member of the Nysa–Polana complex, a collection of overlapping asteroid families. It orbits the Sun in the inner main-belt at a distance of 2.1–2.8 AU once every 3 years and 10 months (1,393 days). Its orbit has an eccentricity of 0.13 and an inclination of 3° with respect to the ecliptic.

A first precovery was taken at Lowell Observatory in 1929, extending the body's observation arc by 28 years prior to its official discovery observation at Heidelberg.

== Physical characteristics ==
Tomita has been characterized as a stony S-type asteroid by the Collaborative Asteroid Lightcurve Link (CALL), and as a carbonaceous C-type asteroid by Pan-STARRS' photometric survey.

=== Diameter and albedo ===
According to the surveys carried out by NASA's Wide-field Infrared Survey Explorer with its subsequent NEOWISE mission, the asteroid measures between 15.07 and 19.4 kilometers in diameter and its surface has a low albedo between 0.03 and 0.07, respectively.

As CALL considers the body to be of a stony composition, it assumes a much higher albedo of 0.21 and calculates a diameter of 9.2 kilometers, as the higher the asteroid's reflectivity (albedo), the shorter its diameter at a constant absolute magnitude (brightness).

=== Rotation period ===
In December 2013, two rotational lightcurves were obtained for this asteroid from photometric observations. They gave a rotation period of 7.9533±0.0005 and 8.435±0.079 hours with a brightness variation of 0.14 and 0.15 in magnitude, respectively. (U=3/n.a.).

== Naming ==
This minor planet was named in honor of Japanese astronomer Kōichirō Tomita (1925–2006), long-time observer at the Tokyo Astronomical Observatory, and a discoverer of minor planets and comets himself. Tomita was also known as one of Japan's principal popularizer of astronomy. The official naming citation was published by the Minor Planet Center on 14 April 1987 (M.P.C. 11748).
