= 6257 Thorvaldsen =

Main-belt asteroid

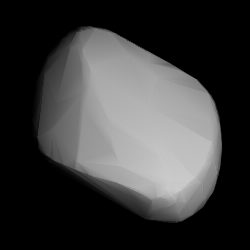
- Thorvaldsen modeled from its lightcurve

Discovery
- Discovered by: C. J. van Houten; I. van Houten-G. T. Gehrels
- Discovery site: Palomar Obs.
- Discovery date: 26 March 1971

Designations
- Named after: Bertel Thorvaldsen (Danish sculptor)
- Alternative designations: 4098 T-1 · 1969 TH_{2} 1978 ES_{5} · 1989 GB_{7}
- Minor planet category: main-belt · (inner); Vesta

Orbital characteristics
- Epoch 23 March 2018 (JD 2458200.5)
- Uncertainty parameter 0
- Observation arc: 48.54 yr (17,731 d)
- Aphelion: 2.5505 AU
- Perihelion: 2.1326 AU
- Semi-major axis: 2.3416 AU
- Eccentricity: 0.0893
- Orbital period (sidereal): 3.58 yr (1,309 d)
- Mean anomaly: 167.51°
- Mean motion: 0° 16^{m} 30.36^{s} / day
- Inclination: 7.9145°
- Longitude of ascending node: 30.505°
- Argument of perihelion: 22.518°

Physical characteristics
- Mean diameter: 4.278±0.143 km
- Geometric albedo: 0.384±0.042
- Absolute magnitude (H): 13.7

6257 Thorvaldsen, provisional designation 4098 T-1, is a bright Vestian asteroid from the inner regions of the asteroid belt, approximately 4.3 kilometers (2.7 miles) in diameter. It was discovered during the Palomar–Leiden Trojan survey on 26 March 1971, by Ingrid and Cornelis van Houten at Leiden, and Tom Gehrels at Palomar Observatory in California. The asteroid was named for Danish sculptor Bertel Thorvaldsen.

== Orbit and classification ==
When applying the hierarchical clustering method to its proper orbital elements, Thorvaldsen is a member of the Vesta family. It orbits the Sun in the inner asteroid belt at a distance of 2.1–2.6 AU once every 3 years and 7 months (1,309 days; semi-major axis of 2.34 AU). Its orbit has an eccentricity of 0.09 and an inclination of 8° with respect to the ecliptic. The asteroid was first observed as 1969 TH_{2} at Crimea–Nauchnij in October 1969. The body's observation arc begins with its official discovery observation at Palomar in 1971.

=== Palomar–Leiden Trojan survey ===
The survey designation "T-1" stands for the first Palomar–Leiden Trojan survey, named after the fruitful collaboration of the Palomar and Leiden Observatory in the 1960s and 1970s. Gehrels used Palomar's Samuel Oschin telescope (also known as the 48-inch Schmidt Telescope), and shipped the photographic plates to Ingrid and Cornelis van Houten at Leiden Observatory where astrometry was carried out. The trio are credited with the discovery of several thousand asteroid discoveries.

== Naming ==
This minor planet was named after Danish sculptor Bertel Thorvaldsen (1768–1844). The official naming citation was published by the Minor Planet Center on 5 March 1996 (M.P.C. 26765).

== Physical characteristics ==
Vestian asteroids have a composition akin to cumulate eucrites (HED meteorites) and are thought to have originated deep within 4 Vesta's crust, possibly from the Rheasilvia crater, a large impact crater on its southern hemisphere near the South pole, formed as a result of a subcatastrophic collision. Vesta is the main belt's second-largest and second-most-massive body after Ceres. Thorvaldsen has an absolute magnitude of 13.7. As of 2018, no rotational lightcurve of this asteroid has been obtained from photometric observations. The body's rotation period, pole and shape remain unknown.

=== Diameter and albedo ===
According to the survey carried out by the NEOWISE mission of NASA's Wide-field Infrared Survey Explorer, Thorvaldsen measures 4.278 kilometers in diameter and its surface has a high albedo of 0.384.
