= 2064 Thomsen =

Mars-crossing asteroid

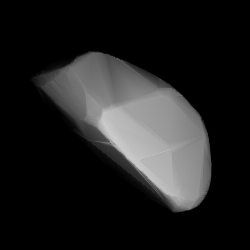
- Shape model of Thomsen from its lightcurve

Discovery
- Discovered by: L. Oterma
- Discovery site: Turku Obs.
- Discovery date: 8 September 1942

Designations
- Named after: Ivan Leslie Thomsen (New Zealand astronomer)
- Alternative designations: 1942 RQ · 1958 RO; 1974 OK · 1977 FE_{3} 1977 KA · A913 QB
- Minor planet category: Mars-crosser

Orbital characteristics
- Epoch 4 September 2017 (JD 2458000.5)
- Uncertainty parameter 0
- Observation arc: 74.50 yr (27,211 days)
- Aphelion: 2.8967 AU
- Perihelion: 1.4600 AU
- Semi-major axis: 2.1783 AU
- Eccentricity: 0.3298
- Orbital period (sidereal): 3.22 yr (1,174 days)
- Mean anomaly: 142.30°
- Mean motion: 0° 18^{m} 23.76^{s} / day
- Inclination: 5.6946°
- Longitude of ascending node: 302.16°
- Argument of perihelion: 2.7479°
- Earth MOID: 0.4446 AU

Physical characteristics
- Mean diameter: 8.09±0.12 km 13.59 km (derived); 13.61±1.6 km (IRAS:2)
- Synodic rotation period: 4.2267±0.0001 h 4.233 h 4.244023±0.000001 h 4.253±0.005 h
- Geometric albedo: 0.0549±0.015 (IRAS:2); 0.0644 (derived); 0.162±0.006
- Spectral type: SMASS = S · S B–V = 0.887; U–B = 0.524
- Absolute magnitude (H): 12.6 · 12.93 · 13.10 · 13.44±0.31

2064 Thomsen (prov. designation: 1942 RQ) is a stony asteroid and Mars-crosser on an eccentric orbit, that measures approximately 13 kilometers (8.1 miles) in diameter. The asteroid was discovered by Finnish astronomer Liisi Oterma at Turku Observatory, Finland, on 8 September 1942. It was named after New Zealand astronomer Ivan Leslie Thomsen

== Orbit and classification ==
The S-type asteroid orbits the Sun in the inner main-belt at a distance of 1.5–2.9 AU once every 3 years and 3 months (1,174 days). Its orbit has an eccentricity of 0.33 and an inclination of 6° with respect to the ecliptic.

== Naming ==
This minor planet was named in memory of New Zealand astronomer Ivan Leslie Thomsen (1910–1969), director of the Carter Observatory, Wellington, from 1945 until he was appointed director of the Mount John University Observatory only two months before his death. He was an enthusiastic coordinator of New Zealand's astronomy and his efforts eventually led to the minor-planet observing program with the Carter Observatory 41-cm reflector. It was the 1977 rediscovery at the Carter Observatory that allowed this minor planet to be numbered. The official naming citation was published by the Minor Planet Center on 1 August 1978 (M.P.C. 4421).

== Physical characteristics ==
Four rotational lightcurves gave a well-defined rotation period of 4.233 hours with a brightness variation of 0.62–0.69 magnitude (U=3/3/ .a./3) and an albedo of 0.055 and 0.16, as measured by the IRAS and Akari surveys, respectively.
