= 9991 Anežka =

Asteroid

- Orbit comparison of 9991 Anežka (blue), inner planets (red) and Jupiter (outermost)

Discovery
- Discovered by: Z. Moravec
- Discovery site: Kleť Obs.
- Discovery date: 5 October 1997

Designations
- Named after: Anežka Moravcová (discoverer's grandmother)
- Alternative designations: 1997 TY_{7} · 1977 DX_{9} 1983 GV_{1} · 1994 BZ
- Minor planet category: main-belt · Themis

Orbital characteristics
- Epoch 4 September 2017 (JD 2458000.5)
- Uncertainty parameter 0
- Observation arc: 40.19 yr (14,681 days)
- Aphelion: 3.7082 AU
- Perihelion: 2.6975 AU
- Semi-major axis: 3.2028 AU
- Eccentricity: 0.1578
- Orbital period (sidereal): 5.73 yr (2,094 days)
- Mean anomaly: 356.19°
- Mean motion: 0° 10^{m} 19.2^{s} / day
- Inclination: 2.1773°
- Longitude of ascending node: 80.608°
- Argument of perihelion: 115.62°

Physical characteristics
- Dimensions: 7.92 km (calculated); 12.293±0.294 km
- Synodic rotation period: 4.4692±0.0019 h
- Geometric albedo: 0.08 (assumed); 0.097±0.013
- Spectral type: C
- Absolute magnitude (H): 12.7 · 13.3 · 13.415±0.003 (R) · 13.86 · 13.89±0.32

9991 Anežka, provisional designation 1997 TY_{7}, is a carbonaceous Themistian asteroid from the outer region of the asteroid belt, approximately 10 kilometers in diameter.

The asteroid was discovered on 5 October 1997, by Czech astronomer Zdeněk Moravec at the South Bohemian Kleť Observatory in the Czech Republic. It was named after the discoverer's grandmother, Anežka Moravcová.

== Orbit and classification ==
Anežka is a carbonaceous asteroid and member of the Themis family, a dynamical family of outer main-belt asteroids with nearly coplanar ecliptical orbits. It orbits the Sun at a distance of 2.7–3.7 AU once every 5 years and 9 months (2,094 days). Its orbit has an eccentricity of 0.16 and an inclination of 2° with respect to the ecliptic. It was first identified as 1977 DX_{9} at the Japanese Kiso Observatory in 1977, extending the body's observation arc by 20 years prior to its discovery.

== Physical characteristics ==
=== Rotation period ===
A rotational lightcurve for this asteroid was obtained from photometric observations at the Palomar Transient Factory in December 2012. It gave it a rotation period of 4.4692±0.0019 hours with a brightness variation of 0.24 in magnitude (U=2).

=== Diameter and albedo ===
According to the survey carried out by the NEOWISE mission of NASA's Wide-field Infrared Survey Explorer, the asteroid measures 12.3 kilometers in diameter and its surface has an albedo of 0.097, while the Collaborative Asteroid Lightcurve Link assumes an albedo of 0.08 and calculates a diameter of 7.9 kilometers.

== Naming ==
This minor planet was named after the discoverer's grandmother, Anežka Moravcová (born 1924), on her 75th birthday. The official naming citation was published by the Minor Planet Center on 4 May 1999 (M.P.C. 34632).
