= 9951 Tyrannosaurus =

Asteroid

- Orbit of Tyrannosaurus (blue), with the inner planets and Jupiter (outermost)

Discovery
- Discovered by: E. W. Elst
- Discovery site: La Silla Obs.
- Discovery date: 15 November 1990

Designations
- Pronunciation: /tɪˌrænəˈsɔːrəs/
- Named after: Tyrannosaurus (theropod dinosaur)
- Alternative designations: 1990 VK_{5} · 1974 OG_{1} 1992 EZ_{5}
- Minor planet category: main-belt · (inner); Vesta

Orbital characteristics
- Epoch 4 September 2017 (JD 2458000.5)
- Uncertainty parameter 0
- Observation arc: 42.53 yr (15,534 days)
- Aphelion: 2.7243 AU
- Perihelion: 2.1283 AU
- Semi-major axis: 2.4263 AU
- Eccentricity: 0.1228
- Orbital period (sidereal): 3.78 yr (1,380 days)
- Mean anomaly: 155.31°
- Mean motion: 0° 15^{m} 38.88^{s} / day
- Inclination: 7.4000°
- Longitude of ascending node: 133.42°
- Argument of perihelion: 153.36°

Physical characteristics
- Dimensions: 17 km
- Spectral type: S
- Absolute magnitude (H): 14.2

9951 Tyrannosaurus, provisional designation 1990 VK_{5}, is a stony Vestian asteroid from the inner regions of the asteroid belt, approximately 17 kilometers in diameter. It was discovered on 15 November 1990, by Belgian astronomer Eric Elst at ESO's La Silla Observatory in northern Chile. It was named after Tyrannosaurus, a genus of dinosaurs.

== Classification and orbit ==
Based on the Hierarchical Clustering Method, Tyrannosaurus is a member of the Vesta family (401), which is named after its parent 4 Vesta, the main belt's second-largest and second-most-massive body after Ceres.

Tyrannosaurus orbits the Sun in the inner main-belt at a distance of 2.1–2.7 AU once every 3 years and 9 months (1,380 days). Its orbit has an eccentricity of 0.12 and an inclination of 7° with respect to the ecliptic. It was first identified as 1974 OG_{1} at El Leoncito in 1974, extending the body's observation arc by 16 years prior to its official discovery observation at La Silla.

== Physical characteristics ==
Tyrannosaurus has been characterized as a common S-type asteroid. The overall spectral type for members of the Vesta family is that of a V-type. Vestian asteroids have a composition akin to cumulate eucrites (HED meteorites) and are thought to have originated deep within 4 Vesta's crust, possibly from the Rheasilvia crater, a large impact crater on its southern hemisphere near the South pole, formed as a result of a subcatastrophic collision.

=== Diameter and albedo ===
According to the survey carried out by the Infrared Astronomical Satellite IRAS, Tyrannosaurus measures 17 kilometers in diameter. Spectroscopic observations indicate that it is a stony S-type asteroid, the most abundant spectral class of asteroids in the inner main-belt. It has an absolute magnitude of 14.2.

=== Lightcurves ===
As of 2017, no rotational lightcurve of Tyrannosaurus has been obtained. The asteroid's rotation period, poles and shape remain unknown.

== Naming ==
This minor planet was named for Tyrannosaurus, a large and heavy bipedal carnivorous dinosaur, that lived in the upper cretaceous. It was one of the most terrifying predators, with a large skull, massive jaws and sharp teeth. Adult individuals were 12 meters long and 4–7 meters high. Tyrannosaurus rex is the best known species of this genus. The official naming citation was published by the Minor Planet Center on 20 November 2002 (M.P.C. 47166).
