= Liisi Oterma =

Finnish astronomer

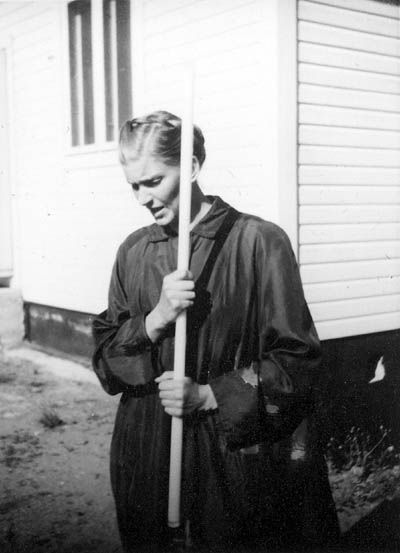
- Born: 6 January 1915; Turku
- Died: 4 April 2001 (aged 86); Turku
- Scientific career
- Fields: Astronomy

Signature
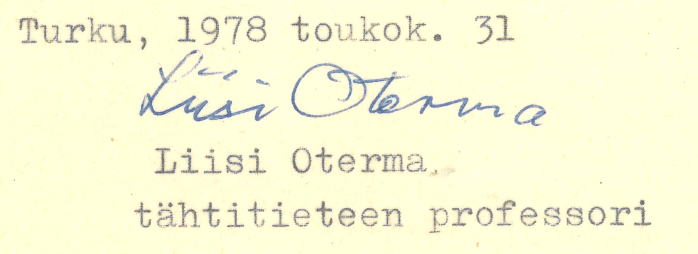

Liisi Oterma (Finnish pronunciation: [ˈliːsi ˈotermɑ]; 6 January 1915 – 4 April 2001) was a Finnish astronomer, the first woman to get a Ph.D. degree in astronomy in Finland.

She studied mathematics and astronomy at the University of Turku, and soon became Yrjö Väisälä's assistant and worked on the search for minor planets. She obtained her master's degree in 1938. From 1941 to 1965, Oterma worked as an observer at the university's observatory. She obtained her PhD in 1955 with a dissertation on telescope optics. She was the first Finnish woman to obtain a PhD in astronomy.

In 1959, Oterma became a docent of astronomy and from 1965 to 1978 a professor in University of Turku. In 1971, she succeeded Väisälä as the director of the Tuorla Observatory. She was director of the astronomical-optical research institute at the University of Turku from 1971-1975.

Oterma was interested in languages and spoke German, French, Italian, Spanish, Esperanto, Hungarian, English and also Arabic, for example. Oterma's original plans were to study Sanskrit, but it was not offered at the University of Turku, and the choice was ultimately focused on astronomy.

Oterma was quiet, modest in nature, and fearful of publicity. Anders Reiz, a professor at the Copenhagen Observatory, among others, said Oterma was “silent in eleven languages”. Oterma avoided appearing in photographs, and there are only a handful of pictures of her.

She discovered or co-discovered several comets, including periodic comets 38P/Stephan-Oterma, 39P/Oterma and 139P/Väisälä–Oterma. She is also credited by the Minor Planet Center (MPC) with the discovery of 54 minor planets between 1938 and 1953, and ranks 153rd on MPC's all-time discovery chart.

The Hildian asteroid 1529 Oterma, discovered by Finnish astronomer Yrjö Väisälä in 1938, was named in her honour.

== Minor planets discovered ==
1504 Lappeenranta	March 23, 1939
1507 Vaasa	September 12, 1939
1522 Kokkola	November 18, 1938
1540 Kevola	November 16, 1938
1544 Vinterhansenia	October 15, 1941
1545 Thernöe	October 15, 1941
1558 Järnefelt	January 20, 1942
1559 Kustaanheimo	January 20, 1942
1679 Nevanlinna	March 18, 1941
1680 Per Brahe	February 12, 1942
1695 Walbeck	October 15, 1941
1705 Tapio	September 26, 1941
1758 Naantali	February 18, 1942
1882 Rauma	October 15, 1941
2064 Thomsen	September 8, 1942
2107 Ilmari	November 12, 1941
2159 Kukkamäki	October 16, 1941
2195 Tengström	September 27, 1941
2268 Szmytowna	November 6, 1942
2291 Kevo	March 19, 1941
2332 Kalm	April 4, 1940
2501 Lohja	April 14, 1942
2640 Hällström	March 18, 1941
2717 Tellervo	November 29, 1940
2774 Tenojoki	October 3, 1942
2803 Vilho	November 29, 1940
2804 Yrjö	April 19, 1941

2805 Kalle	October 15, 1941
2827 Vellamo	February 11, 1942
2828 Iku-Turso	February 18, 1942
2840 Kallavesi	October 15, 1941
2841 Puijo	February 26, 1943
2846 Ylppö	February 12, 1942
2857 NOT	February 17, 1942
2912 Lapalma	February 18, 1942
2946 Muchachos	October 15, 1941
2988 Korhonen	March 1, 1943
3132 Landgraf	November 29, 1940
3381 Mikkola	October 15, 1941
3497 Innanen	April 19, 1941
3597 Kakkuri	October 15, 1941
3811 Karma	October 13, 1953
3892 Dezsö	April 19, 1941
4133 Heureka	February 17, 1942
4163 Saaremaa	April 19, 1941
4227 Kaali	February 17, 1942
(5216) 1941 HA	April 16, 1941
(5534) 1941 UN	October 15, 1941
(5611) 1943 DL	February 26, 1943
(5985) 1942 RJ	September 7, 1942
6886 Grote	February 11, 1942
7267 Victormeen	February 23, 1943
(11780) 1942 TB	October 3, 1942
(15198) 1940 GJ	April 5, 1940
