= List of minor planets: 713001–714000 =

The following is a partial list of minor planets, running from minor-planet number 713001 through 714000, inclusive. The primary data for this and other partial lists is based on JPL's "Small-Body Orbital Elements" and data available from the Minor Planet Center. Critical list information is also provided by the MPC, unless otherwise specified from Lowell Observatory. A detailed description of the table's columns and additional sources are given on the main page including a complete list of every page in this series, and a statistical break-up on the dynamical classification of minor planets.

Also see the summary list of all named bodies in numerical and alphabetical order, and the corresponding naming citations for the number range of this particular list. New namings may only be added to this list after official publication, as the preannouncement of names is condemned by the Working Group for Small Bodies Nomenclature of the International Astronomical Union.

Near-Earth obj.	MBA (inner)	MBA (outer)	Centaur
Mars-crosser	MBA (middle)	Jupiter trojan	Trans-Neptunian obj.
Unclassified

== 713001–713100 ==
Designation			Discovery			Properties		Ref
Permanent	Provisional	Named after	Date	Site	Discoverer(s)	Category	Diam.	Ref
713001	2014 WC_{471}	—	January 8, 2010	Mount Lemmon	Mount Lemmon Survey	·	2.7 km	MPC · JPL
713002	2014 WM_{474}	—	June 16, 2007	Kitt Peak	Spacewatch	·	2.3 km	MPC · JPL
713003	2014 WV_{481}	—	August 23, 2008	Siding Spring	SSS	·	2.2 km	MPC · JPL
713004	2014 WW_{482}	—	November 27, 2014	Haleakala	Pan-STARRS 1	·	2.6 km	MPC · JPL
713005	2014 WY_{482}	—	February 9, 2010	Mount Lemmon	Mount Lemmon Survey	HYG	2.3 km	MPC · JPL
713006	2014 WJ_{487}	—	May 24, 2011	Mount Lemmon	Mount Lemmon Survey	·	2.3 km	MPC · JPL
713007	2014 WS_{487}	—	September 25, 2014	Mount Lemmon	Mount Lemmon Survey	·	2.7 km	MPC · JPL
713008	2014 WN_{488}	—	August 23, 2008	Kitt Peak	Spacewatch	THM	1.9 km	MPC · JPL
713009	2014 WH_{489}	—	October 31, 2002	Palomar	NEAT	·	3.1 km	MPC · JPL
713010	2014 WU_{491}	—	January 28, 2004	Kitt Peak	Spacewatch	·	2.7 km	MPC · JPL
713011	2014 WL_{497}	—	January 17, 2011	Mount Lemmon	Mount Lemmon Survey	EOS	2.1 km	MPC · JPL
713012	2014 WR_{501}	—	October 20, 2007	Mount Lemmon	Mount Lemmon Survey	·	690 m	MPC · JPL
713013	2014 WT_{503}	—	November 20, 2003	Socorro	LINEAR	·	2.9 km	MPC · JPL
713014	2014 WF_{512}	—	November 21, 2014	Haleakala	Pan-STARRS 1	H	310 m	MPC · JPL
713015	2014 WK_{514}	—	November 22, 2014	Mount Lemmon	Mount Lemmon Survey	·	1.6 km	MPC · JPL
713016	2014 WO_{515}	—	November 21, 2014	Haleakala	Pan-STARRS 1	·	3.1 km	MPC · JPL
713017	2014 WL_{516}	—	August 31, 2013	Haleakala	Pan-STARRS 1	·	1.7 km	MPC · JPL
713018	2014 WN_{516}	—	November 21, 2014	Haleakala	Pan-STARRS 1	URS	2.8 km	MPC · JPL
713019	2014 WU_{519}	—	November 26, 2014	Haleakala	Pan-STARRS 1	·	2.2 km	MPC · JPL
713020	2014 WO_{522}	—	November 29, 2014	Mount Lemmon	Mount Lemmon Survey	·	2.7 km	MPC · JPL
713021	2014 WW_{523}	—	July 14, 2013	Haleakala	Pan-STARRS 1	KOR	1.0 km	MPC · JPL
713022	2014 WZ_{524}	—	November 20, 2014	Mount Lemmon	Mount Lemmon Survey	·	2.4 km	MPC · JPL
713023	2014 WE_{525}	—	November 20, 2014	Haleakala	Pan-STARRS 1	EOS	1.8 km	MPC · JPL
713024	2014 WB_{526}	—	November 21, 2014	Mount Lemmon	Mount Lemmon Survey	·	2.6 km	MPC · JPL
713025	2014 WR_{527}	—	September 19, 2007	Kitt Peak	Spacewatch	·	2.7 km	MPC · JPL
713026	2014 WK_{529}	—	March 9, 2005	Mount Lemmon	Mount Lemmon Survey	EOS	1.8 km	MPC · JPL
713027	2014 WF_{530}	—	August 12, 2013	Kitt Peak	Spacewatch	EOS	1.7 km	MPC · JPL
713028	2014 WP_{534}	—	November 30, 2014	Haleakala	Pan-STARRS 1	·	840 m	MPC · JPL
713029	2014 WN_{535}	—	October 7, 2007	Mount Lemmon	Mount Lemmon Survey	·	670 m	MPC · JPL
713030	2014 WU_{543}	—	March 18, 2017	Haleakala	Pan-STARRS 1	·	2.6 km	MPC · JPL
713031	2014 WV_{543}	—	November 21, 2014	Haleakala	Pan-STARRS 1	·	2.7 km	MPC · JPL
713032	2014 WM_{545}	—	November 29, 2014	Haleakala	Pan-STARRS 1	ULA	4.3 km	MPC · JPL
713033	2014 WK_{548}	—	December 16, 2015	Mount Lemmon	Mount Lemmon Survey	·	3.4 km	MPC · JPL
713034	2014 WV_{561}	—	January 4, 2016	Haleakala	Pan-STARRS 1	·	2.2 km	MPC · JPL
713035	2014 WU_{564}	—	November 23, 2014	Haleakala	Pan-STARRS 1	·	1.5 km	MPC · JPL
713036	2014 WA_{565}	—	November 26, 2014	Haleakala	Pan-STARRS 1	·	1.4 km	MPC · JPL
713037	2014 WB_{565}	—	November 25, 2014	Haleakala	Pan-STARRS 1	·	2.3 km	MPC · JPL
713038	2014 WU_{567}	—	November 17, 2014	Haleakala	Pan-STARRS 1	·	2.2 km	MPC · JPL
713039	2014 WA_{569}	—	November 21, 2014	Haleakala	Pan-STARRS 1	·	2.6 km	MPC · JPL
713040	2014 WL_{569}	—	November 20, 2014	Haleakala	Pan-STARRS 1	·	3.5 km	MPC · JPL
713041	2014 WV_{569}	—	November 26, 2014	Haleakala	Pan-STARRS 1	V	550 m	MPC · JPL
713042	2014 WH_{574}	—	November 23, 2014	Mount Lemmon	Mount Lemmon Survey	·	970 m	MPC · JPL
713043	2014 WV_{575}	—	November 16, 2014	Mount Lemmon	Mount Lemmon Survey	·	2.2 km	MPC · JPL
713044	2014 WN_{576}	—	November 17, 2014	Haleakala	Pan-STARRS 1	·	2.2 km	MPC · JPL
713045	2014 WG_{579}	—	November 17, 2014	Mount Lemmon	Mount Lemmon Survey	L5	7.7 km	MPC · JPL
713046	2014 WD_{583}	—	November 25, 2014	Mount Lemmon	Mount Lemmon Survey	·	2.5 km	MPC · JPL
713047	2014 WK_{583}	—	November 27, 2014	Haleakala	Pan-STARRS 1	L5	6.8 km	MPC · JPL
713048	2014 WS_{592}	—	November 22, 2014	Haleakala	Pan-STARRS 1	·	2.8 km	MPC · JPL
713049	2014 WE_{604}	—	November 22, 2014	Mount Lemmon	Mount Lemmon Survey	CLA	1.0 km	MPC · JPL
713050	2014 WF_{613}	—	November 1, 2013	Mount Lemmon	Mount Lemmon Survey	L5	6.9 km	MPC · JPL
713051	2014 WG_{613}	—	November 22, 2014	Mount Lemmon	Mount Lemmon Survey	·	2.2 km	MPC · JPL
713052	2014 WA_{614}	—	November 27, 2014	Haleakala	Pan-STARRS 1	URS	2.5 km	MPC · JPL
713053	2014 XG_{1}	—	November 21, 2014	Haleakala	Pan-STARRS 1	·	1.4 km	MPC · JPL
713054	2014 XG_{4}	—	October 18, 2003	Palomar	NEAT	·	2.7 km	MPC · JPL
713055	2014 XC_{5}	—	May 12, 2012	Haleakala	Pan-STARRS 1	·	2.8 km	MPC · JPL
713056	2014 XU_{7}	—	December 12, 2014	Haleakala	Pan-STARRS 1	H	420 m	MPC · JPL
713057	2014 XG_{9}	—	October 26, 2014	Mount Lemmon	Mount Lemmon Survey	·	750 m	MPC · JPL
713058	2014 XS_{9}	—	February 8, 2008	Mount Lemmon	Mount Lemmon Survey	NYS	980 m	MPC · JPL
713059	2014 XW_{10}	—	November 16, 2003	Kitt Peak	Spacewatch	·	2.1 km	MPC · JPL
713060	2014 XC_{14}	—	December 10, 2014	Mount Lemmon	Mount Lemmon Survey	·	3.0 km	MPC · JPL
713061	2014 XM_{15}	—	November 11, 2007	Mount Lemmon	Mount Lemmon Survey	·	580 m	MPC · JPL
713062	2014 XV_{16}	—	November 27, 2014	Haleakala	Pan-STARRS 1	·	2.9 km	MPC · JPL
713063	2014 XM_{23}	—	December 11, 2014	Mount Lemmon	Mount Lemmon Survey	VER	2.3 km	MPC · JPL
713064	2014 XP_{23}	—	November 19, 2003	Kitt Peak	Spacewatch	·	2.0 km	MPC · JPL
713065	2014 XG_{24}	—	April 11, 2011	Mount Lemmon	Mount Lemmon Survey	·	2.6 km	MPC · JPL
713066	2014 XS_{24}	—	November 16, 1998	Kitt Peak	Spacewatch	·	2.3 km	MPC · JPL
713067	2014 XC_{25}	—	November 29, 2014	Mount Lemmon	Mount Lemmon Survey	·	1.0 km	MPC · JPL
713068	2014 XG_{26}	—	September 10, 2013	Haleakala	Pan-STARRS 1	·	2.4 km	MPC · JPL
713069	2014 XD_{29}	—	December 12, 2014	Haleakala	Pan-STARRS 1	·	2.4 km	MPC · JPL
713070	2014 XK_{31}	—	March 12, 2005	Kitt Peak	Spacewatch	URS	2.8 km	MPC · JPL
713071	2014 XA_{33}	—	November 30, 2014	Mount Lemmon	Mount Lemmon Survey	·	3.5 km	MPC · JPL
713072	2014 XB_{37}	—	September 20, 2014	Haleakala	Pan-STARRS 1	·	2.8 km	MPC · JPL
713073	2014 XZ_{39}	—	August 25, 2012	Mount Lemmon	Mount Lemmon Survey	L5	10 km	MPC · JPL
713074	2014 XV_{45}	—	December 11, 2014	Mount Lemmon	Mount Lemmon Survey	·	2.7 km	MPC · JPL
713075	2014 XT_{50}	—	December 1, 2014	Haleakala	Pan-STARRS 1	EOS	1.6 km	MPC · JPL
713076	2014 YL_{4}	—	October 10, 2007	Catalina	CSS	·	720 m	MPC · JPL
713077	2014 YY_{11}	—	May 16, 2013	Mount Lemmon	Mount Lemmon Survey	·	780 m	MPC · JPL
713078	2014 YH_{12}	—	November 4, 2014	Mount Lemmon	Mount Lemmon Survey	H	580 m	MPC · JPL
713079	2014 YQ_{17}	—	October 20, 2008	Kitt Peak	Spacewatch	HYG	2.2 km	MPC · JPL
713080	2014 YN_{21}	—	February 16, 2004	Kitt Peak	Spacewatch	VER	3.0 km	MPC · JPL
713081	2014 YQ_{28}	—	October 9, 2007	Mount Lemmon	Mount Lemmon Survey	·	630 m	MPC · JPL
713082	2014 YL_{33}	—	May 24, 2006	Kitt Peak	Spacewatch	T_{j} (2.98) · EUP	3.5 km	MPC · JPL
713083	2014 YP_{33}	—	December 25, 2014	Haleakala	Pan-STARRS 1	H	490 m	MPC · JPL
713084	2014 YM_{35}	—	November 24, 2014	Mount Lemmon	Mount Lemmon Survey	·	850 m	MPC · JPL
713085	2014 YV_{40}	—	September 11, 2007	Kitt Peak	Spacewatch	LUT	4.1 km	MPC · JPL
713086	2014 YF_{44}	—	December 2, 2010	Kitt Peak	Spacewatch	·	1.6 km	MPC · JPL
713087	2014 YB_{51}	—	December 29, 2014	Haleakala	Pan-STARRS 1	H	480 m	MPC · JPL
713088	2014 YH_{55}	—	December 21, 2014	Haleakala	Pan-STARRS 1	·	630 m	MPC · JPL
713089	2014 YH_{58}	—	December 28, 2014	Palomar	Palomar Transient Factory	·	1.1 km	MPC · JPL
713090	2014 YR_{59}	—	December 21, 2014	Haleakala	Pan-STARRS 1	KOR	1.0 km	MPC · JPL
713091	2014 YJ_{60}	—	March 5, 2010	Kitt Peak	Spacewatch	·	2.5 km	MPC · JPL
713092	2014 YQ_{60}	—	December 21, 2014	Haleakala	Pan-STARRS 1	·	950 m	MPC · JPL
713093	2014 YW_{60}	—	December 21, 2014	Haleakala	Pan-STARRS 1	·	2.6 km	MPC · JPL
713094	2014 YA_{62}	—	August 25, 2012	Haleakala	Pan-STARRS 1	·	2.9 km	MPC · JPL
713095	2014 YY_{64}	—	December 3, 2015	Mount Lemmon	Mount Lemmon Survey	·	3.0 km	MPC · JPL
713096	2014 YL_{67}	—	December 26, 2014	Haleakala	Pan-STARRS 1	LUT	3.3 km	MPC · JPL
713097	2014 YZ_{67}	—	June 15, 2018	Haleakala	Pan-STARRS 1	·	2.6 km	MPC · JPL
713098	2014 YW_{76}	—	December 28, 2014	Mount Lemmon	Mount Lemmon Survey	·	2.5 km	MPC · JPL
713099	2014 YX_{79}	—	December 18, 2014	Haleakala	Pan-STARRS 1	PHO	910 m	MPC · JPL
713100	2014 YK_{82}	—	December 21, 2014	Haleakala	Pan-STARRS 1	·	510 m	MPC · JPL

== 713101–713200 ==
back to top

Designation			Discovery			Properties		Ref
Permanent	Provisional	Named after	Date	Site	Discoverer(s)	Category	Diam.	Ref
713101	2014 YO_{92}	—	December 21, 2014	Haleakala	Pan-STARRS 1	VER	2.3 km	MPC · JPL
713102	2015 AR_{1}	—	February 2, 2005	Kitt Peak	Spacewatch	EOS	1.8 km	MPC · JPL
713103	2015 AT_{1}	—	February 14, 2010	Mount Lemmon	Mount Lemmon Survey	·	2.5 km	MPC · JPL
713104	2015 AM_{3}	—	November 21, 2014	Haleakala	Pan-STARRS 1	L5	9.5 km	MPC · JPL
713105	2015 AY_{6}	—	October 10, 2002	Palomar	NEAT	·	2.9 km	MPC · JPL
713106	2015 AN_{9}	—	October 10, 2013	Haleakala	Pan-STARRS 1	·	3.1 km	MPC · JPL
713107	2015 AP_{9}	—	November 9, 2013	Mount Lemmon	Mount Lemmon Survey	·	3.0 km	MPC · JPL
713108	2015 AU_{11}	—	October 13, 2013	Oukaïmeden	C. Rinner	·	3.4 km	MPC · JPL
713109	2015 AE_{12}	—	October 12, 2007	Mount Lemmon	Mount Lemmon Survey	·	2.9 km	MPC · JPL
713110	2015 AR_{18}	—	November 1, 2014	Mount Lemmon	Mount Lemmon Survey	·	550 m	MPC · JPL
713111	2015 AY_{18}	—	December 5, 2007	Kitt Peak	Spacewatch	·	760 m	MPC · JPL
713112	2015 AJ_{20}	—	November 26, 2014	Haleakala	Pan-STARRS 1	HNS	900 m	MPC · JPL
713113	2015 AU_{23}	—	September 25, 2008	Kitt Peak	Spacewatch	·	2.2 km	MPC · JPL
713114	2015 AW_{23}	—	June 30, 2013	Haleakala	Pan-STARRS 1	·	2.5 km	MPC · JPL
713115	2015 AE_{30}	—	February 15, 2012	Haleakala	Pan-STARRS 1	·	620 m	MPC · JPL
713116	2015 AL_{30}	—	December 21, 2014	Haleakala	Pan-STARRS 1	·	2.9 km	MPC · JPL
713117	2015 AQ_{31}	—	November 6, 2008	Kitt Peak	Spacewatch	·	2.0 km	MPC · JPL
713118	2015 AU_{31}	—	October 24, 2011	Haleakala	Pan-STARRS 1	H	620 m	MPC · JPL
713119	2015 AK_{32}	—	May 8, 2011	Kitt Peak	Spacewatch	EOS	1.9 km	MPC · JPL
713120	2015 AR_{34}	—	January 10, 2006	Kitt Peak	Spacewatch	·	1.4 km	MPC · JPL
713121	2015 AM_{35}	—	January 11, 2008	Kitt Peak	Spacewatch	·	520 m	MPC · JPL
713122	2015 AD_{37}	—	December 21, 2014	Haleakala	Pan-STARRS 1	V	490 m	MPC · JPL
713123	2015 AY_{39}	—	October 28, 2010	Mount Lemmon	Mount Lemmon Survey	·	1.0 km	MPC · JPL
713124	2015 AW_{41}	—	October 28, 2010	Mount Lemmon	Mount Lemmon Survey	MAS	600 m	MPC · JPL
713125	2015 AP_{42}	—	September 10, 2013	Haleakala	Pan-STARRS 1	·	2.4 km	MPC · JPL
713126	2015 AU_{42}	—	September 17, 2010	Kitt Peak	Spacewatch	·	790 m	MPC · JPL
713127	2015 AK_{49}	—	November 28, 2014	Haleakala	Pan-STARRS 1	URS	3.0 km	MPC · JPL
713128	2015 AG_{50}	—	September 8, 2013	La Sagra	OAM	·	710 m	MPC · JPL
713129	2015 AK_{50}	—	January 13, 2015	Haleakala	Pan-STARRS 1	·	3.2 km	MPC · JPL
713130	2015 AP_{52}	—	January 13, 2015	Haleakala	Pan-STARRS 1	T_{j} (2.98) · EUP	2.6 km	MPC · JPL
713131	2015 AU_{52}	—	January 13, 2015	Haleakala	Pan-STARRS 1	·	1.8 km	MPC · JPL
713132	2015 AY_{53}	—	December 15, 2014	Mount Lemmon	Mount Lemmon Survey	·	2.7 km	MPC · JPL
713133 Taiping	2015 AB_{54}	Taiping	July 18, 2006	Lulin	LUSS	·	560 m	MPC · JPL
713134	2015 AE_{57}	—	September 27, 2013	Haleakala	Pan-STARRS 1	LIX	3.5 km	MPC · JPL
713135	2015 AY_{58}	—	December 1, 2008	Kitt Peak	Spacewatch	·	2.1 km	MPC · JPL
713136	2015 AU_{64}	—	September 3, 2013	Haleakala	Pan-STARRS 1	AGN	870 m	MPC · JPL
713137	2015 AX_{65}	—	January 13, 2015	Haleakala	Pan-STARRS 1	·	1.9 km	MPC · JPL
713138	2015 AP_{70}	—	January 13, 2015	Haleakala	Pan-STARRS 1	·	2.8 km	MPC · JPL
713139	2015 AC_{72}	—	March 29, 2012	Kitt Peak	Spacewatch	NYS	990 m	MPC · JPL
713140	2015 AZ_{72}	—	November 9, 1993	Kitt Peak	Spacewatch	·	560 m	MPC · JPL
713141	2015 AC_{73}	—	November 9, 2007	Mount Lemmon	Mount Lemmon Survey	·	560 m	MPC · JPL
713142	2015 AF_{83}	—	November 4, 2013	Mount Lemmon	Mount Lemmon Survey	·	2.1 km	MPC · JPL
713143	2015 AC_{84}	—	January 13, 2015	Haleakala	Pan-STARRS 1	·	720 m	MPC · JPL
713144	2015 AH_{87}	—	January 13, 2015	Haleakala	Pan-STARRS 1	·	1.9 km	MPC · JPL
713145	2015 AE_{89}	—	August 1, 2013	Mauna Kea	R. J. Wainscoat, M. Micheli	·	2.5 km	MPC · JPL
713146	2015 AD_{90}	—	January 13, 2015	Haleakala	Pan-STARRS 1	·	2.0 km	MPC · JPL
713147	2015 AB_{93}	—	August 28, 2013	Mount Bigelow	CSS	·	930 m	MPC · JPL
713148	2015 AN_{94}	—	September 4, 2014	Haleakala	Pan-STARRS 1	·	2.5 km	MPC · JPL
713149	2015 AO_{98}	—	November 9, 2013	Mount Lemmon	Mount Lemmon Survey	·	2.7 km	MPC · JPL
713150	2015 AH_{100}	—	October 29, 2010	Mount Lemmon	Mount Lemmon Survey	·	980 m	MPC · JPL
713151	2015 AK_{104}	—	August 15, 2013	Haleakala	Pan-STARRS 1	·	480 m	MPC · JPL
713152	2015 AX_{108}	—	November 8, 2008	Mount Lemmon	Mount Lemmon Survey	EOS	1.6 km	MPC · JPL
713153	2015 AC_{113}	—	September 30, 2005	Mount Lemmon	Mount Lemmon Survey	·	1 km	MPC · JPL
713154	2015 AQ_{119}	—	January 14, 2015	Haleakala	Pan-STARRS 1	KOR	990 m	MPC · JPL
713155	2015 AE_{120}	—	December 23, 2014	Kitt Peak	Spacewatch	LIX	3.1 km	MPC · JPL
713156	2015 AL_{121}	—	January 14, 2015	Haleakala	Pan-STARRS 1	·	1.0 km	MPC · JPL
713157	2015 AB_{125}	—	November 6, 2010	Kitt Peak	Spacewatch	·	720 m	MPC · JPL
713158	2015 AW_{129}	—	September 19, 2001	Kitt Peak	Spacewatch	·	2.4 km	MPC · JPL
713159	2015 AZ_{131}	—	October 20, 2006	Kitt Peak	Deep Ecliptic Survey	·	1.0 km	MPC · JPL
713160	2015 AA_{133}	—	October 20, 2006	Mount Lemmon	Mount Lemmon Survey	·	790 m	MPC · JPL
713161	2015 AV_{134}	—	January 14, 2015	Haleakala	Pan-STARRS 1	·	570 m	MPC · JPL
713162	2015 AM_{137}	—	January 14, 2015	Haleakala	Pan-STARRS 1	·	2.5 km	MPC · JPL
713163	2015 AS_{141}	—	January 14, 2015	Haleakala	Pan-STARRS 1	·	570 m	MPC · JPL
713164	2015 AH_{145}	—	January 14, 2015	Haleakala	Pan-STARRS 1	·	1.5 km	MPC · JPL
713165	2015 AD_{147}	—	December 30, 2008	Kitt Peak	Spacewatch	·	3.5 km	MPC · JPL
713166	2015 AK_{147}	—	December 21, 2014	Haleakala	Pan-STARRS 1	·	970 m	MPC · JPL
713167	2015 AU_{150}	—	October 27, 2013	Kitt Peak	Spacewatch	·	2.9 km	MPC · JPL
713168	2015 AL_{152}	—	February 1, 2005	Kitt Peak	Spacewatch	·	510 m	MPC · JPL
713169	2015 AE_{166}	—	January 14, 2015	Haleakala	Pan-STARRS 1	·	1.2 km	MPC · JPL
713170	2015 AG_{168}	—	December 1, 2010	Mount Lemmon	Mount Lemmon Survey	·	750 m	MPC · JPL
713171	2015 AN_{169}	—	October 3, 2013	Haleakala	Pan-STARRS 1	NYS	1.2 km	MPC · JPL
713172	2015 AK_{179}	—	May 31, 2013	Haleakala	Pan-STARRS 1	·	890 m	MPC · JPL
713173	2015 AX_{182}	—	December 18, 2003	Kitt Peak	Spacewatch	·	1.7 km	MPC · JPL
713174	2015 AH_{183}	—	April 24, 2001	Kitt Peak	Spacewatch	MAS	620 m	MPC · JPL
713175	2015 AO_{183}	—	February 12, 2011	Mount Lemmon	Mount Lemmon Survey	·	990 m	MPC · JPL
713176	2015 AD_{184}	—	December 21, 2014	Mount Lemmon	Mount Lemmon Survey	·	2.3 km	MPC · JPL
713177	2015 AG_{186}	—	January 14, 2015	Haleakala	Pan-STARRS 1	·	600 m	MPC · JPL
713178	2015 AU_{186}	—	April 27, 2012	Haleakala	Pan-STARRS 1	PHO	870 m	MPC · JPL
713179	2015 AR_{191}	—	November 4, 2007	Kitt Peak	Spacewatch	·	520 m	MPC · JPL
713180	2015 AW_{191}	—	January 14, 2015	Haleakala	Pan-STARRS 1	AGN	830 m	MPC · JPL
713181	2015 AF_{198}	—	October 3, 2013	Haleakala	Pan-STARRS 1	·	1.7 km	MPC · JPL
713182	2015 AJ_{199}	—	November 26, 2010	Mount Lemmon	Mount Lemmon Survey	·	1.1 km	MPC · JPL
713183	2015 AX_{199}	—	September 23, 2005	Kitt Peak	Spacewatch	·	1.1 km	MPC · JPL
713184	2015 AX_{203}	—	August 12, 2013	Kitt Peak	Spacewatch	·	1.9 km	MPC · JPL
713185	2015 AJ_{206}	—	January 15, 2015	Mount Lemmon	Mount Lemmon Survey	KOR	1.1 km	MPC · JPL
713186	2015 AS_{207}	—	December 18, 2004	Mount Lemmon	Mount Lemmon Survey	·	2.6 km	MPC · JPL
713187	2015 AD_{210}	—	December 29, 2014	Haleakala	Pan-STARRS 1	·	560 m	MPC · JPL
713188	2015 AF_{215}	—	August 12, 2013	Haleakala	Pan-STARRS 1	·	1.0 km	MPC · JPL
713189	2015 AL_{216}	—	June 11, 2013	Mount Lemmon	Mount Lemmon Survey	·	2.5 km	MPC · JPL
713190	2015 AV_{217}	—	March 29, 2011	Mount Lemmon	Mount Lemmon Survey	·	2.5 km	MPC · JPL
713191	2015 AU_{218}	—	January 15, 2015	Haleakala	Pan-STARRS 1	L5	9.1 km	MPC · JPL
713192	2015 AV_{218}	—	January 12, 2010	Kitt Peak	Spacewatch	·	2.3 km	MPC · JPL
713193	2015 AK_{220}	—	January 15, 2015	Haleakala	Pan-STARRS 1	·	2.6 km	MPC · JPL
713194	2015 AE_{223}	—	November 28, 2013	Mount Lemmon	Mount Lemmon Survey	·	3.3 km	MPC · JPL
713195	2015 AU_{224}	—	September 16, 2012	Mount Lemmon	Mount Lemmon Survey	·	2.8 km	MPC · JPL
713196	2015 AE_{230}	—	October 15, 2007	Mount Lemmon	Mount Lemmon Survey	·	2.2 km	MPC · JPL
713197	2015 AM_{232}	—	August 15, 2013	Haleakala	Pan-STARRS 1	·	810 m	MPC · JPL
713198	2015 AP_{239}	—	August 27, 2009	Kitt Peak	Spacewatch	·	1.1 km	MPC · JPL
713199	2015 AK_{240}	—	January 15, 2015	Haleakala	Pan-STARRS 1	·	2.6 km	MPC · JPL
713200	2015 AW_{244}	—	February 16, 2004	Kitt Peak	Spacewatch	·	1.3 km	MPC · JPL

== 713201–713300 ==
back to top

Designation			Discovery			Properties		Ref
Permanent	Provisional	Named after	Date	Site	Discoverer(s)	Category	Diam.	Ref
713201	2015 AG_{246}	—	November 27, 2014	Kitt Peak	Spacewatch	EUP	3.4 km	MPC · JPL
713202	2015 AL_{246}	—	August 13, 2013	Kitt Peak	Spacewatch	·	2.6 km	MPC · JPL
713203	2015 AW_{246}	—	August 8, 2013	Haleakala	Pan-STARRS 1	·	2.1 km	MPC · JPL
713204	2015 AB_{253}	—	December 21, 2014	Mount Lemmon	Mount Lemmon Survey	NYS	980 m	MPC · JPL
713205	2015 AJ_{255}	—	May 23, 2012	Mount Lemmon	Mount Lemmon Survey	TIR	2.6 km	MPC · JPL
713206	2015 AK_{256}	—	October 29, 2008	Kitt Peak	Spacewatch	·	2.5 km	MPC · JPL
713207	2015 AQ_{258}	—	November 27, 2013	Haleakala	Pan-STARRS 1	L5	8.1 km	MPC · JPL
713208	2015 AZ_{258}	—	March 13, 2012	Mount Lemmon	Mount Lemmon Survey	·	530 m	MPC · JPL
713209	2015 AH_{262}	—	June 4, 2011	Mount Lemmon	Mount Lemmon Survey	·	2.7 km	MPC · JPL
713210	2015 AX_{265}	—	January 13, 2015	Haleakala	Pan-STARRS 1	·	2.3 km	MPC · JPL
713211	2015 AW_{269}	—	March 11, 2005	Kitt Peak	Deep Ecliptic Survey	·	710 m	MPC · JPL
713212	2015 AX_{270}	—	November 15, 2006	Kitt Peak	Spacewatch	MAS	680 m	MPC · JPL
713213	2015 AH_{272}	—	May 21, 2012	Haleakala	Pan-STARRS 1	·	1.8 km	MPC · JPL
713214	2015 AN_{273}	—	September 13, 2005	Kitt Peak	Spacewatch	·	1.2 km	MPC · JPL
713215	2015 AZ_{273}	—	March 29, 2011	Mount Lemmon	Mount Lemmon Survey	HOF	2.0 km	MPC · JPL
713216	2015 AN_{280}	—	April 1, 2012	Mount Lemmon	Mount Lemmon Survey	·	920 m	MPC · JPL
713217	2015 AQ_{280}	—	December 24, 2006	Mount Lemmon	Mount Lemmon Survey	H	530 m	MPC · JPL
713218	2015 AZ_{284}	—	October 5, 2013	Mount Lemmon	Mount Lemmon Survey	AGN	770 m	MPC · JPL
713219	2015 AJ_{287}	—	June 18, 2013	Haleakala	Pan-STARRS 1	·	1.2 km	MPC · JPL
713220	2015 AR_{289}	—	January 13, 2015	Haleakala	Pan-STARRS 1	·	2.9 km	MPC · JPL
713221	2015 AV_{289}	—	January 13, 2015	Haleakala	Pan-STARRS 1	·	1.0 km	MPC · JPL
713222	2015 AD_{290}	—	September 27, 2013	Haleakala	Pan-STARRS 1	HYG	2.9 km	MPC · JPL
713223	2015 AM_{290}	—	October 18, 2003	Apache Point	SDSS Collaboration	·	560 m	MPC · JPL
713224	2015 AX_{290}	—	January 28, 2004	Kitt Peak	Spacewatch	·	2.7 km	MPC · JPL
713225	2015 AO_{293}	—	January 13, 2015	Haleakala	Pan-STARRS 1	·	3.0 km	MPC · JPL
713226	2015 AH_{295}	—	September 24, 2013	Mount Lemmon	Mount Lemmon Survey	LIX	2.7 km	MPC · JPL
713227	2015 AF_{298}	—	January 13, 2015	Haleakala	Pan-STARRS 1	·	2.8 km	MPC · JPL
713228	2015 AF_{303}	—	January 13, 2015	Haleakala	Pan-STARRS 1	JUN	880 m	MPC · JPL
713229	2015 BS_{1}	—	December 21, 2014	Haleakala	Pan-STARRS 1	·	1.0 km	MPC · JPL
713230	2015 BB_{3}	—	October 17, 2006	Kitt Peak	Spacewatch	·	1.0 km	MPC · JPL
713231	2015 BJ_{3}	—	October 4, 2013	Mount Lemmon	Mount Lemmon Survey	·	1.5 km	MPC · JPL
713232	2015 BE_{7}	—	November 8, 2007	Kitt Peak	Spacewatch	·	670 m	MPC · JPL
713233	2015 BK_{7}	—	January 16, 2015	Mount Lemmon	Mount Lemmon Survey	·	1.6 km	MPC · JPL
713234	2015 BO_{7}	—	December 13, 2006	Catalina	CSS	H	540 m	MPC · JPL
713235	2015 BA_{8}	—	December 12, 2010	Kitt Peak	Spacewatch	NYS	1.0 km	MPC · JPL
713236	2015 BO_{9}	—	January 16, 2015	Haleakala	Pan-STARRS 1	·	3.1 km	MPC · JPL
713237	2015 BD_{11}	—	January 16, 2015	Mount Lemmon	Mount Lemmon Survey	·	3.0 km	MPC · JPL
713238	2015 BL_{11}	—	June 13, 2012	Haleakala	Pan-STARRS 1	TIR	2.6 km	MPC · JPL
713239	2015 BV_{12}	—	September 15, 2013	Kitt Peak	Spacewatch	·	3.0 km	MPC · JPL
713240	2015 BX_{13}	—	January 16, 2015	Mount Lemmon	Mount Lemmon Survey	PHO	630 m	MPC · JPL
713241	2015 BT_{15}	—	January 16, 2015	Mount Lemmon	Mount Lemmon Survey	·	2.8 km	MPC · JPL
713242	2015 BP_{18}	—	December 26, 2014	Haleakala	Pan-STARRS 1	·	2.8 km	MPC · JPL
713243	2015 BP_{20}	—	August 12, 2013	Haleakala	Pan-STARRS 1	·	870 m	MPC · JPL
713244	2015 BB_{22}	—	October 13, 2010	Catalina	CSS	·	680 m	MPC · JPL
713245	2015 BB_{31}	—	August 15, 2013	Charleston	R. Holmes	·	1 km	MPC · JPL
713246	2015 BV_{34}	—	May 1, 2011	Haleakala	Pan-STARRS 1	·	2.8 km	MPC · JPL
713247	2015 BZ_{34}	—	December 7, 2008	Mount Lemmon	Mount Lemmon Survey	·	2.4 km	MPC · JPL
713248	2015 BA_{38}	—	December 29, 2014	Haleakala	Pan-STARRS 1	VER	2.6 km	MPC · JPL
713249	2015 BQ_{39}	—	December 26, 2014	Haleakala	Pan-STARRS 1	HOF	1.9 km	MPC · JPL
713250	2015 BE_{40}	—	March 24, 2012	Kitt Peak	Spacewatch	·	580 m	MPC · JPL
713251	2015 BG_{40}	—	March 15, 2012	Mount Lemmon	Mount Lemmon Survey	·	520 m	MPC · JPL
713252	2015 BZ_{41}	—	September 15, 2013	Haleakala	Pan-STARRS 1	·	2.4 km	MPC · JPL
713253	2015 BP_{42}	—	November 26, 2014	Haleakala	Pan-STARRS 1	·	2.1 km	MPC · JPL
713254	2015 BS_{42}	—	November 28, 2014	Haleakala	Pan-STARRS 1	·	2.9 km	MPC · JPL
713255	2015 BN_{43}	—	November 14, 2007	Kitt Peak	Spacewatch	·	630 m	MPC · JPL
713256	2015 BD_{44}	—	September 13, 2007	Mount Lemmon	Mount Lemmon Survey	·	500 m	MPC · JPL
713257	2015 BO_{44}	—	February 15, 2012	Haleakala	Pan-STARRS 1	V	550 m	MPC · JPL
713258	2015 BC_{46}	—	October 13, 2002	Palomar	NEAT	·	3.0 km	MPC · JPL
713259	2015 BZ_{47}	—	August 13, 2013	Kitt Peak	Spacewatch	·	2.8 km	MPC · JPL
713260	2015 BB_{53}	—	May 16, 2009	Kitt Peak	Spacewatch	·	610 m	MPC · JPL
713261	2015 BA_{54}	—	September 18, 2003	Kitt Peak	Spacewatch	·	1.6 km	MPC · JPL
713262	2015 BJ_{54}	—	January 17, 2015	Mount Lemmon	Mount Lemmon Survey	DOR	2.4 km	MPC · JPL
713263	2015 BL_{54}	—	August 13, 2012	Haleakala	Pan-STARRS 1	·	2.6 km	MPC · JPL
713264	2015 BA_{56}	—	September 14, 2006	Catalina	CSS	·	1.2 km	MPC · JPL
713265	2015 BT_{57}	—	February 12, 2004	Kitt Peak	Spacewatch	V	510 m	MPC · JPL
713266	2015 BR_{58}	—	January 17, 2015	Haleakala	Pan-STARRS 1	·	610 m	MPC · JPL
713267	2015 BY_{63}	—	December 26, 2014	Haleakala	Pan-STARRS 1	·	900 m	MPC · JPL
713268	2015 BG_{66}	—	January 8, 2011	Mount Lemmon	Mount Lemmon Survey	·	1.2 km	MPC · JPL
713269	2015 BC_{69}	—	September 18, 2009	Kitt Peak	Spacewatch	·	1.3 km	MPC · JPL
713270	2015 BY_{72}	—	September 13, 2007	Kitt Peak	Spacewatch	VER	2.7 km	MPC · JPL
713271	2015 BU_{73}	—	January 17, 2015	Haleakala	Pan-STARRS 1	·	1.2 km	MPC · JPL
713272	2015 BS_{74}	—	September 22, 2008	Kitt Peak	Spacewatch	AGN	1.1 km	MPC · JPL
713273	2015 BW_{80}	—	December 1, 2003	Kitt Peak	Spacewatch	·	850 m	MPC · JPL
713274	2015 BG_{83}	—	January 18, 2015	Mount Lemmon	Mount Lemmon Survey	·	2.5 km	MPC · JPL
713275	2015 BR_{84}	—	September 26, 2009	Kitt Peak	Spacewatch	·	1.0 km	MPC · JPL
713276	2015 BC_{91}	—	April 2, 2011	Haleakala	Pan-STARRS 1	·	930 m	MPC · JPL
713277	2015 BE_{93}	—	December 9, 2014	Haleakala	Pan-STARRS 1	LIX	2.7 km	MPC · JPL
713278	2015 BH_{94}	—	January 25, 2006	Kitt Peak	Spacewatch	·	1.4 km	MPC · JPL
713279	2015 BV_{94}	—	December 21, 2014	Haleakala	Pan-STARRS 1	·	990 m	MPC · JPL
713280	2015 BR_{95}	—	December 26, 2014	Haleakala	Pan-STARRS 1	·	2.9 km	MPC · JPL
713281	2015 BJ_{101}	—	December 2, 2008	Mount Lemmon	Mount Lemmon Survey	·	2.3 km	MPC · JPL
713282	2015 BL_{108}	—	February 15, 2010	Kitt Peak	Spacewatch	·	2.4 km	MPC · JPL
713283	2015 BP_{114}	—	September 4, 2007	Mount Lemmon	Mount Lemmon Survey	·	2.7 km	MPC · JPL
713284	2015 BA_{116}	—	January 17, 2015	Mount Lemmon	Mount Lemmon Survey	·	2.9 km	MPC · JPL
713285	2015 BM_{116}	—	November 20, 2014	Mount Lemmon	Mount Lemmon Survey	·	2.5 km	MPC · JPL
713286	2015 BY_{116}	—	January 17, 2015	Mount Lemmon	Mount Lemmon Survey	·	2.9 km	MPC · JPL
713287	2015 BB_{121}	—	November 14, 2010	Mount Lemmon	Mount Lemmon Survey	·	940 m	MPC · JPL
713288	2015 BC_{127}	—	January 17, 2015	Haleakala	Pan-STARRS 1	·	860 m	MPC · JPL
713289	2015 BD_{130}	—	January 17, 2015	Haleakala	Pan-STARRS 1	·	840 m	MPC · JPL
713290	2015 BU_{131}	—	January 17, 2015	Haleakala	Pan-STARRS 1	·	2.8 km	MPC · JPL
713291	2015 BY_{131}	—	January 17, 2015	Haleakala	Pan-STARRS 1	·	1.9 km	MPC · JPL
713292	2015 BQ_{132}	—	April 11, 2005	Kitt Peak	Deep Ecliptic Survey	·	800 m	MPC · JPL
713293	2015 BL_{134}	—	October 29, 2002	Palomar	NEAT	·	2.3 km	MPC · JPL
713294	2015 BN_{141}	—	January 17, 2015	Haleakala	Pan-STARRS 1	·	1.7 km	MPC · JPL
713295	2015 BX_{145}	—	March 29, 2008	Mount Lemmon	Mount Lemmon Survey	CLA	1.1 km	MPC · JPL
713296	2015 BY_{148}	—	May 26, 2008	Kitt Peak	Spacewatch	·	1.2 km	MPC · JPL
713297	2015 BZ_{148}	—	January 29, 2009	Mount Lemmon	Mount Lemmon Survey	·	3.3 km	MPC · JPL
713298	2015 BE_{149}	—	November 27, 2013	Haleakala	Pan-STARRS 1	·	3.1 km	MPC · JPL
713299	2015 BR_{151}	—	January 17, 2015	Haleakala	Pan-STARRS 1	·	1.9 km	MPC · JPL
713300	2015 BA_{152}	—	November 8, 2013	Mount Lemmon	Mount Lemmon Survey	·	1.2 km	MPC · JPL

== 713301–713400 ==
back to top

Designation			Discovery			Properties		Ref
Permanent	Provisional	Named after	Date	Site	Discoverer(s)	Category	Diam.	Ref
713301	2015 BY_{157}	—	November 28, 2014	Haleakala	Pan-STARRS 1	·	2.0 km	MPC · JPL
713302	2015 BE_{161}	—	February 8, 2002	Kitt Peak	Deep Ecliptic Survey	·	980 m	MPC · JPL
713303	2015 BT_{163}	—	April 13, 2012	Haleakala	Pan-STARRS 1	·	540 m	MPC · JPL
713304	2015 BG_{169}	—	March 10, 2008	Mount Lemmon	Mount Lemmon Survey	NYS	960 m	MPC · JPL
713305	2015 BK_{172}	—	October 22, 2006	Kitt Peak	Spacewatch	·	990 m	MPC · JPL
713306	2015 BC_{174}	—	January 13, 2008	Kitt Peak	Spacewatch	(2076)	730 m	MPC · JPL
713307	2015 BP_{175}	—	March 28, 2012	Mount Lemmon	Mount Lemmon Survey	·	950 m	MPC · JPL
713308	2015 BM_{177}	—	November 16, 2006	Kitt Peak	Spacewatch	CLA	1.5 km	MPC · JPL
713309	2015 BS_{182}	—	January 17, 2015	Haleakala	Pan-STARRS 1	·	1.1 km	MPC · JPL
713310	2015 BU_{182}	—	January 13, 2011	Mount Lemmon	Mount Lemmon Survey	·	1.3 km	MPC · JPL
713311	2015 BT_{184}	—	September 15, 2013	Catalina	CSS	EUN	910 m	MPC · JPL
713312	2015 BB_{189}	—	April 4, 2008	Mount Lemmon	Mount Lemmon Survey	·	1.0 km	MPC · JPL
713313	2015 BO_{189}	—	September 5, 2007	Catalina	CSS	·	2.5 km	MPC · JPL
713314	2015 BR_{190}	—	November 24, 2009	Kitt Peak	Spacewatch	MIS	2.3 km	MPC · JPL
713315	2015 BE_{193}	—	July 6, 2002	Kitt Peak	Spacewatch	·	750 m	MPC · JPL
713316	2015 BP_{193}	—	August 30, 2006	Anderson Mesa	LONEOS	·	890 m	MPC · JPL
713317	2015 BY_{193}	—	October 23, 2009	Mount Lemmon	Mount Lemmon Survey	·	1.0 km	MPC · JPL
713318	2015 BF_{196}	—	October 24, 2013	Mount Lemmon	Mount Lemmon Survey	·	1.5 km	MPC · JPL
713319	2015 BN_{196}	—	October 5, 2013	Haleakala	Pan-STARRS 1	·	1.1 km	MPC · JPL
713320	2015 BC_{201}	—	December 29, 2008	Kitt Peak	Spacewatch	·	2.3 km	MPC · JPL
713321	2015 BG_{203}	—	February 4, 2012	Haleakala	Pan-STARRS 1	·	650 m	MPC · JPL
713322	2015 BM_{206}	—	June 28, 2013	Haleakala	Pan-STARRS 1	·	1.1 km	MPC · JPL
713323	2015 BA_{212}	—	July 19, 2001	Kitt Peak	Spacewatch	·	2.3 km	MPC · JPL
713324	2015 BX_{215}	—	May 11, 2005	Kitt Peak	Spacewatch	·	2.8 km	MPC · JPL
713325	2015 BX_{216}	—	December 26, 2014	Haleakala	Pan-STARRS 1	·	3.2 km	MPC · JPL
713326	2015 BM_{217}	—	October 24, 2009	Mount Lemmon	Mount Lemmon Survey	·	1.8 km	MPC · JPL
713327	2015 BS_{222}	—	September 4, 2008	Kitt Peak	Spacewatch	·	1.7 km	MPC · JPL
713328	2015 BM_{229}	—	November 7, 2008	Mount Lemmon	Mount Lemmon Survey	·	2.5 km	MPC · JPL
713329	2015 BY_{229}	—	October 6, 2008	Mount Lemmon	Mount Lemmon Survey	·	1.8 km	MPC · JPL
713330	2015 BN_{230}	—	September 30, 2006	Catalina	CSS	·	980 m	MPC · JPL
713331	2015 BY_{231}	—	September 17, 2012	Mount Lemmon	Mount Lemmon Survey	·	3.0 km	MPC · JPL
713332	2015 BR_{232}	—	September 26, 2006	Mount Lemmon	Mount Lemmon Survey	V	660 m	MPC · JPL
713333	2015 BM_{236}	—	March 23, 2009	XuYi	PMO NEO Survey Program	·	710 m	MPC · JPL
713334	2015 BN_{237}	—	October 2, 2006	Mount Lemmon	Mount Lemmon Survey	V	530 m	MPC · JPL
713335	2015 BA_{239}	—	January 17, 2015	Mount Lemmon	Mount Lemmon Survey	SUL	1.4 km	MPC · JPL
713336	2015 BK_{239}	—	September 11, 2002	Palomar	NEAT	·	2.2 km	MPC · JPL
713337	2015 BH_{245}	—	September 10, 2010	Kitt Peak	Spacewatch	·	510 m	MPC · JPL
713338	2015 BH_{247}	—	September 11, 2010	Mount Lemmon	Mount Lemmon Survey	·	700 m	MPC · JPL
713339	2015 BU_{254}	—	October 20, 2003	Kitt Peak	Spacewatch	·	650 m	MPC · JPL
713340	2015 BU_{257}	—	September 23, 2008	Mount Lemmon	Mount Lemmon Survey	·	1.6 km	MPC · JPL
713341	2015 BK_{258}	—	October 1, 2013	Mount Lemmon	Mount Lemmon Survey	·	1.4 km	MPC · JPL
713342	2015 BL_{261}	—	September 27, 2003	Kitt Peak	Spacewatch	·	670 m	MPC · JPL
713343	2015 BM_{261}	—	October 11, 2005	Kitt Peak	Spacewatch	NYS	1.1 km	MPC · JPL
713344	2015 BJ_{264}	—	December 3, 2013	Haleakala	Pan-STARRS 1	·	2.6 km	MPC · JPL
713345	2015 BF_{265}	—	October 2, 2013	Haleakala	Pan-STARRS 1	AGN	930 m	MPC · JPL
713346	2015 BX_{266}	—	October 7, 2014	Haleakala	Pan-STARRS 1	·	2.6 km	MPC · JPL
713347	2015 BO_{267}	—	July 15, 2013	Haleakala	Pan-STARRS 1	·	2.7 km	MPC · JPL
713348	2015 BW_{268}	—	December 18, 2014	Haleakala	Pan-STARRS 1	URS	3.1 km	MPC · JPL
713349	2015 BJ_{269}	—	September 12, 2007	Mount Lemmon	Mount Lemmon Survey	·	2.6 km	MPC · JPL
713350	2015 BA_{270}	—	December 17, 2009	Kitt Peak	Spacewatch	·	3.2 km	MPC · JPL
713351	2015 BC_{270}	—	July 15, 2013	Haleakala	Pan-STARRS 1	URS	2.3 km	MPC · JPL
713352	2015 BY_{272}	—	October 9, 2010	Mount Lemmon	Mount Lemmon Survey	·	530 m	MPC · JPL
713353	2015 BN_{275}	—	January 18, 2012	Kitt Peak	Spacewatch	·	1.2 km	MPC · JPL
713354	2015 BX_{276}	—	November 26, 2014	Haleakala	Pan-STARRS 1	·	3.0 km	MPC · JPL
713355	2015 BO_{280}	—	January 19, 2015	Haleakala	Pan-STARRS 1	T_{j} (2.98)	3.3 km	MPC · JPL
713356	2015 BB_{283}	—	September 11, 2007	Mount Lemmon	Mount Lemmon Survey	·	2.6 km	MPC · JPL
713357	2015 BZ_{285}	—	June 12, 2011	Mount Lemmon	Mount Lemmon Survey	·	2.6 km	MPC · JPL
713358	2015 BV_{292}	—	January 19, 2015	Mount Lemmon	Mount Lemmon Survey	EUN	1.3 km	MPC · JPL
713359	2015 BS_{299}	—	April 20, 2007	Kitt Peak	Spacewatch	·	960 m	MPC · JPL
713360	2015 BP_{302}	—	March 28, 2012	Kitt Peak	Spacewatch	·	720 m	MPC · JPL
713361	2015 BO_{304}	—	September 28, 2013	Mount Lemmon	Mount Lemmon Survey	·	740 m	MPC · JPL
713362	2015 BW_{305}	—	November 4, 2002	Kitt Peak	Spacewatch	VER	2.8 km	MPC · JPL
713363	2015 BE_{306}	—	October 3, 2013	Haleakala	Pan-STARRS 1	EOS	1.8 km	MPC · JPL
713364	2015 BV_{308}	—	November 1, 2007	Kitt Peak	Spacewatch	·	2.7 km	MPC · JPL
713365	2015 BN_{312}	—	February 26, 2008	Mount Lemmon	Mount Lemmon Survey	·	740 m	MPC · JPL
713366	2015 BN_{314}	—	August 15, 2006	Palomar	NEAT	ERI	1.3 km	MPC · JPL
713367	2015 BT_{322}	—	November 16, 2006	Kitt Peak	Spacewatch	·	880 m	MPC · JPL
713368	2015 BS_{324}	—	January 17, 2015	Haleakala	Pan-STARRS 1	VER	2.1 km	MPC · JPL
713369	2015 BW_{326}	—	February 13, 2011	Mount Lemmon	Mount Lemmon Survey	·	1.3 km	MPC · JPL
713370	2015 BG_{328}	—	January 17, 2015	Haleakala	Pan-STARRS 1	·	950 m	MPC · JPL
713371	2015 BC_{333}	—	September 24, 2009	Catalina	CSS	·	1.2 km	MPC · JPL
713372	2015 BX_{333}	—	January 17, 2015	Haleakala	Pan-STARRS 1	·	1.2 km	MPC · JPL
713373	2015 BH_{343}	—	January 26, 2011	Mount Lemmon	Mount Lemmon Survey	·	1.2 km	MPC · JPL
713374	2015 BW_{347}	—	November 3, 2014	Mount Lemmon	Mount Lemmon Survey	·	2.8 km	MPC · JPL
713375	2015 BQ_{350}	—	September 28, 2013	Mount Lemmon	Mount Lemmon Survey	·	3.1 km	MPC · JPL
713376	2015 BU_{350}	—	January 12, 2000	Kitt Peak	Spacewatch	·	1.1 km	MPC · JPL
713377	2015 BA_{351}	—	May 8, 2011	Mount Lemmon	Mount Lemmon Survey	·	3.1 km	MPC · JPL
713378	2015 BE_{353}	—	January 18, 2015	Haleakala	Pan-STARRS 1	SYL	3.3 km	MPC · JPL
713379	2015 BD_{359}	—	January 20, 2015	Haleakala	Pan-STARRS 1	·	870 m	MPC · JPL
713380	2015 BP_{359}	—	January 20, 2015	Haleakala	Pan-STARRS 1	·	2.2 km	MPC · JPL
713381	2015 BB_{361}	—	December 26, 2014	Haleakala	Pan-STARRS 1	·	990 m	MPC · JPL
713382	2015 BQ_{361}	—	September 5, 2013	Kitt Peak	Spacewatch	·	1.5 km	MPC · JPL
713383	2015 BT_{368}	—	December 29, 2014	Haleakala	Pan-STARRS 1	VER	2.0 km	MPC · JPL
713384	2015 BE_{370}	—	January 20, 2015	Haleakala	Pan-STARRS 1	·	1.7 km	MPC · JPL
713385	2015 BQ_{371}	—	October 12, 2013	Mount Lemmon	Mount Lemmon Survey	·	1.7 km	MPC · JPL
713386	2015 BJ_{372}	—	October 4, 2013	Mount Lemmon	Mount Lemmon Survey	VER	2.5 km	MPC · JPL
713387	2015 BN_{375}	—	July 7, 2005	Kitt Peak	Spacewatch	NYS	930 m	MPC · JPL
713388	2015 BW_{376}	—	December 29, 2014	Haleakala	Pan-STARRS 1	·	2.2 km	MPC · JPL
713389	2015 BU_{382}	—	February 7, 2011	Mount Lemmon	Mount Lemmon Survey	·	970 m	MPC · JPL
713390	2015 BF_{387}	—	January 20, 2015	Haleakala	Pan-STARRS 1	·	1.0 km	MPC · JPL
713391	2015 BJ_{388}	—	November 9, 2013	Haleakala	Pan-STARRS 1	·	2.4 km	MPC · JPL
713392	2015 BX_{393}	—	September 6, 2013	Kitt Peak	Spacewatch	·	720 m	MPC · JPL
713393	2015 BA_{397}	—	August 16, 2009	Kitt Peak	Spacewatch	MAS	570 m	MPC · JPL
713394	2015 BX_{398}	—	October 14, 2009	Mount Lemmon	Mount Lemmon Survey	·	1.0 km	MPC · JPL
713395	2015 BP_{409}	—	September 25, 2003	Palomar	NEAT	·	780 m	MPC · JPL
713396	2015 BX_{411}	—	October 22, 2003	Kitt Peak	Spacewatch	·	590 m	MPC · JPL
713397	2015 BC_{415}	—	October 16, 2010	ESA OGS	ESA OGS	·	570 m	MPC · JPL
713398	2015 BX_{417}	—	January 20, 2015	Haleakala	Pan-STARRS 1	·	1.4 km	MPC · JPL
713399	2015 BH_{418}	—	January 20, 2015	Haleakala	Pan-STARRS 1	·	590 m	MPC · JPL
713400	2015 BH_{421}	—	November 8, 2010	Mount Lemmon	Mount Lemmon Survey	·	610 m	MPC · JPL

== 713401–713500 ==
back to top

Designation			Discovery			Properties		Ref
Permanent	Provisional	Named after	Date	Site	Discoverer(s)	Category	Diam.	Ref
713401	2015 BW_{426}	—	May 15, 2001	Kitt Peak	Spacewatch	·	930 m	MPC · JPL
713402	2015 BA_{428}	—	May 1, 2012	Kitt Peak	Spacewatch	V	560 m	MPC · JPL
713403	2015 BX_{430}	—	December 8, 2010	Mount Lemmon	Mount Lemmon Survey	·	1.2 km	MPC · JPL
713404	2015 BJ_{431}	—	January 23, 2011	Mount Lemmon	Mount Lemmon Survey	·	1.1 km	MPC · JPL
713405	2015 BE_{434}	—	August 25, 2012	Haleakala	Pan-STARRS 1	·	2.9 km	MPC · JPL
713406	2015 BJ_{434}	—	March 22, 2012	Mount Lemmon	Mount Lemmon Survey	·	860 m	MPC · JPL
713407	2015 BK_{434}	—	December 5, 2010	Kitt Peak	Spacewatch	·	940 m	MPC · JPL
713408	2015 BR_{439}	—	October 23, 2013	Mount Lemmon	Mount Lemmon Survey	(11882)	1.1 km	MPC · JPL
713409	2015 BH_{442}	—	August 17, 2012	Haleakala	Pan-STARRS 1	·	1.6 km	MPC · JPL
713410	2015 BE_{448}	—	August 4, 2008	Siding Spring	SSS	·	1.0 km	MPC · JPL
713411	2015 BY_{448}	—	January 20, 2015	Haleakala	Pan-STARRS 1	·	810 m	MPC · JPL
713412	2015 BR_{452}	—	August 22, 2004	Kitt Peak	Spacewatch	·	1.0 km	MPC · JPL
713413	2015 BB_{453}	—	July 12, 2005	Mount Lemmon	Mount Lemmon Survey	·	1.1 km	MPC · JPL
713414	2015 BF_{459}	—	September 4, 2008	Kitt Peak	Spacewatch	·	1.4 km	MPC · JPL
713415	2015 BO_{459}	—	August 27, 2009	Kitt Peak	Spacewatch	V	490 m	MPC · JPL
713416	2015 BR_{459}	—	January 20, 2015	Haleakala	Pan-STARRS 1	·	2.1 km	MPC · JPL
713417	2015 BQ_{460}	—	January 20, 2015	Haleakala	Pan-STARRS 1	·	510 m	MPC · JPL
713418	2015 BK_{461}	—	November 12, 2010	Mount Lemmon	Mount Lemmon Survey	·	600 m	MPC · JPL
713419	2015 BA_{462}	—	October 24, 2013	Mount Lemmon	Mount Lemmon Survey	·	970 m	MPC · JPL
713420	2015 BS_{462}	—	November 10, 2009	Mount Lemmon	Mount Lemmon Survey	·	740 m	MPC · JPL
713421	2015 BQ_{466}	—	January 20, 2015	Haleakala	Pan-STARRS 1	·	1.6 km	MPC · JPL
713422	2015 BT_{471}	—	March 16, 2012	Haleakala	Pan-STARRS 1	·	700 m	MPC · JPL
713423	2015 BX_{471}	—	April 1, 2012	Mount Lemmon	Mount Lemmon Survey	·	470 m	MPC · JPL
713424	2015 BX_{479}	—	January 20, 2015	Haleakala	Pan-STARRS 1	·	920 m	MPC · JPL
713425	2015 BE_{483}	—	August 12, 2013	Haleakala	Pan-STARRS 1	·	760 m	MPC · JPL
713426	2015 BB_{487}	—	January 20, 2015	Haleakala	Pan-STARRS 1	EOS	1.9 km	MPC · JPL
713427	2015 BT_{489}	—	December 3, 2010	Mount Lemmon	Mount Lemmon Survey	·	630 m	MPC · JPL
713428 Mirosławdziergas	2015 BX_{490}	Mirosławdziergas	August 30, 2013	Tincana	M. Kusiak, M. Żołnowski	·	1.1 km	MPC · JPL
713429	2015 BE_{491}	—	November 9, 2013	Mount Lemmon	Mount Lemmon Survey	·	1.5 km	MPC · JPL
713430	2015 BM_{491}	—	August 20, 2009	Kitt Peak	Spacewatch	MAS	630 m	MPC · JPL
713431	2015 BQ_{493}	—	September 16, 2010	Kitt Peak	Spacewatch	·	590 m	MPC · JPL
713432	2015 BE_{495}	—	February 26, 2009	Kitt Peak	Spacewatch	·	3.9 km	MPC · JPL
713433	2015 BK_{496}	—	March 28, 2001	Kitt Peak	Spacewatch	·	710 m	MPC · JPL
713434	2015 BR_{508}	—	May 6, 2006	Kitt Peak	Spacewatch	·	2.8 km	MPC · JPL
713435	2015 BX_{508}	—	January 12, 2011	Mount Lemmon	Mount Lemmon Survey	·	1.2 km	MPC · JPL
713436	2015 BA_{509}	—	September 25, 2006	Kitt Peak	Spacewatch	TIR	2.6 km	MPC · JPL
713437	2015 BV_{509}	—	October 28, 2014	Haleakala	Pan-STARRS 1	H	590 m	MPC · JPL
713438	2015 BR_{512}	—	December 25, 2014	Haleakala	Pan-STARRS 1	H	480 m	MPC · JPL
713439	2015 BR_{519}	—	August 3, 2013	Haleakala	Pan-STARRS 1	H	420 m	MPC · JPL
713440	2015 BP_{520}	—	March 16, 2004	Kitt Peak	Spacewatch	H	470 m	MPC · JPL
713441	2015 BM_{536}	—	January 16, 2015	Haleakala	Pan-STARRS 1	·	1.3 km	MPC · JPL
713442	2015 BY_{538}	—	January 7, 2009	Kitt Peak	Spacewatch	·	3.2 km	MPC · JPL
713443	2015 BV_{539}	—	January 22, 2015	Haleakala	Pan-STARRS 1	·	2.3 km	MPC · JPL
713444	2015 BT_{540}	—	January 25, 2015	Haleakala	Pan-STARRS 1	·	760 m	MPC · JPL
713445	2015 BE_{545}	—	January 20, 2015	Kitt Peak	Spacewatch	·	3.4 km	MPC · JPL
713446	2015 BS_{548}	—	November 18, 2009	Kitt Peak	Spacewatch	·	1.7 km	MPC · JPL
713447	2015 BW_{549}	—	January 20, 2015	Haleakala	Pan-STARRS 1	·	2.7 km	MPC · JPL
713448	2015 BF_{550}	—	March 11, 2003	Palomar	NEAT	·	1.1 km	MPC · JPL
713449	2015 BZ_{550}	—	October 23, 2013	Mount Lemmon	Mount Lemmon Survey	·	970 m	MPC · JPL
713450	2015 BK_{553}	—	January 16, 2015	Haleakala	Pan-STARRS 1	·	660 m	MPC · JPL
713451	2015 BL_{553}	—	December 26, 2006	Kitt Peak	Spacewatch	·	1.1 km	MPC · JPL
713452	2015 BY_{555}	—	November 16, 2014	Mount Lemmon	Mount Lemmon Survey	·	990 m	MPC · JPL
713453	2015 BG_{556}	—	February 20, 2009	Kitt Peak	Spacewatch	·	700 m	MPC · JPL
713454	2015 BC_{557}	—	February 7, 2008	Mount Lemmon	Mount Lemmon Survey	V	460 m	MPC · JPL
713455	2015 BE_{557}	—	January 17, 2015	Haleakala	Pan-STARRS 1	·	3.1 km	MPC · JPL
713456	2015 BY_{559}	—	November 22, 2014	Mount Lemmon	Mount Lemmon Survey	·	630 m	MPC · JPL
713457	2015 BL_{561}	—	December 11, 2014	Mount Lemmon	Mount Lemmon Survey	·	860 m	MPC · JPL
713458	2015 BM_{562}	—	November 26, 2013	Haleakala	Pan-STARRS 1	VER	2.6 km	MPC · JPL
713459	2015 BU_{562}	—	January 22, 2015	Haleakala	Pan-STARRS 1	·	2.0 km	MPC · JPL
713460	2015 BP_{566}	—	September 19, 2006	Kitt Peak	Spacewatch	·	620 m	MPC · JPL
713461	2015 BU_{566}	—	January 19, 2015	Mount Lemmon	Mount Lemmon Survey	·	730 m	MPC · JPL
713462	2015 BJ_{567}	—	November 18, 2008	Kitt Peak	Spacewatch	·	2.9 km	MPC · JPL
713463	2015 BP_{567}	—	January 10, 2007	Mount Lemmon	Mount Lemmon Survey	·	1.4 km	MPC · JPL
713464	2015 BS_{567}	—	January 20, 2015	Kitt Peak	Spacewatch	·	940 m	MPC · JPL
713465	2015 BM_{577}	—	January 18, 2015	Mount Lemmon	Mount Lemmon Survey	ULA	3.5 km	MPC · JPL
713466	2015 BP_{577}	—	January 28, 2015	Haleakala	Pan-STARRS 1	3:2	5.3 km	MPC · JPL
713467	2015 BH_{578}	—	November 7, 2008	Mount Lemmon	Mount Lemmon Survey	·	2.4 km	MPC · JPL
713468	2015 BY_{578}	—	January 18, 2015	Mount Lemmon	Mount Lemmon Survey	·	770 m	MPC · JPL
713469	2015 BS_{590}	—	January 22, 2015	Haleakala	Pan-STARRS 1	·	1.4 km	MPC · JPL
713470	2015 BU_{590}	—	January 21, 2015	Haleakala	Pan-STARRS 1	·	2.8 km	MPC · JPL
713471	2015 BF_{594}	—	January 16, 2015	Haleakala	Pan-STARRS 1	·	1.2 km	MPC · JPL
713472	2015 BJ_{598}	—	January 20, 2015	Haleakala	Pan-STARRS 1	VER	2.3 km	MPC · JPL
713473	2015 BV_{598}	—	January 22, 2015	Haleakala	Pan-STARRS 1	·	1.3 km	MPC · JPL
713474	2015 BZ_{605}	—	January 23, 2015	Haleakala	Pan-STARRS 1	·	880 m	MPC · JPL
713475	2015 BQ_{606}	—	January 28, 2015	Haleakala	Pan-STARRS 1	·	840 m	MPC · JPL
713476	2015 BS_{606}	—	January 20, 2015	Haleakala	Pan-STARRS 1	·	2.2 km	MPC · JPL
713477	2015 BV_{606}	—	January 21, 2015	Haleakala	Pan-STARRS 1	·	910 m	MPC · JPL
713478	2015 BV_{607}	—	January 20, 2015	Haleakala	Pan-STARRS 1	SYL	3.4 km	MPC · JPL
713479	2015 BJ_{608}	—	January 19, 2015	Mount Lemmon	Mount Lemmon Survey	·	2.4 km	MPC · JPL
713480	2015 CW_{1}	—	January 20, 2015	Haleakala	Pan-STARRS 1	·	920 m	MPC · JPL
713481	2015 CE_{4}	—	January 22, 2015	Haleakala	Pan-STARRS 1	·	800 m	MPC · JPL
713482	2015 CY_{4}	—	July 28, 2005	Palomar	NEAT	H	480 m	MPC · JPL
713483	2015 CZ_{5}	—	July 30, 2009	Kitt Peak	Spacewatch	·	1.3 km	MPC · JPL
713484	2015 CV_{8}	—	December 29, 2003	Kitt Peak	Spacewatch	·	830 m	MPC · JPL
713485	2015 CO_{18}	—	May 1, 2012	Mount Lemmon	Mount Lemmon Survey	·	620 m	MPC · JPL
713486	2015 CT_{20}	—	January 1, 2009	Kitt Peak	Spacewatch	HYG	2.3 km	MPC · JPL
713487	2015 CF_{21}	—	January 20, 2015	Haleakala	Pan-STARRS 1	·	500 m	MPC · JPL
713488	2015 CZ_{23}	—	January 30, 2008	Mount Lemmon	Mount Lemmon Survey	·	790 m	MPC · JPL
713489	2015 CD_{25}	—	February 8, 2011	Mount Lemmon	Mount Lemmon Survey	·	1.1 km	MPC · JPL
713490	2015 CB_{27}	—	October 15, 2013	Mount Lemmon	Mount Lemmon Survey	·	1.2 km	MPC · JPL
713491	2015 CV_{27}	—	January 7, 2006	Mount Lemmon	Mount Lemmon Survey	·	1.1 km	MPC · JPL
713492	2015 CY_{30}	—	January 17, 2015	Mount Lemmon	Mount Lemmon Survey	·	960 m	MPC · JPL
713493	2015 CX_{32}	—	February 8, 2008	Kitt Peak	Spacewatch	·	720 m	MPC · JPL
713494	2015 CY_{37}	—	October 31, 2006	Kitt Peak	Spacewatch	·	910 m	MPC · JPL
713495	2015 CR_{41}	—	May 3, 2011	Mayhill-ISON	L. Elenin	·	3.5 km	MPC · JPL
713496	2015 CT_{45}	—	December 16, 2007	Mount Lemmon	Mount Lemmon Survey	·	580 m	MPC · JPL
713497	2015 CN_{46}	—	January 11, 2008	Kitt Peak	Spacewatch	·	730 m	MPC · JPL
713498	2015 CT_{46}	—	August 12, 2008	Pla D'Arguines	R. Ferrando, Ferrando, M.	·	1.1 km	MPC · JPL
713499	2015 CE_{48}	—	July 28, 2009	Kitt Peak	Spacewatch	·	990 m	MPC · JPL
713500	2015 CQ_{51}	—	August 18, 2012	Charleston	R. Holmes	·	1.2 km	MPC · JPL

== 713501–713600 ==
back to top

Designation			Discovery			Properties		Ref
Permanent	Provisional	Named after	Date	Site	Discoverer(s)	Category	Diam.	Ref
713501	2015 CB_{52}	—	January 18, 2004	Palomar	NEAT	·	2.5 km	MPC · JPL
713502	2015 CO_{53}	—	April 4, 2008	Kitt Peak	Spacewatch	·	910 m	MPC · JPL
713503	2015 CA_{54}	—	September 25, 2012	Mount Lemmon	Mount Lemmon Survey	EOS	1.6 km	MPC · JPL
713504	2015 CM_{54}	—	March 26, 2008	Mount Lemmon	Mount Lemmon Survey	·	810 m	MPC · JPL
713505	2015 CR_{57}	—	February 13, 2011	Mount Lemmon	Mount Lemmon Survey	·	840 m	MPC · JPL
713506	2015 CT_{60}	—	December 18, 2014	Haleakala	Pan-STARRS 1	H	400 m	MPC · JPL
713507	2015 CA_{64}	—	January 25, 2006	Kitt Peak	Spacewatch	PAD	1.2 km	MPC · JPL
713508	2015 CK_{65}	—	January 22, 2015	Haleakala	Pan-STARRS 1	(5)	800 m	MPC · JPL
713509	2015 CZ_{67}	—	August 25, 2012	Kitt Peak	Spacewatch	VER	2.3 km	MPC · JPL
713510	2015 CA_{69}	—	January 20, 2015	Haleakala	Pan-STARRS 1	KOR	1.1 km	MPC · JPL
713511	2015 CD_{69}	—	January 16, 2015	Haleakala	Pan-STARRS 1	EOS	1.6 km	MPC · JPL
713512	2015 CE_{70}	—	October 14, 2009	Mount Lemmon	Mount Lemmon Survey	·	880 m	MPC · JPL
713513	2015 CZ_{80}	—	February 14, 2015	Mount Lemmon	Mount Lemmon Survey	·	1.1 km	MPC · JPL
713514	2015 CO_{83}	—	February 8, 2015	Mount Lemmon	Mount Lemmon Survey	·	2.7 km	MPC · JPL
713515	2015 DQ_{2}	—	December 2, 2008	Kitt Peak	Spacewatch	VER	2.3 km	MPC · JPL
713516	2015 DG_{9}	—	January 16, 2015	Haleakala	Pan-STARRS 1	·	3.3 km	MPC · JPL
713517	2015 DT_{9}	—	November 14, 2007	Kitt Peak	Spacewatch	·	520 m	MPC · JPL
713518	2015 DG_{10}	—	December 21, 2014	Haleakala	Pan-STARRS 1	·	2.7 km	MPC · JPL
713519	2015 DH_{16}	—	January 20, 2015	Haleakala	Pan-STARRS 1	·	2.5 km	MPC · JPL
713520	2015 DL_{18}	—	January 27, 2015	Haleakala	Pan-STARRS 1	·	970 m	MPC · JPL
713521	2015 DU_{18}	—	April 15, 2012	Haleakala	Pan-STARRS 1	·	850 m	MPC · JPL
713522	2015 DG_{30}	—	January 27, 2015	Haleakala	Pan-STARRS 1	·	1.1 km	MPC · JPL
713523	2015 DO_{30}	—	October 12, 2013	Catalina	CSS	V	690 m	MPC · JPL
713524	2015 DO_{31}	—	August 30, 2009	Kitt Peak	Spacewatch	·	1.3 km	MPC · JPL
713525	2015 DB_{32}	—	March 26, 2001	Kitt Peak	Spacewatch	·	900 m	MPC · JPL
713526	2015 DJ_{34}	—	February 16, 2015	Haleakala	Pan-STARRS 1	·	490 m	MPC · JPL
713527	2015 DO_{35}	—	December 13, 2010	Mount Lemmon	Mount Lemmon Survey	NYS	710 m	MPC · JPL
713528	2015 DJ_{39}	—	April 6, 2011	Mount Lemmon	Mount Lemmon Survey	·	1.4 km	MPC · JPL
713529	2015 DV_{40}	—	February 16, 2015	Haleakala	Pan-STARRS 1	·	960 m	MPC · JPL
713530	2015 DZ_{40}	—	December 24, 2013	Mount Lemmon	Mount Lemmon Survey	EOS	1.5 km	MPC · JPL
713531	2015 DH_{41}	—	September 26, 2006	Mount Lemmon	Mount Lemmon Survey	·	850 m	MPC · JPL
713532	2015 DA_{43}	—	February 16, 2015	Haleakala	Pan-STARRS 1	·	1.1 km	MPC · JPL
713533	2015 DK_{43}	—	February 16, 2015	Haleakala	Pan-STARRS 1	·	810 m	MPC · JPL
713534	2015 DC_{44}	—	April 24, 2007	Mount Lemmon	Mount Lemmon Survey	·	800 m	MPC · JPL
713535	2015 DS_{44}	—	January 26, 2011	Mount Lemmon	Mount Lemmon Survey	·	1.0 km	MPC · JPL
713536	2015 DX_{46}	—	January 13, 2011	Kitt Peak	Spacewatch	V	570 m	MPC · JPL
713537	2015 DO_{47}	—	March 28, 2008	Kitt Peak	Spacewatch	V	590 m	MPC · JPL
713538	2015 DX_{48}	—	February 16, 2015	Haleakala	Pan-STARRS 1	·	1.0 km	MPC · JPL
713539	2015 DF_{49}	—	February 13, 2008	Mount Lemmon	Mount Lemmon Survey	·	810 m	MPC · JPL
713540	2015 DP_{49}	—	April 22, 2009	Mount Lemmon	Mount Lemmon Survey	·	620 m	MPC · JPL
713541	2015 DD_{53}	—	January 30, 2011	Mount Lemmon	Mount Lemmon Survey	V	600 m	MPC · JPL
713542	2015 DX_{54}	—	September 13, 2007	Catalina	CSS	·	2.8 km	MPC · JPL
713543	2015 DT_{58}	—	September 11, 2005	Kitt Peak	Spacewatch	MAS	660 m	MPC · JPL
713544	2015 DB_{60}	—	February 12, 2000	Apache Point	SDSS Collaboration	·	960 m	MPC · JPL
713545	2015 DE_{62}	—	January 14, 2008	Kitt Peak	Spacewatch	ULA	3.9 km	MPC · JPL
713546	2015 DZ_{63}	—	June 24, 2009	Mount Lemmon	Mount Lemmon Survey	·	580 m	MPC · JPL
713547	2015 DE_{69}	—	July 30, 2013	Kitt Peak	Spacewatch	·	660 m	MPC · JPL
713548	2015 DT_{69}	—	April 9, 2003	Kitt Peak	Spacewatch	·	1.3 km	MPC · JPL
713549	2015 DU_{69}	—	February 10, 2008	Kitt Peak	Spacewatch	·	920 m	MPC · JPL
713550	2015 DL_{72}	—	February 13, 2008	Mount Lemmon	Mount Lemmon Survey	·	910 m	MPC · JPL
713551	2015 DP_{72}	—	February 16, 2015	Haleakala	Pan-STARRS 1	·	1.5 km	MPC · JPL
713552	2015 DV_{72}	—	September 29, 2005	Mount Lemmon	Mount Lemmon Survey	·	730 m	MPC · JPL
713553	2015 DH_{73}	—	June 21, 2004	Piszkéstető	K. Sárneczky	·	1.1 km	MPC · JPL
713554	2015 DJ_{73}	—	November 20, 2006	Mount Lemmon	Mount Lemmon Survey	·	1.0 km	MPC · JPL
713555	2015 DL_{74}	—	February 8, 2011	Mount Lemmon	Mount Lemmon Survey	·	910 m	MPC · JPL
713556	2015 DM_{75}	—	January 20, 2015	Haleakala	Pan-STARRS 1	MAS	580 m	MPC · JPL
713557	2015 DQ_{81}	—	November 15, 2006	Kitt Peak	Spacewatch	·	1.1 km	MPC · JPL
713558	2015 DY_{82}	—	January 21, 2015	Haleakala	Pan-STARRS 1	·	880 m	MPC · JPL
713559	2015 DQ_{83}	—	October 2, 2006	Mount Lemmon	Mount Lemmon Survey	·	730 m	MPC · JPL
713560	2015 DU_{88}	—	January 20, 2015	Haleakala	Pan-STARRS 1	·	3.2 km	MPC · JPL
713561	2015 DM_{96}	—	February 16, 2015	Haleakala	Pan-STARRS 1	·	1.0 km	MPC · JPL
713562	2015 DY_{100}	—	January 25, 2015	Mount Lemmon	Mount Lemmon Survey	V	400 m	MPC · JPL
713563	2015 DB_{102}	—	March 25, 2012	Kitt Peak	Spacewatch	·	1.0 km	MPC · JPL
713564	2015 DT_{104}	—	October 21, 2007	Kitt Peak	Spacewatch	·	3.1 km	MPC · JPL
713565	2015 DD_{105}	—	October 28, 2010	Mount Lemmon	Mount Lemmon Survey	·	820 m	MPC · JPL
713566	2015 DQ_{105}	—	November 6, 2013	Haleakala	Pan-STARRS 1	·	2.7 km	MPC · JPL
713567	2015 DR_{105}	—	November 26, 2013	Haleakala	Pan-STARRS 1	·	3.0 km	MPC · JPL
713568	2015 DR_{106}	—	January 9, 2011	Mount Lemmon	Mount Lemmon Survey	·	900 m	MPC · JPL
713569	2015 DA_{108}	—	December 15, 2001	Apache Point	SDSS Collaboration	·	4.0 km	MPC · JPL
713570	2015 DJ_{119}	—	August 31, 2013	Tincana	Zolnowski, M., Kusiak, M.	·	1.3 km	MPC · JPL
713571	2015 DY_{120}	—	February 17, 2015	Haleakala	Pan-STARRS 1	·	770 m	MPC · JPL
713572	2015 DK_{122}	—	November 26, 2014	Haleakala	Pan-STARRS 1	·	1.3 km	MPC · JPL
713573	2015 DD_{123}	—	January 8, 2002	Kitt Peak	Spacewatch	·	1.1 km	MPC · JPL
713574	2015 DW_{123}	—	August 3, 2008	Siding Spring	SSS	·	1.3 km	MPC · JPL
713575	2015 DG_{125}	—	January 28, 2015	Haleakala	Pan-STARRS 1	·	1.4 km	MPC · JPL
713576	2015 DD_{126}	—	January 28, 2015	Haleakala	Pan-STARRS 1	EUN	950 m	MPC · JPL
713577	2015 DE_{130}	—	January 28, 2015	Haleakala	Pan-STARRS 1	EUN	1.0 km	MPC · JPL
713578	2015 DZ_{132}	—	February 17, 2015	Haleakala	Pan-STARRS 1	·	1.0 km	MPC · JPL
713579	2015 DM_{135}	—	December 9, 2006	Kitt Peak	Spacewatch	PHO	820 m	MPC · JPL
713580	2015 DD_{136}	—	November 9, 2013	Kitt Peak	Spacewatch	·	1.3 km	MPC · JPL
713581	2015 DP_{139}	—	February 20, 2009	Kitt Peak	Spacewatch	·	610 m	MPC · JPL
713582	2015 DP_{144}	—	February 14, 2010	Kitt Peak	Spacewatch	VER	2.8 km	MPC · JPL
713583	2015 DX_{145}	—	November 25, 2014	Haleakala	Pan-STARRS 1	·	3.3 km	MPC · JPL
713584	2015 DS_{146}	—	September 15, 2006	Kitt Peak	Spacewatch	V	570 m	MPC · JPL
713585	2015 DV_{149}	—	March 16, 2012	Haleakala	Pan-STARRS 1	·	550 m	MPC · JPL
713586	2015 DV_{155}	—	May 11, 2003	Anderson Mesa	LONEOS	H	560 m	MPC · JPL
713587	2015 DY_{159}	—	October 18, 2009	Mount Lemmon	Mount Lemmon Survey	·	1.0 km	MPC · JPL
713588	2015 DM_{160}	—	May 26, 2003	Kitt Peak	Spacewatch	·	1.1 km	MPC · JPL
713589	2015 DR_{161}	—	January 27, 2015	Haleakala	Pan-STARRS 1	BRG	1.2 km	MPC · JPL
713590	2015 DX_{161}	—	February 18, 2015	Mount Lemmon	Mount Lemmon Survey	·	1.1 km	MPC · JPL
713591	2015 DY_{161}	—	November 30, 2014	Haleakala	Pan-STARRS 1	·	1.2 km	MPC · JPL
713592	2015 DV_{162}	—	July 7, 2000	Kitt Peak	Spacewatch	·	1.3 km	MPC · JPL
713593	2015 DM_{167}	—	March 12, 2008	Kitt Peak	Spacewatch	·	940 m	MPC · JPL
713594	2015 DU_{176}	—	January 3, 2009	Mount Lemmon	Mount Lemmon Survey	·	2.9 km	MPC · JPL
713595	2015 DL_{177}	—	December 31, 2008	Mount Lemmon	Mount Lemmon Survey	·	3.4 km	MPC · JPL
713596	2015 DQ_{179}	—	November 21, 2005	Kitt Peak	Spacewatch	·	1.5 km	MPC · JPL
713597	2015 DN_{181}	—	February 11, 2008	Mount Lemmon	Mount Lemmon Survey	·	740 m	MPC · JPL
713598	2015 DJ_{186}	—	December 24, 2005	Kitt Peak	Spacewatch	·	1.1 km	MPC · JPL
713599	2015 DR_{186}	—	January 15, 2015	Haleakala	Pan-STARRS 1	·	850 m	MPC · JPL
713600	2015 DK_{191}	—	August 27, 2013	Haleakala	Pan-STARRS 1	·	710 m	MPC · JPL

== 713601–713700 ==
back to top

Designation			Discovery			Properties		Ref
Permanent	Provisional	Named after	Date	Site	Discoverer(s)	Category	Diam.	Ref
713601	2015 DS_{192}	—	January 20, 2015	Haleakala	Pan-STARRS 1	·	900 m	MPC · JPL
713602	2015 DC_{197}	—	February 9, 2008	Catalina	CSS	·	760 m	MPC · JPL
713603	2015 DH_{199}	—	February 24, 2015	Haleakala	Pan-STARRS 1	H	670 m	MPC · JPL
713604	2015 DA_{203}	—	November 11, 2007	Mount Lemmon	Mount Lemmon Survey	·	590 m	MPC · JPL
713605	2015 DA_{207}	—	January 29, 2009	Kitt Peak	Spacewatch	·	2.2 km	MPC · JPL
713606	2015 DJ_{208}	—	March 3, 2008	XuYi	PMO NEO Survey Program	·	740 m	MPC · JPL
713607	2015 DU_{208}	—	April 2, 2011	Mount Lemmon	Mount Lemmon Survey	·	1.4 km	MPC · JPL
713608	2015 DD_{213}	—	September 23, 2011	Haleakala	Pan-STARRS 1	·	2.7 km	MPC · JPL
713609	2015 DP_{215}	—	February 16, 2015	Haleakala	Pan-STARRS 1	H	640 m	MPC · JPL
713610	2015 DT_{218}	—	April 28, 2008	Catalina	CSS	PHO	970 m	MPC · JPL
713611	2015 DA_{219}	—	September 20, 2003	Kitt Peak	Spacewatch	·	670 m	MPC · JPL
713612	2015 DM_{219}	—	March 8, 2005	Kitt Peak	Spacewatch	·	590 m	MPC · JPL
713613	2015 DS_{222}	—	October 1, 2005	Mount Lemmon	Mount Lemmon Survey	·	3.7 km	MPC · JPL
713614	2015 DT_{222}	—	February 11, 2015	Kitt Peak	Spacewatch	·	660 m	MPC · JPL
713615	2015 DM_{228}	—	February 27, 2015	Haleakala	Pan-STARRS 1	JUN	760 m	MPC · JPL
713616	2015 DU_{230}	—	November 25, 2006	Mount Lemmon	Mount Lemmon Survey	·	890 m	MPC · JPL
713617	2015 DW_{230}	—	August 20, 2009	Kitt Peak	Spacewatch	·	930 m	MPC · JPL
713618	2015 DU_{231}	—	October 15, 2012	Kitt Peak	Spacewatch	·	1.6 km	MPC · JPL
713619	2015 DB_{232}	—	December 26, 2006	Kitt Peak	Spacewatch	·	900 m	MPC · JPL
713620	2015 DP_{234}	—	November 24, 2009	Kitt Peak	Spacewatch	·	920 m	MPC · JPL
713621	2015 DE_{245}	—	January 28, 2015	Haleakala	Pan-STARRS 1	·	1.4 km	MPC · JPL
713622	2015 DJ_{245}	—	February 23, 2015	Haleakala	Pan-STARRS 1	·	1.3 km	MPC · JPL
713623	2015 DF_{246}	—	February 24, 2015	Haleakala	Pan-STARRS 1	·	1.1 km	MPC · JPL
713624	2015 DO_{246}	—	January 25, 2015	Haleakala	Pan-STARRS 1	EUN	870 m	MPC · JPL
713625	2015 DU_{246}	—	January 22, 2015	Haleakala	Pan-STARRS 1	·	1.1 km	MPC · JPL
713626	2015 DO_{250}	—	February 18, 2015	Mount Lemmon	Mount Lemmon Survey	·	910 m	MPC · JPL
713627	2015 DK_{265}	—	October 20, 2008	Mount Lemmon	Mount Lemmon Survey	·	1.3 km	MPC · JPL
713628	2015 DK_{267}	—	February 16, 2015	Haleakala	Pan-STARRS 1	·	1.4 km	MPC · JPL
713629	2015 DW_{271}	—	February 24, 2015	Haleakala	Pan-STARRS 1	·	680 m	MPC · JPL
713630	2015 DG_{272}	—	February 25, 2015	Haleakala	Pan-STARRS 1	·	830 m	MPC · JPL
713631	2015 DS_{272}	—	March 16, 2007	Mount Lemmon	Mount Lemmon Survey	·	840 m	MPC · JPL
713632	2015 DB_{273}	—	February 16, 2015	Haleakala	Pan-STARRS 1	·	2.9 km	MPC · JPL
713633	2015 DY_{276}	—	February 23, 2015	Haleakala	Pan-STARRS 1	·	960 m	MPC · JPL
713634	2015 DC_{283}	—	January 23, 2015	Haleakala	Pan-STARRS 1	L4	6.7 km	MPC · JPL
713635	2015 DO_{287}	—	February 25, 2015	Haleakala	Pan-STARRS 1	·	1.4 km	MPC · JPL
713636	2015 DR_{287}	—	February 18, 2015	Mount Lemmon	Mount Lemmon Survey	·	740 m	MPC · JPL
713637	2015 DT_{287}	—	February 16, 2015	Haleakala	Pan-STARRS 1	·	3.2 km	MPC · JPL
713638	2015 DF_{291}	—	January 21, 2015	Haleakala	Pan-STARRS 1	3:2 · SHU	3.9 km	MPC · JPL
713639	2015 DF_{293}	—	February 19, 2015	Haleakala	Pan-STARRS 1	L4	6.9 km	MPC · JPL
713640	2015 DO_{294}	—	February 18, 2015	Kitt Peak	Research and Education Collaborative Occultation Network	·	2.1 km	MPC · JPL
713641	2015 DW_{294}	—	January 21, 2015	Haleakala	Pan-STARRS 1	·	850 m	MPC · JPL
713642	2015 DE_{295}	—	February 16, 2015	Haleakala	Pan-STARRS 1	·	1.0 km	MPC · JPL
713643	2015 DT_{296}	—	February 16, 2015	Haleakala	Pan-STARRS 1	·	1.3 km	MPC · JPL
713644	2015 DN_{299}	—	February 18, 2015	Haleakala	Pan-STARRS 1	L4	7.2 km	MPC · JPL
713645	2015 DM_{303}	—	January 23, 2015	Haleakala	Pan-STARRS 1	·	1.5 km	MPC · JPL
713646	2015 DD_{306}	—	February 18, 2015	Haleakala	Pan-STARRS 1	BRA	1.1 km	MPC · JPL
713647	2015 DS_{318}	—	February 24, 2015	Haleakala	Pan-STARRS 1	·	1.5 km	MPC · JPL
713648	2015 EA_{2}	—	September 26, 2006	Mount Lemmon	Mount Lemmon Survey	·	830 m	MPC · JPL
713649	2015 EW_{2}	—	January 18, 2015	Haleakala	Pan-STARRS 1	·	2.4 km	MPC · JPL
713650	2015 EF_{5}	—	November 25, 2005	Catalina	CSS	T_{j} (2.99) · 3:2	4.7 km	MPC · JPL
713651	2015 ED_{6}	—	October 9, 2010	Mount Lemmon	Mount Lemmon Survey	·	600 m	MPC · JPL
713652	2015 EW_{8}	—	February 25, 2011	Kitt Peak	Spacewatch	·	720 m	MPC · JPL
713653	2015 EW_{12}	—	September 17, 2010	Mount Lemmon	Mount Lemmon Survey	·	600 m	MPC · JPL
713654	2015 ER_{16}	—	September 15, 2006	Kitt Peak	Spacewatch	PHO	590 m	MPC · JPL
713655	2015 EH_{18}	—	October 3, 2006	Mount Lemmon	Mount Lemmon Survey	·	990 m	MPC · JPL
713656	2015 EP_{18}	—	January 23, 2015	Haleakala	Pan-STARRS 1	·	940 m	MPC · JPL
713657	2015 ES_{19}	—	March 26, 2003	Palomar	NEAT	EUN	960 m	MPC · JPL
713658	2015 ET_{20}	—	January 29, 2011	Mount Lemmon	Mount Lemmon Survey	MAS	530 m	MPC · JPL
713659	2015 ED_{21}	—	August 27, 2005	Palomar	NEAT	H	490 m	MPC · JPL
713660	2015 EM_{23}	—	February 17, 2015	Haleakala	Pan-STARRS 1	·	2.3 km	MPC · JPL
713661	2015 EK_{24}	—	January 29, 2003	Apache Point	SDSS Collaboration	·	960 m	MPC · JPL
713662	2015 EQ_{24}	—	October 20, 1998	Kitt Peak	Spacewatch	NYS	870 m	MPC · JPL
713663	2015 EB_{30}	—	February 10, 2015	Mount Lemmon	Mount Lemmon Survey	·	1.1 km	MPC · JPL
713664	2015 EU_{30}	—	November 10, 2013	Kitt Peak	Spacewatch	·	1.1 km	MPC · JPL
713665	2015 EO_{31}	—	February 17, 2015	Haleakala	Pan-STARRS 1	·	1.3 km	MPC · JPL
713666	2015 EB_{48}	—	November 7, 2005	Mauna Kea	A. Boattini	·	1.4 km	MPC · JPL
713667	2015 EB_{50}	—	February 24, 2015	Haleakala	Pan-STARRS 1	·	1.2 km	MPC · JPL
713668	2015 EF_{52}	—	November 10, 2009	Mount Lemmon	Mount Lemmon Survey	·	1.2 km	MPC · JPL
713669	2015 EP_{56}	—	January 25, 2015	Haleakala	Pan-STARRS 1	·	1.1 km	MPC · JPL
713670	2015 EO_{60}	—	February 18, 2015	Haleakala	Pan-STARRS 1	BRA	1.5 km	MPC · JPL
713671	2015 EB_{61}	—	March 15, 2015	Haleakala	Pan-STARRS 1	·	1.1 km	MPC · JPL
713672	2015 EJ_{61}	—	February 20, 2015	Haleakala	Pan-STARRS 1	MAR	920 m	MPC · JPL
713673	2015 EA_{64}	—	March 14, 2004	Palomar	NEAT	PHO	840 m	MPC · JPL
713674	2015 ET_{64}	—	March 21, 2015	Haleakala	Pan-STARRS 1	HNS	1.1 km	MPC · JPL
713675	2015 EH_{66}	—	January 28, 2007	Kitt Peak	Spacewatch	·	1.2 km	MPC · JPL
713676	2015 EU_{67}	—	February 13, 2015	Mount Lemmon	Mount Lemmon Survey	·	790 m	MPC · JPL
713677	2015 EV_{71}	—	July 7, 2003	Palomar	NEAT	·	1.3 km	MPC · JPL
713678	2015 EF_{72}	—	January 16, 2015	Haleakala	Pan-STARRS 1	·	1.0 km	MPC · JPL
713679	2015 EX_{76}	—	October 11, 2012	Mount Lemmon	Mount Lemmon Survey	·	3.4 km	MPC · JPL
713680	2015 FN_{4}	—	September 28, 2013	Mount Lemmon	Mount Lemmon Survey	·	2.7 km	MPC · JPL
713681	2015 FL_{6}	—	August 6, 2005	Palomar	NEAT	H	510 m	MPC · JPL
713682	2015 FT_{6}	—	October 28, 2014	Haleakala	Pan-STARRS 1	·	3.1 km	MPC · JPL
713683	2015 FJ_{7}	—	October 8, 2007	Catalina	CSS	·	3.2 km	MPC · JPL
713684	2015 FL_{12}	—	January 3, 2014	Kitt Peak	Spacewatch	EMA	2.8 km	MPC · JPL
713685	2015 FW_{17}	—	April 27, 2011	Mount Lemmon	Mount Lemmon Survey	·	1.4 km	MPC · JPL
713686	2015 FH_{19}	—	March 16, 2015	Haleakala	Pan-STARRS 1	·	960 m	MPC · JPL
713687	2015 FA_{21}	—	March 16, 2015	Haleakala	Pan-STARRS 1	PHO	850 m	MPC · JPL
713688	2015 FO_{23}	—	March 16, 2015	Haleakala	Pan-STARRS 1	PHO	850 m	MPC · JPL
713689	2015 FO_{25}	—	February 20, 2015	Haleakala	Pan-STARRS 1	T_{j} (2.99) · EUP	3.1 km	MPC · JPL
713690	2015 FC_{27}	—	February 23, 2015	Haleakala	Pan-STARRS 1	PHO	970 m	MPC · JPL
713691	2015 FN_{28}	—	April 9, 2003	Kitt Peak	Spacewatch	EUN	970 m	MPC · JPL
713692	2015 FB_{32}	—	March 16, 2015	Haleakala	Pan-STARRS 1	EUN	870 m	MPC · JPL
713693	2015 FY_{32}	—	November 1, 2005	Catalina	CSS	·	1.4 km	MPC · JPL
713694	2015 FP_{37}	—	February 16, 2015	Haleakala	Pan-STARRS 1	·	1.1 km	MPC · JPL
713695	2015 FO_{38}	—	April 12, 2002	Kitt Peak	Spacewatch	·	1.4 km	MPC · JPL
713696	2015 FR_{41}	—	October 21, 2006	Mount Lemmon	Mount Lemmon Survey	·	2.4 km	MPC · JPL
713697	2015 FC_{43}	—	May 13, 2011	Mount Lemmon	Mount Lemmon Survey	·	1.2 km	MPC · JPL
713698	2015 FF_{44}	—	March 17, 2015	Haleakala	Pan-STARRS 1	3:2	3.8 km	MPC · JPL
713699	2015 FV_{44}	—	March 4, 2011	Kitt Peak	Spacewatch	NYS	1.0 km	MPC · JPL
713700	2015 FM_{53}	—	November 21, 2014	Haleakala	Pan-STARRS 1	H	450 m	MPC · JPL

== 713701–713800 ==
back to top

Designation			Discovery			Properties		Ref
Permanent	Provisional	Named after	Date	Site	Discoverer(s)	Category	Diam.	Ref
713701	2015 FA_{55}	—	January 24, 2015	Haleakala	Pan-STARRS 1	·	1.3 km	MPC · JPL
713702	2015 FY_{62}	—	November 10, 2013	Mount Lemmon	Mount Lemmon Survey	·	920 m	MPC · JPL
713703	2015 FH_{63}	—	December 5, 2005	Kitt Peak	Spacewatch	MAR	860 m	MPC · JPL
713704	2015 FO_{67}	—	January 20, 2015	Haleakala	Pan-STARRS 1	·	1.2 km	MPC · JPL
713705	2015 FS_{69}	—	October 23, 2012	Nogales	M. Schwartz, P. R. Holvorcem	·	1.8 km	MPC · JPL
713706	2015 FH_{72}	—	March 17, 2015	Haleakala	Pan-STARRS 1	·	910 m	MPC · JPL
713707	2015 FN_{73}	—	March 18, 2015	Haleakala	Pan-STARRS 1	·	1.4 km	MPC · JPL
713708	2015 FJ_{77}	—	September 16, 2009	Kitt Peak	Spacewatch	(5)	970 m	MPC · JPL
713709	2015 FC_{79}	—	March 18, 2015	Haleakala	Pan-STARRS 1	H	460 m	MPC · JPL
713710	2015 FF_{80}	—	January 24, 2015	Haleakala	Pan-STARRS 1	·	990 m	MPC · JPL
713711	2015 FW_{81}	—	August 1, 2000	Socorro	LINEAR	EUN	1.6 km	MPC · JPL
713712	2015 FD_{88}	—	February 24, 2015	Haleakala	Pan-STARRS 1	·	860 m	MPC · JPL
713713	2015 FM_{88}	—	January 23, 2006	Kitt Peak	Spacewatch	JUN	790 m	MPC · JPL
713714	2015 FZ_{90}	—	October 10, 2012	Mount Lemmon	Mount Lemmon Survey	·	1.5 km	MPC · JPL
713715	2015 FT_{92}	—	November 1, 2013	Kitt Peak	Spacewatch	·	930 m	MPC · JPL
713716	2015 FC_{98}	—	April 15, 2007	Kitt Peak	Spacewatch	·	1.2 km	MPC · JPL
713717	2015 FD_{99}	—	March 21, 2015	Haleakala	Pan-STARRS 1	·	960 m	MPC · JPL
713718	2015 FC_{101}	—	September 29, 2009	Kitt Peak	Spacewatch	·	740 m	MPC · JPL
713719	2015 FA_{103}	—	March 2, 2011	Mount Lemmon	Mount Lemmon Survey	·	1.2 km	MPC · JPL
713720	2015 FT_{106}	—	February 11, 2011	Mount Lemmon	Mount Lemmon Survey	·	1.1 km	MPC · JPL
713721	2015 FN_{107}	—	October 10, 2012	Haleakala	Pan-STARRS 1	·	1.5 km	MPC · JPL
713722	2015 FP_{109}	—	March 20, 2015	Haleakala	Pan-STARRS 1	·	940 m	MPC · JPL
713723	2015 FJ_{110}	—	October 24, 2009	Kitt Peak	Spacewatch	·	980 m	MPC · JPL
713724	2015 FU_{110}	—	September 26, 2006	Kitt Peak	Spacewatch	·	2.1 km	MPC · JPL
713725	2015 FH_{111}	—	March 20, 2015	Haleakala	Pan-STARRS 1	·	920 m	MPC · JPL
713726	2015 FC_{115}	—	November 9, 2013	Mount Lemmon	Mount Lemmon Survey	·	560 m	MPC · JPL
713727	2015 FD_{115}	—	January 23, 2015	Haleakala	Pan-STARRS 1	·	1.1 km	MPC · JPL
713728	2015 FS_{116}	—	February 27, 2015	Haleakala	Pan-STARRS 1	MAR	1.0 km	MPC · JPL
713729	2015 FZ_{116}	—	March 21, 2015	Haleakala	Pan-STARRS 1	·	950 m	MPC · JPL
713730	2015 FA_{120}	—	May 16, 2007	Mount Lemmon	Mount Lemmon Survey	·	1.2 km	MPC · JPL
713731	2015 FR_{120}	—	August 30, 2011	Haleakala	Pan-STARRS 1	·	3.4 km	MPC · JPL
713732	2015 FK_{121}	—	October 18, 2003	Kitt Peak	Spacewatch	·	690 m	MPC · JPL
713733	2015 FH_{123}	—	January 26, 2007	Kitt Peak	Spacewatch	·	950 m	MPC · JPL
713734	2015 FT_{126}	—	November 8, 2007	Kitt Peak	Spacewatch	·	690 m	MPC · JPL
713735	2015 FX_{126}	—	May 26, 2008	Kitt Peak	Spacewatch	·	1.4 km	MPC · JPL
713736	2015 FN_{128}	—	November 30, 2014	Haleakala	Pan-STARRS 1	·	1.1 km	MPC · JPL
713737	2015 FU_{128}	—	November 9, 2013	Mount Lemmon	Mount Lemmon Survey	EUN	1.3 km	MPC · JPL
713738	2015 FC_{131}	—	March 14, 2015	Mount Lemmon	Mount Lemmon Survey	·	2.8 km	MPC · JPL
713739	2015 FN_{135}	—	January 28, 2011	Mount Lemmon	Mount Lemmon Survey	·	1.1 km	MPC · JPL
713740	2015 FE_{138}	—	March 21, 2015	Haleakala	Pan-STARRS 1	·	1.1 km	MPC · JPL
713741	2015 FY_{139}	—	December 13, 2006	Kitt Peak	Spacewatch	·	940 m	MPC · JPL
713742	2015 FS_{143}	—	August 19, 2006	Kitt Peak	Spacewatch	·	1.6 km	MPC · JPL
713743	2015 FX_{143}	—	April 25, 2007	Kitt Peak	Spacewatch	KON	1.4 km	MPC · JPL
713744	2015 FU_{147}	—	May 6, 2011	Kitt Peak	Spacewatch	·	1.2 km	MPC · JPL
713745	2015 FA_{148}	—	March 14, 2007	Mount Lemmon	Mount Lemmon Survey	·	990 m	MPC · JPL
713746	2015 FX_{153}	—	September 12, 2009	Kitt Peak	Spacewatch	L4	8.9 km	MPC · JPL
713747	2015 FJ_{154}	—	November 24, 2006	Mount Lemmon	Mount Lemmon Survey	·	1.3 km	MPC · JPL
713748	2015 FP_{154}	—	September 21, 2009	Mount Lemmon	Mount Lemmon Survey	·	860 m	MPC · JPL
713749	2015 FY_{154}	—	March 21, 2015	Haleakala	Pan-STARRS 1	·	850 m	MPC · JPL
713750	2015 FT_{155}	—	July 30, 2008	Kitt Peak	Spacewatch	·	1.1 km	MPC · JPL
713751	2015 FS_{157}	—	March 26, 2004	Kitt Peak	Spacewatch	·	1.0 km	MPC · JPL
713752	2015 FU_{164}	—	December 12, 2006	Mount Lemmon	Mount Lemmon Survey	MAS	690 m	MPC · JPL
713753	2015 FK_{165}	—	October 8, 2012	Mount Lemmon	Mount Lemmon Survey	·	1.1 km	MPC · JPL
713754	2015 FG_{166}	—	October 11, 2012	Mount Lemmon	Mount Lemmon Survey	·	2.2 km	MPC · JPL
713755	2015 FZ_{168}	—	March 21, 2015	Haleakala	Pan-STARRS 1	·	850 m	MPC · JPL
713756	2015 FH_{169}	—	October 22, 2012	Kitt Peak	Spacewatch	(5)	900 m	MPC · JPL
713757	2015 FJ_{172}	—	February 7, 2011	Mount Lemmon	Mount Lemmon Survey	·	960 m	MPC · JPL
713758	2015 FJ_{173}	—	October 17, 2012	Haleakala	Pan-STARRS 1	·	1.2 km	MPC · JPL
713759	2015 FW_{173}	—	April 6, 2011	Mount Lemmon	Mount Lemmon Survey	·	1.1 km	MPC · JPL
713760	2015 FK_{178}	—	November 18, 2009	Mount Lemmon	Mount Lemmon Survey	CLA	1.4 km	MPC · JPL
713761	2015 FU_{179}	—	January 23, 2006	Kitt Peak	Spacewatch	·	1.2 km	MPC · JPL
713762	2015 FO_{180}	—	March 22, 2015	Mount Lemmon	Mount Lemmon Survey	·	1.4 km	MPC · JPL
713763	2015 FY_{180}	—	September 24, 2008	Mount Lemmon	Mount Lemmon Survey	·	1.2 km	MPC · JPL
713764	2015 FZ_{182}	—	October 18, 2012	Haleakala	Pan-STARRS 1	·	1.7 km	MPC · JPL
713765	2015 FF_{184}	—	January 25, 2011	Mount Lemmon	Mount Lemmon Survey	·	920 m	MPC · JPL
713766	2015 FH_{185}	—	February 18, 2015	Haleakala	Pan-STARRS 1	·	970 m	MPC · JPL
713767	2015 FH_{186}	—	November 11, 2013	Mount Lemmon	Mount Lemmon Survey	·	1.1 km	MPC · JPL
713768	2015 FM_{188}	—	December 28, 2005	Kitt Peak	Spacewatch	·	1.3 km	MPC · JPL
713769	2015 FG_{189}	—	March 22, 2015	Haleakala	Pan-STARRS 1	·	1.2 km	MPC · JPL
713770	2015 FJ_{191}	—	January 16, 2015	Haleakala	Pan-STARRS 1	·	950 m	MPC · JPL
713771	2015 FP_{192}	—	December 25, 2013	Mount Lemmon	Mount Lemmon Survey	MAR	1.5 km	MPC · JPL
713772	2015 FJ_{196}	—	October 9, 2012	Mount Lemmon	Mount Lemmon Survey	T_{j} (2.98) · 3:2	3.8 km	MPC · JPL
713773	2015 FC_{203}	—	September 14, 2005	Kitt Peak	Spacewatch	·	830 m	MPC · JPL
713774	2015 FK_{204}	—	March 22, 2015	Haleakala	Pan-STARRS 1	V	580 m	MPC · JPL
713775	2015 FO_{205}	—	September 15, 2011	Haleakala	Pan-STARRS 1	·	2.7 km	MPC · JPL
713776	2015 FQ_{205}	—	August 26, 2012	Haleakala	Pan-STARRS 1	·	1.2 km	MPC · JPL
713777	2015 FG_{208}	—	September 18, 1998	Kitt Peak	Spacewatch	·	1.8 km	MPC · JPL
713778	2015 FT_{208}	—	February 16, 2015	Haleakala	Pan-STARRS 1	MAS	510 m	MPC · JPL
713779	2015 FF_{209}	—	October 3, 2013	Mount Lemmon	Mount Lemmon Survey	V	640 m	MPC · JPL
713780	2015 FZ_{214}	—	September 11, 2005	Kitt Peak	Spacewatch	PHO	940 m	MPC · JPL
713781	2015 FU_{217}	—	October 2, 2013	Haleakala	Pan-STARRS 1	·	890 m	MPC · JPL
713782	2015 FX_{217}	—	April 16, 2007	Mount Lemmon	Mount Lemmon Survey	·	920 m	MPC · JPL
713783	2015 FT_{218}	—	February 8, 2011	Mount Lemmon	Mount Lemmon Survey	·	980 m	MPC · JPL
713784	2015 FA_{219}	—	March 23, 2015	Haleakala	Pan-STARRS 1	AGN	790 m	MPC · JPL
713785	2015 FK_{222}	—	February 18, 2015	Kitt Peak	Research and Education Collaborative Occultation Network	·	820 m	MPC · JPL
713786	2015 FV_{222}	—	February 19, 2015	Haleakala	Pan-STARRS 1	·	930 m	MPC · JPL
713787	2015 FM_{224}	—	April 8, 2008	Mount Lemmon	Mount Lemmon Survey	·	1 km	MPC · JPL
713788	2015 FW_{227}	—	February 7, 2008	Mount Lemmon	Mount Lemmon Survey	·	3.0 km	MPC · JPL
713789	2015 FQ_{230}	—	March 29, 2008	Kitt Peak	Spacewatch	·	830 m	MPC · JPL
713790	2015 FH_{232}	—	March 22, 2015	Mount Lemmon	Mount Lemmon Survey	MAS	660 m	MPC · JPL
713791	2015 FE_{234}	—	January 23, 2015	Haleakala	Pan-STARRS 1	·	1.8 km	MPC · JPL
713792	2015 FS_{235}	—	August 21, 2008	Kitt Peak	Spacewatch	KON	1.9 km	MPC · JPL
713793	2015 FB_{239}	—	April 7, 2008	Kitt Peak	Spacewatch	V	550 m	MPC · JPL
713794	2015 FJ_{239}	—	March 23, 2015	Haleakala	Pan-STARRS 1	·	2.0 km	MPC · JPL
713795	2015 FF_{244}	—	March 23, 2015	Haleakala	Pan-STARRS 1	·	880 m	MPC · JPL
713796	2015 FE_{245}	—	April 6, 2011	Mount Lemmon	Mount Lemmon Survey	·	1.2 km	MPC · JPL
713797	2015 FB_{249}	—	March 11, 2007	Kitt Peak	Spacewatch	·	1.1 km	MPC · JPL
713798	2015 FD_{250}	—	March 16, 2004	Kitt Peak	Spacewatch	·	990 m	MPC · JPL
713799	2015 FR_{251}	—	February 16, 2015	Haleakala	Pan-STARRS 1	V	560 m	MPC · JPL
713800	2015 FC_{252}	—	January 21, 2015	Haleakala	Pan-STARRS 1	·	1.1 km	MPC · JPL

== 713801–713900 ==
back to top

Designation			Discovery			Properties		Ref
Permanent	Provisional	Named after	Date	Site	Discoverer(s)	Category	Diam.	Ref
713801	2015 FN_{252}	—	March 23, 2015	Haleakala	Pan-STARRS 1	(5)	780 m	MPC · JPL
713802	2015 FL_{256}	—	April 25, 2007	Kitt Peak	Spacewatch	·	1.1 km	MPC · JPL
713803	2015 FH_{261}	—	March 13, 2015	Cerro Paranal	Altmann, M., Prusti, T.	·	750 m	MPC · JPL
713804	2015 FS_{261}	—	February 11, 2015	Mount Lemmon	Mount Lemmon Survey	PHO	630 m	MPC · JPL
713805	2015 FS_{263}	—	September 29, 2010	Mount Lemmon	Mount Lemmon Survey	·	750 m	MPC · JPL
713806	2015 FB_{269}	—	November 29, 2013	Mount Lemmon	Mount Lemmon Survey	MAR	860 m	MPC · JPL
713807	2015 FN_{269}	—	November 17, 1995	Kitt Peak	Spacewatch	NYS	900 m	MPC · JPL
713808	2015 FD_{271}	—	December 11, 2010	Mount Lemmon	Mount Lemmon Survey	·	670 m	MPC · JPL
713809	2015 FO_{276}	—	April 6, 2008	Kitt Peak	Spacewatch	·	1.2 km	MPC · JPL
713810	2015 FQ_{282}	—	November 29, 2013	Mount Lemmon	Mount Lemmon Survey	·	940 m	MPC · JPL
713811	2015 FY_{286}	—	January 24, 2014	Haleakala	Pan-STARRS 1	·	2.9 km	MPC · JPL
713812	2015 FZ_{286}	—	January 18, 2005	Kitt Peak	Spacewatch	MAR	930 m	MPC · JPL
713813	2015 FG_{289}	—	January 28, 2015	Haleakala	Pan-STARRS 1	·	1.2 km	MPC · JPL
713814	2015 FA_{293}	—	April 25, 2008	Mount Lemmon	Mount Lemmon Survey	·	720 m	MPC · JPL
713815	2015 FO_{293}	—	March 27, 2015	Mount Lemmon	Mount Lemmon Survey	·	3.2 km	MPC · JPL
713816	2015 FB_{296}	—	November 27, 2013	Haleakala	Pan-STARRS 1	·	1.1 km	MPC · JPL
713817	2015 FK_{297}	—	January 22, 2015	Haleakala	Pan-STARRS 1	·	1.6 km	MPC · JPL
713818	2015 FA_{300}	—	March 28, 2015	Haleakala	Pan-STARRS 1	MAR	1.0 km	MPC · JPL
713819	2015 FX_{300}	—	August 21, 2011	Haleakala	Pan-STARRS 1	·	1.5 km	MPC · JPL
713820	2015 FG_{303}	—	January 28, 2007	Kitt Peak	Spacewatch	PHO	880 m	MPC · JPL
713821	2015 FJ_{315}	—	March 25, 2015	Haleakala	Pan-STARRS 1	·	1.1 km	MPC · JPL
713822	2015 FP_{315}	—	May 5, 2011	Kitt Peak	Spacewatch	·	1.5 km	MPC · JPL
713823	2015 FM_{320}	—	January 23, 2015	Haleakala	Pan-STARRS 1	·	940 m	MPC · JPL
713824	2015 FM_{321}	—	March 25, 2015	Haleakala	Pan-STARRS 1	MAR	970 m	MPC · JPL
713825	2015 FY_{323}	—	December 27, 2005	Kitt Peak	Spacewatch	·	1.2 km	MPC · JPL
713826	2015 FD_{324}	—	March 25, 2015	Haleakala	Pan-STARRS 1	·	1.4 km	MPC · JPL
713827	2015 FJ_{325}	—	April 28, 2011	Kitt Peak	Spacewatch	EUN	720 m	MPC · JPL
713828	2015 FN_{328}	—	April 28, 2003	Kitt Peak	Spacewatch	RAF	660 m	MPC · JPL
713829	2015 FL_{330}	—	January 23, 2015	Haleakala	Pan-STARRS 1	·	1.4 km	MPC · JPL
713830	2015 FP_{330}	—	January 21, 2015	Haleakala	Pan-STARRS 1	EUN	730 m	MPC · JPL
713831	2015 FD_{333}	—	March 29, 2015	Haleakala	Pan-STARRS 1	MAR	990 m	MPC · JPL
713832	2015 FU_{334}	—	September 27, 2003	Kitt Peak	Spacewatch	ADE	1.6 km	MPC · JPL
713833	2015 FF_{335}	—	July 14, 2001	Palomar	NEAT	·	910 m	MPC · JPL
713834	2015 FY_{337}	—	March 30, 2015	Haleakala	Pan-STARRS 1	·	1.7 km	MPC · JPL
713835	2015 FM_{338}	—	June 22, 2011	Mount Lemmon	Mount Lemmon Survey	·	1.4 km	MPC · JPL
713836	2015 FT_{338}	—	January 28, 2014	Kitt Peak	Spacewatch	EOS	1.7 km	MPC · JPL
713837	2015 FR_{339}	—	September 23, 2006	Kitt Peak	Spacewatch	·	2.8 km	MPC · JPL
713838	2015 FH_{343}	—	May 3, 2006	Mount Lemmon	Mount Lemmon Survey	·	1.5 km	MPC · JPL
713839	2015 FJ_{343}	—	February 16, 2015	Haleakala	Pan-STARRS 1	JUN	1.0 km	MPC · JPL
713840	2015 FO_{348}	—	March 16, 2015	Haleakala	Pan-STARRS 1	HNS	790 m	MPC · JPL
713841	2015 FR_{356}	—	October 2, 2005	Mount Lemmon	Mount Lemmon Survey	·	1.1 km	MPC · JPL
713842	2015 FN_{357}	—	October 18, 2012	Haleakala	Pan-STARRS 1	·	2.1 km	MPC · JPL
713843	2015 FO_{357}	—	March 15, 2015	Kitt Peak	Spacewatch	EUN	1.0 km	MPC · JPL
713844	2015 FS_{359}	—	May 23, 2011	Mount Lemmon	Mount Lemmon Survey	·	890 m	MPC · JPL
713845	2015 FQ_{360}	—	November 1, 2008	Mount Lemmon	Mount Lemmon Survey	·	1.6 km	MPC · JPL
713846	2015 FW_{360}	—	March 17, 2015	Haleakala	Pan-STARRS 1	·	500 m	MPC · JPL
713847	2015 FE_{361}	—	September 26, 2011	Haleakala	Pan-STARRS 1	·	2.3 km	MPC · JPL
713848	2015 FA_{367}	—	February 20, 2015	Haleakala	Pan-STARRS 1	·	1.3 km	MPC · JPL
713849	2015 FX_{371}	—	January 28, 2015	Haleakala	Pan-STARRS 1	ADE	1.5 km	MPC · JPL
713850	2015 FV_{372}	—	March 18, 2015	Haleakala	Pan-STARRS 1	·	1.0 km	MPC · JPL
713851	2015 FA_{376}	—	August 26, 2012	Kitt Peak	Spacewatch	·	1.2 km	MPC · JPL
713852	2015 FT_{376}	—	January 26, 2015	Haleakala	Pan-STARRS 1	·	3.4 km	MPC · JPL
713853	2015 FH_{377}	—	August 11, 2008	Črni Vrh	Matičič, S.	·	890 m	MPC · JPL
713854	2015 FZ_{378}	—	February 20, 2015	Haleakala	Pan-STARRS 1	·	1.4 km	MPC · JPL
713855	2015 FD_{379}	—	March 14, 2015	Haleakala	Pan-STARRS 1	·	1.0 km	MPC · JPL
713856	2015 FE_{379}	—	November 9, 2007	Kitt Peak	Spacewatch	·	2.5 km	MPC · JPL
713857	2015 FU_{379}	—	September 30, 2009	Mount Lemmon	Mount Lemmon Survey	·	1.0 km	MPC · JPL
713858	2015 FW_{384}	—	October 4, 2013	Kitt Peak	Spacewatch	·	990 m	MPC · JPL
713859	2015 FL_{386}	—	January 16, 2013	Mount Lemmon	Mount Lemmon Survey	L4	7.7 km	MPC · JPL
713860	2015 FK_{389}	—	March 20, 2015	Haleakala	Pan-STARRS 1	·	1.2 km	MPC · JPL
713861	2015 FN_{389}	—	September 5, 2008	Kitt Peak	Spacewatch	·	1.5 km	MPC · JPL
713862	2015 FQ_{389}	—	March 20, 2015	Haleakala	Pan-STARRS 1	L4	7.2 km	MPC · JPL
713863	2015 FC_{390}	—	August 27, 2000	Cerro Tololo	Deep Ecliptic Survey	·	3.1 km	MPC · JPL
713864	2015 FU_{390}	—	March 9, 2007	Kitt Peak	Spacewatch	PHO	1.0 km	MPC · JPL
713865	2015 FK_{395}	—	March 21, 2015	Haleakala	Pan-STARRS 1	MIS	2.0 km	MPC · JPL
713866	2015 FL_{403}	—	October 5, 2012	Mount Lemmon	Mount Lemmon Survey	ADE	1.3 km	MPC · JPL
713867	2015 FD_{404}	—	April 2, 2011	Haleakala	Pan-STARRS 1	·	1.1 km	MPC · JPL
713868	2015 FZ_{404}	—	April 9, 2015	Mount Lemmon	Mount Lemmon Survey	·	1.1 km	MPC · JPL
713869	2015 FA_{405}	—	March 24, 2015	Mount Lemmon	Mount Lemmon Survey	·	1.9 km	MPC · JPL
713870	2015 FF_{405}	—	March 16, 2015	Kitt Peak	Spacewatch	·	790 m	MPC · JPL
713871	2015 FY_{405}	—	May 28, 2011	Mayhill-ISON	L. Elenin	·	1.2 km	MPC · JPL
713872	2015 FZ_{405}	—	November 28, 2013	Mount Lemmon	Mount Lemmon Survey	MAR	690 m	MPC · JPL
713873	2015 FH_{407}	—	March 21, 2015	Haleakala	Pan-STARRS 1	·	2.0 km	MPC · JPL
713874	2015 FC_{411}	—	September 5, 2000	Apache Point	SDSS Collaboration	MAR	830 m	MPC · JPL
713875	2015 FS_{413}	—	March 30, 2015	Haleakala	Pan-STARRS 1	V	610 m	MPC · JPL
713876	2015 FT_{413}	—	September 24, 2008	Kitt Peak	Spacewatch	MAR	670 m	MPC · JPL
713877	2015 FV_{414}	—	July 5, 2000	Kitt Peak	Spacewatch	(5)	980 m	MPC · JPL
713878	2015 FW_{420}	—	March 22, 2015	Haleakala	Pan-STARRS 1	·	1.0 km	MPC · JPL
713879	2015 FX_{420}	—	March 25, 2015	Mount Lemmon	Mount Lemmon Survey	·	1.2 km	MPC · JPL
713880	2015 FG_{421}	—	March 29, 2015	Haleakala	Pan-STARRS 1	·	1.4 km	MPC · JPL
713881	2015 FZ_{425}	—	March 19, 2015	Haleakala	Pan-STARRS 1	L4	5.9 km	MPC · JPL
713882	2015 FS_{427}	—	March 22, 2015	Haleakala	Pan-STARRS 1	AGN	860 m	MPC · JPL
713883	2015 FD_{428}	—	March 17, 2015	Mount Lemmon	Mount Lemmon Survey	L4	6.7 km	MPC · JPL
713884	2015 FP_{430}	—	March 27, 2015	Haleakala	Pan-STARRS 1	·	1.1 km	MPC · JPL
713885	2015 FT_{430}	—	March 19, 2015	Haleakala	Pan-STARRS 1	·	1.3 km	MPC · JPL
713886	2015 FE_{433}	—	March 28, 2015	Haleakala	Pan-STARRS 1	·	1.0 km	MPC · JPL
713887	2015 FK_{437}	—	March 22, 2015	Haleakala	Pan-STARRS 1	·	860 m	MPC · JPL
713888	2015 FT_{437}	—	March 16, 2015	Mount Lemmon	Mount Lemmon Survey	·	1.3 km	MPC · JPL
713889	2015 FT_{443}	—	March 17, 2015	Haleakala	Pan-STARRS 1	·	2.4 km	MPC · JPL
713890	2015 FD_{447}	—	March 28, 2015	Haleakala	Pan-STARRS 1	EOS	1.2 km	MPC · JPL
713891	2015 FB_{448}	—	March 20, 2015	Haleakala	Pan-STARRS 1	·	2.8 km	MPC · JPL
713892	2015 FH_{448}	—	March 21, 2015	Haleakala	Pan-STARRS 1	·	1.4 km	MPC · JPL
713893	2015 FO_{451}	—	March 22, 2015	Haleakala	Pan-STARRS 1	·	990 m	MPC · JPL
713894	2015 FB_{452}	—	March 22, 2015	Haleakala	Pan-STARRS 1	·	1.1 km	MPC · JPL
713895	2015 FT_{466}	—	March 22, 2015	Haleakala	Pan-STARRS 1	·	1.9 km	MPC · JPL
713896	2015 GN_{1}	—	October 18, 2006	Kitt Peak	Spacewatch	V	520 m	MPC · JPL
713897	2015 GF_{3}	—	March 29, 2015	Haleakala	Pan-STARRS 1	NYS	1.0 km	MPC · JPL
713898	2015 GZ_{11}	—	March 25, 2007	Mount Lemmon	Mount Lemmon Survey	EUN	840 m	MPC · JPL
713899	2015 GZ_{14}	—	May 23, 2003	Kitt Peak	Spacewatch	·	810 m	MPC · JPL
713900	2015 GT_{17}	—	March 24, 2015	Mount Lemmon	Mount Lemmon Survey	V	700 m	MPC · JPL

== 713901–714000 ==
back to top

Designation			Discovery			Properties		Ref
Permanent	Provisional	Named after	Date	Site	Discoverer(s)	Category	Diam.	Ref
713901	2015 GD_{20}	—	March 22, 2015	Haleakala	Pan-STARRS 1	·	2.1 km	MPC · JPL
713902	2015 GW_{20}	—	July 30, 2008	Kitt Peak	Spacewatch	·	1.1 km	MPC · JPL
713903	2015 GG_{21}	—	September 19, 1998	Apache Point	SDSS	MAS	680 m	MPC · JPL
713904	2015 GQ_{23}	—	March 28, 2015	Haleakala	Pan-STARRS 1	ADE	1.8 km	MPC · JPL
713905	2015 GR_{23}	—	May 5, 2002	Palomar	NEAT	EUN	1.1 km	MPC · JPL
713906	2015 GF_{24}	—	January 25, 2015	Haleakala	Pan-STARRS 1	·	1.0 km	MPC · JPL
713907	2015 GA_{25}	—	May 27, 2011	ESA OGS	ESA OGS	·	1.5 km	MPC · JPL
713908	2015 GX_{26}	—	December 25, 2005	Mount Lemmon	Mount Lemmon Survey	EUN	980 m	MPC · JPL
713909	2015 GJ_{27}	—	November 18, 2009	Kitt Peak	Spacewatch	·	1.2 km	MPC · JPL
713910	2015 GN_{29}	—	February 10, 2011	Mount Lemmon	Mount Lemmon Survey	MAS	640 m	MPC · JPL
713911	2015 GQ_{29}	—	March 1, 2011	Mount Lemmon	Mount Lemmon Survey	·	1.0 km	MPC · JPL
713912	2015 GO_{30}	—	September 14, 2009	Kitt Peak	Spacewatch	·	950 m	MPC · JPL
713913	2015 GN_{33}	—	April 10, 2015	Kitt Peak	Spacewatch	·	1.9 km	MPC · JPL
713914	2015 GY_{36}	—	November 6, 2008	Kitt Peak	Spacewatch	·	1.1 km	MPC · JPL
713915	2015 GW_{38}	—	April 23, 2007	Mount Lemmon	Mount Lemmon Survey	·	1.3 km	MPC · JPL
713916	2015 GF_{43}	—	January 27, 2011	Kitt Peak	Spacewatch	·	620 m	MPC · JPL
713917	2015 GA_{45}	—	February 23, 2015	Haleakala	Pan-STARRS 1	·	1.2 km	MPC · JPL
713918	2015 GL_{45}	—	September 6, 2013	Mount Lemmon	Mount Lemmon Survey	·	1.1 km	MPC · JPL
713919	2015 GQ_{45}	—	February 28, 2014	Haleakala	Pan-STARRS 1	·	2.7 km	MPC · JPL
713920	2015 GC_{49}	—	March 21, 2015	Haleakala	Pan-STARRS 1	PHO	780 m	MPC · JPL
713921	2015 GQ_{49}	—	April 6, 2011	Mount Lemmon	Mount Lemmon Survey	·	1.1 km	MPC · JPL
713922	2015 GP_{52}	—	August 26, 2012	Haleakala	Pan-STARRS 1	·	1.1 km	MPC · JPL
713923	2015 GZ_{68}	—	April 13, 2015	Haleakala	Pan-STARRS 1	MAR	880 m	MPC · JPL
713924	2015 GH_{78}	—	April 10, 2015	Mount Lemmon	Mount Lemmon Survey	·	1.5 km	MPC · JPL
713925	2015 HT_{1}	—	September 15, 2003	Anderson Mesa	LONEOS	·	1.4 km	MPC · JPL
713926	2015 HP_{13}	—	March 7, 2008	Kitt Peak	Spacewatch	·	720 m	MPC · JPL
713927	2015 HB_{14}	—	February 23, 2015	Haleakala	Pan-STARRS 1	·	1.0 km	MPC · JPL
713928	2015 HE_{14}	—	October 25, 2012	Kitt Peak	Spacewatch	·	1.2 km	MPC · JPL
713929	2015 HS_{16}	—	April 9, 2010	Kitt Peak	Spacewatch	EOS	1.7 km	MPC · JPL
713930	2015 HB_{17}	—	April 3, 2000	Kitt Peak	Spacewatch	·	990 m	MPC · JPL
713931	2015 HB_{19}	—	April 14, 2015	Mount Lemmon	Mount Lemmon Survey	·	1.5 km	MPC · JPL
713932	2015 HC_{22}	—	May 26, 2011	Mount Lemmon	Mount Lemmon Survey	·	820 m	MPC · JPL
713933	2015 HW_{26}	—	March 4, 2011	Mount Lemmon	Mount Lemmon Survey	·	1.1 km	MPC · JPL
713934	2015 HY_{26}	—	November 9, 2004	Mauna Kea	P. A. Wiegert, A. Papadimos	·	940 m	MPC · JPL
713935	2015 HT_{29}	—	January 23, 2015	Haleakala	Pan-STARRS 1	·	1.1 km	MPC · JPL
713936	2015 HB_{30}	—	March 18, 2015	Haleakala	Pan-STARRS 1	·	960 m	MPC · JPL
713937	2015 HH_{31}	—	April 15, 2015	Mount Lemmon	Mount Lemmon Survey	·	880 m	MPC · JPL
713938	2015 HM_{33}	—	May 13, 2011	Mount Lemmon	Mount Lemmon Survey	·	940 m	MPC · JPL
713939	2015 HR_{33}	—	February 12, 2011	Mount Lemmon	Mount Lemmon Survey	·	780 m	MPC · JPL
713940	2015 HP_{34}	—	August 17, 2012	ESA OGS	ESA OGS	·	1.1 km	MPC · JPL
713941	2015 HX_{37}	—	April 2, 2011	Kitt Peak	Spacewatch	·	1.3 km	MPC · JPL
713942	2015 HJ_{41}	—	May 1, 2011	Mount Lemmon	Mount Lemmon Survey	·	1.1 km	MPC · JPL
713943	2015 HK_{41}	—	June 15, 2007	Kitt Peak	Spacewatch	·	1.3 km	MPC · JPL
713944	2015 HM_{44}	—	April 16, 2015	Haleakala	Pan-STARRS 1	·	900 m	MPC · JPL
713945	2015 HP_{47}	—	March 22, 2015	Haleakala	Pan-STARRS 1	EUN	880 m	MPC · JPL
713946	2015 HA_{48}	—	November 10, 2013	Mount Lemmon	Mount Lemmon Survey	V	600 m	MPC · JPL
713947	2015 HZ_{48}	—	April 10, 2015	Mount Lemmon	Mount Lemmon Survey	·	2.1 km	MPC · JPL
713948	2015 HD_{49}	—	March 26, 2011	Mount Lemmon	Mount Lemmon Survey	·	1.1 km	MPC · JPL
713949	2015 HJ_{55}	—	March 21, 2015	Haleakala	Pan-STARRS 1	V	600 m	MPC · JPL
713950	2015 HE_{57}	—	April 18, 2015	Haleakala	Pan-STARRS 1	·	1.3 km	MPC · JPL
713951	2015 HJ_{57}	—	August 23, 2003	Palomar	NEAT	·	1.3 km	MPC · JPL
713952	2015 HZ_{57}	—	April 18, 2015	Haleakala	Pan-STARRS 1	EUN	1.0 km	MPC · JPL
713953	2015 HD_{59}	—	February 26, 2014	Haleakala	Pan-STARRS 1	3:2	5.1 km	MPC · JPL
713954	2015 HH_{59}	—	April 18, 2015	Haleakala	Pan-STARRS 1	·	1.2 km	MPC · JPL
713955	2015 HX_{59}	—	March 22, 2015	Haleakala	Pan-STARRS 1	·	1.2 km	MPC · JPL
713956	2015 HK_{61}	—	March 15, 2004	Kitt Peak	Spacewatch	NYS	900 m	MPC · JPL
713957	2015 HT_{61}	—	April 27, 2011	Mount Lemmon	Mount Lemmon Survey	·	1.2 km	MPC · JPL
713958	2015 HQ_{62}	—	October 16, 2012	Kitt Peak	Spacewatch	EUN	1.1 km	MPC · JPL
713959	2015 HY_{62}	—	November 1, 2013	Mount Lemmon	Mount Lemmon Survey	·	940 m	MPC · JPL
713960	2015 HM_{64}	—	November 26, 2013	Mayhill-ISON	L. Elenin	·	570 m	MPC · JPL
713961	2015 HW_{67}	—	December 7, 2013	Kitt Peak	Spacewatch	·	1.1 km	MPC · JPL
713962	2015 HU_{68}	—	March 17, 2015	Haleakala	Pan-STARRS 1	MAR	830 m	MPC · JPL
713963	2015 HY_{70}	—	November 15, 2012	Mount Lemmon	Mount Lemmon Survey	·	2.1 km	MPC · JPL
713964	2015 HZ_{70}	—	May 22, 2011	Mount Lemmon	Mount Lemmon Survey	·	1.0 km	MPC · JPL
713965	2015 HW_{72}	—	October 8, 2008	Mount Lemmon	Mount Lemmon Survey	·	780 m	MPC · JPL
713966	2015 HZ_{75}	—	September 29, 2005	Mount Lemmon	Mount Lemmon Survey	NYS	1.0 km	MPC · JPL
713967	2015 HG_{76}	—	March 26, 2006	Mount Lemmon	Mount Lemmon Survey	·	1.0 km	MPC · JPL
713968	2015 HG_{78}	—	September 27, 2006	Mount Lemmon	Mount Lemmon Survey	·	820 m	MPC · JPL
713969	2015 HT_{80}	—	April 23, 2015	Haleakala	Pan-STARRS 1	V	470 m	MPC · JPL
713970	2015 HM_{84}	—	March 13, 2007	Kitt Peak	Spacewatch	·	1.1 km	MPC · JPL
713971	2015 HL_{85}	—	October 12, 2005	Kitt Peak	Spacewatch	·	1.0 km	MPC · JPL
713972	2015 HH_{91}	—	April 23, 2015	Haleakala	Pan-STARRS 1	3:2	4.0 km	MPC · JPL
713973	2015 HO_{93}	—	March 18, 2004	Kitt Peak	Spacewatch	·	1.0 km	MPC · JPL
713974	2015 HA_{94}	—	February 19, 2009	Kitt Peak	Spacewatch	·	2.5 km	MPC · JPL
713975	2015 HO_{94}	—	March 22, 2015	Mount Lemmon	Mount Lemmon Survey	·	1.5 km	MPC · JPL
713976	2015 HE_{95}	—	September 27, 2008	Mount Lemmon	Mount Lemmon Survey	·	1.3 km	MPC · JPL
713977	2015 HW_{95}	—	January 24, 2007	Mount Lemmon	Mount Lemmon Survey	NYS	1.1 km	MPC · JPL
713978	2015 HA_{96}	—	January 2, 2014	Mount Lemmon	Mount Lemmon Survey	·	950 m	MPC · JPL
713979	2015 HP_{96}	—	September 5, 2010	Mount Lemmon	Mount Lemmon Survey	L4	6.8 km	MPC · JPL
713980	2015 HH_{99}	—	October 27, 2008	Mount Lemmon	Mount Lemmon Survey	·	1.4 km	MPC · JPL
713981	2015 HU_{99}	—	January 20, 2014	Mount Lemmon	Mount Lemmon Survey	·	690 m	MPC · JPL
713982	2015 HR_{100}	—	October 22, 2012	Mount Lemmon	Mount Lemmon Survey	ADE	1.6 km	MPC · JPL
713983	2015 HO_{102}	—	September 19, 2012	Mount Lemmon	Mount Lemmon Survey	·	1.1 km	MPC · JPL
713984	2015 HS_{104}	—	June 2, 2011	Haleakala	Pan-STARRS 1	·	1.0 km	MPC · JPL
713985	2015 HS_{106}	—	May 26, 2011	Kitt Peak	Spacewatch	·	1.5 km	MPC · JPL
713986	2015 HM_{108}	—	April 25, 2007	Mount Lemmon	Mount Lemmon Survey	·	890 m	MPC · JPL
713987	2015 HN_{109}	—	December 28, 2013	Mount Lemmon	Mount Lemmon Survey	MAR	680 m	MPC · JPL
713988	2015 HU_{109}	—	December 24, 2013	Mount Lemmon	Mount Lemmon Survey	·	1.2 km	MPC · JPL
713989	2015 HW_{110}	—	December 18, 2009	Mount Lemmon	Mount Lemmon Survey	EUN	1.0 km	MPC · JPL
713990	2015 HD_{111}	—	November 16, 2009	Kitt Peak	Spacewatch	EUN	1.2 km	MPC · JPL
713991	2015 HX_{112}	—	January 29, 2009	Mount Lemmon	Mount Lemmon Survey	·	1.9 km	MPC · JPL
713992	2015 HG_{115}	—	May 1, 2003	Kitt Peak	Spacewatch	·	930 m	MPC · JPL
713993	2015 HR_{115}	—	December 25, 2005	Kitt Peak	Spacewatch	BRG	1.2 km	MPC · JPL
713994	2015 HF_{116}	—	April 13, 2015	Haleakala	Pan-STARRS 1	·	1.3 km	MPC · JPL
713995	2015 HW_{117}	—	October 9, 2012	Mount Lemmon	Mount Lemmon Survey	·	1.2 km	MPC · JPL
713996	2015 HH_{119}	—	April 23, 2015	Haleakala	Pan-STARRS 1	·	1.1 km	MPC · JPL
713997	2015 HG_{122}	—	October 31, 2013	Mount Lemmon	Mount Lemmon Survey	·	1.1 km	MPC · JPL
713998	2015 HC_{128}	—	April 19, 2015	Cerro Paranal	Altmann, M., Prusti, T.	AGN	1.0 km	MPC · JPL
713999	2015 HQ_{128}	—	February 26, 2014	Haleakala	Pan-STARRS 1	L4	6.9 km	MPC · JPL
714000	2015 HU_{130}	—	January 10, 2007	Kitt Peak	Spacewatch	·	1.1 km	MPC · JPL

back to top

== Meaning of names ==
As minor planet discoveries are confirmed, they are given a permanent number by the IAU's Minor Planet Center (MPC), and the discoverers can then submit names for them, following the IAU's naming conventions. The list below concerns those minor planets in the specified number-range that have received names, and explains the meanings of those names.

Official naming citations of newly named small Solar System bodies are approved and published in a bulletin by IAU's Working Group for Small Bodies Nomenclature (WGSBN). Before May 2021, citations were published in MPC's Minor Planet Circulars for many decades. Recent citations can also be found on the JPL Small-Body Database (SBDB). Until his death in 2016, German astronomer Lutz D. Schmadel compiled these citations into the Dictionary of Minor Planet Names (DMP) and regularly updated the collection.

Based on Paul Herget's The Names of the Minor Planets, Schmadel also researched the unclear origin of numerous asteroids, most of which had been named prior to World War II. This article incorporates text from this source, which is in the public domain: SBDB New namings may only be added to this list below after official publication as the preannouncement of names is condemned. The WGSBN publishes a comprehensive guideline for the naming rules of non-cometary small Solar System bodies.

Named minor planet	Provisional	This minor planet was named for...	Ref · Catalog
713133 Taiping	2015 AB_{54}	Taipei Municipal Taiping Elementary School was established in 1898 and was one of the earliest primary education institutions in Taiwan. It has borne witness to the development of modern education in the country.	IAU · 713133
713428 Mirosławdziergas	2015 BX_{490}	Mirosław Dziergas, Director of the Department of Tourism, Culture, Sports and Promotion of Żywiec County.	IAU · 713428
