= Meanings of minor-planet names: 35001–36000 =

As minor planet discoveries are confirmed, they are given a permanent number by the IAU's Minor Planet Center (MPC), and the discoverers can then submit names for them, following the IAU's naming conventions. The list below concerns those minor planets in the specified number-range that have received names, and explains the meanings of those names.

Official naming citations of newly named small Solar System bodies are approved and published in a bulletin by IAU's Working Group for Small Bodies Nomenclature (WGSBN). Before May 2021, citations were published in MPC's Minor Planet Circulars for many decades. Recent citations can also be found on the JPL Small-Body Database (SBDB). Until his death in 2016, German astronomer Lutz D. Schmadel compiled these citations into the Dictionary of Minor Planet Names (DMP) and regularly updated the collection.

Based on Paul Herget's The Names of the Minor Planets, Schmadel also researched the unclear origin of numerous asteroids, most of which had been named prior to World War II. This article incorporates text from this source, which is in the public domain: SBDB New namings may only be added to this list below after official publication as the preannouncement of names is condemned. The WGSBN publishes a comprehensive guideline for the naming rules of non-cometary small Solar System bodies.

== 35001–35100 ==
Named minor planet	Provisional	This minor planet was named for...	Ref · Catalog
35053 Rojyurij	1982 UA_{11}	Yurij Arsentyevich Roj (born 1948) is an expert on laser ranging, space and ground-based communication systems, and a key participant in the Russian lunar program. He is a member of the K. E. Tsiolkovsky Russian Academy of Cosmonautics.	JPL · 35053
35056 Cullers	1984 ST	Kent Cullers, American physicist	JPL · 35056
35062 Sakuranosyou	1988 EP	Sakuranosyou, the Musashino Sakurano Elementary School, in Musashino, Tokyo, Japan, on the occasion of the tenth anniversary of the school's founding	JPL · 35062
35076 Yataro	1990 BA_{1}	Yataro Iwasaki, close friend of Sakamoto Ryōma and played a crucial role in bringing about the Meiji Restoration	JPL · 35076
35087 von Sydow	1990 UE_{5}	Max von Sydow (1929–2020), a Swedish screen actor.	JPL · 35087
35093 Akicity	1991 EH_{1}	Aki City, in eastern Kochi prefecture, Japan	JPL · 35093

== 35101–35200 ==
back to top

Named minor planet	Provisional	This minor planet was named for...	Ref · Catalog
35137 Meudon	1992 RT_{4}	Meudon, a small town near Paris JPL	MPC · 35137
35141 Tomitayoshikuni	1992 SH_{1}	Yoshikuni Tomita, Japanese amateur astronomer.	IAU · 35141
35143 Harimoto	1992 UF_{1}	Kazuko Harimoto, professor of public-health nursing at Nayoro City University in Hokkaido, Japan.	IAU · 35143
35165 Québec	1993 QF_{1}	Quebec City, Québec, Canada	JPL · 35165
35169 Araake	1993 SP_{2}	Norihisa Araake, Japanese amateur astronomer.	IAU · 35169
35170 Mizunochisato	1993 TM	Chisato Mizuno, Japanese amateur astronomer.	IAU · 35170
35171 Maedakoji	1993 TF_{1}	Koji Maeda, director of enrollment management at Tokyo Future University, a school corporation.	IAU · 35171
35172 Miyaharamisao	1993 TA_{3}	Misao Miyahara, Japanese astronomer.	IAU · 35172
35197 Longmire	1994 LH	Matthew J. Longmire, American(?) electrical engineer and pioneer of the astronomical CCD revolution †	MPC · 35197

== 35201–35300 ==
back to top

Named minor planet	Provisional	This minor planet was named for...	Ref · Catalog
35222 Delbarrio	1994 XD_{6}	Bianca Del Barrio, wife of Francesco Gallotti, a member of the Osservatorio di Montelupo (Montelupo Observatory)	JPL · 35222
35229 Benckert	1995 FY_{20}	Johann Peter Benckert, 18th-century German sculptor	JPL · 35229
35231 Sugimotojunya	1995 GH_{7}	Junya Sugimoto, deputy director of enrollment management at Tokyo Future University.	IAU · 35231
35233 Krčín	1995 KJ	Jakub Krčín of Jelčany, 16th-century Czech hydraulic engineer, designer of ponds such as Rožmberk Pond, Bohemia	JPL · 35233
35237 Matzner	1995 QP	Antonín Matzner, Czech musicologist †	MPC · 35237
35239 Ottoseydl	1995 SH_{2}	Otto Seydl (1884–1959), Czech populariser of astronomy, worked on stellar statistics and later on history of astronomy in Bohemia. He served as the director of the State Observatory in Klementinum in Prague (1939–1942 and 1945–1948). He was a member of the IAU and The Czech Astronomical Society.	JPL · 35239
35254 Noriko	1996 BW_{2}	Noriko Uto (1950–2015), wife of the discoverer of this minor planet.	IAU · 35254
35265 Takeosaitou	1996 NS_{5}	Takeo Saitou (born 1934), a member of the Yamagata Astronomical Society.	JPL · 35265
35268 Panoramix	1996 QY	Panoramix, also known as Getafix, is the village druid in the cartoon series Les aventures d´Asterix by Uderzo and Goscinny	JPL · 35268
35269 Idéfix	1996 QC_{1}	Idefix, also known as Dogmatix, is small white dog belonging to Obelix in the cartoon series Les aventures d´Asterix by Uderzo and Goscinny	JPL · 35269
35270 Molinari	1996 RL	Emilio Molinari (born 1963), developed his astronomical career in Brera Observatory, Milan, beginning with the study of distant clusters of galaxies then shifting to technology group. He now serves as director of the Telescopio Nazionale Galileo and Rapid Eye Mount observatories.	JPL · 35270
35274 Kenziarino	1996 RF_{24}	Kenzi Arino (born 1947), a member of the Yamagata Astronomical Society.	JPL · 35274
35283 Bradtimerson	1996 TB_{1}	Bradley W. Timerson (1950–2018) was a science teacher, weather spotter, amateur seismologist and active member of IOTA. Brad served as IOTA VP for Planetary Occultations, where he mentored observers and analyzed hundreds of submitted asteroidal occultations.	JPL · 35283
35286 Takaoakihiro	1996 TP_{9}	Akihiro Takao, Japanese amateur astronomer, member of the Matsue Astronomy Club	JPL · 35286
35295 Omo	1996 VM	On the banks of the Omo River in Ethiopia, archaeologists have found fossil fragments of early Olduwan hominids. The site was designated a UNESCO World Heritage Site in 1980.	JPL · 35295
35298 Azumachiharu	1996 VH_{5}	Chiharu Azuma, Japanese amateur astronomer.	IAU · 35298
35299 Kishisayoko	1996 VK_{8}	Sayoko Kishi (b. 1959) was a Japanese elementary and junior high-school teacher from 1981 to 1996. She later worked for the Hokkaido Prefectural Board of Education and retired in 2019. Sayoko has been working for the Nayoro City Board of Education since 2022, and is an educator in charge of the operations of the Nayoro Observatory.	IAU · 35299

== 35301–35400 ==
back to top

Named minor planet	Provisional	This minor planet was named for...	Ref · Catalog
35313 Hangtianyuan	1997 AC_{6}	Zhongguo Hangtianyuan Zhongxin (Astronaut Center of China), in Beijing Space City	JPL · 35313
35316 Monella	1997 AW_{13}	Rinaldo Monella, Italian amateur astronomer †	MPC · 35316
35324 Orlandi	1997 ET_{7}	Stefano Orlandi, worker in the T.L.C. Observatory for deep-sky photography and astrometry of comets and minor planets.	JPL · 35324
35325 Claudiaguarnieri	1997 EU_{7}	Claudia Guarnieri, student of the science of architecture at the University of Parma.	JPL · 35325
35326 Lucastrabla	(1997 EV_{7)}	Luca Strabla, Italian engineer and amateur astronomer.	JPL · 35326
35334 Yarkovsky	1997 FO_{1}	Ivan Osipovich Yarkovsky, 19th-century Russian engineer who put forward the idea of what is now called the Yarkovsky effect	JPL · 35334
35343 Tomoda	1997 GV_{36}	Satoshi Tomoda, Japanese amateur astronomer.	IAU · 35343
35346 Ivanoferri	1997 JX	Ivano Ferri (born 1946) is an Italian amateur astronomer, who has been at the T.L.C. Observatory since its 1991 foundation.	JPL · 35346
35347 Tallinn	1997 JN_{12}	Known as Kolyvan, and later as Reval, the Finnic-speaking community became the northernmost member of the Hanseatic League in 1285	JPL · 35347
35350 Lespaul	1997 LP_{14}	Les Paul, famous guitarist	JPL · 35350
35352 Texas	1997 PD_{2}	Texas, the largest state in the continental U.S.	JPL · 35352
35353 Naďapravcová	1997 RW_{9}	Naďa Pravcová (born 1997) is a daughter of the discoverer.	IAU · 35353
35355 Honzík	1997 SB_{2}	Jan "Honzík" Pravec (born 2002), son of the discoverer.	IAU · 35355
35356 Vondrák	1997 SL_{3}	Jan Vondrák, Czech astronomer, president of IAU Division I, 2007 winner of the Nušl Prize of the Česká astronomická společnost (ČAS, Czech Astronomical Society)	JPL · 35356
35357 Haraldlesch	1997 SX_{9}	Harald Lesch, professor of astronomy and astrophysics at LMU Munich	JPL · 35357
35358 Lorifini	1997 SL_{17}	Lorella Fini, daughter-in-law of the first discoverer	JPL · 35358
35364 Donaldpray	1997 UT	Donald P. Pray, American amateur astronomer	JPL · 35364
35365 Cooney	1997 UU	Walter R. Cooney Jr., American amateur astronomer	JPL · 35365
35366 Kaifeng	1997 UP_{4}	Kaifeng, a city located on the southern bank of the Yellow River in northern Henan province, China	JPL · 35366
35367 Dobrédílo	1997 UW_{7}	Dobré dílo, the publishing house of Josef Florian in Stará Říše (Moravia).	IAU · 35367
35370 Daisakyu	1997 UF_{21}	Tottori-Dai-Sakyu ("Tottori Sand Dunes"), Japan's greatest sand dune, near Tottori City which merged with Saji Village, where the Saji Observatory is located, in 2004	JPL · 35370
35371 Yokonozaki	1997 UZ_{21}	Yoko Nozaki (born 1965) is a curator at Higashiyamato City Museum who has shared astronomy with the general public for many years. She is one of the most famous planetarium communicators in Japan.	JPL · 35371
35391 Uzan	1997 XN_{3}	Jean-Philippe Uzan (born 1969) is a French theoretical physicist, renowned for his research on gravitation and relativistic cosmology. He has received several awards, including the Georges Lemaître prize, and is deeply involved in scientific outreach both by publishing popular books and mixing art and science.	IAU · 35391
35394 Countbasie	1997 XD_{9}	Count Basie (1904–1984) was an American jazz pianist, organist, bandleader and composer. One of the greatest jazz musicians of the 20th century, he founded the Count Basie Orchestra in 1935 and left an impressive discography.	JPL · 35394

== 35401–35500 ==
back to top

Named minor planet	Provisional	This minor planet was named for...	Ref · Catalog
35403 Latimer	1997 YW_{4}	Truett Latimer (born 1928) an American IMAX film producer and former president of the Houston Museum of Natural Science, was instrumental in the bold expansion of the museum in 1986, including in 1989 the building of its satellite facility, the George Observatory (Src).	JPL · 35403
35419 Beckysmethurst	1998 AC_{6}	Becky Smethurst (born 1990) is a British astrophysicist currently working at the University of Oxford. Her research concerns galaxies and their supermassive black holes. She maintains a very high quality YouTube channel with over 100.000 subscribers.	JPL · 35419
35427 Chelseawang	1998 BJ_{2}	Chelsea Wang (b. 2000) was awarded second place in the 2018 Intel International Science and Engineering Fair for her materials science team project. She attended the Fossil Ridge High School, Fort Collins, Colorado, U.S.A.	IAU · 35427
35429 Bochartdesaron	1998 BW_{4}	Jean Baptiste Gaspard Bochart de Saron (1730–1794) was a French magistrate and president of the Paris parliament. An amateur astronomer and mathematician, he was the first to compute a circular orbit for Uranus, and he computed orbits for many of Messier's comets until his death during the French Revolution.	IAU · 35429
35435 Erikayang	1998 BL_{13}	Erika Yang (b. 2000) was awarded first place in the 2018 Intel International Science and Engineering Fair for her materials science project. She attended the Granada High School, Livermore, California, U.S.A.	IAU · 35435
35441 Kyoko	1998 BH_{33}	Kyoko Iwasaki (born 1978), a Japanese swimmer who received a gold medal in the women's 200-m breast stroke at the Barcelona Olympics in 1992. She is not only a superior athlete in Japan, but also the youngest gold medallist in the history of the world's swim meets.	JPL · 35441
35444 Giuliamarconcini	1998 BU_{43}	Giulia Marconcini (born 1991) has a master's degree in construction engineering-architecture with honors. Her first work was the reinforced concrete structure supporting the dome of the astronomical observatory K83 "Beppe Forti" in Montelupo Fiorentino.	IAU · 35444
35446 Stáňa	1998 CK_{1}	Stáňa (Stanislava) Setváková, Czech staff member of the Prague Planetarium and wife of meteorologist Martin Setvák.	MPC · 35446
35459 Klaurieger	1998 DG_{20}	Klaudia Ivanics-Rieger (1989–2023), a geography and religious teacher, writer, educator, amateur astronomer and founder of the Bakony Astronomical Association	IAU · 35459
35461 Mazzucato	1998 DM_{23}	Michele Mazzucato, (born 1962) is an amateur astronomer and discoverer of minor planets whose main fields of interest are the history of astronomy, geometrical geodesy and astrometry of minor planets. A member of several scientific associations, he has written many articles and books, principally on geodesy and astronomy topics.	JPL · 35461
35462 Maramkaire	1998 DW_{23}	Maram Kaire (born 1978) is a Senegalese astronomer and founder of the Senegalese Association for the Promotion of Astronomy. He has supervised stellar occultation missions in collaboration with NASA. He is a member of the African Initiative for Planetary and Space Science and the representative of the IAU in Senegal.	IAU · 35462
35464 Elisaconsigli	1998 DC_{33}	Elisa Consigli (born 1981) a marketing executive and niece of Italian amateur astronomer Maura Tombelli, who co-discovered this minor planet. Elisa has graduated in linguistic and multimedia communication.	IAU · 35464
35465 Emilianoricci	1998 DF_{33}	Emiliano Ricci (born 1964) is an Italian science journalist and writer, known for his popularization of astronomy and physics. An astronomy enthusiast from a young age, he is the founder of the Florentine Astronomical Society.	IAU · 35465

== 35501–35600 ==
back to top

Named minor planet	Provisional	This minor planet was named for...	Ref · Catalog
35534 Clementfeller	1998 FW_{73}	Clement Feller (born 1989) is a postdoctoral researcher at the Physics Institute of Bern University, whose investigations include the photometric properties of cometary nuclei, asteroids and meteorites.	IAU · 35534

== 35601–35700 ==
back to top

Named minor planet	Provisional	This minor planet was named for...	Ref · Catalog
35618 Tartu	1998 HC_{149}	Tartu, Estonia	MPC · 35618
35621 Lorius	1998 JD_{4}	Claude Lorius (b. 1932), a French glaciologist.	IAU · 35621
35623 Pedrodavid	1998 KF_{7}	Pedro David (b. 1959), a French scientist.	IAU · 35623
35646 Estela	1998 KO_{66}	Estela Fernández-Valenzuela (born 1983) is a postdoctoral researcher at the Florida Space Institute at the University of Central Florida (Orlando, FL). Her studies include trojan asteroids and photometry of and stellar occultations by trans-Neptunian objects.	IAU · 35646
35655 Étienneklein	1998 OJ_{6}	Étienne Klein (born 1958) is a French physicist and philosopher of science. He took part in the development of isotopic separation involving lasers and worked on the design of a superconducting particle accelerator. As a science popularizer he has published numerous books about quantum mechanics and the philosophy of time.	IAU · 35655
35683 Broumov	1999 BK_{5}	Broumov, the town in the Czech Republic.	IAU · 35683

== 35701–35800 ==
back to top

Named minor planet	Provisional	This minor planet was named for...	Ref · Catalog
35703 Lafiascaia	1999 FP_{10}	"La fiascaia", the woman who makes the straw coverings often present on Italian wine bottles, such as for chianti	JPL · 35703
35725 Tramuntana	1999 FQ_{59}	Tramuntana, the principal mountain chain of Mallorca, Spain; it is also the name of the north wind	JPL · 35725
35734 Dilithium	1999 GT_{9}	A substance of great power in the science fiction universe of Star Trek, dilithium is an essential component for the faster-than-light warp drive depicted in the stories. In the real world, dilithium is a molecule consisting of two covalently-bonded lithium atoms.	JPL · 35734
35768 Wendybauer	1999 JR_{1}	Wendy Hagen Bauer (born 1950) is a North American professor emerita of astronomy at Wellesley College, where she taught from 1979 to 2015. A dedicated educator, she taught classes ranging from upper level astronomy seminars on stars, to planetary geology.	JPL · 35768
35769 Tombauer	1999 JX_{1}	Thomas J. Bauer (born 1955) is a retired physics instructor at Wellesley College, where he taught from 1986 to 2014. He developed instrumentation to use in both introductory and advanced laboratory classes, and developed software to control data collection from spectrometers to oscilloscopes.	JPL · 35769

== 35801–35900 ==
back to top

Named minor planet	Provisional	This minor planet was named for...	Ref · Catalog
There are no named minor planets in this number range

== 35901–36000 ==
back to top

Named minor planet	Provisional	This minor planet was named for...	Ref · Catalog
35976 Yorktown	1999 MY_{1}	Yorktown, a town in Virginia on the York River leading into the Chesapeake Bay	JPL · 35976
35977 Lexington	1999 NA	Lexington, Massachusetts, "Birthplace of American Liberty"	JPL · 35977
35978 Arlington	1999 NC	Arlington, Massachusetts, site of the heaviest fighting during the first day of the American Revolutionary War on 19 April 1775	JPL · 35978

back to top

Preceded by 34,001–35,000	Meanings of minor-planet names List of minor planets: 35,001–36,000	Succeeded by 36,001–37,000
