= Cevasco =

Cevasco is a surname. Notable people with the surname include:

- Mario Cevasco (1938–1999), Italian water polo player
- Miguel Cevasco (born 1986), Peruvian football player

== See also ==
- 31641 Cevasco, an asteroid
