= Meanings of minor-planet names: 34001–35000 =

As minor planet discoveries are confirmed, they are given a permanent number by the IAU's Minor Planet Center (MPC), and the discoverers can then submit names for them, following the IAU's naming conventions. The list below concerns those minor planets in the specified number-range that have received names, and explains the meanings of those names.

Official naming citations of newly named small Solar System bodies are approved and published in a bulletin by IAU's Working Group for Small Bodies Nomenclature (WGSBN). Before May 2021, citations were published in MPC's Minor Planet Circulars for many decades. Recent citations can also be found on the JPL Small-Body Database (SBDB). Until his death in 2016, German astronomer Lutz D. Schmadel compiled these citations into the Dictionary of Minor Planet Names (DMP) and regularly updated the collection.

Based on Paul Herget's The Names of the Minor Planets, Schmadel also researched the unclear origin of numerous asteroids, most of which had been named prior to World War II. This article incorporates text from this source, which is in the public domain: SBDB New namings may only be added to this list below after official publication as the preannouncement of names is condemned. The WGSBN publishes a comprehensive guideline for the naming rules of non-cometary small Solar System bodies.

== 34001–34100 ==
Named minor planet	Provisional	This minor planet was named for...	Ref · Catalog
34002 Movsesian	2000 OD_{6}	Karina Movsesian (born 1999) was awarded best of category and first place in the 2017 Intel International Science and Engineering Fair for her biochemistry project. She also received the Dudley R. Herschbach Award. She attends the Prvni Ceske Gymnazium v Karlovych Varech, Karlovy Vary, Czech Republic.	JPL · 34002
34003 Ivozell	2000 OU_{6}	Ivo Zell (born 1998) was awarded best of category and first place in the 2017 Intel International Science and Engineering Fair for his engineering mechanics project. He also received the Gordon E. Moore Award. He attends the Internatsschule Schloss Hansenberg, Geisenheim-Johannesberg, Germany.	JPL · 34003
34004 Gregorini	2000 OS_{7}	Loretta Gregorini, astronomer who concentrate in the field of radioastronomy and observational cosmology	JPL · 34004
34010 Tassiloschwarz	2000 OH_{13}	Tassilo Constantin Schwarz (born 1999) was awarded best of category and first place in the 2017 Intel International Science and Engineering Fair for his robotics and intelligent machines project. He also received the Cultural and Scientific Visit to China Award. He attended the Johannes Heidenhain Gymnasium, Traunreut, Germany. Currently, he studies at ETH Zurich.	JPL · 34010
34011 Divyakranthi	2000 OK_{14}	Divya Kranthi (born 2000) was awarded second place in the 2017 Intel International Science and Engineering Fair for her biochemistry team project. She attends the Ambedkar College, Nagpur, India.	JPL · 34011
34012 Prashaant	2000 OD_{15}	Prashaant Ranganathan (born 1999) was awarded best of category and first place in the 2017 Intel International Science and Engineering Fair for his environmental engineering project. He also received the Philip V. Streich Memorial Award. He attends the Carmel Junior College, Jamshedpur, Jharkhand, India.	JPL · 34012
34014 Pingali	2000 OP_{15}	Sahithi Rohini Pingali (born 2000) was awarded second place in the 2017 Intel International Science and Engineering Fair for her earth and environmental sciences project. She attends the Inventure Academy, Bengaluru, Karnataka, India.	JPL · 34014
34016 Chaitanya	2000 OY_{16}	Chaitanya (born 1999) was awarded second place in the 2017 Intel International Science and Engineering Fair for his biomedical engineering team project. He attends the Little Rock Indian School, Brahmavar, Karnataka, India.	JPL · 34016
34017 Geeve	2000 OD_{17}	Geeve (born 1999) was awarded second place in the 2017 Intel International Science and Engineering Fair for his biomedical engineering team project. He attends the Little Rock Indian School, Brahmavar, Karnataka, India.	JPL · 34017
34021 Suhanijain	2000 OW_{22}	Suhani Sachin Jain (born 2000) was awarded second place in the 2017 Intel International Science and Engineering Fair for her biochemistry team project. She attends the Taywade College, Nagpur, India.	JPL · 34021
34024 Cormaclarkin	2000 OO_{24}	Cormac James Larkin (born 1997) was awarded second place in the 2017 Intel International Science and Engineering Fair for his physics and astronomy project. He attends the Colaiste an Spioraid Naoimh, Cork City, Munster, Ireland.	JPL · 34024
34025 Caolannbrady	2000 OX_{24}	Caolann Ellen Brady (born 1999) was awarded second place in the 2017 Intel International Science and Engineering Fair for her biomedical and health sciences project. She attends the St. Wolstan's Community School, Celbridge, Leinster, Ireland.	JPL · 34025
34026 Valpagliarino	2000 OA_{25}	Valerio Pagliarino (born 2000) was awarded best of category and first place in the 2017 Intel International Science and Engineering Fair for his embedded systems project. He also received the Intel Foundation Young Scientist Award. He attends the I.I.S. Nicola Pellati, Nizza Monferrato, Asti, Italy.	JPL · 34026
34028 Wuhuiyi	2000 OP_{25}	Huiyi Wu (born 1999) was awarded second place in the 2017 Intel International Science and Engineering Fair for her energy project. She attends the Ichikawa Gakuen Ichikawa High School, Ichikawa, Chiba, Japan.	JPL · 34028
34030 Tabuchi	2000 OM_{26}	Kotaro Tabuchi (born 1999) was awarded second place in the 2017 Intel International Science and Engineering Fair for his engineering mechanics project. He attends the Nanzan Boys' Senior High School, Nagoya, Aichi, Japan.	JPL · 34030
34031 Fukumitsu	2000 OU_{26}	Nodoka Fukumitsu (born 1998) was awarded second place in the 2017 Intel International Science and Engineering Fair for her animal sciences project. She attends the Shimane Prefectural Masuda High School, Masuda, Shimane, Japan.	JPL · 34031
34034 Shehadeh	2000 OQ_{27}	Ayah Hayel Shehadeh (born 2000) was awarded second place in the 2017 Intel International Science and Engineering Fair for her chemistry team project. She attends the Al-Hasaad Al-Tarbawi School, Amman, Jordan.	JPL · 34034
34038 Abualragheb	2000 OA_{28}	Bayan Osama Abu Alragheb (born 2000) was awarded second place in the 2017 Intel International Science and Engineering Fair for her chemistry team project. She attends the Al-Hasaad Al-Tarbawi School, Amman, Jordan.	JPL · 34038
34039 Torsteinvik	2000 OB_{29}	Torstein Vik (born 1999) was awarded second place in the 2017 Intel International Science and Engineering Fair for his math team project. He attends the Fagerlia Videregaende Skole, Alesund, More og Romsdal, Norway.	JPL · 34039
34042 Espeseth	2000 OQ_{31}	Ane Kristine Espeseth (born 1998) was awarded second place in the 2017 Intel International Science and Engineering Fair for her math team project. She attends the Fagerlia Videregaende Skole, Alesund, More og Romsdal, Norway.	JPL · 34042
34044 Obafial	2000 OZ_{31}	Nadine Antonette Obafial (born 2000) was awarded second place in the 2017 Intel International Science and Engineering Fair for her plant sciences team project. She attends the Davao City National High School, Davao City, Philippines.	JPL · 34044
34047 Gloria	2000 OJ_{35}	Rubeliene Chezka Fernandez Gloria (born 2001) was awarded second place in the 2017 Intel International Science and Engineering Fair for her plant sciences team project. She attends the Davao City National High School, Davao City, Philippines.	JPL · 34047
34049 Myrelleangela	2000 ON_{36}	Myrelle Angela T. Colas (born 2001) was awarded second place in the 2017 Intel International Science and Engineering Fair for her plant sciences team project. She attends the Davao City National High School, Davao City, Philippines.	JPL · 34049
34053 Carlquines	2000 OF_{38}	Carl Joshua Tiangco Quines (born 2000) was awarded second place in the 2017 Intel International Science and Engineering Fair for his math team project. He attends the Valenzuela City School of Mathematics and Science, Valenzuela, Manila, Philippines.	JPL · 34053
34063 Mariamakarova	2000 OA_{49}	Maria Makarova (born 1999) was awarded second place in the 2017 Intel International Science and Engineering Fair for her chemistry team project. She attends the Moscow Chemical Lyceum, Moscow, Russia.	JPL · 34063
34069 Andrewsteele	2000 OZ_{56}	Andrew Steele (b. 1966), a British planetary scientist.	IAU · 34069
34077 Yoshiakifuse	2000 OV_{68}	Yoshiaki Fuse, father of astronomer and Subaru Telescope staff member Tetsuru Fuse	JPL · 34077
34079 Samoylova	2000 PD_{1}	Alexandra Samoylova (born 1999) was awarded second place in the 2017 Intel International Science and Engineering Fair for her chemistry team project. She attends the Moscow Chemical Lyceum, Moscow, Russia.	JPL · 34079
34080 Clarakeng	2000 PE_{1}	Clara Keng (born 1999) was awarded second place in the 2017 Intel International Science and Engineering Fair for her materials science team project. She attends the Raffles Institution, Singapore.	JPL · 34080
34081 Chowkitmun	2000 PH_{1}	Chow Kit Mun (born 1999) was awarded second place in the 2017 Intel International Science and Engineering Fair for her materials science team project. She attends the River Valley High School, Singapore.	JPL · 34081
34083 Feretova	2000 PE_{4}	Miriam Feretova (born 1999) was awarded second place in the 2017 Intel International Science and Engineering Fair for her animal sciences team project. She attends the Grammar School of St. Nicholas, Presov, Presovsky, Slovakia.	JPL · 34083
34088 Satokosuka	2000 PC_{7}	Kosuke Sato, the winner of the 2008 Space Day Award painting competition for elementary school	JPL · 34088
34089 Smoter	2000 PL_{7}	Samuel Smoter (born 1999) was awarded second place in the 2017 Intel International Science and Engineering Fair for his animal sciences team project. He attends the Grammar School of St. Nicholas, Presov, Presovsky, Slovakia.	JPL · 34089
34090 Cewhang	2000 PG_{10}	Clairisse Eunhae Whang (born 2000) was awarded second place in the 2017 Intel International Science and Engineering Fair for her biomedical and health sciences project. She attends the Academy for Medical Science Technology, Hackensack, New Jersey, U.S.A.	JPL · 34090
34100 Thapa	2000 PQ_{13}	Devina Thapa (born 1999) was awarded second place in the 2017 Intel International Science and Engineering Fair for her translational medical science project. She attends the Academy of Science, Sterling, Virginia, U.S.A.	JPL · 34100

== 34101–34200 ==
back to top

Named minor planet	Provisional	This minor planet was named for...	Ref · Catalog
34101 Hesrivastava	2000 PT_{15}	Hemant Srivastava (born 1999) was awarded second place in the 2017 Intel International Science and Engineering Fair for his translational medical science project. He attends the Alabama School of Fine Arts, Birmingham, Alabama, U.S.A.	JPL · 34101
34102 Shawnzhang	2000 PO_{16}	Shawn Brian Zhang (born 2000) was awarded second place in the 2017 Intel International Science and Engineering Fair for his physics and astronomy team project. He attends the Amador Valley, Pleasanton, California, U.S.A.	JPL · 34102
34103 Suganthkannan	2000 PP_{17}	Suganth Kannan (born 1999) was awarded second place in the 2017 Intel International Science and Engineering Fair for his chemistry project. He attends the American Heritage School, Plantation, Florida, U.S.A.	JPL · 34103
34104 Jeremiahpate	2000 PY_{19}	Jeremiah Thomas Pate (born 1998) was awarded best of category and first place in the 2017 Intel International Science and Engineering Fair for his translational medical science project. He also received the Dudley R. Herschbach Award. He attends the BASIS Oro Valley, Arizona.	JPL · 34104
34106 Sakhrani	2000 PP_{22}	Neeraj Sakhrani (born 1999) was awarded second place in the 2017 Intel International Science and Engineering Fair for his earth and environmental sciences project. He attends the Bronx High School of Science, Bronx, New York, U.S.A.	JPL · 34106
34107 Kashfiarahman	2000 PX_{22}	Kashfia Nehrin Rahman (born 2000) was awarded first place in the 2017 Intel International Science and Engineering Fair for her behavioral and social sciences project. She attends the Brookings High School, Brookings, South Dakota, U.S.A.	JPL · 34107
34123 Uedayukika	2000 QD	Yukika Ueda (born 1994), the prizewinner in the 2008 Space-Day Award painting competition	JPL · 34123
34125 Biancospino	2000 QZ	Italian name for Crataegus monogyna, which grows near the observatory where this planet was discovered	IAU · 34125
34126 Cornaa	2000 QA_{1}	Local name for Cornus mas, which grows near the observatory where this planet was discovered	IAU · 34126
34127 Adamnayak	2000 QN_{2}	Adam C. Nayak (born 2000) was awarded best of category and first place in the 2017 Intel International Science and Engineering Fair for his earth and environmental sciences project. He attends the Cleveland High School, Portland, Oregon, U.S.A.	JPL · 34127
34128 Hannahbrown	2000 QO_{2}	Hannah Louise Brown (born 1998) was awarded second place in the 2017 Intel International Science and Engineering Fair for her behavioral and social sciences project. She attends the Dobbs Ferry High School, Dobbs Ferry, New York, U.S.A.	JPL · 34128
34129 Madisonsneve	2000 QN_{3}	Madison Andrea Sneve (born 1999) was awarded first place in the 2017 Intel International Science and Engineering Fair for her cellular and molecular biology project. She attends the duPont Manual High School, Louisville, Kentucky, U.S.A.	JPL · 34129
34130 Isabellaivy	2000 QW_{3}	Isabella Ivy Bowland (born 2000) was awarded best of category and first place in the 2017 Intel International Science and Engineering Fair for her plant sciences project. She attends the Fairview High School, Boulder, Colorado, U.S.A.	JPL · 34130
34132 Theoguerin	2000 QX_{4}	Theo Calvin Guerin (born 1999) was awarded second place in the 2017 Intel International Science and Engineering Fair for his engineering mechanics team project. He attends the Falmouth Academy, Falmouth, Massachusetts, U.S.A.	JPL · 34132
34133 Charlesfenske	2000 QU_{5}	Charles Johannes Fenske (born 1999) was awarded second place in the 2017 Intel International Science and Engineering Fair for his engineering mechanics team project. He attends the Falmouth Academy, Falmouth, Massachusetts, U.S.A.	JPL · 34133
34134 Zlokapa	2000 QW_{5}	Alexander Zlokapa (born 1999) was awarded second place in the 2017 Intel International Science and Engineering Fair for his systems software project. He attends the Golden Hills Academy, Danville, California, U.S.A.	JPL · 34134
34135 Rahulsubra	2000 QX_{5}	Rahul Subramaniam (born 2001) was awarded best of category, first place, and the Scientific and Cultural Visit to India in the 2017 Intel International Science and Engineering Fair for his microbiology project. He attends the Greenwich High School, Greenwich, Connecticut.	JPL · 34135
34137 Lonnielinda	2000 QL_{6}	Lonnie and Linda Wolfe, parents of the American discoverer Chris Wolfe	JPL · 34137
34138 Frasso Sabino	2000 QE_{9}	Frasso Sabino, Italy, which hosts the discovering Frasso Sabino Observatory (157)	JPL · 34138
34139 Lucabarcelo	2000 QU_{10}	Luca Jose Barcelo (born 2000) was awarded second place in the 2017 Intel International Science and Engineering Fair for his environmental engineering project. He attends the Greenwich High School, Greenwich, Connecticut, U.S.A.	JPL · 34139
34141 Antonwu	2000 QZ_{11}	Anton Wu (born 2000) was awarded second place in the 2017 Intel International Science and Engineering Fair for his math project. He attends the Half Hollow Hills High School East, Dix Hills, New York, U.S.A.	JPL · 34141
34142 Sachinkonan	2000 QE_{12}	Sachin Ganesh Konan (born 2000) was awarded second place in the 2017 Intel International Science and Engineering Fair for his embedded systems project. He attends the Hamilton High School, Chandler, Arizona, U.S.A.	JPL · 34142
34143 Heeric	2000 QE_{13}	Eric He (born 2000) was awarded second place in the 2017 Intel International Science and Engineering Fair for his embedded systems project. He attends the High Technology High School, Lincroft, New Jersey, U.S.A.	JPL · 34143
34144 Alexandersun	2000 QX_{14}	Alexander Karl Sun (born 1999) was awarded second place in the 2017 Intel International Science and Engineering Fair for his behavioral and social sciences team project. He attends the Hillcrest High School, Midvale, Utah, U.S.A.	JPL · 34144
34147 Vengadesan	2000 QV_{16}	Suryaprakash Vengadesan (born 2000) was awarded second place in the 2017 Intel International Science and Engineering Fair for his materials science project. He attends the Irvine High School, Irvine, California, U.S.A.	JPL · 34147
34148 Marchuo	2000 QX_{16}	Marc Huo (born 2000) was awarded second place in the 2017 Intel International Science and Engineering Fair for his cellular and molecular biology project. He attends the Jericho High School, Jericho, New York, U.S.A.	JPL · 34148
34152 Kendrazhang	2000 QW_{19}	Kendra Zhang (born 2000) was awarded best of category and first place in the 2017 Intel International Science and Engineering Fair for her energy project. She also received the European Union Contest for Young Scientists Award. She attends the Jericho High School, Jericho, New York, U.S.A.	JPL · 34152
34153 Deeannguo	2000 QZ_{19}	DeeAnn Guo (born 1999) was awarded second place in the 2017 Intel International Science and Engineering Fair for her behavioral and social sciences project. She attends the John Jay High School, Cross River, New York, U.S.A.	JPL · 34153
34154 Anushkanair	2000 QC_{20}	Anushka M. Nair (born 2000) was awarded first place in the 2017 Intel International Science and Engineering Fair for her earth and environmental sciences project. She attends the Lake Oswego High School, Lake Oswego, Oregon, U.S.A.	JPL · 34154
34156 Gopalakrishnan	2000 QT_{22}	Vivek Gopalakrishnan (born 1999) was awarded second place in the 2017 Intel International Science and Engineering Fair for his microbiology project. He attends the Lexington High School, Lexington, Massachusetts, U.S.A.	JPL · 34156
34158 Rachelchang	2000 QB_{24}	Rachel Chang (born 2000) was awarded second place in the 2017 Intel International Science and Engineering Fair for her environmental engineering team project. She attends the Manhasset High School, Manhasset, New York, U.S.A.	JPL · 34158
34159 Ryanthorpe	2000 QJ_{24}	Ryan Matthew Thorpe (born 2000) was awarded second place in the 2017 Intel International Science and Engineering Fair for his environmental engineering team project. He attends the Manhasset High School, Manhasset, New York, U.S.A.	JPL · 34159
34161 Michaellee	2000 QC_{27}	Michael Yoomin Lee (born 1998) was awarded best of category and first place in the 2017 Intel International Science and Engineering Fair for his systems software project. He also received the Intel Foundation Cultural and Scientific Visit to China Award. He attends the Manhasset High School, Manhasset, New York, U.S.A.	JPL · 34161
34162 Yegnesh	2000 QV_{27}	Karthik Yegnesh (born 2000) was awarded best of category and first place in the 2017 Intel International Science and Engineering Fair for his math project. He also received the Intel Foundation Cultural and Scientific Visit to China Award. He attends the Methacton High School, Eagleville, Pennsylvania, U.S.A.	JPL · 34162
34163 Neyveli	2000 QY_{27}	Pranav Sundar Neyveli (born 2000) was awarded second place in the 2017 Intel International Science and Engineering Fair for his computational biology and bioinformatics project. He attends the Mills E. Godwin High School, Henrico, Virginia, U.S.A.	JPL · 34163
34164 Anikacheerla	2000 QQ_{28}	Anika Cheerla (born 2001) was awarded second place in the 2017 Intel International Science and Engineering Fair for her robotics and intelligent machines team project. She attends the Monta Vista High School, Cupertino, California, U.S.A.	JPL · 34164
34165 Nikhilcheerla	2000 QW_{28}	Nikhil Cheerla (born 1999) was awarded second place in the 2017 Intel International Science and Engineering Fair for his robotics and intelligent machines team project. He attends the Monta Vista High School, Cupertino, California, U.S.A.	JPL · 34165
34166 Neildeshmukh	2000 QQ_{30}	Neil Deshmukh (born 2002) was awarded second place in the 2017 Intel International Science and Engineering Fair for his systems software project. He attends the Moravian Academy, Bethlehem, Pennsylvania, U.S.A.	JPL · 34166
34172 Camillemiles	2000 QU_{37}	Camille Alden Miles (born 1999) was awarded best of category and first place in the 2017 Intel International Science and Engineering Fair for her energy project. She also received the Intel Foundation Cultural and Scientific Visit to China Award. She attends the Niceville High School, Niceville, Florida, U.S.A.	JPL · 34172
34175 Joshuadong	2000 QG_{39}	Joshua Dong (born 1999) was awarded second place in the 2017 Intel International Science and Engineering Fair for his engineering mechanics project. He attends the North Carolina School of Science and Mathematics, Durham, North Carolina, U.S.A.	JPL · 34175
34176 Balamurugan	2000 QT_{39}	Vishaal N. Balamurugan (born 2000) was awarded second place in the 2017 Intel International Science and Engineering Fair for his biochemistry project. He attends the North Oldham High School, Goshen, Kentucky, U.S.A.	JPL · 34176
34177 Amandawilson	2000 QD_{40}	Amanda Grace Wilson (born 2000) was awarded first place in the 2017 Intel International Science and Engineering Fair for her plant sciences project. She attends the Northwestern High School, Kokomo, Indiana, U.S.A.	JPL · 34177
34178 Sarahmarie	2000 QM_{41}	Sarah Marie Romanelli (born 1999) was awarded second place in the 2017 Intel International Science and Engineering Fair for her translational medical science project. She attends the Oceanside High School, Oceanside, New York, U.S.A.	JPL · 34178
34179 Bryanchun	2000 QT_{41}	Bryan Hoo Hao Chun (born 1998) was awarded second place in the 2017 Intel International Science and Engineering Fair for his energy project. He attends the Oregon Episcopal School, Portland, Oregon, U.S.A.	JPL · 34179
34180 Jessicayoung	2000 QP_{42}	Jessica E. Young (born 1998) was awarded best of category and first place in the 2017 Intel International Science and Engineering Fair for her animal sciences project. She attends the Palm Beach Central High School, Wellington, Florida, U.S.A.	JPL · 34180
34181 Patnaik	2000 QT_{42}	Ritik Patnaik (born 2001) was awarded second place in the 2017 Intel International Science and Engineering Fair for his systems software project. He attends the Plano East Senior High School, Plano, Texas, U.S.A.	JPL · 34181
34182 Sachan	2000 QC_{44}	Kshitij Sachan (born 2000) was awarded second place in the 2017 Intel International Science and Engineering Fair for his cellular and molecular biology team project. He attends the Plano East Senior High School, Plano, Texas, U.S.A.	JPL · 34182
34183 Yeshdoctor	2000 QG_{44}	Yesh Satyajit Doctor (born 2000) was awarded second place in the 2017 Intel International Science and Engineering Fair for his cellular and molecular biology team project. He attends the Plano East Senior High School, Plano, Texas, U.S.A.	JPL · 34183
34184 Hegde	2000 QZ_{44}	Sahil Hegde (born 1999) was awarded second place in the 2017 Intel International Science and Engineering Fair for his physics and astronomy team project. He attends the Prospect High School, Saratoga, California, U.S.A.	JPL · 34184
34187 Tomaino	2000 QW_{47}	Shane Tomaino (born 2000) was awarded first place in the 2017 Intel International Science and Engineering Fair for her engineering mechanics project. She attends the Rye Country Day School, Rye, New York, U.S.A.	JPL · 34187
34188 Clarawagner	2000 QB_{48}	Clara Elizabeth Wagner (born 1998) was awarded best of category, first place, and the Scientific and Cultural Visit to India Awards in the 2017 Intel International Science and Engineering Fair for her biomedical engineering project. She attends the Saginaw Arts and Sciences Academy, Saginaw, Michigan.	JPL · 34188
34189 Ambatipudi	2000 QD_{48}	Mythri Ambatipudi (born 2000) was awarded second place in the 2017 Intel International Science and Engineering Fair for her computational biology and bioinformatics project. She attends the Saint Francis High School, Mountain View, California, U.S.A.	JPL · 34189
34190 Erinsmith	2000 QA_{49}	Erin Smith (born 1999) was awarded best of category and first place in the 2017 Intel International Science and Engineering Fair for her behavioral and social sciences project. She also received the Cultural and Scientific Visit to China Award. She attends the Shawnee Mission West High School, Overland Park, Kansas, U.S.A.	JPL · 34190
34191 Jakhete	2000 QR_{49}	Shantanu Jakhete (born 2000) was awarded first place in the 2017 Intel International Science and Engineering Fair for his animal sciences project. He attends the South Fork High School, Stuart, Florida, U.S.A.	JPL · 34191
34192 Sappington	2000 QE_{50}	James Donovan Sappington (born 2001) was awarded second place in the 2017 Intel International Science and Engineering Fair for his earth and environmental sciences project. He attends the South River High School, Edgewater, Maryland, U.S.A.	JPL · 34192
34193 Annakoonce	2000 QT_{52}	Anna Colleen Koonce (born 2000) was awarded second place in the 2017 Intel International Science and Engineering Fair for her plant sciences project. She attends the St. Joseph's Academy, Baton Rouge, Louisiana, U.S.A.	JPL · 34193
34194 Serenajing	2000 QW_{52}	Serena Liang Jing (born 1998) was awarded second place in the 2017 Intel International Science and Engineering Fair for her biomedical engineering project. She attends the St. Paul Central High School, St. Paul, Minnesota, U.S.A.	JPL · 34194
34197 Susrinivasan	2000 QD_{54}	Suraj Sai Srinivasan (born 2000) was awarded first place in the 2017 Intel International Science and Engineering Fair for his biomedical engineering project. He attends the Strongsville High School, Strongsville, Ohio, U.S.A.	JPL · 34197
34198 Oliverleitner	2000 QM_{54}	Oliver Leitner (born 2000) was awarded second place in the 2017 Intel International Science and Engineering Fair for his energy project. He attends the Davidson Academy of Nevada, Reno, Nevada, U.S.A.	JPL · 34198
34199 Amyjin	2000 QV_{54}	Amy Yue Jin (born 2000) was awarded second place in the 2017 Intel International Science and Engineering Fair for her robotics and intelligent machines project. She attends the Harker School, San Jose, California, U.S.A.	JPL · 34199
34200 Emmasun	2000 QW_{54}	Emma Sun (born 2002) was awarded second place in the 2017 Intel International Science and Engineering Fair for her behavioral and social sciences team project. She attends the Waterford School, Sandy, Utah, U.S.A.	JPL · 34200

== 34201–34300 ==
back to top

Named minor planet	Provisional	This minor planet was named for...	Ref · Catalog
34202 Sionaprasad	2000 QB_{55}	Siona Prasad (born 2001) was awarded second place in the 2017 Intel International Science and Engineering Fair for her earth and environmental sciences project. She attends the Thomas Jefferson High School for Science and Technology, Alexandria, Virginia, U.S.A.	JPL · 34202
34204 Quryshi	2000 QR_{55}	Nabeel Jami Quryshi (born 2000) was awarded first place in the 2017 Intel International Science and Engineering Fair for his biomedical and health sciences project. He attends the University School of Milwaukee, Milwaukee, Wisconsin, U.S.A.	JPL · 34204
34205 Mizerak	2000 QR_{57}	Evan James Mizerak (born 1999) was awarded second place in the 2017 Intel International Science and Engineering Fair for his animal sciences project. He attends the Wachusett Regional High School, Holden, Massachusetts, U.S.A.	JPL · 34205
34206 Zhiyuewang	2000 QM_{60}	Zhiyue Wang (born 1999) was awarded second place in the 2017 Intel International Science and Engineering Fair for her biomedical and health sciences project. She attends the West Lafayette Junior-Senior High School, West Lafayette, Indiana, U.S.A.	JPL · 34206
34208 Danielzhang	2000 QR_{66}	Daniel Danxu Zhang (born 1999) was awarded best of category and first place in the 2017 Intel International Science and Engineering Fair for his biomedical and health sciences project. He also received the Philip V. Streich Memorial Award. He attends the Westview High School, San Diego, California, U.S.A.	JPL · 34208
34215 Stutigarg	2000 QD_{72}	Stuti Paavani Garg (born 2000) was awarded second place in the 2017 Intel International Science and Engineering Fair for her microbiology project. She attends the Westview High School, Portland, Oregon, U.S.A.	JPL · 34215
34218 Padiyath	2000 QC_{78}	Manashree Seth Padiyath (born 2002) was awarded first place in the 2017 Intel International Science and Engineering Fair for her environmental engineering project. She attends the Woodbury High School, Woodbury, Minnesota, U.S.A.	JPL · 34218
34219 Megantang	2000 QM_{80}	Megan Taiyue Tang (born 2000) was awarded second place in the 2017 Intel International Science and Engineering Fair for her earth and environmental sciences project. She attends the York School, Monterey, California, U.S.A.	JPL · 34219
34220 Pelagiamajoni	2000 QO_{84}	Pelagia Maria Majoni (born 1999) was awarded second place in the 2017 Intel International Science and Engineering Fair for her energy project. She attends the Queen Elizabeth Girls High School, Harare, Zimbabwe.	JPL · 34220
34224 Maggiechen	2000 QG_{87}	Maggie Shin-Young Chen (born 2000) was a finalist in the 2018 Regeneron STS, and was awarded 1st place at the 2017 International Science and Engineering Fair for her bioengineering project. She attends the Canyon Crest Academy, San Diego, California.	JPL · 34224
34225 Fridberg	2000 QT_{87}	Kyle Oskar Fridberg (born 2000) was a finalist in the 2018 Regeneron STS, and was awarded best of category, 1st place and the Scientific and Cultural Visit to India Award at the 2017 International Science and Engineering Fair for his chemistry project. He attends the Fairview High School, Boulder, Colorado.	JPL · 34225
34227 Daveyhuang	2000 QX_{89}	Davey H. Huang (born 1999) was a finalist in the 2018 Regeneron STS, and was awarded best of category and 1st place at the 2017 International Science and Engineering Fair for his cellular and molecular biology project. He attends the Iolani School, Honolulu, Hawaii.	JPL · 34227
34231 Isanisingh	2000 QL_{93}	Isani Singh (born 1999) was a finalist in the 2018 Regeneron STS, and was awarded 2nd place at the 2017 International Science and Engineering Fair for her genomics project. She attends the Cherry Creek High School, Greenwood Village, Colorado.	JPL · 34231
34233 Caldwell	2000 QD_{95}	Reese Caldwell (born 2000) is a finalist in the 2018 Regeneron Science Talent Search (STS), a science competition for high school seniors, for his bioengineering project. He attends the Conestoga High School, Berwyn, Pennsylvania.	JPL · 34233
34234 Andrewfang	2000 QS_{95}	Andrew Fang (born 2000) is a finalist in the 2018 Regeneron Science Talent Search (STS), a science competition for high school seniors, for his medicine and health project. He attends the Jericho Senior High School, Jericho, New York.	JPL · 34234
34235 Ellafeiner	2000 QZ_{95}	Ella Feiner (born 1999) is a finalist in the 2018 Regeneron Science Talent Search (STS), a science competition for high school seniors, for her cellular and molecular biology project. She attends the Horace Mann School, Bronx, New York.	JPL · 34235
34236 Firester	2000 QJ_{96}	Benjamin J. Firester (born 1999) is a finalist in the 2018 Regeneron Science Talent Search (STS), a science competition for high school seniors, for his plant sciences project. He attends the Hunter College High School, New York, New York.	JPL · 34236
34237 Sarahgao	2000 QO_{96}	Sarah Gao (born 2000) is a finalist in the 2018 Regeneron Science Talent Search (STS), a science competition for high school seniors, for her cellular and molecular biology project. She attends the Montgomery Blair High School, Silver Spring, Maryland.	JPL · 34237
34239 Louisgolowich	2000 QX_{96}	Louis Golowich (born 2000) is a finalist in the 2018 Regeneron Science Talent Search (STS), a science competition for high school seniors, for his computer science project. He attends Harvard University.	JPL · 34239
34240 Charleyhutch	2000 QP_{98}	Charley Hutchison (born 2000) is a finalist in the 2018 Regeneron Science Talent Search (STS), a science competition for high school seniors, for his chemistry project. He attends the St. Andrew's Episcopal School, Ridgeland, Mississippi.	JPL · 34240
34241 Skylerjones	2000 QZ_{98}	Skyler Chloe Jones (born 2000) is a finalist in the 2018 Regeneron Science Talent Search (STS), a science competition for high school seniors, for her chemistry project. She attends the Ossining High School, Ossining, New York.	JPL · 34241
34245 Andrewkomo	2000 QG_{101}	Andrew Komo (born 2000) is a finalist in the 2018 Regeneron Science Talent Search (STS), a science competition for high school seniors, for his computer science project. He attends the Montgomery Blair High School, Silver Spring, Maryland.	JPL · 34245
34246 Kopparapu	2000 QO_{102}	Kavya Kopparapu (born 2000) is a finalist in the 2018 Regeneron Science Talent Search (STS), a science competition for high school seniors, for her computational biology and bioinformatics project. She attends the Thomas Jefferson High School for Science and Technology, Alexandria, Virginia.	JPL · 34246
34249 Leolo	2000 QY_{108}	Chiu Fan Bowen Lo (born 1999) is a finalist in the 2018 Regeneron Science Talent Search (STS), a science competition for high school seniors, for his physics project. He attends the Jericho Senior High School, Jericho, New York.	JPL · 34249
34250 Mamichael	2000 QA_{112}	Michael Yuanchao Ma (born 2000) is a finalist in the 2018 Regeneron Science Talent Search (STS), a science competition for high school seniors, for his mathematics project. He attends the Plano West Senior High School, Plano, Texas.	JPL · 34250
34251 Rohanmehrotra	2000 QR_{112}	Rohan Mehrotra (born 2000) is a finalist in the 2018 Regeneron Science Talent Search (STS), a science competition for high school seniors, for her chemistry project. She attends the Lynbrook High School, San Jose, California.	JPL · 34251
34252 Orlovsky	2000 QE_{113}	Natalia Orlovsky (born 2000) is a finalist in the 2018 Regeneron Science Talent Search (STS), a science competition for high school seniors, for her cellular and molecular biology project. She attends the Garnet Valley High School, Glen Mills, Pennsylvania.	JPL · 34252
34253 Nitya	2000 QH_{114}	Nitya Parthasarathy (born 2000) is a finalist in the 2018 Regeneron Science Talent Search (STS), a science competition for high school seniors, for her behavioral and social sciences project. She attends the Northwood High School, Irvine, California.	JPL · 34253
34254 Mihirpatel	2000 QN_{114}	Mihir Vipul Patel (born 2000) is a finalist in the 2018 Regeneron Science Talent Search (STS), a science competition for high school seniors, for his computer science project. He attends the Thomas Jefferson High School for Science and Technology, Alexandria, Virginia.	JPL · 34254
34256 Advaitpatil	2000 QK_{116}	Advait Patil (born 2000) is a finalist in the 2018 Regeneron Science Talent Search (STS), a science competition for high school seniors, for his genomics project. He attends the Lynbrook High School, San Jose, California.	JPL · 34256
34258 Pentland	2000 QO_{119}	Dylan Pentland (born 1999) is a finalist in the 2018 Regeneron Science Talent Search (STS), a science competition for high school seniors, for his mathematics project. He attends the Newman School, Boston, Massachusetts.	JPL · 34258
34259 Abprabhakaran	2000 QS_{119}	Abilash Prabhakaran (born 2000) is a finalist in the 2018 Regeneron Science Talent Search (STS), a science competition for high school seniors, for his cellular and molecular biology project. He attends the Cherry Creek High School, Greenwood Village, Colorado.	JPL · 34259
34261 Musharahman	2000 QK_{120}	Muhammad Shahir Rahman (born 2000) is a finalist in the 2018 Regeneron Science Talent Search (STS), a science competition for high school seniors, for his engineering project. He attends the Westview High School, Portland, Oregon.	JPL · 34261
34262 Michaelren	2000 QP_{120}	Michael Ren (born 2000) is a finalist in the 2018 Regeneron Science Talent Search (STS), a science competition for high school seniors, for his mathematics project. He attends the Phillips Academy, Andover, Massachusetts.	JPL · 34262
34264 Sadhuka	2000 QN_{124}	Shuvom Sadhuka (born 1999) is a finalist in the 2018 Regeneron Science Talent Search (STS), a science competition for high school seniors, for his physics project. He attends the Cambridge Rindge and Latin School, Cambridge, Massachusetts.	JPL · 34264
34266 Schweinfurth	2000 QF_{125}	Raley Schweinfurth (born 1999) is a finalist in the 2018 Regeneron Science Talent Search (STS), a science competition for high school seniors, for her environmental science project. She attends the Oregon Episcopal School, Portland, Oregon.	JPL · 34266
34267 Haniya	2000 QC_{126}	Haniya Shareef (born 2000) is a finalist in the 2018 Regeneron Science Talent Search (STS), a science competition for high school seniors, for her plant sciences project. She attends the Lincoln Park Academy, Fort Pierce, Florida.	JPL · 34267
34268 Gracetian	2000 QP_{128}	Grace Tian (born 2000) is a finalist in the 2018 Regeneron Science Talent Search (STS), a science competition for high school seniors, for her mathematics project. She attends the Wellington School, Columbus, Ohio.	JPL · 34268
34271 Vinjaivale	2000 QH_{132}	Vinjai Vale (born 2000) is a finalist in the 2018 Regeneron Science Talent Search (STS), a science competition for high school seniors, for his computer science project. He attends the Phillips Exeter Academy, Exeter, New Hampshire.	JPL · 34271
34272 Veeramacheneni	2000 QQ_{132}	Teja Sai Veeramacheneni (born 2000) is a finalist in the 2018 Regeneron Science Talent Search (STS), a science competition for high school seniors, for his computer science project. He attends the Archbishop Mitty High School, San Jose, California.	JPL · 34272
34273 Franklynwang	2000 QS_{134}	Franklyn Hai Wang (born 2000) is a finalist in the 2018 Regeneron Science Talent Search (STS), a science competition for high school seniors, for his mathematics project. He attends the Thomas Jefferson High School for Science and Technology, Alexandria, Virginia.	JPL · 34273
34277 Davidxingwu	2000 QH_{138}	David Xing Wu (born 2000) is a finalist in the 2018 Regeneron Science Talent Search (STS), a science competition for high school seniors, for his mathematics project. He attends the Montgomery Blair High School, Silver Spring, Maryland.	JPL · 34277
34278 Justinxie	2000 QE_{139}	Justin Long Xie (born 2000) is a finalist in the 2018 Regeneron Science Talent Search (STS), a science competition for high school seniors, for his space science project. He attends the Harker School, San Jose, California.	JPL · 34278
34279 Alicezhang	2000 QJ_{139}	Alice Anran Zhang (born 2000) is a finalist in the 2018 Regeneron Science Talent Search (STS), a science competition for high school seniors, for her computer science project. She attends the Montgomery Blair High School, Silver Spring, Maryland.	JPL · 34279
34280 Victoradler	2000 QP_{140}	Victor Adler mentored a finalist in the 2018 Regeneron Science Talent Search, a science competition for high school seniors. He teaches at the Harker School, San Jose, California.	JPL · 34280
34281 Albritton	2000 QR_{141}	Daniel Albritton mentored a finalist in the 2018 Regeneron Science Talent Search, a science competition for high school seniors. He teaches at the Fairview High School, Boulder, Colorado.	JPL · 34281
34282 Applegate	2000 QX_{142}	John Applegate mentored a finalist in the 2018 Regeneron Science Talent Search, a science competition for high school seniors. He teaches at the St. Andrew's Episcopal School, Ridgeland, Mississippi.	JPL · 34282
34283 Bagley	2000 QM_{146}	Michelle Bagley mentored a finalist in the 2018 Regeneron Science Talent Search, a science competition for high school seniors. She teaches at the Centennial High School, Ellicott City, Maryland.	JPL · 34283
34284 Seancampbell	2000 QR_{146}	Sean Campbell mentored a finalist in the 2018 Regeneron Science Talent Search, a science competition for high school seniors. He teaches at the Phillips Exeter Academy, Exeter, New Hampshire.	JPL · 34284
34285 Dorothydady	2000 QA_{147}	Dorothy Dady mentored a finalist in the 2018 Regeneron Science Talent Search, a science competition for high school seniors. She teaches at the Cherry Creek High School, Greenwood Village, Colorado.	JPL · 34285
34288 Bevindaglen	2000 QU_{149}	Bevin Daglen mentored a finalist in the 2018 Regeneron Science Talent Search, a science competition for high school seniors. She teaches at the Oregon Episcopal School, Portland, Oregon.	JPL · 34288
34289 Johndell	2000 QC_{150}	John Dell mentored a finalist in the 2018 Regeneron Science Talent Search, a science competition for high school seniors. He teaches at the Thomas Jefferson High School for Science and Technology, Alexandria, Virginia.	JPL · 34289
34293 Khiemdoba	2000 QJ_{152}	Khiem Doba mentored a finalist in the 2018 Regeneron Science Talent Search, a science competition for high school seniors. He teaches at the Phillips Academy, Andover, Massachusetts.	JPL · 34293
34294 Taylordufford	2000 QM_{152}	Taylor Dufford mentored a finalist in the 2018 Regeneron Science Talent Search, a science competition for high school seniors. He teaches at the Cherry Creek High School, Greenwood Village, Colorado.	JPL · 34294
34297 Willfrazer	2000 QH_{156}	Will Frazer mentored a finalist in the 2018 Regeneron Science Talent Search, a science competition for high school seniors. He teaches at the Buchholz High School, Gainesville, Florida.	JPL · 34297
34300 Brendafrost	2000 QV_{166}	Brenda Frost mentored a finalist in the 2018 Regeneron Science Talent Search, a science competition for high school seniors. She teaches at the Garnet Valley High School, Glen Mills, Pennsylvania.	JPL · 34300

== 34301–34400 ==
back to top

Named minor planet	Provisional	This minor planet was named for...	Ref · Catalog
34302 Riagalanos	2000 QU_{172}	Ria Galanos mentored a finalist in the 2018 Regeneron Science Talent Search, a science competition for high school seniors. She teaches at the Thomas Jefferson High School for Science and Technology, Alexandria, Virginia.	JPL · 34302
34304 Alainagarza	2000 QB_{178}	Alaina Garza mentored a finalist in the 2018 Regeneron Science Talent Search, a science competition for high school seniors. She teaches at the Clear Brook High School, Friendswood, Texas.	JPL · 34304
34307 Arielhaas	2000 QT_{183}	Ariel Haas mentored a finalist in the 2018 Regeneron Science Talent Search, a science competition for high school seniors. Haas teaches at Canyon Crest Academy, San Diego, California.	JPL · 34307
34308 Roberthall	2000 QC_{185}	Robert L. Hall mentored a finalist in the 2018 Regeneron Science Talent Search, a science competition for high school seniors. He teaches at the Newman School, Boston, Massachusetts.	JPL · 34308
34310 Markhannum	2000 QA_{187}	Mark G. Hannum mentored a finalist in the 2018 Regeneron Science Talent Search, a science competition for high school seniors. He teaches at the Thomas Jefferson High School for Science and Technology, Alexandria, Virginia.	JPL · 34310
34312 Deahaupt	2000 QO_{188}	Dea Michael Haupt mentored a finalist in the 2018 Regeneron Science Talent Search, a science competition for high school seniors. She teaches at the Lexington High School, Lexington, Massachusetts.	JPL · 34312
34313 Lisahevner	2000 QQ_{188}	Lisa R. Hevner mentored a finalist in the 2018 Regeneron Science Talent Search, a science competition for high school seniors. She teaches at the Lincoln Park Academy, Fort Pierce, Florida.	JPL · 34313
34314 Jasonlee	2000 QN_{189}	Jason Lee mentored a finalist in the 2018 Regeneron Science Talent Search, a science competition for high school seniors. He teaches at the Lynbrook High School, San Jose, California.	JPL · 34314
34316 Christineleo	2000 QS_{190}	Christine Leo mentored a finalist in the 2018 Regeneron Science Talent Search, a science competition for high school seniors. She teaches at the Horace Mann School, Bronx, New York.	JPL · 34316
34317 Fabianmak	2000 QH_{191}	Fabian Mak mentored a finalist in the 2018 Regeneron Science Talent Search, a science competition for high school seniors. He teaches at the Westview High School, Portland, Oregon.	JPL · 34317
34319 Neilmilburn	2000 QD_{193}	Neil Milburn mentored a finalist in the 2018 Regeneron Science Talent Search, a science competition for high school seniors. He teaches at the Plano West Senior High School, Plano, Texas.	JPL · 34319
34320 Davidmonge	2000 QU_{195}	David R. Monge mentored a finalist in the 2018 Regeneron Science Talent Search, a science competition for high school seniors. He teaches at the Northwood High School, Irvine, California.	JPL · 34320
34321 Russellmotter	2000 QY_{195}	Russell Motter mentored a finalist in the 2018 Regeneron Science Talent Search, a science competition for high school seniors. He teaches at the Iolani School, Honolulu, Hawaii.	JPL · 34321
34322 Marknandor	2000 QW_{196}	Mark Nandor mentored a finalist in the 2018 Regeneron Science Talent Search, a science competition for high school seniors. He teaches at the Wellington School, Columbus, Ohio.	JPL · 34322
34323 Williamrose	2000 QN_{198}	William Rose mentored a finalist in the 2018 Regeneron Science Talent Search, a science competition for high school seniors. He teaches at the Montgomery Blair High School, Silver Spring, Maryland.	JPL · 34323
34324 Jeremyschwartz	2000 QB_{199}	Jeremy Schwartz mentored a finalist in the 2018 Regeneron Science Talent Search, a science competition for high school seniors. He teaches at the Montgomery Blair High School, Silver Spring, Maryland.	JPL · 34324
34325 Terrencevale	2000 QN_{201}	Terrence Vale mentored a finalist in the 2018 Regeneron Science Talent Search, a science competition for high school seniors. He teaches at the Broad Run High School, Ashburn, Virginia.	JPL · 34325
34326 Zhaurova	2000 QF_{202}	Irene Zhaurova mentored a finalist in the 2018 Regeneron Science Talent Search, a science competition for high school seniors. She teaches at the Cambridge Rindge and Latin School, Cambridge, Massachusetts.	JPL · 34326
34328 Jackalbright	2000 QR_{204}	Jack Dualan Albright (b. 2004) was a finalist in the 2018 Broadcom MASTERS, a math and science competition for middle school students, for his computer science and software engineering project. He attended the Nueva School, Hillsborough, California.	IAU · 34328
34329 Sribhimaraju	2000 QO_{206}	Sriram Venugopal Bhimaraju (b. 2006) was a finalist in the 2018 Broadcom MASTERS, a math and science competition for middle school students, for his computer science and software engineering project. He attended the Harker School, San Jose, California.	IAU · 34329
34330 Bissoondial	2000 QB_{209}	Tyler Logan Bissoondial (b. 2005) was a finalist in the 2018 Broadcom MASTERS, a math and science competition for middle school students, for his plant science project. He attended the Grand Avenue Middle School, Bellmore, New York.	IAU · 34330
34331 Annadu	2000 QH_{209}	Anna Du (b. 2005) was a finalist in the 2018 Broadcom MASTERS, a math and science competition for middle school students, for her plant science project. She attended the Andover School of Montessori, Andover, Massachusetts.	IAU · 34331
34332 Alicefeng	2000 QU_{209}	Alice Feng (b. 2004) was a finalist in the 2018 Broadcom MASTERS, a math and science competition for middle school students, for her materials & bioengineering project. She attended the Harker School, San Jose, California.	IAU · 34332
34333 Roycorgross	2000 QG_{211}	Roy Corrado Gross (b. 2004) was a finalist in the 2018 Broadcom MASTERS, a math and science competition for middle school students, for his electrical and mechanical engineering project. He attended the Terman Middle School, Palo Alto, California.	IAU · 34333
34334 Georgiagrace	2000 QG_{212}	Georgia Grace Hutchinson (b. 2004) was a finalist in the 2018 Broadcom MASTERS, a math and science competition for middle school students, for her energy and sustainability project. She attended the Woodside Elementary School, Woodside, California.	IAU · 34334
34335 Ahmadismail	2000 QR_{214}	Ahmad Ismail (b. 2004) was a finalist in the 2018 Broadcom MASTERS, a math and science competition for middle school students, for his microbiology and biochemistry project. He attended the Granada Islamic School, Santa Clara, California.	IAU · 34335
34336 Willjenkins	2000 QT_{214}	William Vaughn Jenkins (b. 2004) was a finalist in the 2018 Broadcom MASTERS, a math and science competition for middle school students, for his electrical and mechanical engineering project. He attended the Westminster Schools, Atlanta, Georgia.	IAU · 34336
34337 Mihirjoshi	2000 QR_{215}	Mihir Nitin Joshi (b. 2005) was a finalist in the 2018 Broadcom MASTERS, a math and science competition for middle school students, for his physics project. He attended the Leslie Middle School, Salem, Oregon.	IAU · 34337
34338 Shreyaskar	2000 QM_{216}	Shreyas Kar (b. 2004) was a finalist in the 2018 Broadcom MASTERS, a math and science competition for middle school students, for his computer science and software engineering project. He attended the Meyzeek Middle School, Louisville, Kentucky.	IAU · 34338
34342 Asmikumar	2000 QK_{227}	Asmi Kumar (b. 2003) was a finalist in the 2018 Broadcom MASTERS, a math and science competition for middle school students, for her materials & bioengineering project. She attended the Northwestern Middle School, Milton, Georgia.	IAU · 34342
34343 Kumaran	2000 QU_{227}	Janani Sarjana Kumaran (b. 2003) was a finalist in the 2018 Broadcom MASTERS, a math and science competition for middle school students, for his plant science project. He attended the Abraham Lincoln Middle School, Gainesville, Florida.	IAU · 34343
34345 Gabriellalui	2000 RY	Gabriella Lui (b. 2004) was a finalist in the 2018 Broadcom MASTERS, a math and science competition for middle school students, for her electrical and mechanical engineering project. She attended the Quest Academy, Palatine, Illinois.	IAU · 34345
34346 Varunmadan	2000 RJ_{1}	Varun Raj Madan (b. 2004) was a finalist in the 2018 Broadcom MASTERS, a math and science competition for middle school students, for his animal science project. He attended the Lake Highland Preparatory School, Orlando, Florida.	IAU · 34346
34351 Decatur	2000 RZ_{8}	Decatur, Alabama, the discovery site (Emerald Lane Observatory)	JPL · 34351
34354 Johnmadland	2000 RL_{18}	John William Madland (b. 2004) was a finalist in the 2018 Broadcom MASTERS, a math and science competition for middle school students, for his physics project. He attended the Leslie Middle School, Salem, Oregon.	IAU · 34354
34355 Mefford	2000 RB_{20}	Lillian Elise Mefford (b. 2004) was a finalist in the 2018 Broadcom MASTERS, a math and science competition for middle school students, for her environmental and earth sciences project. She attended the Surfside Middle School, Panama City Beach, Florida.	IAU · 34355
34356 Gahamuriel	2000 RR_{20}	Gabriela Hamaty Muriel (b. 2003) was a finalist in the 2018 Broadcom MASTERS, a math and science competition for middle school students, for her physics project. She attended the Saint Rose of Lima Catholic School, Miami Shores, Florida.	IAU · 34356
34357 Amaraorth	2000 RO_{21}	Amara Jean Orth (b. 2004) was a finalist in the 2018 Broadcom MASTERS, a math and science competition for middle school students, for her chemistry project. She attended the Lewis Central Middle School, Council Bluffs, Iowa.	IAU · 34357
34363 Prawira	2000 RT_{30}	Jacqueline Prawira (b. 2004) was a finalist in the 2018 Broadcom MASTERS, a math and science competition for middle school students, for her chemistry project. She attended the Altamont Elementary School, Mountain House, California.	IAU · 34363
34364 Katequinn	2000 RZ_{30}	Kate Elise Quinn (b. 2006) was a finalist in the 2018 Broadcom MASTERS, a math and science competition for middle-school students, for her microbiology and biochemistry project. She attended the Saint Francis of Assisi Catholic School, Louisville, Kentucky.	IAU · 34364
34365 Laurareilly	2000 RS_{34}	Laura Maria Reilly (b. 2003) was a finalist in the 2018 Broadcom MASTERS, a math and science competition for middle-school students, for her medicine and health sciences project. She attended the Saint Matthew Catholic School, San Antonio, Texas.	IAU · 34365
34366 Rosavestal	2000 RP_{36}	Rosa Vallee Warner, née Vestal, the discoverer's mother	JPL · 34366
34367 Kennedyrogers	2000 RQ_{40}	Kennedy Sophia Rogers (b. 2005) was a finalist in the 2018 Broadcom MASTERS, a math and science competition for middle-school students, for her physics project. She attended the Chapel Hill Middle School, Douglasville, Georgia.	IAU · 34367
34372 Bentleysiems	2000 RS_{44}	Bentley Louis Siems (b. 2005) was a finalist in the 2018 Broadcom MASTERS, a math and science competition for middle-school students, for his microbiology and biochemistry project. He attended the Delta Woods Middle School, Lee's Summit, Missouri.	IAU · 34372
34379 Slettnes	2000 RU_{55}	Espen Slettnes (b. 2005) was a finalist in the 2018 Broadcom MASTERS, a math and science competition for middle-school students, for his mathematics project. He is homeschooled in Castro Valley, California.	IAU · 34379
34380 Pratikvangal	2000 RV_{55}	Pratik Sriram Vangal (b. 2003) was a finalist in the 2018 Broadcom MASTERS, a math and science competition for middle-school students, for his energy and sustainability project. He attended the Stoller Middle School, Portland, Oregon.	IAU · 34380
34387 Venkatesh	2000 RX_{62}	Akshaya Venkatesh (b. 2004) was a finalist in the 2018 Broadcom MASTERS, a math and science competition for middle-school students, for her behavioral and social sciences project. She attended the BASIS Scottsdale, Scottsdale, Arizona.	IAU · 34387
34388 Wylonis	2000 RE_{63}	Leo Edward Wylonis (b. 2004) was a finalist in the 2018 Broadcom MASTERS, a math and science competition for middle-school students, for his electrical and mechanical engineering project. He attended the Tredyffrin-Easttown Middle School, Berwyn, Pennsylvania.	IAU · 34388
34391 Garyzhan	2000 RX_{67}	Gary Zhan (b. 2004) was a finalist in the 2018 Broadcom MASTERS, a math and science competition for middle-school students, for his microbiology and biochemistry project. He attended the Bear River Charter School, Logan, Utah.	IAU · 34391
34392 Afroz	2000 RT_{68}	Farhana Afroz mentored a finalist in the 2018 Broadcom MASTERS, a math and science competition for middle-school students. She teaches at the Granada Islamic School, Santa Clara, California.	IAU · 34392
34393 Cindyallen	2000 RL_{69}	Cindy Allen mentored a finalist in the 2018 Broadcom MASTERS, a math and science competition for middle-school students. She teaches at the Chapel Hill Middle School, Douglasville, Georgia.	IAU · 34393
34397 Rosaliebarber	2000 RJ_{76}	Rosalie Barber mentored a finalist in the 2018 Broadcom MASTERS, a math and science competition for middle-school students. She teaches at the Saint Matthew Catholic School, San Antonio, Texas.	IAU · 34397
34398 Terryschmidt	2000 RK_{78}	Terry Eugene Schmidt, American meteoriticist	JPL · 34398
34399 Hachiojihigashi	2000 RD_{79}	The team of Hachiojihigashi, composed of Nishi, Sakurai and Tamai from the Hachioji-higashi High School, is a prizewinner in the sixteenth Satellite Design Contest 2008 for their space experiment proposal	JPL · 34399
34400 Kimbaxter	2000 RC_{81}	Kim Baxter mentored a finalist in the 2018 Broadcom MASTERS, a math and science competition for middle-school students. She teaches at the Abraham Lincoln Middle School, Gainesville, Florida.	IAU · 34400

== 34401–34500 ==
back to top

Named minor planet	Provisional	This minor planet was named for...	Ref · Catalog
34401 Kaibeecher	2000 RS_{83}	Kaitlin Beecher mentored a finalist in the 2018 Broadcom MASTERS, a math and science competition for middle-school students. She teaches at the Bear River Charter School, Logan, Utah.	IAU · 34401
34402 Seamusanderson	2000 RW_{84}	Seamus Anderson (b. 1994), an American planetary scientist.	IAU · 34402
34403 Sessin	2000 RP_{85}	Wagner Sessin (1946–1997), a Brazilian dynamicist at the Instituto Tecnológico de Aeronáutica, Brazil.	IAU · 34403
34404 Jaybuddi	2000 RZ_{85}	Jay Buddi mentored a finalist in the 2018 Broadcom MASTERS, a math and science competition for middle-school students. He teaches at the Surfside Middle School, Panama City Beach, Florida.	IAU · 34404
34405 Caitlinshearer	2000 RU_{86}	Caitlin Shearer (b. 1993), an American engineer.	IAU · 34405
34406 Kristenconn	2000 RD_{92}	Kristen Connelly mentored a finalist in the 2018 Broadcom MASTERS, a math and science competition for middle-school students. She teaches at the Tredyffrin-Easttown Middle School, Berwyn, Pennsylvania.	IAU · 34406
34408 Simonanghel	2000 RX_{94}	Simon Anghel (b. 1988), a Romanian astronomer.	IAU · 34408
34409 Venturini	2000 RB_{95}	Julia Venturini (b. 1988), an Uruguayan astrophysicist.	IAU · 34409
34412 Tamicruz	2000 RG_{100}	Tami Cruz mentored a finalist in the 2018 Broadcom MASTERS, a math and science competition for middle-school students. She teaches at the Grand Avenue Middle School, Bellmore, New York.	IAU · 34412
34414 MacLennan	2000 RQ_{103}	Eric MacLennan (born 1990) is a postdoctoral researcher in the Physics Department at the University of Helsinki. He studies the production, physical and chemical evolution, and mobilization of regolith using telescopic reflectance spectroscopy and thermal analysis.	IAU · 34414
34415 Racheldragos	2000 RV_{103}	Rachel Dragos mentored a finalist in the 2018 Broadcom MASTERS, a math and science competition for middle-school students. She teaches at the Nueva School, Hillsborough, California.	IAU · 34415
34418 Juliegodfrey	2000 SO_{3}	Julie Godfrey mentored a finalist in the 2018 Broadcom MASTERS, a math and science competition for middle-school students. She teaches at the Northwestern Middle School, Milton, Georgia.	IAU · 34418
34419 Corning	2000 SA_{7}	Corning, New York, home of a glassworks that makes professional telescope mirrors, including the disk for the 5-m Hale Telescope at Palomar; the one-tenth-scale engineering model of that telescope still resides there, and was used to discover this minor planet	JPL · 34419
34420 Peterpau	2000 SC_{7}	Peter Pau, Hong Kong-born cinematographer	JPL · 34420
34424 Utashima	2000 SA_{21}	Masayoshi Utashima (born 1951), a researcher in the field of orbital mechanics in Japan Aerospace Exploration Agency.	JPL · 34424
34432 Groebe	2000 SF_{36}	Rebecca Groebe mentored a finalist in the 2018 Broadcom MASTERS, a math and science competition for middle-school students. She teaches at the Delta Woods Middle School, Lee's Summit, Missouri.	IAU · 34432
34433 Kavars	2000 SE_{37}	Michelle Kavars mentored a finalist in the 2018 Broadcom MASTERS, a math and science competition for middle-school students. She teaches at the Lewis Central Middle School, Council Bluffs, Iowa.	IAU · 34433
34441 Thomaslee	2000 SZ_{60}	Thomas Lee mentored a finalist in the 2018 Broadcom MASTERS, a math and science competition for middle-school students. He teaches at the Altamont Elementary School, Mountain House, California.	IAU · 34441
34443 Markmadland	2000 ST_{70}	Mark Madland mentored a finalist in the 2018 Broadcom MASTERS, a math and science competition for middle-school students. He teaches at the Leslie Middle School, Salem, Oregon.	IAU · 34443
34444 Kellmcallister	2000 SW_{73}	Kelly McAllister mentored a finalist in the 2018 Broadcom MASTERS, a math and science competition for middle-school students. She teaches at the Riverside Virtual School, Riverside, California.	IAU · 34444
34446 Karenmccoy	2000 SN_{74}	Karen McCoy mentored a finalist in the 2018 Broadcom MASTERS, a math and science competition for middle-school students. She teaches at the Meyzeek Middle School, Louisville, Kentucky.	IAU · 34446
34447 Mesidor	2000 SU_{74}	Philisha Mesidor mentored a finalist in the 2018 Broadcom MASTERS, a math and science competition for middle-school students. She teaches at the Saint Rose of Lima Catholic School, Miami Shores, Florida.	IAU · 34447
34450 Zashamickey	2000 SZ_{80}	Zasha Mickey mentored a finalist in the 2018 Broadcom MASTERS, a math and science competition for middle-school students. She teaches at the Lake Highland Preparatory School, Orlando, Florida.	IAU · 34450
34451 Rebohearn	2000 SY_{82}	Rebecca O'Hearn mentored a finalist in the 2018 Broadcom MASTERS, a math and science competition for middle-school students. She teaches at the Andover School of Montessori, Andover, Massachusetts.	IAU · 34451
34452 Jenniparker	2000 SS_{83}	Jennifer Parker mentored a finalist in the 2018 Broadcom MASTERS, a math and science competition for middle-school students. She teaches at the Woodside Elementary School, Woodside, California.	IAU · 34452
34453 Elisapeters	2000 SG_{84}	Elisa Peters mentored a finalist in the 2018 Broadcom MASTERS, a math and science competition for middle-school students. She teaches at the Terman Middle School, Palo Alto, California.	IAU · 34453
34456 Lydiareznik	2000 SG_{88}	Lydia Reznik mentored a finalist in the 2018 Broadcom MASTERS, a math and science competition for middle-school students. She teaches at the BASIS Scottsdale, Scottsdale, Arizona.	IAU · 34456
34457 Leahroberts	2000 SW_{88}	Leah Roberts mentored a finalist in the 2018 Broadcom MASTERS, a math and science competition for middle-school students. She teaches at the Westminster Schools, Atlanta, Georgia.	IAU · 34457
34462 Stoffregen	2000 SD_{95}	Nate Stoffregen mentored a finalist in the 2018 Broadcom MASTERS, a math and science competition for middle-school students. He teaches at the Quest Academy, Palatine, Illinois.	IAU · 34462
34465 Swaminathan	2000 SD_{102}	Raji Swaminathan mentored a finalist in the 2018 Broadcom MASTERS, a math and science competition for middle-school students. She teaches at the Harker School, San Jose, California.	IAU · 34465
34466 Ognicholls	2000 SN_{105}	Oliver Grant Nicholls (b. 1999) was awarded best of category and first place in the 2018 Intel ISEF for his robotics and intelligent machines project. He also received the Gordon E. Moore Award. He attended the Barker College, Sydney, NSW, Australia.	IAU · 34466
34467 Raphotter	2000 SC_{108}	Raphael Hotter (b. 1999) was awarded second place in the 2018 Intel International Science and Engineering Fair for his physics and astronomy project. He attended the Marianopolis College, Westmount, Quebec, Canada.	IAU · 34467
34469 Danishmahmood	2000 SM_{110}	Danish Mahmood (b. 2003) was awarded second place in the 2018 Intel International Science and Engineering Fair for his biomedical engineering project. He attended the London Central Secondary School, London, Ontario, Canada.	IAU · 34469
34470 Chouruihua	2000 SV_{113}	Chou Ruihua (b. 2001) was awarded best of category and first place in the 2018 Intel International Science and Engineering Fair for her systems software project. She attended the High School Affiliated to Renmin University of China, Beijing, China.	IAU · 34470
34471 Fanyueyang	2000 SE_{115}	Fan Yueyang (b. 2001) was awarded best of category and first place in the 2018 Intel International Science and Engineering Fair for his plant sciences project. He attended the No. 2 High School of East China Normal University, Shanghai, China.	IAU · 34471
34472 Guxieran	2000 ST_{115}	Gu Xieran (b. 2000) was awarded second place in the 2018 Intel International Science and Engineering Fair for her animal sciences team project. She attended the Shanghai Foreign Language School, Shanghai, China.	IAU · 34472
34473 Linkairui	2000 SC_{116}	Lin Kairui (b. 2000) was awarded second place in the 2018 Intel International Science and Engineering Fair for his energy project. He attended the QuanZhou No. 5 High School, Quanzhou, Fujian, China.	IAU · 34473
34474 Zhangjingru	2000 SJ_{116}	Zhang Jingru (b. 2000) was awarded second place in the 2018 Intel International Science and Engineering Fair for her animal sciences team project. She attended the High School Affiliated to Fudan University, Shanghai, China.	IAU · 34474
34475 Zhangyuhui	2000 SC_{118}	Zhang Yuhui (b. 2001) was awarded second place in the 2018 Intel International Science and Engineering Fair for his animal sciences team project. He attended the High School Affiliated to Shanghai Jiao Tong University, Shanghai, China.	IAU · 34475
34477 Muntz	2000 SJ_{120}	Benjamin Muntz (b. 1998) was awarded second place in the 2018 Intel International Science and Engineering Fair for his physics and astronomy project. He attended the H.C. Orsted Gymnasiet i Lyngby, Bronshoj, Denmark.	IAU · 34477
34478 Jonasboukamp	2000 SR_{120}	Jonas Boukamp (b. 1999) was awarded second place in the 2018 Intel International Science and Engineering Fair for his plant sciences team project. He attended the Berufskolleg Rheine, Rheine, Germany.	IAU · 34478
34479 Dunschen	2000 ST_{120}	Frederik Dunschen (b. 1998) was awarded best of category and first place in the 2018 Intel International Science and Engineering Fair for his engineering mechanics project. He attended the Friedensschule Munster, Munster, Germany	IAU · 34479
34482 Jessikirchner	2000 SX_{122}	Jessica Kirchner (b. 1999) was awarded second place in the 2018 Intel International Science and Engineering Fair for her plant sciences team project. She attended the Berufskolleg Rheine, Rheine, Germany	IAU · 34482
34484 Kubetzko	2000 SR_{124}	Tim Noah Kubetzko (b. 2000) was awarded second place in the 2018 Intel International Science and Engineering Fair for his physics and astronomy team project. He attended the Hans Thoma Gymnasium, Lorrach, Germany.	IAU · 34484
34485 Nullmeier	2000 SF_{128}	Lukas Nullmeier (b. 1998) was awarded second place in the 2018 Intel International Science and Engineering Fair for his embedded systems project. He attended the Salier-Gymnasium, Waiblingen, Germany.	IAU · 34485
34488 Lennartresch	2000 SO_{135}	Lennart Nikolai Resch (b. 2000) was awarded second place in the 2018 Intel International Science and Engineering Fair for his physics and astronomy team project. He attended the Hans Thoma Gymnasium, Lorrach, Germany.	IAU · 34488
34490 Danielkang	2000 SO_{137}	Daniel Zion Kang (b. 2002) was awarded best of category and first place in the 2018 Intel ISEF\ for his materials science project. He also received the European Union Contest for Young Scientists Award. He attended the John F. Kennedy High School, Tamuning, Guam.	IAU · 34490
34491 Mohammedsuhail	2000 SB_{138}	Mohammed Suhail Chinya Salimpasha (b. 2001) was awarded second place in the 2018 Intel International Science and Engineering Fair for his translational medical science team project. He attended the St. Aloysius Pre-University College, Mangalore, Karnataka, India.	IAU · 34491
34492 Swasthikpadma	2000 SP_{139}	Swasthik Padma (b. 2001) was awarded second place in the 2018 Intel International Science and Engineering Fair for his translational medical science team project. He attended the Vivekananda Pre University College, Dakshina Kannada, Karnataka, India.	IAU · 34492
34494 Shikarpur	2000 SE_{144}	Pranav Nadig Shikarpur (b. 2001) was awarded second place in the 2018 Intel International Science and Engineering Fair for his earth and environmental sciences team project. He attended the Bangalore International Academy, Bangalore, Karnataka, India.	IAU · 34494
34496 Viswanath	2000 SF_{147}	Siddharth Viswanath (b. 2001) was awarded second place in the 2018 Intel International Science and Engineering Fair for his earth and environmental sciences team project. He attended the Bangalore International Academy, Bangalore, Karnataka, India.	IAU · 34496
34497 Fionnferreira	2000 SJ_{147}	Fionn Miguel Eckardt Ferreira (b. 2000) was awarded second place in the 2018 Intel International Science and Engineering Fair for his chemistry project. He attended the Schull Community College, Schull, Cork, Ireland.	IAU · 34497
34498 Aaronhannon	2000 SF_{149}	Aaron Hannon (b. 1998) was awarded first place in the 2018 Intel International Science and Engineering Fair for his embedded systems project. He attended the St. Muredach's College, Connacht, Mayo, Ireland.	IAU · 34498
34499 Yusukesakai	2000 SL_{150}	Yusuke Sakai (b. 2000) was awarded second place in the 2018 Intel International Science and Engineering Fair for his animal sciences team project. He attended the Gifu Senior High School, Gifu, Japan.	IAU · 34499

== 34501–34600 ==
back to top

Named minor planet	Provisional	This minor planet was named for...	Ref · Catalog
34503 Tsuchida	2000 SJ_{157}	Kota Tsuchida, ISEF second place recipient in 2018	IAU · 34503
34504 Tsuzuku	2000 SJ_{158}	Yuka Tsuzuku, ISEF second place recipient in 2018	IAU · 34504
34509 Kuwehan	2000 SH_{175}	Atiya Kuwehan, ISEF second place recipient in 2018	IAU · 34509
34511 Aleenasaji	2000 SK_{175}	Aleena Saji, ISEF second place recipient in 2018	IAU · 34511
34522 Cadores	2000 SH_{192}	Keith Cadores, ISEF second place recipient in 2018	IAU · 34522
34523 Manzanero	2000 SU_{194}	Joscel Manzanero, ISEF second place recipient in 2018	IAU · 34523
34524 Eugenerivera	2000 SZ_{195}	Eugene Rivera, ISEF second place recipient in 2018	IAU · 34524
34525 Paszkowski	2000 SQ_{205}	Michal Paszkowski, ISEF second place recipient in 2018	IAU · 34525
34527 Fransanmartins	2000 SQ_{208}	Francisca Santos Martins, ISEF second place recipient in 2018	IAU · 34527
34534 Nogueira	2000 SL_{216}	Eduardo Nogueira, ISEF second place recipient in 2018	IAU · 34534
34539 Gabrielsilva	2000 SL_{223}	Gabriel Silva, ISEF second place recipient in 2018	IAU · 34539
34541 Gustavosanreyes	2000 SB_{228}	Gustavo Santiago-Reyes, ISEF second place recipient in 2018	IAU · 34541
34543 Davidbriggs	2000 SM_{229}	David L. Briggs, American director of the Massachusetts Institute of Technology's Lincoln Laboratory from 1998 to 2006	JPL · 34543
34544 Omarsanreyes	2000 SP_{233}	Omar Santiago-Reyes, ISEF second place recipient in 2018	IAU · 34544
34545 Chirita	2000 SB_{234}	Sandu Chirita, ISEF second place recipient in 2018	IAU · 34545
34551 Andrianova	2000 SJ_{242}	Anastasiia Andrianova, ISEF second place recipient in 2018	IAU · 34551
34552 Belousova	2000 SV_{242}	Irina Belousova, ISEF second place recipient in 2018	IAU · 34552
34555 Yuliamaslova	2000 SE_{262}	Yulia Maslova, ISEF second place recipient in 2018	IAU · 34555
34558 Annasavelyeva	2000 SM_{270}	Anna Savelyeva, ISEF second place recipient in 2018	IAU · 34558
34559 Aldossary	2000 SN_{272}	Faisal Aldossary, ISEF second place recipient in 2018	IAU · 34559
34567 Weidekoo	2000 SR_{297}	Wei De Koo, ISEF second place recipient in 2018	IAU · 34567
34569 Bryanlim	2000 ST_{306}	Bryan Wei Leong Lim, ISEF second place recipient in 2018	IAU · 34569
34570 Shawnlim	2000 SZ_{307}	Shawn Hai Leong Lim, ISEF second place recipient in 2018	IAU · 34570
34571 Dominicyap	2000 SA_{308}	Dominic Wei Ting Yap, ISEF second place recipient in 2018	IAU · 34571
34576 Leeshangjung	2000 SA_{329}	Lee Shang-Jung, ISEF second place recipient in 2018	IAU · 34576
34580 Yenpohsun	2000 SA_{343}	Yen Po-Hsun, ISEF second place recipient in 2018	IAU · 34580
34583 Dmitriivavilov	2000 SN_{351}	Dmitrii Vavilov (b. 1991), a Russian planetary scientist.	IAU · 34583
34584 Martintowner	2000 SX_{351}	Martin Towner (b. 1968), an Australian planetary scientist.	IAU · 34584
34585 Torrano	2000 SJ_{352}	Zachary A. Torrano (b. 1992), an American scientist.	IAU · 34585
34586 Filipemonteiro	2000 SK_{352}	Filipe Vieira Monteiro (b. 1989), a Brazilian planetary scientist.	IAU · 34586
34587 Vieiraneto	2000 SA_{357}	Ernesto Vieira Neto (b. 1965), a Brazilian professor at Universidad Estadual de São Paulo.	IAU · 34587
34589 Sarahadamo	2000 TO_{2}	Sarah Elizabeth Adamo (b. 2000) was awarded first place in the 2018 Intel International Science and Engineering Fair for her animal sciences project. She attended the Smithtown High School West, Smithtown, New York, U.S.A.	IAU · 34589
34591 Saadhahmed	2000 TB_{15}	Saadh Ahmed (b. 2000) was awarded second place in the 2018 Intel International Science and Engineering Fair for his translational medical science project. He attended the Northview High School, Johns Creek, Georgia, U.S.A.	IAU · 34591
34592 Amirtharaj	2000 TM_{17}	Divya Amirtharaj (b. 2001) was awarded first place in the 2018 Intel International Science and Engineering Fair for her systems software project. She attended the Westview High School, Portland, Oregon, U.S.A.	IAU · 34592
34594 Rohanarora	2000 TP_{24}	Rohan Arora (b. 2000) was awarded second place in the 2018 Intel International Science and Engineering Fair for his embedded systems team project. He attended the American High School, Fremont, California, U.S.A.	IAU · 34594
34597 Sondy	2000 TO_{36}	Alessondra “Sondy” Springmann (b. 1985), an American planetary scientist.	IAU · 34597
34599 Burzinbalsara	2000 TV_{39}	Burzin Poras Balsara (b. 1999) was awarded best of category and first place in the 2018 Intel International Science and Engineering Fair for his embedded systems team project. He attended the Plano Senior High School, Plano, Texas, U.S.A.	IAU · 34599

== 34601–34700 ==
back to top

Named minor planet	Provisional	This minor planet was named for...	Ref · Catalog
34604 Vilhena	2000 TW_{60}	Rodolpho Vilhena de Moraes (b. 1940), a Brazilian senior researcher	IAU · 34604
34611 Nacogdoches	2000 UF_{11}	Nacogdoches, Texas an Indian settlement, named for the Nacogdoche Indians. This minor planet was discovered at the Stephen F. Austin State University Observatory, located just outside of the city,	JPL · 34611
34616 Andrewbennett	2000 UO_{38}	Andrew Bennett (b. 2000) was awarded second place in the 2018 Intel International Science and Engineering Fair for his engineering mechanics project. He attended the Bountiful High School, Bountiful, Utah, U.S.A.	IAU · 34616
34619 Swagat	2000 UX_{53}	Swagat Bhattacharyya (b. 2000) was awarded second place in the 2018 Intel International Science and Engineering Fair for his embedded systems project. He attended the Morgantown High School, Morgantown, West Virginia, U.S.A.	IAU · 34619
34620 Edwinbodoni	2000 UX_{54}	Edwin Christopher Bodoni (b. 2000) was awarded best of category and first place in the 2018 Intel International Science and Engineering Fair for his translational medical science project. He attended the Cherry Creek High School, Greenwood Village, Colorado, U.S.A.	IAU · 34620
34625 Bollimpalli	2000 UT_{68}	Meghana Chowdary Bollimpalli (b. 2001) was awarded best of category and first place in the 2018 Intel ISEF for her chemistry project. She also received the Intel Foundation Young Scientist Award. She attended the Little Rock Central High School, Little Rock, Arkansas, U.S.A.	IAU · 34625
34628 Samaboyea	2000 UA_{99}	Samantha Boyea (b. 2000) was awarded second place in the 2018 Intel International Science and Engineering Fair for her robotics and intelligent machines project. She attended the Greenwich Junior-Senior High School, Greenwich, New York, U.S.A.	IAU · 34628
34632 Sarahbroas	2000 UY_{109}	Sarah Mae Broas (b. 2001) was awarded second place in the 2018 Intel International Science and Engineering Fair for her biomedical engineering project. She attended the Putnam Valley High School, Putnam Valley, New York, U.S.A.	IAU · 34632
34633 Megancantwell	2000 VN_{11}	Megan Cantwell (b. 2001) was awarded second place in the 2018 Intel International Science and Engineering Fair for her behavioral and social sciences project. She attended the Veritas Academy, Austin, Texas, U.S.A.	IAU · 34633
34634 Anjalichadha	2000 VQ_{17}	Anjali R. Chadha (b. 2002) was awarded second place in the 2018 Intel International Science and Engineering Fair for her environmental engineering project. She attended the duPont Manual High School, Louisville, Kentucky, U.S.A.	IAU · 34634
34636 Lauwingkai	2000 VC_{39}	Lau Wing Kai (1965–2003) was a nurse at Tuen Mun Hospital in Hong Kong. During the 2003 SARS epidemic, he selflessly carried out his duty and unfortunately died from the disease.	JPL · 34636
34644 Yatinchandar	2000 WX_{13}	Yatin J. Chandar (b. 2001) was awarded second place in the 2018 Intel International Science and Engineering Fair for his environmental engineering project. He attended the Davidson Academy of Nevada, Reno, Nevada, U.S.A.	IAU · 34644
34645 Vieiramartins	2000 WT_{67}	Roberto Vieira Martins (born 1947) is a Senior Researcher at the National Observatory of Brazil. He works on theoretical and observational activities in dynamics, as well as astrometry of small solar system bodies and their physical characterization through stellar occultations.	IAU · 34645
34646 Niaclements	2000 WT_{95}	Nia Myfanwy Clements (b. 2000) was awarded first place in the 2018 Intel International Science and Engineering Fair for her biomedical and health sciences project. She attended the Keystone School, San Antonio, Texas, U.S.A.	IAU · 34646
34647 Ankushdhawan	2000 WV_{97}	Ankush Kundan Dhawan (b. 2001) was awarded second place in the 2018 Intel International Science and Engineering Fair for his environmental engineering project. He attended the Signature School, Evansville, Indiana, U.S.A.	IAU · 34647
34650 Dunkenberger	2000 WK_{108}	Logan Dunkenberger (b. 2001) was awarded best of category and first place in the 2018 Intel International Science and Engineering Fair for her microbiology project. She attended the Roanoke Valley Governor's School for Science and Technology, Roanoke, Virginia, U.S.A.	IAU · 34650
34651 Edamadaka	2000 WQ_{114}	Sathya Edamadaka (b. 2001) was awarded best of category and first place in the 2018 Intel International Science and Engineering Fair for his energy project. He attended the High Technology High School, Lincroft, New Jersey, U.S.A.	IAU · 34651
34652 Simoneevans	2000 WN_{136}	Simone Alma Evans (b. 2000) was awarded second place in the 2018 Intel International Science and Engineering Fair for her plant sciences project. She attended the South River High School, Edgewater, Maryland, U.S.A.	IAU · 34652
34659 Damyasouami	2000 WS_{159}	Damya Souami (b. 1984), a French researcher.	IAU · 34659
34660 Mickeyvillarreal	2000 WB_{162}	Michaela Villarreal (b. 1989), an American planetary scientist	IAU · 34660
34665 Akbarwhizin	2000 WW_{184}	Akbar D. Whizin (b. 1983), an American scientist.	IAU · 34665
34666 Bohyunsan	2000 XA_{14}	Mount Bohyunsan, South Korea, where the discovery site, the Bohyunsan Optical Astronomy Observatory, is located	JPL · 34666
34675 Feldbush	2000 YR_{115}	Anna C. Feldbush (b. 1999) was awarded second place in the 2018 Intel International Science and Engineering Fair for her materials science project. She attended the West Shore Junior/Senior High School, Melbourne, Florida, U.S.A.	IAU · 34675
34677 Hunterwilliams	2000 YB_{135}	Hunter Williams (b. 1987), an American engineer and Technology Development Manager at Honeybee Robotics (Altadena, California).	IAU · 34677
34678 Hansenestruch	2001 AB_{29}	Philippe Ingemann Hansen-Estruch (b. 2000) was awarded second place in the 2018 Intel International Science and Engineering Fair for his biomedical and health sciences project. He attended the Canyon Crest Academy, San Diego, California, U.S.A.	IAU · 34678
34680 Anahumphrey	2001 BR_{21}	Ana Luisa Tio Humphrey (b. 2000) was awarded best of category and first place in the 2018 Intel International Science and Engineering Fair for her physics and astronomy project. She attended the T. C. Williams High School, Alexandria, Virginia, U.S.A.	IAU · 34680
34681 Suhahussain	2001 BB_{22}	Suha Hussain (b. 2002) was awarded second place in the 2018 Intel International Science and Engineering Fair for her systems software project. She attended the Queens High School for the Sciences at York College, Jamaica, New York, U.S.A.	IAU · 34681
34687 Isahaku	2001 FU_{74}	Ayman Napsy Isahaku (b. 1999) was awarded best of category and first place in the 2018 Intel ISEF for his animal sciences team project. He also received the Indo-U.S. Science & Technology Visit to India Award. He attended the Nicolet High School, Glendale, Wisconsin, U.S.A.	IAU · 34687
34689 Flewelling	2001 FY_{147}	Heather Flewelling (born 1979) is an ATLAS Planetary Defense Researcher at the University of Hawai'i (Manoa). Her work includes development of robotic telescopes and data pipelines, studying transient objects, and outreach activities.	IAU · 34689
34696 Risoldi	2001 OV_{12}	Vairo Risoldi, Italian amateur astronomer	JPL · 34696

== 34701–34800 ==
back to top

Named minor planet	Provisional	This minor planet was named for...	Ref · Catalog
34703 Wozniakiewicz	2001 OZ_{67}	Penelope Wozniakiewicz (b. 1983), a British space scientist.	IAU · 34703
34708 Grasset	2001 OG_{95}	Olivier Grasset (born 1968), a planetary scientist and professor at the University of Nantes' Laboratory of Planetology and Geodynamics.	JPL · 34708
34712 Zexixing	2001 ON_{103}	Zexi Xing (b. 1995), a Chinese astronomer.	IAU · 34712
34713 Yeşiltaş	2001 OO_{103}	Mehmet Yesiltas (b. 1984) is a Turkish scientist.	IAU · 34713
34714 Haozhang	2001 OB_{105}	Hao Zhang (b. 1970), a Chinese professor at China University of Geosciences (Wuhan, China).	IAU · 34714
34716 Guzzo	2001 PC_{14}	Massimiliano Guzzo (born 1970), Italian researcher at the University of Padua, member of the board of directors of the SIMCA (Società Italiana di Meccanica Celeste e Astrodinamica, Italian Society of Celestial Mechanics and Astrodynamics)	JPL · 34716
34717 Mirkovilli	2001 PD_{14}	Mirko Villi (born 1961), Italian amateur astronomer, supernova hunter, and founder of the International Supernovae Network	JPL · 34717
34718 Cantagalli	2001 PR_{28}	Michela Cantagalli (born 1965), daughter-in-law of Italian co-discoverer Luciano Tesi	JPL · 34718
34729 Natalianoel	2001 QJ_{42}	Natalia Noel Jacobson (b. 1999) was awarded second place in the 2018 Intel International Science and Engineering Fair for her animal sciences project. She attended the Empire High School, Tucson, Arizona, U.S.A.	IAU · 34729
34730 Rainajain	2001 QO_{45}	Raina Jain (b. 2002) was awarded best of category and first place in the 2018 Intel International Science and Engineering Fair for her environmental engineering project. She attended the Greenwich High School, Greenwich, Connecticut, U.S.A.	IAU · 34730
34731 Ronitjain	2001 QU_{47}	Ronit Jain (b. 2001) was awarded second place in the 2018 Intel International Science and Engineering Fair for his earth and environmental sciences project. He attended the Interlake High School, Bellevue, Washington, U.S.A.	IAU · 34731
34737 Parkerjou	2001 QC_{71}	Parker Jou (b. 2001) was awarded first place in the 2018 Intel International Science and Engineering Fair for his physics and astronomy project. He attended the Carmel High School, Carmel, Indiana, U.S.A.	IAU · 34737
34738 Hulbert	2001 QV_{71}	Sam Hulbert (1936–2016), American president of the Rose-Hulman Institute of Technology, host to the discovery site, the Oakley Observatory	JPL · 34738
34739 Maryalice	2001 QO_{75}	Mary Alice Fitzpatrick Jouve (b. 2001) was awarded second place in the 2018 Intel International Science and Engineering Fair for her physics and astronomy project. She attended the McGillToolen Catholic High School, Mobile, Alabama, U.S.A.	IAU · 34739
34740 Emmakeeler	2001 QJ_{77}	Emma Louise Keeler (b. 2001) was awarded second place in the 2018 Intel International Science and Engineering Fair for her microbiology project. She attended the Falmouth Academy, Falmouth, Massachusetts, U.S.A.	IAU · 34740
34741 Alyssakeirn	2001 QM_{77}	Alyssa Keirn (b. 2002) was awarded second place in the 2018 Intel International Science and Engineering Fair for her biomedical engineering project. She attended the Rocky Mountain High School, Fort Collins, Colorado, U.S.A.	IAU · 34741
34743 Kollipara	2001 QE_{80}	Veenadhari Kollipara (b. 2001) was awarded first place in the 2018 Intel International Science and Engineering Fair for her environmental engineering project. She attended the Interlake High School, Bellevue, Washington, U.S.A.	IAU · 34743
34746 Thoon	2001 QE_{91}	Thoon from Greek mythology. He was a Trojan warrior killed by Odysseus.	IAU · 34746
34752 Venkatkrishnan	2001 QU_{105}	Venkat Vinayak Krishnan (b. 2000) was awarded second place in the 2018 Intel International Science and Engineering Fair for his embedded systems team project. He attended the American High School, Fremont, California, U.S.A.	IAU · 34752
34753 Zdeněkmatyáš	2001 QU_{110}	Zdeněk Matyáš (1914–1956), Czech theoretical physicist	MPC · 34753
34760 Ciccone	2001 QR_{152}	Madonna (Madonna Louise Ciccone, born 1958) is an American singer, songwriter and actress. She frequently reinvented both her music and image and was named as "Queen of Pop" in the 1980s. Her musical CD Evita has accompanied the discoverer on numerous blinking nights.	IAU · 34760
34766 Everettkroll	2001 QP_{200}	Everett Adien Jeffrey Kroll (b. 2000) was awarded first place in the 2018 Intel International Science and Engineering Fair for his biomedical engineering project. He attended the Stillwater Area High School, Stillwater, Minnesota, U.S.A.	IAU · 34766
34769 Remilabeille	2001 QB_{236}	Remi Olivier Labeille (b. 2002) was awarded second place in the 2018 Intel International Science and Engineering Fair for his energy project. He attended the Midway High School, Waco, Texas, U.S.A.	IAU · 34769
34770 Leyendecker	2001 QJ_{243}	Peyton Maria Leyendecker (b. 2002) was awarded second place in the 2018 Intel International Science and Engineering Fair for her microbiology project. She attended the Skyview Academy, Highlands Ranch, Colorado, U.S.A.	IAU · 34770
34771 Lilauren	2001 QO_{252}	Lauren Hsing-Tze Li (b. 2001) was awarded second place in the 2018 Intel International Science and Engineering Fair for her cellular and molecular biology project. She attended the Westview High School, Portland, Oregon, U.S.A.	IAU · 34771
34772 Lirachel	2001 QU_{257}	Rachel Li (b. 2000) was awarded second place in the 2018 Intel International Science and Engineering Fair for her materials science team project. She attended the Spackenkill High School, Poughkeepsie, New York, U.S.A.	IAU · 34772
34775 Zinzi	2001 QL_{263}	Angelo Zinzi (b. 1979), an Italian scientist.	IAU · 34775
34778 Huhunglick	2001 RV_{6}	Henry Hu (Henry Hung-lick Hu; born 1920), Chinese barrister-at-law, co-founder of Shue Yan ("the cultivation of virtue") College, the first privately funded university in Hong Kong	JPL · 34778
34779 Chungchiyung	2001 RW_{11}	Chung Chi-yung (born 1920), wife of Henry Hu, co-founder of Shue Yan College, see (34778)	JPL · 34779
34780 Nikhillohe	2001 RB_{56}	Nikhil Lohe (b. 2000) was awarded second place in the 2018 Intel International Science and Engineering Fair for his microbiology project. He attended the Bergen County Academies, Hackensack, New Jersey, U.S.A.	IAU · 34780
34784 Lukelong	2001 RS_{77}	Luke M. Long (b. 2000) was awarded first place in the 2018 Intel International Science and Engineering Fair for his microbiology project. He attended the Canterbury School, Fort Myers, Florida, U.S.A.	IAU · 34784
34786 Odeh	2001 RS_{87}	Mohammad Shawkat Odeh (b. 1979) is the United Arab Emirates director of the International Astronomical Center in Abu Dhabi.	IAU · 34786
34788 Samuellossef	2001 RE_{114}	Samuel Brian Lossef (b. 2001) was awarded second place in the 2018 Intel International Science and Engineering Fair for his energy project. He attended the School Without Walls High School, Washington, District of Columbia, U.S.A.	IAU · 34788
34789 Brucemckean	2001 SC_{2}	Bruce McKean (born 1946), Canadian philanthropist who has supported mental health initiatives in Canada.	IAU · 34789
34791 Ericcraine	2001 SU_{4}	Eric Craine (born 1946) has been involved in astronomy for nearly 50 years and has published over one hundred research papers and five books. His work includes quantitative sky brightness measurements, stellar photometry and spectroscopy, astronomy education, and medical applications of astronomical imaging techniques.	JPL · 34791
34792 Hsiehcheching	2001 SE_{10}	Hsieh Che-ching (b. 1973) is a Taiwanese travel and art-history author. His book Banknotes Writing Romance won the Golden Ding Award for excellent publications. His book Starlit Ballad published in 2017 was the most poetic astronomy book ever read by the discoverer.	JPL · 34792
34796 Rheamalhotra	2001 SW_{35}	Rhea Malhotra (b. 2003) was awarded best of category and first place in the 2018 Intel ISEF for her biochemistry project. She also received the European Union Contest for Young Scientists Award. She attended the Moravian Academy, Bethlehem, Pennsylvania, U.S.A.	IAU · 34796
34797 Alicemartynova	2001 SK_{38}	Alice Martynova (b. 2001) was awarded second place in the 2018 Intel International Science and Engineering Fair for her biomedical and health sciences project. She attended the Los Gatos High School, Los Gatos, California, U.S.A.	IAU · 34797
34799 Mcdonaldboyer	2001 SQ_{48}	Ainsley McDonald-Boyer (b. 1999) was awarded second place in the 2018 Intel International Science and Engineering Fair for her behavioral and social sciences project. She attended the Azle High School, Azle, Texas, U.S.A.	IAU · 34799
34800 Evanmeade	2001 SD_{59}	Evan McKenna Meade (b. 1999) was awarded second place in the 2018 Intel International Science and Engineering Fair for his physics and astronomy project. He attended the Keystone School, San Antonio, Texas, U.S.A.	IAU · 34800

== 34801–34900 ==
back to top

Named minor planet	Provisional	This minor planet was named for...	Ref · Catalog
34802 Anwesha	2001 SP_{61}	Anwesha Mukherjee (b. 2003) was awarded second place in the 2018 Intel International Science and Engineering Fair for her robotics and intelligent machines project. She attended the Westview High School, Portland, Oregon, U.S.A.	IAU · 34802
34808 Bocosur	2001 SY_{73}	BOCOSUR (Bólidos del Cono Sur), the Uruguayan network of all-sky cameras for fireball detection.	IAU · 34808
34814 Muthukumar	2001 ST_{109}	Pragati Muthukumar (b. 2001) was awarded second place in the 2018 Intel International Science and Engineering Fair for her plant sciences project. She attended the Commack High School, Commack, New York, U.S.A.	IAU · 34814
34815 Wongfaye	2001 SQ_{113}	Faye Wong (Chinese: 王菲; pinyin: Wáng Fēi) (b. 1969), Chinese singer-songwriter and actress	IAU · 34815
34816 Billybarr	2001 ST_{113}	Billy Barr, American naturalist.	IAU · 34816
34817 Shiominemoto	2001 SE_{116}	Shiomi Nemoto (born 1965) is a volunteer for the Japan International Cooperation Agency. She works for the National Astronomical Observatory of Japan, and was the first secretary of the Japan Spaceguard Association.	JPL · 34817
34819 Nandininaidu	2001 SW_{119}	Nandini Tondamantham Naidu (b. 2000) was awarded second place in the 2018 Intel International Science and Engineering Fair for her biochemistry project. She attended the Valley Catholic High School, Beaverton, Oregon, U.S.A.	IAU · 34819
34821 Oyetunji	2001 SF_{129}	Ephraim Oyetunji (b. 2001) was awarded second place in the 2018 Intel International Science and Engineering Fair for his behavioral and social sciences project. He attended the American Heritage School, Plantation, Florida, U.S.A.	IAU · 34821
34822 Dhruvikparikh	2001 SO_{133}	Dhruvik Parikh (b. 2000) was awarded best of category and first place in the 2018 Intel International Science and Engineering Fair for his energy project. He also received the Intel Foundation Young Scientist Award. He attended the Henry M. Jackson High School, Bothell, Washington, U.S.A.	IAU · 34822
34823 Lillipetersen	2001 SM_{155}	Lillian Petersen (b. 2002) was awarded first place in the 2018 Intel International Science and Engineering Fair for her earth and environmental sciences project. She attended the Los Alamos High School, Los Alamos, New Mexico, U.S.A.	IAU · 34823
34828 Ishapuri	2001 SO_{168}	Isha Puri (b. 2001) was awarded second place in the 2018 Intel International Science and Engineering Fair for her computational biology and bioinformatics project. She attended the Horace Greeley High School, Chappaqua, New York, U.S.A.	IAU · 34828
34830 Annaquinlan	2001 SQ_{227}	Anna Quinlan (b. 2001) was awarded second place in the 2018 Intel International Science and Engineering Fair for her biomedical engineering project. She attended the Menlo-Atherton High School, Atherton, California, U.S.A.	IAU · 34830
34831 Krithikramesh	2001 SA_{234}	Krithik Ramesh (b. 2002) was awarded first place in the 2018 Intel International Science and Engineering Fair for his engineering mechanics project. He attended the Cherry Creek High School, Greenwood Village, Colorado, U.S.A.	IAU · 34831
34836 Ronakroy	2001 SE_{254}	Ronak Roy (b. 2001) was awarded best of category and first place in the 2018 Intel ISEF for his biomedical engineering project. He also received the Indo-U.S. Science & Technology Visit to India Award. He attended the Canyon Crest Academy, San Diego, California, U.S.A.	IAU · 34836
34837 Berilsaygin	2001 SD_{262}	Beril Lara Saygin (b. 2002) was awarded second place in the 2018 Intel International Science and Engineering Fair for her translational medical science project. She attended the Keystone School, San Antonio, Texas, U.S.A.	IAU · 34837
34838 Lazowski	2001 SK_{262}	Eugene Lazowski (1913–2006), a Polish medical doctor.	JPL · 34838
34840 Lawwaikuen	2001 SB_{268}	Lau Wai Kuen, Hong Kong actress.	IAU · 34840
34841 Ruthgottesman	2001 SE_{268}	Ruth Wolfe Gottesman, American educator and researcher	IAU · 34841
34844 Malavshah	2001 SG_{277}	Malav H. Shah (b. 2000) was awarded best of category and first place in the 2018 Intel International Science and Engineering Fair for his embedded systems team project. He attended the Plano Senior High School, Plano, Texas, U.S.A.	IAU · 34844
34846 Vincent	2001 SY_{281}	Jean-Baptiste Vincent (born 1983) is a Researcher at the DLR Institute of Planetary Research, Berlin, Germany. He is a planetary scientist studying the formation and evolution of asteroids and comets through their surface properties and activity from ground-based observations and space missions.	IAU · 34846
34852 Shteyman	2001 TS_{12}	Amy Rose Shteyman (b. 2000) was awarded best of category and first place in the 2018 Intel International Science and Engineering Fair for her behavioral and social sciences project. She attended the John L. Miller Great Neck North High School, Great Neck, New York, U.S.A.	IAU · 34852
34854 Paquifrutos	2001 TP_{17}	Paqui Frutos Frutos, wife of the discoverer.	JPL · 34854
34855 Annaspektor	2001 TT_{30}	Anna Spektor (b. 2001) was awarded best of category and first place in the 2018 Intel International Science and Engineering Fair for her animal sciences team project. She attended the Nicolet High School, Glendale, Wisconsin, U.S.A.	IAU · 34855
34856 Savithas	2001 TR_{32}	Savitha Srinivasan (b. 2002) was awarded second place in the 2018 Intel International Science and Engineering Fair for her robotics and intelligent machines project. She attended the Interlake High School, Bellevue, Washington, U.S.A.	IAU · 34856
34857 Sutaria	2001 TB_{36}	Jainil Sutaria (b. 2000) was awarded second place in the 2018 Intel International Science and Engineering Fair for his materials science team project. He attended the Ardsley High School, Ardsley, New York, U.S.A.	IAU · 34857
34859 Lamshanmuk	2001 TR_{49}	Lam Shan-Muk, better known by his pen name Lam Hang-chi, was a Hong Kong journalist, columnist, and founder of the Hong Kong Economic Journal.	IAU · 34859
34862 Utkarshtandon	2001 TX_{79}	Utkarsh Tandon (b. 2000) was awarded second place in the 2018 Intel International Science and Engineering Fair for his computational biology and bioinformatics project. He attended the Cupertino High School, Cupertino, California, U.S.A.	IAU · 34862
34863 Lientang	2001 TP_{107}	Lien Tang (b. 2000) was awarded second place in the 2018 Intel International Science and Engineering Fair for her biomedical and health sciences project. She attended the Manzano High School, Albuquerque, New Mexico, U.S.A.	IAU · 34863
34871 Howaiho	2001 UM_{2}	Ho Wai Ho, Hong Kong firefighter and former police officer.	IAU · 34871
34874 Tolwani	2001 UU_{9}	Anil Ravi Tolwani (b. 1999) was awarded second place in the 2018 Intel International Science and Engineering Fair for his embedded systems team project. He attended the American High School, Fremont, California, U.S.A.	IAU · 34874
34876 Sofiatomov	2001 UK_{32}	Sofia Tomov (b. 2003) was awarded first place in the 2018 Intel International Science and Engineering Fair for her translational medical science project. She attended the Homeschool, Knoxville, Tennessee, U.S.A.	IAU · 34876
34877 Tremsin	2001 UQ_{34}	Vasily Antonovich Tremsin (b. 1999) was awarded best of category and first place in the 2018 Intel International Science and Engineering Fair for his earth and environmental sciences project. He attended the Campolindo High School, Moraga, California, U.S.A.	IAU · 34877
34879 Tripathiishan	2001 UQ_{35}	Eeshan Tripathii (b. 2001) was awarded second place in the 2018 Intel International Science and Engineering Fair for his environmental engineering project. He attended the Dalton School, New York, New York, U.S.A.	IAU · 34879
34890 Vasikaran	2001 VS_{62}	Sangita Vasikaran (b. 2001) was awarded second place in the 2018 Intel International Science and Engineering Fair for her biochemistry project. She attended the Texas Academy of Mathematics and Science, Denton, Texas, U.S.A.	IAU · 34890
34891 Elizabethpaige	2001 VR_{66}	Elizabeth Paige Wamsley (b. 2001) was awarded second place in the 2018 Intel International Science and Engineering Fair for her animal sciences project. She attended the Timber Ridge Scholars Academy, Pacific, Missouri, U.S.A.	IAU · 34891
34892 Evapalisa	2001 VW_{88}	Eva Palisa, great-grandniece of Johann Palisa, the leading visual discoverer of minor planets	JPL · 34892
34893 Mihomasatoshi	2001 WM_{1}	Husband and wife Masatoshi Taga (born 1969) and Miho Taga (born 1969) worked for several years at the National Astronomical Observatory of Japan. Masatoshi engaged in the studies of galaxies and astronomical data archive systems. Miho designed the logo for the Japan Spaceguard Association.	JPL · 34893

== 34901–35000 ==
back to top

Named minor planet	Provisional	This minor planet was named for...	Ref · Catalog
34901 Mauna Loa	2699 P-L	Mauna Loa (means Long Mountain), the volcano forms the largest part of the Big Island of Hawaii	JPL · 34901
34919 Imelda	4710 P-L	Imelda Gentile, cousin of Heidelberg astronomer Joachim Schubart	JPL · 34919
34978 van 't Hoff	1901 T-3	Jacobus Henricus van 't Hoff (1852–1911), a Dutch physical chemist who was awarded the first Nobel Prize in Chemistry in 1901. The award was for his work showing that the laws describing the behavior of very dilute solutions resemble the laws describing the behavior of gases.	IAU · 34978
34993 Euaimon	1973 SR_{1}	Euaimon, mythological king of Atlantis, son of Poseidon and father of Eurypylos, one of the Greeks that sacked Troy	JPL · 34993
34995 Dainihonshi	1977 DP_{2}	The Dai Nihonshi is a historical record of Japan, comprising 397 volumes, covering the period from Emperor Jimmu (c. 650 BCE) to Emperor Go-Komatsu (1377–1433).	JPL · 34995
34996 Mitokoumon	1977 DH_{4}	Mitokoumon is a popular name of Mitsukuni Tokugara (1628–1701), a vice Shogun of the Tokugawa family and a lord of the Mito domain.	JPL · 34996

back to top

Preceded by 33,001–34,000	Meanings of minor-planet names List of minor planets: 34,001–35,000	Succeeded by 35,001–36,000
