= Jacobus Henricus van 't Hoff =

Dutch physical and organic chemist (1852–1911)

Jacobus Henricus van 't Hoff Jr.
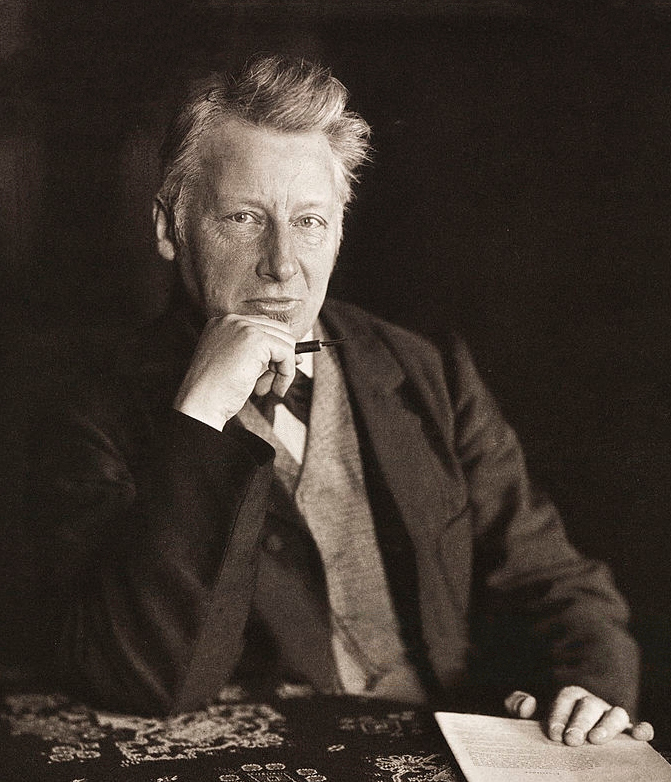
- Van 't Hoff in 1904
- Born: 30 August 1852; Rotterdam, Netherlands
- Died: 1 March 1911 (aged 58); Steglitz, Berlin, German Empire
- Education: Delft University of Technology; University of Leiden; University of Bonn; University of Paris; University of Utrecht
- Known for: One of the founders of stereochemistry and physical chemistry; Modern concept of chemical affinity; Predicting the structure of tetrahedral carbon atom (asymmetric carbon); Predicting the existence of chiral allenes; Stereoisomerism; Chemical thermodynamics; Chemical kinetics; Chemical equilibrium; Osmotic pressure; Van 't Hoff equation; Van 't Hoff factor; Le Bel–Van 't Hoff rule
- Awards: Davy Medal (1893); Pour le Mérite (1895); ForMemRS (1897); Nobel Prize for Chemistry (1901); Helmholtz Medal (1911)
- Scientific career
- Fields: Physical chemistry Organic chemistry Theoretical chemistry
- Workplaces: Veterinary College in Utrecht; University of Amsterdam; University of Berlin
- Doctoral advisor: Eduard Mulder
- Other academic advisors: August Kekulé
- Doctoral students: Ernst Cohen
- Other notable students: Frederick G. Donnan

Jacobus Henricus van 't Hoff Jr. (Dutch: [vɑn (ə)t ˈɦɔf]; 30 August 1852 – 1 March 1911) was a Dutch physical chemist. A highly influential theoretical chemist, in 1901 Van 't Hoff won the first Nobel Prize in Chemistry "[for his] discovery of the laws of chemical dynamics and osmotic pressure in solutions". His pioneering work helped found the modern theory of chemical affinity, chemical equilibrium, chemical kinetics, and chemical thermodynamics. In his 1874 pamphlet, Van 't Hoff formulated the theory of the tetrahedral carbon atom and laid the foundations of stereochemistry. In 1875, he predicted the correct structures of allenes and cumulenes as well as their axial chirality. He is also widely considered one of the three co-founders of physical chemistry as the discipline is known today. The Zeitschrift für physikalische Chemie (Journal of Physical Chemistry) was founded in 1887 by Van 't Hoff, Svante Arrhenius and Wilhelm Ostwald, at Leipzig University as the first dedicated scientific journal for the discipline.

== Biography ==
The third of seven children, Van 't Hoff was born in Rotterdam, Netherlands, 30 August 1852. His father was Jacobus Henricus van 't Hoff Sr., a physician, and his mother was Alida Kolff van 't Hoff. From a young age, he was interested in science and nature, and frequently took part in botanical excursions. In his early school years, he showed a strong interest in poetry and philosophy. He considered Lord Byron to be his idol.

Against the wishes of his father, Van 't Hoff chose to study chemistry. First, he enrolled at Delft University of Technology in September 1869, and studied until 1871, when he passed his final exam on 8 July and obtained a degree of chemical technologist. He passed all his courses in two years, although the time assigned to study was three years. Then he enrolled at University of Leiden to study chemistry. He then studied in Bonn, Germany, with August Kekulé and in Paris with Adolphe Wurtz. He received his doctorate under Eduard Mulder at the University of Utrecht in 1874.

In 1878, Van 't Hoff married Johanna Francina Mees. They had two daughters, Johanna Francina (1880–1964) and Aleida Jacoba (1882–1971), and two sons, Jacobus Henricus van 't Hoff III (1883–1943) and Govert Jacob (1889–1918). Van 't Hoff died at the age of 58, on 1 March 1911, at Steglitz, near Berlin, of tuberculosis.

== Career ==
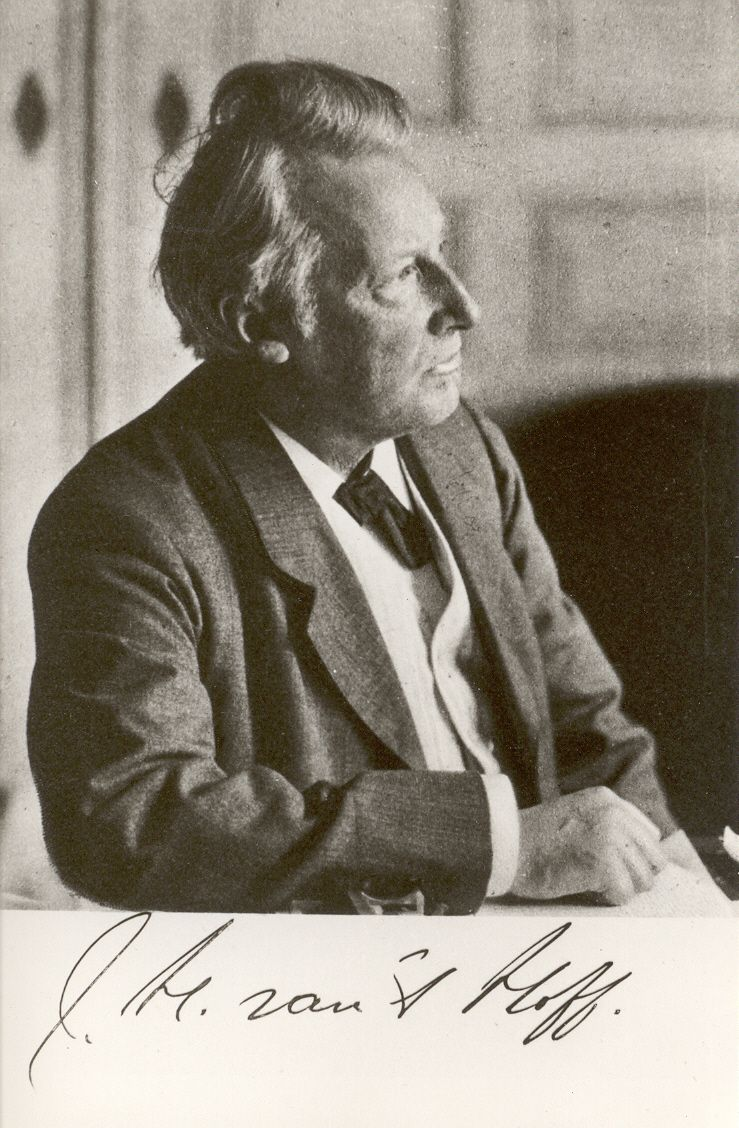
Van 't Hoff in the 1900s

=== Organic chemistry ===
Van 't Hoff earned his earliest reputation in the field of organic chemistry. In 1874, he accounted for the phenomenon of optical activity by assuming that the chemical bonds between carbon atoms and their neighbors were directed towards the corners of a regular tetrahedron. This three-dimensional structure accounted for the isomers found in nature. He shares credit for this with the French chemist Joseph Le Bel, who independently came up with the same idea.

Three months before his doctoral degree was awarded, Van 't Hoff published this theory, which today is regarded as the foundation of stereochemistry, first in a Dutch pamphlet in the fall of 1874, and then in the following May in a small French book entitled La chimie dans l'espace. A German translation appeared in 1877, at a time when the only job Van 't Hoff could find was at the Veterinary School in Utrecht. In these early years his theory was largely ignored by the scientific community, and was sharply criticized by one prominent chemist, Hermann Kolbe. Kolbe wrote:

"A Dr. J. H. van 't Hoff of the Veterinary School at Utrecht has no liking, apparently, for exact chemical investigation. He has considered it more convenient to mount Pegasus (apparently borrowed from the Veterinary School) and to proclaim in his ‘La chimie dans l’espace’ how, in his bold flight to the top of the chemical Parnassus, the atoms appeared to him to be arranged in cosmic space."

However, by about 1880, support for Van 't Hoff's theory by such important chemists as Johannes Wislicenus and Viktor Meyer brought recognition.

=== Physical chemistry ===
In 1884, Van 't Hoff published his research on chemical kinetics, titled Études de Dynamique chimique ("Studies in Chemical Dynamics"), in which he described a new method for determining the order of a reaction using graphics and applied the laws of thermodynamics to chemical equilibria. He also introduced the modern concept of chemical affinity. In 1886, he showed a similarity between the behaviour of dilute solutions and gases. In 1887, he and German chemist Wilhelm Ostwald founded an influential scientific magazine named Zeitschrift für physikalische Chemie ("Journal of Physical Chemistry"). He worked on Svante Arrhenius's theory of the dissociation of electrolytes and in 1889 provided physical justification for the Arrhenius equation. In 1896, he became a professor at the Prussian Academy of Sciences in Berlin. His studies of the salt deposits at Stassfurt were an important contribution to Prussia's chemical industry.

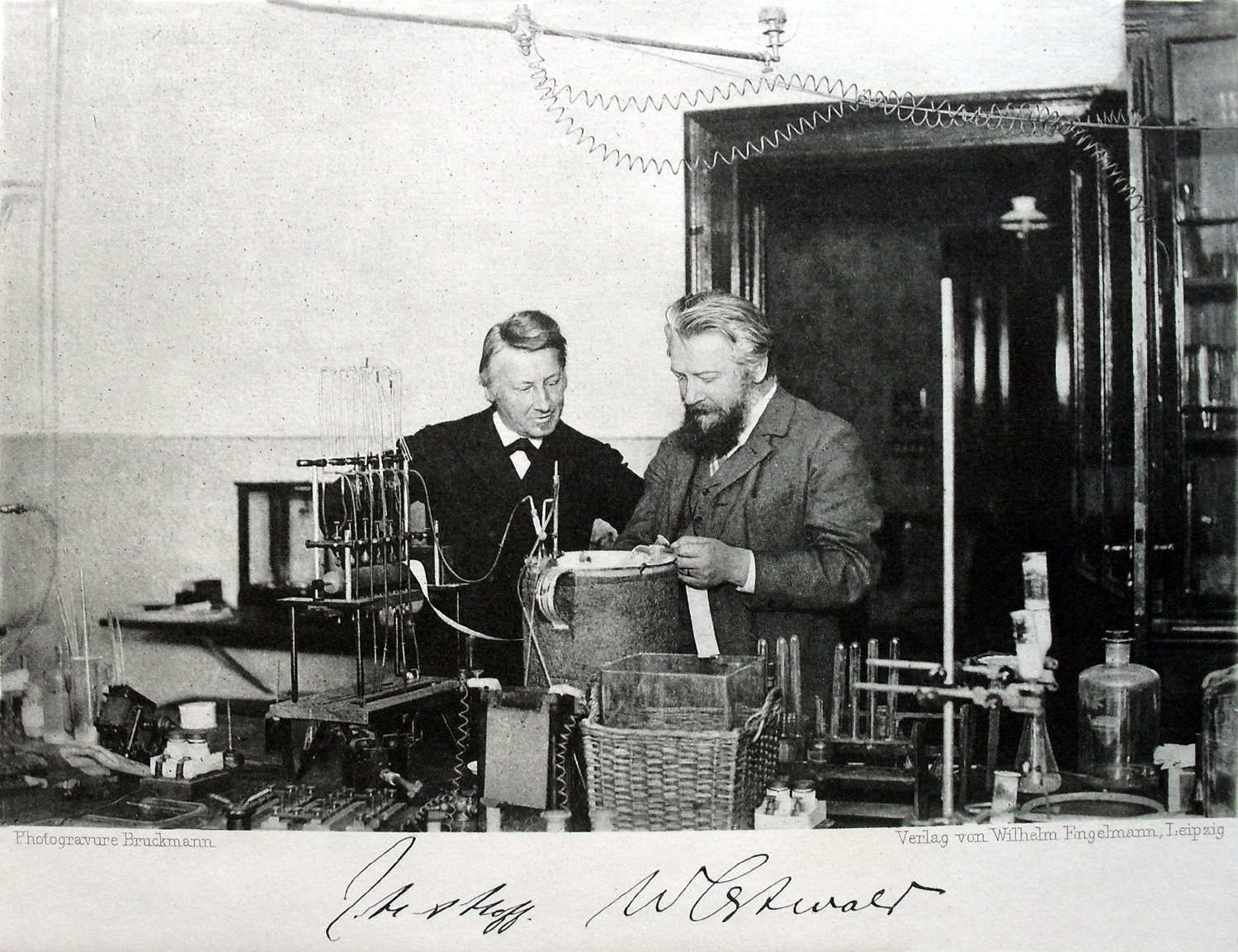
J.H. van 't Hoff with Wilhelm Ostwald (right)

Van 't Hoff became a lecturer in chemistry and physics at the Veterinary College in Utrecht. He then worked as a professor of chemistry, mineralogy, and geology at the University of Amsterdam for almost 18 years before eventually becoming the chairman of the chemistry department. In 1896, van 't Hoff moved to Germany, where he finished his career at the University of Berlin in 1911. In 1901, he received the first Nobel Prize in Chemistry for his work with solutions. His work showed that very dilute solutions follow mathematical laws that closely resemble the laws describing the behavior of gases.

== Honours and awards ==
In 1885, Van 't Hoff was appointed as a Member of the Royal Netherlands Academy of Arts and Sciences. He was elected to honorary membership of the Manchester Literary and Philosophical Society in1892. In 1904, he was elected as a member to the American Philosophical Society. Other distinctions include honorary doctorates from Harvard and Yale (1901), Victoria University, the University of Manchester (1903), and University of Heidelberg (1908). He was awarded the Davy Medal of the Royal Society in 1893 (along with Le Bel), and elected a Foreign Member of the Royal Society (ForMemRS) in 1897. He was awarded the Helmholtz Medal of the Prussian Academy of Sciences (1911), and appointed Knight of the French Legion of Honour (1894) and Senator in the Kaiser-Wilhelm-Gesellschaft (1911). Van 't Hoff became an Honorary Member of the British Chemical Society in London, the Royal Netherlands Academy of Arts and Sciences (1892), American Chemical Society (1898), the Académie des Sciences in Paris (1905), and the Netherlands Chemical Society (1908). Of his numerous distinctions, Van 't Hoff regarded winning the first Nobel Prize in Chemistry as the culmination of his career. The following are named after him:

- Van 't Hoff factor
- Van 't Hoff equation
- Le Bel–Van 't Hoff rule

On 14 May 2021, asteroid 34978 van 't Hoff, discovered by astronomers with the Palomar–Leiden survey in 1977, was named in his memory.

== Works ==
- Chimie dans l'espace (in German). Braunschweig: Vieweg und Sohn. 1894.
- Chemische Dynamik (in German). Braunschweig: Vieweg und Sohn. 1898.
- Chemische Statik (in German). Braunschweig: Vieweg und Sohn. 1899.
- Beziehungen zwischen Eigenschaften und Zusammensetzung (in German). Braunschweig: Vieweg und Sohn. 1900.
- Foundations of the theory of dilute solutions. Edinburgh: Alembic Club. 1929.

== See also ==
- Chemical crystallography before X-rays
