= 31641 Cevasco =

Stony main-belt asteroid

Discovery
- Discovered by: LINEAR
- Discovery site: Lincoln Lab's ETS
- Discovery date: 6 April 1999

Designations
- Named after: Hannah Olivia Cevasco (Broadcom MASTERS awardee)
- Alternative designations: 1999 GW_{34} · 1993 RR_{14}
- Minor planet category: main-belt · (inner); Nysa–Polana complex

Orbital characteristics
- Epoch 4 September 2017 (JD 2458000.5)
- Uncertainty parameter 0
- Observation arc: 23.42 yr (8,554 days)
- Aphelion: 2.7515 AU
- Perihelion: 2.1234 AU
- Semi-major axis: 2.4374 AU
- Eccentricity: 0.1289
- Orbital period (sidereal): 3.81 yr (1,390 days)
- Mean anomaly: 347.07°
- Inclination: 1.2136°
- Longitude of ascending node: 278.36°
- Argument of perihelion: 215.87°

Physical characteristics
- Dimensions: 2.737±0.168; 3.26 km (calculated)
- Synodic rotation period: 2.6556±0.1936 h 2.8167±0.0127 h 2.820±0.010 h
- Geometric albedo: 0.20 (assumed); 0.3108±0.0672; 0.311±0.067
- Spectral type: S
- Absolute magnitude (H): 14.8 · 14.940

31641 Cevasco (provisional designation 1999 GW_{34}) is a stony asteroid from the inner regions of the asteroid belt, approximately 3.3 kilometers in diameter. It was discovered on 6 April 1999, by the Lincoln Near-Earth Asteroid Research project at Lincoln Laboratory's Experimental Test Site in Socorro, New Mexico, United States. The asteroid was named for Hannah Cevasco, a 2015 Broadcom MASTERS awardee.

== Orbit and classification ==
Cevasco orbits the Sun in the inner main-belt at a distance of 2.1–2.8 AU once every 3 years and 10 months (1,390 days). Its orbit has an eccentricity of 0.13 and an inclination of 1° with respect to the ecliptic.

The asteroid's observation arc begins 6 years prior to its official discovery observation, with its first identification as 1993 RR_{14} at ESO's La Silla Observatory in 1993.

== Physical characteristics ==
=== Lightcurves ===
Three rotational lightcurves of Cevasco were obtained from photometric observations at the Palomar Transient Factory between 2010 and 2014. Lightcurve analysis gave a rotation period of 2.6556, 2.8167 and 2.820 hours with a brightness variation of 0.71, 0.48 and 0.54 magnitude, respectively (U=2/2/2).

=== Diameter and albedo ===
According to the survey carried out by NASA's Wide-field Infrared Survey Explorer with its subsequent NEOWISE mission, Cevasco measures 2.7 kilometers in diameter and its surface has an albedo of 0.311, while the Collaborative Asteroid Lightcurve Link assumes a standard albedo for a stony asteroid of 0.20 and calculates a diameter of 3.3 kilometers with an absolute magnitude of 14.8.

== Naming ==
This minor planet was named in honor of Hannah Olivia Cevasco (born 2000) finalist in the 2015 Broadcom MASTERS, a math and science competition for middle school students, for her medicine and health sciences project. At the time she attended the St. Charles School in California.
