= Jean Baptiste Gaspard Bochart de Saron =

French astronomer (1730–1794)

Jean-Baptiste-Gaspard Bochart de Saron (16 January 1730 – 20 April 1794) was a French magistrate in the Parlement of Paris and an amateur astronomer, chemist and mathematician who took an interest in the orbits of comets. He was executed by guillotine during the Reign of Terror.

De Saron was born in Paris in a wealthy and influential family who was taken care of by Elie Bochart, a Paris magistrate and Canon at Notre Dame, after the death of his father. He was educated at the Louis le Grand college and took an interest in geometry and mathematics rather than law as the family intended. He however studied law and became a magistrate at the Parlement of Paris. He rose in power and aside from his work he began to spend time on astronomy, obtaining the best instruments available. He became a member of the Royal Academy of Sciences in 1779. He worked with many French astronomers of the time, lending his instruments and collaborating with Charles Messier and J.D. Cassini. Messier observed what William Herschel had recorded in 1781 and had thought of as a comet. De Saron examined its path and decided that it had a more circular than parabolic orbit and that it was further than Saturn. This was later identified as the planet Uranus. When Messier was injured in an accident in November 1781, de Saron helped support him until he recovered. De Saron also took an interest in chemistry and constructed a furnace in which he was able to melt platinum at 1755 °C. In 1788 De Saron was made President of the Assembly following the death of Louis Lefèvre d'Ormesson. In November 1789 the Parlement was dissolved and De Saron became involved with the French Geodetic Survey.

== Death and legacy ==
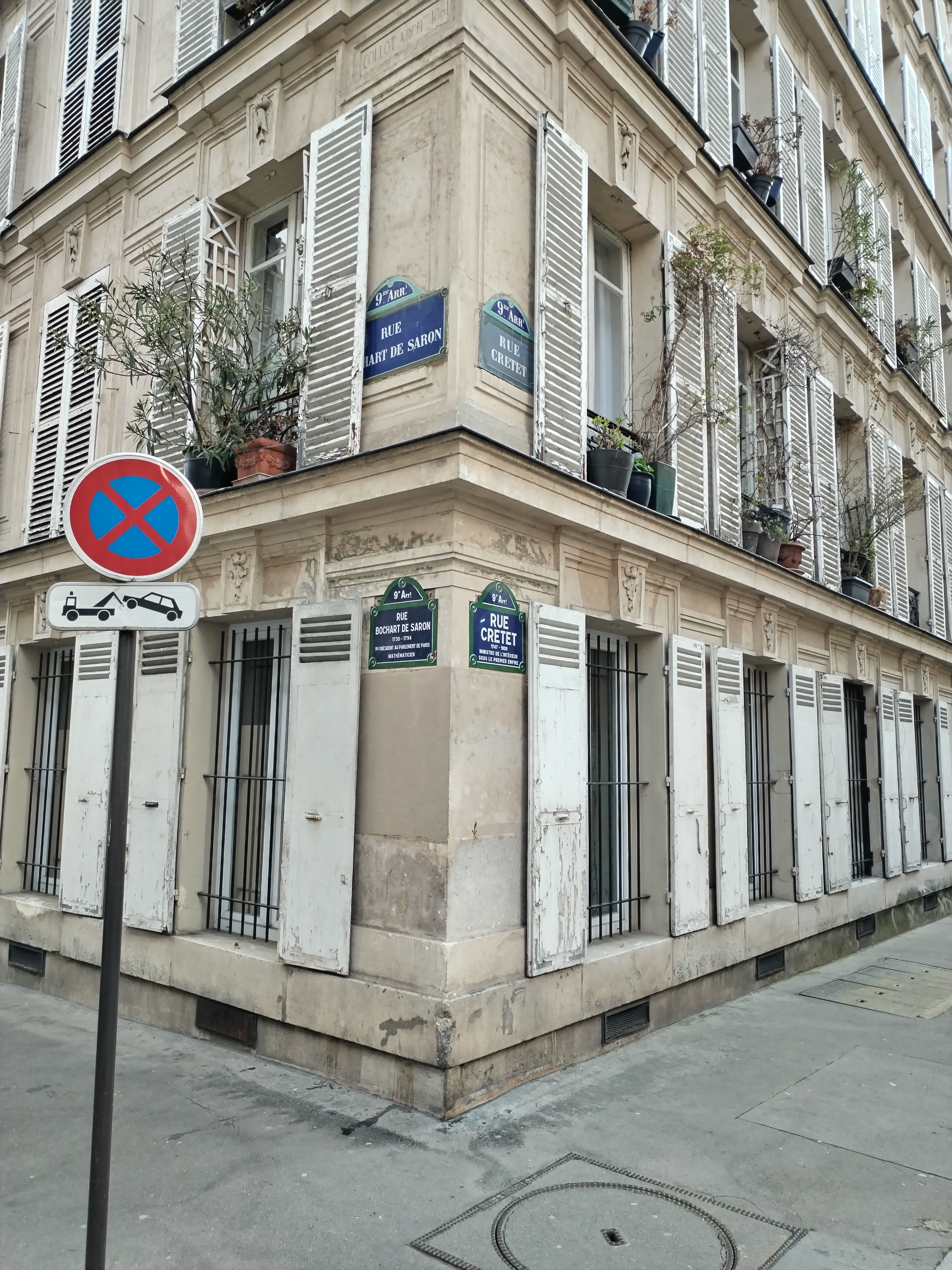
Rue Bochart de Saron, Paris

In 1793, following the assassination of Jean Paul Marat, on 10 November 1793 Jean Sylvain Bailly, another astronomer who had set himself as president of the interim National Assembly was tried and guillotined two days later. De Saron and other former Parlement members were then searched for and arrested on 18 December and he was guillotined on 20 April 1794.

Rue Bochart de Saron, a street in the 9th arrondissement of Paris, is named after him. On 14 May 2021, asteroid 35429 Bochartdesaron, discovered by astronomers at ODAS in 1998, was named in his memory.
