= List of fellows of the Royal Society elected in 1897 =

This article lists fellows of the Royal Society elected in 1897.

== Fellows ==
1. Robert Bell (1841–1917)
2. William Henry Broadbent (1835–1907)
3. Charles Chree (1860–1928)
4. Henry John Elwes (1846–1922)
5. John Scott Haldane (1860–1936)
6. William Aitcheson Haswell (1854–1925)
7. Thomas George Bond Howes (1853–1905)
8. Frederic Stanley Kipping (1863–1949)
9. George Ballard Mathews (1861–1922)
10. George Robert Milne Murray (1858–1911)
11. Francis Henry Neville (1847–1915)
12. Henry Alleyne Nicholson (1844–1899)
13. Wilhelm Friedrich Philipp Pfeffer (1845–1920)
14. John Millar Thomson (1849–1933)
15. Frederick Thomas Trouton (1863–1922)
16. Herbert Hall Turner (1861–1930)

== Foreign members ==
1. Emile Hilaire Amagat (1841–1915)
2. Ferdinand Julius Cohn (1828–1898)
3. Josiah Willard Gibbs (1839–1903)
4. Rudolph Peter Heinrich Heidenhain (1834–1897)
5. Jacobus Hendrik Van't Hoff (1852–1911) Nobel laureate
6. Heinrich Hermann Robert Koch (1843–1910)
7. Felix-Joseph Henri de Lacaze-Duthiers (1821–1901)
8. Johannes Wislicenus (1835–1902)
9. Ferdinand Zirkel (1838–1912)
