= Truett Latimer =

American politician

Member of the Texas House of Representatives
- In office January 13, 1953 – January 8, 1963

Personal details
- Born: August 23, 1928 (age 98) Lueders, Texas, U.S.
- Party: Democratic
- Education: Hardin-Simmons University
- Profession: insurance businessman

Roy Truett Latimer (born August 23, 1928) is an American politician. A member of the Democratic Party, he served in the Texas House of Representatives from 1953 to 1963. Latimer also served as the president of the Houston Museum of Natural Science. Asteroid 35403 Latimer was named in his honor.

He was inducted into Hardin Simmons University's Hall of Fame.
