= Tokyo Future University =

Coordinates: 35°44′36.2″N 139°49′0.9″E

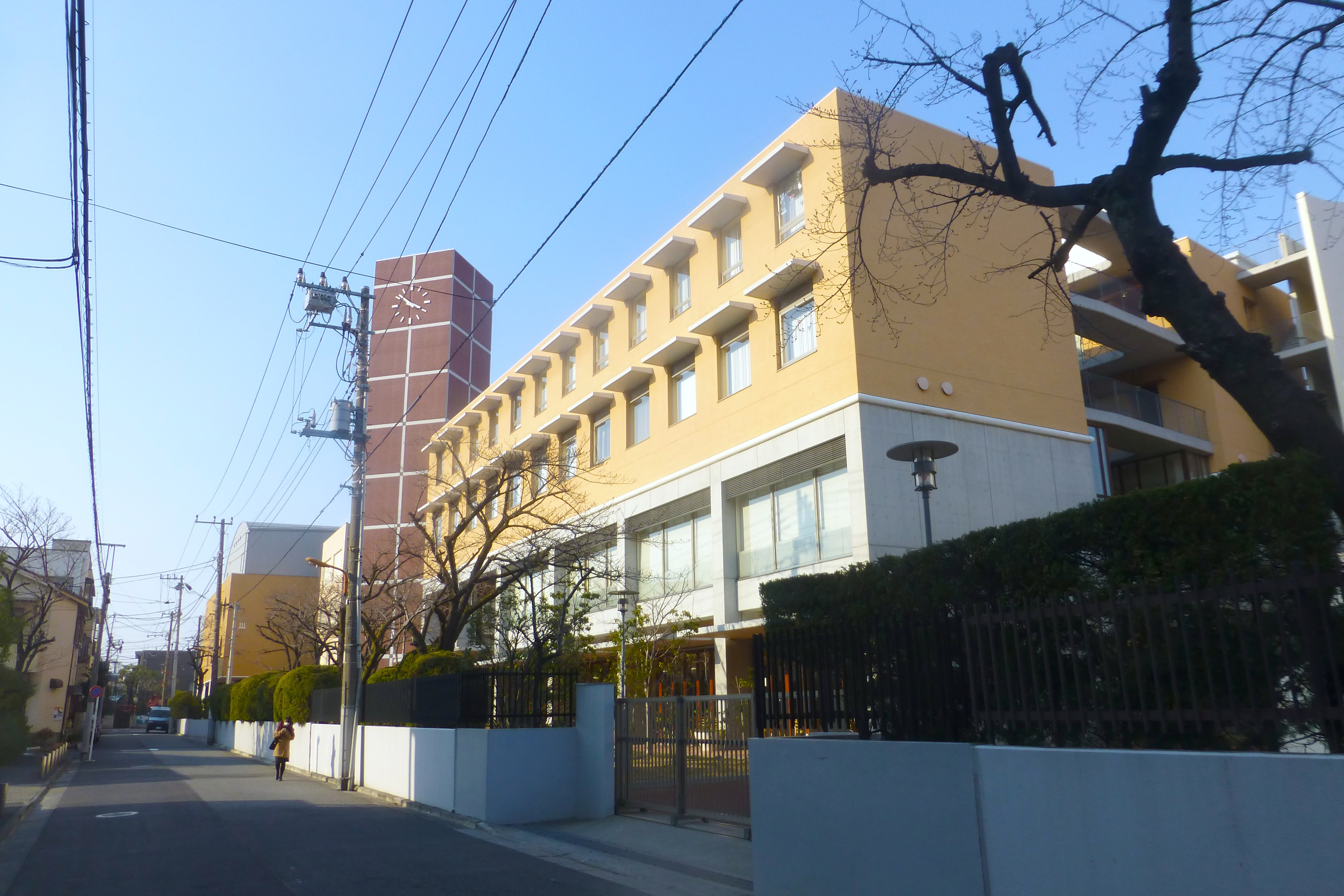
Tokyo Future University, 2014

Tokyo Future University (東京未来大学, Tōkyō mirai daigaku) is a private university in Adachi, Tokyo, Japan, established in 2006.
