= Thermo Fisher Scientific Junior Innovators Challenge =

National science competition for U.S. middle school students

Thermo Fisher Scientific Junior Innovators Challenge (Thermo Fisher JIC), a program of Society for Science, is a national science competition for U.S. middle school students.

== Overview ==
Thermo Fisher JIC reaches 60,000 students annually through the Society’s Affiliated Fair Network. Students in the top 10% of their local affiliated science fair are eligible to enter the Thermo Fisher JIC, the only national middle school STEM competition that leverages Society-affiliated science fairs as a critical component of the STEM talent pipeline. All finalists receive a $500 cash award and will participate in the Thermo Fisher JIC Finals Week in Washington, D.C., where they will compete for the top awards.

The Society’s middle school science program was first launched in 1999 to encourage achievement and communication in science and math at a younger age and to serve as the nation’s premier STEM research competition for middle school students.

Thermo Fisher’s sponsorship began in 2023, making it only the third title sponsor in the competition’s 25-year history..

Prior programs include the Broadcom MASTERS (2011-2022), Broadcom MASTERS International (2012-2022), the Society’s Middle School Program (2008), and the Discovery Channel Young Scientist Challenge (1999-2007).

== Awards ==
Thermo Fisher Scientific Junior Innovators Challenge (JIC) prizes include:

- $25,000 Thermo Fisher Scientific ASCEND Award (Aspiring Scientists Cultivating Exciting New Discoveries)
- $10,000 Broadcom Coding with Commitment® Award
- $10,000 Citadel | Citadel Securities Innovation Award
- $10,000 DoW STEM Talent Award
- $10,000 The Lemelson Foundation Award for Invention
- 1st and 2nd place STEM awards awarded in Science, Technology, Engineering, and Math categories. First place receives $3,500 and second place receives $2,500 to be used towards educational experiences. Both first and second place winners also receive an iPad.
- Team Award: Each member of the team that best demonstrates their ability to work together and solve problems through shared decision making, communication and scientific and engineering collaboration will receive a gift card to a science supply company to support their interests in STEM.

All 30 finalists receive $500 and an all-expense-paid trip to Washington, DC for finalist and a parent/guardian.

The finalist schools receive $1,000 to use on STEM activities, courtesy of Thermo Fisher Scientific.
