= Maura Tombelli =

Italian astronomer

Minor planets discovered: 197
see § List of discovered minor planets

Maura Tombelli (born 1952 in Montelupo Fiorentino) is an Italian amateur astronomer who began her training in astronomy as an observer of variable stars. She is a prolific discoverer of almost 200 minor planets, including the main-belt asteroid 7794 Sanvito, and a member of the American Association of Variable Star Observers.

== Career ==
She is known as the only Italian female astrometrist. Together with Italian astronomers Ulisse Munari and Giuseppe Forti, she initiated a five-year survey of minor planets at Asiago Astrophysical Observatory in 1994. She also shared a lot of observations with the discoverers, especially the follow-up of near-Earth objects (NEOs), and she contributed to the discovery of 15817 Lucianotesi, the first NEO found from Italy. She is currently involved in a project to build a new observatory (Osservatorio di Montelupo) near the town of Montelupo, where she lives.

== Awards and honours ==
The main-belt asteroid 9904 Mauratombelli, discovered by Italian astronomers Andrea Boattini and Luciano Tesi in 1997, is named in her honour.

== List of discovered minor planets ==
6876 Beppeforti	5 September 1994	list^{[A]}
7141 Bettarini	12 March 1994	list^{[A]}
7196 Baroni	16 January 1994	list^{[A]}
7197 Pieroangela	16 January 1994	list^{[A]}
7198 Montelupo	16 January 1994	list^{[A]}
7481 San Marcello	11 August 1994	list^{[A]}
7599 Munari	3 August 1994	list^{[A]}
7679 Asiago	15 February 1996	list^{[B]}
7715 Leonidarosino	14 February 1996	list^{[B]}
7794 Sanvito	15 January 1996	list^{[B]}
7847 Mattiaorsi	14 February 1996	list^{[B]}
7900 Portule	14 February 1996	list^{[B]}
7957 Antonella	17 January 1994	list^{[A]}
8885 Sette	13 March 1994	list^{[C]}
8925 Boattini	4 December 1996	list^{[B]}
8944 Ortigara	30 January 1997	list^{[B]}
9425 Marconcini	14 February 1996	list^{[B]}
9426 Aliante	14 February 1996	list^{[B]}
9427 Righini	14 February 1996	list^{[B]}
9897 Malerba	14 February 1996	list^{[B]}
10149 Cavagna	3 August 1994	list^{[A]}
10176 Gaiavettori	14 February 1996	list^{[B]}
10198 Pinelli	6 December 1996	list^{[B]}
10591 Caverni	13 August 1996	list^{[D]}
10928 Caprara	25 January 1998	list^{[D]}

11337 Sandro	10 August 1996	list^{[D]}
11348 Allegra	30 January 1997	list^{[B]}
11621 Duccio	15 August 1996	list^{[D]}
12033 Anselmo	31 January 1997	list^{[B]}
12044 Fabbri	29 March 1997	list^{[D]}
12433 Barbieri	15 January 1996	list^{[B]}
12470 Pinotti	31 January 1997	list
12811 Rigonistern	14 February 1996	list^{[B]}
12812 Cioni	14 February 1996	list^{[B]}
12813 Paolapaolini	14 February 1996	list^{[B]}
12814 Vittorio	13 February 1996	list^{[B]}
12927 Pinocchio	30 September 1999	list^{[E]}
13147 Foglia	24 February 1995	list
13174 Timossi	14 February 1996	list^{[B]}
13638 Fiorenza	14 February 1996	list^{[B]}
13740 Lastrucci	18 September 1998	list^{[F]}
14061 Nagincox	13 February 1996	list^{[B]}
14062 Cremaschini	14 February 1996	list^{[B]}
14568 Zanotta	19 July 1998	list^{[A]}
14659 Gregoriana	15 January 1999	list^{[D]}
14919 Robertohaver	6 August 1994	list^{[A]}
14947 Luigibussolino	15 January 1996	list^{[B]}
14953 Bevilacqua	13 February 1996	list^{[D]}
15004 Vallerani	7 December 1997	list^{[D]}
15005 Guerriero	7 December 1997	list^{[B]}

15006 Samcristoforetti	27 February 1998	list^{[D]}
15034 Décines	16 November 1998	list^{[E]}
15360 Moncalvo	14 February 1996	list^{[D]}
15375 Laetitiafoglia	30 January 1997	list^{[B]}
15418 Sergiospinelli	27 February 1998	list^{[D]}
15817 Lucianotesi	28 August 1994	list^{[A]}
15837 Mariovalori	25 February 1995	list
15853 Benedettafoglia	16 January 1996	list^{[B]}
15855 Mariasalvatore	14 February 1996	list^{[B]}
15968 Waltercugno	27 February 1998	list^{[G]}
(16152) 1999 YN_{12}	30 December 1999	list^{[E]}
16154 Dabramo	1 January 2000	list^{[A]}
16672 Bedini	17 January 1994	list^{[A]}
16879 Campai	24 January 1998	list^{[A]}
17019 Aldo	23 February 1999	list^{[D]}
17077 Pampaloni	25 April 1999	list^{[A]}
17720 Manuboccuni	7 December 1997	list
18431 Stazzema	16 January 1994	list^{[A]}
18441 Cittadivinci	5 August 1994	list^{[A]}
18583 Francescopedani	7 December 1997	list^{[A]}
18627 Rogerbonnet	27 February 1998	list^{[G]}
18628 Taniasagrati	27 February 1998	list^{[D]}
18631 Maurogherardini	27 February 1998	list^{[A]}
19331 Stefanovitale	4 December 1996	list^{[G]}
20081 Occhialini	12 March 1994	list^{[C]}

20194 Ilarialocantore	30 January 1997	list^{[G]}
20195 Mariovinci	30 January 1997	list^{[B]}
20200 Donbacky	28 February 1997	list^{[D]}
21256 Robertobattiston	14 February 1996	list^{[G]}
22401 Egisto	24 February 1995	list
22517 Alexzanardi	26 February 1998	list^{[D]}
22752 Sabrinamasiero	15 November 1998	list^{[A]}
23608 Alpiapuane	15 January 1996	list^{[B]}
24856 Messidoro	15 January 1996	list^{[G]}
24857 Sperello	15 January 1996	list^{[B]}
24890 Amaliafinzi	4 December 1996	list^{[G]}
25301 Ambrofogar	7 December 1998	list^{[A]}
25601 Francopacini	1 January 2000	list^{[E]}
(26499) 2000 CX_{1}	4 February 2000	list^{[A]}
27005 Dariaguidetti	27 February 1998	list^{[D]}
27130 Dipaola	8 December 1998	list^{[A]}
27269 Albinocarbognani	3 January 2000	list^{[A]}
27923 Dimitribartolini	4 December 1996	list^{[B]}
27983 Bernardi	26 October 1997	list^{[A]}
28007 Galhassin	7 December 1997	list^{[A]}
29346 Mariadina	25 February 1995	list
29363 Ghigabartolini	14 February 1996	list^{[B]}
29547 Yurimazzanti	25 January 1998	list^{[B]}
29549 Sandrasbaragli	25 January 1998	list^{[A]}
(29550) 1998 BE_{44}	25 January 1998	list^{[D]}

29761 Lorenzo	13 February 1999	list^{[H]}
30585 Firenze	14 August 2001	list^{[A]}
31091 Bettiventicinque	30 January 1997	list^{[B]}
31153 Enricaparri	26 October 1997	list^{[D]}
31605 Braschi	10 April 1999	list^{[A]}
33031 Paolofini	1 September 1997	list^{[A]}
33054 Eduardorossi	26 October 1997	list^{[A]}
33162 Sofiarandich	27 February 1998	list^{[D]}
33480 Bartolucci	4 April 1999	list^{[E]}
33823 Mariorigutti	3 February 2000	list^{[A]}
34004 Gregorini	30 July 2000	list^{[I]}
34696 Risoldi	21 July 2001	list^{[A]}
35222 Delbarrio	4 December 1994	list
35358 Lorifini	27 September 1997	list^{[E]}
35444 Giuliamarconcini	25 January 1998	list^{[B]}
35464 Elisaconsigli	27 February 1998	list^{[D]}
35465 Emilianoricci	27 February 1998	list^{[B]}
35703 Lafiascaia	20 March 1999	list^{[F]}
37313 Paolocampaner	16 August 2001	list^{[A]}
37835 Darioconsigli	25 January 1998	list^{[B]}
37836 Simoneterreni	25 January 1998	list^{[B]}
39871 Lucagrazzini	27 February 1998	list^{[D]}
39875 Matteolombardo	27 February 1998	list^{[D]}
43881 Cerreto	25 February 1995	list^{[G]}
43923 Cosimonoccioli	14 February 1996	list^{[B]}

44574 Lavoratti	4 April 1999	list^{[E]}
(44715) 1999 TZ_{5}	2 October 1999	list^{[A]}
46701 Interrante	7 February 1997	list^{[B]}
46702 Linapucci	28 February 1997	list^{[D]}
47473 Lorenzopinna	1 January 2000	list^{[A]}
48842 Alexmazzanti	25 January 1998	list^{[D]}
(50275) 2000 CU_{1}	4 February 2000	list^{[A]}
(50537) 2000 EH_{14}	3 March 2000	list^{[E]}
(51874) 2001 PZ_{28}	15 August 2001	list^{[A]}
(52426) 1994 PF	5 August 1994	list^{[A]}
(53053) 1998 XH_{9}	12 December 1998	list^{[D]}
54852 Mercatali	22 July 2001	list^{[E]}
54983 Simone	16 August 2001	list^{[A]}
55418 Bianciardi	13 October 2001	list^{[E]}
(56073) 1998 YO_{10}	26 December 1998	list^{[A]}
(56361) 2000 CW_{1}	4 February 2000	list^{[A]}
(57076) 2001 OY_{16}	22 July 2001	list^{[A]}
58572 Romanella	7 September 1997	list^{[D]}
58702 Tizianabitossi	25 January 1998	list^{[D]}
63463 Calamandrei	20 July 2001	list^{[E]}
65848 Enricomari	30 January 1997	list
(66000) 1998 OE_{1}	20 July 1998	list^{[A]}
(66250) 1999 GZ	4 April 1999	list^{[A]}
69585 Albertoraugei	27 February 1998	list^{[A]}
70444 Genovali	9 October 1999	list^{[E]}

(71221) 1999 YL_{9}	31 December 1999	list^{[E]}
71489 Dynamocamp	4 February 2000	list^{[E]}
(72841) 2001 HC_{32}	27 April 2001	list^{[A]}
(75887) 2000 CS_{34}	4 February 2000	list^{[E]}
(79810) 1998 VL_{33}	15 November 1998	list^{[A]}
82638 Bottariclaudio	7 August 2001	list^{[E]}
84120 Antonacci	4 September 2002	list^{[J]}
85368 Elisabettacioni	14 February 1996	list^{[B]}
85515 Annakukharskaya	26 October 1997	list^{[B]}
(85819) 1998 XF_{9}	12 December 1998	list^{[A]}
(86375) 2000 AT_{2}	1 January 2000	list^{[E]}
(88371) 2001 PF_{15}	14 August 2001	list^{[A]}
(89734) 2002 AH	4 January 2002	list^{[A]}
(91146) 1998 OA_{1}	20 July 1998	list^{[E]}
(91900) 1999 VV_{11}	5 November 1999	list^{[E]}
(94634) 2001 WQ_{14}	21 November 2001	list^{[E]}
(99388) 2002 AL	4 January 2002	list^{[A]}
99389 Marconovi	5 January 2002	list^{[E]}
100726 Marcoiozzi	25 January 1998	list^{[A]}
(101493) 1998 XB_{3}	7 December 1998	list^{[A]}
(103248) 2000 AZ_{4}	2 January 2000	list^{[A]}
(108702) 2001 OX_{16}	21 July 2001	list^{[D]}
(108952) 2001 PD_{29}	15 August 2001	list^{[A]}
(108952) 2001 PD_{29}	15 August 2001	list^{[A]}
111571 Bebevio	11 January 2002	list^{[J]}

113683 Robertoornella	2 October 2002	list^{[J]}
113684 Giannagianni	2 October 2002	list^{[J]}
118233 Gfrancoferrini	30 January 1997	list^{[B]}
120098 Telmopievani	10 March 2003	list^{[J]}
(121017) 1999 BG_{4}	19 January 1999	list^{[A]}
126161 Piazzano	4 January 2002	list^{[A]}
127415 Annacalderara	11 July 2002	list^{[J]}
135041 Lorenzofranco	21 July 2001	list^{[E]}
136848 Kevanpooler	25 January 1998	list^{[B]}
(139231) 2001 HW_{16}	22 April 2001	list^{[E]}
(139414) 2001 OR_{16}	20 July 2001	list^{[A]}
(145966) 1999 YM_{16}	30 December 1999	list^{[A]}
(148206) 2000 CL_{97}	13 February 2000	list^{[E]}
(148525) 2001 QG	16 August 2001	list^{[A]}
(150713) 2001 QF	16 August 2001	list^{[E]}
(153321) 2001 OW_{16}	21 July 2001	list^{[A]}
(155926) 2001 PE_{29}	15 August 2001	list^{[E]}
(155997) 2001 RP_{16}	12 September 2001	list^{[A]}
(159421) 1999 TN_{10}	8 October 1999	list^{[E]}
(165694) 2001 PQ_{28}	14 August 2001	list^{[A]}
(165912) 2001 TE_{7}	11 October 2001	list^{[E]}
(190730) 2001 PY_{13}	13 August 2001	list^{[A]}
(194837) 2002 AJ	4 January 2002	list^{[A]}
(219829) 2002 CR_{39}	7 February 2002	list^{[E]}
280244 Ati	27 November 2002	list^{[F]}

297314 Ilterracottaio	7 December 1998	list^{[A]}
(313036) 2000 PL	2 August 2000	list^{[E]}
317000 Simonepastore	13 August 2001	list^{[A]}
(363124) 2001 PO_{28}	13 August 2001	list^{[E]}
(624220) 2002 PS_{34}	5 August 2002	list^{[F]}
(624324) 2002 RG_{251}	6 August 2002	list^{[F]}
120097 Janniksinner	10 March 2003	list^{[J]}
Co-discovery made with:^{A} A. Boattini^{B} U. Munari^{C} V. Goretti^{D} G. Forti^{E} L. Tesi^{F} E. Masotti^{G} C. Casacci^{H} S. Bartolini^{I} D. Guidetti^{J} F. Bernardi
