= 16879 Campai =

Asteroid

Discovery
- Discovered by: A. Boattini; M. Tombelli
- Discovery site: Pistoia Mountains Obs.
- Discovery date: 24 January 1998

Designations
- Named after: Paolo Campai (Italian amateur astronomer)
- Alternative designations: 1998 BH_{10}
- Minor planet category: main-belt · (middle); Witt

Orbital characteristics
- Epoch 23 March 2018 (JD 2458200.5)
- Uncertainty parameter 0
- Observation arc: 39.78 yr (14,529 d)
- Aphelion: 2.8229 AU
- Perihelion: 2.6938 AU
- Semi-major axis: 2.7584 AU
- Eccentricity: 0.0234
- Orbital period (sidereal): 4.58 yr (1,673 d)
- Mean anomaly: 349.41°
- Mean motion: 0° 12^{m} 54.36^{s} / day
- Inclination: 7.1221°
- Longitude of ascending node: 47.289°
- Argument of perihelion: 230.77°

Physical characteristics
- Mean diameter: 10.61 km (calculated)
- Synodic rotation period: 314.2468±4.9149 h
- Geometric albedo: 0.057 (assumed)
- Spectral type: S · C (assumed)
- Absolute magnitude (H): 12.97±0.46; 13.150±0.005; 13.3 · 13.6

16879 Campai (provisional designation 1998 BH_{10}) is a stony Witt asteroid and slow rotator from the central region of the asteroid belt, approximately 10 kilometers (6 miles) in diameter. The S-type asteroid was discovered on 24 January 1998, by Italian astronomers Andrea Boattini and Maura Tombelli at the Pistoia Mountains Astronomical Observatory in San Marcello Pistoiese, Tuscany, central Italy. It was named for Italian amateur astronomer Paolo Campai.

== Orbit and classification ==
Campai is a member of the Witt family (535), a large family of (predominantly) stony asteroids with more than 1,600 known members. It orbits the Sun in the central main-belt at a distance of 2.7–2.8 AU once every 4 years and 7 months (1,673 days; semi-major axis of 2.76 AU). Its orbit has an eccentricity of 0.02 and an inclination of 7° with respect to the ecliptic. The first precovery was obtained at Siding Spring Observatory in July 1977, extending the asteroid's observation arc by 22 years prior to its discovery.

== Physical characteristics ==
Campai has been characterized as a common, stony S-type asteroid, in line with the overall spectral type for members of the Witt family.

=== Slow rotator ===
In October 2010, a rotational lightcurve of Campai was obtained from photometric observations made at the Palomar Transient Factory in California. It rendered an exceptionally long period of 314.2468±4.9149 hours with a brightness amplitude of 0.68 magnitude (U=2). While the result is based on less than full coverage, and may be refined by future observations, Campai is one of the slowest rotating asteroids known to exist.

=== Diameter and albedo ===
The Collaborative Asteroid Lightcurve Link calculates a diameter of 10.5 kilometers with an absolute magnitude of 13.6 and an assumed standard albedo for a carbonaceous asteroid of 0.057.

== Naming ==
This minor planet was named for Italian amateur astronomer Paolo Campai (born 1957) from Florence, who is specialized in teaching and astrophotography. Both discoverers made his acquaintance near Florence on a night in 1985, while observing comet 1P/Halley and α Phoenicis. The approved naming citation was published by the Minor Planet Center on 6 August 2003 (M.P.C. 49281).
