= 15817 Lucianotesi =

Asteroid

Discovery
- Discovered by: A. Boattini and M. Tombelli
- Discovery site: San Marcello Pistoiese
- Discovery date: 28 August 1994

Designations
- Named after: Luciano Tesi
- Alternative designations: MPO 328865

Orbital characteristics
- Epoch 13 January 2016 (JD 2457400.5)
- Uncertainty parameter 0
- Observation arc: 20.40 yr (7,451 d)
- Aphelion: 1.481 AU (221.584 Gm)
- Perihelion: 1.168 AU (174.750 Gm)
- Semi-major axis: 1.325 AU (198.167 Gm)
- Eccentricity: 0.1181668
- Orbital period (sidereal): 1.52 yr (556.88 d)
- Mean anomaly: 71.191100°
- Mean motion: 0° 38^{m} 47.272^{s} / day
- Inclination: 13.873342°
- Longitude of ascending node: 162.51250°
- Argument of perihelion: 94.313780°

Physical characteristics
- Mean diameter: 0.7 km
- Synodic rotation period: 11 h (0.46 d)
- Absolute magnitude (H): 18.5

15817 Lucianotesi (or 1994 QC) is an Amor asteroid discovered on August 28, 1994, by A. Boattini and M. Tombelli at San Marcello Pistoiese.
