= List of minor planets: 624001–625000 =

The following is a partial list of minor planets, running from minor-planet number 624001 through 625000, inclusive. The primary data for this and other partial lists is based on JPL's "Small-Body Orbital Elements" and data available from the Minor Planet Center. Critical list information is also provided by the MPC, unless otherwise specified from Lowell Observatory. A detailed description of the table's columns and additional sources are given on the main page including a complete list of every page in this series, and a statistical break-up on the dynamical classification of minor planets.

Also see the summary list of all named bodies in numerical and alphabetical order, and the corresponding naming citations for the number range of this particular list. New namings may only be added to this list after official publication, as the preannouncement of names is condemned by the Working Group for Small Bodies Nomenclature of the International Astronomical Union.

Near-Earth obj.	MBA (inner)	MBA (outer)	Centaur
Mars-crosser	MBA (middle)	Jupiter trojan	Trans-Neptunian obj.
Unclassified

== 624001–624100 ==
Designation			Discovery			Properties		Ref
Permanent	Provisional	Named after	Date	Site	Discoverer(s)	Category	Diam.	Ref
624001	2001 FC_{198}	—	March 21, 2001	Kitt Peak	SKADS	·	1.2 km	MPC · JPL
624002	2001 FL_{198}	—	October 7, 2007	Pla D'Arguines	R. Ferrando, Ferrando, M.	·	1.2 km	MPC · JPL
624003	2001 FH_{207}	—	March 21, 2001	Kitt Peak	Spacewatch	·	710 m	MPC · JPL
624004	2001 FG_{209}	—	March 21, 2001	Kitt Peak	SKADS	MAS	400 m	MPC · JPL
624005	2001 FD_{212}	—	October 19, 2006	Mount Lemmon	Mount Lemmon Survey	·	670 m	MPC · JPL
624006	2001 FA_{215}	—	August 23, 2007	Kitt Peak	Spacewatch	·	1.2 km	MPC · JPL
624007	2001 FE_{217}	—	October 18, 2009	Mount Lemmon	Mount Lemmon Survey	·	1.0 km	MPC · JPL
624008	2001 FZ_{220}	—	March 26, 2001	Kitt Peak	Deep Ecliptic Survey	V	550 m	MPC · JPL
624009	2001 FY_{227}	—	March 22, 2001	Kitt Peak	SKADS	·	1.1 km	MPC · JPL
624010	2001 FB_{228}	—	September 19, 2009	Mount Lemmon	Mount Lemmon Survey	·	590 m	MPC · JPL
624011	2001 FB_{231}	—	November 1, 2007	Mount Lemmon	Mount Lemmon Survey	·	870 m	MPC · JPL
624012	2001 FG_{231}	—	March 29, 2001	Kitt Peak	SKADS	·	920 m	MPC · JPL
624013	2001 FO_{234}	—	October 8, 2004	Kitt Peak	Spacewatch	·	1.4 km	MPC · JPL
624014	2001 FW_{240}	—	September 19, 2009	Mount Lemmon	Mount Lemmon Survey	·	2.1 km	MPC · JPL
624015	2001 FN_{243}	—	April 6, 2005	Mount Lemmon	Mount Lemmon Survey	·	1.0 km	MPC · JPL
624016	2001 FO_{244}	—	April 24, 2008	Mount Lemmon	Mount Lemmon Survey	·	580 m	MPC · JPL
624017	2001 FP_{246}	—	February 9, 2008	Kitt Peak	Spacewatch	PHO	660 m	MPC · JPL
624018	2001 FR_{247}	—	September 17, 2014	Haleakala	Pan-STARRS 1	·	1.7 km	MPC · JPL
624019	2001 HW_{38}	—	April 26, 2001	Kitt Peak	Spacewatch	·	680 m	MPC · JPL
624020	2001 KQ_{80}	—	April 11, 2010	Mount Lemmon	Mount Lemmon Survey	·	860 m	MPC · JPL
624021	2001 KW_{81}	—	September 16, 2003	Kitt Peak	Spacewatch	·	780 m	MPC · JPL
624022	2001 KE_{82}	—	November 6, 2010	Mount Lemmon	Mount Lemmon Survey	NYS	660 m	MPC · JPL
624023	2001 KQ_{82}	—	February 14, 2013	Haleakala	Pan-STARRS 1	·	750 m	MPC · JPL
624024	2001 KS_{84}	—	June 20, 2015	Haleakala	Pan-STARRS 1	·	980 m	MPC · JPL
624025	2001 KE_{85}	—	May 24, 2001	Cerro Tololo	Deep Ecliptic Survey	NYS	870 m	MPC · JPL
624026	2001 KN_{89}	—	May 23, 2001	Cerro Tololo	Deep Ecliptic Survey	·	1.3 km	MPC · JPL
624027	2001 MY_{31}	—	October 21, 2015	Haleakala	Pan-STARRS 1	·	1.6 km	MPC · JPL
624028	2001 NH_{13}	—	June 27, 2001	Palomar	NEAT	(5)	1.5 km	MPC · JPL
624029	2001 OW_{44}	—	July 20, 2001	Anderson Mesa	LONEOS	·	570 m	MPC · JPL
624030	2001 PH_{17}	—	August 9, 2001	Palomar	NEAT	·	650 m	MPC · JPL
624031	2001 PO_{67}	—	August 14, 2001	Haleakala	NEAT	·	1.4 km	MPC · JPL
624032	2001 QZ_{99}	—	August 23, 2001	Socorro	LINEAR	·	1.5 km	MPC · JPL
624033	2001 QR_{100}	—	August 21, 2001	Palomar	NEAT	·	1.8 km	MPC · JPL
624034	2001 QQ_{102}	—	July 18, 2001	Haleakala	NEAT	·	1.3 km	MPC · JPL
624035	2001 QT_{188}	—	August 22, 2001	Kitt Peak	Spacewatch	DOR	1.9 km	MPC · JPL
624036	2001 QP_{202}	—	August 14, 2001	Haleakala	NEAT	·	1.3 km	MPC · JPL
624037	2001 QW_{205}	—	August 16, 2001	Socorro	LINEAR	(32418)	1.5 km	MPC · JPL
624038	2001 QM_{306}	—	August 19, 2001	Cerro Tololo	Deep Ecliptic Survey	·	480 m	MPC · JPL
624039	2001 QU_{327}	—	August 17, 2001	Palomar	NEAT	·	3.1 km	MPC · JPL
624040	2001 QL_{332}	—	September 20, 2001	Socorro	LINEAR	·	1.4 km	MPC · JPL
624041	2001 QQ_{335}	—	August 17, 2009	Kitt Peak	Spacewatch	H	510 m	MPC · JPL
624042	2001 QV_{337}	—	February 26, 2009	Catalina	CSS	·	2.0 km	MPC · JPL
624043	2001 QT_{338}	—	October 3, 2013	Haleakala	Pan-STARRS 1	·	2.0 km	MPC · JPL
624044	2001 RS_{15}	—	July 16, 2001	Anderson Mesa	LONEOS	·	830 m	MPC · JPL
624045	2001 RW_{52}	—	September 11, 2001	Anderson Mesa	LONEOS	·	1.6 km	MPC · JPL
624046	2001 RY_{153}	—	September 14, 2001	Palomar	NEAT	·	820 m	MPC · JPL
624047	2001 RB_{158}	—	August 26, 2012	Haleakala	Pan-STARRS 1	·	2.0 km	MPC · JPL
624048	2001 SC_{11}	—	July 14, 2001	Palomar	NEAT	·	1.8 km	MPC · JPL
624049	2001 SU_{66}	—	September 17, 2001	Socorro	LINEAR	·	1.2 km	MPC · JPL
624050	2001 SO_{81}	—	August 27, 2001	Anderson Mesa	LONEOS	·	1.4 km	MPC · JPL
624051	2001 SS_{93}	—	August 28, 2001	Kitt Peak	Spacewatch	·	1.6 km	MPC · JPL
624052	2001 SD_{95}	—	September 20, 2001	Socorro	LINEAR	·	580 m	MPC · JPL
624053	2001 SW_{96}	—	September 20, 2001	Socorro	LINEAR	(18466)	1.5 km	MPC · JPL
624054	2001 SF_{112}	—	September 19, 2001	Socorro	LINEAR	H	510 m	MPC · JPL
624055	2001 SR_{116}	—	September 16, 2001	Socorro	LINEAR	H	460 m	MPC · JPL
624056	2001 SF_{194}	—	September 19, 2001	Socorro	LINEAR	·	930 m	MPC · JPL
624057	2001 SD_{201}	—	September 19, 2001	Socorro	LINEAR	V	460 m	MPC · JPL
624058	2001 SU_{209}	—	September 19, 2001	Socorro	LINEAR	AEO	1.0 km	MPC · JPL
624059	2001 SP_{229}	—	September 19, 2001	Socorro	LINEAR	·	1.4 km	MPC · JPL
624060	2001 SD_{251}	—	September 19, 2001	Socorro	LINEAR	·	1.4 km	MPC · JPL
624061	2001 SD_{269}	—	September 19, 2001	Kitt Peak	Spacewatch	·	790 m	MPC · JPL
624062	2001 SU_{273}	—	September 19, 2001	Kitt Peak	Spacewatch	·	1.7 km	MPC · JPL
624063	2001 SY_{289}	—	August 12, 2001	Palomar	NEAT	(1547)	1.3 km	MPC · JPL
624064	2001 SO_{318}	—	September 21, 2001	Socorro	LINEAR	·	850 m	MPC · JPL
624065	2001 SH_{320}	—	September 21, 2001	Socorro	LINEAR	AEO	940 m	MPC · JPL
624066	2001 SW_{330}	—	September 19, 2001	Socorro	LINEAR	NYS	910 m	MPC · JPL
624067	2001 SX_{340}	—	September 21, 2001	Socorro	LINEAR	·	2.6 km	MPC · JPL
624068	2001 SZ_{340}	—	September 21, 2001	Socorro	LINEAR	·	1.4 km	MPC · JPL
624069	2001 SV_{353}	—	September 21, 2001	Socorro	LINEAR	ERI	1.1 km	MPC · JPL
624070	2001 SG_{355}	—	September 18, 2001	Apache Point	SDSS Collaboration	L5	8.1 km	MPC · JPL
624071	2001 SW_{357}	—	February 13, 2008	Kitt Peak	Spacewatch	·	1.8 km	MPC · JPL
624072	2001 SP_{358}	—	September 19, 2001	Apache Point	SDSS Collaboration	T_{j} (2.93) · 3:2	6.3 km	MPC · JPL
624073	2001 ST_{360}	—	October 16, 2007	Catalina	CSS	·	2.5 km	MPC · JPL
624074	2001 SZ_{360}	—	October 21, 2006	Kitt Peak	Spacewatch	·	1.2 km	MPC · JPL
624075	2001 SE_{361}	—	September 4, 2010	Kitt Peak	Spacewatch	·	1.2 km	MPC · JPL
624076	2001 SQ_{363}	—	June 20, 2015	Haleakala	Pan-STARRS 1	·	1.6 km	MPC · JPL
624077	2001 SP_{364}	—	September 16, 2001	Kitt Peak	Spacewatch	·	920 m	MPC · JPL
624078	2001 TC_{14}	—	September 19, 2001	Kitt Peak	Spacewatch	·	920 m	MPC · JPL
624079	2001 TU_{25}	—	October 7, 2001	Palomar	NEAT	·	1.6 km	MPC · JPL
624080	2001 TT_{59}	—	October 7, 2001	Palomar	NEAT	NYS	1.0 km	MPC · JPL
624081	2001 TE_{131}	—	October 10, 2001	Palomar	NEAT	·	900 m	MPC · JPL
624082	2001 TV_{135}	—	August 16, 2001	Palomar	NEAT	JUN	1.1 km	MPC · JPL
624083	2001 TN_{225}	—	October 10, 2001	Palomar	NEAT	·	1.1 km	MPC · JPL
624084	2001 TL_{228}	—	September 19, 2001	Kitt Peak	Spacewatch	·	1.3 km	MPC · JPL
624085	2001 TQ_{235}	—	October 16, 2001	Socorro	LINEAR	·	1.5 km	MPC · JPL
624086	2001 TM_{237}	—	October 11, 2001	Palomar	NEAT	·	890 m	MPC · JPL
624087	2001 TV_{240}	—	October 14, 2001	Socorro	LINEAR	·	1.2 km	MPC · JPL
624088	2001 TJ_{259}	—	October 11, 2001	Palomar	NEAT	·	1.7 km	MPC · JPL
624089	2001 TV_{259}	—	October 26, 2001	Kitt Peak	Spacewatch	NYS	880 m	MPC · JPL
624090	2001 TY_{261}	—	September 23, 2008	Mount Lemmon	Mount Lemmon Survey	·	610 m	MPC · JPL
624091	2001 TY_{262}	—	November 10, 2005	Mount Lemmon	Mount Lemmon Survey	·	790 m	MPC · JPL
624092	2001 TZ_{264}	—	November 1, 2005	Kitt Peak	Spacewatch	·	1.0 km	MPC · JPL
624093	2001 TM_{265}	—	October 29, 2005	Mount Lemmon	Mount Lemmon Survey	MAS	600 m	MPC · JPL
624094	2001 TZ_{266}	—	July 29, 2008	Kitt Peak	Spacewatch	·	750 m	MPC · JPL
624095	2001 TG_{267}	—	October 24, 2009	Kitt Peak	Spacewatch	3:2	4.6 km	MPC · JPL
624096	2001 TN_{267}	—	September 16, 2012	Catalina	CSS	·	2.0 km	MPC · JPL
624097	2001 TS_{267}	—	October 19, 2006	Mount Lemmon	Mount Lemmon Survey	AGN	790 m	MPC · JPL
624098	2001 UA_{8}	—	October 14, 2001	Kitt Peak	Spacewatch	·	1.2 km	MPC · JPL
624099	2001 UN_{11}	—	October 23, 2001	Socorro	LINEAR	H	550 m	MPC · JPL
624100	2001 UD_{25}	—	September 25, 2001	Socorro	LINEAR	·	1.1 km	MPC · JPL

== 624101–624200 ==
back to top

Designation			Discovery			Properties		Ref
Permanent	Provisional	Named after	Date	Site	Discoverer(s)	Category	Diam.	Ref
624101	2001 UZ_{68}	—	October 17, 2001	Kitt Peak	Spacewatch	·	1.4 km	MPC · JPL
624102	2001 UK_{78}	—	October 20, 2001	Socorro	LINEAR	·	1.3 km	MPC · JPL
624103	2001 UX_{87}	—	October 21, 2001	Kitt Peak	Spacewatch	·	840 m	MPC · JPL
624104	2001 UU_{105}	—	October 20, 2001	Socorro	LINEAR	·	930 m	MPC · JPL
624105	2001 UN_{107}	—	October 10, 2001	Kitt Peak	Spacewatch	·	1.3 km	MPC · JPL
624106	2001 UO_{129}	—	October 18, 2001	Palomar	NEAT	·	3.5 km	MPC · JPL
624107	2001 US_{129}	—	October 17, 2001	Kitt Peak	Spacewatch	NYS	680 m	MPC · JPL
624108	2001 UG_{131}	—	October 11, 2001	Kitt Peak	Spacewatch	·	1.2 km	MPC · JPL
624109	2001 UQ_{142}	—	September 19, 2001	Socorro	LINEAR	·	1.0 km	MPC · JPL
624110	2001 UD_{166}	—	September 19, 2001	Ondřejov	Ondřejov, Observatoř	·	960 m	MPC · JPL
624111	2001 UG_{196}	—	September 17, 2001	Socorro	LINEAR	·	1.5 km	MPC · JPL
624112	2001 US_{196}	—	October 14, 2001	Kitt Peak	Spacewatch	THB	2.2 km	MPC · JPL
624113	2001 UF_{200}	—	October 21, 2001	Socorro	LINEAR	·	2.4 km	MPC · JPL
624114	2001 UL_{230}	—	October 16, 2001	Palomar	NEAT	·	600 m	MPC · JPL
624115	2001 UE_{234}	—	March 10, 2008	Kitt Peak	Spacewatch	·	1.4 km	MPC · JPL
624116	2001 UE_{235}	—	October 23, 2001	Palomar	NEAT	·	470 m	MPC · JPL
624117	2001 UK_{236}	—	December 13, 2006	Kitt Peak	Spacewatch	·	1.7 km	MPC · JPL
624118	2001 UN_{236}	—	October 12, 2010	Mount Lemmon	Mount Lemmon Survey	·	1.4 km	MPC · JPL
624119	2001 UQ_{236}	—	August 28, 2005	Kitt Peak	Spacewatch	·	1.3 km	MPC · JPL
624120	2001 UZ_{236}	—	October 13, 2010	Kitt Peak	Spacewatch	·	1.0 km	MPC · JPL
624121	2001 UO_{237}	—	October 25, 2001	Apache Point	SDSS Collaboration	EUP	3.1 km	MPC · JPL
624122	2001 UU_{238}	—	September 16, 2017	Haleakala	Pan-STARRS 1	H	430 m	MPC · JPL
624123	2001 UW_{238}	—	September 1, 2010	Mount Lemmon	Mount Lemmon Survey	·	1.4 km	MPC · JPL
624124	2001 UP_{239}	—	October 18, 2012	Haleakala	Pan-STARRS 1	·	790 m	MPC · JPL
624125	2001 UQ_{239}	—	November 20, 2014	Haleakala	Pan-STARRS 1	L5	6.7 km	MPC · JPL
624126	2001 VF_{133}	—	November 11, 2001	Apache Point	SDSS Collaboration	NEM	1.5 km	MPC · JPL
624127	2001 VD_{136}	—	October 17, 2010	Mount Lemmon	Mount Lemmon Survey	·	1.4 km	MPC · JPL
624128	2001 VN_{136}	—	January 28, 2015	Haleakala	Pan-STARRS 1	·	2.3 km	MPC · JPL
624129	2001 VR_{136}	—	April 23, 2015	Haleakala	Pan-STARRS 1	·	2.5 km	MPC · JPL
624130	2001 VY_{137}	—	November 2, 2010	Kitt Peak	Spacewatch	·	1.4 km	MPC · JPL
624131	2001 WV_{7}	—	November 17, 2001	Socorro	LINEAR	·	1.7 km	MPC · JPL
624132	2001 WK_{46}	—	November 19, 2001	Socorro	LINEAR	PHO	1.0 km	MPC · JPL
624133	2001 WJ_{60}	—	November 19, 2001	Socorro	LINEAR	NYS	1.0 km	MPC · JPL
624134	2001 WG_{78}	—	November 20, 2001	Socorro	LINEAR	JUN	820 m	MPC · JPL
624135	2001 WY_{85}	—	November 20, 2001	Kitt Peak	Spacewatch	·	860 m	MPC · JPL
624136	2001 WF_{91}	—	October 21, 2001	Socorro	LINEAR	·	1.9 km	MPC · JPL
624137	2001 WN_{93}	—	November 20, 2001	Socorro	LINEAR	ERI	1.2 km	MPC · JPL
624138	2001 WM_{105}	—	September 6, 2008	Kitt Peak	Spacewatch	NYS	1.0 km	MPC · JPL
624139	2001 WY_{105}	—	April 29, 2008	Kitt Peak	Spacewatch	·	1.5 km	MPC · JPL
624140	2001 WA_{106}	—	November 2, 2010	Mount Lemmon	Mount Lemmon Survey	·	1.4 km	MPC · JPL
624141	2001 XG_{79}	—	November 19, 2001	Socorro	LINEAR	·	960 m	MPC · JPL
624142	2001 XF_{120}	—	October 10, 2001	Palomar	NEAT	·	1.3 km	MPC · JPL
624143	2001 XO_{200}	—	December 15, 2001	Socorro	LINEAR	JUN	900 m	MPC · JPL
624144	2001 XZ_{248}	—	December 14, 2001	Kitt Peak	Spacewatch	(18466)	1.5 km	MPC · JPL
624145	2001 XY_{251}	—	December 14, 2001	Socorro	LINEAR	·	1.1 km	MPC · JPL
624146	2001 YZ_{1}	—	December 18, 2001	Socorro	LINEAR	H	560 m	MPC · JPL
624147	2001 YD_{10}	—	December 17, 2001	Socorro	LINEAR	·	1.6 km	MPC · JPL
624148	2001 YF_{31}	—	November 20, 2001	Kitt Peak	Spacewatch	·	670 m	MPC · JPL
624149	2001 YT_{88}	—	December 18, 2001	Socorro	LINEAR	·	1.4 km	MPC · JPL
624150	2001 YS_{164}	—	September 28, 2008	Mount Lemmon	Mount Lemmon Survey	·	1.3 km	MPC · JPL
624151	2002 AF_{26}	—	January 9, 2002	Kitt Peak	Spacewatch	MRX	910 m	MPC · JPL
624152	2002 AY_{192}	—	January 12, 2002	Kitt Peak	Spacewatch	NYS	870 m	MPC · JPL
624153	2002 AN_{193}	—	February 20, 2006	Kitt Peak	Spacewatch	·	860 m	MPC · JPL
624154	2002 AR_{211}	—	November 18, 2006	Kitt Peak	Spacewatch	URS	2.4 km	MPC · JPL
624155	2002 AH_{212}	—	February 27, 2006	Mount Lemmon	Mount Lemmon Survey	NYS	990 m	MPC · JPL
624156	2002 AL_{212}	—	September 14, 2007	Mount Lemmon	Mount Lemmon Survey	·	410 m	MPC · JPL
624157	2002 AP_{212}	—	September 6, 2008	Kitt Peak	Spacewatch	MAS	670 m	MPC · JPL
624158	2002 BR_{33}	—	November 3, 2010	Mount Lemmon	Mount Lemmon Survey	KOR	1.1 km	MPC · JPL
624159	2002 BK_{34}	—	January 19, 2002	Kitt Peak	Spacewatch	NYS	650 m	MPC · JPL
624160	2002 CJ_{226}	—	January 12, 2002	Palomar	NEAT	·	1.7 km	MPC · JPL
624161	2002 CP_{249}	—	February 6, 2002	Kitt Peak	Deep Ecliptic Survey	·	1.4 km	MPC · JPL
624162	2002 CS_{262}	—	February 9, 2002	Kitt Peak	Spacewatch	·	1.8 km	MPC · JPL
624163	2002 CX_{321}	—	October 12, 2007	Mount Lemmon	Mount Lemmon Survey	·	510 m	MPC · JPL
624164	2002 CO_{323}	—	February 9, 2002	Kitt Peak	Spacewatch	·	490 m	MPC · JPL
624165	2002 CO_{324}	—	November 3, 2015	Mount Lemmon	Mount Lemmon Survey	·	1.8 km	MPC · JPL
624166	2002 CR_{327}	—	December 5, 2010	Mount Lemmon	Mount Lemmon Survey	·	1.1 km	MPC · JPL
624167	2002 CS_{327}	—	March 10, 2016	Haleakala	Pan-STARRS 1	·	1.2 km	MPC · JPL
624168	2002 CZ_{328}	—	February 14, 2002	Kitt Peak	Spacewatch	·	840 m	MPC · JPL
624169	2002 DY_{19}	—	February 16, 2002	Palomar	NEAT	H	420 m	MPC · JPL
624170	2002 ET_{76}	—	March 11, 2002	Kitt Peak	Spacewatch	·	1.0 km	MPC · JPL
624171	2002 EH_{116}	—	March 11, 2002	Palomar	NEAT	·	680 m	MPC · JPL
624172	2002 EV_{162}	—	March 11, 2002	Palomar	NEAT	·	1.3 km	MPC · JPL
624173	2002 ER_{163}	—	March 12, 2002	Apache Point	SDSS	·	1.2 km	MPC · JPL
624174	2002 EA_{170}	—	March 5, 2002	Kitt Peak	Spacewatch	THM	1.7 km	MPC · JPL
624175	2002 FH_{6}	—	March 21, 2002	Socorro	LINEAR	H	450 m	MPC · JPL
624176	2002 FK_{32}	—	March 5, 2002	Anderson Mesa	LONEOS	·	950 m	MPC · JPL
624177	2002 FH_{44}	—	March 21, 2002	Kitt Peak	Spacewatch	·	480 m	MPC · JPL
624178	2002 FJ_{44}	—	March 21, 2002	Kitt Peak	Spacewatch	·	2.2 km	MPC · JPL
624179	2002 GH_{31}	—	April 7, 2002	Cerro Tololo	Deep Ecliptic Survey	JUN	720 m	MPC · JPL
624180	2002 GS_{157}	—	April 13, 2002	Palomar	NEAT	·	720 m	MPC · JPL
624181	2002 GL_{175}	—	April 11, 2002	Socorro	LINEAR	·	760 m	MPC · JPL
624182	2002 GM_{195}	—	November 3, 2014	Mount Lemmon	Mount Lemmon Survey	·	1.4 km	MPC · JPL
624183	2002 LC_{64}	—	June 2, 2002	Palomar	NEAT	·	910 m	MPC · JPL
624184	2002 LE_{64}	—	June 2, 2002	Palomar	NEAT	·	610 m	MPC · JPL
624185	2002 LO_{64}	—	February 1, 2008	Kitt Peak	Spacewatch	·	810 m	MPC · JPL
624186	2002 LJ_{66}	—	April 13, 2013	Haleakala	Pan-STARRS 1	·	2.7 km	MPC · JPL
624187	2002 MQ	—	June 17, 2002	Campo Imperatore	CINEOS	·	1.1 km	MPC · JPL
624188	2002 MA_{6}	—	June 25, 2002	Palomar	NEAT	·	1.2 km	MPC · JPL
624189	2002 MM_{6}	—	June 25, 2002	Palomar	NEAT	·	1.6 km	MPC · JPL
624190	2002 MT_{7}	—	July 20, 2002	Palomar	NEAT	·	590 m	MPC · JPL
624191	2002 NH_{61}	—	August 9, 2002	Cerro Tololo	Deep Ecliptic Survey	·	560 m	MPC · JPL
624192	2002 NJ_{71}	—	July 8, 2002	Palomar	NEAT	·	670 m	MPC · JPL
624193	2002 NY_{71}	—	July 9, 2002	Palomar	NEAT	·	910 m	MPC · JPL
624194	2002 NY_{73}	—	August 27, 2002	Palomar	NEAT	·	1.1 km	MPC · JPL
624195	2002 NA_{75}	—	July 8, 2002	Palomar	NEAT	·	560 m	MPC · JPL
624196	2002 NP_{76}	—	August 14, 2002	Kitt Peak	Spacewatch	·	1.0 km	MPC · JPL
624197	2002 NJ_{77}	—	July 15, 2002	Palomar	NEAT	(5)	1.1 km	MPC · JPL
624198	2002 NV_{78}	—	October 23, 2006	Mount Lemmon	Mount Lemmon Survey	·	730 m	MPC · JPL
624199	2002 NB_{80}	—	July 8, 2002	Palomar	NEAT	·	1.0 km	MPC · JPL
624200	2002 NN_{81}	—	August 5, 2002	Palomar	NEAT	·	1.0 km	MPC · JPL

== 624201–624300 ==
back to top

Designation			Discovery			Properties		Ref
Permanent	Provisional	Named after	Date	Site	Discoverer(s)	Category	Diam.	Ref
624201	2002 NC_{82}	—	August 5, 2002	Palomar	NEAT	·	560 m	MPC · JPL
624202	2002 NS_{82}	—	July 18, 2002	Palomar	NEAT	·	2.7 km	MPC · JPL
624203	2002 NY_{83}	—	November 26, 2014	Haleakala	Pan-STARRS 1	·	2.0 km	MPC · JPL
624204	2002 OM_{29}	—	July 22, 2002	Palomar	NEAT	·	580 m	MPC · JPL
624205	2002 OW_{30}	—	July 20, 2002	Palomar	NEAT	·	3.3 km	MPC · JPL
624206	2002 OC_{36}	—	May 31, 2006	Mount Lemmon	Mount Lemmon Survey	JUN	720 m	MPC · JPL
624207	2002 OZ_{36}	—	July 19, 2002	Palomar	NEAT	·	800 m	MPC · JPL
624208	2002 OB_{37}	—	October 23, 2006	Kitt Peak	Spacewatch	·	1.1 km	MPC · JPL
624209	2002 OD_{37}	—	August 30, 2011	Haleakala	Pan-STARRS 1	·	1.1 km	MPC · JPL
624210	2002 OK_{37}	—	September 2, 2008	Kitt Peak	Spacewatch	T_{j} (2.99) · EUP	2.4 km	MPC · JPL
624211	2002 OL_{37}	—	November 25, 2006	Kitt Peak	Spacewatch	PHO	1.1 km	MPC · JPL
624212	2002 OB_{38}	—	July 15, 2013	Haleakala	Pan-STARRS 1	·	2.7 km	MPC · JPL
624213	2002 OE_{38}	—	July 22, 2002	Palomar	NEAT	·	1.0 km	MPC · JPL
624214	2002 ON_{38}	—	September 15, 2013	Haleakala	Pan-STARRS 1	·	600 m	MPC · JPL
624215	2002 PJ_{2}	—	August 3, 2002	Palomar	NEAT	EUP	2.8 km	MPC · JPL
624216	2002 PU_{6}	—	August 3, 2002	Palomar	NEAT	·	530 m	MPC · JPL
624217	2002 PU_{15}	—	August 6, 2002	Palomar	NEAT	·	1.3 km	MPC · JPL
624218	2002 PW_{21}	—	July 14, 2002	Palomar	NEAT	·	1.1 km	MPC · JPL
624219	2002 PH_{22}	—	August 6, 2002	Palomar	NEAT	(5)	1.1 km	MPC · JPL
624220	2002 PS_{34}	—	August 5, 2002	Campo Imperatore	CINEOS	·	1.3 km	MPC · JPL
624221	2002 PX_{103}	—	August 5, 2002	Palomar	NEAT	·	720 m	MPC · JPL
624222	2002 PM_{113}	—	August 8, 2002	Palomar	NEAT	·	1.4 km	MPC · JPL
624223	2002 PE_{138}	—	August 15, 2002	Palomar	NEAT	·	2.0 km	MPC · JPL
624224	2002 PG_{138}	—	August 5, 2002	Palomar	NEAT	·	2.1 km	MPC · JPL
624225	2002 PN_{165}	—	August 8, 2002	Palomar	NEAT	·	1.3 km	MPC · JPL
624226	2002 PV_{166}	—	August 12, 2002	Socorro	LINEAR	·	2.7 km	MPC · JPL
624227	2002 PC_{173}	—	August 8, 2002	Palomar	NEAT	MAS	460 m	MPC · JPL
624228	2002 PS_{173}	—	August 8, 2002	Palomar	NEAT	·	890 m	MPC · JPL
624229	2002 PA_{177}	—	August 15, 2002	Palomar	NEAT	·	1.3 km	MPC · JPL
624230	2002 PF_{189}	—	August 7, 2002	Palomar	NEAT	H	470 m	MPC · JPL
624231	2002 PP_{189}	—	August 8, 2002	Palomar	NEAT	ADE	1.8 km	MPC · JPL
624232	2002 PQ_{192}	—	August 27, 2002	Palomar	NEAT	·	1.8 km	MPC · JPL
624233	2002 PN_{197}	—	August 11, 2002	Palomar	NEAT	EUN	860 m	MPC · JPL
624234	2002 PH_{198}	—	September 30, 2006	Mount Lemmon	Mount Lemmon Survey	·	1.1 km	MPC · JPL
624235	2002 PR_{198}	—	September 10, 2002	Palomar	NEAT	·	1.1 km	MPC · JPL
624236	2002 PA_{199}	—	June 25, 2011	Mount Lemmon	Mount Lemmon Survey	·	1.5 km	MPC · JPL
624237	2002 PQ_{199}	—	November 18, 2007	Mount Lemmon	Mount Lemmon Survey	·	1.4 km	MPC · JPL
624238	2002 PR_{199}	—	August 11, 2002	Palomar	NEAT	·	550 m	MPC · JPL
624239	2002 PV_{200}	—	August 6, 2002	Palomar	NEAT	·	570 m	MPC · JPL
624240	2002 PO_{202}	—	August 13, 2002	Palomar	NEAT	·	630 m	MPC · JPL
624241	2002 PP_{203}	—	October 8, 2015	Haleakala	Pan-STARRS 1	·	1 km	MPC · JPL
624242	2002 PF_{206}	—	August 15, 2002	Kitt Peak	Spacewatch	·	680 m	MPC · JPL
624243	2002 QC_{12}	—	August 26, 2002	Palomar	NEAT	·	720 m	MPC · JPL
624244	2002 QK_{15}	—	August 16, 2002	Palomar	NEAT	·	1.8 km	MPC · JPL
624245	2002 QD_{18}	—	August 28, 2002	Palomar	NEAT	·	2.3 km	MPC · JPL
624246	2002 QO_{25}	—	August 29, 2002	Kitt Peak	Spacewatch	·	2.3 km	MPC · JPL
624247	2002 QT_{28}	—	July 16, 2002	Palomar	NEAT	·	1.0 km	MPC · JPL
624248	2002 QO_{43}	—	July 29, 2002	Palomar	NEAT	(5)	1.6 km	MPC · JPL
624249	2002 QF_{45}	—	August 17, 2002	Haleakala	NEAT	·	1.9 km	MPC · JPL
624250	2002 QC_{47}	—	August 28, 2002	Palomar	NEAT	JUN	840 m	MPC · JPL
624251	2002 QP_{51}	—	August 29, 2002	Palomar	NEAT	·	710 m	MPC · JPL
624252	2002 QR_{51}	—	August 29, 2002	Palomar	NEAT	·	2.1 km	MPC · JPL
624253	2002 QU_{51}	—	August 29, 2002	Palomar	NEAT	·	1.3 km	MPC · JPL
624254	2002 QT_{60}	—	August 17, 2002	Palomar	NEAT	·	730 m	MPC · JPL
624255	2002 QN_{65}	—	August 28, 2002	Palomar	NEAT	BRG	1.1 km	MPC · JPL
624256	2002 QQ_{71}	—	August 17, 2002	Palomar	NEAT	·	1.3 km	MPC · JPL
624257	2002 QH_{77}	—	September 2, 2002	Kitt Peak	Spacewatch	·	1.9 km	MPC · JPL
624258	2002 QP_{79}	—	August 17, 2002	Palomar	NEAT	·	1.4 km	MPC · JPL
624259	2002 QG_{85}	—	August 16, 2002	Haleakala	NEAT	·	2.3 km	MPC · JPL
624260	2002 QM_{86}	—	August 17, 2002	Palomar	NEAT	·	940 m	MPC · JPL
624261	2002 QY_{90}	—	August 30, 2002	Palomar	NEAT	(5)	930 m	MPC · JPL
624262	2002 QN_{95}	—	August 30, 2002	Palomar	NEAT	·	1.2 km	MPC · JPL
624263	2002 QF_{99}	—	August 19, 2002	Palomar	NEAT	ERI	1.0 km	MPC · JPL
624264	2002 QL_{99}	—	August 18, 2002	Palomar	NEAT	·	900 m	MPC · JPL
624265	2002 QO_{99}	—	August 18, 2002	Palomar	NEAT	·	730 m	MPC · JPL
624266	2002 QN_{101}	—	August 28, 2002	Palomar	NEAT	NYS	580 m	MPC · JPL
624267	2002 QA_{109}	—	August 30, 2002	Kitt Peak	Spacewatch	·	800 m	MPC · JPL
624268	2002 QC_{111}	—	August 17, 2002	Palomar	NEAT	·	780 m	MPC · JPL
624269	2002 QG_{111}	—	August 6, 2002	Palomar	NEAT	·	760 m	MPC · JPL
624270	2002 QR_{111}	—	August 27, 2002	Palomar	NEAT	·	2.8 km	MPC · JPL
624271	2002 QC_{114}	—	August 8, 2002	Anderson Mesa	LONEOS	·	730 m	MPC · JPL
624272	2002 QJ_{114}	—	August 28, 2002	Palomar	NEAT	·	540 m	MPC · JPL
624273	2002 QW_{115}	—	November 16, 2006	Kitt Peak	Spacewatch	MAS	550 m	MPC · JPL
624274	2002 QK_{116}	—	August 18, 2002	Palomar	NEAT	MIS	2.4 km	MPC · JPL
624275	2002 QO_{118}	—	August 30, 2002	Palomar	NEAT	·	960 m	MPC · JPL
624276	2002 QG_{121}	—	August 16, 2002	Palomar	NEAT	·	2.0 km	MPC · JPL
624277	2002 QB_{124}	—	August 19, 2002	Palomar	NEAT	·	720 m	MPC · JPL
624278	2002 QQ_{124}	—	August 16, 2002	Palomar	NEAT	ADE	1.5 km	MPC · JPL
624279	2002 QE_{131}	—	August 30, 2002	Palomar	NEAT	·	670 m	MPC · JPL
624280	2002 QD_{133}	—	August 6, 2002	Palomar	NEAT	·	1.1 km	MPC · JPL
624281	2002 QM_{135}	—	August 30, 2002	Palomar	NEAT	·	1.0 km	MPC · JPL
624282	2002 QX_{135}	—	February 2, 2008	Mount Lemmon	Mount Lemmon Survey	·	960 m	MPC · JPL
624283	2002 QS_{136}	—	August 28, 2002	Palomar	NEAT	·	740 m	MPC · JPL
624284	2002 QD_{139}	—	August 17, 2002	Palomar	NEAT	EMA	2.7 km	MPC · JPL
624285	2002 QM_{141}	—	September 20, 2009	Mount Lemmon	Mount Lemmon Survey	·	510 m	MPC · JPL
624286	2002 QK_{142}	—	August 22, 2006	Palomar	NEAT	·	960 m	MPC · JPL
624287	2002 QR_{142}	—	August 27, 2002	Palomar	NEAT	·	2.9 km	MPC · JPL
624288	2002 QS_{143}	—	October 8, 2008	Mount Lemmon	Mount Lemmon Survey	·	2.5 km	MPC · JPL
624289	2002 QD_{144}	—	August 27, 2002	Palomar	NEAT	·	560 m	MPC · JPL
624290	2002 QZ_{144}	—	October 23, 2009	Mount Lemmon	Mount Lemmon Survey	·	620 m	MPC · JPL
624291	2002 QV_{145}	—	August 17, 2002	Palomar	NEAT	·	880 m	MPC · JPL
624292	2002 QK_{149}	—	August 6, 2002	Palomar	NEAT	·	1.2 km	MPC · JPL
624293	2002 QO_{150}	—	October 22, 2008	Mount Lemmon	Mount Lemmon Survey	·	2.5 km	MPC · JPL
624294	2002 QG_{152}	—	August 28, 2002	Palomar	NEAT	ADE	1.1 km	MPC · JPL
624295	2002 QG_{154}	—	August 15, 2002	Palomar	NEAT	·	2.7 km	MPC · JPL
624296	2002 QH_{154}	—	August 13, 2002	Kitt Peak	Spacewatch	·	1.4 km	MPC · JPL
624297	2002 QQ_{157}	—	November 1, 2013	Mount Lemmon	Mount Lemmon Survey	·	770 m	MPC · JPL
624298	2002 QD_{159}	—	November 1, 2013	Haleakala	Pan-STARRS 1	·	810 m	MPC · JPL
624299	2002 RA_{120}	—	September 9, 2002	Haleakala	NEAT	(1547)	1.4 km	MPC · JPL
624300	2002 RL_{125}	—	September 3, 2002	Palomar	NEAT	·	1.1 km	MPC · JPL

== 624301–624400 ==
back to top

Designation			Discovery			Properties		Ref
Permanent	Provisional	Named after	Date	Site	Discoverer(s)	Category	Diam.	Ref
624301	2002 RU_{137}	—	September 12, 2002	Palomar	NEAT	PHO	830 m	MPC · JPL
624302	2002 RT_{140}	—	September 9, 2002	Haleakala	NEAT	·	1.2 km	MPC · JPL
624303	2002 RZ_{140}	—	September 10, 2002	Palomar	NEAT	·	680 m	MPC · JPL
624304	2002 RO_{142}	—	September 11, 2002	Palomar	NEAT	·	680 m	MPC · JPL
624305	2002 RX_{149}	—	September 11, 2002	Haleakala	NEAT	·	1.2 km	MPC · JPL
624306	2002 RV_{151}	—	September 12, 2002	Palomar	NEAT	·	1.5 km	MPC · JPL
624307	2002 RN_{173}	—	October 28, 1995	Kitt Peak	Spacewatch	·	540 m	MPC · JPL
624308	2002 RA_{177}	—	September 6, 2002	Socorro	LINEAR	EUN	880 m	MPC · JPL
624309	2002 RH_{177}	—	September 6, 2002	Socorro	LINEAR	·	770 m	MPC · JPL
624310	2002 RK_{179}	—	September 14, 2002	Kitt Peak	Spacewatch	·	1.0 km	MPC · JPL
624311	2002 RZ_{190}	—	September 13, 2002	Anderson Mesa	LONEOS	·	1.8 km	MPC · JPL
624312	2002 RA_{191}	—	September 13, 2002	Haleakala	NEAT	·	1.7 km	MPC · JPL
624313	2002 RA_{192}	—	September 12, 2002	Palomar	NEAT	·	1.1 km	MPC · JPL
624314	2002 RW_{197}	—	September 23, 1998	Farra d'Isonzo	Osservatorio Astronomico di Farra d'Isonzo	·	1.1 km	MPC · JPL
624315	2002 RP_{206}	—	September 14, 2002	Palomar	NEAT	·	810 m	MPC · JPL
624316	2002 RL_{208}	—	September 13, 2002	Palomar	NEAT	·	760 m	MPC · JPL
624317	2002 RZ_{208}	—	September 14, 2002	Palomar	NEAT	RAF	750 m	MPC · JPL
624318	2002 RF_{210}	—	September 15, 2002	Kitt Peak	Spacewatch	·	820 m	MPC · JPL
624319	2002 RX_{217}	—	September 5, 2002	Socorro	LINEAR	·	650 m	MPC · JPL
624320	2002 RQ_{230}	—	September 10, 2002	Haleakala	NEAT	·	750 m	MPC · JPL
624321	2002 RA_{249}	—	September 14, 2002	Palomar	NEAT	·	660 m	MPC · JPL
624322	2002 RV_{249}	—	October 11, 2002	Apache Point	SDSS Collaboration	·	960 m	MPC · JPL
624323	2002 RX_{249}	—	September 13, 2002	Palomar	NEAT	·	900 m	MPC · JPL
624324	2002 RG_{251}	—	August 6, 2002	Campo Imperatore	CINEOS	·	500 m	MPC · JPL
624325	2002 RT_{251}	—	September 11, 2002	Palomar	NEAT	·	880 m	MPC · JPL
624326	2002 RQ_{253}	—	October 11, 2002	Apache Point	SDSS Collaboration	·	710 m	MPC · JPL
624327	2002 RU_{256}	—	September 12, 2002	Palomar	NEAT	·	2.0 km	MPC · JPL
624328	2002 RD_{260}	—	September 15, 2002	Palomar	NEAT	·	840 m	MPC · JPL
624329	2002 RZ_{261}	—	September 13, 2002	Palomar	NEAT	·	990 m	MPC · JPL
624330	2002 RT_{262}	—	September 13, 2002	Palomar	NEAT	(5)	870 m	MPC · JPL
624331	2002 RC_{270}	—	September 4, 2002	Palomar	NEAT	·	540 m	MPC · JPL
624332	2002 RW_{275}	—	September 12, 2002	Palomar	NEAT	·	890 m	MPC · JPL
624333	2002 RJ_{276}	—	September 5, 2002	Apache Point	SDSS	NYS	710 m	MPC · JPL
624334	2002 RW_{276}	—	November 17, 1998	Kitt Peak	Spacewatch	MIS	1.8 km	MPC · JPL
624335	2002 RM_{284}	—	September 12, 2002	Palomar	NEAT	LIX	2.7 km	MPC · JPL
624336	2002 RP_{290}	—	November 19, 2007	Mount Lemmon	Mount Lemmon Survey	·	1.3 km	MPC · JPL
624337	2002 RV_{290}	—	August 19, 2009	Catalina	CSS	·	810 m	MPC · JPL
624338	2002 RG_{291}	—	September 9, 2002	Palomar	NEAT	·	1.1 km	MPC · JPL
624339	2002 RZ_{291}	—	September 15, 2002	Haleakala	NEAT	·	1.3 km	MPC · JPL
624340	2002 RX_{292}	—	November 3, 2011	Kitt Peak	Spacewatch	·	1.2 km	MPC · JPL
624341	2002 RB_{294}	—	October 24, 2008	Catalina	CSS	THB	2.3 km	MPC · JPL
624342	2002 RB_{295}	—	September 1, 2002	Palomar	NEAT	·	1.1 km	MPC · JPL
624343	2002 RO_{295}	—	September 3, 2002	Palomar	NEAT	THB	2.4 km	MPC · JPL
624344	2002 RQ_{295}	—	September 4, 2002	Palomar	NEAT	T_{j} (2.98)	2.6 km	MPC · JPL
624345	2002 RJ_{296}	—	December 3, 2013	Mount Lemmon	Mount Lemmon Survey	ERI	1 km	MPC · JPL
624346	2002 RW_{299}	—	August 27, 2009	Kitt Peak	Spacewatch	·	500 m	MPC · JPL
624347	2002 RN_{301}	—	February 8, 2011	Mount Lemmon	Mount Lemmon Survey	·	700 m	MPC · JPL
624348	2002 SU_{4}	—	September 27, 2002	Palomar	NEAT	·	640 m	MPC · JPL
624349	2002 SA_{28}	—	September 30, 2002	Haleakala	NEAT	·	570 m	MPC · JPL
624350	2002 SY_{64}	—	September 16, 2002	Palomar	NEAT	·	530 m	MPC · JPL
624351	2002 SS_{65}	—	September 16, 2002	Palomar	NEAT	·	1.3 km	MPC · JPL
624352	2002 SV_{65}	—	September 16, 2002	Palomar	NEAT	·	580 m	MPC · JPL
624353	2002 SE_{67}	—	September 6, 2002	Socorro	LINEAR	·	940 m	MPC · JPL
624354	2002 SB_{68}	—	October 10, 2002	Apache Point	SDSS	·	1.4 km	MPC · JPL
624355	2002 SJ_{68}	—	October 5, 2002	Apache Point	SDSS Collaboration	MIS	1.8 km	MPC · JPL
624356	2002 SG_{70}	—	October 30, 2002	Apache Point	SDSS Collaboration	·	830 m	MPC · JPL
624357	2002 SD_{75}	—	February 26, 2014	Haleakala	Pan-STARRS 1	H	370 m	MPC · JPL
624358	2002 TU_{12}	—	September 26, 2002	Palomar	NEAT	(5)	1.1 km	MPC · JPL
624359	2002 TT_{18}	—	August 12, 2002	Cerro Tololo	Deep Ecliptic Survey	·	2.4 km	MPC · JPL
624360	2002 TG_{21}	—	October 2, 2002	Socorro	LINEAR	·	740 m	MPC · JPL
624361	2002 TZ_{33}	—	October 2, 2002	Socorro	LINEAR	·	1.4 km	MPC · JPL
624362	2002 TG_{56}	—	October 3, 2002	Campo Imperatore	CINEOS	·	860 m	MPC · JPL
624363	2002 TZ_{60}	—	October 3, 2002	Palomar	NEAT	·	1.3 km	MPC · JPL
624364	2002 TT_{64}	—	September 28, 2002	Haleakala	NEAT	·	1.2 km	MPC · JPL
624365	2002 TX_{86}	—	October 3, 2002	Socorro	LINEAR	MIS	2.0 km	MPC · JPL
624366	2002 TA_{89}	—	October 3, 2002	Palomar	NEAT	PHO	630 m	MPC · JPL
624367	2002 TF_{95}	—	October 3, 2002	Socorro	LINEAR	·	1.2 km	MPC · JPL
624368	2002 TK_{106}	—	October 4, 2002	Palomar	NEAT	·	1.3 km	MPC · JPL
624369	2002 TC_{120}	—	October 3, 2002	Palomar	NEAT	·	710 m	MPC · JPL
624370	2002 TM_{132}	—	September 28, 2002	Haleakala	NEAT	·	890 m	MPC · JPL
624371	2002 TN_{141}	—	October 3, 2002	Socorro	LINEAR	PHO	700 m	MPC · JPL
624372	2002 TV_{141}	—	October 5, 2002	Palomar	NEAT	·	880 m	MPC · JPL
624373	2002 TL_{152}	—	October 5, 2002	Palomar	NEAT	·	700 m	MPC · JPL
624374	2002 TS_{166}	—	October 3, 2002	Palomar	NEAT	·	1.3 km	MPC · JPL
624375	2002 TX_{176}	—	October 5, 2002	Palomar	NEAT	EUN	1.1 km	MPC · JPL
624376	2002 TV_{187}	—	October 4, 2002	Socorro	LINEAR	·	850 m	MPC · JPL
624377	2002 TK_{197}	—	September 6, 2002	Socorro	LINEAR	·	1.2 km	MPC · JPL
624378	2002 TA_{257}	—	October 9, 2002	Socorro	LINEAR	·	1.1 km	MPC · JPL
624379	2002 TM_{260}	—	September 28, 2002	Palomar	NEAT	·	1.8 km	MPC · JPL
624380	2002 TO_{271}	—	October 3, 2002	Socorro	LINEAR	·	730 m	MPC · JPL
624381	2002 TB_{294}	—	October 3, 2002	Socorro	LINEAR	·	1.1 km	MPC · JPL
624382	2002 TN_{296}	—	October 2, 2002	Haleakala	NEAT	·	690 m	MPC · JPL
624383	2002 TH_{379}	—	September 13, 2002	Palomar	NEAT	·	830 m	MPC · JPL
624384	2002 TL_{384}	—	October 8, 2002	Palomar	NEAT	·	1.4 km	MPC · JPL
624385	2002 TA_{385}	—	October 5, 2002	Apache Point	SDSS Collaboration	·	1.4 km	MPC · JPL
624386	2002 TH_{386}	—	October 6, 2002	Palomar	NEAT	·	950 m	MPC · JPL
624387	2002 TU_{386}	—	October 8, 2002	Palomar	NEAT	·	2.3 km	MPC · JPL
624388	2002 TZ_{389}	—	September 22, 2009	Mount Lemmon	Mount Lemmon Survey	·	620 m	MPC · JPL
624389	2002 TU_{390}	—	October 17, 2011	Kitt Peak	Spacewatch	·	1.2 km	MPC · JPL
624390	2002 TH_{391}	—	July 14, 2013	Haleakala	Pan-STARRS 1	·	2.6 km	MPC · JPL
624391	2002 TS_{391}	—	December 28, 2011	Mount Lemmon	Mount Lemmon Survey	·	960 m	MPC · JPL
624392	2002 TY_{391}	—	December 17, 2007	Mount Lemmon	Mount Lemmon Survey	·	1.2 km	MPC · JPL
624393	2002 TH_{393}	—	August 12, 2002	Cerro Tololo	Deep Ecliptic Survey	·	1.3 km	MPC · JPL
624394	2002 TK_{393}	—	October 22, 2009	Mount Lemmon	Mount Lemmon Survey	·	600 m	MPC · JPL
624395	2002 TP_{393}	—	October 5, 2002	Palomar	NEAT	·	1.4 km	MPC · JPL
624396	2002 UB_{17}	—	October 29, 2002	Palomar	NEAT	·	1.2 km	MPC · JPL
624397	2002 UA_{24}	—	October 11, 2002	Palomar	NEAT	·	800 m	MPC · JPL
624398	2002 UZ_{29}	—	October 30, 2002	Kitt Peak	Spacewatch	MIS	2.0 km	MPC · JPL
624399	2002 UD_{30}	—	October 30, 2002	Kitt Peak	Spacewatch	NYS	680 m	MPC · JPL
624400	2002 UY_{69}	—	October 31, 2002	Needville	J. Dellinger, W. G. Dillon	·	1.5 km	MPC · JPL

== 624401–624500 ==
back to top

Designation			Discovery			Properties		Ref
Permanent	Provisional	Named after	Date	Site	Discoverer(s)	Category	Diam.	Ref
624401	2002 UU_{72}	—	October 30, 2002	Haleakala	NEAT	·	1.4 km	MPC · JPL
624402	2002 UE_{75}	—	November 11, 2002	Kitt Peak	Spacewatch	·	1.2 km	MPC · JPL
624403	2002 UQ_{79}	—	October 4, 2002	Campo Imperatore	CINEOS	·	1.5 km	MPC · JPL
624404	2002 UG_{80}	—	January 24, 2007	Kitt Peak	Spacewatch	·	830 m	MPC · JPL
624405	2002 UP_{81}	—	October 3, 2013	Kitt Peak	Spacewatch	·	2.3 km	MPC · JPL
624406	2002 UB_{82}	—	October 3, 2014	Mount Lemmon	Mount Lemmon Survey	L5	7.9 km	MPC · JPL
624407	2002 VZ	—	November 2, 2002	Wrightwood	J. W. Young	·	450 m	MPC · JPL
624408	2002 VP_{7}	—	October 6, 2002	Socorro	LINEAR	·	1.6 km	MPC · JPL
624409	2002 VG_{37}	—	October 9, 2002	Palomar	NEAT	·	1.4 km	MPC · JPL
624410	2002 VL_{45}	—	October 4, 2002	Socorro	LINEAR	·	1.4 km	MPC · JPL
624411	2002 VV_{72}	—	November 7, 2002	Socorro	LINEAR	·	2.4 km	MPC · JPL
624412	2002 VC_{93}	—	November 11, 2002	Socorro	LINEAR	·	2.1 km	MPC · JPL
624413	2002 VX_{105}	—	November 12, 2002	Socorro	LINEAR	·	1.2 km	MPC · JPL
624414	2002 VZ_{115}	—	November 11, 2002	Socorro	LINEAR	EOS	2.7 km	MPC · JPL
624415	2002 VX_{116}	—	November 13, 2002	Palomar	NEAT	·	1.5 km	MPC · JPL
624416	2002 VE_{134}	—	November 6, 2002	Socorro	LINEAR	·	2.9 km	MPC · JPL
624417	2002 VG_{137}	—	November 5, 2002	Mount Nyukasa	National Aerospace Laboratory of Japan	·	830 m	MPC · JPL
624418	2002 VL_{137}	—	November 13, 2002	Kitt Peak	Spacewatch	·	560 m	MPC · JPL
624419	2002 VO_{144}	—	November 4, 2002	Palomar	NEAT	NYS	630 m	MPC · JPL
624420	2002 VV_{144}	—	November 4, 2002	Palomar	NEAT	L5	9.4 km	MPC · JPL
624421	2002 VZ_{145}	—	November 5, 2002	Palomar	NEAT	·	780 m	MPC · JPL
624422	2002 VU_{146}	—	November 4, 2002	Palomar	NEAT	·	740 m	MPC · JPL
624423	2002 VV_{147}	—	July 18, 2006	Mount Lemmon	Mount Lemmon Survey	·	940 m	MPC · JPL
624424	2002 VD_{149}	—	September 26, 2006	Catalina	CSS	·	910 m	MPC · JPL
624425	2002 VR_{149}	—	December 3, 2002	Palomar	NEAT	TIR	2.3 km	MPC · JPL
624426	2002 VF_{150}	—	December 2, 2008	Mount Lemmon	Mount Lemmon Survey	·	2.7 km	MPC · JPL
624427	2002 VK_{150}	—	November 7, 2002	Kitt Peak	Deep Ecliptic Survey	·	1.1 km	MPC · JPL
624428	2002 VN_{150}	—	March 8, 2005	Mount Lemmon	Mount Lemmon Survey	·	2.5 km	MPC · JPL
624429	2002 VF_{152}	—	September 16, 2006	Catalina	CSS	EUN	1.1 km	MPC · JPL
624430	2002 VR_{152}	—	March 10, 2005	Mount Lemmon	Mount Lemmon Survey	PHO	870 m	MPC · JPL
624431	2002 VZ_{153}	—	December 1, 2008	Kitt Peak	Spacewatch	·	2.3 km	MPC · JPL
624432	2002 VH_{154}	—	August 23, 2011	Haleakala	Pan-STARRS 1	AEO	780 m	MPC · JPL
624433	2002 WF_{5}	—	November 24, 2002	Palomar	NEAT	·	2.9 km	MPC · JPL
624434	2002 WQ_{22}	—	November 24, 2002	Palomar	NEAT	·	1.2 km	MPC · JPL
624435	2002 WC_{23}	—	November 24, 2002	Palomar	NEAT	·	1.1 km	MPC · JPL
624436	2002 WG_{23}	—	November 24, 2002	Palomar	NEAT	V	720 m	MPC · JPL
624437	2002 WF_{26}	—	November 23, 2002	Palomar	NEAT	·	3.0 km	MPC · JPL
624438	2002 WB_{27}	—	October 31, 2002	Kitt Peak	Spacewatch	·	1.1 km	MPC · JPL
624439	2002 WF_{27}	—	September 17, 2006	Catalina	CSS	·	880 m	MPC · JPL
624440	2002 XQ_{4}	—	December 3, 2002	Palomar	NEAT	·	1.2 km	MPC · JPL
624441	2002 XK_{27}	—	December 5, 2002	Socorro	LINEAR	·	3.2 km	MPC · JPL
624442	2002 XX_{45}	—	December 5, 2002	Socorro	LINEAR	·	2.0 km	MPC · JPL
624443	2002 XK_{97}	—	December 5, 2002	Haleakala	NEAT	·	960 m	MPC · JPL
624444	2002 XN_{97}	—	December 5, 2002	Socorro	LINEAR	·	830 m	MPC · JPL
624445	2002 XN_{122}	—	December 10, 2015	Mount Lemmon	Mount Lemmon Survey	H	550 m	MPC · JPL
624446	2002 YB_{8}	—	December 1, 2002	Haleakala	NEAT	·	2.0 km	MPC · JPL
624447	2003 AB_{39}	—	December 5, 2002	Kitt Peak	Spacewatch	·	2.9 km	MPC · JPL
624448 Gennadiyborisov	2003 AJ_{95}	Gennadiyborisov	December 30, 2013	Nogales	J.-C. Merlin	·	1.0 km	MPC · JPL
624449	2003 AM_{95}	—	December 29, 2011	Kitt Peak	Spacewatch	·	1.7 km	MPC · JPL
624450	2003 BA_{95}	—	September 29, 2008	Kitt Peak	Spacewatch	3:2	4.1 km	MPC · JPL
624451	2003 BV_{97}	—	October 30, 2010	Catalina	CSS	·	1.4 km	MPC · JPL
624452	2003 BZ_{98}	—	June 28, 2014	Haleakala	Pan-STARRS 1	·	1.4 km	MPC · JPL
624453	2003 BH_{100}	—	November 21, 2007	Mount Lemmon	Mount Lemmon Survey	·	2.5 km	MPC · JPL
624454	2003 BT_{100}	—	October 4, 2012	Haleakala	Pan-STARRS 1	V	450 m	MPC · JPL
624455	2003 BJ_{101}	—	February 10, 2014	Haleakala	Pan-STARRS 1	MAS	600 m	MPC · JPL
624456	2003 BP_{102}	—	October 16, 2012	Mount Lemmon	Mount Lemmon Survey	·	2.6 km	MPC · JPL
624457	2003 CW_{26}	—	April 18, 2007	Kitt Peak	Spacewatch	·	840 m	MPC · JPL
624458	2003 CG_{27}	—	February 1, 2003	Kitt Peak	Spacewatch	·	870 m	MPC · JPL
624459	2003 DN_{25}	—	February 21, 2003	Palomar	NEAT	H	450 m	MPC · JPL
624460	2003 DT_{25}	—	February 22, 2003	Palomar	NEAT	PHO	750 m	MPC · JPL
624461	2003 EV_{46}	—	March 8, 2003	Kitt Peak	Spacewatch	·	870 m	MPC · JPL
624462	2003 EJ_{54}	—	March 7, 2003	Kitt Peak	Deep Lens Survey	·	790 m	MPC · JPL
624463	2003 EC_{64}	—	August 21, 2009	La Sagra	OAM	·	2.1 km	MPC · JPL
624464	2003 EQ_{64}	—	October 28, 2005	Kitt Peak	Spacewatch	MAS	520 m	MPC · JPL
624465	2003 FV_{134}	—	April 22, 2007	Mount Lemmon	Mount Lemmon Survey	NYS	1.1 km	MPC · JPL
624466	2003 FT_{135}	—	October 8, 2012	Mount Lemmon	Mount Lemmon Survey	·	1.1 km	MPC · JPL
624467	2003 FD_{136}	—	September 19, 2017	Haleakala	Pan-STARRS 1	·	2.0 km	MPC · JPL
624468	2003 FJ_{136}	—	October 29, 2005	Kitt Peak	Spacewatch	·	890 m	MPC · JPL
624469	2003 FQ_{137}	—	September 11, 2004	Kitt Peak	Spacewatch	·	350 m	MPC · JPL
624470	2003 FL_{138}	—	July 19, 2015	Haleakala	Pan-STARRS 2	·	980 m	MPC · JPL
624471	2003 FQ_{139}	—	May 29, 2003	Cerro Tololo	Deep Ecliptic Survey	·	950 m	MPC · JPL
624472	2003 GW_{29}	—	April 8, 2003	Kitt Peak	Spacewatch	H	380 m	MPC · JPL
624473	2003 GY_{29}	—	April 8, 2003	Kitt Peak	Spacewatch	·	920 m	MPC · JPL
624474	2003 GJ_{45}	—	April 9, 2003	Kitt Peak	Spacewatch	·	1.0 km	MPC · JPL
624475	2003 GV_{58}	—	May 6, 2008	Mount Lemmon	Mount Lemmon Survey	·	2.1 km	MPC · JPL
624476	2003 GP_{60}	—	April 1, 2003	Apache Point	SDSS Collaboration	LIX	2.8 km	MPC · JPL
624477	2003 GY_{61}	—	April 8, 2003	Kitt Peak	Spacewatch	·	1.1 km	MPC · JPL
624478	2003 GM_{63}	—	March 26, 2014	Mount Lemmon	Mount Lemmon Survey	·	2.4 km	MPC · JPL
624479	2003 GU_{64}	—	May 9, 2014	Haleakala	Pan-STARRS 1	·	2.1 km	MPC · JPL
624480	2003 HR_{35}	—	March 27, 2003	Kitt Peak	Spacewatch	·	2.0 km	MPC · JPL
624481	2003 HV_{42}	—	April 30, 2003	Socorro	LINEAR	·	1.4 km	MPC · JPL
624482	2003 HH_{60}	—	September 17, 2010	Mount Lemmon	Mount Lemmon Survey	EOS	1.5 km	MPC · JPL
624483	2003 HU_{60}	—	October 11, 2012	Haleakala	Pan-STARRS 1	·	1.0 km	MPC · JPL
624484	2003 HS_{63}	—	April 25, 2003	Apache Point	SDSS Collaboration	·	1.8 km	MPC · JPL
624485	2003 HB_{64}	—	April 9, 2014	Mount Lemmon	Mount Lemmon Survey	·	2.3 km	MPC · JPL
624486	2003 HJ_{65}	—	April 26, 2003	Kitt Peak	Spacewatch	·	740 m	MPC · JPL
624487	2003 JD_{20}	—	April 5, 2017	Haleakala	Pan-STARRS 1	·	1.8 km	MPC · JPL
624488	2003 JO_{20}	—	October 8, 2012	Mount Lemmon	Mount Lemmon Survey	·	840 m	MPC · JPL
624489	2003 JX_{20}	—	May 1, 2003	Kitt Peak	Spacewatch	·	500 m	MPC · JPL
624490	2003 JA_{21}	—	May 5, 2003	Kitt Peak	Spacewatch	JUN	570 m	MPC · JPL
624491	2003 KV_{37}	—	March 5, 2006	Kitt Peak	Spacewatch	·	460 m	MPC · JPL
624492	2003 LN_{3}	—	June 4, 2003	Kitt Peak	Spacewatch	·	1.1 km	MPC · JPL
624493	2003 LH_{11}	—	September 9, 2007	Kitt Peak	Spacewatch	·	350 m	MPC · JPL
624494	2003 LS_{11}	—	November 26, 2005	Kitt Peak	Spacewatch	·	1.5 km	MPC · JPL
624495	2003 LA_{12}	—	June 1, 2003	Cerro Tololo	Deep Ecliptic Survey	·	960 m	MPC · JPL
624496	2003 NU_{3}	—	July 3, 2003	Kitt Peak	Spacewatch	·	970 m	MPC · JPL
624497	2003 NA_{9}	—	July 9, 2003	Kitt Peak	Spacewatch	MAR	920 m	MPC · JPL
624498	2003 OJ_{21}	—	July 26, 2003	Socorro	LINEAR	·	2.0 km	MPC · JPL
624499	2003 OD_{26}	—	July 9, 2003	Kitt Peak	Spacewatch	·	2.3 km	MPC · JPL
624500	2003 QP_{29}	—	July 24, 2003	Palomar	NEAT	·	1.0 km	MPC · JPL

== 624501–624600 ==
back to top

Designation			Discovery			Properties		Ref
Permanent	Provisional	Named after	Date	Site	Discoverer(s)	Category	Diam.	Ref
624501	2003 QT_{34}	—	August 4, 2003	Kitt Peak	Spacewatch	(5)	1.0 km	MPC · JPL
624502	2003 QR_{73}	—	August 21, 2003	Palomar	NEAT	T_{j} (2.97)	2.6 km	MPC · JPL
624503	2003 QX_{102}	—	August 31, 2003	Socorro	LINEAR	·	600 m	MPC · JPL
624504	2003 QG_{110}	—	August 24, 2003	Cerro Tololo	Deep Ecliptic Survey	·	1.3 km	MPC · JPL
624505	2003 QR_{115}	—	August 21, 2003	Mauna Kea	D. D. Balam, K. M. Perrett	·	1.6 km	MPC · JPL
624506	2003 QY_{115}	—	August 21, 2003	Mauna Kea	D. D. Balam, K. M. Perrett	EOS	1.1 km	MPC · JPL
624507	2003 QE_{122}	—	August 23, 2003	Palomar	NEAT	·	1.1 km	MPC · JPL
624508	2003 QM_{123}	—	August 28, 2003	Palomar	NEAT	·	500 m	MPC · JPL
624509	2003 QO_{124}	—	September 19, 2014	Haleakala	Pan-STARRS 1	·	1.4 km	MPC · JPL
624510	2003 QT_{124}	—	August 26, 2003	Cerro Tololo	Deep Ecliptic Survey	MIS	1.8 km	MPC · JPL
624511	2003 QB_{125}	—	August 25, 2003	Palomar	NEAT	TIR	2.0 km	MPC · JPL
624512	2003 RW_{14}	—	August 23, 2003	Palomar	NEAT	·	1.5 km	MPC · JPL
624513	2003 SG_{9}	—	September 17, 2003	Palomar	NEAT	·	1.0 km	MPC · JPL
624514	2003 SQ_{19}	—	September 16, 2003	Kitt Peak	Spacewatch	·	1.6 km	MPC · JPL
624515	2003 SC_{28}	—	September 18, 2003	Palomar	NEAT	T_{j} (2.96)	2.9 km	MPC · JPL
624516	2003 SD_{35}	—	September 18, 2003	Kitt Peak	Spacewatch	THM	2.0 km	MPC · JPL
624517	2003 SN_{47}	—	September 3, 2003	Socorro	LINEAR	·	610 m	MPC · JPL
624518	2003 SX_{70}	—	September 18, 2003	Kitt Peak	Spacewatch	PHO	580 m	MPC · JPL
624519	2003 SE_{105}	—	September 21, 2003	Socorro	LINEAR	H	480 m	MPC · JPL
624520	2003 SV_{114}	—	September 16, 2003	Kitt Peak	Spacewatch	·	580 m	MPC · JPL
624521	2003 SU_{161}	—	September 18, 2003	Palomar	NEAT	H	460 m	MPC · JPL
624522	2003 SW_{170}	—	September 22, 2003	Uccle	T. Pauwels	·	1.1 km	MPC · JPL
624523	2003 SU_{175}	—	September 18, 2003	Palomar	NEAT	H	490 m	MPC · JPL
624524	2003 SV_{182}	—	September 20, 2003	Campo Imperatore	CINEOS	·	460 m	MPC · JPL
624525	2003 SM_{190}	—	September 21, 2003	Anderson Mesa	LONEOS	JUN	800 m	MPC · JPL
624526	2003 SC_{197}	—	September 22, 2003	Socorro	LINEAR	·	1.3 km	MPC · JPL
624527	2003 SH_{202}	—	September 22, 2003	Anderson Mesa	LONEOS	T_{j} (2.97)	3.3 km	MPC · JPL
624528	2003 SS_{210}	—	August 20, 2003	Palomar	NEAT	·	790 m	MPC · JPL
624529	2003 SM_{230}	—	September 24, 2003	Palomar	NEAT	·	710 m	MPC · JPL
624530	2003 SA_{240}	—	September 27, 2003	Kitt Peak	Spacewatch	ELF	2.1 km	MPC · JPL
624531	2003 SP_{253}	—	September 6, 2003	Campo Imperatore	CINEOS	·	2.9 km	MPC · JPL
624532	2003 SJ_{264}	—	September 28, 2003	Socorro	LINEAR	·	640 m	MPC · JPL
624533	2003 SW_{273}	—	September 19, 2003	Anderson Mesa	LONEOS	·	600 m	MPC · JPL
624534	2003 SS_{280}	—	September 18, 2003	Kitt Peak	Spacewatch	·	2.1 km	MPC · JPL
624535	2003 SV_{283}	—	September 20, 2003	Socorro	LINEAR	·	1.6 km	MPC · JPL
624536	2003 SW_{286}	—	September 22, 2003	Anderson Mesa	LONEOS	(5)	950 m	MPC · JPL
624537	2003 SU_{295}	—	September 30, 2003	Socorro	LINEAR	·	2.2 km	MPC · JPL
624538	2003 SV_{309}	—	September 27, 2003	Kitt Peak	Spacewatch	·	610 m	MPC · JPL
624539	2003 SN_{312}	—	August 23, 2003	Palomar	NEAT	·	970 m	MPC · JPL
624540	2003 SO_{313}	—	September 20, 2003	Palomar	NEAT	·	1.1 km	MPC · JPL
624541	2003 SH_{326}	—	September 18, 2003	Kitt Peak	Spacewatch	·	1.7 km	MPC · JPL
624542	2003 SV_{326}	—	September 18, 2003	Kitt Peak	Spacewatch	·	1.6 km	MPC · JPL
624543	2003 SV_{329}	—	September 23, 2003	Palomar	NEAT	·	1.1 km	MPC · JPL
624544	2003 SB_{334}	—	September 22, 2003	Kitt Peak	Spacewatch	·	470 m	MPC · JPL
624545	2003 ST_{335}	—	October 20, 2003	Kitt Peak	Spacewatch	·	790 m	MPC · JPL
624546	2003 SZ_{335}	—	October 21, 2003	Palomar	NEAT	·	2.2 km	MPC · JPL
624547	2003 SP_{336}	—	October 20, 2003	Kitt Peak	Spacewatch	·	490 m	MPC · JPL
624548	2003 SQ_{339}	—	September 26, 2003	Apache Point	SDSS Collaboration	·	620 m	MPC · JPL
624549	2003 SB_{350}	—	September 18, 2003	Palomar	NEAT	·	990 m	MPC · JPL
624550	2003 SQ_{352}	—	September 19, 2003	Campo Imperatore	CINEOS	·	2.1 km	MPC · JPL
624551	2003 ST_{354}	—	September 17, 2003	Kitt Peak	Spacewatch	BAR	980 m	MPC · JPL
624552	2003 SQ_{362}	—	September 22, 2003	Kitt Peak	Spacewatch	·	920 m	MPC · JPL
624553	2003 SJ_{363}	—	September 22, 2003	Kitt Peak	Spacewatch	·	490 m	MPC · JPL
624554	2003 SO_{363}	—	September 22, 2003	Kitt Peak	Spacewatch	H	350 m	MPC · JPL
624555	2003 SW_{373}	—	September 26, 2003	Apache Point	SDSS Collaboration	·	580 m	MPC · JPL
624556	2003 SE_{377}	—	April 4, 2005	Mount Lemmon	Mount Lemmon Survey	·	600 m	MPC · JPL
624557	2003 SY_{389}	—	September 26, 2003	Apache Point	SDSS Collaboration	·	530 m	MPC · JPL
624558	2003 SM_{394}	—	September 26, 2003	Apache Point	SDSS	·	610 m	MPC · JPL
624559	2003 SL_{395}	—	September 26, 2003	Apache Point	SDSS Collaboration	·	1.9 km	MPC · JPL
624560	2003 SB_{396}	—	October 20, 2003	Kitt Peak	Spacewatch	·	550 m	MPC · JPL
624561	2003 SL_{396}	—	September 28, 2003	Anderson Mesa	LONEOS	·	1.1 km	MPC · JPL
624562	2003 SU_{396}	—	September 26, 2003	Apache Point	SDSS Collaboration	·	1.7 km	MPC · JPL
624563	2003 SA_{397}	—	September 26, 2003	Apache Point	SDSS Collaboration	·	710 m	MPC · JPL
624564	2003 SS_{399}	—	September 26, 2003	Apache Point	SDSS Collaboration	·	1.2 km	MPC · JPL
624565	2003 SH_{405}	—	September 27, 2003	Apache Point	SDSS Collaboration	·	2.4 km	MPC · JPL
624566	2003 SJ_{416}	—	September 18, 2003	Palomar	NEAT	·	2.4 km	MPC · JPL
624567	2003 SZ_{419}	—	September 28, 2003	Apache Point	SDSS Collaboration	·	460 m	MPC · JPL
624568	2003 SV_{431}	—	September 16, 2003	Kitt Peak	Spacewatch	·	940 m	MPC · JPL
624569	2003 SP_{439}	—	September 19, 2003	Kitt Peak	Spacewatch	·	620 m	MPC · JPL
624570	2003 SV_{440}	—	September 15, 2009	Kitt Peak	Spacewatch	·	2.8 km	MPC · JPL
624571	2003 SN_{441}	—	September 22, 2003	Kitt Peak	Spacewatch	·	490 m	MPC · JPL
624572	2003 SW_{444}	—	September 10, 2007	Mount Lemmon	Mount Lemmon Survey	·	950 m	MPC · JPL
624573	2003 SZ_{444}	—	September 20, 2003	Kitt Peak	Spacewatch	·	490 m	MPC · JPL
624574	2003 SE_{446}	—	September 19, 2003	Kitt Peak	Spacewatch	·	510 m	MPC · JPL
624575	2003 SS_{447}	—	September 21, 2003	Kitt Peak	Spacewatch	·	1.1 km	MPC · JPL
624576	2003 SY_{447}	—	September 17, 2003	Kitt Peak	Spacewatch	NYS	510 m	MPC · JPL
624577	2003 SZ_{447}	—	September 16, 2003	Kitt Peak	Spacewatch	(5)	810 m	MPC · JPL
624578	2003 SC_{448}	—	May 9, 2013	Haleakala	Pan-STARRS 1	·	410 m	MPC · JPL
624579	2003 SA_{450}	—	September 21, 2011	Kitt Peak	Spacewatch	T_{j} (2.98) · 3:2	3.9 km	MPC · JPL
624580	2003 SA_{451}	—	July 8, 2018	Haleakala	Pan-STARRS 1	3:2	3.8 km	MPC · JPL
624581	2003 SX_{452}	—	September 14, 2013	Mount Lemmon	Mount Lemmon Survey	·	620 m	MPC · JPL
624582	2003 SD_{453}	—	August 8, 2013	Haleakala	Pan-STARRS 1	·	580 m	MPC · JPL
624583	2003 SH_{453}	—	September 18, 2003	Kitt Peak	Spacewatch	·	1.8 km	MPC · JPL
624584	2003 SQ_{457}	—	April 2, 2009	Kitt Peak	Spacewatch	·	630 m	MPC · JPL
624585	2003 SC_{458}	—	August 31, 2011	Haleakala	Pan-STARRS 1	·	610 m	MPC · JPL
624586	2003 SQ_{458}	—	September 19, 2003	Kitt Peak	Spacewatch	TIR	2.3 km	MPC · JPL
624587	2003 SY_{458}	—	September 21, 2003	Kitt Peak	Spacewatch	·	670 m	MPC · JPL
624588	2003 SV_{459}	—	September 19, 2014	Haleakala	Pan-STARRS 1	THM	1.6 km	MPC · JPL
624589	2003 SO_{460}	—	November 10, 2010	Mount Lemmon	Mount Lemmon Survey	·	450 m	MPC · JPL
624590	2003 SN_{463}	—	July 8, 2014	Haleakala	Pan-STARRS 1	·	2.0 km	MPC · JPL
624591	2003 ST_{465}	—	September 19, 2003	Kitt Peak	Spacewatch	·	990 m	MPC · JPL
624592	2003 SW_{465}	—	September 21, 2003	Kitt Peak	Spacewatch	·	450 m	MPC · JPL
624593	2003 SH_{466}	—	September 25, 2003	Haleakala	NEAT	·	1.1 km	MPC · JPL
624594	2003 SF_{467}	—	September 28, 2003	Kitt Peak	Spacewatch	·	980 m	MPC · JPL
624595	2003 SK_{467}	—	September 16, 2003	Kitt Peak	Spacewatch	·	410 m	MPC · JPL
624596	2003 SW_{467}	—	September 16, 2003	Kitt Peak	Spacewatch	THM	1.8 km	MPC · JPL
624597	2003 SB_{468}	—	September 16, 2003	Kitt Peak	Spacewatch	·	470 m	MPC · JPL
624598	2003 SW_{468}	—	September 18, 2003	Kitt Peak	Spacewatch	·	1.7 km	MPC · JPL
624599	2003 SC_{469}	—	September 16, 2003	Kitt Peak	Spacewatch	·	960 m	MPC · JPL
624600	2003 SV_{475}	—	September 27, 2003	Kitt Peak	Spacewatch	·	1.4 km	MPC · JPL

== 624601–624700 ==
back to top

Designation			Discovery			Properties		Ref
Permanent	Provisional	Named after	Date	Site	Discoverer(s)	Category	Diam.	Ref
624601	2003 TV_{4}	—	October 1, 2003	Kitt Peak	Spacewatch	·	570 m	MPC · JPL
624602	2003 TY_{18}	—	September 30, 2003	Kitt Peak	Spacewatch	(5)	770 m	MPC · JPL
624603	2003 TW_{36}	—	October 1, 2003	Kitt Peak	Spacewatch	·	560 m	MPC · JPL
624604	2003 TB_{42}	—	September 22, 2003	Palomar	NEAT	·	550 m	MPC · JPL
624605	2003 TK_{61}	—	October 5, 2003	Kitt Peak	Spacewatch	·	480 m	MPC · JPL
624606	2003 TC_{62}	—	October 26, 2009	Kitt Peak	Spacewatch	TIR	1.9 km	MPC · JPL
624607	2003 TM_{62}	—	October 3, 2003	Kitt Peak	Spacewatch	·	2.1 km	MPC · JPL
624608	2003 TC_{63}	—	January 27, 2017	Haleakala	Pan-STARRS 1	·	860 m	MPC · JPL
624609	2003 TG_{63}	—	September 16, 2009	Kitt Peak	Spacewatch	·	2.4 km	MPC · JPL
624610	2003 UA	—	October 16, 2003	Kitt Peak	Spacewatch	H	450 m	MPC · JPL
624611	2003 UK_{2}	—	October 16, 2003	Kitt Peak	Spacewatch	·	1.1 km	MPC · JPL
624612	2003 UY_{7}	—	October 19, 2003	Kitt Peak	Spacewatch	H	330 m	MPC · JPL
624613	2003 UR_{9}	—	September 28, 2003	Anderson Mesa	LONEOS	·	2.4 km	MPC · JPL
624614	2003 UP_{11}	—	September 20, 2003	Palomar	NEAT	·	640 m	MPC · JPL
624615	2003 UB_{13}	—	August 25, 2003	Socorro	LINEAR	·	1.3 km	MPC · JPL
624616	2003 UF_{21}	—	October 22, 2003	Socorro	LINEAR	·	1.2 km	MPC · JPL
624617	2003 UX_{38}	—	September 30, 2003	Kitt Peak	Spacewatch	·	470 m	MPC · JPL
624618	2003 UX_{45}	—	September 28, 2003	Kitt Peak	Spacewatch	·	2.3 km	MPC · JPL
624619	2003 UX_{69}	—	October 18, 2003	Kitt Peak	Spacewatch	THM	2.1 km	MPC · JPL
624620	2003 UG_{96}	—	October 18, 2003	Kitt Peak	Spacewatch	(5)	990 m	MPC · JPL
624621	2003 UH_{107}	—	September 21, 2003	Kitt Peak	Spacewatch	·	990 m	MPC · JPL
624622	2003 UU_{127}	—	September 29, 2003	Socorro	LINEAR	·	520 m	MPC · JPL
624623	2003 UL_{152}	—	October 21, 2003	Kitt Peak	Spacewatch	·	1.0 km	MPC · JPL
624624	2003 UT_{153}	—	November 12, 2013	Mount Lemmon	Mount Lemmon Survey	·	640 m	MPC · JPL
624625	2003 UC_{194}	—	September 19, 2003	Anderson Mesa	LONEOS	T_{j} (2.96)	4.0 km	MPC · JPL
624626	2003 UC_{200}	—	September 22, 2003	Kitt Peak	Spacewatch	·	1.0 km	MPC · JPL
624627	2003 UF_{220}	—	October 21, 2003	Palomar	NEAT	(5)	1.1 km	MPC · JPL
624628	2003 UW_{224}	—	October 3, 2003	Kitt Peak	Spacewatch	·	1.0 km	MPC · JPL
624629	2003 UF_{225}	—	October 2, 2003	Kitt Peak	Spacewatch	·	520 m	MPC · JPL
624630	2003 UA_{229}	—	October 18, 2003	Anderson Mesa	LONEOS	·	1.1 km	MPC · JPL
624631	2003 UQ_{245}	—	October 24, 2003	Kitt Peak	Spacewatch	·	550 m	MPC · JPL
624632	2003 UC_{268}	—	October 2, 2003	Kitt Peak	Spacewatch	·	1.7 km	MPC · JPL
624633	2003 UP_{289}	—	September 28, 2003	Kitt Peak	Spacewatch	·	2.4 km	MPC · JPL
624634	2003 UC_{303}	—	October 17, 2003	Kitt Peak	Spacewatch	·	710 m	MPC · JPL
624635	2003 UG_{305}	—	October 18, 2003	Kitt Peak	Spacewatch	EOS	1.5 km	MPC · JPL
624636	2003 UZ_{319}	—	September 20, 2003	Kitt Peak	Spacewatch	·	2.2 km	MPC · JPL
624637	2003 UC_{324}	—	September 16, 2003	Kitt Peak	Spacewatch	·	1.8 km	MPC · JPL
624638	2003 UX_{329}	—	October 17, 2003	Kitt Peak	Spacewatch	·	2.6 km	MPC · JPL
624639	2003 UM_{336}	—	September 29, 2003	Kitt Peak	Spacewatch	·	1.4 km	MPC · JPL
624640	2003 UO_{340}	—	September 19, 2003	Kitt Peak	Spacewatch	·	1.2 km	MPC · JPL
624641	2003 UB_{342}	—	October 19, 2003	Apache Point	SDSS Collaboration	MAR	590 m	MPC · JPL
624642	2003 UD_{344}	—	October 19, 2003	Kitt Peak	Spacewatch	·	460 m	MPC · JPL
624643	2003 UG_{344}	—	October 19, 2003	Kitt Peak	Spacewatch	3:2 · SHU	4.2 km	MPC · JPL
624644	2003 UM_{349}	—	October 19, 2003	Apache Point	SDSS Collaboration	·	1.5 km	MPC · JPL
624645	2003 UN_{355}	—	October 19, 2003	Apache Point	SDSS Collaboration	LIX	2.1 km	MPC · JPL
624646	2003 UV_{356}	—	October 19, 2003	Kitt Peak	Spacewatch	·	630 m	MPC · JPL
624647	2003 UE_{358}	—	October 19, 2003	Kitt Peak	Spacewatch	PHO	730 m	MPC · JPL
624648	2003 UU_{360}	—	September 20, 2003	Kitt Peak	Spacewatch	·	990 m	MPC · JPL
624649	2003 UR_{362}	—	October 20, 2003	Kitt Peak	Spacewatch	EOS	1.2 km	MPC · JPL
624650	2003 UH_{364}	—	October 20, 2003	Kitt Peak	Spacewatch	·	1.2 km	MPC · JPL
624651	2003 UV_{370}	—	October 10, 2004	Kitt Peak	Deep Ecliptic Survey	·	2.5 km	MPC · JPL
624652	2003 UW_{371}	—	July 20, 2003	Palomar	NEAT	BAR	810 m	MPC · JPL
624653	2003 UU_{374}	—	September 16, 2003	Kitt Peak	Spacewatch	·	1.9 km	MPC · JPL
624654	2003 UD_{375}	—	September 17, 2003	Kitt Peak	Spacewatch	·	710 m	MPC · JPL
624655	2003 UW_{379}	—	October 22, 2003	Apache Point	SDSS	·	1.9 km	MPC · JPL
624656	2003 UA_{382}	—	October 22, 2003	Apache Point	SDSS Collaboration	T_{j} (2.96)	2.7 km	MPC · JPL
624657	2003 UF_{384}	—	October 22, 2003	Apache Point	SDSS Collaboration	·	2.4 km	MPC · JPL
624658	2003 UD_{389}	—	October 22, 2003	Apache Point	SDSS Collaboration	THB	1.8 km	MPC · JPL
624659	2003 UE_{395}	—	October 22, 2003	Apache Point	SDSS	EUN	700 m	MPC · JPL
624660	2003 UL_{397}	—	February 9, 2005	Mount Lemmon	Mount Lemmon Survey	·	1.9 km	MPC · JPL
624661	2003 UF_{398}	—	October 22, 2003	Apache Point	SDSS Collaboration	LIX	2.5 km	MPC · JPL
624662	2003 UQ_{399}	—	October 22, 2003	Apache Point	SDSS Collaboration	EUN	850 m	MPC · JPL
624663	2003 UY_{404}	—	October 23, 2003	Apache Point	SDSS Collaboration	·	950 m	MPC · JPL
624664	2003 UD_{416}	—	October 2, 2003	Kitt Peak	Spacewatch	MAS	450 m	MPC · JPL
624665	2003 UX_{423}	—	July 18, 2006	Siding Spring	SSS	(883)	600 m	MPC · JPL
624666	2003 UP_{424}	—	July 25, 2006	Mount Lemmon	Mount Lemmon Survey	·	610 m	MPC · JPL
624667	2003 US_{426}	—	September 1, 2010	Mount Lemmon	Mount Lemmon Survey	·	590 m	MPC · JPL
624668	2003 UN_{427}	—	August 28, 2006	Catalina	CSS	·	530 m	MPC · JPL
624669	2003 UC_{428}	—	November 9, 2013	Haleakala	Pan-STARRS 1	·	550 m	MPC · JPL
624670	2003 UF_{428}	—	March 8, 2013	Haleakala	Pan-STARRS 1	(5)	820 m	MPC · JPL
624671	2003 UR_{428}	—	October 24, 2013	Mount Lemmon	Mount Lemmon Survey	·	540 m	MPC · JPL
624672	2003 UB_{430}	—	December 5, 2010	Kitt Peak	Spacewatch	·	490 m	MPC · JPL
624673	2003 UE_{430}	—	October 21, 2003	Kitt Peak	Spacewatch	·	1.1 km	MPC · JPL
624674	2003 UP_{430}	—	October 20, 2003	Kitt Peak	Spacewatch	·	470 m	MPC · JPL
624675	2003 UC_{431}	—	October 27, 2003	Kitt Peak	Spacewatch	THB	1.9 km	MPC · JPL
624676	2003 UJ_{432}	—	August 27, 2006	Kitt Peak	Spacewatch	·	520 m	MPC · JPL
624677	2003 UE_{434}	—	April 27, 2012	Haleakala	Pan-STARRS 1	·	1.9 km	MPC · JPL
624678	2003 UM_{435}	—	October 17, 2003	Kitt Peak	Spacewatch	·	620 m	MPC · JPL
624679	2003 UU_{437}	—	August 28, 2016	Mount Lemmon	Mount Lemmon Survey	·	500 m	MPC · JPL
624680	2003 UD_{438}	—	January 4, 2016	Haleakala	Pan-STARRS 1	·	1.8 km	MPC · JPL
624681	2003 UF_{438}	—	January 23, 2011	Mount Lemmon	Mount Lemmon Survey	·	500 m	MPC · JPL
624682	2003 UR_{438}	—	October 8, 2007	Mount Lemmon	Mount Lemmon Survey	KON	1.4 km	MPC · JPL
624683	2003 UV_{438}	—	July 28, 2015	Haleakala	Pan-STARRS 1	·	840 m	MPC · JPL
624684	2003 UE_{439}	—	September 25, 2008	Mount Lemmon	Mount Lemmon Survey	·	2.5 km	MPC · JPL
624685	2003 UJ_{439}	—	November 29, 2003	Kitt Peak	Spacewatch	·	2.5 km	MPC · JPL
624686	2003 UK_{439}	—	September 10, 2016	Mount Lemmon	Mount Lemmon Survey	·	560 m	MPC · JPL
624687	2003 UB_{441}	—	July 28, 2008	Mount Lemmon	Mount Lemmon Survey	·	1.8 km	MPC · JPL
624688	2003 UD_{441}	—	September 27, 1992	Kitt Peak	Spacewatch	EOS	1.3 km	MPC · JPL
624689	2003 UC_{442}	—	October 1, 2008	Kitt Peak	Spacewatch	·	1.5 km	MPC · JPL
624690	2003 UL_{443}	—	October 23, 2003	Kitt Peak	Spacewatch	MIS	1.7 km	MPC · JPL
624691	2003 UZ_{443}	—	October 18, 2012	Haleakala	Pan-STARRS 1	·	860 m	MPC · JPL
624692	2003 UV_{444}	—	October 17, 2003	Kitt Peak	Spacewatch	·	1.1 km	MPC · JPL
624693	2003 UX_{444}	—	October 23, 2003	Kitt Peak	Spacewatch	·	410 m	MPC · JPL
624694	2003 UU_{445}	—	October 29, 2003	Kitt Peak	Spacewatch	·	920 m	MPC · JPL
624695	2003 UN_{446}	—	October 17, 2003	Kitt Peak	Spacewatch	THB	2.2 km	MPC · JPL
624696	2003 UE_{447}	—	October 21, 2003	Kitt Peak	Spacewatch	·	770 m	MPC · JPL
624697	2003 VZ_{4}	—	November 15, 2003	Kitt Peak	Spacewatch	·	940 m	MPC · JPL
624698	2003 WV	—	October 20, 2003	Kitt Peak	Spacewatch	·	700 m	MPC · JPL
624699	2003 WQ_{4}	—	November 16, 2003	Kitt Peak	Spacewatch	·	490 m	MPC · JPL
624700	2003 WU_{15}	—	October 23, 2003	Kitt Peak	Spacewatch	·	1.8 km	MPC · JPL

== 624701–624800 ==
back to top

Designation			Discovery			Properties		Ref
Permanent	Provisional	Named after	Date	Site	Discoverer(s)	Category	Diam.	Ref
624701	2003 WA_{16}	—	October 19, 2003	Kitt Peak	Spacewatch	·	2.0 km	MPC · JPL
624702	2003 WK_{28}	—	October 25, 2003	Socorro	LINEAR	·	540 m	MPC · JPL
624703	2003 WD_{32}	—	November 18, 2003	Kitt Peak	Spacewatch	·	1.0 km	MPC · JPL
624704	2003 WL_{36}	—	November 19, 2003	Kitt Peak	Spacewatch	·	1.3 km	MPC · JPL
624705	2003 WX_{38}	—	October 17, 2003	Kitt Peak	Spacewatch	T_{j} (2.97) · 3:2	4.0 km	MPC · JPL
624706	2003 WG_{51}	—	October 25, 2003	Kitt Peak	Spacewatch	·	780 m	MPC · JPL
624707	2003 WH_{51}	—	October 25, 2003	Kitt Peak	Spacewatch	·	1.9 km	MPC · JPL
624708	2003 WV_{53}	—	October 23, 2003	Kitt Peak	Spacewatch	·	1.2 km	MPC · JPL
624709	2003 WR_{54}	—	November 20, 2003	Socorro	LINEAR	·	530 m	MPC · JPL
624710	2003 WZ_{82}	—	October 17, 2003	Anderson Mesa	LONEOS	·	1.9 km	MPC · JPL
624711	2003 WJ_{94}	—	October 21, 2003	Palomar	NEAT	(1547)	1.0 km	MPC · JPL
624712	2003 WY_{106}	—	October 17, 2003	Kitt Peak	Spacewatch	·	850 m	MPC · JPL
624713	2003 WO_{147}	—	November 23, 2003	Kitt Peak	Spacewatch	·	2.2 km	MPC · JPL
624714	2003 WS_{175}	—	November 19, 2003	Kitt Peak	Spacewatch	·	540 m	MPC · JPL
624715	2003 WP_{176}	—	October 29, 2003	Kitt Peak	Spacewatch	·	2.2 km	MPC · JPL
624716	2003 WW_{179}	—	November 21, 2003	Kitt Peak	Spacewatch	·	2.0 km	MPC · JPL
624717	2003 WU_{185}	—	September 27, 2003	Kitt Peak	Spacewatch	(5)	740 m	MPC · JPL
624718	2003 WJ_{188}	—	November 18, 2003	Kitt Peak	Spacewatch	(5)	880 m	MPC · JPL
624719	2003 WA_{198}	—	November 23, 2003	Kitt Peak	Spacewatch	·	540 m	MPC · JPL
624720	2003 WB_{198}	—	August 27, 2006	Kitt Peak	Spacewatch	·	530 m	MPC · JPL
624721	2003 WN_{198}	—	November 20, 2003	Apache Point	SDSS Collaboration	·	1.7 km	MPC · JPL
624722	2003 WC_{200}	—	November 18, 2003	Kitt Peak	Spacewatch	·	1.2 km	MPC · JPL
624723	2003 WG_{201}	—	September 17, 2012	Mount Lemmon	Mount Lemmon Survey	HOF	1.9 km	MPC · JPL
624724	2003 WN_{202}	—	December 15, 2014	Mount Lemmon	Mount Lemmon Survey	·	2.2 km	MPC · JPL
624725	2003 WV_{202}	—	December 23, 2012	Haleakala	Pan-STARRS 1	ADE	1.6 km	MPC · JPL
624726	2003 WK_{203}	—	October 10, 1996	Kitt Peak	Spacewatch	·	510 m	MPC · JPL
624727	2003 WZ_{203}	—	November 19, 2003	Kitt Peak	Spacewatch	·	500 m	MPC · JPL
624728	2003 WG_{204}	—	November 20, 2003	Kitt Peak	Spacewatch	·	1.2 km	MPC · JPL
624729	2003 WF_{205}	—	November 26, 2003	Kitt Peak	Spacewatch	·	2.3 km	MPC · JPL
624730	2003 WH_{205}	—	October 2, 2008	Kitt Peak	Spacewatch	EOS	1.3 km	MPC · JPL
624731	2003 WJ_{205}	—	November 24, 2003	Kitt Peak	Spacewatch	·	1.1 km	MPC · JPL
624732	2003 WX_{205}	—	February 2, 2008	Kitt Peak	Spacewatch	·	550 m	MPC · JPL
624733	2003 WT_{206}	—	October 3, 2013	Haleakala	Pan-STARRS 1	·	570 m	MPC · JPL
624734	2003 WA_{208}	—	October 12, 2007	Mount Lemmon	Mount Lemmon Survey	·	670 m	MPC · JPL
624735	2003 WB_{208}	—	September 19, 2014	Haleakala	Pan-STARRS 1	LIX	2.7 km	MPC · JPL
624736	2003 WA_{210}	—	November 30, 2003	Kitt Peak	Spacewatch	·	2.1 km	MPC · JPL
624737	2003 WE_{210}	—	November 9, 2007	Kitt Peak	Spacewatch	·	690 m	MPC · JPL
624738	2003 WK_{210}	—	October 1, 2014	Haleakala	Pan-STARRS 1	·	2.2 km	MPC · JPL
624739	2003 WQ_{210}	—	January 7, 2017	Mount Lemmon	Mount Lemmon Survey	·	1 km	MPC · JPL
624740	2003 WW_{210}	—	May 10, 2007	Mount Lemmon	Mount Lemmon Survey	·	2.5 km	MPC · JPL
624741	2003 WP_{211}	—	January 16, 2018	Haleakala	Pan-STARRS 1	·	540 m	MPC · JPL
624742	2003 WY_{212}	—	December 25, 2010	Mount Lemmon	Mount Lemmon Survey	·	440 m	MPC · JPL
624743	2003 WF_{213}	—	September 17, 2006	Kitt Peak	Spacewatch	·	550 m	MPC · JPL
624744	2003 WP_{214}	—	November 19, 2003	Kitt Peak	Spacewatch	·	2.0 km	MPC · JPL
624745	2003 WM_{215}	—	November 19, 2003	Kitt Peak	Spacewatch	·	510 m	MPC · JPL
624746	2003 WN_{215}	—	November 30, 2003	Kitt Peak	Spacewatch	EOS	1.7 km	MPC · JPL
624747	2003 WV_{215}	—	November 20, 2003	Kitt Peak	Spacewatch	EUP	2.1 km	MPC · JPL
624748	2003 WK_{217}	—	November 19, 2003	Palomar	NEAT	·	600 m	MPC · JPL
624749	2003 XF_{28}	—	December 1, 2003	Kitt Peak	Spacewatch	·	2.0 km	MPC · JPL
624750	2003 XQ_{30}	—	December 1, 2003	Kitt Peak	Spacewatch	THM	1.7 km	MPC · JPL
624751	2003 XE_{40}	—	December 14, 2003	Kitt Peak	Spacewatch	·	1.1 km	MPC · JPL
624752	2003 XB_{46}	—	January 14, 2016	Haleakala	Pan-STARRS 1	·	1.9 km	MPC · JPL
624753	2003 YT_{3}	—	November 30, 2003	Socorro	LINEAR	·	1.4 km	MPC · JPL
624754	2003 YR_{17}	—	December 20, 2003	Socorro	LINEAR	·	1.2 km	MPC · JPL
624755	2003 YG_{19}	—	December 17, 2003	Kitt Peak	Spacewatch	·	2.4 km	MPC · JPL
624756	2003 YT_{28}	—	November 21, 2003	Socorro	LINEAR	·	2.3 km	MPC · JPL
624757	2003 YC_{37}	—	December 17, 2003	Kitt Peak	Spacewatch	·	1.3 km	MPC · JPL
624758	2003 YV_{67}	—	December 19, 2003	Kitt Peak	Spacewatch	THM	2.0 km	MPC · JPL
624759	2003 YO_{74}	—	December 18, 2003	Socorro	LINEAR	·	1.5 km	MPC · JPL
624760	2003 YU_{110}	—	September 2, 2002	Kitt Peak	Spacewatch	·	1.3 km	MPC · JPL
624761	2003 YW_{124}	—	December 29, 2003	Catalina	CSS	H	550 m	MPC · JPL
624762	2003 YZ_{161}	—	December 17, 2003	Kitt Peak	Spacewatch	·	2.2 km	MPC · JPL
624763	2003 YA_{184}	—	January 18, 2004	Kitt Peak	Spacewatch	·	590 m	MPC · JPL
624764	2003 YM_{184}	—	October 8, 2007	Kitt Peak	Spacewatch	(5)	880 m	MPC · JPL
624765	2003 YA_{185}	—	January 16, 2011	Mount Lemmon	Mount Lemmon Survey	·	540 m	MPC · JPL
624766	2003 YF_{185}	—	February 12, 2004	Kitt Peak	Spacewatch	·	540 m	MPC · JPL
624767	2003 YV_{188}	—	October 12, 2007	Catalina	CSS	·	800 m	MPC · JPL
624768	2003 YA_{189}	—	December 27, 2003	Kitt Peak	Spacewatch	·	550 m	MPC · JPL
624769	2003 YG_{189}	—	December 24, 2014	Kitt Peak	Spacewatch	·	2.5 km	MPC · JPL
624770	2004 AN_{6}	—	December 21, 2003	Kitt Peak	Spacewatch	·	390 m	MPC · JPL
624771	2004 AN_{8}	—	January 15, 2004	Kitt Peak	Spacewatch	MIS	1.6 km	MPC · JPL
624772	2004 AD_{15}	—	January 15, 2004	Kitt Peak	Spacewatch	·	1.5 km	MPC · JPL
624773	2004 AE_{22}	—	January 15, 2004	Kitt Peak	Spacewatch	·	2.4 km	MPC · JPL
624774	2004 AD_{27}	—	January 13, 2004	Kitt Peak	Spacewatch	EUN	1.0 km	MPC · JPL
624775	2004 BU	—	January 16, 2004	Kitt Peak	Spacewatch	·	1.7 km	MPC · JPL
624776	2004 BK_{6}	—	January 16, 2004	Kitt Peak	Spacewatch	·	620 m	MPC · JPL
624777	2004 BV_{13}	—	January 17, 2004	Palomar	NEAT	·	1.1 km	MPC · JPL
624778	2004 BE_{16}	—	January 18, 2004	Palomar	NEAT	·	1.8 km	MPC · JPL
624779	2004 BK_{24}	—	December 19, 2003	Kitt Peak	Spacewatch	·	1.6 km	MPC · JPL
624780	2004 BG_{40}	—	January 21, 2004	Socorro	LINEAR	EUP	2.7 km	MPC · JPL
624781	2004 BU_{51}	—	January 16, 2004	Palomar	NEAT	PHO	920 m	MPC · JPL
624782	2004 BA_{70}	—	December 22, 2003	Kitt Peak	Spacewatch	TIR	2.4 km	MPC · JPL
624783	2004 BW_{78}	—	January 17, 2004	Palomar	NEAT	BAP	690 m	MPC · JPL
624784	2004 BX_{124}	—	January 16, 2004	Palomar	NEAT	·	2.5 km	MPC · JPL
624785	2004 BP_{125}	—	January 16, 2004	Kitt Peak	Spacewatch	·	630 m	MPC · JPL
624786	2004 BV_{126}	—	January 16, 2004	Kitt Peak	Spacewatch	·	1.2 km	MPC · JPL
624787	2004 BN_{134}	—	January 18, 2004	Palomar	NEAT	·	2.4 km	MPC · JPL
624788	2004 BD_{136}	—	January 19, 2004	Kitt Peak	Spacewatch	·	1.2 km	MPC · JPL
624789	2004 BW_{136}	—	January 19, 2004	Kitt Peak	Spacewatch	·	2.0 km	MPC · JPL
624790	2004 BZ_{168}	—	June 5, 2011	Mount Lemmon	Mount Lemmon Survey	·	2.4 km	MPC · JPL
624791	2004 BZ_{171}	—	July 24, 2015	Haleakala	Pan-STARRS 1	·	1.1 km	MPC · JPL
624792	2004 BN_{172}	—	October 20, 2011	Mount Lemmon	Mount Lemmon Survey	·	1.0 km	MPC · JPL
624793	2004 BZ_{172}	—	October 25, 2008	Kitt Peak	Spacewatch	VER	2.0 km	MPC · JPL
624794	2004 BA_{173}	—	January 18, 2015	Mount Lemmon	Mount Lemmon Survey	·	2.1 km	MPC · JPL
624795	2004 CZ_{31}	—	January 19, 2004	Kitt Peak	Spacewatch	·	2.4 km	MPC · JPL
624796	2004 CD_{33}	—	January 28, 2004	Kitt Peak	Spacewatch	·	1.2 km	MPC · JPL
624797	2004 CQ_{47}	—	February 14, 2004	Haleakala	NEAT	·	1.0 km	MPC · JPL
624798	2004 CC_{55}	—	February 12, 2004	Kitt Peak	Spacewatch	TIR	1.7 km	MPC · JPL
624799	2004 CF_{82}	—	February 12, 2004	Kitt Peak	Spacewatch	·	1.1 km	MPC · JPL
624800	2004 CK_{91}	—	February 12, 2004	Kitt Peak	Spacewatch	H	410 m	MPC · JPL

== 624801–624900 ==
back to top

Designation			Discovery			Properties		Ref
Permanent	Provisional	Named after	Date	Site	Discoverer(s)	Category	Diam.	Ref
624801	2004 CS_{107}	—	February 14, 2004	Kitt Peak	Spacewatch	·	1.3 km	MPC · JPL
624802	2004 CT_{120}	—	February 12, 2004	Kitt Peak	Spacewatch	·	1.9 km	MPC · JPL
624803	2004 CW_{123}	—	February 12, 2004	Kitt Peak	Spacewatch	·	540 m	MPC · JPL
624804	2004 CS_{131}	—	November 1, 2006	Mount Lemmon	Mount Lemmon Survey	·	560 m	MPC · JPL
624805	2004 CC_{132}	—	February 7, 2011	Mount Lemmon	Mount Lemmon Survey	·	470 m	MPC · JPL
624806	2004 CD_{132}	—	October 4, 2006	Mount Lemmon	Mount Lemmon Survey	·	660 m	MPC · JPL
624807	2004 CM_{133}	—	June 24, 2014	Haleakala	Pan-STARRS 1	·	1.8 km	MPC · JPL
624808	2004 CW_{133}	—	February 11, 2018	Haleakala	Pan-STARRS 1	·	710 m	MPC · JPL
624809	2004 CV_{135}	—	January 18, 2008	Mount Lemmon	Mount Lemmon Survey	(5)	990 m	MPC · JPL
624810	2004 DP_{16}	—	February 18, 2004	Kitt Peak	Spacewatch	·	2.2 km	MPC · JPL
624811	2004 DY_{53}	—	February 12, 2004	Kitt Peak	Spacewatch	THM	2.4 km	MPC · JPL
624812	2004 DW_{58}	—	February 23, 2004	Socorro	LINEAR	·	820 m	MPC · JPL
624813	2004 DQ_{66}	—	February 26, 2004	Kitt Peak	Deep Ecliptic Survey	LIX	2.3 km	MPC · JPL
624814	2004 DB_{70}	—	February 12, 2004	Kitt Peak	Spacewatch	·	1.4 km	MPC · JPL
624815	2004 DU_{74}	—	February 17, 2004	Kitt Peak	Spacewatch	·	1.2 km	MPC · JPL
624816	2004 DO_{81}	—	September 19, 2009	Mount Lemmon	Mount Lemmon Survey	·	690 m	MPC · JPL
624817	2004 DP_{81}	—	February 26, 2004	Kitt Peak	Deep Ecliptic Survey	3:2 · SHU	4.2 km	MPC · JPL
624818	2004 DQ_{81}	—	February 16, 2004	Kitt Peak	Spacewatch	·	970 m	MPC · JPL
624819	2004 DY_{82}	—	March 4, 2011	Mount Lemmon	Mount Lemmon Survey	·	580 m	MPC · JPL
624820	2004 DU_{83}	—	September 30, 2008	Mount Lemmon	Mount Lemmon Survey	·	2.4 km	MPC · JPL
624821	2004 DC_{84}	—	August 21, 2006	Kitt Peak	Spacewatch	·	1.5 km	MPC · JPL
624822	2004 DH_{85}	—	March 31, 2008	Mount Lemmon	Mount Lemmon Survey	·	860 m	MPC · JPL
624823	2004 DS_{85}	—	November 6, 2016	Mount Lemmon	Mount Lemmon Survey	·	750 m	MPC · JPL
624824	2004 DP_{87}	—	January 13, 2008	Kitt Peak	Spacewatch	·	1.0 km	MPC · JPL
624825	2004 DS_{87}	—	March 2, 2011	Mount Lemmon	Mount Lemmon Survey	·	470 m	MPC · JPL
624826	2004 DC_{88}	—	September 13, 2013	Mount Lemmon	Mount Lemmon Survey	·	2.1 km	MPC · JPL
624827	2004 DR_{88}	—	December 22, 2008	Kitt Peak	Spacewatch	EOS	1.6 km	MPC · JPL
624828	2004 DW_{88}	—	September 25, 2009	Kitt Peak	Spacewatch	V	470 m	MPC · JPL
624829	2004 EL_{1}	—	March 12, 2004	Palomar	NEAT	H	350 m	MPC · JPL
624830	2004 EC_{25}	—	March 12, 2004	Palomar	NEAT	·	2.1 km	MPC · JPL
624831	2004 EE_{29}	—	March 15, 2004	Kitt Peak	Spacewatch	·	2.4 km	MPC · JPL
624832	2004 EC_{39}	—	February 18, 2004	Catalina	CSS	PHO	880 m	MPC · JPL
624833	2004 EQ_{62}	—	March 13, 2004	Palomar	NEAT	·	880 m	MPC · JPL
624834	2004 EY_{98}	—	March 15, 2004	Kitt Peak	Spacewatch	·	2.5 km	MPC · JPL
624835	2004 ES_{102}	—	March 15, 2004	Kitt Peak	Spacewatch	·	630 m	MPC · JPL
624836	2004 EQ_{109}	—	March 15, 2004	Kitt Peak	Spacewatch	·	570 m	MPC · JPL
624837	2004 ES_{112}	—	March 15, 2004	Kitt Peak	Spacewatch	·	960 m	MPC · JPL
624838	2004 EJ_{116}	—	March 13, 2004	Palomar	NEAT	·	1.5 km	MPC · JPL
624839	2004 EJ_{117}	—	October 22, 2009	Mount Lemmon	Mount Lemmon Survey	·	1 km	MPC · JPL
624840	2004 FK_{9}	—	March 16, 2004	Kitt Peak	Spacewatch	·	1.0 km	MPC · JPL
624841	2004 FK_{67}	—	March 12, 2004	Palomar	NEAT	·	950 m	MPC · JPL
624842	2004 FY_{75}	—	March 17, 2004	Kitt Peak	Spacewatch	·	1.4 km	MPC · JPL
624843	2004 FM_{76}	—	March 18, 2004	Kitt Peak	Spacewatch	·	540 m	MPC · JPL
624844	2004 FD_{91}	—	March 21, 2004	Kitt Peak	Spacewatch	·	770 m	MPC · JPL
624845	2004 FD_{104}	—	March 23, 2004	Kitt Peak	Spacewatch	·	1.0 km	MPC · JPL
624846	2004 FL_{113}	—	March 21, 2004	Kitt Peak	Spacewatch	·	2.6 km	MPC · JPL
624847	2004 FV_{113}	—	March 21, 2004	Kitt Peak	Spacewatch	VER	2.9 km	MPC · JPL
624848	2004 FF_{134}	—	March 17, 2004	Catalina	CSS	·	830 m	MPC · JPL
624849	2004 FZ_{157}	—	March 17, 2004	Kitt Peak	Spacewatch	NYS	550 m	MPC · JPL
624850	2004 FT_{168}	—	August 5, 2005	Palomar	NEAT	MAR	1.0 km	MPC · JPL
624851	2004 FU_{169}	—	June 15, 2015	Mount Lemmon	Mount Lemmon Survey	V	550 m	MPC · JPL
624852	2004 FL_{170}	—	March 29, 2004	Kitt Peak	Spacewatch	·	740 m	MPC · JPL
624853	2004 FN_{175}	—	December 13, 2013	Mount Lemmon	Mount Lemmon Survey	·	720 m	MPC · JPL
624854	2004 FB_{176}	—	November 16, 2017	Mount Lemmon	Mount Lemmon Survey	3:2	4.2 km	MPC · JPL
624855	2004 FR_{176}	—	February 26, 2012	Haleakala	Pan-STARRS 1	3:2	4.5 km	MPC · JPL
624856	2004 FY_{177}	—	March 16, 2004	Apache Point	SDSS Collaboration	H	420 m	MPC · JPL
624857	2004 GQ_{2}	—	March 31, 2004	Catalina	CSS	·	1.5 km	MPC · JPL
624858	2004 GL_{5}	—	April 11, 2004	Palomar	NEAT	·	1.9 km	MPC · JPL
624859	2004 GV_{6}	—	March 17, 2004	Kitt Peak	Spacewatch	HYG	2.6 km	MPC · JPL
624860	2004 GW_{44}	—	April 12, 2004	Kitt Peak	Spacewatch	·	1.5 km	MPC · JPL
624861	2004 GA_{62}	—	March 23, 2004	Kitt Peak	Spacewatch	·	620 m	MPC · JPL
624862	2004 GB_{68}	—	April 13, 2004	Kitt Peak	Spacewatch	·	600 m	MPC · JPL
624863	2004 GJ_{84}	—	April 14, 2004	Kitt Peak	Spacewatch	·	750 m	MPC · JPL
624864	2004 GU_{89}	—	April 12, 2004	Kitt Peak	Spacewatch	·	640 m	MPC · JPL
624865	2004 GA_{90}	—	December 13, 2006	Kitt Peak	Spacewatch	·	790 m	MPC · JPL
624866	2004 GB_{90}	—	September 17, 2014	Haleakala	Pan-STARRS 1	·	1.2 km	MPC · JPL
624867	2004 GA_{91}	—	March 13, 2011	Mount Lemmon	Mount Lemmon Survey	V	600 m	MPC · JPL
624868	2004 HE_{56}	—	April 25, 2004	Socorro	LINEAR	·	1.2 km	MPC · JPL
624869	2004 HV_{80}	—	March 26, 2009	Kitt Peak	Spacewatch	H	270 m	MPC · JPL
624870	2004 HJ_{82}	—	August 26, 2012	Haleakala	Pan-STARRS 1	·	870 m	MPC · JPL
624871	2004 HJ_{83}	—	January 14, 2018	Haleakala	Pan-STARRS 1	·	810 m	MPC · JPL
624872	2004 HA_{84}	—	November 11, 2013	Charleston	R. Holmes, Linder, T.	·	2.0 km	MPC · JPL
624873	2004 JU_{9}	—	May 13, 2004	Kitt Peak	Spacewatch	·	710 m	MPC · JPL
624874	2004 JL_{17}	—	April 25, 2004	Socorro	LINEAR	·	1.2 km	MPC · JPL
624875	2004 JN_{43}	—	May 15, 2004	Campo Imperatore	CINEOS	JUN	900 m	MPC · JPL
624876	2004 JL_{56}	—	May 13, 2004	Apache Point	SDSS Collaboration	·	2.5 km	MPC · JPL
624877	2004 JX_{57}	—	February 17, 2015	Haleakala	Pan-STARRS 1	·	840 m	MPC · JPL
624878	2004 JC_{58}	—	May 13, 2004	Kitt Peak	Spacewatch	·	730 m	MPC · JPL
624879	2004 KP_{19}	—	December 14, 2006	Kitt Peak	Spacewatch	·	1.1 km	MPC · JPL
624880	2004 KR_{19}	—	October 17, 2010	Mount Lemmon	Mount Lemmon Survey	·	1.7 km	MPC · JPL
624881	2004 KG_{20}	—	May 18, 2012	Mount Lemmon	Mount Lemmon Survey	H	370 m	MPC · JPL
624882	2004 KJ_{20}	—	October 17, 2012	Haleakala	Pan-STARRS 1	·	2.3 km	MPC · JPL
624883	2004 LH_{32}	—	October 29, 2005	Mount Lemmon	Mount Lemmon Survey	·	960 m	MPC · JPL
624884	2004 MW_{8}	—	June 24, 2004	Mauna Kea	CFHT Legacy Survey	centaur	106 km	MPC · JPL
624885	2004 MY_{8}	—	August 28, 2009	Kitt Peak	Spacewatch	·	1.7 km	MPC · JPL
624886	2004 MD_{9}	—	June 29, 2004	Siding Spring	SSS	·	1.6 km	MPC · JPL
624887	2004 NC_{34}	—	November 11, 2009	Kitt Peak	Spacewatch	·	910 m	MPC · JPL
624888	2004 NK_{34}	—	January 24, 2011	Kitt Peak	Spacewatch	H	500 m	MPC · JPL
624889	2004 OG_{15}	—	July 17, 2004	Cerro Tololo	Deep Ecliptic Survey	·	1.8 km	MPC · JPL
624890	2004 PE_{59}	—	August 9, 2004	Socorro	LINEAR	T_{j} (2.99)	1.8 km	MPC · JPL
624891	2004 PE_{62}	—	August 10, 2004	Socorro	LINEAR	·	850 m	MPC · JPL
624892	2004 PN_{78}	—	July 18, 2004	Socorro	LINEAR	·	1.5 km	MPC · JPL
624893	2004 PR_{118}	—	October 1, 1995	Kitt Peak	Spacewatch	·	1.6 km	MPC · JPL
624894	2004 QE_{11}	—	August 8, 2004	Palomar	NEAT	·	1.8 km	MPC · JPL
624895	2004 QH_{30}	—	September 22, 2009	Kitt Peak	Spacewatch	·	1.6 km	MPC · JPL
624896	2004 QD_{32}	—	November 11, 2010	Kitt Peak	Spacewatch	·	1.7 km	MPC · JPL
624897	2004 QG_{32}	—	August 22, 2004	Kitt Peak	Spacewatch	MAS	640 m	MPC · JPL
624898	2004 QM_{32}	—	August 20, 2008	Kitt Peak	Spacewatch	·	540 m	MPC · JPL
624899	2004 QX_{33}	—	October 22, 2012	Haleakala	Pan-STARRS 1	·	980 m	MPC · JPL
624900	2004 QA_{36}	—	November 25, 2010	Mount Lemmon	Mount Lemmon Survey	·	1.3 km	MPC · JPL

== 624901–625000 ==
back to top

Designation			Discovery			Properties		Ref
Permanent	Provisional	Named after	Date	Site	Discoverer(s)	Category	Diam.	Ref
624901	2004 QC_{36}	—	January 26, 2011	Mount Lemmon	Mount Lemmon Survey	H	300 m	MPC · JPL
624902	2004 RQ_{4}	—	September 4, 2004	Palomar	NEAT	·	1.3 km	MPC · JPL
624903	2004 RM_{10}	—	August 11, 2004	Socorro	LINEAR	·	810 m	MPC · JPL
624904	2004 RS_{38}	—	August 14, 2004	Cerro Tololo	Deep Ecliptic Survey	T_{j} (2.98)	1.9 km	MPC · JPL
624905	2004 RC_{72}	—	September 8, 2004	Socorro	LINEAR	·	1.7 km	MPC · JPL
624906	2004 RC_{112}	—	July 17, 2004	Cerro Tololo	Deep Ecliptic Survey	·	1.8 km	MPC · JPL
624907	2004 RC_{122}	—	September 7, 2004	Kitt Peak	Spacewatch	·	1 km	MPC · JPL
624908	2004 RQ_{125}	—	September 7, 2004	Kitt Peak	Spacewatch	·	1.7 km	MPC · JPL
624909	2004 RN_{132}	—	September 7, 2004	Kitt Peak	Spacewatch	·	1.9 km	MPC · JPL
624910	2004 RU_{165}	—	September 7, 2004	Socorro	LINEAR	·	2.8 km	MPC · JPL
624911	2004 RM_{169}	—	September 8, 2004	Socorro	LINEAR	·	1.5 km	MPC · JPL
624912	2004 RE_{177}	—	September 10, 2004	Socorro	LINEAR	·	1.6 km	MPC · JPL
624913	2004 RR_{202}	—	September 11, 2004	Kitt Peak	Spacewatch	AST	1.4 km	MPC · JPL
624914	2004 RB_{238}	—	September 10, 2004	Kitt Peak	Spacewatch	·	1.2 km	MPC · JPL
624915	2004 RJ_{262}	—	September 10, 2004	Kitt Peak	Spacewatch	·	440 m	MPC · JPL
624916	2004 RJ_{265}	—	September 10, 2004	Kitt Peak	Spacewatch	·	1.4 km	MPC · JPL
624917	2004 RM_{278}	—	September 15, 2004	Kitt Peak	Spacewatch	·	510 m	MPC · JPL
624918	2004 RM_{284}	—	September 15, 2004	Kitt Peak	Spacewatch	·	690 m	MPC · JPL
624919	2004 RL_{286}	—	September 15, 2004	Kitt Peak	Spacewatch	·	590 m	MPC · JPL
624920	2004 RY_{288}	—	September 15, 2004	Saint-Sulpice	B. Christophe	AGN	1.0 km	MPC · JPL
624921	2004 RV_{294}	—	September 11, 2004	Kitt Peak	Spacewatch	·	1.6 km	MPC · JPL
624922	2004 RE_{295}	—	September 11, 2004	Kitt Peak	Spacewatch	·	1.1 km	MPC · JPL
624923	2004 RL_{301}	—	September 11, 2004	Kitt Peak	Spacewatch	·	840 m	MPC · JPL
624924	2004 RO_{311}	—	September 14, 2004	Socorro	LINEAR	NYS	980 m	MPC · JPL
624925	2004 RU_{330}	—	September 15, 2004	Kitt Peak	Spacewatch	·	740 m	MPC · JPL
624926	2004 RD_{345}	—	November 3, 2015	Mount Lemmon	Mount Lemmon Survey	·	1.6 km	MPC · JPL
624927	2004 RG_{349}	—	September 10, 2004	Kitt Peak	Spacewatch	·	1.3 km	MPC · JPL
624928	2004 RM_{359}	—	August 14, 2012	Haleakala	Pan-STARRS 1	·	1.2 km	MPC · JPL
624929	2004 RU_{361}	—	April 28, 2011	Haleakala	Pan-STARRS 1	H	330 m	MPC · JPL
624930	2004 RZ_{363}	—	September 12, 2004	Kitt Peak	Spacewatch	·	2.1 km	MPC · JPL
624931	2004 RB_{365}	—	September 10, 2004	Kitt Peak	Spacewatch	·	2.0 km	MPC · JPL
624932	2004 SQ_{5}	—	September 17, 2004	Kitt Peak	Spacewatch	·	410 m	MPC · JPL
624933	2004 SM_{6}	—	September 17, 2004	Kitt Peak	Spacewatch	·	1.5 km	MPC · JPL
624934	2004 SL_{55}	—	September 23, 2004	Kitt Peak	Spacewatch	·	1.5 km	MPC · JPL
624935	2004 SN_{63}	—	February 13, 2008	Kitt Peak	Spacewatch	·	2.9 km	MPC · JPL
624936	2004 ST_{64}	—	September 16, 2004	Kitt Peak	Spacewatch	·	1.9 km	MPC · JPL
624937	2004 SY_{64}	—	April 29, 2014	Kitt Peak	Spacewatch	·	1.7 km	MPC · JPL
624938	2004 SZ_{64}	—	September 9, 2015	Haleakala	Pan-STARRS 1	·	1.5 km	MPC · JPL
624939	2004 SG_{65}	—	January 30, 2011	Haleakala	Pan-STARRS 1	AGN	790 m	MPC · JPL
624940	2004 TG_{57}	—	October 5, 2004	Kitt Peak	Spacewatch	HYG	1.7 km	MPC · JPL
624941	2004 TH_{73}	—	October 6, 2004	Kitt Peak	Spacewatch	·	1.8 km	MPC · JPL
624942	2004 TB_{80}	—	October 5, 2004	Kitt Peak	Spacewatch	·	430 m	MPC · JPL
624943	2004 TE_{87}	—	October 5, 2004	Kitt Peak	Spacewatch	·	1.2 km	MPC · JPL
624944	2004 TN_{102}	—	October 6, 2004	Palomar	NEAT	·	650 m	MPC · JPL
624945	2004 TF_{142}	—	September 22, 2004	Kitt Peak	Spacewatch	·	1.4 km	MPC · JPL
624946	2004 TS_{150}	—	October 6, 2004	Kitt Peak	Spacewatch	·	3.1 km	MPC · JPL
624947	2004 TR_{154}	—	October 6, 2004	Kitt Peak	Spacewatch	THM	1.7 km	MPC · JPL
624948	2004 TX_{179}	—	October 7, 2004	Kitt Peak	Spacewatch	·	410 m	MPC · JPL
624949	2004 TN_{183}	—	September 10, 2004	Kitt Peak	Spacewatch	·	450 m	MPC · JPL
624950	2004 TT_{184}	—	September 10, 2004	Kitt Peak	Spacewatch	·	1.4 km	MPC · JPL
624951	2004 TU_{187}	—	September 10, 2004	Kitt Peak	Spacewatch	HYG	2.2 km	MPC · JPL
624952	2004 TX_{191}	—	October 7, 2004	Kitt Peak	Spacewatch	·	950 m	MPC · JPL
624953	2004 TK_{197}	—	October 7, 2004	Kitt Peak	Spacewatch	·	1.1 km	MPC · JPL
624954	2004 TE_{208}	—	October 7, 2004	Kitt Peak	Spacewatch	·	2.3 km	MPC · JPL
624955	2004 TE_{209}	—	October 8, 2004	Kitt Peak	Spacewatch	·	1.8 km	MPC · JPL
624956	2004 TU_{211}	—	October 8, 2004	Kitt Peak	Spacewatch	NYS	900 m	MPC · JPL
624957	2004 TA_{222}	—	August 26, 2004	Catalina	CSS	·	630 m	MPC · JPL
624958	2004 TD_{228}	—	October 8, 2004	Kitt Peak	Spacewatch	·	1.0 km	MPC · JPL
624959	2004 TJ_{235}	—	October 8, 2004	Kitt Peak	Spacewatch	·	2.0 km	MPC · JPL
624960	2004 TZ_{235}	—	October 8, 2004	Kitt Peak	Spacewatch	THM	1.7 km	MPC · JPL
624961	2004 TZ_{236}	—	October 8, 2004	Goodricke-Pigott	R. A. Tucker	·	710 m	MPC · JPL
624962	2004 TV_{256}	—	September 7, 2004	Kitt Peak	Spacewatch	·	370 m	MPC · JPL
624963	2004 TA_{262}	—	October 9, 2004	Kitt Peak	Spacewatch	·	460 m	MPC · JPL
624964	2004 TG_{262}	—	October 9, 2004	Kitt Peak	Spacewatch	NYS	1.0 km	MPC · JPL
624965	2004 TA_{272}	—	October 9, 2004	Kitt Peak	Spacewatch	·	620 m	MPC · JPL
624966	2004 TS_{284}	—	October 8, 2004	Kitt Peak	Spacewatch	·	850 m	MPC · JPL
624967	2004 TH_{293}	—	October 10, 2004	Kitt Peak	Spacewatch	·	2.3 km	MPC · JPL
624968	2004 TU_{297}	—	October 12, 2004	Kitt Peak	Spacewatch	(16286)	1.3 km	MPC · JPL
624969	2004 TV_{297}	—	September 15, 2004	Kitt Peak	Spacewatch	THM · critical	1.7 km	MPC · JPL
624970	2004 TL_{312}	—	October 11, 2004	Kitt Peak	Spacewatch	TIR	1.8 km	MPC · JPL
624971	2004 TO_{320}	—	October 11, 2004	Kitt Peak	Spacewatch	EUN	920 m	MPC · JPL
624972	2004 TA_{336}	—	October 10, 2004	Kitt Peak	Spacewatch	·	2.3 km	MPC · JPL
624973	2004 TX_{345}	—	September 18, 2004	Socorro	LINEAR	·	2.0 km	MPC · JPL
624974	2004 TM_{361}	—	October 13, 2004	Kitt Peak	Spacewatch	·	2.2 km	MPC · JPL
624975	2004 TT_{368}	—	October 8, 2004	Kitt Peak	Spacewatch	·	490 m	MPC · JPL
624976	2004 TM_{376}	—	August 26, 2012	Haleakala	Pan-STARRS 1	·	800 m	MPC · JPL
624977	2004 TV_{380}	—	September 16, 2009	Kitt Peak	Spacewatch	·	1.8 km	MPC · JPL
624978	2004 TF_{383}	—	September 9, 2015	Haleakala	Pan-STARRS 1	·	1.8 km	MPC · JPL
624979	2004 TU_{383}	—	February 3, 2012	Haleakala	Pan-STARRS 1	·	440 m	MPC · JPL
624980	2004 TP_{385}	—	August 12, 2013	Haleakala	Pan-STARRS 1	KOR	1.1 km	MPC · JPL
624981	2004 VN_{34}	—	October 23, 2004	Kitt Peak	Spacewatch	·	1.9 km	MPC · JPL
624982	2004 VY_{41}	—	November 4, 2004	Kitt Peak	Spacewatch	·	1.6 km	MPC · JPL
624983	2004 VW_{42}	—	November 4, 2004	Kitt Peak	Spacewatch	·	2.0 km	MPC · JPL
624984	2004 VL_{46}	—	November 4, 2004	Kitt Peak	Spacewatch	·	470 m	MPC · JPL
624985	2004 VE_{68}	—	November 10, 2004	Kitt Peak	Spacewatch	H	410 m	MPC · JPL
624986	2004 VH_{81}	—	October 9, 2004	Kitt Peak	Spacewatch	·	1.2 km	MPC · JPL
624987	2004 VW_{86}	—	November 11, 2004	Kitt Peak	Spacewatch	·	1.4 km	MPC · JPL
624988	2004 VZ_{96}	—	November 11, 2004	Kitt Peak	Spacewatch	BRA	1.8 km	MPC · JPL
624989	2004 VU_{101}	—	November 9, 2004	Mauna Kea	Veillet, C.	·	1.1 km	MPC · JPL
624990	2004 VD_{104}	—	November 3, 2004	Kitt Peak	Spacewatch	3:2	3.4 km	MPC · JPL
624991	2004 VK_{105}	—	November 9, 2004	Mauna Kea	Veillet, C.	·	2.0 km	MPC · JPL
624992	2004 VA_{120}	—	November 9, 2004	Mauna Kea	P. A. Wiegert, A. Papadimos	·	390 m	MPC · JPL
624993	2004 VG_{134}	—	September 10, 2015	Haleakala	Pan-STARRS 1	NYS	850 m	MPC · JPL
624994	2004 VX_{134}	—	November 30, 2008	Mount Lemmon	Mount Lemmon Survey	·	840 m	MPC · JPL
624995	2004 VH_{135}	—	November 9, 2008	Kitt Peak	Spacewatch	NYS	1.0 km	MPC · JPL
624996	2004 VZ_{135}	—	January 21, 2015	Haleakala	Pan-STARRS 1	·	470 m	MPC · JPL
624997	2004 VJ_{136}	—	August 28, 2009	Kitt Peak	Spacewatch	·	1.5 km	MPC · JPL
624998	2004 VR_{136}	—	September 26, 2009	Catalina	CSS	·	2.2 km	MPC · JPL
624999	2004 WQ_{7}	—	November 11, 2004	Kitt Peak	Spacewatch	·	1.8 km	MPC · JPL
625000	2004 XQ_{52}	—	December 9, 2004	Kitt Peak	Spacewatch	3:2 · SHU	4.1 km	MPC · JPL

back to top

== Meaning of names ==
As minor planet discoveries are confirmed, they are given a permanent number by the IAU's Minor Planet Center (MPC), and the discoverers can then submit names for them, following the IAU's naming conventions. The list below concerns those minor planets in the specified number-range that have received names, and explains the meanings of those names.

Official naming citations of newly named small Solar System bodies are approved and published in a bulletin by IAU's Working Group for Small Bodies Nomenclature (WGSBN). Before May 2021, citations were published in MPC's Minor Planet Circulars for many decades. Recent citations can also be found on the JPL Small-Body Database (SBDB). Until his death in 2016, German astronomer Lutz D. Schmadel compiled these citations into the Dictionary of Minor Planet Names (DMP) and regularly updated the collection.

Based on Paul Herget's The Names of the Minor Planets, Schmadel also researched the unclear origin of numerous asteroids, most of which had been named prior to World War II. This article incorporates text from this source, which is in the public domain: SBDB New namings may only be added to this list below after official publication as the preannouncement of names is condemned. The WGSBN publishes a comprehensive guideline for the naming rules of non-cometary small Solar System bodies.

Named minor planet	Provisional	This minor planet was named for...	Ref · Catalog
624448 Gennadiyborisov	2003 AJ_{95}	Gennadiy Vladimirovich Borisov (b. 1962), a Ukrainian telescope maker and amateur astronomer.	IAU · 624448
