= Bohyunsan =

Bohyeonsan may refer to:

- 34666 Bohyunsan, a main-belt asteroid
- Bohyeonsan, a mountain in South Korea
