= Bohyeonsa =

Buddhist temple in South Korea

Bohyeon Temple

Religion
- Affiliation: Buddhism

Location
- Location: Jeonggak-ri, Hwabuk-myeon, Yeongcheon, Gyeongsangbuk-do
- Country: South Korea
- Interactive map of Bohyeon Temple
- Coordinates: 36.15417°N 129.02139°E

Architecture
- Elevation: 493 m (1,617 ft)

Korean name
- Hangul: 보현사
- Hanja: 普賢寺
- RR: Bohyeonsa
- MR: Pohyŏnsa

Bohyeonsa (Korean: 보현사) is a temple located in Yeongcheon, Gyeongsangbuk-do, South Korea.

== See also ==
- Bohyeonsan
