= Bohyeonsan =

Mountain in South Korea

Coordinates: 36°09′47″N 128°58′26″E

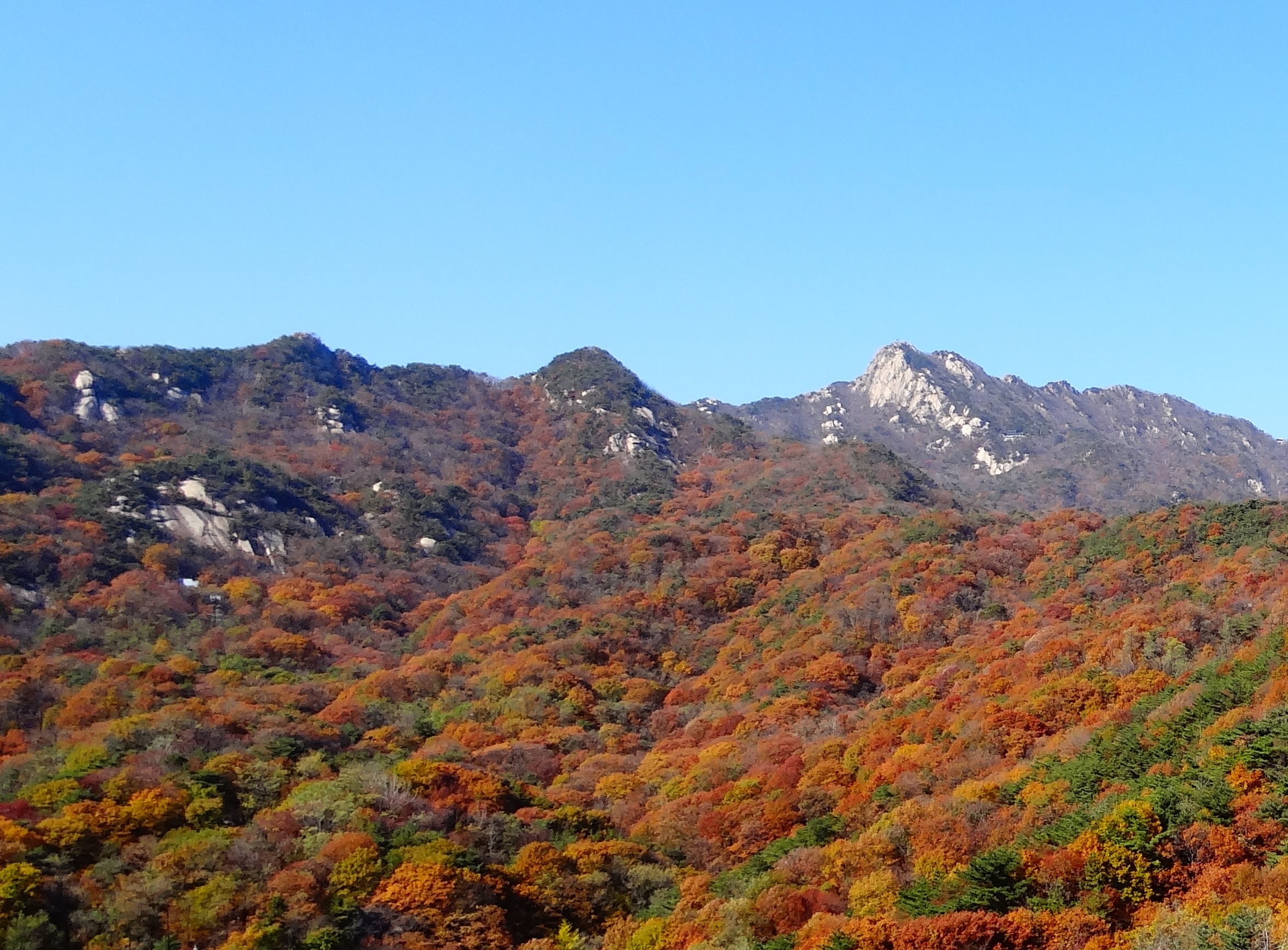
- Hyeongjae Peak (left) and Bohyeon Peak (right), viewed from Kookmin University.

Highest point
- Elevation: 1,121 m (3,678 ft)

Geography
- Location: North Gyeongsang Province, South Korea

Korean name
- Hangul: 보현산
- Hanja: 普賢山
- RR: Bohyeonsan
- MR: Pohyŏnsan

Bohyeonsan or Bohyeon Mountain or Mount Bohyeon is located in North Gyeongsang Province, eastern South Korea. Its peak has an elevation of 1,121 metres (3,678 ft), and is near Yeongcheon.

The Bohyeon Mountain Starlight Festival takes place in summer and is centered in the Bohyunsan Optical Astronomy Observatory, which was established in 1996.

This observatory houses the third-largest telescope in Korea, which is the country's largest optical instrument. This 1.8-meter reflecting telescope was built near the peak. There is also a Bohyeon Mountain Science Museum, situated just below the observatory, run by the Yeongcheon City Government.

== See also ==
- List of mountains of Korea
- Bohyeonsa, temple in Yeongcheon
