= List of minor planets: 34001–35000 =

The following is a partial list of minor planets, running from minor-planet number 34001 through 35000, inclusive. The primary data for this and other partial lists is based on JPL's "Small-Body Orbital Elements" and data available from the Minor Planet Center. Critical list information is also provided by the MPC, unless otherwise specified from Lowell Observatory. A detailed description of the table's columns and additional sources are given on the main page including a complete list of every page in this series, and a statistical break-up on the dynamical classification of minor planets.

Also see the summary list of all named bodies in numerical and alphabetical order, and the corresponding naming citations for the number range of this particular list. New namings may only be added to this list after official publication, as the preannouncement of names is condemned by the Working Group for Small Bodies Nomenclature of the International Astronomical Union.

Near-Earth obj.	MBA (inner)	MBA (outer)	Centaur
Mars-crosser	MBA (middle)	Jupiter trojan	Trans-Neptunian obj.
Unclassified

== 34001–34100 ==
Designation			Discovery			Properties		Ref
Permanent	Provisional	Named after	Date	Site	Discoverer(s)	Category	Diam.	Ref
34001	2000 OR_{5}	—	July 24, 2000	Socorro	LINEAR	·	5.5 km	MPC · JPL
34002 Movsesian	2000 OD_{6}	Movsesian	July 24, 2000	Socorro	LINEAR	·	3.1 km	MPC · JPL
34003 Ivozell	2000 OU_{6}	Ivozell	July 29, 2000	Socorro	LINEAR	·	6.6 km	MPC · JPL
34004 Gregorini	2000 OS_{7}	Gregorini	July 30, 2000	Montelupo	M. Tombelli, D. Guidetti	NYS	7.5 km	MPC · JPL
34005	2000 OY_{7}	—	July 30, 2000	Socorro	LINEAR	·	6.0 km	MPC · JPL
34006	2000 OQ_{9}	—	July 31, 2000	Črni Vrh	Skvarč, J.	·	3.4 km	MPC · JPL
34007	2000 OS_{11}	—	July 23, 2000	Socorro	LINEAR	·	4.6 km	MPC · JPL
34008	2000 OB_{12}	—	July 23, 2000	Socorro	LINEAR	NYS	3.2 km	MPC · JPL
34009	2000 OX_{12}	—	July 23, 2000	Socorro	LINEAR	MAS	1.7 km	MPC · JPL
34010 Tassiloschwarz	2000 OH_{13}	Tassiloschwarz	July 23, 2000	Socorro	LINEAR	·	2.6 km	MPC · JPL
34011 Divyakranthi	2000 OK_{14}	Divyakranthi	July 23, 2000	Socorro	LINEAR	NYS	2.8 km	MPC · JPL
34012 Prashaant	2000 OD_{15}	Prashaant	July 23, 2000	Socorro	LINEAR	·	1.9 km	MPC · JPL
34013	2000 OG_{15}	—	July 23, 2000	Socorro	LINEAR	·	2.5 km	MPC · JPL
34014 Pingali	2000 OP_{15}	Pingali	July 23, 2000	Socorro	LINEAR	·	3.2 km	MPC · JPL
34015	2000 OR_{16}	—	July 23, 2000	Socorro	LINEAR	NYS	1.7 km	MPC · JPL
34016 Chaitanya	2000 OY_{16}	Chaitanya	July 23, 2000	Socorro	LINEAR	·	2.2 km	MPC · JPL
34017 Geeve	2000 OD_{17}	Geeve	July 23, 2000	Socorro	LINEAR	AST	6.4 km	MPC · JPL
34018	2000 OK_{19}	—	July 31, 2000	Socorro	LINEAR	·	4.4 km	MPC · JPL
34019	2000 OU_{19}	—	July 30, 2000	Socorro	LINEAR	MAR	4.4 km	MPC · JPL
34020	2000 ON_{21}	—	July 30, 2000	Socorro	LINEAR	PHO	3.4 km	MPC · JPL
34021 Suhanijain	2000 OW_{22}	Suhanijain	July 23, 2000	Socorro	LINEAR	·	2.2 km	MPC · JPL
34022	2000 OY_{23}	—	July 23, 2000	Socorro	LINEAR	·	8.4 km	MPC · JPL
34023	2000 OH_{24}	—	July 23, 2000	Socorro	LINEAR	(5)	3.8 km	MPC · JPL
34024 Cormaclarkin	2000 OO_{24}	Cormaclarkin	July 23, 2000	Socorro	LINEAR	NYS	4.2 km	MPC · JPL
34025 Caolannbrady	2000 OX_{24}	Caolannbrady	July 23, 2000	Socorro	LINEAR	·	2.7 km	MPC · JPL
34026 Valpagliarino	2000 OA_{25}	Valpagliarino	July 23, 2000	Socorro	LINEAR	NYS	3.2 km	MPC · JPL
34027	2000 OL_{25}	—	July 23, 2000	Socorro	LINEAR	·	3.1 km	MPC · JPL
34028 Wuhuiyi	2000 OP_{25}	Wuhuiyi	July 23, 2000	Socorro	LINEAR	·	2.4 km	MPC · JPL
34029	2000 OX_{25}	—	July 23, 2000	Socorro	LINEAR	·	5.0 km	MPC · JPL
34030 Tabuchi	2000 OM_{26}	Tabuchi	July 23, 2000	Socorro	LINEAR	·	3.3 km	MPC · JPL
34031 Fukumitsu	2000 OU_{26}	Fukumitsu	July 23, 2000	Socorro	LINEAR	NYS	3.8 km	MPC · JPL
34032	2000 OC_{27}	—	July 23, 2000	Socorro	LINEAR	·	4.4 km	MPC · JPL
34033	2000 OH_{27}	—	July 23, 2000	Socorro	LINEAR	EOS	8.2 km	MPC · JPL
34034 Shehadeh	2000 OQ_{27}	Shehadeh	July 23, 2000	Socorro	LINEAR	·	5.7 km	MPC · JPL
34035	2000 OV_{27}	—	July 23, 2000	Socorro	LINEAR	MAR	5.8 km	MPC · JPL
34036	2000 OX_{27}	—	July 23, 2000	Socorro	LINEAR	PHO	6.7 km	MPC · JPL
34037	2000 OZ_{27}	—	July 24, 2000	Socorro	LINEAR	MAR	3.9 km	MPC · JPL
34038 Abualragheb	2000 OA_{28}	Abualragheb	July 24, 2000	Socorro	LINEAR	·	2.0 km	MPC · JPL
34039 Torsteinvik	2000 OB_{29}	Torsteinvik	July 30, 2000	Socorro	LINEAR	·	3.2 km	MPC · JPL
34040	2000 OX_{30}	—	July 30, 2000	Socorro	LINEAR	GEF	7.9 km	MPC · JPL
34041	2000 OD_{31}	—	July 30, 2000	Socorro	LINEAR	EUN	3.6 km	MPC · JPL
34042 Espeseth	2000 OQ_{31}	Espeseth	July 30, 2000	Socorro	LINEAR	·	2.0 km	MPC · JPL
34043	2000 OS_{31}	—	July 30, 2000	Socorro	LINEAR	·	6.4 km	MPC · JPL
34044 Obafial	2000 OZ_{31}	Obafial	July 30, 2000	Socorro	LINEAR	·	2.5 km	MPC · JPL
34045	2000 OD_{34}	—	July 30, 2000	Socorro	LINEAR	slow	3.7 km	MPC · JPL
34046	2000 OQ_{34}	—	July 30, 2000	Socorro	LINEAR	EOS	5.2 km	MPC · JPL
34047 Gloria	2000 OJ_{35}	Gloria	July 30, 2000	Socorro	LINEAR	V	2.6 km	MPC · JPL
34048	2000 OR_{35}	—	July 31, 2000	Socorro	LINEAR	·	1.9 km	MPC · JPL
34049 Myrelleangela	2000 ON_{36}	Myrelleangela	July 30, 2000	Socorro	LINEAR	·	3.3 km	MPC · JPL
34050	2000 OU_{36}	—	July 30, 2000	Socorro	LINEAR	·	6.5 km	MPC · JPL
34051	2000 OK_{37}	—	July 30, 2000	Socorro	LINEAR	·	3.6 km	MPC · JPL
34052	2000 OL_{37}	—	July 30, 2000	Socorro	LINEAR	HNS	6.1 km	MPC · JPL
34053 Carlquines	2000 OF_{38}	Carlquines	July 30, 2000	Socorro	LINEAR	·	3.8 km	MPC · JPL
34054	2000 OE_{39}	—	July 30, 2000	Socorro	LINEAR	·	6.2 km	MPC · JPL
34055	2000 OU_{41}	—	July 30, 2000	Socorro	LINEAR	EUN	3.9 km	MPC · JPL
34056	2000 OJ_{42}	—	July 30, 2000	Socorro	LINEAR	·	5.1 km	MPC · JPL
34057	2000 ON_{44}	—	July 30, 2000	Socorro	LINEAR	EUN	5.5 km	MPC · JPL
34058	2000 OT_{44}	—	July 30, 2000	Socorro	LINEAR	·	4.1 km	MPC · JPL
34059	2000 OS_{45}	—	July 30, 2000	Socorro	LINEAR	EOS	5.2 km	MPC · JPL
34060	2000 OZ_{45}	—	July 30, 2000	Socorro	LINEAR	GEF	7.8 km	MPC · JPL
34061	2000 OC_{48}	—	July 31, 2000	Socorro	LINEAR	·	5.3 km	MPC · JPL
34062	2000 OD_{48}	—	July 31, 2000	Socorro	LINEAR	·	10 km	MPC · JPL
34063 Mariamakarova	2000 OA_{49}	Mariamakarova	July 31, 2000	Socorro	LINEAR	·	2.0 km	MPC · JPL
34064	2000 OK_{51}	—	July 30, 2000	Socorro	LINEAR	·	11 km	MPC · JPL
34065	2000 OD_{52}	—	July 31, 2000	Socorro	LINEAR	·	4.1 km	MPC · JPL
34066	2000 OS_{52}	—	July 31, 2000	Socorro	LINEAR	·	8.3 km	MPC · JPL
34067	2000 OA_{55}	—	July 29, 2000	Anderson Mesa	LONEOS	CYB	6.2 km	MPC · JPL
34068	2000 OB_{56}	—	July 29, 2000	Anderson Mesa	LONEOS	·	3.6 km	MPC · JPL
34069 Andrewsteele	2000 OZ_{56}	Andrewsteele	July 29, 2000	Anderson Mesa	LONEOS	VER	8.3 km	MPC · JPL
34070	2000 OK_{57}	—	July 29, 2000	Anderson Mesa	LONEOS	slow	6.0 km	MPC · JPL
34071	2000 OT_{57}	—	July 29, 2000	Anderson Mesa	LONEOS	·	4.1 km	MPC · JPL
34072	2000 OU_{58}	—	July 29, 2000	Anderson Mesa	LONEOS	·	1.8 km	MPC · JPL
34073	2000 OW_{58}	—	July 29, 2000	Anderson Mesa	LONEOS	·	4.2 km	MPC · JPL
34074	2000 OG_{59}	—	July 29, 2000	Anderson Mesa	LONEOS	NYS	3.1 km	MPC · JPL
34075	2000 OE_{60}	—	July 29, 2000	Anderson Mesa	LONEOS	HYG	8.5 km	MPC · JPL
34076	2000 OK_{60}	—	July 29, 2000	Anderson Mesa	LONEOS	·	3.9 km	MPC · JPL
34077 Yoshiakifuse	2000 OV_{68}	Yoshiakifuse	July 30, 2000	Cerro Tololo	M. W. Buie	·	2.9 km	MPC · JPL
34078	2000 PF	—	August 1, 2000	Črni Vrh	Skvarč, J.	·	6.6 km	MPC · JPL
34079 Samoylova	2000 PD_{1}	Samoylova	August 1, 2000	Socorro	LINEAR	V	2.4 km	MPC · JPL
34080 Clarakeng	2000 PE_{1}	Clarakeng	August 1, 2000	Socorro	LINEAR	·	4.1 km	MPC · JPL
34081 Chowkitmun	2000 PH_{1}	Chowkitmun	August 1, 2000	Socorro	LINEAR	V	2.5 km	MPC · JPL
34082	2000 PL_{2}	—	August 1, 2000	Socorro	LINEAR	·	7.4 km	MPC · JPL
34083 Feretova	2000 PE_{4}	Feretova	August 1, 2000	Socorro	LINEAR	·	2.7 km	MPC · JPL
34084	2000 PM_{4}	—	August 1, 2000	Socorro	LINEAR	·	3.3 km	MPC · JPL
34085	2000 PE_{5}	—	August 5, 2000	Haleakala	NEAT	·	3.9 km	MPC · JPL
34086	2000 PP_{5}	—	August 5, 2000	Prescott	P. G. Comba	V	2.8 km	MPC · JPL
34087	2000 PA_{7}	—	August 1, 2000	Črni Vrh	H. Mikuž, J. Skvarč	KOR	3.4 km	MPC · JPL
34088 Satokosuka	2000 PC_{7}	Satokosuka	August 6, 2000	Bisei SG Center	BATTeRS	·	2.3 km	MPC · JPL
34089 Smoter	2000 PL_{7}	Smoter	August 2, 2000	Socorro	LINEAR	·	3.1 km	MPC · JPL
34090 Cewhang	2000 PG_{10}	Cewhang	August 1, 2000	Socorro	LINEAR	·	2.2 km	MPC · JPL
34091	2000 PQ_{10}	—	August 1, 2000	Socorro	LINEAR	EOS	6.0 km	MPC · JPL
34092	2000 PF_{11}	—	August 1, 2000	Socorro	LINEAR	·	3.4 km	MPC · JPL
34093	2000 PP_{11}	—	August 1, 2000	Socorro	LINEAR	ADE	9.5 km	MPC · JPL
34094	2000 PV_{11}	—	August 1, 2000	Socorro	LINEAR	EUN	4.1 km	MPC · JPL
34095	2000 PW_{11}	—	August 1, 2000	Socorro	LINEAR	EUN	4.6 km	MPC · JPL
34096	2000 PC_{12}	—	August 1, 2000	Socorro	LINEAR	URS	9.2 km	MPC · JPL
34097	2000 PD_{12}	—	August 1, 2000	Socorro	LINEAR	·	10 km	MPC · JPL
34098	2000 PM_{12}	—	August 2, 2000	Socorro	LINEAR	VER ·	8.5 km	MPC · JPL
34099	2000 PT_{12}	—	August 8, 2000	Socorro	LINEAR	EOS	5.3 km	MPC · JPL
34100 Thapa	2000 PQ_{13}	Thapa	August 1, 2000	Socorro	LINEAR	V	2.3 km	MPC · JPL

== 34101–34200 ==
back to top

Designation			Discovery			Properties		Ref
Permanent	Provisional	Named after	Date	Site	Discoverer(s)	Category	Diam.	Ref
34101 Hesrivastava	2000 PT_{15}	Hesrivastava	August 1, 2000	Socorro	LINEAR	V	6.6 km	MPC · JPL
34102 Shawnzhang	2000 PO_{16}	Shawnzhang	August 1, 2000	Socorro	LINEAR	·	4.6 km	MPC · JPL
34103 Suganthkannan	2000 PP_{17}	Suganthkannan	August 1, 2000	Socorro	LINEAR	KOR	4.0 km	MPC · JPL
34104 Jeremiahpate	2000 PY_{19}	Jeremiahpate	August 1, 2000	Socorro	LINEAR	·	4.8 km	MPC · JPL
34105	2000 PD_{20}	—	August 1, 2000	Socorro	LINEAR	·	4.2 km	MPC · JPL
34106 Sakhrani	2000 PP_{22}	Sakhrani	August 2, 2000	Socorro	LINEAR	·	3.0 km	MPC · JPL
34107 Kashfiarahman	2000 PX_{22}	Kashfiarahman	August 2, 2000	Socorro	LINEAR	THM	5.5 km	MPC · JPL
34108	2000 PN_{23}	—	August 2, 2000	Socorro	LINEAR	·	6.2 km	MPC · JPL
34109	2000 PX_{23}	—	August 2, 2000	Socorro	LINEAR	NYS	2.4 km	MPC · JPL
34110	2000 PX_{24}	—	August 3, 2000	Socorro	LINEAR	EMA	9.4 km	MPC · JPL
34111	2000 PZ_{24}	—	August 3, 2000	Socorro	LINEAR	·	8.8 km	MPC · JPL
34112	2000 PC_{25}	—	August 3, 2000	Socorro	LINEAR	URS	8.3 km	MPC · JPL
34113	2000 PL_{25}	—	August 3, 2000	Kitt Peak	Spacewatch	·	2.3 km	MPC · JPL
34114	2000 PU_{26}	—	August 5, 2000	Haleakala	NEAT	EOS	6.5 km	MPC · JPL
34115	2000 PV_{26}	—	August 5, 2000	Haleakala	NEAT	·	8.7 km	MPC · JPL
34116	2000 PW_{26}	—	August 5, 2000	Haleakala	NEAT	·	14 km	MPC · JPL
34117	2000 PA_{27}	—	August 9, 2000	Socorro	LINEAR	·	2.8 km	MPC · JPL
34118	2000 PC_{27}	—	August 9, 2000	Socorro	LINEAR	·	2.7 km	MPC · JPL
34119	2000 PY_{27}	—	August 9, 2000	Socorro	LINEAR	·	20 km	MPC · JPL
34120	2000 PL_{28}	—	August 4, 2000	Haleakala	NEAT	·	2.4 km	MPC · JPL
34121	2000 PJ_{29}	—	August 1, 2000	Socorro	LINEAR	·	5.1 km	MPC · JPL
34122	2000 PQ_{29}	—	August 1, 2000	Socorro	LINEAR	·	2.8 km	MPC · JPL
34123 Uedayukika	2000 QD	Uedayukika	August 25, 2000	Bisei SG Center	BATTeRS	·	13 km	MPC · JPL
34124	2000 QS	—	August 22, 2000	Višnjan Observatory	K. Korlević, M. Jurić	·	5.9 km	MPC · JPL
34125 Biancospino	2000 QZ	Biancospino	August 23, 2000	Gnosca	S. Sposetti	THM	5.1 km	MPC · JPL
34126 Cornaa	2000 QA_{1}	Cornaa	August 23, 2000	Gnosca	S. Sposetti	·	5.5 km	MPC · JPL
34127 Adamnayak	2000 QN_{2}	Adamnayak	August 24, 2000	Socorro	LINEAR	·	3.8 km	MPC · JPL
34128 Hannahbrown	2000 QO_{2}	Hannahbrown	August 24, 2000	Socorro	LINEAR	EOS	5.1 km	MPC · JPL
34129 Madisonsneve	2000 QN_{3}	Madisonsneve	August 24, 2000	Socorro	LINEAR	KOR ·	4.1 km	MPC · JPL
34130 Isabellaivy	2000 QW_{3}	Isabellaivy	August 24, 2000	Socorro	LINEAR	V	2.5 km	MPC · JPL
34131	2000 QY_{3}	—	August 24, 2000	Socorro	LINEAR	·	2.3 km	MPC · JPL
34132 Theoguerin	2000 QX_{4}	Theoguerin	August 24, 2000	Socorro	LINEAR	·	4.6 km	MPC · JPL
34133 Charlesfenske	2000 QU_{5}	Charlesfenske	August 24, 2000	Socorro	LINEAR	·	7.7 km	MPC · JPL
34134 Zlokapa	2000 QW_{5}	Zlokapa	August 24, 2000	Socorro	LINEAR	·	3.1 km	MPC · JPL
34135 Rahulsubra	2000 QX_{5}	Rahulsubra	August 24, 2000	Socorro	LINEAR	THM	5.5 km	MPC · JPL
34136	2000 QF_{6}	—	August 24, 2000	Višnjan Observatory	K. Korlević, M. Jurić	·	2.7 km	MPC · JPL
34137 Lonnielinda	2000 QL_{6}	Lonnielinda	August 21, 2000	Terre Haute	Wolfe, C.	·	2.9 km	MPC · JPL
34138 Frasso Sabino	2000 QE_{9}	Frasso Sabino	August 25, 2000	Frasso Sabino	Sabino, Frasso	·	4.2 km	MPC · JPL
34139 Lucabarcelo	2000 QU_{10}	Lucabarcelo	August 24, 2000	Socorro	LINEAR	THM	7.4 km	MPC · JPL
34140	2000 QE_{11}	—	August 24, 2000	Socorro	LINEAR	·	4.2 km	MPC · JPL
34141 Antonwu	2000 QZ_{11}	Antonwu	August 24, 2000	Socorro	LINEAR	KOR	4.1 km	MPC · JPL
34142 Sachinkonan	2000 QE_{12}	Sachinkonan	August 24, 2000	Socorro	LINEAR	THM	5.2 km	MPC · JPL
34143 Heeric	2000 QE_{13}	Heeric	August 24, 2000	Socorro	LINEAR	·	2.9 km	MPC · JPL
34144 Alexandersun	2000 QX_{14}	Alexandersun	August 24, 2000	Socorro	LINEAR	·	2.1 km	MPC · JPL
34145	2000 QV_{15}	—	August 24, 2000	Socorro	LINEAR	·	6.4 km	MPC · JPL
34146	2000 QH_{16}	—	August 24, 2000	Socorro	LINEAR	·	8.4 km	MPC · JPL
34147 Vengadesan	2000 QV_{16}	Vengadesan	August 24, 2000	Socorro	LINEAR	·	4.7 km	MPC · JPL
34148 Marchuo	2000 QX_{16}	Marchuo	August 24, 2000	Socorro	LINEAR	·	3.1 km	MPC · JPL
34149	2000 QL_{17}	—	August 24, 2000	Socorro	LINEAR	NYS	1.7 km	MPC · JPL
34150	2000 QK_{18}	—	August 24, 2000	Socorro	LINEAR	·	2.5 km	MPC · JPL
34151	2000 QH_{19}	—	August 24, 2000	Socorro	LINEAR	·	2.2 km	MPC · JPL
34152 Kendrazhang	2000 QW_{19}	Kendrazhang	August 24, 2000	Socorro	LINEAR	·	5.4 km	MPC · JPL
34153 Deeannguo	2000 QZ_{19}	Deeannguo	August 24, 2000	Socorro	LINEAR	THM	5.4 km	MPC · JPL
34154 Anushkanair	2000 QC_{20}	Anushkanair	August 24, 2000	Socorro	LINEAR	NYS	3.7 km	MPC · JPL
34155	2000 QJ_{22}	—	August 25, 2000	Socorro	LINEAR	·	7.3 km	MPC · JPL
34156 Gopalakrishnan	2000 QT_{22}	Gopalakrishnan	August 25, 2000	Socorro	LINEAR	slow	3.0 km	MPC · JPL
34157	2000 QU_{22}	—	August 25, 2000	Socorro	LINEAR	·	1.9 km	MPC · JPL
34158 Rachelchang	2000 QB_{24}	Rachelchang	August 25, 2000	Socorro	LINEAR	KOR	3.1 km	MPC · JPL
34159 Ryanthorpe	2000 QJ_{24}	Ryanthorpe	August 25, 2000	Socorro	LINEAR	MRX	3.2 km	MPC · JPL
34160	2000 QS_{26}	—	August 26, 2000	Kleť	Kleť	·	3.2 km	MPC · JPL
34161 Michaellee	2000 QC_{27}	Michaellee	August 24, 2000	Socorro	LINEAR	·	1.9 km	MPC · JPL
34162 Yegnesh	2000 QV_{27}	Yegnesh	August 24, 2000	Socorro	LINEAR	KOR	3.8 km	MPC · JPL
34163 Neyveli	2000 QY_{27}	Neyveli	August 24, 2000	Socorro	LINEAR	·	2.3 km	MPC · JPL
34164 Anikacheerla	2000 QQ_{28}	Anikacheerla	August 24, 2000	Socorro	LINEAR	·	2.2 km	MPC · JPL
34165 Nikhilcheerla	2000 QW_{28}	Nikhilcheerla	August 24, 2000	Socorro	LINEAR	KOR	4.5 km	MPC · JPL
34166 Neildeshmukh	2000 QQ_{30}	Neildeshmukh	August 25, 2000	Socorro	LINEAR	V	3.6 km	MPC · JPL
34167	2000 QS_{30}	—	August 25, 2000	Socorro	LINEAR	EOS	6.6 km	MPC · JPL
34168	2000 QP_{31}	—	August 26, 2000	Socorro	LINEAR	·	1.9 km	MPC · JPL
34169	2000 QA_{33}	—	August 26, 2000	Socorro	LINEAR	·	3.7 km	MPC · JPL
34170	2000 QX_{33}	—	August 26, 2000	Prescott	P. G. Comba	·	6.5 km	MPC · JPL
34171	2000 QZ_{34}	—	August 26, 2000	Višnjan Observatory	K. Korlević, M. Jurić	·	2.7 km	MPC · JPL
34172 Camillemiles	2000 QU_{37}	Camillemiles	August 24, 2000	Socorro	LINEAR	·	4.5 km	MPC · JPL
34173	2000 QY_{37}	—	August 24, 2000	Socorro	LINEAR	·	6.8 km	MPC · JPL
34174	2000 QP_{38}	—	August 24, 2000	Socorro	LINEAR	·	9.4 km	MPC · JPL
34175 Joshuadong	2000 QG_{39}	Joshuadong	August 24, 2000	Socorro	LINEAR	·	6.7 km	MPC · JPL
34176 Balamurugan	2000 QT_{39}	Balamurugan	August 24, 2000	Socorro	LINEAR	·	4.8 km	MPC · JPL
34177 Amandawilson	2000 QD_{40}	Amandawilson	August 24, 2000	Socorro	LINEAR	KOR	3.9 km	MPC · JPL
34178 Sarahmarie	2000 QM_{41}	Sarahmarie	August 24, 2000	Socorro	LINEAR	PAD	4.0 km	MPC · JPL
34179 Bryanchun	2000 QT_{41}	Bryanchun	August 24, 2000	Socorro	LINEAR	·	4.2 km	MPC · JPL
34180 Jessicayoung	2000 QP_{42}	Jessicayoung	August 24, 2000	Socorro	LINEAR	·	4.5 km	MPC · JPL
34181 Patnaik	2000 QT_{42}	Patnaik	August 24, 2000	Socorro	LINEAR	NYS	3.1 km	MPC · JPL
34182 Sachan	2000 QC_{44}	Sachan	August 24, 2000	Socorro	LINEAR	·	4.0 km	MPC · JPL
34183 Yeshdoctor	2000 QG_{44}	Yeshdoctor	August 24, 2000	Socorro	LINEAR	THM	6.2 km	MPC · JPL
34184 Hegde	2000 QZ_{44}	Hegde	August 24, 2000	Socorro	LINEAR	·	4.8 km	MPC · JPL
34185	2000 QP_{47}	—	August 24, 2000	Socorro	LINEAR	·	4.6 km	MPC · JPL
34186	2000 QT_{47}	—	August 24, 2000	Socorro	LINEAR	·	7.2 km	MPC · JPL
34187 Tomaino	2000 QW_{47}	Tomaino	August 24, 2000	Socorro	LINEAR	·	6.8 km	MPC · JPL
34188 Clarawagner	2000 QB_{48}	Clarawagner	August 24, 2000	Socorro	LINEAR	·	4.6 km	MPC · JPL
34189 Ambatipudi	2000 QD_{48}	Ambatipudi	August 24, 2000	Socorro	LINEAR	·	4.9 km	MPC · JPL
34190 Erinsmith	2000 QA_{49}	Erinsmith	August 24, 2000	Socorro	LINEAR	·	4.3 km	MPC · JPL
34191 Jakhete	2000 QR_{49}	Jakhete	August 24, 2000	Socorro	LINEAR	·	3.4 km	MPC · JPL
34192 Sappington	2000 QE_{50}	Sappington	August 24, 2000	Socorro	LINEAR	·	6.2 km	MPC · JPL
34193 Annakoonce	2000 QT_{52}	Annakoonce	August 24, 2000	Socorro	LINEAR	·	7.2 km	MPC · JPL
34194 Serenajing	2000 QW_{52}	Serenajing	August 24, 2000	Socorro	LINEAR	·	4.3 km	MPC · JPL
34195	2000 QA_{54}	—	August 25, 2000	Socorro	LINEAR	·	5.4 km	MPC · JPL
34196	2000 QB_{54}	—	August 25, 2000	Socorro	LINEAR	·	7.5 km	MPC · JPL
34197 Susrinivasan	2000 QD_{54}	Susrinivasan	August 25, 2000	Socorro	LINEAR	·	2.9 km	MPC · JPL
34198 Oliverleitner	2000 QM_{54}	Oliverleitner	August 25, 2000	Socorro	LINEAR	·	2.7 km	MPC · JPL
34199 Amyjin	2000 QV_{54}	Amyjin	August 25, 2000	Socorro	LINEAR	·	1.8 km	MPC · JPL
34200 Emmasun	2000 QW_{54}	Emmasun	August 25, 2000	Socorro	LINEAR	NYS	2.2 km	MPC · JPL

== 34201–34300 ==
back to top

Designation			Discovery			Properties		Ref
Permanent	Provisional	Named after	Date	Site	Discoverer(s)	Category	Diam.	Ref
34201	2000 QX_{54}	—	August 25, 2000	Socorro	LINEAR	EOS	5.2 km	MPC · JPL
34202 Sionaprasad	2000 QB_{55}	Sionaprasad	August 25, 2000	Socorro	LINEAR	·	5.9 km	MPC · JPL
34203	2000 QO_{55}	—	August 25, 2000	Socorro	LINEAR	·	5.4 km	MPC · JPL
34204 Quryshi	2000 QR_{55}	Quryshi	August 25, 2000	Socorro	LINEAR	·	6.3 km	MPC · JPL
34205 Mizerak	2000 QR_{57}	Mizerak	August 26, 2000	Socorro	LINEAR	·	3.1 km	MPC · JPL
34206 Zhiyuewang	2000 QM_{60}	Zhiyuewang	August 26, 2000	Socorro	LINEAR	·	4.5 km	MPC · JPL
34207	2000 QR_{65}	—	August 28, 2000	Socorro	LINEAR	·	6.2 km	MPC · JPL
34208 Danielzhang	2000 QR_{66}	Danielzhang	August 28, 2000	Socorro	LINEAR	·	4.6 km	MPC · JPL
34209	2000 QP_{67}	—	August 28, 2000	Socorro	LINEAR	·	6.2 km	MPC · JPL
34210	2000 QV_{67}	—	August 28, 2000	Socorro	LINEAR	LIX	15 km	MPC · JPL
34211	2000 QE_{68}	—	August 28, 2000	Socorro	LINEAR	EOS	6.3 km	MPC · JPL
34212	2000 QZ_{68}	—	August 28, 2000	Reedy Creek	J. Broughton	·	6.3 km	MPC · JPL
34213	2000 QF_{69}	—	August 26, 2000	Kitt Peak	Spacewatch	EOS	3.9 km	MPC · JPL
34214	2000 QA_{72}	—	August 24, 2000	Socorro	LINEAR	EUN	3.4 km	MPC · JPL
34215 Stutigarg	2000 QD_{72}	Stutigarg	August 24, 2000	Socorro	LINEAR	·	3.3 km	MPC · JPL
34216	2000 QK_{75}	—	August 24, 2000	Socorro	LINEAR	·	12 km	MPC · JPL
34217	2000 QA_{78}	—	August 24, 2000	Socorro	LINEAR	·	3.3 km	MPC · JPL
34218 Padiyath	2000 QC_{78}	Padiyath	August 24, 2000	Socorro	LINEAR	·	6.9 km	MPC · JPL
34219 Megantang	2000 QM_{80}	Megantang	August 24, 2000	Socorro	LINEAR	·	4.1 km	MPC · JPL
34220 Pelagiamajoni	2000 QO_{84}	Pelagiamajoni	August 25, 2000	Socorro	LINEAR	·	3.3 km	MPC · JPL
34221	2000 QW_{84}	—	August 25, 2000	Socorro	LINEAR	EOS	5.5 km	MPC · JPL
34222	2000 QS_{85}	—	August 25, 2000	Socorro	LINEAR	·	4.5 km	MPC · JPL
34223	2000 QD_{87}	—	August 25, 2000	Socorro	LINEAR	EUN	3.7 km	MPC · JPL
34224 Maggiechen	2000 QG_{87}	Maggiechen	August 25, 2000	Socorro	LINEAR	·	2.8 km	MPC · JPL
34225 Fridberg	2000 QT_{87}	Fridberg	August 25, 2000	Socorro	LINEAR	·	6.8 km	MPC · JPL
34226	2000 QM_{88}	—	August 25, 2000	Socorro	LINEAR	·	3.9 km	MPC · JPL
34227 Daveyhuang	2000 QX_{89}	Daveyhuang	August 25, 2000	Socorro	LINEAR	·	2.2 km	MPC · JPL
34228	2000 QF_{90}	—	August 25, 2000	Socorro	LINEAR	LIX	10 km	MPC · JPL
34229	2000 QE_{92}	—	August 25, 2000	Socorro	LINEAR	·	2.0 km	MPC · JPL
34230	2000 QF_{93}	—	August 25, 2000	Socorro	LINEAR	·	13 km	MPC · JPL
34231 Isanisingh	2000 QL_{93}	Isanisingh	August 26, 2000	Socorro	LINEAR	EOS	3.5 km	MPC · JPL
34232	2000 QL_{94}	—	August 26, 2000	Socorro	LINEAR	EOS	5.7 km	MPC · JPL
34233 Caldwell	2000 QD_{95}	Caldwell	August 26, 2000	Socorro	LINEAR	·	4.2 km	MPC · JPL
34234 Andrewfang	2000 QS_{95}	Andrewfang	August 26, 2000	Socorro	LINEAR	·	2.4 km	MPC · JPL
34235 Ellafeiner	2000 QZ_{95}	Ellafeiner	August 28, 2000	Socorro	LINEAR	NYS	3.7 km	MPC · JPL
34236 Firester	2000 QJ_{96}	Firester	August 28, 2000	Socorro	LINEAR	KOR	5.9 km	MPC · JPL
34237 Sarahgao	2000 QO_{96}	Sarahgao	August 28, 2000	Socorro	LINEAR	·	4.7 km	MPC · JPL
34238	2000 QU_{96}	—	August 28, 2000	Socorro	LINEAR	·	5.4 km	MPC · JPL
34239 Louisgolowich	2000 QX_{96}	Louisgolowich	August 28, 2000	Socorro	LINEAR	·	3.4 km	MPC · JPL
34240 Charleyhutch	2000 QP_{98}	Charleyhutch	August 28, 2000	Socorro	LINEAR	EOS	4.0 km	MPC · JPL
34241 Skylerjones	2000 QZ_{98}	Skylerjones	August 28, 2000	Socorro	LINEAR	·	6.0 km	MPC · JPL
34242	2000 QD_{100}	—	August 28, 2000	Socorro	LINEAR	·	2.6 km	MPC · JPL
34243	2000 QR_{100}	—	August 28, 2000	Socorro	LINEAR	EOS	7.2 km	MPC · JPL
34244	2000 QF_{101}	—	August 28, 2000	Socorro	LINEAR	·	4.6 km	MPC · JPL
34245 Andrewkomo	2000 QG_{101}	Andrewkomo	August 28, 2000	Socorro	LINEAR	slow	2.5 km	MPC · JPL
34246 Kopparapu	2000 QO_{102}	Kopparapu	August 28, 2000	Socorro	LINEAR	·	1.9 km	MPC · JPL
34247	2000 QC_{103}	—	August 28, 2000	Socorro	LINEAR	EOS	6.2 km	MPC · JPL
34248	2000 QE_{104}	—	August 28, 2000	Socorro	LINEAR	EOS	5.9 km	MPC · JPL
34249 Leolo	2000 QY_{108}	Leolo	August 29, 2000	Socorro	LINEAR	·	4.7 km	MPC · JPL
34250 Mamichael	2000 QA_{112}	Mamichael	August 24, 2000	Socorro	LINEAR	·	3.9 km	MPC · JPL
34251 Rohanmehrotra	2000 QR_{112}	Rohanmehrotra	August 24, 2000	Socorro	LINEAR	·	2.7 km	MPC · JPL
34252 Orlovsky	2000 QE_{113}	Orlovsky	August 24, 2000	Socorro	LINEAR	·	2.9 km	MPC · JPL
34253 Nitya	2000 QH_{114}	Nitya	August 24, 2000	Socorro	LINEAR	AGN	2.1 km	MPC · JPL
34254 Mihirpatel	2000 QN_{114}	Mihirpatel	August 24, 2000	Socorro	LINEAR	HYG	7.9 km	MPC · JPL
34255	2000 QR_{115}	—	August 25, 2000	Socorro	LINEAR	EOS	5.9 km	MPC · JPL
34256 Advaitpatil	2000 QK_{116}	Advaitpatil	August 28, 2000	Socorro	LINEAR	KOR	3.5 km	MPC · JPL
34257	2000 QU_{116}	—	August 28, 2000	Socorro	LINEAR	·	7.3 km	MPC · JPL
34258 Pentland	2000 QO_{119}	Pentland	August 25, 2000	Socorro	LINEAR	GEF	3.8 km	MPC · JPL
34259 Abprabhakaran	2000 QS_{119}	Abprabhakaran	August 25, 2000	Socorro	LINEAR	·	1.9 km	MPC · JPL
34260	2000 QG_{120}	—	August 25, 2000	Socorro	LINEAR	HYG	10 km	MPC · JPL
34261 Musharahman	2000 QK_{120}	Musharahman	August 25, 2000	Socorro	LINEAR	·	2.6 km	MPC · JPL
34262 Michaelren	2000 QP_{120}	Michaelren	August 25, 2000	Socorro	LINEAR	·	6.6 km	MPC · JPL
34263	2000 QV_{121}	—	August 25, 2000	Socorro	LINEAR	·	6.9 km	MPC · JPL
34264 Sadhuka	2000 QN_{124}	Sadhuka	August 28, 2000	Socorro	LINEAR	·	4.4 km	MPC · JPL
34265	2000 QC_{125}	—	August 29, 2000	Socorro	LINEAR	·	6.0 km	MPC · JPL
34266 Schweinfurth	2000 QF_{125}	Schweinfurth	August 31, 2000	Socorro	LINEAR	·	2.8 km	MPC · JPL
34267 Haniya	2000 QC_{126}	Haniya	August 31, 2000	Socorro	LINEAR	·	3.9 km	MPC · JPL
34268 Gracetian	2000 QP_{128}	Gracetian	August 25, 2000	Socorro	LINEAR	·	8.8 km	MPC · JPL
34269	2000 QV_{130}	—	August 24, 2000	Socorro	LINEAR	·	4.8 km	MPC · JPL
34270	2000 QW_{131}	—	August 25, 2000	Socorro	LINEAR	·	6.9 km	MPC · JPL
34271 Vinjaivale	2000 QH_{132}	Vinjaivale	August 26, 2000	Socorro	LINEAR	·	3.3 km	MPC · JPL
34272 Veeramacheneni	2000 QQ_{132}	Veeramacheneni	August 26, 2000	Socorro	LINEAR	·	3.0 km	MPC · JPL
34273 Franklynwang	2000 QS_{134}	Franklynwang	August 26, 2000	Socorro	LINEAR	·	4.3 km	MPC · JPL
34274	2000 QM_{135}	—	August 26, 2000	Socorro	LINEAR	MAR	4.0 km	MPC · JPL
34275	2000 QE_{136}	—	August 28, 2000	Socorro	LINEAR	URS ·	5.2 km	MPC · JPL
34276	2000 QW_{136}	—	August 29, 2000	Socorro	LINEAR	·	2.2 km	MPC · JPL
34277 Davidxingwu	2000 QH_{138}	Davidxingwu	August 31, 2000	Socorro	LINEAR	KOR	3.4 km	MPC · JPL
34278 Justinxie	2000 QE_{139}	Justinxie	August 31, 2000	Socorro	LINEAR	·	6.3 km	MPC · JPL
34279 Alicezhang	2000 QJ_{139}	Alicezhang	August 31, 2000	Socorro	LINEAR	·	5.6 km	MPC · JPL
34280 Victoradler	2000 QP_{140}	Victoradler	August 31, 2000	Socorro	LINEAR	·	2.8 km	MPC · JPL
34281 Albritton	2000 QR_{141}	Albritton	August 31, 2000	Socorro	LINEAR	·	6.9 km	MPC · JPL
34282 Applegate	2000 QX_{142}	Applegate	August 31, 2000	Socorro	LINEAR	AGN	4.4 km	MPC · JPL
34283 Bagley	2000 QM_{146}	Bagley	August 31, 2000	Socorro	LINEAR	V	2.6 km	MPC · JPL
34284 Seancampbell	2000 QR_{146}	Seancampbell	August 31, 2000	Socorro	LINEAR	·	2.1 km	MPC · JPL
34285 Dorothydady	2000 QA_{147}	Dorothydady	August 31, 2000	Socorro	LINEAR	·	2.4 km	MPC · JPL
34286	2000 QF_{147}	—	August 31, 2000	Socorro	LINEAR	EUN	5.5 km	MPC · JPL
34287	2000 QG_{147}	—	August 31, 2000	Socorro	LINEAR	EOS	9.0 km	MPC · JPL
34288 Bevindaglen	2000 QU_{149}	Bevindaglen	August 25, 2000	Socorro	LINEAR	·	2.3 km	MPC · JPL
34289 Johndell	2000 QC_{150}	Johndell	August 25, 2000	Socorro	LINEAR	·	3.4 km	MPC · JPL
34290	2000 QQ_{150}	—	August 25, 2000	Socorro	LINEAR	EOS	7.5 km	MPC · JPL
34291	2000 QS_{150}	—	August 25, 2000	Socorro	LINEAR	EOS · slow	12 km	MPC · JPL
34292	2000 QK_{151}	—	August 25, 2000	Socorro	LINEAR	EOS	6.2 km	MPC · JPL
34293 Khiemdoba	2000 QJ_{152}	Khiemdoba	August 29, 2000	Socorro	LINEAR	V	1.9 km	MPC · JPL
34294 Taylordufford	2000 QM_{152}	Taylordufford	August 29, 2000	Socorro	LINEAR	·	5.4 km	MPC · JPL
34295	2000 QN_{152}	—	August 29, 2000	Socorro	LINEAR	·	3.2 km	MPC · JPL
34296	2000 QT_{153}	—	August 29, 2000	Socorro	LINEAR	·	1.8 km	MPC · JPL
34297 Willfrazer	2000 QH_{156}	Willfrazer	August 31, 2000	Socorro	LINEAR	·	3.2 km	MPC · JPL
34298	2000 QH_{159}	—	August 31, 2000	Socorro	LINEAR	L5	17 km	MPC · JPL
34299	2000 QF_{162}	—	August 31, 2000	Socorro	LINEAR	·	6.8 km	MPC · JPL
34300 Brendafrost	2000 QV_{166}	Brendafrost	August 31, 2000	Socorro	LINEAR	HYG	7.5 km	MPC · JPL

== 34301–34400 ==
back to top

Designation			Discovery			Properties		Ref
Permanent	Provisional	Named after	Date	Site	Discoverer(s)	Category	Diam.	Ref
34301	2000 QO_{171}	—	August 31, 2000	Socorro	LINEAR	PAD	5.4 km	MPC · JPL
34302 Riagalanos	2000 QU_{172}	Riagalanos	August 31, 2000	Socorro	LINEAR	·	3.2 km	MPC · JPL
34303	2000 QN_{173}	—	August 31, 2000	Socorro	LINEAR	·	1.4 km	MPC · JPL
34304 Alainagarza	2000 QB_{178}	Alainagarza	August 31, 2000	Socorro	LINEAR	·	4.5 km	MPC · JPL
34305	2000 QN_{179}	—	August 31, 2000	Socorro	LINEAR	·	9.4 km	MPC · JPL
34306	2000 QP_{183}	—	August 25, 2000	Socorro	LINEAR	NYS	3.1 km	MPC · JPL
34307 Arielhaas	2000 QT_{183}	Arielhaas	August 26, 2000	Socorro	LINEAR	·	4.2 km	MPC · JPL
34308 Roberthall	2000 QC_{185}	Roberthall	August 26, 2000	Socorro	LINEAR	·	5.7 km	MPC · JPL
34309	2000 QY_{186}	—	August 26, 2000	Socorro	LINEAR	·	12 km	MPC · JPL
34310 Markhannum	2000 QA_{187}	Markhannum	August 26, 2000	Socorro	LINEAR	AGN	2.4 km	MPC · JPL
34311	2000 QE_{188}	—	August 26, 2000	Socorro	LINEAR	EOS	5.3 km	MPC · JPL
34312 Deahaupt	2000 QO_{188}	Deahaupt	August 26, 2000	Socorro	LINEAR	KOR	3.5 km	MPC · JPL
34313 Lisahevner	2000 QQ_{188}	Lisahevner	August 26, 2000	Socorro	LINEAR	V	1.9 km	MPC · JPL
34314 Jasonlee	2000 QN_{189}	Jasonlee	August 26, 2000	Socorro	LINEAR	slow	7.1 km	MPC · JPL
34315	2000 QJ_{190}	—	August 26, 2000	Socorro	LINEAR	·	6.3 km	MPC · JPL
34316 Christineleo	2000 QS_{190}	Christineleo	August 26, 2000	Socorro	LINEAR	·	2.5 km	MPC · JPL
34317 Fabianmak	2000 QH_{191}	Fabianmak	August 26, 2000	Socorro	LINEAR	·	6.6 km	MPC · JPL
34318	2000 QV_{192}	—	August 26, 2000	Socorro	LINEAR	·	8.4 km	MPC · JPL
34319 Neilmilburn	2000 QD_{193}	Neilmilburn	August 29, 2000	Socorro	LINEAR	·	6.5 km	MPC · JPL
34320 Davidmonge	2000 QU_{195}	Davidmonge	August 26, 2000	Socorro	LINEAR	HYG	8.5 km	MPC · JPL
34321 Russellmotter	2000 QY_{195}	Russellmotter	August 28, 2000	Socorro	LINEAR	·	4.9 km	MPC · JPL
34322 Marknandor	2000 QW_{196}	Marknandor	August 29, 2000	Socorro	LINEAR	·	2.4 km	MPC · JPL
34323 Williamrose	2000 QN_{198}	Williamrose	August 29, 2000	Socorro	LINEAR	·	5.3 km	MPC · JPL
34324 Jeremyschwartz	2000 QB_{199}	Jeremyschwartz	August 29, 2000	Socorro	LINEAR	KOR	3.4 km	MPC · JPL
34325 Terrencevale	2000 QN_{201}	Terrencevale	August 29, 2000	Socorro	LINEAR	·	5.8 km	MPC · JPL
34326 Zhaurova	2000 QF_{202}	Zhaurova	August 29, 2000	Socorro	LINEAR	NYS ·	6.6 km	MPC · JPL
34327	2000 QS_{203}	—	August 29, 2000	Socorro	LINEAR	·	5.0 km	MPC · JPL
34328 Jackalbright	2000 QR_{204}	Jackalbright	August 31, 2000	Socorro	LINEAR	PAD	4.9 km	MPC · JPL
34329 Sribhimaraju	2000 QO_{206}	Sribhimaraju	August 31, 2000	Socorro	LINEAR	·	6.3 km	MPC · JPL
34330 Bissoondial	2000 QB_{209}	Bissoondial	August 31, 2000	Socorro	LINEAR	·	2.6 km	MPC · JPL
34331 Annadu	2000 QH_{209}	Annadu	August 31, 2000	Socorro	LINEAR	NYS	2.2 km	MPC · JPL
34332 Alicefeng	2000 QU_{209}	Alicefeng	August 31, 2000	Socorro	LINEAR	·	4.8 km	MPC · JPL
34333 Roycorgross	2000 QG_{211}	Roycorgross	August 31, 2000	Socorro	LINEAR	·	5.6 km	MPC · JPL
34334 Georgiagrace	2000 QG_{212}	Georgiagrace	August 31, 2000	Socorro	LINEAR	KOR	3.7 km	MPC · JPL
34335 Ahmadismail	2000 QR_{214}	Ahmadismail	August 31, 2000	Socorro	LINEAR	MRX	3.0 km	MPC · JPL
34336 Willjenkins	2000 QT_{214}	Willjenkins	August 31, 2000	Socorro	LINEAR	KOR	3.9 km	MPC · JPL
34337 Mihirjoshi	2000 QR_{215}	Mihirjoshi	August 31, 2000	Socorro	LINEAR	NYS	5.5 km	MPC · JPL
34338 Shreyaskar	2000 QM_{216}	Shreyaskar	August 31, 2000	Socorro	LINEAR	·	5.5 km	MPC · JPL
34339	2000 QH_{218}	—	August 28, 2000	Socorro	LINEAR	LIX	11 km	MPC · JPL
34340	2000 QN_{224}	—	August 26, 2000	Kitt Peak	Spacewatch	·	5.0 km	MPC · JPL
34341	2000 QW_{224}	—	August 26, 2000	Haleakala	NEAT	V	2.4 km	MPC · JPL
34342 Asmikumar	2000 QK_{227}	Asmikumar	August 31, 2000	Socorro	LINEAR	GEF	3.3 km	MPC · JPL
34343 Kumaran	2000 QU_{227}	Kumaran	August 31, 2000	Socorro	LINEAR	·	2.8 km	MPC · JPL
34344	2000 QP_{229}	—	August 31, 2000	Socorro	LINEAR	·	9.3 km	MPC · JPL
34345 Gabriellalui	2000 RY	Gabriellalui	September 1, 2000	Socorro	LINEAR	·	3.9 km	MPC · JPL
34346 Varunmadan	2000 RJ_{1}	Varunmadan	September 1, 2000	Socorro	LINEAR	·	5.9 km	MPC · JPL
34347	2000 RN_{1}	—	September 1, 2000	Socorro	LINEAR	EUN	3.9 km	MPC · JPL
34348	2000 RF_{3}	—	September 1, 2000	Socorro	LINEAR	EUN	5.9 km	MPC · JPL
34349	2000 RQ_{7}	—	September 1, 2000	Socorro	LINEAR	·	10 km	MPC · JPL
34350	2000 RW_{7}	—	September 1, 2000	Socorro	LINEAR	·	8.7 km	MPC · JPL
34351 Decatur	2000 RZ_{8}	Decatur	September 3, 2000	Emerald Lane	L. Ball	KOR ·	3.5 km	MPC · JPL
34352	2000 RJ_{13}	—	September 1, 2000	Socorro	LINEAR	HYG	8.4 km	MPC · JPL
34353	2000 RX_{17}	—	September 1, 2000	Socorro	LINEAR	V	3.0 km	MPC · JPL
34354 Johnmadland	2000 RL_{18}	Johnmadland	September 1, 2000	Socorro	LINEAR	V	2.9 km	MPC · JPL
34355 Mefford	2000 RB_{20}	Mefford	September 1, 2000	Socorro	LINEAR	PAD	3.9 km	MPC · JPL
34356 Gahamuriel	2000 RR_{20}	Gahamuriel	September 1, 2000	Socorro	LINEAR	·	6.0 km	MPC · JPL
34357 Amaraorth	2000 RO_{21}	Amaraorth	September 1, 2000	Socorro	LINEAR	EOS	4.5 km	MPC · JPL
34358	2000 RV_{22}	—	September 1, 2000	Socorro	LINEAR	EOS	5.6 km	MPC · JPL
34359	2000 RN_{26}	—	September 1, 2000	Socorro	LINEAR	·	9.9 km	MPC · JPL
34360	2000 RS_{28}	—	September 1, 2000	Socorro	LINEAR	EOS · slow	5.9 km	MPC · JPL
34361	2000 RT_{28}	—	September 1, 2000	Socorro	LINEAR	·	8.9 km	MPC · JPL
34362	2000 RK_{30}	—	September 1, 2000	Socorro	LINEAR	EOS · slow	7.3 km	MPC · JPL
34363 Prawira	2000 RT_{30}	Prawira	September 1, 2000	Socorro	LINEAR	·	2.1 km	MPC · JPL
34364 Katequinn	2000 RZ_{30}	Katequinn	September 1, 2000	Socorro	LINEAR	VER	8.7 km	MPC · JPL
34365 Laurareilly	2000 RS_{34}	Laurareilly	September 1, 2000	Socorro	LINEAR	·	2.7 km	MPC · JPL
34366 Rosavestal	2000 RP_{36}	Rosavestal	September 4, 2000	Palmer Divide	B. D. Warner	·	7.6 km	MPC · JPL
34367 Kennedyrogers	2000 RQ_{40}	Kennedyrogers	September 3, 2000	Socorro	LINEAR	·	4.2 km	MPC · JPL
34368	2000 RA_{41}	—	September 3, 2000	Socorro	LINEAR	·	14 km	MPC · JPL
34369	2000 RA_{42}	—	September 3, 2000	Socorro	LINEAR	EOS	9.2 km	MPC · JPL
34370	2000 RY_{42}	—	September 3, 2000	Socorro	LINEAR	EOS	5.6 km	MPC · JPL
34371	2000 RC_{43}	—	September 3, 2000	Socorro	LINEAR	·	14 km	MPC · JPL
34372 Bentleysiems	2000 RS_{44}	Bentleysiems	September 3, 2000	Socorro	LINEAR	·	4.5 km	MPC · JPL
34373	2000 RT_{44}	—	September 3, 2000	Socorro	LINEAR	·	6.4 km	MPC · JPL
34374	2000 RP_{48}	—	September 3, 2000	Socorro	LINEAR	EOS	6.6 km	MPC · JPL
34375	2000 RP_{49}	—	September 5, 2000	Socorro	LINEAR	·	7.3 km	MPC · JPL
34376	2000 RO_{54}	—	September 3, 2000	Socorro	LINEAR	EOS	7.5 km	MPC · JPL
34377	2000 RQ_{54}	—	September 3, 2000	Socorro	LINEAR	·	5.0 km	MPC · JPL
34378	2000 RV_{54}	—	September 3, 2000	Socorro	LINEAR	EOS	6.9 km	MPC · JPL
34379 Slettnes	2000 RU_{55}	Slettnes	September 5, 2000	Socorro	LINEAR	GEF	3.5 km	MPC · JPL
34380 Pratikvangal	2000 RV_{55}	Pratikvangal	September 5, 2000	Socorro	LINEAR	(29841)	2.2 km	MPC · JPL
34381	2000 RW_{55}	—	September 5, 2000	Socorro	LINEAR	·	8.1 km	MPC · JPL
34382	2000 RG_{56}	—	September 6, 2000	Socorro	LINEAR	·	4.7 km	MPC · JPL
34383	2000 RH_{56}	—	September 6, 2000	Socorro	LINEAR	EOS	4.6 km	MPC · JPL
34384	2000 RW_{61}	—	September 1, 2000	Socorro	LINEAR	·	8.6 km	MPC · JPL
34385	2000 RE_{62}	—	September 1, 2000	Socorro	LINEAR	·	6.4 km	MPC · JPL
34386	2000 RP_{62}	—	September 1, 2000	Socorro	LINEAR	·	11 km	MPC · JPL
34387 Venkatesh	2000 RX_{62}	Venkatesh	September 2, 2000	Socorro	LINEAR	·	2.0 km	MPC · JPL
34388 Wylonis	2000 RE_{63}	Wylonis	September 2, 2000	Socorro	LINEAR	·	2.3 km	MPC · JPL
34389	2000 RJ_{65}	—	September 1, 2000	Socorro	LINEAR	·	7.4 km	MPC · JPL
34390	2000 RJ_{66}	—	September 1, 2000	Socorro	LINEAR	EUN	5.2 km	MPC · JPL
34391 Garyzhan	2000 RX_{67}	Garyzhan	September 2, 2000	Socorro	LINEAR	·	3.8 km	MPC · JPL
34392 Afroz	2000 RT_{68}	Afroz	September 2, 2000	Socorro	LINEAR	MAS	2.8 km	MPC · JPL
34393 Cindyallen	2000 RL_{69}	Cindyallen	September 2, 2000	Socorro	LINEAR	THM	6.4 km	MPC · JPL
34394	2000 RC_{70}	—	September 2, 2000	Socorro	LINEAR	EOS	4.6 km	MPC · JPL
34395	2000 RS_{73}	—	September 2, 2000	Socorro	LINEAR	·	6.3 km	MPC · JPL
34396	2000 RT_{74}	—	September 3, 2000	Socorro	LINEAR	HYG	6.4 km	MPC · JPL
34397 Rosaliebarber	2000 RJ_{76}	Rosaliebarber	September 4, 2000	Socorro	LINEAR	KOR	3.2 km	MPC · JPL
34398 Terryschmidt	2000 RK_{78}	Terryschmidt	September 9, 2000	Palmer Divide	B. D. Warner	·	5.0 km	MPC · JPL
34399 Hachiojihigashi	2000 RD_{79}	Hachiojihigashi	September 7, 2000	Bisei SG Center	BATTeRS	·	7.4 km	MPC · JPL
34400 Kimbaxter	2000 RC_{81}	Kimbaxter	September 1, 2000	Socorro	LINEAR	·	6.6 km	MPC · JPL

== 34401–34500 ==
back to top

Designation			Discovery			Properties		Ref
Permanent	Provisional	Named after	Date	Site	Discoverer(s)	Category	Diam.	Ref
34401 Kaibeecher	2000 RS_{83}	Kaibeecher	September 1, 2000	Socorro	LINEAR	·	3.6 km	MPC · JPL
34402 Seamusanderson	2000 RW_{84}	Seamusanderson	September 2, 2000	Anderson Mesa	LONEOS	NYS ·	6.2 km	MPC · JPL
34403 Sessin	2000 RP_{85}	Sessin	September 2, 2000	Anderson Mesa	LONEOS	KOR	3.6 km	MPC · JPL
34404 Jaybuddi	2000 RZ_{85}	Jaybuddi	September 2, 2000	Socorro	LINEAR	·	2.3 km	MPC · JPL
34405 Caitlinshearer	2000 RU_{86}	Caitlinshearer	September 2, 2000	Anderson Mesa	LONEOS	·	5.4 km	MPC · JPL
34406 Kristenconn	2000 RD_{92}	Kristenconn	September 3, 2000	Socorro	LINEAR	·	2.4 km	MPC · JPL
34407	2000 RD_{93}	—	September 3, 2000	Socorro	LINEAR	·	6.1 km	MPC · JPL
34408 Simonanghel	2000 RX_{94}	Simonanghel	September 4, 2000	Anderson Mesa	LONEOS	·	5.0 km	MPC · JPL
34409 Venturini	2000 RB_{95}	Venturini	September 4, 2000	Anderson Mesa	LONEOS	EOS	5.2 km	MPC · JPL
34410	2000 RT_{95}	—	September 4, 2000	Anderson Mesa	LONEOS	HOF	7.3 km	MPC · JPL
34411	2000 RR_{96}	—	September 4, 2000	Anderson Mesa	LONEOS	SYL · CYB	13 km	MPC · JPL
34412 Tamicruz	2000 RG_{100}	Tamicruz	September 5, 2000	Socorro	LINEAR	KOR	4.6 km	MPC · JPL
34413	2000 RS_{101}	—	September 5, 2000	Anderson Mesa	LONEOS	·	8.0 km	MPC · JPL
34414 MacLennan	2000 RQ_{103}	MacLennan	September 5, 2000	Anderson Mesa	LONEOS	·	6.5 km	MPC · JPL
34415 Racheldragos	2000 RV_{103}	Racheldragos	September 6, 2000	Socorro	LINEAR	·	7.1 km	MPC · JPL
34416	2000 RV_{104}	—	September 6, 2000	Socorro	LINEAR	·	4.3 km	MPC · JPL
34417	2000 RE_{105}	—	September 7, 2000	Socorro	LINEAR	EUN	4.5 km	MPC · JPL
34418 Juliegodfrey	2000 SO_{3}	Juliegodfrey	September 20, 2000	Socorro	LINEAR	·	2.5 km	MPC · JPL
34419 Corning	2000 SA_{7}	Corning	September 20, 2000	Elmira	Cecce, A. J.	·	3.6 km	MPC · JPL
34420 Peterpau	2000 SC_{7}	Peterpau	September 23, 2000	Desert Beaver	W. K. Y. Yeung	HYG	8.5 km	MPC · JPL
34421	2000 SA_{12}	—	September 20, 2000	Socorro	LINEAR	·	7.0 km	MPC · JPL
34422	2000 SX_{14}	—	September 23, 2000	Socorro	LINEAR	EUN	4.4 km	MPC · JPL
34423	2000 SF_{20}	—	September 23, 2000	Socorro	LINEAR	·	7.1 km	MPC · JPL
34424 Utashima	2000 SA_{21}	Utashima	September 24, 2000	Bisei SG Center	BATTeRS	EOS	4.9 km	MPC · JPL
34425	2000 SP_{22}	—	September 20, 2000	Haleakala	NEAT	·	4.3 km	MPC · JPL
34426	2000 SS_{22}	—	September 20, 2000	Haleakala	NEAT	THM	10 km	MPC · JPL
34427	2000 SN_{23}	—	September 26, 2000	Višnjan Observatory	K. Korlević	EOS	6.1 km	MPC · JPL
34428	2000 SA_{27}	—	September 23, 2000	Socorro	LINEAR	·	10 km	MPC · JPL
34429	2000 SC_{27}	—	September 23, 2000	Socorro	LINEAR	·	4.5 km	MPC · JPL
34430	2000 SJ_{29}	—	September 24, 2000	Socorro	LINEAR	HYG	8.1 km	MPC · JPL
34431	2000 SZ_{33}	—	September 24, 2000	Socorro	LINEAR	·	5.8 km	MPC · JPL
34432 Groebe	2000 SF_{36}	Groebe	September 24, 2000	Socorro	LINEAR	KOR	3.5 km	MPC · JPL
34433 Kavars	2000 SE_{37}	Kavars	September 24, 2000	Socorro	LINEAR	THM	6.1 km	MPC · JPL
34434	2000 SE_{39}	—	September 24, 2000	Socorro	LINEAR	PAD	8.7 km	MPC · JPL
34435	2000 SR_{39}	—	September 24, 2000	Socorro	LINEAR	EUN	3.5 km	MPC · JPL
34436	2000 SE_{40}	—	September 24, 2000	Socorro	LINEAR	·	5.6 km	MPC · JPL
34437	2000 SF_{43}	—	September 26, 2000	Črni Vrh	Mikuž, H.	·	5.2 km	MPC · JPL
34438	2000 SV_{44}	—	September 26, 2000	Nachi-Katsuura	Y. Shimizu, T. Urata	V	3.5 km	MPC · JPL
34439	2000 SG_{45}	—	September 21, 2000	Socorro	LINEAR	·	14 km	MPC · JPL
34440	2000 SV_{46}	—	September 23, 2000	Socorro	LINEAR	·	17 km	MPC · JPL
34441 Thomaslee	2000 SZ_{60}	Thomaslee	September 24, 2000	Socorro	LINEAR	·	6.7 km	MPC · JPL
34442	2000 SS_{64}	—	September 24, 2000	Socorro	LINEAR	·	5.0 km	MPC · JPL
34443 Markmadland	2000 ST_{70}	Markmadland	September 24, 2000	Socorro	LINEAR	KOR	3.0 km	MPC · JPL
34444 Kellmcallister	2000 SW_{73}	Kellmcallister	September 24, 2000	Socorro	LINEAR	V	2.5 km	MPC · JPL
34445	2000 SX_{73}	—	September 24, 2000	Socorro	LINEAR	EUN	3.4 km	MPC · JPL
34446 Karenmccoy	2000 SN_{74}	Karenmccoy	September 24, 2000	Socorro	LINEAR	V	2.7 km	MPC · JPL
34447 Mesidor	2000 SU_{74}	Mesidor	September 24, 2000	Socorro	LINEAR	·	7.5 km	MPC · JPL
34448	2000 SC_{78}	—	September 24, 2000	Socorro	LINEAR	EOS	5.8 km	MPC · JPL
34449	2000 SJ_{79}	—	September 24, 2000	Socorro	LINEAR	THM	7.5 km	MPC · JPL
34450 Zashamickey	2000 SZ_{80}	Zashamickey	September 24, 2000	Socorro	LINEAR	·	2.1 km	MPC · JPL
34451 Rebohearn	2000 SY_{82}	Rebohearn	September 24, 2000	Socorro	LINEAR	·	3.3 km	MPC · JPL
34452 Jenniparker	2000 SS_{83}	Jenniparker	September 24, 2000	Socorro	LINEAR	·	4.8 km	MPC · JPL
34453 Elisapeters	2000 SG_{84}	Elisapeters	September 24, 2000	Socorro	LINEAR	KOR	3.1 km	MPC · JPL
34454	2000 SB_{86}	—	September 24, 2000	Socorro	LINEAR	·	6.3 km	MPC · JPL
34455	2000 SW_{87}	—	September 24, 2000	Socorro	LINEAR	·	11 km	MPC · JPL
34456 Lydiareznik	2000 SG_{88}	Lydiareznik	September 24, 2000	Socorro	LINEAR	·	7.3 km	MPC · JPL
34457 Leahroberts	2000 SW_{88}	Leahroberts	September 24, 2000	Socorro	LINEAR	·	4.3 km	MPC · JPL
34458	2000 ST_{90}	—	September 22, 2000	Socorro	LINEAR	PHO	3.1 km	MPC · JPL
34459	2000 SC_{91}	—	September 22, 2000	Socorro	LINEAR	EUN	6.8 km	MPC · JPL
34460	2000 SV_{91}	—	September 23, 2000	Socorro	LINEAR	·	10 km	MPC · JPL
34461	2000 SC_{95}	—	September 23, 2000	Socorro	LINEAR	·	6.1 km	MPC · JPL
34462 Stoffregen	2000 SD_{95}	Stoffregen	September 23, 2000	Socorro	LINEAR	·	1.9 km	MPC · JPL
34463	2000 SB_{101}	—	September 23, 2000	Socorro	LINEAR	·	6.9 km	MPC · JPL
34464	2000 SC_{101}	—	September 23, 2000	Socorro	LINEAR	·	5.5 km	MPC · JPL
34465 Swaminathan	2000 SD_{102}	Swaminathan	September 24, 2000	Socorro	LINEAR	·	4.1 km	MPC · JPL
34466 Ognicholls	2000 SN_{105}	Ognicholls	September 24, 2000	Socorro	LINEAR	·	5.7 km	MPC · JPL
34467 Raphotter	2000 SC_{108}	Raphotter	September 24, 2000	Socorro	LINEAR	·	4.4 km	MPC · JPL
34468	2000 SS_{109}	—	September 30, 2000	Socorro	LINEAR	·	5.2 km	MPC · JPL
34469 Danishmahmood	2000 SM_{110}	Danishmahmood	September 24, 2000	Socorro	LINEAR	KOR	3.5 km	MPC · JPL
34470 Chouruihua	2000 SV_{113}	Chouruihua	September 24, 2000	Socorro	LINEAR	·	7.7 km	MPC · JPL
34471 Fanyueyang	2000 SE_{115}	Fanyueyang	September 24, 2000	Socorro	LINEAR	·	6.3 km	MPC · JPL
34472 Guxieran	2000 ST_{115}	Guxieran	September 24, 2000	Socorro	LINEAR	·	3.8 km	MPC · JPL
34473 Linkairui	2000 SC_{116}	Linkairui	September 24, 2000	Socorro	LINEAR	AGN	3.5 km	MPC · JPL
34474 Zhangjingru	2000 SJ_{116}	Zhangjingru	September 24, 2000	Socorro	LINEAR	KOR	3.7 km	MPC · JPL
34475 Zhangyuhui	2000 SC_{118}	Zhangyuhui	September 24, 2000	Socorro	LINEAR	KOR	3.7 km	MPC · JPL
34476	2000 SX_{118}	—	September 24, 2000	Socorro	LINEAR	EOS	10 km	MPC · JPL
34477 Muntz	2000 SJ_{120}	Muntz	September 24, 2000	Socorro	LINEAR	THM	8.3 km	MPC · JPL
34478 Jonasboukamp	2000 SR_{120}	Jonasboukamp	September 24, 2000	Socorro	LINEAR	KOR	3.2 km	MPC · JPL
34479 Dunschen	2000 ST_{120}	Dunschen	September 24, 2000	Socorro	LINEAR	KOR	3.7 km	MPC · JPL
34480	2000 SW_{121}	—	September 24, 2000	Socorro	LINEAR	·	14 km	MPC · JPL
34481	2000 SF_{122}	—	September 24, 2000	Socorro	LINEAR	EOS	6.6 km	MPC · JPL
34482 Jessikirchner	2000 SX_{122}	Jessikirchner	September 24, 2000	Socorro	LINEAR	·	7.5 km	MPC · JPL
34483	2000 SW_{123}	—	September 24, 2000	Socorro	LINEAR	·	6.1 km	MPC · JPL
34484 Kubetzko	2000 SR_{124}	Kubetzko	September 24, 2000	Socorro	LINEAR	NYS	3.7 km	MPC · JPL
34485 Nullmeier	2000 SF_{128}	Nullmeier	September 24, 2000	Socorro	LINEAR	·	4.9 km	MPC · JPL
34486	2000 ST_{131}	—	September 22, 2000	Socorro	LINEAR	·	2.9 km	MPC · JPL
34487	2000 SE_{133}	—	September 23, 2000	Socorro	LINEAR	·	5.1 km	MPC · JPL
34488 Lennartresch	2000 SO_{135}	Lennartresch	September 23, 2000	Socorro	LINEAR	·	4.9 km	MPC · JPL
34489	2000 SE_{136}	—	September 23, 2000	Socorro	LINEAR	EOS	5.6 km	MPC · JPL
34490 Danielkang	2000 SO_{137}	Danielkang	September 23, 2000	Socorro	LINEAR	·	13 km	MPC · JPL
34491 Mohammedsuhail	2000 SB_{138}	Mohammedsuhail	September 23, 2000	Socorro	LINEAR	·	2.4 km	MPC · JPL
34492 Swasthikpadma	2000 SP_{139}	Swasthikpadma	September 23, 2000	Socorro	LINEAR	·	4.7 km	MPC · JPL
34493	2000 SR_{139}	—	September 23, 2000	Socorro	LINEAR	EOS	6.9 km	MPC · JPL
34494 Shikarpur	2000 SE_{144}	Shikarpur	September 24, 2000	Socorro	LINEAR	fast	5.1 km	MPC · JPL
34495	2000 SX_{146}	—	September 24, 2000	Socorro	LINEAR	EOS	6.1 km	MPC · JPL
34496 Viswanath	2000 SF_{147}	Viswanath	September 24, 2000	Socorro	LINEAR	·	5.0 km	MPC · JPL
34497 Fionnferreira	2000 SJ_{147}	Fionnferreira	September 24, 2000	Socorro	LINEAR	·	4.9 km	MPC · JPL
34498 Aaronhannon	2000 SF_{149}	Aaronhannon	September 24, 2000	Socorro	LINEAR	·	7.1 km	MPC · JPL
34499 Yusukesakai	2000 SL_{150}	Yusukesakai	September 24, 2000	Socorro	LINEAR	EMA	11 km	MPC · JPL
34500	2000 SW_{154}	—	September 24, 2000	Socorro	LINEAR	THM	8.1 km	MPC · JPL

== 34501–34600 ==
back to top

Designation			Discovery			Properties		Ref
Permanent	Provisional	Named after	Date	Site	Discoverer(s)	Category	Diam.	Ref
34501	2000 SC_{155}	—	September 24, 2000	Socorro	LINEAR	GEF	5.7 km	MPC · JPL
34502	2000 SE_{157}	—	September 26, 2000	Socorro	LINEAR	MAR	5.7 km	MPC · JPL
34503 Tsuchida	2000 SJ_{157}	Tsuchida	September 26, 2000	Socorro	LINEAR	·	4.9 km	MPC · JPL
34504 Tsuzuku	2000 SJ_{158}	Tsuzuku	September 27, 2000	Socorro	LINEAR	KOR	4.0 km	MPC · JPL
34505	2000 SR_{160}	—	September 27, 2000	Socorro	LINEAR	·	3.1 km	MPC · JPL
34506	2000 SO_{172}	—	September 27, 2000	Socorro	LINEAR	·	4.4 km	MPC · JPL
34507	2000 SE_{174}	—	September 28, 2000	Socorro	LINEAR	·	7.3 km	MPC · JPL
34508	2000 SU_{174}	—	September 28, 2000	Socorro	LINEAR	·	7.0 km	MPC · JPL
34509 Kuwehan	2000 SH_{175}	Kuwehan	September 28, 2000	Socorro	LINEAR	·	2.5 km	MPC · JPL
34510	2000 SJ_{175}	—	September 28, 2000	Socorro	LINEAR	·	7.3 km	MPC · JPL
34511 Aleenasaji	2000 SK_{175}	Aleenasaji	September 28, 2000	Socorro	LINEAR	·	3.3 km	MPC · JPL
34512	2000 SE_{178}	—	September 28, 2000	Socorro	LINEAR	EOS	6.2 km	MPC · JPL
34513	2000 SQ_{178}	—	September 28, 2000	Socorro	LINEAR	CYB	8.0 km	MPC · JPL
34514	2000 SQ_{180}	—	September 28, 2000	Socorro	LINEAR	·	3.6 km	MPC · JPL
34515	2000 SD_{182}	—	September 20, 2000	Socorro	LINEAR	DOR	5.0 km	MPC · JPL
34516	2000 SF_{182}	—	September 20, 2000	Socorro	LINEAR	EOS	4.9 km	MPC · JPL
34517	2000 SC_{185}	—	September 20, 2000	Haleakala	NEAT	EOS	5.8 km	MPC · JPL
34518	2000 SD_{185}	—	September 20, 2000	Haleakala	NEAT	·	5.8 km	MPC · JPL
34519	2000 SJ_{186}	—	September 21, 2000	Kitt Peak	Spacewatch	THM	8.8 km	MPC · JPL
34520	2000 SC_{187}	—	September 21, 2000	Haleakala	NEAT	·	4.8 km	MPC · JPL
34521	2000 SA_{191}	—	September 24, 2000	Socorro	LINEAR	L5	29 km	MPC · JPL
34522 Cadores	2000 SH_{192}	Cadores	September 24, 2000	Socorro	LINEAR	·	4.2 km	MPC · JPL
34523 Manzanero	2000 SU_{194}	Manzanero	September 24, 2000	Socorro	LINEAR	·	7.0 km	MPC · JPL
34524 Eugenerivera	2000 SZ_{195}	Eugenerivera	September 24, 2000	Socorro	LINEAR	·	3.8 km	MPC · JPL
34525 Paszkowski	2000 SQ_{205}	Paszkowski	September 24, 2000	Socorro	LINEAR	·	3.0 km	MPC · JPL
34526	2000 SY_{205}	—	September 24, 2000	Socorro	LINEAR	THM	8.2 km	MPC · JPL
34527 Fransanmartins	2000 SQ_{208}	Fransanmartins	September 25, 2000	Socorro	LINEAR	MAS	2.0 km	MPC · JPL
34528	2000 SW_{211}	—	September 25, 2000	Socorro	LINEAR	EOS	4.8 km	MPC · JPL
34529	2000 SD_{212}	—	September 25, 2000	Socorro	LINEAR	MAR	5.2 km	MPC · JPL
34530	2000 ST_{212}	—	September 25, 2000	Socorro	LINEAR	EOS	6.0 km	MPC · JPL
34531	2000 SY_{212}	—	September 25, 2000	Socorro	LINEAR	TEL · fast	3.7 km	MPC · JPL
34532	2000 SO_{213}	—	September 25, 2000	Socorro	LINEAR	LIX	16 km	MPC · JPL
34533	2000 SS_{213}	—	September 25, 2000	Socorro	LINEAR	EOS	6.2 km	MPC · JPL
34534 Nogueira	2000 SL_{216}	Nogueira	September 26, 2000	Socorro	LINEAR	·	2.1 km	MPC · JPL
34535	2000 SR_{220}	—	September 26, 2000	Socorro	LINEAR	·	3.5 km	MPC · JPL
34536	2000 SJ_{221}	—	September 26, 2000	Socorro	LINEAR	·	7.0 km	MPC · JPL
34537	2000 SW_{221}	—	September 26, 2000	Socorro	LINEAR	·	5.1 km	MPC · JPL
34538	2000 SA_{222}	—	September 26, 2000	Socorro	LINEAR	·	7.4 km	MPC · JPL
34539 Gabrielsilva	2000 SL_{223}	Gabrielsilva	September 27, 2000	Socorro	LINEAR	(12739)	3.8 km	MPC · JPL
34540	2000 SW_{225}	—	September 27, 2000	Socorro	LINEAR	·	13 km	MPC · JPL
34541 Gustavosanreyes	2000 SB_{228}	Gustavosanreyes	September 28, 2000	Socorro	LINEAR	·	4.1 km	MPC · JPL
34542	2000 SC_{228}	—	September 28, 2000	Socorro	LINEAR	·	6.8 km	MPC · JPL
34543 Davidbriggs	2000 SM_{229}	Davidbriggs	September 28, 2000	Socorro	LINEAR	KOR	3.7 km	MPC · JPL
34544 Omarsanreyes	2000 SP_{233}	Omarsanreyes	September 21, 2000	Socorro	LINEAR	·	2.7 km	MPC · JPL
34545 Chirita	2000 SB_{234}	Chirita	September 21, 2000	Socorro	LINEAR	V	3.8 km	MPC · JPL
34546	2000 SG_{234}	—	September 21, 2000	Socorro	LINEAR	·	3.0 km	MPC · JPL
34547	2000 SH_{234}	—	September 21, 2000	Socorro	LINEAR	·	7.9 km	MPC · JPL
34548	2000 SY_{237}	—	September 25, 2000	Socorro	LINEAR	·	5.1 km	MPC · JPL
34549	2000 SA_{238}	—	September 25, 2000	Socorro	LINEAR	EOS	6.3 km	MPC · JPL
34550	2000 SU_{238}	—	September 26, 2000	Socorro	LINEAR	·	11 km	MPC · JPL
34551 Andrianova	2000 SJ_{242}	Andrianova	September 24, 2000	Socorro	LINEAR	·	3.5 km	MPC · JPL
34552 Belousova	2000 SV_{242}	Belousova	September 24, 2000	Socorro	LINEAR	·	8.6 km	MPC · JPL
34553	2000 SV_{246}	—	September 24, 2000	Socorro	LINEAR	L5	23 km	MPC · JPL
34554	2000 ST_{251}	—	September 24, 2000	Socorro	LINEAR	THM	7.8 km	MPC · JPL
34555 Yuliamaslova	2000 SE_{262}	Yuliamaslova	September 25, 2000	Socorro	LINEAR	·	7.1 km	MPC · JPL
34556	2000 SX_{265}	—	September 26, 2000	Socorro	LINEAR	·	8.4 km	MPC · JPL
34557	2000 SE_{270}	—	September 27, 2000	Socorro	LINEAR	EOS	5.2 km	MPC · JPL
34558 Annasavelyeva	2000 SM_{270}	Annasavelyeva	September 27, 2000	Socorro	LINEAR	TEL	3.1 km	MPC · JPL
34559 Aldossary	2000 SN_{272}	Aldossary	September 28, 2000	Socorro	LINEAR	AGN	2.8 km	MPC · JPL
34560	2000 SF_{280}	—	September 28, 2000	Socorro	LINEAR	·	9.0 km	MPC · JPL
34561	2000 SQ_{285}	—	September 23, 2000	Socorro	LINEAR	·	6.4 km	MPC · JPL
34562	2000 SW_{287}	—	September 26, 2000	Socorro	LINEAR	·	15 km	MPC · JPL
34563	2000 SS_{290}	—	September 27, 2000	Socorro	LINEAR	MAR	3.2 km	MPC · JPL
34564	2000 SN_{292}	—	September 27, 2000	Socorro	LINEAR	·	7.1 km	MPC · JPL
34565	2000 SY_{292}	—	September 27, 2000	Socorro	LINEAR	·	5.9 km	MPC · JPL
34566	2000 SE_{294}	—	September 27, 2000	Socorro	LINEAR	·	6.2 km	MPC · JPL
34567 Weidekoo	2000 SR_{297}	Weidekoo	September 28, 2000	Socorro	LINEAR	EOS	5.3 km	MPC · JPL
34568	2000 SP_{305}	—	September 30, 2000	Socorro	LINEAR	EOS	6.4 km	MPC · JPL
34569 Bryanlim	2000 ST_{306}	Bryanlim	September 30, 2000	Socorro	LINEAR	·	5.9 km	MPC · JPL
34570 Shawnlim	2000 SZ_{307}	Shawnlim	September 30, 2000	Socorro	LINEAR	·	6.9 km	MPC · JPL
34571 Dominicyap	2000 SA_{308}	Dominicyap	September 30, 2000	Socorro	LINEAR	·	5.1 km	MPC · JPL
34572	2000 SY_{310}	—	September 26, 2000	Socorro	LINEAR	MAR	7.3 km	MPC · JPL
34573	2000 SG_{316}	—	September 30, 2000	Socorro	LINEAR	URS	9.0 km	MPC · JPL
34574	2000 SW_{319}	—	September 27, 2000	Socorro	LINEAR	EOS	5.8 km	MPC · JPL
34575	2000 SH_{327}	—	September 29, 2000	Haleakala	NEAT	·	9.7 km	MPC · JPL
34576 Leeshangjung	2000 SA_{329}	Leeshangjung	September 27, 2000	Socorro	LINEAR	·	6.4 km	MPC · JPL
34577	2000 SP_{336}	—	September 26, 2000	Haleakala	NEAT	·	3.0 km	MPC · JPL
34578	2000 SL_{338}	—	September 25, 2000	Haleakala	NEAT	·	8.8 km	MPC · JPL
34579	2000 SR_{339}	—	September 25, 2000	Kitt Peak	Spacewatch	BRA	3.9 km	MPC · JPL
34580 Yenpohsun	2000 SA_{343}	Yenpohsun	September 24, 2000	Socorro	LINEAR	KOR	3.6 km	MPC · JPL
34581	2000 SC_{348}	—	September 20, 2000	Socorro	LINEAR	CYB	11 km	MPC · JPL
34582	2000 SH_{348}	—	September 20, 2000	Socorro	LINEAR	EUN	3.6 km	MPC · JPL
34583 Dmitriivavilov	2000 SN_{351}	Dmitriivavilov	September 29, 2000	Anderson Mesa	LONEOS	·	5.8 km	MPC · JPL
34584 Martintowner	2000 SX_{351}	Martintowner	September 29, 2000	Anderson Mesa	LONEOS	EUN	4.2 km	MPC · JPL
34585 Torrano	2000 SJ_{352}	Torrano	September 30, 2000	Anderson Mesa	LONEOS	V	2.4 km	MPC · JPL
34586 Filipemonteiro	2000 SK_{352}	Filipemonteiro	September 30, 2000	Anderson Mesa	LONEOS	EOS	5.5 km	MPC · JPL
34587 Vieiraneto	2000 SA_{357}	Vieiraneto	September 28, 2000	Anderson Mesa	LONEOS	·	5.7 km	MPC · JPL
34588	2000 TL	—	October 2, 2000	Fountain Hills	C. W. Juels	EUN	4.7 km	MPC · JPL
34589 Sarahadamo	2000 TO_{2}	Sarahadamo	October 1, 2000	Socorro	LINEAR	·	4.1 km	MPC · JPL
34590	2000 TS_{2}	—	October 1, 2000	Socorro	LINEAR	·	4.7 km	MPC · JPL
34591 Saadhahmed	2000 TB_{15}	Saadhahmed	October 1, 2000	Socorro	LINEAR	THM	8.2 km	MPC · JPL
34592 Amirtharaj	2000 TM_{17}	Amirtharaj	October 1, 2000	Socorro	LINEAR	·	5.1 km	MPC · JPL
34593	2000 TD_{19}	—	October 1, 2000	Socorro	LINEAR	EOS	6.5 km	MPC · JPL
34594 Rohanarora	2000 TP_{24}	Rohanarora	October 2, 2000	Socorro	LINEAR	·	4.5 km	MPC · JPL
34595	2000 TR_{29}	—	October 4, 2000	Socorro	LINEAR	·	3.8 km	MPC · JPL
34596	2000 TB_{34}	—	October 4, 2000	Bergisch Gladbach	W. Bickel	ADE	7.7 km	MPC · JPL
34597 Sondy	2000 TO_{36}	Sondy	October 6, 2000	Anderson Mesa	LONEOS	·	5.4 km	MPC · JPL
34598	2000 TC_{38}	—	October 1, 2000	Socorro	LINEAR	·	7.2 km	MPC · JPL
34599 Burzinbalsara	2000 TV_{39}	Burzinbalsara	October 1, 2000	Socorro	LINEAR	·	5.0 km	MPC · JPL
34600	2000 TY_{39}	—	October 1, 2000	Socorro	LINEAR	·	6.9 km	MPC · JPL

== 34601–34700 ==
back to top

Designation			Discovery			Properties		Ref
Permanent	Provisional	Named after	Date	Site	Discoverer(s)	Category	Diam.	Ref
34601	2000 TR_{51}	—	October 1, 2000	Socorro	LINEAR	·	5.4 km	MPC · JPL
34602	2000 TO_{57}	—	October 2, 2000	Anderson Mesa	LONEOS	EOS	7.5 km	MPC · JPL
34603	2000 TS_{60}	—	October 2, 2000	Anderson Mesa	LONEOS	·	11 km	MPC · JPL
34604 Vilhena	2000 TW_{60}	Vilhena	October 2, 2000	Anderson Mesa	LONEOS	·	4.3 km	MPC · JPL
34605	2000 US	—	October 21, 2000	Višnjan Observatory	K. Korlević	·	5.5 km	MPC · JPL
34606	2000 UT	—	October 21, 2000	Višnjan Observatory	K. Korlević	·	3.2 km	MPC · JPL
34607	2000 UD_{3}	—	October 24, 2000	Črni Vrh	Črni Vrh	EOS	5.3 km	MPC · JPL
34608	2000 UW_{7}	—	October 24, 2000	Socorro	LINEAR	EOS	5.8 km	MPC · JPL
34609	2000 UK_{8}	—	October 24, 2000	Socorro	LINEAR	EOS	7.2 km	MPC · JPL
34610	2000 UV_{9}	—	October 24, 2000	Socorro	LINEAR	EOS	7.9 km	MPC · JPL
34611 Nacogdoches	2000 UF_{11}	Nacogdoches	October 25, 2000	Nacogdoches	Bruton, W. D., Williams, R. M.	THM	8.2 km	MPC · JPL
34612	2000 UN_{13}	—	October 23, 2000	Višnjan Observatory	K. Korlević	·	8.7 km	MPC · JPL
34613	2000 UR_{13}	—	October 27, 2000	Kitt Peak	Spacewatch	AMO +1km	2.2 km	MPC · JPL
34614	2000 UF_{19}	—	October 29, 2000	Socorro	LINEAR	·	5.7 km	MPC · JPL
34615	2000 UQ_{27}	—	October 24, 2000	Socorro	LINEAR	GEF	5.9 km	MPC · JPL
34616 Andrewbennett	2000 UO_{38}	Andrewbennett	October 24, 2000	Socorro	LINEAR	·	5.7 km	MPC · JPL
34617	2000 UU_{48}	—	October 24, 2000	Socorro	LINEAR	·	6.1 km	MPC · JPL
34618	2000 UX_{49}	—	October 24, 2000	Socorro	LINEAR	·	9.6 km	MPC · JPL
34619 Swagat	2000 UX_{53}	Swagat	October 24, 2000	Socorro	LINEAR	TEL	5.5 km	MPC · JPL
34620 Edwinbodoni	2000 UX_{54}	Edwinbodoni	October 24, 2000	Socorro	LINEAR	MRX	3.9 km	MPC · JPL
34621	2000 UR_{55}	—	October 24, 2000	Socorro	LINEAR	TEL	4.8 km	MPC · JPL
34622	2000 UK_{58}	—	October 25, 2000	Socorro	LINEAR	TEL	4.3 km	MPC · JPL
34623	2000 US_{59}	—	October 25, 2000	Socorro	LINEAR	EOS	6.7 km	MPC · JPL
34624	2000 UB_{62}	—	October 25, 2000	Socorro	LINEAR	EOS	5.6 km	MPC · JPL
34625 Bollimpalli	2000 UT_{68}	Bollimpalli	October 25, 2000	Socorro	LINEAR	·	5.0 km	MPC · JPL
34626	2000 UN_{69}	—	October 25, 2000	Socorro	LINEAR	EOS	5.6 km	MPC · JPL
34627	2000 UW_{95}	—	October 25, 2000	Socorro	LINEAR	(1298)	9.3 km	MPC · JPL
34628 Samaboyea	2000 UA_{99}	Samaboyea	October 25, 2000	Socorro	LINEAR	EOS	5.9 km	MPC · JPL
34629	2000 UK_{107}	—	October 30, 2000	Socorro	LINEAR	EOS	4.5 km	MPC · JPL
34630	2000 UX_{107}	—	October 30, 2000	Socorro	LINEAR	·	7.1 km	MPC · JPL
34631	2000 UY_{107}	—	October 30, 2000	Socorro	LINEAR	·	15 km	MPC · JPL
34632 Sarahbroas	2000 UY_{109}	Sarahbroas	October 31, 2000	Socorro	LINEAR	GEF	4.2 km	MPC · JPL
34633 Megancantwell	2000 VN_{11}	Megancantwell	November 1, 2000	Socorro	LINEAR	·	8.8 km	MPC · JPL
34634 Anjalichadha	2000 VQ_{17}	Anjalichadha	November 1, 2000	Socorro	LINEAR	slow	5.6 km	MPC · JPL
34635	2000 VH_{29}	—	November 1, 2000	Socorro	LINEAR	HYG	12 km	MPC · JPL
34636 Lauwingkai	2000 VC_{39}	Lauwingkai	November 1, 2000	Desert Beaver	W. K. Y. Yeung	·	9.9 km	MPC · JPL
34637	2000 VR_{41}	—	November 1, 2000	Socorro	LINEAR	·	8.7 km	MPC · JPL
34638	2000 VV_{54}	—	November 3, 2000	Socorro	LINEAR	·	11 km	MPC · JPL
34639	2000 WG_{1}	—	November 17, 2000	Socorro	LINEAR	·	4.8 km	MPC · JPL
34640	2000 WN_{1}	—	November 17, 2000	Socorro	LINEAR	MAR	3.7 km	MPC · JPL
34641	2000 WL_{2}	—	November 17, 2000	Socorro	LINEAR	EOS	4.3 km	MPC · JPL
34642	2000 WN_{2}	—	November 18, 2000	Socorro	LINEAR	L5	33 km	MPC · JPL
34643	2000 WQ_{3}	—	November 18, 2000	Socorro	LINEAR	PHO	3.6 km	MPC · JPL
34644 Yatinchandar	2000 WX_{13}	Yatinchandar	November 20, 2000	Socorro	LINEAR	·	5.1 km	MPC · JPL
34645 Vieiramartins	2000 WT_{67}	Vieiramartins	November 20, 2000	Anderson Mesa	LONEOS	EOS ·	5.6 km	MPC · JPL
34646 Niaclements	2000 WT_{95}	Niaclements	November 21, 2000	Socorro	LINEAR	AST	6.6 km	MPC · JPL
34647 Ankushdhawan	2000 WV_{97}	Ankushdhawan	November 21, 2000	Socorro	LINEAR	·	4.8 km	MPC · JPL
34648	2000 WZ_{101}	—	November 26, 2000	Socorro	LINEAR	·	3.7 km	MPC · JPL
34649	2000 WB_{103}	—	November 26, 2000	Socorro	LINEAR	CYB	10 km	MPC · JPL
34650 Dunkenberger	2000 WK_{108}	Dunkenberger	November 20, 2000	Socorro	LINEAR	V	1.8 km	MPC · JPL
34651 Edamadaka	2000 WQ_{114}	Edamadaka	November 20, 2000	Socorro	LINEAR	·	3.9 km	MPC · JPL
34652 Simoneevans	2000 WN_{136}	Simoneevans	November 20, 2000	Socorro	LINEAR	·	2.6 km	MPC · JPL
34653	2000 WJ_{144}	—	November 21, 2000	Haleakala	NEAT	EUN	5.1 km	MPC · JPL
34654	2000 WF_{145}	—	November 22, 2000	Haleakala	NEAT	·	6.0 km	MPC · JPL
34655	2000 WS_{151}	—	November 29, 2000	Haleakala	NEAT	·	5.9 km	MPC · JPL
34656	2000 WL_{152}	—	November 28, 2000	Socorro	LINEAR	EUN	4.1 km	MPC · JPL
34657	2000 WG_{154}	—	November 30, 2000	Socorro	LINEAR	EOS	6.0 km	MPC · JPL
34658	2000 WS_{158}	—	November 30, 2000	Haleakala	NEAT	·	7.1 km	MPC · JPL
34659 Damyasouami	2000 WS_{159}	Damyasouami	November 20, 2000	Anderson Mesa	LONEOS	THM	7.5 km	MPC · JPL
34660 Mickeyvillarreal	2000 WB_{162}	Mickeyvillarreal	November 20, 2000	Anderson Mesa	LONEOS	·	6.1 km	MPC · JPL
34661	2000 WQ_{165}	—	November 23, 2000	Haleakala	NEAT	EOS	6.0 km	MPC · JPL
34662	2000 WA_{172}	—	November 25, 2000	Socorro	LINEAR	·	2.4 km	MPC · JPL
34663	2000 WT_{173}	—	November 26, 2000	Socorro	LINEAR	·	8.0 km	MPC · JPL
34664	2000 WW_{182}	—	November 18, 2000	Socorro	LINEAR	MAR	4.3 km	MPC · JPL
34665 Akbarwhizin	2000 WW_{184}	Akbarwhizin	November 29, 2000	Anderson Mesa	LONEOS	·	4.0 km	MPC · JPL
34666 Bohyunsan	2000 XA_{14}	Bohyunsan	December 4, 2000	Bohyunsan	Jeon, Y.-B., Lee, B.-C.	·	6.3 km	MPC · JPL
34667	2000 XJ_{19}	—	December 4, 2000	Socorro	LINEAR	·	11 km	MPC · JPL
34668	2000 XW_{39}	—	December 5, 2000	Socorro	LINEAR	·	19 km	MPC · JPL
34669	2000 YO_{5}	—	December 16, 2000	Socorro	LINEAR	·	16 km	MPC · JPL
34670	2000 YL_{11}	—	December 19, 2000	Haleakala	NEAT	·	10 km	MPC · JPL
34671	2000 YY_{18}	—	December 21, 2000	Socorro	LINEAR	·	3.6 km	MPC · JPL
34672	2000 YU_{53}	—	December 30, 2000	Socorro	LINEAR	EOS	7.1 km	MPC · JPL
34673	2000 YM_{70}	—	December 30, 2000	Socorro	LINEAR	EOS	7.1 km	MPC · JPL
34674	2000 YE_{78}	—	December 30, 2000	Socorro	LINEAR	·	16 km	MPC · JPL
34675 Feldbush	2000 YR_{115}	Feldbush	December 30, 2000	Socorro	LINEAR	NYS	3.6 km	MPC · JPL
34676	2000 YF_{126}	—	December 29, 2000	Haleakala	NEAT	·	9.3 km	MPC · JPL
34677 Hunterwilliams	2000 YB_{135}	Hunterwilliams	December 17, 2000	Anderson Mesa	LONEOS	·	5.8 km	MPC · JPL
34678 Hansenestruch	2001 AB_{29}	Hansenestruch	January 4, 2001	Socorro	LINEAR	·	4.3 km	MPC · JPL
34679	2001 BH_{17}	—	January 19, 2001	Socorro	LINEAR	·	3.8 km	MPC · JPL
34680 Anahumphrey	2001 BR_{21}	Anahumphrey	January 20, 2001	Socorro	LINEAR	AGN	5.8 km	MPC · JPL
34681 Suhahussain	2001 BB_{22}	Suhahussain	January 20, 2001	Socorro	LINEAR	·	2.5 km	MPC · JPL
34682	2001 BM_{42}	—	January 19, 2001	Socorro	LINEAR	·	4.3 km	MPC · JPL
34683	2001 CM_{11}	—	February 1, 2001	Socorro	LINEAR	EUN	4.0 km	MPC · JPL
34684	2001 CJ_{28}	—	February 2, 2001	Anderson Mesa	LONEOS	L4	20 km	MPC · JPL
34685	2001 EE_{12}	—	March 3, 2001	Socorro	LINEAR	EUN	2.8 km	MPC · JPL
34686	2001 FA_{40}	—	March 18, 2001	Socorro	LINEAR	·	3.4 km	MPC · JPL
34687 Isahaku	2001 FU_{74}	Isahaku	March 19, 2001	Socorro	LINEAR	·	3.5 km	MPC · JPL
34688	2001 FG_{119}	—	March 20, 2001	Haleakala	NEAT	·	6.5 km	MPC · JPL
34689 Flewelling	2001 FY_{147}	Flewelling	March 24, 2001	Anderson Mesa	LONEOS	·	7.3 km	MPC · JPL
34690	2001 FH_{161}	—	March 29, 2001	Haleakala	NEAT	·	5.2 km	MPC · JPL
34691	2001 KV_{58}	—	May 26, 2001	Socorro	LINEAR	·	12 km	MPC · JPL
34692	2001 KE_{61}	—	May 17, 2001	Haleakala	NEAT	·	3.5 km	MPC · JPL
34693	2001 LW_{14}	—	June 15, 2001	Socorro	LINEAR	·	2.3 km	MPC · JPL
34694	2001 MK_{18}	—	June 23, 2001	Palomar	NEAT	·	2.2 km	MPC · JPL
34695	2001 NY_{21}	—	July 14, 2001	Palomar	NEAT	NYS	4.8 km	MPC · JPL
34696 Risoldi	2001 OV_{12}	Risoldi	July 21, 2001	San Marcello	A. Boattini, M. Tombelli	·	4.5 km	MPC · JPL
34697	2001 OS_{14}	—	July 20, 2001	Socorro	LINEAR	·	5.1 km	MPC · JPL
34698	2001 OD_{22}	—	July 21, 2001	Anderson Mesa	LONEOS	slow ·	8.3 km	MPC · JPL
34699	2001 OQ_{25}	—	July 18, 2001	Haleakala	NEAT	EOS	4.2 km	MPC · JPL
34700	2001 OE_{45}	—	July 16, 2001	Anderson Mesa	LONEOS	·	9.7 km	MPC · JPL

== 34701–34800 ==
back to top

Designation			Discovery			Properties		Ref
Permanent	Provisional	Named after	Date	Site	Discoverer(s)	Category	Diam.	Ref
34701	2001 OZ_{57}	—	July 19, 2001	Palomar	NEAT	·	4.9 km	MPC · JPL
34702	2001 OW_{62}	—	July 20, 2001	Anderson Mesa	LONEOS	V	3.4 km	MPC · JPL
34703 Wozniakiewicz	2001 OZ_{67}	Wozniakiewicz	July 16, 2001	Anderson Mesa	LONEOS	NYS ·	4.0 km	MPC · JPL
34704	2001 OS_{80}	—	July 29, 2001	Socorro	LINEAR	EUN	7.9 km	MPC · JPL
34705	2001 OA_{81}	—	July 29, 2001	Socorro	LINEAR	EUN	5.4 km	MPC · JPL
34706	2001 OP_{83}	—	July 27, 2001	Palomar	NEAT	moon	3.0 km	MPC · JPL
34707	2001 OU_{86}	—	July 28, 2001	Haleakala	NEAT	·	4.3 km	MPC · JPL
34708 Grasset	2001 OG_{95}	Grasset	July 29, 2001	Palomar	NEAT	PHO	4.7 km	MPC · JPL
34709	2001 OW_{96}	—	July 25, 2001	Haleakala	NEAT	·	7.1 km	MPC · JPL
34710	2001 OS_{97}	—	July 25, 2001	Haleakala	NEAT	EOS	6.6 km	MPC · JPL
34711	2001 OV_{97}	—	July 25, 2001	Haleakala	NEAT	EOS	9.8 km	MPC · JPL
34712 Zexixing	2001 ON_{103}	Zexixing	July 29, 2001	Anderson Mesa	LONEOS	·	11 km	MPC · JPL
34713 Yeşiltaş	2001 OO_{103}	Yeşiltaş	July 29, 2001	Anderson Mesa	LONEOS	GEF ·	9.6 km	MPC · JPL
34714 Haozhang	2001 OB_{105}	Haozhang	July 28, 2001	Anderson Mesa	LONEOS	·	4.8 km	MPC · JPL
34715	2001 PO_{12}	—	August 12, 2001	Palomar	NEAT	·	6.4 km	MPC · JPL
34716 Guzzo	2001 PC_{14}	Guzzo	August 14, 2001	San Marcello	A. Boattini, L. Tesi	·	2.6 km	MPC · JPL
34717 Mirkovilli	2001 PD_{14}	Mirkovilli	August 14, 2001	San Marcello	A. Boattini, L. Tesi	·	2.6 km	MPC · JPL
34718 Cantagalli	2001 PR_{28}	Cantagalli	August 14, 2001	San Marcello	L. Tesi, A. Boattini	·	7.9 km	MPC · JPL
34719	2001 PW_{47}	—	August 13, 2001	Haleakala	NEAT	URS	12 km	MPC · JPL
34720	2001 PH_{54}	—	August 14, 2001	Haleakala	NEAT	KOR	3.0 km	MPC · JPL
34721	2001 QH_{5}	—	August 16, 2001	Socorro	LINEAR	·	8.7 km	MPC · JPL
34722	2001 QF_{9}	—	August 16, 2001	Socorro	LINEAR	NYS	2.0 km	MPC · JPL
34723	2001 QV_{14}	—	August 16, 2001	Socorro	LINEAR	·	9.9 km	MPC · JPL
34724	2001 QM_{18}	—	August 16, 2001	Socorro	LINEAR	·	1.5 km	MPC · JPL
34725	2001 QJ_{19}	—	August 16, 2001	Socorro	LINEAR	MRX	4.1 km	MPC · JPL
34726	2001 QA_{25}	—	August 16, 2001	Socorro	LINEAR	·	18 km	MPC · JPL
34727	2001 QV_{28}	—	August 16, 2001	Socorro	LINEAR	THM	8.7 km	MPC · JPL
34728	2001 QM_{30}	—	August 16, 2001	Socorro	LINEAR	PAD	9.7 km	MPC · JPL
34729 Natalianoel	2001 QJ_{42}	Natalianoel	August 16, 2001	Socorro	LINEAR	KOR	3.7 km	MPC · JPL
34730 Rainajain	2001 QO_{45}	Rainajain	August 16, 2001	Socorro	LINEAR	THM	3.9 km	MPC · JPL
34731 Ronitjain	2001 QU_{47}	Ronitjain	August 16, 2001	Socorro	LINEAR	·	4.5 km	MPC · JPL
34732	2001 QD_{48}	—	August 16, 2001	Socorro	LINEAR	·	2.8 km	MPC · JPL
34733	2001 QY_{52}	—	August 16, 2001	Socorro	LINEAR	NYS	1.8 km	MPC · JPL
34734	2001 QS_{64}	—	August 16, 2001	Socorro	LINEAR	·	5.9 km	MPC · JPL
34735	2001 QA_{69}	—	August 17, 2001	Socorro	LINEAR	·	8.7 km	MPC · JPL
34736	2001 QG_{69}	—	August 17, 2001	Socorro	LINEAR	·	5.5 km	MPC · JPL
34737 Parkerjou	2001 QC_{71}	Parkerjou	August 18, 2001	Socorro	LINEAR	·	2.4 km	MPC · JPL
34738 Hulbert	2001 QV_{71}	Hulbert	August 20, 2001	Terre Haute	Wolfe, C.	·	2.0 km	MPC · JPL
34739 Maryalice	2001 QO_{75}	Maryalice	August 16, 2001	Socorro	LINEAR	THM	6.9 km	MPC · JPL
34740 Emmakeeler	2001 QJ_{77}	Emmakeeler	August 16, 2001	Socorro	LINEAR	·	5.4 km	MPC · JPL
34741 Alyssakeirn	2001 QM_{77}	Alyssakeirn	August 16, 2001	Socorro	LINEAR	NYS	4.6 km	MPC · JPL
34742	2001 QD_{79}	—	August 16, 2001	Socorro	LINEAR	ADE	7.2 km	MPC · JPL
34743 Kollipara	2001 QE_{80}	Kollipara	August 16, 2001	Socorro	LINEAR	·	6.0 km	MPC · JPL
34744	2001 QS_{86}	—	August 16, 2001	Palomar	NEAT	MAR	4.8 km	MPC · JPL
34745	2001 QV_{90}	—	August 22, 2001	Socorro	LINEAR	H	1.5 km	MPC · JPL
34746 Thoon	2001 QE_{91}	Thoon	August 22, 2001	Socorro	LINEAR	L5	62 km	MPC · JPL
34747	2001 QC_{92}	—	August 19, 2001	Socorro	LINEAR	·	13 km	MPC · JPL
34748	2001 QN_{93}	—	August 22, 2001	Socorro	LINEAR	·	12 km	MPC · JPL
34749	2001 QU_{93}	—	August 22, 2001	Socorro	LINEAR	HYG ·	7.5 km	MPC · JPL
34750	2001 QB_{97}	—	August 17, 2001	Socorro	LINEAR	CYB	11 km	MPC · JPL
34751	2001 QO_{100}	—	August 22, 2001	Haleakala	NEAT	PHO	4.1 km	MPC · JPL
34752 Venkatkrishnan	2001 QU_{105}	Venkatkrishnan	August 23, 2001	Socorro	LINEAR	·	3.3 km	MPC · JPL
34753 Zdeněkmatyáš	2001 QU_{110}	Zdeněkmatyáš	August 24, 2001	Ondřejov	P. Pravec, P. Kušnirák	·	1.4 km	MPC · JPL
34754	2001 QG_{111}	—	August 25, 2001	Fountain Hills	C. W. Juels	·	5.0 km	MPC · JPL
34755	2001 QW_{120}	—	August 19, 2001	Socorro	LINEAR	·	4.5 km	MPC · JPL
34756	2001 QL_{139}	—	August 22, 2001	Socorro	LINEAR	·	4.1 km	MPC · JPL
34757	2001 QX_{139}	—	August 22, 2001	Socorro	LINEAR	ADE	8.1 km	MPC · JPL
34758	2001 QH_{148}	—	August 20, 2001	Palomar	NEAT	·	6.9 km	MPC · JPL
34759	2001 QL_{151}	—	August 23, 2001	Socorro	LINEAR	·	7.5 km	MPC · JPL
34760 Ciccone	2001 QR_{152}	Ciccone	August 26, 2001	Desert Eagle	W. K. Y. Yeung	·	5.7 km	MPC · JPL
34761	2001 QM_{179}	—	August 28, 2001	Palomar	NEAT	(2076)	2.3 km	MPC · JPL
34762	2001 QP_{180}	—	August 25, 2001	Palomar	NEAT	NYS	2.3 km	MPC · JPL
34763	2001 QV_{189}	—	August 22, 2001	Socorro	LINEAR	·	4.5 km	MPC · JPL
34764	2001 QZ_{197}	—	August 22, 2001	Socorro	LINEAR	·	6.3 km	MPC · JPL
34765	2001 QG_{199}	—	August 22, 2001	Socorro	LINEAR	PAD ·	7.6 km	MPC · JPL
34766 Everettkroll	2001 QP_{200}	Everettkroll	August 22, 2001	Socorro	LINEAR	·	2.5 km	MPC · JPL
34767	2001 QV_{201}	—	August 22, 2001	Palomar	NEAT	GEF	6.4 km	MPC · JPL
34768	2001 QK_{221}	—	August 24, 2001	Palomar	NEAT	·	2.6 km	MPC · JPL
34769 Remilabeille	2001 QB_{236}	Remilabeille	August 24, 2001	Socorro	LINEAR	NYS	2.2 km	MPC · JPL
34770 Leyendecker	2001 QJ_{243}	Leyendecker	August 24, 2001	Socorro	LINEAR	·	4.0 km	MPC · JPL
34771 Lilauren	2001 QO_{252}	Lilauren	August 25, 2001	Socorro	LINEAR	NYS	3.3 km	MPC · JPL
34772 Lirachel	2001 QU_{257}	Lirachel	August 25, 2001	Socorro	LINEAR	·	3.0 km	MPC · JPL
34773	2001 QL_{260}	—	August 25, 2001	Socorro	LINEAR	·	7.9 km	MPC · JPL
34774	2001 QX_{261}	—	August 25, 2001	Socorro	LINEAR	·	13 km	MPC · JPL
34775 Zinzi	2001 QL_{263}	Zinzi	August 25, 2001	Anderson Mesa	LONEOS	·	8.4 km	MPC · JPL
34776	2001 QC_{269}	—	August 20, 2001	Palomar	NEAT	·	3.8 km	MPC · JPL
34777	2001 RH	—	September 6, 2001	Socorro	LINEAR	T_{j} (2.94)	16 km	MPC · JPL
34778 Huhunglick	2001 RV_{6}	Huhunglick	September 10, 2001	Desert Eagle	W. K. Y. Yeung	·	4.6 km	MPC · JPL
34779 Chungchiyung	2001 RW_{11}	Chungchiyung	September 10, 2001	Desert Eagle	W. K. Y. Yeung	·	3.5 km	MPC · JPL
34780 Nikhillohe	2001 RB_{56}	Nikhillohe	September 12, 2001	Socorro	LINEAR	·	2.0 km	MPC · JPL
34781	2001 RK_{63}	—	September 12, 2001	Socorro	LINEAR	·	12 km	MPC · JPL
34782	2001 RV_{72}	—	September 10, 2001	Socorro	LINEAR	·	5.7 km	MPC · JPL
34783	2001 RB_{75}	—	September 10, 2001	Socorro	LINEAR	THM	7.9 km	MPC · JPL
34784 Lukelong	2001 RS_{77}	Lukelong	September 10, 2001	Socorro	LINEAR	·	2.6 km	MPC · JPL
34785	2001 RG_{87}	—	September 11, 2001	Anderson Mesa	LONEOS	L5	29 km	MPC · JPL
34786 Odeh	2001 RS_{87}	Odeh	September 11, 2001	Anderson Mesa	LONEOS	KOR	4.3 km	MPC · JPL
34787	2001 RG_{109}	—	September 12, 2001	Socorro	LINEAR	NYS	1.6 km	MPC · JPL
34788 Samuellossef	2001 RE_{114}	Samuellossef	September 12, 2001	Socorro	LINEAR	·	1.9 km	MPC · JPL
34789 Brucemckean	2001 SC_{2}	Brucemckean	September 17, 2001	Desert Eagle	W. K. Y. Yeung	·	2.7 km	MPC · JPL
34790	2001 SA_{4}	—	September 16, 2001	Palomar	NEAT	EOS	6.5 km	MPC · JPL
34791 Ericcraine	2001 SU_{4}	Ericcraine	September 18, 2001	Goodricke-Pigott	R. A. Tucker	(5)	3.6 km	MPC · JPL
34792 Hsiehcheching	2001 SE_{10}	Hsiehcheching	September 20, 2001	Desert Eagle	W. K. Y. Yeung	·	3.4 km	MPC · JPL
34793	2001 SO_{12}	—	September 16, 2001	Socorro	LINEAR	·	10 km	MPC · JPL
34794	2001 SS_{25}	—	September 16, 2001	Socorro	LINEAR	·	7.7 km	MPC · JPL
34795	2001 SB_{34}	—	September 16, 2001	Socorro	LINEAR	THM	8.6 km	MPC · JPL
34796 Rheamalhotra	2001 SW_{35}	Rheamalhotra	September 16, 2001	Socorro	LINEAR	·	5.7 km	MPC · JPL
34797 Alicemartynova	2001 SK_{38}	Alicemartynova	September 16, 2001	Socorro	LINEAR	·	4.2 km	MPC · JPL
34798	2001 SD_{45}	—	September 16, 2001	Socorro	LINEAR	·	1.6 km	MPC · JPL
34799 Mcdonaldboyer	2001 SQ_{48}	Mcdonaldboyer	September 16, 2001	Socorro	LINEAR	·	2.2 km	MPC · JPL
34800 Evanmeade	2001 SD_{59}	Evanmeade	September 17, 2001	Socorro	LINEAR	·	4.1 km	MPC · JPL

== 34801–34900 ==
back to top

Designation			Discovery			Properties		Ref
Permanent	Provisional	Named after	Date	Site	Discoverer(s)	Category	Diam.	Ref
34801	2001 SE_{61}	—	September 17, 2001	Socorro	LINEAR	·	9.0 km	MPC · JPL
34802 Anwesha	2001 SP_{61}	Anwesha	September 17, 2001	Socorro	LINEAR	·	2.7 km	MPC · JPL
34803	2001 SW_{63}	—	September 17, 2001	Socorro	LINEAR	(3460)	11 km	MPC · JPL
34804	2001 SP_{67}	—	September 17, 2001	Socorro	LINEAR	PHO · slow	5.2 km	MPC · JPL
34805	2001 SC_{69}	—	September 17, 2001	Socorro	LINEAR	·	6.1 km	MPC · JPL
34806	2001 SJ_{69}	—	September 17, 2001	Socorro	LINEAR	·	2.5 km	MPC · JPL
34807	2001 SQ_{72}	—	September 17, 2001	Socorro	LINEAR	PHO · slow	3.3 km	MPC · JPL
34808 Bocosur	2001 SY_{73}	Bocosur	September 19, 2001	Anderson Mesa	LONEOS	EOS	5.9 km	MPC · JPL
34809	2001 SQ_{74}	—	September 19, 2001	Anderson Mesa	LONEOS	EOS	6.1 km	MPC · JPL
34810	2001 SN_{108}	—	September 20, 2001	Socorro	LINEAR	EOS	4.8 km	MPC · JPL
34811	2001 ST_{108}	—	September 20, 2001	Socorro	LINEAR	EUN	4.2 km	MPC · JPL
34812	2001 SB_{109}	—	September 20, 2001	Socorro	LINEAR	EUN	6.6 km	MPC · JPL
34813	2001 SS_{109}	—	September 20, 2001	Socorro	LINEAR	EUN	5.7 km	MPC · JPL
34814 Muthukumar	2001 ST_{109}	Muthukumar	September 20, 2001	Socorro	LINEAR	·	8.6 km	MPC · JPL
34815 Wongfaye	2001 SQ_{113}	Wongfaye	September 20, 2001	Desert Eagle	W. K. Y. Yeung	·	3.8 km	MPC · JPL
34816 Billybarr	2001 ST_{113}	Billybarr	September 20, 2001	Desert Eagle	W. K. Y. Yeung	·	2.8 km	MPC · JPL
34817 Shiominemoto	2001 SE_{116}	Shiominemoto	September 21, 2001	Bisei SG Center	BATTeRS	H	3.4 km	MPC · JPL
34818	2001 SQ_{116}	—	September 16, 2001	Socorro	LINEAR	HYG	8.0 km	MPC · JPL
34819 Nandininaidu	2001 SW_{119}	Nandininaidu	September 16, 2001	Socorro	LINEAR	·	2.8 km	MPC · JPL
34820	2001 SC_{125}	—	September 16, 2001	Socorro	LINEAR	·	1.5 km	MPC · JPL
34821 Oyetunji	2001 SF_{129}	Oyetunji	September 16, 2001	Socorro	LINEAR	DOR	7.1 km	MPC · JPL
34822 Dhruvikparikh	2001 SO_{133}	Dhruvikparikh	September 16, 2001	Socorro	LINEAR	·	4.6 km	MPC · JPL
34823 Lillipetersen	2001 SM_{155}	Lillipetersen	September 17, 2001	Socorro	LINEAR	·	4.4 km	MPC · JPL
34824	2001 SY_{156}	—	September 17, 2001	Socorro	LINEAR	·	9.5 km	MPC · JPL
34825	2001 SR_{161}	—	September 17, 2001	Socorro	LINEAR	·	10 km	MPC · JPL
34826	2001 SK_{163}	—	September 17, 2001	Socorro	LINEAR	·	2.2 km	MPC · JPL
34827	2001 SC_{165}	—	September 17, 2001	Socorro	LINEAR	KOR	5.4 km	MPC · JPL
34828 Ishapuri	2001 SO_{168}	Ishapuri	September 19, 2001	Socorro	LINEAR	HYG	8.3 km	MPC · JPL
34829	2001 SF_{198}	—	September 19, 2001	Socorro	LINEAR	·	1.7 km	MPC · JPL
34830 Annaquinlan	2001 SQ_{227}	Annaquinlan	September 19, 2001	Socorro	LINEAR	·	5.4 km	MPC · JPL
34831 Krithikramesh	2001 SA_{234}	Krithikramesh	September 19, 2001	Socorro	LINEAR	·	2.5 km	MPC · JPL
34832	2001 SU_{234}	—	September 19, 2001	Socorro	LINEAR	·	1.6 km	MPC · JPL
34833	2001 SF_{239}	—	September 19, 2001	Socorro	LINEAR	·	2.0 km	MPC · JPL
34834	2001 SF_{243}	—	September 19, 2001	Socorro	LINEAR	CYB	10 km	MPC · JPL
34835	2001 SZ_{249}	—	September 19, 2001	Socorro	LINEAR	L5	16 km	MPC · JPL
34836 Ronakroy	2001 SE_{254}	Ronakroy	September 19, 2001	Socorro	LINEAR	·	4.0 km	MPC · JPL
34837 Berilsaygin	2001 SD_{262}	Berilsaygin	September 21, 2001	Socorro	LINEAR	·	2.9 km	MPC · JPL
34838 Lazowski	2001 SK_{262}	Lazowski	September 21, 2001	Desert Eagle	W. K. Y. Yeung	VER	9.6 km	MPC · JPL
34839	2001 SL_{263}	—	September 25, 2001	Fountain Hills	C. W. Juels, P. R. Holvorcem	EOS	8.8 km	MPC · JPL
34840 Lawwaikuen	2001 SB_{268}	Lawwaikuen	September 25, 2001	Desert Eagle	W. K. Y. Yeung	·	5.3 km	MPC · JPL
34841 Ruthgottesman	2001 SE_{268}	Ruthgottesman	September 25, 2001	Desert Eagle	W. K. Y. Yeung	·	3.2 km	MPC · JPL
34842	2001 SU_{270}	—	September 16, 2001	Palomar	NEAT	·	7.6 km	MPC · JPL
34843	2001 SZ_{276}	—	September 21, 2001	Palomar	NEAT	·	3.1 km	MPC · JPL
34844 Malavshah	2001 SG_{277}	Malavshah	September 27, 2001	Socorro	LINEAR	NYS	2.3 km	MPC · JPL
34845	2001 SN_{278}	—	September 21, 2001	Anderson Mesa	LONEOS	·	11 km	MPC · JPL
34846 Vincent	2001 SY_{281}	Vincent	September 22, 2001	Anderson Mesa	LONEOS	EUP	9.8 km	MPC · JPL
34847	2001 SJ_{286}	—	September 21, 2001	Palomar	NEAT	EUN	3.7 km	MPC · JPL
34848	2001 SC_{288}	—	September 27, 2001	Palomar	NEAT	·	12 km	MPC · JPL
34849	2001 SG_{288}	—	September 27, 2001	Palomar	NEAT	EUN	5.4 km	MPC · JPL
34850	2001 TL_{8}	—	October 9, 2001	Socorro	LINEAR	CYB	13 km	MPC · JPL
34851	2001 TT_{8}	—	October 9, 2001	Socorro	LINEAR	·	2.4 km	MPC · JPL
34852 Shteyman	2001 TS_{12}	Shteyman	October 13, 2001	Socorro	LINEAR	·	2.5 km	MPC · JPL
34853	2001 TK_{16}	—	October 11, 2001	Socorro	LINEAR	·	8.3 km	MPC · JPL
34854 Paquifrutos	2001 TP_{17}	Paquifrutos	October 13, 2001	Pla D'Arguines	R. Ferrando	TIR	6.5 km	MPC · JPL
34855 Annaspektor	2001 TT_{30}	Annaspektor	October 14, 2001	Socorro	LINEAR	slow	2.2 km	MPC · JPL
34856 Savithas	2001 TR_{32}	Savithas	October 14, 2001	Socorro	LINEAR	V	2.5 km	MPC · JPL
34857 Sutaria	2001 TB_{36}	Sutaria	October 14, 2001	Socorro	LINEAR	·	5.1 km	MPC · JPL
34858	2001 TW_{44}	—	October 14, 2001	Socorro	LINEAR	·	3.2 km	MPC · JPL
34859 Lamshanmuk	2001 TR_{49}	Lamshanmuk	October 15, 2001	Desert Eagle	W. K. Y. Yeung	·	6.3 km	MPC · JPL
34860	2001 TJ_{77}	—	October 13, 2001	Socorro	LINEAR	VER	8.2 km	MPC · JPL
34861	2001 TY_{77}	—	October 13, 2001	Socorro	LINEAR	·	5.3 km	MPC · JPL
34862 Utkarshtandon	2001 TX_{79}	Utkarshtandon	October 13, 2001	Socorro	LINEAR	·	9.1 km	MPC · JPL
34863 Lientang	2001 TP_{107}	Lientang	October 13, 2001	Socorro	LINEAR	slow	4.6 km	MPC · JPL
34864	2001 TG_{114}	—	October 14, 2001	Socorro	LINEAR	EOS	6.8 km	MPC · JPL
34865	2001 TH_{116}	—	October 14, 2001	Socorro	LINEAR	·	12 km	MPC · JPL
34866	2001 TN_{119}	—	October 15, 2001	Socorro	LINEAR	EUN	3.9 km	MPC · JPL
34867	2001 TB_{121}	—	October 15, 2001	Socorro	LINEAR	ADE	11 km	MPC · JPL
34868	2001 TB_{136}	—	October 13, 2001	Palomar	NEAT	EOS	9.3 km	MPC · JPL
34869	2001 TD_{170}	—	October 15, 2001	Socorro	LINEAR	·	2.7 km	MPC · JPL
34870	2001 TS_{195}	—	October 15, 2001	Palomar	NEAT	·	4.5 km	MPC · JPL
34871 Howaiho	2001 UM_{2}	Howaiho	October 18, 2001	Desert Eagle	W. K. Y. Yeung	·	4.4 km	MPC · JPL
34872	2001 UV_{2}	—	October 20, 2001	Farpoint	G. Hug	·	5.0 km	MPC · JPL
34873	2001 UF_{6}	—	October 20, 2001	Ametlla de Mar	J. Nomen	EUN	6.1 km	MPC · JPL
34874 Tolwani	2001 UU_{9}	Tolwani	October 17, 2001	Socorro	LINEAR	·	2.7 km	MPC · JPL
34875	2001 US_{22}	—	October 17, 2001	Socorro	LINEAR	·	7.7 km	MPC · JPL
34876 Sofiatomov	2001 UK_{32}	Sofiatomov	October 16, 2001	Socorro	LINEAR	V	1.8 km	MPC · JPL
34877 Tremsin	2001 UQ_{34}	Tremsin	October 16, 2001	Socorro	LINEAR	·	2.5 km	MPC · JPL
34878	2001 UU_{34}	—	October 16, 2001	Socorro	LINEAR	EOS	4.5 km	MPC · JPL
34879 Tripathiishan	2001 UQ_{35}	Tripathiishan	October 16, 2001	Socorro	LINEAR	·	6.9 km	MPC · JPL
34880	2001 UN_{45}	—	October 17, 2001	Socorro	LINEAR	CYB	6.6 km	MPC · JPL
34881	2001 UF_{63}	—	October 17, 2001	Socorro	LINEAR	·	5.2 km	MPC · JPL
34882	2001 UK_{66}	—	October 18, 2001	Socorro	LINEAR	·	4.1 km	MPC · JPL
34883	2001 UQ_{94}	—	October 19, 2001	Haleakala	NEAT	·	8.8 km	MPC · JPL
34884	2001 UR_{119}	—	October 22, 2001	Socorro	LINEAR	·	3.2 km	MPC · JPL
34885	2001 VE_{12}	—	November 10, 2001	Socorro	LINEAR	·	6.8 km	MPC · JPL
34886	2001 VH_{12}	—	November 10, 2001	Socorro	LINEAR	·	4.4 km	MPC · JPL
34887	2001 VJ_{14}	—	November 10, 2001	Socorro	LINEAR	·	5.1 km	MPC · JPL
34888	2001 VP_{16}	—	November 7, 2001	Palomar	NEAT	EUN	5.0 km	MPC · JPL
34889	2001 VY_{33}	—	November 9, 2001	Socorro	LINEAR	·	1.9 km	MPC · JPL
34890 Vasikaran	2001 VS_{62}	Vasikaran	November 10, 2001	Socorro	LINEAR	SUL	6.7 km	MPC · JPL
34891 Elizabethpaige	2001 VR_{66}	Elizabethpaige	November 10, 2001	Socorro	LINEAR	V	2.1 km	MPC · JPL
34892 Evapalisa	2001 VW_{88}	Evapalisa	November 15, 2001	Uccle	H. Debehogne, E. W. Elst	(5)	3.3 km	MPC · JPL
34893 Mihomasatoshi	2001 WM_{1}	Mihomasatoshi	November 17, 2001	Bisei SG Center	BATTeRS	·	2.6 km	MPC · JPL
34894	2012 P-L	—	September 24, 1960	Palomar	C. J. van Houten, I. van Houten-Groeneveld, T. Gehrels	·	3.2 km	MPC · JPL
34895	2026 P-L	—	September 24, 1960	Palomar	C. J. van Houten, I. van Houten-Groeneveld, T. Gehrels	·	6.9 km	MPC · JPL
34896	2117 P-L	—	September 24, 1960	Palomar	C. J. van Houten, I. van Houten-Groeneveld, T. Gehrels	·	4.0 km	MPC · JPL
34897	2537 P-L	—	September 24, 1960	Palomar	C. J. van Houten, I. van Houten-Groeneveld, T. Gehrels	·	3.6 km	MPC · JPL
34898	2622 P-L	—	September 24, 1960	Palomar	C. J. van Houten, I. van Houten-Groeneveld, T. Gehrels	THM	8.7 km	MPC · JPL
34899	2628 P-L	—	September 24, 1960	Palomar	C. J. van Houten, I. van Houten-Groeneveld, T. Gehrels	·	4.0 km	MPC · JPL
34900	2698 P-L	—	September 24, 1960	Palomar	C. J. van Houten, I. van Houten-Groeneveld, T. Gehrels	·	2.5 km	MPC · JPL

== 34901–35000 ==
back to top

Designation			Discovery			Properties		Ref
Permanent	Provisional	Named after	Date	Site	Discoverer(s)	Category	Diam.	Ref
34901 Mauna Loa	2699 P-L	Mauna Loa	September 24, 1960	Palomar	C. J. van Houten, I. van Houten-Groeneveld, T. Gehrels	·	5.3 km	MPC · JPL
34902	2728 P-L	—	September 24, 1960	Palomar	C. J. van Houten, I. van Houten-Groeneveld, T. Gehrels	·	4.2 km	MPC · JPL
34903	3037 P-L	—	September 24, 1960	Palomar	C. J. van Houten, I. van Houten-Groeneveld, T. Gehrels	·	9.7 km	MPC · JPL
34904	3085 P-L	—	September 25, 1960	Palomar	C. J. van Houten, I. van Houten-Groeneveld, T. Gehrels	·	9.7 km	MPC · JPL
34905	3110 P-L	—	September 24, 1960	Palomar	C. J. van Houten, I. van Houten-Groeneveld, T. Gehrels	·	7.6 km	MPC · JPL
34906	3116 P-L	—	September 24, 1960	Palomar	C. J. van Houten, I. van Houten-Groeneveld, T. Gehrels	·	4.8 km	MPC · JPL
34907	3527 P-L	—	October 17, 1960	Palomar	C. J. van Houten, I. van Houten-Groeneveld, T. Gehrels	·	3.4 km	MPC · JPL
34908	3528 P-L	—	October 17, 1960	Palomar	C. J. van Houten, I. van Houten-Groeneveld, T. Gehrels	·	4.3 km	MPC · JPL
34909	3534 P-L	—	October 17, 1960	Palomar	C. J. van Houten, I. van Houten-Groeneveld, T. Gehrels	GAL	4.0 km	MPC · JPL
34910	4052 P-L	—	September 24, 1960	Palomar	C. J. van Houten, I. van Houten-Groeneveld, T. Gehrels	·	3.8 km	MPC · JPL
34911	4288 P-L	—	September 24, 1960	Palomar	C. J. van Houten, I. van Houten-Groeneveld, T. Gehrels	·	2.0 km	MPC · JPL
34912	4314 P-L	—	September 24, 1960	Palomar	C. J. van Houten, I. van Houten-Groeneveld, T. Gehrels	·	3.6 km	MPC · JPL
34913	4527 P-L	—	September 24, 1960	Palomar	C. J. van Houten, I. van Houten-Groeneveld, T. Gehrels	NYS	2.9 km	MPC · JPL
34914	4535 P-L	—	September 24, 1960	Palomar	C. J. van Houten, I. van Houten-Groeneveld, T. Gehrels	THM	7.9 km	MPC · JPL
34915	4564 P-L	—	September 24, 1960	Palomar	C. J. van Houten, I. van Houten-Groeneveld, T. Gehrels	THM	5.1 km	MPC · JPL
34916	4595 P-L	—	September 24, 1960	Palomar	C. J. van Houten, I. van Houten-Groeneveld, T. Gehrels	NYS ·	4.7 km	MPC · JPL
34917	4616 P-L	—	September 24, 1960	Palomar	C. J. van Houten, I. van Houten-Groeneveld, T. Gehrels	·	4.3 km	MPC · JPL
34918	4654 P-L	—	September 24, 1960	Palomar	C. J. van Houten, I. van Houten-Groeneveld, T. Gehrels	·	2.5 km	MPC · JPL
34919 Imelda	4710 P-L	Imelda	September 24, 1960	Palomar	C. J. van Houten, I. van Houten-Groeneveld, T. Gehrels	3:2	7.7 km	MPC · JPL
34920	4735 P-L	—	September 24, 1960	Palomar	C. J. van Houten, I. van Houten-Groeneveld, T. Gehrels	·	2.5 km	MPC · JPL
34921	4801 P-L	—	September 24, 1960	Palomar	C. J. van Houten, I. van Houten-Groeneveld, T. Gehrels	THM	7.1 km	MPC · JPL
34922	4825 P-L	—	September 24, 1960	Palomar	C. J. van Houten, I. van Houten-Groeneveld, T. Gehrels	·	4.5 km	MPC · JPL
34923	4870 P-L	—	September 24, 1960	Palomar	C. J. van Houten, I. van Houten-Groeneveld, T. Gehrels	·	2.7 km	MPC · JPL
34924	6109 P-L	—	September 24, 1960	Palomar	C. J. van Houten, I. van Houten-Groeneveld, T. Gehrels	·	3.2 km	MPC · JPL
34925	6114 P-L	—	September 24, 1960	Palomar	C. J. van Houten, I. van Houten-Groeneveld, T. Gehrels	EUN	4.8 km	MPC · JPL
34926	6133 P-L	—	September 24, 1960	Palomar	C. J. van Houten, I. van Houten-Groeneveld, T. Gehrels	·	3.1 km	MPC · JPL
34927	6189 P-L	—	September 24, 1960	Palomar	C. J. van Houten, I. van Houten-Groeneveld, T. Gehrels	·	2.0 km	MPC · JPL
34928	6230 P-L	—	September 24, 1960	Palomar	C. J. van Houten, I. van Houten-Groeneveld, T. Gehrels	·	2.7 km	MPC · JPL
34929	6522 P-L	—	September 26, 1960	Palomar	C. J. van Houten, I. van Houten-Groeneveld, T. Gehrels	THM	9.6 km	MPC · JPL
34930	6570 P-L	—	September 24, 1960	Palomar	C. J. van Houten, I. van Houten-Groeneveld, T. Gehrels	·	2.7 km	MPC · JPL
34931	6621 P-L	—	September 24, 1960	Palomar	C. J. van Houten, I. van Houten-Groeneveld, T. Gehrels	EUN	3.7 km	MPC · JPL
34932	6644 P-L	—	September 26, 1960	Palomar	C. J. van Houten, I. van Houten-Groeneveld, T. Gehrels	·	3.3 km	MPC · JPL
34933	6652 P-L	—	September 24, 1960	Palomar	C. J. van Houten, I. van Houten-Groeneveld, T. Gehrels	THM	8.6 km	MPC · JPL
34934	6689 P-L	—	September 24, 1960	Palomar	C. J. van Houten, I. van Houten-Groeneveld, T. Gehrels	·	8.6 km	MPC · JPL
34935	6780 P-L	—	September 24, 1960	Palomar	C. J. van Houten, I. van Houten-Groeneveld, T. Gehrels	·	7.6 km	MPC · JPL
34936	6861 P-L	—	September 24, 1960	Palomar	C. J. van Houten, I. van Houten-Groeneveld, T. Gehrels	·	4.7 km	MPC · JPL
34937	9063 P-L	—	October 17, 1960	Palomar	C. J. van Houten, I. van Houten-Groeneveld, T. Gehrels	(1338) (FLO)	2.7 km	MPC · JPL
34938	9562 P-L	—	October 17, 1960	Palomar	C. J. van Houten, I. van Houten-Groeneveld, T. Gehrels	·	5.0 km	MPC · JPL
34939	9575 P-L	—	October 17, 1960	Palomar	C. J. van Houten, I. van Houten-Groeneveld, T. Gehrels	·	3.6 km	MPC · JPL
34940	9586 P-L	—	October 17, 1960	Palomar	C. J. van Houten, I. van Houten-Groeneveld, T. Gehrels	HYG	9.0 km	MPC · JPL
34941	1244 T-1	—	March 25, 1971	Palomar	C. J. van Houten, I. van Houten-Groeneveld, T. Gehrels	HOF	7.7 km	MPC · JPL
34942	1275 T-1	—	March 25, 1971	Palomar	C. J. van Houten, I. van Houten-Groeneveld, T. Gehrels	·	1.8 km	MPC · JPL
34943	1286 T-1	—	March 25, 1971	Palomar	C. J. van Houten, I. van Houten-Groeneveld, T. Gehrels	·	3.4 km	MPC · JPL
34944	2202 T-1	—	March 25, 1971	Palomar	C. J. van Houten, I. van Houten-Groeneveld, T. Gehrels	·	6.0 km	MPC · JPL
34945	2263 T-1	—	March 25, 1971	Palomar	C. J. van Houten, I. van Houten-Groeneveld, T. Gehrels	·	2.4 km	MPC · JPL
34946	2286 T-1	—	March 25, 1971	Palomar	C. J. van Houten, I. van Houten-Groeneveld, T. Gehrels	·	5.0 km	MPC · JPL
34947	3298 T-1	—	March 26, 1971	Palomar	C. J. van Houten, I. van Houten-Groeneveld, T. Gehrels	·	5.8 km	MPC · JPL
34948	4103 T-1	—	March 26, 1971	Palomar	C. J. van Houten, I. van Houten-Groeneveld, T. Gehrels	NYS	2.9 km	MPC · JPL
34949	4111 T-1	—	March 26, 1971	Palomar	C. J. van Houten, I. van Houten-Groeneveld, T. Gehrels	·	6.2 km	MPC · JPL
34950	4188 T-1	—	March 26, 1971	Palomar	C. J. van Houten, I. van Houten-Groeneveld, T. Gehrels	·	1.8 km	MPC · JPL
34951	4221 T-1	—	March 26, 1971	Palomar	C. J. van Houten, I. van Houten-Groeneveld, T. Gehrels	·	6.4 km	MPC · JPL
34952	4874 T-1	—	May 13, 1971	Palomar	C. J. van Houten, I. van Houten-Groeneveld, T. Gehrels	·	5.5 km	MPC · JPL
34953	1008 T-2	—	September 29, 1973	Palomar	C. J. van Houten, I. van Houten-Groeneveld, T. Gehrels	·	6.3 km	MPC · JPL
34954	1032 T-2	—	September 29, 1973	Palomar	C. J. van Houten, I. van Houten-Groeneveld, T. Gehrels	·	5.4 km	MPC · JPL
34955	1044 T-2	—	September 29, 1973	Palomar	C. J. van Houten, I. van Houten-Groeneveld, T. Gehrels	·	2.9 km	MPC · JPL
34956	1327 T-2	—	September 29, 1973	Palomar	C. J. van Houten, I. van Houten-Groeneveld, T. Gehrels	·	7.4 km	MPC · JPL
34957	1347 T-2	—	September 29, 1973	Palomar	C. J. van Houten, I. van Houten-Groeneveld, T. Gehrels	THM	7.3 km	MPC · JPL
34958	1357 T-2	—	September 29, 1973	Palomar	C. J. van Houten, I. van Houten-Groeneveld, T. Gehrels	·	4.1 km	MPC · JPL
34959	2077 T-2	—	September 29, 1973	Palomar	C. J. van Houten, I. van Houten-Groeneveld, T. Gehrels	·	1.8 km	MPC · JPL
34960	2100 T-2	—	September 29, 1973	Palomar	C. J. van Houten, I. van Houten-Groeneveld, T. Gehrels	·	6.3 km	MPC · JPL
34961	2252 T-2	—	September 29, 1973	Palomar	C. J. van Houten, I. van Houten-Groeneveld, T. Gehrels	GEF	4.9 km	MPC · JPL
34962	2307 T-2	—	September 29, 1973	Palomar	C. J. van Houten, I. van Houten-Groeneveld, T. Gehrels	·	4.6 km	MPC · JPL
34963	3091 T-2	—	September 30, 1973	Palomar	C. J. van Houten, I. van Houten-Groeneveld, T. Gehrels	GEF	3.1 km	MPC · JPL
34964	3122 T-2	—	September 30, 1973	Palomar	C. J. van Houten, I. van Houten-Groeneveld, T. Gehrels	·	5.9 km	MPC · JPL
34965	3221 T-2	—	September 30, 1973	Palomar	C. J. van Houten, I. van Houten-Groeneveld, T. Gehrels	THM	5.5 km	MPC · JPL
34966	3260 T-2	—	September 30, 1973	Palomar	C. J. van Houten, I. van Houten-Groeneveld, T. Gehrels	·	5.9 km	MPC · JPL
34967	3269 T-2	—	September 30, 1973	Palomar	C. J. van Houten, I. van Houten-Groeneveld, T. Gehrels	DOR	6.8 km	MPC · JPL
34968	4094 T-2	—	September 29, 1973	Palomar	C. J. van Houten, I. van Houten-Groeneveld, T. Gehrels	·	6.8 km	MPC · JPL
34969	4108 T-2	—	September 29, 1973	Palomar	C. J. van Houten, I. van Houten-Groeneveld, T. Gehrels	·	2.0 km	MPC · JPL
34970	4218 T-2	—	September 29, 1973	Palomar	C. J. van Houten, I. van Houten-Groeneveld, T. Gehrels	·	7.5 km	MPC · JPL
34971	4286 T-2	—	September 29, 1973	Palomar	C. J. van Houten, I. van Houten-Groeneveld, T. Gehrels	EOS	4.6 km	MPC · JPL
34972	5039 T-2	—	September 25, 1973	Palomar	C. J. van Houten, I. van Houten-Groeneveld, T. Gehrels	·	6.3 km	MPC · JPL
34973	5157 T-2	—	September 25, 1973	Palomar	C. J. van Houten, I. van Houten-Groeneveld, T. Gehrels	EOS	3.5 km	MPC · JPL
34974	5164 T-2	—	September 25, 1973	Palomar	C. J. van Houten, I. van Houten-Groeneveld, T. Gehrels	·	7.2 km	MPC · JPL
34975	1050 T-3	—	October 17, 1977	Palomar	C. J. van Houten, I. van Houten-Groeneveld, T. Gehrels	·	8.8 km	MPC · JPL
34976	1115 T-3	—	October 17, 1977	Palomar	C. J. van Houten, I. van Houten-Groeneveld, T. Gehrels	·	2.5 km	MPC · JPL
34977	1167 T-3	—	October 17, 1977	Palomar	C. J. van Houten, I. van Houten-Groeneveld, T. Gehrels	·	6.3 km	MPC · JPL
34978 van 't Hoff	1901 T-3	van 't Hoff	October 17, 1977	Palomar	C. J. van Houten, I. van Houten-Groeneveld, T. Gehrels	VER	10 km	MPC · JPL
34979	2173 T-3	—	October 16, 1977	Palomar	C. J. van Houten, I. van Houten-Groeneveld, T. Gehrels	·	2.7 km	MPC · JPL
34980	2307 T-3	—	October 16, 1977	Palomar	C. J. van Houten, I. van Houten-Groeneveld, T. Gehrels	·	2.4 km	MPC · JPL
34981	2342 T-3	—	October 16, 1977	Palomar	C. J. van Houten, I. van Houten-Groeneveld, T. Gehrels	·	2.1 km	MPC · JPL
34982	2494 T-3	—	October 16, 1977	Palomar	C. J. van Houten, I. van Houten-Groeneveld, T. Gehrels	·	2.4 km	MPC · JPL
34983	3046 T-3	—	October 16, 1977	Palomar	C. J. van Houten, I. van Houten-Groeneveld, T. Gehrels	·	2.2 km	MPC · JPL
34984	3163 T-3	—	October 16, 1977	Palomar	C. J. van Houten, I. van Houten-Groeneveld, T. Gehrels	LUT	11 km	MPC · JPL
34985	3286 T-3	—	October 16, 1977	Palomar	C. J. van Houten, I. van Houten-Groeneveld, T. Gehrels	slow	5.6 km	MPC · JPL
34986	3837 T-3	—	October 16, 1977	Palomar	C. J. van Houten, I. van Houten-Groeneveld, T. Gehrels	·	4.5 km	MPC · JPL
34987	4065 T-3	—	October 16, 1977	Palomar	C. J. van Houten, I. van Houten-Groeneveld, T. Gehrels	HYG	8.3 km	MPC · JPL
34988	4222 T-3	—	October 16, 1977	Palomar	C. J. van Houten, I. van Houten-Groeneveld, T. Gehrels	GEF	3.3 km	MPC · JPL
34989	4251 T-3	—	October 16, 1977	Palomar	C. J. van Houten, I. van Houten-Groeneveld, T. Gehrels	·	3.9 km	MPC · JPL
34990	4270 T-3	—	October 16, 1977	Palomar	C. J. van Houten, I. van Houten-Groeneveld, T. Gehrels	·	5.4 km	MPC · JPL
34991	4295 T-3	—	October 16, 1977	Palomar	C. J. van Houten, I. van Houten-Groeneveld, T. Gehrels	·	2.4 km	MPC · JPL
34992	4418 T-3	—	October 16, 1977	Palomar	C. J. van Houten, I. van Houten-Groeneveld, T. Gehrels	·	3.9 km	MPC · JPL
34993 Euaimon	1973 SR_{1}	Euaimon	September 20, 1973	Palomar	C. J. van Houten, I. van Houten-Groeneveld, T. Gehrels	L4	20 km	MPC · JPL
34994	1977 CS_{1}	—	February 11, 1977	Palomar	S. J. Bus	·	3.7 km	MPC · JPL
34995 Dainihonshi	1977 DP_{2}	Dainihonshi	February 18, 1977	Kiso	H. Kosai, K. Furukawa	·	5.7 km	MPC · JPL
34996 Mitokoumon	1977 DH_{4}	Mitokoumon	February 18, 1977	Kiso	H. Kosai, K. Furukawa	·	4.2 km	MPC · JPL
34997	1978 OP	—	July 28, 1978	Bickley	Perth Observatory	EUN	6.8 km	MPC · JPL
34998	1978 SE	—	September 27, 1978	La Silla	R. M. West	·	7.6 km	MPC · JPL
34999	1978 VC_{3}	—	November 7, 1978	Palomar	E. F. Helin, S. J. Bus	·	7.3 km	MPC · JPL
35000	1978 VN_{3}	—	November 7, 1978	Palomar	E. F. Helin, S. J. Bus	NEM	4.4 km	MPC · JPL

back to top

== See also ==
- Meanings of minor-planet names: 34001–35000
