= Yarkovsky =

Yarkovsky may refer to:

- Ivan Yarkovsky (1844–1902), Polish-Russian civil engineer
  - 35334 Yarkovsky, a main-belt asteroid named after him
- Yarkovsky District, a district of Tyumen Oblast, Russia
- Yarkovsky effect, a force acting on a rotating body in space

== See also ==
- Yarkovo
