= 7794 Sanvito =

Asteroid

Discovery
- Discovered by: U. Munari; M. Tombelli
- Discovery site: Cima Ekar Observing Stn.
- Discovery date: 15 January 1996

Designations
- Named after: Roberto di San Vito (Italian amateur astronomer)
- Alternative designations: 1996 AD_{4} · 1980 TH_{6} 1987 QG_{5} · 1987 SM_{24} 1987 UF_{7} · 1993 HC_{8}
- Minor planet category: main-belt · (inner); Vesta

Orbital characteristics
- Epoch 23 March 2018 (JD 2458200.5)
- Uncertainty parameter 0
- Observation arc: 37.30 yr (13,625 d)
- Aphelion: 2.6417 AU
- Perihelion: 1.9626 AU
- Semi-major axis: 2.3021 AU
- Eccentricity: 0.1475
- Orbital period (sidereal): 3.49 yr (1,276 d)
- Mean anomaly: 308.03°
- Mean motion: 0° 16^{m} 55.92^{s} / day
- Inclination: 5.6731°
- Longitude of ascending node: 221.43°
- Argument of perihelion: 86.191°

Physical characteristics
- Mean diameter: 4.558±0.169 km
- Geometric albedo: 0.309±0.092
- Absolute magnitude (H): 14.0

7794 Sanvito, provisional designation 1996 AD_{4}, is a bright Vestian asteroid from the inner regions of the asteroid belt, approximately 4.6 kilometers (2.9 miles) in diameter. It was discovered on 15 January 1996, by Italian astronomers Ulisse Munari and Maura Tombelli at the Cima Ekar Observing Station in Tuscany, Italy. The likely V-type asteroid was named after Italian amateur astronomer Roberto di San Vito.

== Orbit and classification ==
Sanvito is a core member of the Vesta family. Vestian asteroids have a composition akin to cumulate eucrites (HED meteorites) and are thought to have originated deep within 4 Vesta's crust, possibly from the Rheasilvia crater, a large impact crater on its southern hemisphere near the South pole, formed as a result of a subcatastrophic collision. Vesta is the main belt's second-largest and second-most-massive body after Ceres.

It orbits the Sun in the inner main-belt at a distance of 2.0–2.6 AU once every 3 years and 6 months (1,276 days; semi-major axis of 2.3 AU). Its orbit has an eccentricity of 0.15 and an inclination of 6° with respect to the ecliptic. The body's observation arc begins with its first observations as 1980 TH_{6} at Crimea-Nauchnij in October 1980, more than 15 years prior to its official discovery observation at Cima Ekar.

== Physical characteristics ==
Sanvito has an absolute magnitude of 14.0. Its spectral type is unknown. Based on its high albedo (see below) measured by the Wide-field Infrared Survey Explorer (WISE) and its classification into the Vesta family, Sanvito is likely a V-type asteroid. As of 2018, no rotational lightcurve of this asteroid has been obtained from photometric observations. The body's rotation period, pole and shape remain unknown.

=== Diameter and albedo ===
According to the survey carried out by the NEOWISE mission of NASA's WISE telescope, Sanvito measures 4.558 kilometers in diameter and its surface has a high albedo of 0.309.

== Naming ==
This minor planet was named after Roberto di San Vito, an Italian amateur astronomer committed to astrometric observations. He is also a supporter of a new observatory in Montelupo Fiorentino, Tuscany. The official naming citation was published by the Minor Planet Center on 5 October 1998 (M.P.C. 32790).

== In fiction ==
In the "Sources" section of the science fiction novel 3001: The Final Odyssey, the author, Arthur C. Clarke, jokingly refers to a prediction he made in the first book of the series, 2001: A Space Odyssey (published in 1968), of an Asteroid 7794 being discovered by a "lunar observatory" in 1997. This asteroid had a projectile fired at it by the spaceship Discovery as it passed by on its way to Saturn so that instruments aboard the Discovery might analyze the asteroid's composition.

In the film of the same name, a pair of asteroids is shown, presumably 7794 imagined as a binary asteroid, in rapid travel, with the spaceship Discovery One in the background, which given its tiny size must be tens of kilometers away. The representation is consistent with what was already known at the time of the shooting (1965-1968) on the characteristics of asteroids and on the fact that in the main belt the average distance between the bodies that constitute it is many hundreds of thousands of kilometers.
