= Yarkovo =

Yarkovo (Russian: Ярково) is the name of several rural localities in Russia:

- Yarkovo, Novgorod Oblast, a village in Novorakhinskoye Settlement of Krestetsky District of Novgorod Oblast
- Yarkovo, Kuybyshevsky District, Novosibirsk Oblast, a village in Kuybyshevsky District, Novosibirsk Oblast
- Yarkovo, Novosibirsky District, Novosibirsk Oblast, a selo in Novosibirsky District, Novosibirsk Oblast
- Yarkovo, Omsk Oblast, a selo in Yarkovsky Rural Okrug of Ust-Ishimsky District of Omsk Oblast
- Yarkovo, Tver Oblast, a village in Zavolzhskoye Rural Settlement of Kalininsky District of Tver Oblast
- Yarkovo, Tyumen Oblast, a selo in Yarkovsky Rural Okrug of Yarkovsky District of Tyumen Oblast
- Yarkovo, Yaroslavl Oblast, a village in Velikoselsky Rural Okrug of Gavrilov-Yamsky District of Yaroslavl Oblast
