= List of minor planets: 35001–36000 =

The following is a partial list of minor planets, running from minor-planet number 35001 through 36000, inclusive. The primary data for this and other partial lists is based on JPL's "Small-Body Orbital Elements" and data available from the Minor Planet Center. Critical list information is also provided by the MPC, unless otherwise specified from Lowell Observatory. A detailed description of the table's columns and additional sources are given on the main page including a complete list of every page in this series, and a statistical break-up on the dynamical classification of minor planets.

Also see the summary list of all named bodies in numerical and alphabetical order, and the corresponding naming citations for the number range of this particular list. New namings may only be added to this list after official publication, as the preannouncement of names is condemned by the Working Group for Small Bodies Nomenclature of the International Astronomical Union.

Near-Earth obj.	MBA (inner)	MBA (outer)	Centaur
Mars-crosser	MBA (middle)	Jupiter trojan	Trans-Neptunian obj.
Unclassified

== 35001–35100 ==
Designation			Discovery			Properties		Ref
Permanent	Provisional	Named after	Date	Site	Discoverer(s)	Category	Diam.	Ref
35001	1978 VN_{4}	—	November 7, 1978	Palomar	E. F. Helin, S. J. Bus	MAS	1.8 km	MPC; JPL
35002	1978 VY_{8}	—	November 7, 1978	Palomar	E. F. Helin, S. J. Bus	·	10 km	MPC; JPL
35003	1979 MT_{1}	—	June 25, 1979	Siding Spring	E. F. Helin, S. J. Bus	·	2.0 km	MPC; JPL
35004	1979 MC_{3}	—	June 25, 1979	Siding Spring	E. F. Helin, S. J. Bus	·	2.3 km	MPC; JPL
35005	1979 MY_{3}	—	June 25, 1979	Siding Spring	E. F. Helin, S. J. Bus	·	3.2 km	MPC; JPL
35006	1979 ON_{8}	—	July 24, 1979	Siding Spring	S. J. Bus	·	4.9 km	MPC; JPL
35007	1979 OD_{11}	—	July 24, 1979	Siding Spring	S. J. Bus	·	4.1 km	MPC; JPL
35008	1980 FZ_{2}	—	March 16, 1980	La Silla	C.-I. Lagerkvist	·	4.6 km	MPC; JPL
35009	1980 US_{1}	—	October 31, 1980	Palomar	S. J. Bus	·	2.2 km	MPC; JPL
35010	1981 DV_{1}	—	February 28, 1981	Siding Spring	S. J. Bus	slow	3.6 km	MPC; JPL
35011	1981 DU_{2}	—	February 28, 1981	Siding Spring	S. J. Bus	·	5.0 km	MPC; JPL
35012	1981 EU_{2}	—	March 2, 1981	Siding Spring	S. J. Bus	·	4.4 km	MPC; JPL
35013	1981 EL_{3}	—	March 2, 1981	Siding Spring	S. J. Bus	GEF	2.3 km	MPC; JPL
35014	1981 EX_{5}	—	March 7, 1981	Siding Spring	S. J. Bus	·	4.2 km	MPC; JPL
35015	1981 EO_{6}	—	March 6, 1981	Siding Spring	S. J. Bus	·	2.4 km	MPC; JPL
35016	1981 EC_{7}	—	March 6, 1981	Siding Spring	S. J. Bus	HIL · 3:2	12 km	MPC; JPL
35017	1981 EG_{7}	—	March 6, 1981	Siding Spring	S. J. Bus	V	1.5 km	MPC; JPL
35018	1981 EX_{9}	—	March 1, 1981	Siding Spring	S. J. Bus	·	4.6 km	MPC; JPL
35019	1981 EH_{10}	—	March 1, 1981	Siding Spring	S. J. Bus	V	1.9 km	MPC; JPL
35020	1981 EJ_{12}	—	March 1, 1981	Siding Spring	S. J. Bus	·	5.7 km	MPC; JPL
35021	1981 ER_{12}	—	March 1, 1981	Siding Spring	S. J. Bus	·	4.1 km	MPC; JPL
35022	1981 EK_{13}	—	March 1, 1981	Siding Spring	S. J. Bus	V	1.8 km	MPC; JPL
35023	1981 EO_{14}	—	March 1, 1981	Siding Spring	S. J. Bus	·	6.6 km	MPC; JPL
35024	1981 EV_{14}	—	March 1, 1981	Siding Spring	S. J. Bus	·	6.3 km	MPC; JPL
35025	1981 EA_{15}	—	March 1, 1981	Siding Spring	S. J. Bus	(31811)	4.5 km	MPC; JPL
35026	1981 EM_{16}	—	March 6, 1981	Siding Spring	S. J. Bus	·	4.4 km	MPC; JPL
35027	1981 ET_{18}	—	March 2, 1981	Siding Spring	S. J. Bus	·	2.0 km	MPC; JPL
35028	1981 ET_{21}	—	March 2, 1981	Siding Spring	S. J. Bus	·	2.0 km	MPC; JPL
35029	1981 EM_{22}	—	March 2, 1981	Siding Spring	S. J. Bus	NYS	1.6 km	MPC; JPL
35030	1981 EW_{22}	—	March 2, 1981	Siding Spring	S. J. Bus	·	4.0 km	MPC; JPL
35031	1981 EE_{23}	—	March 3, 1981	Siding Spring	S. J. Bus	·	4.6 km	MPC; JPL
35032	1981 EL_{26}	—	March 2, 1981	Siding Spring	S. J. Bus	·	5.1 km	MPC; JPL
35033	1981 EA_{27}	—	March 2, 1981	Siding Spring	S. J. Bus	·	6.7 km	MPC; JPL
35034	1981 EF_{27}	—	March 2, 1981	Siding Spring	S. J. Bus	·	3.2 km	MPC; JPL
35035	1981 ER_{29}	—	March 1, 1981	Siding Spring	S. J. Bus	·	4.3 km	MPC; JPL
35036	1981 EC_{30}	—	March 2, 1981	Siding Spring	S. J. Bus	·	6.9 km	MPC; JPL
35037	1981 EC_{32}	—	March 6, 1981	Siding Spring	S. J. Bus	·	4.5 km	MPC; JPL
35038	1981 EL_{32}	—	March 7, 1981	Siding Spring	S. J. Bus	·	4.0 km	MPC; JPL
35039	1981 EE_{33}	—	March 1, 1981	Siding Spring	S. J. Bus	·	2.7 km	MPC; JPL
35040	1981 EV_{33}	—	March 1, 1981	Siding Spring	S. J. Bus	HNS	3.1 km	MPC; JPL
35041	1981 ER_{34}	—	March 2, 1981	Siding Spring	S. J. Bus	VER	5.1 km	MPC; JPL
35042	1981 EO_{36}	—	March 7, 1981	Siding Spring	S. J. Bus	·	3.7 km	MPC; JPL
35043	1981 EH_{38}	—	March 1, 1981	Siding Spring	S. J. Bus	·	2.6 km	MPC; JPL
35044	1981 ET_{40}	—	March 2, 1981	Siding Spring	S. J. Bus	·	3.6 km	MPC; JPL
35045	1981 EB_{42}	—	March 2, 1981	Siding Spring	S. J. Bus	·	5.2 km	MPC; JPL
35046	1981 EL_{43}	—	March 3, 1981	Siding Spring	S. J. Bus	·	3.5 km	MPC; JPL
35047	1981 EF_{44}	—	March 6, 1981	Siding Spring	S. J. Bus	HYG	6.6 km	MPC; JPL
35048	1981 EF_{45}	—	March 15, 1981	Siding Spring	S. J. Bus	·	5.4 km	MPC; JPL
35049	1981 EE_{46}	—	March 2, 1981	Siding Spring	S. J. Bus	·	6.3 km	MPC; JPL
35050	1981 EA_{47}	—	March 2, 1981	Siding Spring	S. J. Bus	·	3.4 km	MPC; JPL
35051	1981 ED_{47}	—	March 2, 1981	Siding Spring	S. J. Bus	NYS	1.6 km	MPC; JPL
35052	1982 JY_{1}	—	May 15, 1982	Palomar	Palomar	·	7.2 km	MPC; JPL
35053 Rojyurij	1982 UA_{11}	Rojyurij	October 25, 1982	Nauchnij	L. V. Zhuravleva	NYS	4.0 km	MPC; JPL
35054	1983 WK	—	November 28, 1983	Anderson Mesa	E. Bowell	·	6.0 km	MPC; JPL
35055	1984 RB	—	September 2, 1984	Palomar	E. F. Helin	H	1.5 km	MPC; JPL
35056 Cullers	1984 ST	Cullers	September 28, 1984	Palomar	C. S. Shoemaker, E. M. Shoemaker	·	4.6 km	MPC; JPL
35057	1984 SP_{4}	—	September 23, 1984	La Silla	H. Debehogne	·	3.2 km	MPC; JPL
35058	1985 RP_{4}	—	September 12, 1985	La Silla	H. Debehogne	·	3.6 km	MPC; JPL
35059	1986 QM_{1}	—	August 27, 1986	La Silla	H. Debehogne	·	1.8 km	MPC; JPL
35060	1986 QG_{3}	—	August 29, 1986	La Silla	H. Debehogne	·	4.4 km	MPC; JPL
35061	1986 QL_{3}	—	August 29, 1986	La Silla	H. Debehogne	·	3.6 km	MPC; JPL
35062 Sakuranosyou	1988 EP	Sakuranosyou	March 12, 1988	Kobuchizawa	Inoue, M., O. Muramatsu	·	3.2 km	MPC; JPL
35063	1988 FD	—	March 16, 1988	Kushiro	S. Ueda, H. Kaneda	PHO	6.0 km	MPC; JPL
35064	1988 RE_{10}	—	September 14, 1988	Cerro Tololo	S. J. Bus	·	3.1 km	MPC; JPL
35065	1988 SU_{1}	—	September 16, 1988	Cerro Tololo	S. J. Bus	EOS	8.0 km	MPC; JPL
35066	1988 SV_{1}	—	September 16, 1988	Cerro Tololo	S. J. Bus	·	5.2 km	MPC; JPL
35067	1989 LL	—	June 4, 1989	Palomar	E. F. Helin	·	3.4 km	MPC; JPL
35068	1989 SF_{4}	—	September 26, 1989	La Silla	E. W. Elst	EOS	5.6 km	MPC; JPL
35069	1989 SH_{4}	—	September 26, 1989	La Silla	E. W. Elst	·	2.7 km	MPC; JPL
35070	1989 TE_{3}	—	October 7, 1989	La Silla	E. W. Elst	·	5.5 km	MPC; JPL
35071	1989 TE_{5}	—	October 7, 1989	La Silla	E. W. Elst	·	3.7 km	MPC; JPL
35072	1989 TX_{6}	—	October 7, 1989	La Silla	E. W. Elst	·	2.5 km	MPC; JPL
35073	1989 TG_{16}	—	October 4, 1989	La Silla	H. Debehogne	MAS	1.8 km	MPC; JPL
35074	1989 UF_{1}	—	October 25, 1989	Gekko	Y. Oshima	·	4.3 km	MPC; JPL
35075	1989 XW_{1}	—	December 2, 1989	La Silla	E. W. Elst	EOS	7.0 km	MPC; JPL
35076 Yataro	1990 BA_{1}	Yataro	January 21, 1990	Geisei	T. Seki	·	11 km	MPC; JPL
35077	1990 OT_{2}	—	July 30, 1990	Palomar	H. E. Holt	·	2.6 km	MPC; JPL
35078	1990 QB_{7}	—	August 20, 1990	La Silla	E. W. Elst	·	3.7 km	MPC; JPL
35079	1990 QR_{7}	—	August 16, 1990	La Silla	E. W. Elst	·	1.8 km	MPC; JPL
35080	1990 QH_{8}	—	August 16, 1990	La Silla	E. W. Elst	·	4.4 km	MPC; JPL
35081	1990 QT_{8}	—	August 16, 1990	La Silla	E. W. Elst	·	2.2 km	MPC; JPL
35082	1990 RJ_{3}	—	September 14, 1990	Palomar	H. E. Holt	·	2.1 km	MPC; JPL
35083	1990 SP_{6}	—	September 22, 1990	La Silla	E. W. Elst	BAP	2.7 km	MPC; JPL
35084	1990 SP_{9}	—	September 22, 1990	La Silla	E. W. Elst	·	2.2 km	MPC; JPL
35085	1990 SL_{11}	—	September 16, 1990	Palomar	H. E. Holt	slow	3.1 km	MPC; JPL
35086	1990 TW_{8}	—	October 14, 1990	Kleť	A. Mrkos	(2076)	3.6 km	MPC; JPL
35087 von Sydow	1990 UE_{5}	von Sydow	October 16, 1990	La Silla	E. W. Elst	H	1.8 km	MPC; JPL
35088	1990 VU_{4}	—	November 15, 1990	La Silla	E. W. Elst	·	2.0 km	MPC; JPL
35089	1990 WH_{1}	—	November 18, 1990	La Silla	E. W. Elst	·	3.0 km	MPC; JPL
35090	1990 WR_{1}	—	November 18, 1990	La Silla	E. W. Elst	·	2.7 km	MPC; JPL
35091	1990 WC_{2}	—	November 18, 1990	La Silla	E. W. Elst	EOS	5.3 km	MPC; JPL
35092	1990 WK_{6}	—	November 21, 1990	La Silla	E. W. Elst	·	3.0 km	MPC; JPL
35093 Akicity	1991 EH_{1}	Akicity	March 14, 1991	Geisei	T. Seki	HYG	9.2 km	MPC; JPL
35094	1991 GW_{2}	—	April 8, 1991	La Silla	E. W. Elst	THM	8.2 km	MPC; JPL
35095	1991 GY_{3}	—	April 8, 1991	La Silla	E. W. Elst	NYS	3.4 km	MPC; JPL
35096	1991 GV_{4}	—	April 8, 1991	La Silla	E. W. Elst	NYS	2.4 km	MPC; JPL
35097	1991 GS_{5}	—	April 8, 1991	La Silla	E. W. Elst	·	3.0 km	MPC; JPL
35098	1991 GB_{7}	—	April 8, 1991	La Silla	E. W. Elst	·	11 km	MPC; JPL
35099	1991 GY_{7}	—	April 8, 1991	La Silla	E. W. Elst	NYS ·	4.6 km	MPC; JPL
35100	1991 NK	—	July 8, 1991	Palomar	E. F. Helin	JUN	3.1 km	MPC; JPL

== 35101–35200 ==
back to top

Designation			Discovery			Properties		Ref
Permanent	Provisional	Named after	Date	Site	Discoverer(s)	Category	Diam.	Ref
35101	1991 PL_{16}	—	August 7, 1991	Palomar	H. E. Holt	·	3.9 km	MPC; JPL
35102	1991 RT	—	September 4, 1991	Palomar	E. F. Helin	·	4.4 km	MPC; JPL
35103	1991 RZ_{14}	—	September 15, 1991	Palomar	H. E. Holt	KOR	7.2 km	MPC; JPL
35104	1991 RP_{17}	—	September 11, 1991	Palomar	H. E. Holt	·	6.5 km	MPC; JPL
35105	1991 RP_{23}	—	September 15, 1991	Palomar	H. E. Holt	MAR	5.5 km	MPC; JPL
35106	1991 TE_{11}	—	October 11, 1991	Kitt Peak	Spacewatch	·	3.3 km	MPC; JPL
35107	1991 VH	—	November 9, 1991	Siding Spring	R. H. McNaught	APO +1km · PHA · moon	930 m	MPC; JPL
35108	1991 VZ_{7}	—	November 3, 1991	Kitt Peak	Spacewatch	DOR	5.1 km	MPC; JPL
35109	1991 XM	—	December 4, 1991	Kushiro	S. Ueda, H. Kaneda	·	7.2 km	MPC; JPL
35110	1992 BJ_{2}	—	January 30, 1992	La Silla	E. W. Elst	(2076)	2.4 km	MPC; JPL
35111	1992 BH_{4}	—	January 29, 1992	Kitt Peak	Spacewatch	·	1.4 km	MPC; JPL
35112	1992 BT_{5}	—	January 30, 1992	La Silla	E. W. Elst	·	1.7 km	MPC; JPL
35113	1992 CR_{2}	—	February 2, 1992	La Silla	E. W. Elst	(254)	3.1 km	MPC; JPL
35114	1992 DC_{7}	—	February 29, 1992	La Silla	UESAC	KOR	4.8 km	MPC; JPL
35115	1992 DN_{8}	—	February 29, 1992	La Silla	UESAC	·	6.1 km	MPC; JPL
35116	1992 DV_{8}	—	February 29, 1992	La Silla	UESAC	·	3.6 km	MPC; JPL
35117	1992 DN_{9}	—	February 29, 1992	La Silla	UESAC	·	1.6 km	MPC; JPL
35118	1992 EV_{5}	—	March 2, 1992	La Silla	UESAC	V	2.8 km	MPC; JPL
35119	1992 EY_{6}	—	March 1, 1992	La Silla	UESAC	·	9.6 km	MPC; JPL
35120	1992 EN_{7}	—	March 1, 1992	La Silla	UESAC	·	2.7 km	MPC; JPL
35121	1992 EP_{8}	—	March 2, 1992	La Silla	UESAC	·	2.2 km	MPC; JPL
35122	1992 ET_{15}	—	March 1, 1992	La Silla	UESAC	·	2.2 km	MPC; JPL
35123	1992 EB_{17}	—	March 1, 1992	La Silla	UESAC	·	1.9 km	MPC; JPL
35124	1992 EU_{21}	—	March 1, 1992	La Silla	UESAC	·	8.6 km	MPC; JPL
35125	1992 ED_{22}	—	March 1, 1992	La Silla	UESAC	·	1.8 km	MPC; JPL
35126	1992 EM_{25}	—	March 6, 1992	La Silla	UESAC	·	2.6 km	MPC; JPL
35127	1992 EQ_{26}	—	March 2, 1992	La Silla	UESAC	·	2.2 km	MPC; JPL
35128	1992 EG_{27}	—	March 2, 1992	La Silla	UESAC	·	1.6 km	MPC; JPL
35129	1992 EZ_{29}	—	March 3, 1992	La Silla	UESAC	·	2.3 km	MPC; JPL
35130	1992 LQ	—	June 3, 1992	Palomar	G. J. Leonard	EOS	9.7 km	MPC; JPL
35131	1992 PE_{2}	—	August 2, 1992	Palomar	H. E. Holt	EUN	3.3 km	MPC; JPL
35132	1992 PY_{3}	—	August 2, 1992	Palomar	H. E. Holt	·	3.0 km	MPC; JPL
35133	1992 QX	—	August 29, 1992	Palomar	E. F. Helin	·	3.0 km	MPC; JPL
35134	1992 RE	—	September 4, 1992	Siding Spring	R. H. McNaught	H	1.6 km	MPC; JPL
35135	1992 RO_{1}	—	September 1, 1992	Palomar	E. F. Helin	·	6.2 km	MPC; JPL
35136	1992 RU_{1}	—	September 2, 1992	La Silla	E. W. Elst	·	2.8 km	MPC; JPL
35137 Meudon	1992 RT_{4}	Meudon	September 2, 1992	La Silla	E. W. Elst	NYS	3.0 km	MPC; JPL
35138	1992 RV_{5}	—	September 2, 1992	La Silla	E. W. Elst	NYS	2.4 km	MPC; JPL
35139	1992 RP_{7}	—	September 2, 1992	La Silla	E. W. Elst	·	4.8 km	MPC; JPL
35140	1992 RQ_{7}	—	September 2, 1992	La Silla	E. W. Elst	·	2.8 km	MPC; JPL
35141 Tomitayoshikuni	1992 SH_{1}	Tomitayoshikuni	September 23, 1992	Kitami	K. Endate, K. Watanabe	·	3.4 km	MPC; JPL
35142	1992 ST_{7}	—	September 26, 1992	Kitt Peak	Spacewatch	MAS	1.7 km	MPC; JPL
35143 Harimoto	1992 UF_{1}	Harimoto	October 19, 1992	Kitami	M. Yanai, K. Watanabe	·	5.7 km	MPC; JPL
35144	1992 YE_{1}	—	December 18, 1992	Caussols	E. W. Elst	·	3.9 km	MPC; JPL
35145	1993 AM	—	January 13, 1993	Kushiro	S. Ueda, H. Kaneda	ADE	6.9 km	MPC; JPL
35146	1993 FC_{9}	—	March 17, 1993	La Silla	UESAC	KOR	3.7 km	MPC; JPL
35147	1993 FD_{9}	—	March 17, 1993	La Silla	UESAC	·	2.8 km	MPC; JPL
35148	1993 FX_{15}	—	March 17, 1993	La Silla	UESAC	(1298)	9.3 km	MPC; JPL
35149	1993 FG_{33}	—	March 19, 1993	La Silla	UESAC	·	4.6 km	MPC; JPL
35150	1993 FR_{41}	—	March 19, 1993	La Silla	UESAC	·	5.0 km	MPC; JPL
35151	1993 FQ_{50}	—	March 19, 1993	La Silla	UESAC	·	3.1 km	MPC; JPL
35152	1993 FG_{51}	—	March 19, 1993	La Silla	UESAC	·	7.4 km	MPC; JPL
35153	1993 FU_{52}	—	March 17, 1993	La Silla	UESAC	AGN	4.4 km	MPC; JPL
35154	1993 FF_{53}	—	March 17, 1993	La Silla	UESAC	·	4.6 km	MPC; JPL
35155	1993 FU_{58}	—	March 19, 1993	La Silla	UESAC	·	7.4 km	MPC; JPL
35156	1993 FH_{59}	—	March 19, 1993	La Silla	UESAC	THM	4.5 km	MPC; JPL
35157	1993 FQ_{73}	—	March 21, 1993	La Silla	UESAC	KOR	2.8 km	MPC; JPL
35158	1993 FL_{82}	—	March 19, 1993	La Silla	UESAC	·	4.4 km	MPC; JPL
35159	1993 LH_{1}	—	June 13, 1993	Siding Spring	R. H. McNaught	MAR	4.3 km	MPC; JPL
35160	1993 NY	—	July 12, 1993	La Silla	E. W. Elst	·	3.4 km	MPC; JPL
35161	1993 OW	—	July 16, 1993	Palomar	E. F. Helin	·	3.4 km	MPC; JPL
35162	1993 OE_{2}	—	July 20, 1993	Caussols	E. W. Elst	·	1.8 km	MPC; JPL
35163	1993 OD_{5}	—	July 20, 1993	La Silla	E. W. Elst	·	1.4 km	MPC; JPL
35164	1993 PZ_{8}	—	August 14, 1993	Caussols	E. W. Elst	·	3.4 km	MPC; JPL
35165 Québec	1993 QF_{1}	Québec	August 16, 1993	Caussols	E. W. Elst	·	11 km	MPC; JPL
35166	1993 QD_{8}	—	August 20, 1993	La Silla	E. W. Elst	·	2.4 km	MPC; JPL
35167	1993 RX_{13}	—	September 14, 1993	La Silla	H. Debehogne, E. W. Elst	·	9.6 km	MPC; JPL
35168	1993 RS_{14}	—	September 15, 1993	La Silla	E. W. Elst	·	2.1 km	MPC; JPL
35169 Araake	1993 SP_{2}	Araake	September 19, 1993	Kitami	K. Endate, K. Watanabe	·	3.7 km	MPC; JPL
35170 Mizunochisato	1993 TM	Mizunochisato	October 8, 1993	Kitami	K. Endate, K. Watanabe	V	2.6 km	MPC; JPL
35171 Maedakoji	1993 TF_{1}	Maedakoji	October 15, 1993	Kitami	K. Endate, K. Watanabe	·	4.6 km	MPC; JPL
35172 Miyaharamisao	1993 TA_{3}	Miyaharamisao	October 11, 1993	Kitami	K. Endate, K. Watanabe	·	2.8 km	MPC; JPL
35173	1993 TP_{9}	—	October 12, 1993	Kitt Peak	Spacewatch	(2076)	2.8 km	MPC; JPL
35174	1993 TV_{13}	—	October 9, 1993	La Silla	E. W. Elst	NYS	2.1 km	MPC; JPL
35175	1993 TJ_{21}	—	October 10, 1993	Palomar	H. E. Holt	TIR	10 km	MPC; JPL
35176	1993 TK_{21}	—	October 10, 1993	Palomar	H. E. Holt	V	1.6 km	MPC; JPL
35177	1993 TP_{22}	—	October 9, 1993	La Silla	E. W. Elst	·	9.1 km	MPC; JPL
35178	1993 TQ_{27}	—	October 9, 1993	La Silla	E. W. Elst	·	9.8 km	MPC; JPL
35179	1993 TK_{28}	—	October 9, 1993	La Silla	E. W. Elst	NYS	2.4 km	MPC; JPL
35180	1993 TC_{38}	—	October 9, 1993	La Silla	E. W. Elst	·	2.5 km	MPC; JPL
35181	1993 TO_{38}	—	October 9, 1993	La Silla	E. W. Elst	·	3.1 km	MPC; JPL
35182	1993 US_{1}	—	October 20, 1993	Kitt Peak	Spacewatch	·	2.0 km	MPC; JPL
35183	1993 UY_{2}	—	October 20, 1993	Siding Spring	R. H. McNaught	·	16 km	MPC; JPL
35184	1993 UW_{3}	—	October 20, 1993	La Silla	E. W. Elst	·	2.0 km	MPC; JPL
35185	1993 VS	—	November 14, 1993	Oizumi	T. Kobayashi	·	3.4 km	MPC; JPL
35186	1993 VV_{1}	—	November 11, 1993	Kushiro	S. Ueda, H. Kaneda	NYS	4.2 km	MPC; JPL
35187	1993 VW_{1}	—	November 11, 1993	Kushiro	S. Ueda, H. Kaneda	·	6.9 km	MPC; JPL
35188	1993 VP_{3}	—	November 11, 1993	Kushiro	S. Ueda, H. Kaneda	(5)	4.9 km	MPC; JPL
35189	1994 AE	—	January 2, 1994	Oizumi	T. Kobayashi	·	4.0 km	MPC; JPL
35190	1994 AW	—	January 4, 1994	Oizumi	T. Kobayashi	·	5.4 km	MPC; JPL
35191	1994 CE_{3}	—	February 10, 1994	Kitt Peak	Spacewatch	·	3.6 km	MPC; JPL
35192	1994 CG_{6}	—	February 12, 1994	Kitt Peak	Spacewatch	EUN	4.3 km	MPC; JPL
35193	1994 CG_{14}	—	February 8, 1994	La Silla	E. W. Elst	·	5.5 km	MPC; JPL
35194	1994 ET_{3}	—	March 10, 1994	Palomar	E. F. Helin	H	2.1 km	MPC; JPL
35195	1994 JD_{4}	—	May 3, 1994	Kitt Peak	Spacewatch	·	4.0 km	MPC; JPL
35196	1994 JC_{8}	—	May 11, 1994	Kitt Peak	Spacewatch	HOF	5.9 km	MPC; JPL
35197 Longmire	1994 LH	Longmire	June 7, 1994	Farra d'Isonzo	Farra d'Isonzo	·	6.6 km	MPC; JPL
35198	1994 PM_{1}	—	August 9, 1994	Siding Spring	R. H. McNaught	H	1.7 km	MPC; JPL
35199	1994 PE_{3}	—	August 10, 1994	La Silla	E. W. Elst	·	5.6 km	MPC; JPL
35200	1994 PX_{4}	—	August 10, 1994	La Silla	E. W. Elst	·	7.9 km	MPC; JPL

== 35201–35300 ==
back to top

Designation			Discovery			Properties		Ref
Permanent	Provisional	Named after	Date	Site	Discoverer(s)	Category	Diam.	Ref
35201	1994 PW_{6}	—	August 10, 1994	La Silla	E. W. Elst	THM ·	6.4 km	MPC; JPL
35202	1994 PH_{8}	—	August 10, 1994	La Silla	E. W. Elst	THM	6.7 km	MPC; JPL
35203	1994 PF_{15}	—	August 10, 1994	La Silla	E. W. Elst	EOS	4.2 km	MPC; JPL
35204	1994 PV_{15}	—	August 10, 1994	La Silla	E. W. Elst	·	7.6 km	MPC; JPL
35205	1994 PS_{17}	—	August 10, 1994	La Silla	E. W. Elst	·	3.4 km	MPC; JPL
35206	1994 PO_{27}	—	August 12, 1994	La Silla	E. W. Elst	KOR	4.1 km	MPC; JPL
35207	1994 PN_{36}	—	August 10, 1994	La Silla	E. W. Elst	EOS	4.9 km	MPC; JPL
35208	1994 PB_{38}	—	August 10, 1994	La Silla	E. W. Elst	EOS	5.2 km	MPC; JPL
35209	1994 PJ_{38}	—	August 10, 1994	La Silla	E. W. Elst	EOS	4.0 km	MPC; JPL
35210	1994 PR_{39}	—	August 10, 1994	La Silla	E. W. Elst	·	2.1 km	MPC; JPL
35211	1994 RR_{2}	—	September 2, 1994	Kitt Peak	Spacewatch	·	5.4 km	MPC; JPL
35212	1994 RP_{18}	—	September 3, 1994	La Silla	E. W. Elst	KOR	3.6 km	MPC; JPL
35213	1994 RF_{25}	—	September 12, 1994	Xinglong	SCAP	·	9.5 km	MPC; JPL
35214	1994 SC_{5}	—	September 28, 1994	Kitt Peak	Spacewatch	·	5.1 km	MPC; JPL
35215	1994 SH_{9}	—	September 28, 1994	Kitt Peak	Spacewatch	KOR	5.7 km	MPC; JPL
35216	1994 UH_{3}	—	October 26, 1994	Kitt Peak	Spacewatch	THM	7.3 km	MPC; JPL
35217	1994 VK_{1}	—	November 4, 1994	Oizumi	T. Kobayashi	·	2.4 km	MPC; JPL
35218	1994 WU_{2}	—	November 30, 1994	Oizumi	T. Kobayashi	·	2.6 km	MPC; JPL
35219	1994 WY_{2}	—	November 30, 1994	Oizumi	T. Kobayashi	·	3.6 km	MPC; JPL
35220	1994 WU_{7}	—	November 28, 1994	Kitt Peak	Spacewatch	(1298)	9.6 km	MPC; JPL
35221	1994 XK_{1}	—	December 7, 1994	Oizumi	T. Kobayashi	MAS	2.3 km	MPC; JPL
35222 Delbarrio	1994 XD_{6}	Delbarrio	December 4, 1994	Cima Ekar	M. Tombelli	V	2.6 km	MPC; JPL
35223	1995 BR	—	January 23, 1995	Oizumi	T. Kobayashi	·	2.4 km	MPC; JPL
35224	1995 BN_{1}	—	January 25, 1995	Oizumi	T. Kobayashi	·	2.2 km	MPC; JPL
35225	1995 DX_{8}	—	February 24, 1995	Kitt Peak	Spacewatch	MAS	2.0 km	MPC; JPL
35226	1995 FT_{4}	—	March 23, 1995	Kitt Peak	Spacewatch	NYS	2.1 km	MPC; JPL
35227	1995 FR_{5}	—	March 23, 1995	Kitt Peak	Spacewatch	·	2.8 km	MPC; JPL
35228	1995 FB_{14}	—	March 27, 1995	Kitt Peak	Spacewatch	·	2.6 km	MPC; JPL
35229 Benckert	1995 FY_{20}	Benckert	March 24, 1995	Tautenburg Observatory	F. Börngen	V	3.4 km	MPC; JPL
35230	1995 GW	—	April 7, 1995	Oizumi	T. Kobayashi	·	4.4 km	MPC; JPL
35231 Sugimotojunya	1995 GH_{7}	Sugimotojunya	April 4, 1995	Kitami	K. Endate, K. Watanabe	·	4.2 km	MPC; JPL
35232	1995 GS_{7}	—	April 4, 1995	Xinglong	SCAP	·	2.6 km	MPC; JPL
35233 Krčín	1995 KJ	Krčín	May 26, 1995	Kleť	J. Tichá, M. Tichý	·	2.3 km	MPC; JPL
35234	1995 NH	—	July 1, 1995	Kitt Peak	Spacewatch	EUN	3.3 km	MPC; JPL
35235	1995 OZ_{14}	—	July 25, 1995	Kitt Peak	Spacewatch	DOR	5.9 km	MPC; JPL
35236	1995 PC_{1}	—	August 2, 1995	Kitt Peak	Spacewatch	·	2.5 km	MPC; JPL
35237 Matzner	1995 QP	Matzner	August 23, 1995	Ondřejov	L. Kotková	DOR	6.6 km	MPC; JPL
35238	1995 QR_{1}	—	August 20, 1995	Xinglong	SCAP	(7744)	3.3 km	MPC; JPL
35239 Ottoseydl	1995 SH_{2}	Ottoseydl	September 25, 1995	Kleť	M. Tichý, Z. Moravec	KOR	2.6 km	MPC; JPL
35240	1995 SY_{5}	—	September 17, 1995	Kitt Peak	Spacewatch	·	3.6 km	MPC; JPL
35241	1995 SD_{41}	—	September 25, 1995	Kitt Peak	Spacewatch	KOR	2.3 km	MPC; JPL
35242	1995 SJ_{52}	—	September 29, 1995	Kitt Peak	Spacewatch	·	3.9 km	MPC; JPL
35243	1995 TZ_{1}	—	October 14, 1995	Xinglong	SCAP	·	3.9 km	MPC; JPL
35244	1995 TX_{7}	—	October 15, 1995	Kitt Peak	Spacewatch	·	3.2 km	MPC; JPL
35245	1995 UW_{12}	—	October 17, 1995	Kitt Peak	Spacewatch	·	4.7 km	MPC; JPL
35246	1995 UQ_{15}	—	October 17, 1995	Kitt Peak	Spacewatch	·	6.0 km	MPC; JPL
35247	1995 UZ_{20}	—	October 19, 1995	Kitt Peak	Spacewatch	·	4.0 km	MPC; JPL
35248	1995 UR_{53}	—	October 21, 1995	Kitt Peak	Spacewatch	·	9.3 km	MPC; JPL
35249	1995 WQ_{3}	—	November 21, 1995	Farra d'Isonzo	Farra d'Isonzo	KOR	4.3 km	MPC; JPL
35250	1995 WB_{28}	—	November 19, 1995	Kitt Peak	Spacewatch	·	4.0 km	MPC; JPL
35251	1995 YE_{5}	—	December 16, 1995	Kitt Peak	Spacewatch	KOR	2.9 km	MPC; JPL
35252	1995 YJ_{14}	—	December 20, 1995	Kitt Peak	Spacewatch	·	6.0 km	MPC; JPL
35253	1996 AB_{7}	—	January 12, 1996	Kitt Peak	Spacewatch	·	8.4 km	MPC; JPL
35254 Noriko	1996 BW_{2}	Noriko	January 26, 1996	Uto	F. Uto	TIR	5.3 km	MPC; JPL
35255	1996 BS_{8}	—	January 19, 1996	Kitt Peak	Spacewatch	·	3.3 km	MPC; JPL
35256	1996 DT_{1}	—	February 23, 1996	Višnjan Observatory	Višnjan	·	5.2 km	MPC; JPL
35257	1996 HM_{14}	—	April 17, 1996	La Silla	E. W. Elst	·	1.8 km	MPC; JPL
35258	1996 HN_{23}	—	April 20, 1996	La Silla	E. W. Elst	·	4.3 km	MPC; JPL
35259	1996 HN_{24}	—	April 20, 1996	La Silla	E. W. Elst	slow	5.6 km	MPC; JPL
35260	1996 HA_{25}	—	April 20, 1996	La Silla	E. W. Elst	·	4.5 km	MPC; JPL
35261	1996 JX_{5}	—	May 11, 1996	Kitt Peak	Spacewatch	·	2.0 km	MPC; JPL
35262	1996 NA_{2}	—	July 15, 1996	Haleakala	NEAT	·	4.9 km	MPC; JPL
35263	1996 NH_{3}	—	July 14, 1996	La Silla	E. W. Elst	·	3.3 km	MPC; JPL
35264	1996 NM_{5}	—	July 14, 1996	La Silla	E. W. Elst	V	2.4 km	MPC; JPL
35265 Takeosaitou	1996 NS_{5}	Takeosaitou	July 12, 1996	Nanyo	T. Okuni	V	2.8 km	MPC; JPL
35266	1996 PC_{4}	—	August 9, 1996	Haleakala	NEAT	·	2.3 km	MPC; JPL
35267	1996 PO_{7}	—	August 8, 1996	La Silla	E. W. Elst	·	2.6 km	MPC; JPL
35268 Panoramix	1996 QY	Panoramix	August 19, 1996	Kleť	M. Tichý	·	2.0 km	MPC; JPL
35269 Idéfix	1996 QC_{1}	Idéfix	August 21, 1996	Kleť	M. Tichý, J. Tichá	·	3.1 km	MPC; JPL
35270 Molinari	1996 RL	Molinari	September 7, 1996	Sormano	Giuliani, V., P. Chiavenna	ERI	5.0 km	MPC; JPL
35271	1996 RR_{3}	—	September 13, 1996	Haleakala	NEAT	·	2.8 km	MPC; JPL
35272	1996 RH_{10}	—	September 7, 1996	Kitt Peak	Spacewatch	L4	20 km	MPC; JPL
35273	1996 RF_{11}	—	September 8, 1996	Kitt Peak	Spacewatch	·	2.4 km	MPC; JPL
35274 Kenziarino	1996 RF_{24}	Kenziarino	September 7, 1996	Nanyo	T. Okuni	·	2.5 km	MPC; JPL
35275	1996 RB_{25}	—	September 11, 1996	Kitt Peak	Spacewatch	NYS	1.7 km	MPC; JPL
35276	1996 RS_{25}	—	September 13, 1996	Haleakala	NEAT	L4	25 km	MPC; JPL
35277	1996 RV_{27}	—	September 10, 1996	La Silla	Uppsala-DLR Trojan Survey	L4	20 km	MPC; JPL
35278	1996 SM	—	September 16, 1996	Prescott	P. G. Comba	V	1.5 km	MPC; JPL
35279	1996 SR	—	September 20, 1996	Rand	G. R. Viscome	(5)	3.0 km	MPC; JPL
35280	1996 SQ_{1}	—	September 17, 1996	Kitt Peak	Spacewatch	·	2.3 km	MPC; JPL
35281	1996 SD_{6}	—	September 18, 1996	Xinglong	SCAP	·	2.5 km	MPC; JPL
35282	1996 SC_{7}	—	September 21, 1996	Xinglong	SCAP	·	3.7 km	MPC; JPL
35283 Bradtimerson	1996 TB_{1}	Bradtimerson	October 5, 1996	Rand	G. R. Viscome	·	3.7 km	MPC; JPL
35284	1996 TM_{3}	—	October 5, 1996	King City, Ontario Observatory	Sandness, R. G.	V	2.6 km	MPC; JPL
35285	1996 TR_{5}	—	October 6, 1996	Catalina Station	C. W. Hergenrother	PHO	3.6 km	MPC; JPL
35286 Takaoakihiro	1996 TP_{9}	Takaoakihiro	October 14, 1996	Yatsuka	H. Abe	ADE · slow	8.9 km	MPC; JPL
35287	1996 TA_{18}	—	October 4, 1996	Kitt Peak	Spacewatch	·	2.6 km	MPC; JPL
35288	1996 TL_{19}	—	October 4, 1996	Kitt Peak	Spacewatch	(5)	3.1 km	MPC; JPL
35289	1996 TL_{40}	—	October 8, 1996	La Silla	E. W. Elst	(5)	5.3 km	MPC; JPL
35290	1996 TE_{42}	—	October 8, 1996	La Silla	E. W. Elst	·	3.2 km	MPC; JPL
35291	1996 TN_{46}	—	October 10, 1996	Kitt Peak	Spacewatch	·	5.9 km	MPC; JPL
35292	1996 TE_{47}	—	October 11, 1996	Kitt Peak	Spacewatch	·	3.5 km	MPC; JPL
35293	1996 TC_{54}	—	October 5, 1996	La Silla	E. W. Elst	·	2.5 km	MPC; JPL
35294	1996 UG_{4}	—	October 29, 1996	Xinglong	SCAP	·	4.2 km	MPC; JPL
35295 Omo	1996 VM	Omo	November 1, 1996	Colleverde	V. S. Casulli	EUN	4.3 km	MPC; JPL
35296	1996 VY_{1}	—	November 1, 1996	Xinglong	SCAP	·	6.9 km	MPC; JPL
35297	1996 VS_{3}	—	November 2, 1996	Xinglong	SCAP	NYS	2.1 km	MPC; JPL
35298 Azumachiharu	1996 VH_{5}	Azumachiharu	November 3, 1996	Kitami	K. Endate, K. Watanabe	·	4.5 km	MPC; JPL
35299 Kishisayoko	1996 VK_{8}	Kishisayoko	November 7, 1996	Kitami	K. Endate, K. Watanabe	·	5.7 km	MPC; JPL
35300	1996 VQ_{18}	—	November 6, 1996	Kitt Peak	Spacewatch	·	2.4 km	MPC; JPL

== 35301–35400 ==
back to top

Designation			Discovery			Properties		Ref
Permanent	Provisional	Named after	Date	Site	Discoverer(s)	Category	Diam.	Ref
35301	1996 XE	—	December 1, 1996	Oohira	T. Urata	·	5.4 km	MPC; JPL
35302	1996 XD_{6}	—	December 7, 1996	Oizumi	T. Kobayashi	URS · slow	9.5 km	MPC; JPL
35303	1996 XR_{6}	—	December 1, 1996	Kitt Peak	Spacewatch	·	3.5 km	MPC; JPL
35304	1996 XY_{11}	—	December 4, 1996	Kitt Peak	Spacewatch	KOR	2.8 km	MPC; JPL
35305	1996 XB_{12}	—	December 4, 1996	Kitt Peak	Spacewatch	KOR	2.9 km	MPC; JPL
35306	1996 XQ_{17}	—	December 5, 1996	Kitt Peak	Spacewatch	·	6.7 km	MPC; JPL
35307	1996 XG_{20}	—	December 4, 1996	Kitt Peak	Spacewatch	·	5.0 km	MPC; JPL
35308	1996 XJ_{20}	—	December 4, 1996	Kitt Peak	Spacewatch	·	4.7 km	MPC; JPL
35309	1996 YF_{3}	—	December 24, 1996	Xinglong	SCAP	MAR	4.1 km	MPC; JPL
35310	1997 AX_{1}	—	January 3, 1997	Oizumi	T. Kobayashi	fast	15 km	MPC; JPL
35311	1997 AE_{2}	—	January 3, 1997	Oizumi	T. Kobayashi	EOS	6.5 km	MPC; JPL
35312	1997 AX_{2}	—	January 4, 1997	Oizumi	T. Kobayashi	DOR	5.2 km	MPC; JPL
35313 Hangtianyuan	1997 AC_{6}	Hangtianyuan	January 2, 1997	Xinglong	SCAP	KOR	3.9 km	MPC; JPL
35314	1997 AW_{8}	—	January 2, 1997	Kitt Peak	Spacewatch	·	12 km	MPC; JPL
35315	1997 AX_{9}	—	January 3, 1997	Kitt Peak	Spacewatch	KOR	3.2 km	MPC; JPL
35316 Monella	1997 AW_{13}	Monella	January 11, 1997	Sormano	P. Sicoli, M. Cavagna	·	4.2 km	MPC; JPL
35317	1997 AQ_{23}	—	January 14, 1997	Xinglong	SCAP	BRA	3.7 km	MPC; JPL
35318	1997 BD_{1}	—	January 25, 1997	Xinglong	SCAP	·	5.1 km	MPC; JPL
35319	1997 BU_{4}	—	January 31, 1997	Kitt Peak	Spacewatch	·	4.5 km	MPC; JPL
35320	1997 BR_{8}	—	January 30, 1997	Črni Vrh	Mikuž, H.	EUN	3.6 km	MPC; JPL
35321	1997 CU_{9}	—	February 1, 1997	Kitt Peak	Spacewatch	·	8.3 km	MPC; JPL
35322	1997 CX_{16}	—	February 6, 1997	Chichibu	N. Satō	EOS ·	8.1 km	MPC; JPL
35323	1997 CD_{26}	—	February 13, 1997	Oohira	T. Urata	EOS	4.1 km	MPC; JPL
35324 Orlandi	1997 ET_{7}	Orlandi	March 7, 1997	Bologna	San Vittore	·	12 km	MPC; JPL
35325 Claudiaguarnieri	1997 EU_{7}	Claudiaguarnieri	March 7, 1997	Bologna	San Vittore	·	5.8 km	MPC; JPL
35326 Lucastrabla	1997 EV_{7}	Lucastrabla	March 7, 1997	Bologna	San Vittore	THM	5.6 km	MPC; JPL
35327	1997 EP_{13}	—	March 3, 1997	Kitt Peak	Spacewatch	·	5.7 km	MPC; JPL
35328	1997 EH_{15}	—	March 4, 1997	Kitt Peak	Spacewatch	·	7.9 km	MPC; JPL
35329	1997 EG_{34}	—	March 4, 1997	Socorro	LINEAR	·	5.6 km	MPC; JPL
35330	1997 EN_{35}	—	March 4, 1997	Socorro	LINEAR	·	5.7 km	MPC; JPL
35331	1997 EO_{47}	—	March 12, 1997	La Silla	E. W. Elst	·	9.0 km	MPC; JPL
35332	1997 EY_{52}	—	March 8, 1997	La Silla	E. W. Elst	·	5.2 km	MPC; JPL
35333	1997 EW_{55}	—	March 10, 1997	La Silla	E. W. Elst	·	6.6 km	MPC; JPL
35334 Yarkovsky	1997 FO_{1}	Yarkovsky	March 31, 1997	Sormano	P. Sicoli, F. Manca	·	3.9 km	MPC; JPL
35335	1997 FU_{1}	—	March 30, 1997	Kitt Peak	Spacewatch	·	11 km	MPC; JPL
35336	1997 FO_{2}	—	March 31, 1997	Socorro	LINEAR	·	16 km	MPC; JPL
35337	1997 FB_{3}	—	March 31, 1997	Socorro	LINEAR	EOS	5.0 km	MPC; JPL
35338	1997 GD_{7}	—	April 2, 1997	Socorro	LINEAR	·	7.9 km	MPC; JPL
35339	1997 GS_{16}	—	April 3, 1997	Socorro	LINEAR	KOR	6.2 km	MPC; JPL
35340	1997 GV_{18}	—	April 3, 1997	Socorro	LINEAR	HYG	9.7 km	MPC; JPL
35341	1997 GT_{22}	—	April 6, 1997	Socorro	LINEAR	EOS	7.7 km	MPC; JPL
35342	1997 GZ_{24}	—	April 7, 1997	Goodricke-Pigott	Chamberlin, M. T.	·	8.8 km	MPC; JPL
35343 Tomoda	1997 GV_{36}	Tomoda	April 3, 1997	Kitami	K. Endate, K. Watanabe	THM	6.9 km	MPC; JPL
35344	1997 HX_{6}	—	April 30, 1997	Socorro	LINEAR	·	12 km	MPC; JPL
35345	1997 HY_{6}	—	April 30, 1997	Socorro	LINEAR	EOS	6.8 km	MPC; JPL
35346 Ivanoferri	1997 JX	Ivanoferri	May 1, 1997	Bologna	San Vittore	VER	7.2 km	MPC; JPL
35347 Tallinn	1997 JN_{12}	Tallinn	May 3, 1997	La Silla	E. W. Elst	EOS	10 km	MPC; JPL
35348	1997 JO_{18}	—	May 8, 1997	Burlington	Handley, T.	TIR	10 km	MPC; JPL
35349	1997 LY_{12}	—	June 7, 1997	La Silla	E. W. Elst	HYG	8.3 km	MPC; JPL
35350 Lespaul	1997 LP_{14}	Lespaul	June 8, 1997	La Silla	E. W. Elst	HYG	9.3 km	MPC; JPL
35351	1997 MP_{3}	—	June 28, 1997	Socorro	LINEAR	·	1.7 km	MPC; JPL
35352 Texas	1997 PD_{2}	Texas	August 7, 1997	Needville	Dillon, W. G., Pepper, R.	NYS	1.8 km	MPC; JPL
35353 Naďapravcová	1997 RW_{9}	Naďapravcová	September 8, 1997	Ondřejov	P. Pravec	·	3.0 km	MPC; JPL
35354	1997 SP_{1}	—	September 22, 1997	Farra d'Isonzo	Farra d'Isonzo	·	4.5 km	MPC; JPL
35355 Honzík	1997 SB_{2}	Honzík	September 23, 1997	Ondřejov	P. Pravec	·	2.1 km	MPC; JPL
35356 Vondrák	1997 SL_{3}	Vondrák	September 25, 1997	Ondřejov	P. Pravec, L. Kotková	·	1.7 km	MPC; JPL
35357 Haraldlesch	1997 SX_{9}	Haraldlesch	September 28, 1997	Starkenburg Observatory	Starkenburg	·	1.9 km	MPC; JPL
35358 Lorifini	1997 SL_{17}	Lorifini	September 27, 1997	San Marcello	L. Tesi, M. Tombelli	·	5.9 km	MPC; JPL
35359	1997 SO_{33}	—	September 26, 1997	Xinglong	SCAP	·	2.7 km	MPC; JPL
35360	1997 TY_{11}	—	October 7, 1997	Xinglong	SCAP	·	3.1 km	MPC; JPL
35361	1997 TH_{26}	—	October 11, 1997	Xinglong	SCAP	·	1.6 km	MPC; JPL
35362	1997 TZ_{26}	—	October 7, 1997	Xinglong	SCAP	·	3.7 km	MPC; JPL
35363	1997 TV_{28}	—	October 6, 1997	La Silla	Uppsala-DLR Trojan Survey	L4	19 km	MPC; JPL
35364 Donaldpray	1997 UT	Donaldpray	October 21, 1997	Ondřejov	P. Pravec	·	2.6 km	MPC; JPL
35365 Cooney	1997 UU	Cooney	October 21, 1997	Ondřejov	P. Pravec	·	1.7 km	MPC; JPL
35366 Kaifeng	1997 UP_{4}	Kaifeng	October 18, 1997	Xinglong	SCAP	·	1.8 km	MPC; JPL
35367 Dobrédílo	1997 UW_{7}	Dobrédílo	October 28, 1997	Ondřejov	L. Kotková	·	2.3 km	MPC; JPL
35368	1997 UB_{8}	—	October 28, 1997	Haleakala	NEAT	·	2.4 km	MPC; JPL
35369	1997 UJ_{11}	—	October 29, 1997	Haleakala	NEAT	PHO · slow	12 km	MPC; JPL
35370 Daisakyu	1997 UF_{21}	Daisakyu	October 29, 1997	Saji	Saji	·	2.9 km	MPC; JPL
35371 Yokonozaki	1997 UZ_{21}	Yokonozaki	October 25, 1997	Nyukasa	M. Hirasawa, S. Suzuki	·	3.3 km	MPC; JPL
35372	1997 UN_{24}	—	October 28, 1997	Xinglong	SCAP	·	3.1 km	MPC; JPL
35373	1997 UT_{25}	—	October 25, 1997	La Silla	Uppsala-DLR Trojan Survey	NYS	2.5 km	MPC; JPL
35374	1997 VK	—	November 1, 1997	Prescott	P. G. Comba	·	3.2 km	MPC; JPL
35375	1997 VP_{1}	—	November 1, 1997	Kushiro	S. Ueda, H. Kaneda	·	5.1 km	MPC; JPL
35376	1997 VJ_{5}	—	November 8, 1997	Oizumi	T. Kobayashi	·	2.7 km	MPC; JPL
35377	1997 WN_{2}	—	November 23, 1997	Oizumi	T. Kobayashi	NYS	2.6 km	MPC; JPL
35378	1997 WN_{12}	—	November 23, 1997	Kitt Peak	Spacewatch	·	2.3 km	MPC; JPL
35379	1997 WS_{20}	—	November 25, 1997	Kitt Peak	Spacewatch	·	1.9 km	MPC; JPL
35380	1997 WJ_{21}	—	November 30, 1997	Oizumi	T. Kobayashi	·	2.6 km	MPC; JPL
35381	1997 WH_{31}	—	November 29, 1997	Socorro	LINEAR	·	2.1 km	MPC; JPL
35382	1997 WJ_{36}	—	November 29, 1997	Socorro	LINEAR	·	2.4 km	MPC; JPL
35383	1997 WU_{36}	—	November 29, 1997	Socorro	LINEAR	·	2.6 km	MPC; JPL
35384	1997 WK_{37}	—	November 29, 1997	Socorro	LINEAR	NYS	2.9 km	MPC; JPL
35385	1997 WL_{37}	—	November 29, 1997	Socorro	LINEAR	·	2.4 km	MPC; JPL
35386	1997 WM_{43}	—	November 29, 1997	Socorro	LINEAR	·	3.4 km	MPC; JPL
35387	1997 WY_{44}	—	November 29, 1997	Socorro	LINEAR	NYS	2.7 km	MPC; JPL
35388	1997 WY_{56}	—	November 25, 1997	Kitt Peak	Spacewatch	·	2.8 km	MPC; JPL
35389	1997 XO	—	December 3, 1997	Oizumi	T. Kobayashi	fast?	4.2 km	MPC; JPL
35390	1997 XW	—	December 3, 1997	Oizumi	T. Kobayashi	·	2.7 km	MPC; JPL
35391 Uzan	1997 XN_{3}	Uzan	December 3, 1997	Caussols	ODAS	·	5.1 km	MPC; JPL
35392	1997 XD_{5}	—	December 6, 1997	Caussols	ODAS	·	2.6 km	MPC; JPL
35393	1997 XJ_{5}	—	December 2, 1997	Nachi-Katsuura	Y. Shimizu, T. Urata	(2076)	2.8 km	MPC; JPL
35394 Countbasie	1997 XD_{9}	Countbasie	December 7, 1997	Caussols	ODAS	·	6.3 km	MPC; JPL
35395	1997 XM_{10}	—	December 4, 1997	Gekko	T. Kagawa, T. Urata	NYS	3.7 km	MPC; JPL
35396	1997 XF_{11}	—	December 6, 1997	Kitt Peak	Spacewatch	APO +1km · PHA	700 m	MPC; JPL
35397	1997 YJ	—	December 18, 1997	Oizumi	T. Kobayashi	·	2.6 km	MPC; JPL
35398	1997 YR	—	December 20, 1997	Oizumi	T. Kobayashi	·	5.4 km	MPC; JPL
35399	1997 YQ_{1}	—	December 20, 1997	Xinglong	SCAP	·	2.2 km	MPC; JPL
35400	1997 YU_{2}	—	December 21, 1997	Chichibu	N. Satō	NYS	3.7 km	MPC; JPL

== 35401–35500 ==
back to top

Designation			Discovery			Properties		Ref
Permanent	Provisional	Named after	Date	Site	Discoverer(s)	Category	Diam.	Ref
35401	1997 YW_{2}	—	December 21, 1997	Chichibu	N. Satō	·	4.0 km	MPC; JPL
35402	1997 YK_{3}	—	December 17, 1997	Xinglong	SCAP	·	3.1 km	MPC; JPL
35403 Latimer	1997 YW_{4}	Latimer	December 22, 1997	Needville	C. Gustava, Rivich, K.	V	1.9 km	MPC; JPL
35404	1997 YV_{5}	—	December 25, 1997	Oizumi	T. Kobayashi	·	5.4 km	MPC; JPL
35405	1997 YU_{7}	—	December 21, 1997	Kitt Peak	Spacewatch	·	3.2 km	MPC; JPL
35406	1997 YH_{8}	—	December 28, 1997	Haleakala	NEAT	·	5.0 km	MPC; JPL
35407	1997 YF_{11}	—	December 28, 1997	Haleakala	NEAT	·	4.4 km	MPC; JPL
35408	1997 YS_{13}	—	December 31, 1997	Oizumi	T. Kobayashi	MAS	2.4 km	MPC; JPL
35409	1997 YT_{13}	—	December 31, 1997	Oizumi	T. Kobayashi	·	4.2 km	MPC; JPL
35410	1997 YC_{15}	—	December 28, 1997	Kitt Peak	Spacewatch	·	3.2 km	MPC; JPL
35411	1997 YX_{16}	—	December 29, 1997	Xinglong	SCAP	·	2.5 km	MPC; JPL
35412	1997 YN_{17}	—	December 31, 1997	Kitt Peak	Spacewatch	MAS	2.0 km	MPC; JPL
35413	1998 AS	—	January 5, 1998	Oizumi	T. Kobayashi	MAS	2.1 km	MPC; JPL
35414	1998 AC_{3}	—	January 3, 1998	Xinglong	SCAP	V	1.6 km	MPC; JPL
35415	1998 AD_{3}	—	January 3, 1998	Xinglong	SCAP	·	4.1 km	MPC; JPL
35416	1998 AC_{4}	—	January 2, 1998	Kitt Peak	Spacewatch	NYS	4.3 km	MPC; JPL
35417	1998 AT_{4}	—	January 6, 1998	Kitt Peak	Spacewatch	·	3.5 km	MPC; JPL
35418	1998 AP_{5}	—	January 8, 1998	Caussols	ODAS	MAR	3.8 km	MPC; JPL
35419 Beckysmethurst	1998 AC_{6}	Beckysmethurst	January 8, 1998	Caussols	ODAS	·	2.2 km	MPC; JPL
35420 Lallemand	1998 AG_{6}	Lallemand	January 8, 1998	Caussols	ODAS	·	6.6 km	MPC; JPL
35421	1998 AO_{6}	—	January 4, 1998	Xinglong	SCAP	EUN	3.5 km	MPC; JPL
35422	1998 AF_{7}	—	January 5, 1998	Xinglong	SCAP	V	2.4 km	MPC; JPL
35423	1998 AL_{7}	—	January 6, 1998	Oizumi	T. Kobayashi	NYS	3.2 km	MPC; JPL
35424	1998 BK	—	January 18, 1998	Oizumi	T. Kobayashi	ERI	5.5 km	MPC; JPL
35425	1998 BY	—	January 19, 1998	Oizumi	T. Kobayashi	·	2.9 km	MPC; JPL
35426	1998 BN_{1}	—	January 19, 1998	Oizumi	T. Kobayashi	·	2.3 km	MPC; JPL
35427 Chelseawang	1998 BJ_{2}	Chelseawang	January 20, 1998	Socorro	LINEAR	NYS ·	3.3 km	MPC; JPL
35428	1998 BS_{2}	—	January 19, 1998	Nachi-Katsuura	Y. Shimizu, T. Urata	·	4.2 km	MPC; JPL
35429 Bochartdesaron	1998 BW_{4}	Bochartdesaron	January 18, 1998	Caussols	ODAS	·	3.2 km	MPC; JPL
35430	1998 BT_{6}	—	January 24, 1998	Oizumi	T. Kobayashi	·	3.5 km	MPC; JPL
35431	1998 BY_{6}	—	January 24, 1998	Oizumi	T. Kobayashi	·	5.9 km	MPC; JPL
35432	1998 BG_{9}	—	January 24, 1998	Haleakala	NEAT	AMO	470 m	MPC; JPL
35433	1998 BP_{9}	—	January 22, 1998	Kitt Peak	Spacewatch	·	2.6 km	MPC; JPL
35434	1998 BF_{13}	—	January 24, 1998	Socorro	LINEAR	·	3.4 km	MPC; JPL
35435 Erikayang	1998 BL_{13}	Erikayang	January 24, 1998	Socorro	LINEAR	·	3.1 km	MPC; JPL
35436	1998 BU_{15}	—	January 24, 1998	Haleakala	NEAT	·	9.5 km	MPC; JPL
35437	1998 BN_{19}	—	January 18, 1998	Kitt Peak	Spacewatch	·	2.4 km	MPC; JPL
35438	1998 BZ_{22}	—	January 23, 1998	Kitt Peak	Spacewatch	·	3.5 km	MPC; JPL
35439	1998 BK_{25}	—	January 28, 1998	Oizumi	T. Kobayashi	V	3.2 km	MPC; JPL
35440	1998 BG_{30}	—	January 29, 1998	Prescott	P. G. Comba	·	3.2 km	MPC; JPL
35441 Kyoko	1998 BH_{33}	Kyoko	January 31, 1998	Mishima	M. Akiyama	EUN	3.7 km	MPC; JPL
35442	1998 BR_{33}	—	January 31, 1998	Oizumi	T. Kobayashi	·	4.6 km	MPC; JPL
35443	1998 BG_{42}	—	January 20, 1998	Xinglong	SCAP	·	3.6 km	MPC; JPL
35444 Giuliamarconcini	1998 BU_{43}	Giuliamarconcini	January 25, 1998	Cima Ekar	U. Munari, M. Tombelli	·	3.6 km	MPC; JPL
35445	1998 CY	—	February 5, 1998	Kleť	M. Tichý, Z. Moravec	·	2.2 km	MPC; JPL
35446 Stáňa	1998 CK_{1}	Stáňa	February 6, 1998	Kleť	J. Tichá, M. Tichý	·	2.7 km	MPC; JPL
35447	1998 CW_{2}	—	February 6, 1998	La Silla	E. W. Elst	·	4.0 km	MPC; JPL
35448	1998 CX_{2}	—	February 6, 1998	La Silla	E. W. Elst	V	2.6 km	MPC; JPL
35449	1998 CR_{3}	—	February 6, 1998	La Silla	E. W. Elst	THM	7.2 km	MPC; JPL
35450	1998 CV_{4}	—	February 6, 1998	La Silla	E. W. Elst	RAF	4.3 km	MPC; JPL
35451	1998 CW_{4}	—	February 6, 1998	La Silla	E. W. Elst	EUN	3.9 km	MPC; JPL
35452	1998 DF_{10}	—	February 22, 1998	Haleakala	NEAT	·	4.0 km	MPC; JPL
35453	1998 DE_{13}	—	February 22, 1998	Haleakala	NEAT	DOR	5.4 km	MPC; JPL
35454	1998 DE_{14}	—	February 27, 1998	Caussols	ODAS	·	12 km	MPC; JPL
35455	1998 DN_{14}	—	February 22, 1998	Haleakala	NEAT	·	2.8 km	MPC; JPL
35456	1998 DF_{15}	—	February 22, 1998	Haleakala	NEAT	·	7.0 km	MPC; JPL
35457	1998 DN_{15}	—	February 22, 1998	Haleakala	NEAT	·	3.7 km	MPC; JPL
35458	1998 DU_{15}	—	February 23, 1998	Haleakala	NEAT	MAR	2.8 km	MPC; JPL
35459 Klaurieger	1998 DG_{20}	Klaurieger	February 27, 1998	Ondřejov	L. Kotková	·	5.2 km	MPC; JPL
35460	1998 DU_{20}	—	February 26, 1998	Xinglong	SCAP	·	3.6 km	MPC; JPL
35461 Mazzucato	1998 DM_{23}	Mazzucato	February 26, 1998	San Marcello	L. Tesi, A. Boattini	V	1.5 km	MPC; JPL
35462 Maramkaire	1998 DW_{23}	Maramkaire	February 27, 1998	Caussols	ODAS	·	4.3 km	MPC; JPL
35463	1998 DJ_{32}	—	February 22, 1998	Xinglong	SCAP	·	5.5 km	MPC; JPL
35464 Elisaconsigli	1998 DC_{33}	Elisaconsigli	February 27, 1998	Cima Ekar	G. Forti, M. Tombelli	·	6.6 km	MPC; JPL
35465 Emilianoricci	1998 DF_{33}	Emilianoricci	February 27, 1998	Cima Ekar	U. Munari, M. Tombelli	V	3.2 km	MPC; JPL
35466	1998 DO_{34}	—	February 27, 1998	La Silla	E. W. Elst	·	2.0 km	MPC; JPL
35467	1998 ED	—	March 1, 1998	Oizumi	T. Kobayashi	EUN	4.1 km	MPC; JPL
35468	1998 EW_{2}	—	March 2, 1998	Caussols	ODAS	·	3.9 km	MPC; JPL
35469	1998 ED_{3}	—	March 2, 1998	Prescott	P. G. Comba	·	3.1 km	MPC; JPL
35470	1998 EC_{8}	—	March 2, 1998	Xinglong	SCAP	·	3.9 km	MPC; JPL
35471	1998 ED_{8}	—	March 2, 1998	Xinglong	SCAP	·	3.1 km	MPC; JPL
35472	1998 EJ_{8}	—	March 2, 1998	Xinglong	SCAP	(5)	2.8 km	MPC; JPL
35473	1998 EZ_{8}	—	March 9, 1998	Uccle	T. Pauwels	·	4.0 km	MPC; JPL
35474	1998 EA_{9}	—	March 9, 1998	Uccle	T. Pauwels	·	3.4 km	MPC; JPL
35475	1998 EP_{9}	—	March 6, 1998	Gekko	T. Kagawa	NYS	2.3 km	MPC; JPL
35476	1998 EN_{10}	—	March 1, 1998	La Silla	E. W. Elst	·	2.9 km	MPC; JPL
35477	1998 ER_{10}	—	March 1, 1998	La Silla	E. W. Elst	·	5.2 km	MPC; JPL
35478	1998 EG_{11}	—	March 1, 1998	La Silla	E. W. Elst	·	3.7 km	MPC; JPL
35479	1998 FT_{4}	—	March 23, 1998	Kitt Peak	Spacewatch	·	5.0 km	MPC; JPL
35480	1998 FN_{5}	—	March 24, 1998	Woomera	F. B. Zoltowski	EUN	3.9 km	MPC; JPL
35481	1998 FA_{8}	—	March 20, 1998	Kitt Peak	Spacewatch	·	4.7 km	MPC; JPL
35482	1998 FJ_{11}	—	March 22, 1998	Oizumi	T. Kobayashi	·	3.0 km	MPC; JPL
35483	1998 FQ_{12}	—	March 20, 1998	Xinglong	SCAP	·	3.5 km	MPC; JPL
35484	1998 FC_{14}	—	March 25, 1998	Haleakala	NEAT	·	3.0 km	MPC; JPL
35485	1998 FZ_{14}	—	March 24, 1998	Woomera	F. B. Zoltowski	·	6.1 km	MPC; JPL
35486	1998 FH_{15}	—	March 27, 1998	Farra d'Isonzo	Farra d'Isonzo	·	5.3 km	MPC; JPL
35487	1998 FK_{16}	—	March 20, 1998	Socorro	LINEAR	EUN	3.7 km	MPC; JPL
35488	1998 FJ_{21}	—	March 20, 1998	Socorro	LINEAR	·	3.6 km	MPC; JPL
35489	1998 FE_{22}	—	March 20, 1998	Socorro	LINEAR	·	4.4 km	MPC; JPL
35490	1998 FD_{27}	—	March 20, 1998	Socorro	LINEAR	MAR	3.0 km	MPC; JPL
35491	1998 FQ_{27}	—	March 20, 1998	Socorro	LINEAR	·	3.0 km	MPC; JPL
35492	1998 FA_{29}	—	March 20, 1998	Socorro	LINEAR	·	2.6 km	MPC; JPL
35493	1998 FG_{29}	—	March 20, 1998	Socorro	LINEAR	·	5.0 km	MPC; JPL
35494	1998 FZ_{31}	—	March 20, 1998	Socorro	LINEAR	·	2.9 km	MPC; JPL
35495	1998 FO_{32}	—	March 20, 1998	Socorro	LINEAR	·	4.2 km	MPC; JPL
35496	1998 FC_{33}	—	March 20, 1998	Socorro	LINEAR	HNS	5.5 km	MPC; JPL
35497	1998 FT_{33}	—	March 20, 1998	Socorro	LINEAR	·	3.3 km	MPC; JPL
35498	1998 FC_{35}	—	March 20, 1998	Socorro	LINEAR	·	8.5 km	MPC; JPL
35499	1998 FO_{35}	—	March 20, 1998	Socorro	LINEAR	·	11 km	MPC; JPL
35500	1998 FP_{39}	—	March 20, 1998	Socorro	LINEAR	·	4.2 km	MPC; JPL

== 35501–35600 ==
back to top

Designation			Discovery			Properties		Ref
Permanent	Provisional	Named after	Date	Site	Discoverer(s)	Category	Diam.	Ref
35501	1998 FM_{41}	—	March 20, 1998	Socorro	LINEAR	·	2.6 km	MPC; JPL
35502	1998 FP_{41}	—	March 20, 1998	Socorro	LINEAR	·	4.1 km	MPC; JPL
35503	1998 FT_{42}	—	March 20, 1998	Socorro	LINEAR	EOS	6.5 km	MPC; JPL
35504	1998 FF_{43}	—	March 20, 1998	Socorro	LINEAR	EUN	5.5 km	MPC; JPL
35505	1998 FS_{43}	—	March 20, 1998	Socorro	LINEAR	(5)	3.3 km	MPC; JPL
35506	1998 FU_{43}	—	March 20, 1998	Socorro	LINEAR	·	4.2 km	MPC; JPL
35507	1998 FY_{43}	—	March 20, 1998	Socorro	LINEAR	·	4.9 km	MPC; JPL
35508	1998 FC_{44}	—	March 20, 1998	Socorro	LINEAR	·	5.8 km	MPC; JPL
35509	1998 FK_{44}	—	March 20, 1998	Socorro	LINEAR	·	8.6 km	MPC; JPL
35510	1998 FF_{47}	—	March 20, 1998	Socorro	LINEAR	·	6.8 km	MPC; JPL
35511	1998 FY_{48}	—	March 20, 1998	Socorro	LINEAR	AGN	4.0 km	MPC; JPL
35512	1998 FH_{53}	—	March 20, 1998	Socorro	LINEAR	MRX	2.4 km	MPC; JPL
35513	1998 FL_{53}	—	March 20, 1998	Socorro	LINEAR	KOR	3.3 km	MPC; JPL
35514	1998 FZ_{56}	—	March 20, 1998	Socorro	LINEAR	TEL	4.4 km	MPC; JPL
35515	1998 FK_{57}	—	March 20, 1998	Socorro	LINEAR	·	2.5 km	MPC; JPL
35516	1998 FU_{57}	—	March 20, 1998	Socorro	LINEAR	GEF	3.5 km	MPC; JPL
35517	1998 FV_{58}	—	March 20, 1998	Socorro	LINEAR	EOS	7.7 km	MPC; JPL
35518	1998 FU_{59}	—	March 20, 1998	Socorro	LINEAR	·	4.6 km	MPC; JPL
35519	1998 FJ_{60}	—	March 20, 1998	Socorro	LINEAR	·	6.2 km	MPC; JPL
35520	1998 FX_{60}	—	March 20, 1998	Socorro	LINEAR	AGN	3.5 km	MPC; JPL
35521	1998 FX_{61}	—	March 20, 1998	Socorro	LINEAR	·	5.2 km	MPC; JPL
35522	1998 FY_{62}	—	March 20, 1998	Socorro	LINEAR	·	5.2 km	MPC; JPL
35523	1998 FQ_{63}	—	March 20, 1998	Socorro	LINEAR	·	7.3 km	MPC; JPL
35524	1998 FK_{64}	—	March 20, 1998	Socorro	LINEAR	GEF	3.6 km	MPC; JPL
35525	1998 FV_{64}	—	March 20, 1998	Socorro	LINEAR	KOR	3.5 km	MPC; JPL
35526	1998 FX_{67}	—	March 20, 1998	Socorro	LINEAR	·	7.3 km	MPC; JPL
35527	1998 FG_{68}	—	March 20, 1998	Socorro	LINEAR	·	9.0 km	MPC; JPL
35528	1998 FC_{69}	—	March 20, 1998	Socorro	LINEAR	·	3.1 km	MPC; JPL
35529	1998 FU_{69}	—	March 20, 1998	Socorro	LINEAR	DOR	6.4 km	MPC; JPL
35530	1998 FE_{70}	—	March 20, 1998	Socorro	LINEAR	MAR	3.6 km	MPC; JPL
35531	1998 FQ_{70}	—	March 20, 1998	Socorro	LINEAR	·	6.5 km	MPC; JPL
35532	1998 FV_{71}	—	March 20, 1998	Socorro	LINEAR	slow	4.0 km	MPC; JPL
35533	1998 FO_{72}	—	March 20, 1998	Socorro	LINEAR	·	5.9 km	MPC; JPL
35534 Clementfeller	1998 FW_{73}	Clementfeller	March 20, 1998	Anderson Mesa	LONEOS	EUP	17 km	MPC; JPL
35535	1998 FS_{77}	—	March 24, 1998	Socorro	LINEAR	·	4.4 km	MPC; JPL
35536	1998 FG_{78}	—	March 24, 1998	Socorro	LINEAR	·	2.5 km	MPC; JPL
35537	1998 FC_{79}	—	March 24, 1998	Socorro	LINEAR	·	6.1 km	MPC; JPL
35538	1998 FH_{80}	—	March 24, 1998	Socorro	LINEAR	·	6.4 km	MPC; JPL
35539	1998 FJ_{91}	—	March 24, 1998	Socorro	LINEAR	·	5.9 km	MPC; JPL
35540	1998 FE_{94}	—	March 24, 1998	Socorro	LINEAR	·	4.8 km	MPC; JPL
35541	1998 FS_{95}	—	March 31, 1998	Socorro	LINEAR	·	2.9 km	MPC; JPL
35542	1998 FS_{99}	—	March 31, 1998	Socorro	LINEAR	EUN	7.1 km	MPC; JPL
35543	1998 FU_{99}	—	March 31, 1998	Socorro	LINEAR	·	4.9 km	MPC; JPL
35544	1998 FT_{102}	—	March 31, 1998	Socorro	LINEAR	MAR	3.6 km	MPC; JPL
35545	1998 FQ_{103}	—	March 31, 1998	Socorro	LINEAR	·	2.9 km	MPC; JPL
35546	1998 FA_{105}	—	March 31, 1998	Socorro	LINEAR	·	3.2 km	MPC; JPL
35547	1998 FV_{106}	—	March 31, 1998	Socorro	LINEAR	·	3.6 km	MPC; JPL
35548	1998 FL_{107}	—	March 31, 1998	Socorro	LINEAR	BRA	5.0 km	MPC; JPL
35549	1998 FT_{108}	—	March 31, 1998	Socorro	LINEAR	·	4.3 km	MPC; JPL
35550	1998 FD_{109}	—	March 31, 1998	Socorro	LINEAR	EOS	4.6 km	MPC; JPL
35551	1998 FA_{114}	—	March 31, 1998	Socorro	LINEAR	·	5.3 km	MPC; JPL
35552	1998 FE_{115}	—	March 31, 1998	Socorro	LINEAR	ADE	13 km	MPC; JPL
35553	1998 FK_{116}	—	March 31, 1998	Socorro	LINEAR	·	5.5 km	MPC; JPL
35554	1998 FL_{118}	—	March 31, 1998	Socorro	LINEAR	·	6.7 km	MPC; JPL
35555	1998 FC_{120}	—	March 20, 1998	Socorro	LINEAR	KOR	5.2 km	MPC; JPL
35556	1998 FC_{122}	—	March 20, 1998	Socorro	LINEAR	·	9.2 km	MPC; JPL
35557	1998 FO_{122}	—	March 20, 1998	Socorro	LINEAR	HYG	9.7 km	MPC; JPL
35558	1998 FT_{122}	—	March 20, 1998	Socorro	LINEAR	EUN	6.4 km	MPC; JPL
35559	1998 FO_{127}	—	March 24, 1998	Socorro	LINEAR	·	3.5 km	MPC; JPL
35560	1998 FU_{130}	—	March 22, 1998	Socorro	LINEAR	·	3.0 km	MPC; JPL
35561	1998 FZ_{132}	—	March 20, 1998	Socorro	LINEAR	EUN	3.4 km	MPC; JPL
35562	1998 GL_{1}	—	April 5, 1998	Woomera	F. B. Zoltowski	·	5.0 km	MPC; JPL
35563	1998 GK_{3}	—	April 2, 1998	Socorro	LINEAR	·	3.2 km	MPC; JPL
35564	1998 GY_{5}	—	April 2, 1998	Socorro	LINEAR	EUN	3.3 km	MPC; JPL
35565	1998 GF_{6}	—	April 2, 1998	Socorro	LINEAR	MAR	3.3 km	MPC; JPL
35566	1998 GE_{7}	—	April 2, 1998	Socorro	LINEAR	EUN	6.0 km	MPC; JPL
35567	1998 GC_{9}	—	April 2, 1998	Socorro	LINEAR	·	2.4 km	MPC; JPL
35568	1998 GD_{9}	—	April 2, 1998	Socorro	LINEAR	EUN	5.0 km	MPC; JPL
35569	1998 GN_{9}	—	April 2, 1998	Socorro	LINEAR	MAR	4.7 km	MPC; JPL
35570	1998 GF_{10}	—	April 2, 1998	Socorro	LINEAR	·	6.7 km	MPC; JPL
35571	1998 HV_{6}	—	April 21, 1998	Les Tardieux Obs.	Boeuf, M.	·	6.8 km	MPC; JPL
35572	1998 HW_{6}	—	April 19, 1998	Nachi-Katsuura	Y. Shimizu, T. Urata	·	10 km	MPC; JPL
35573	1998 HH_{9}	—	April 18, 1998	Kitt Peak	Spacewatch	·	7.9 km	MPC; JPL
35574	1998 HE_{12}	—	April 19, 1998	Kitt Peak	Spacewatch	·	5.0 km	MPC; JPL
35575	1998 HC_{18}	—	April 18, 1998	Socorro	LINEAR	·	5.2 km	MPC; JPL
35576	1998 HB_{21}	—	April 20, 1998	Socorro	LINEAR	·	4.1 km	MPC; JPL
35577	1998 HZ_{26}	—	April 21, 1998	Kitt Peak	Spacewatch	·	5.1 km	MPC; JPL
35578	1998 HE_{34}	—	April 20, 1998	Socorro	LINEAR	KOR	3.7 km	MPC; JPL
35579	1998 HA_{36}	—	April 20, 1998	Socorro	LINEAR	AGN	3.9 km	MPC; JPL
35580	1998 HK_{39}	—	April 20, 1998	Socorro	LINEAR	NEM	8.3 km	MPC; JPL
35581	1998 HD_{40}	—	April 20, 1998	Socorro	LINEAR	·	5.0 km	MPC; JPL
35582	1998 HD_{45}	—	April 20, 1998	Socorro	LINEAR	·	4.6 km	MPC; JPL
35583	1998 HX_{45}	—	April 20, 1998	Socorro	LINEAR	·	4.4 km	MPC; JPL
35584	1998 HY_{46}	—	April 20, 1998	Socorro	LINEAR	·	4.9 km	MPC; JPL
35585	1998 HZ_{51}	—	April 30, 1998	Anderson Mesa	LONEOS	·	6.3 km	MPC; JPL
35586	1998 HG_{54}	—	April 21, 1998	Socorro	LINEAR	·	6.7 km	MPC; JPL
35587	1998 HR_{63}	—	April 21, 1998	Socorro	LINEAR	AGN	5.7 km	MPC; JPL
35588	1998 HU_{80}	—	April 21, 1998	Socorro	LINEAR	·	2.9 km	MPC; JPL
35589	1998 HY_{80}	—	April 21, 1998	Socorro	LINEAR	THM	7.8 km	MPC; JPL
35590	1998 HQ_{86}	—	April 21, 1998	Socorro	LINEAR	KOR	4.2 km	MPC; JPL
35591	1998 HB_{91}	—	April 21, 1998	Socorro	LINEAR	·	6.4 km	MPC; JPL
35592	1998 HR_{94}	—	April 21, 1998	Socorro	LINEAR	EUN	6.0 km	MPC; JPL
35593	1998 HP_{98}	—	April 21, 1998	Socorro	LINEAR	·	6.9 km	MPC; JPL
35594	1998 HY_{114}	—	April 23, 1998	Socorro	LINEAR	·	10 km	MPC; JPL
35595	1998 HO_{116}	—	April 23, 1998	Socorro	LINEAR	EUN	6.2 km	MPC; JPL
35596	1998 HZ_{117}	—	April 23, 1998	Socorro	LINEAR	·	4.2 km	MPC; JPL
35597	1998 HJ_{118}	—	April 23, 1998	Socorro	LINEAR	·	3.3 km	MPC; JPL
35598	1998 HZ_{118}	—	April 23, 1998	Socorro	LINEAR	·	11 km	MPC; JPL
35599	1998 HV_{120}	—	April 23, 1998	Socorro	LINEAR	EOS	5.3 km	MPC; JPL
35600	1998 HY_{121}	—	April 23, 1998	Socorro	LINEAR	·	3.3 km	MPC; JPL

== 35601–35700 ==
back to top

Designation			Discovery			Properties		Ref
Permanent	Provisional	Named after	Date	Site	Discoverer(s)	Category	Diam.	Ref
35601	1998 HJ_{122}	—	April 23, 1998	Socorro	LINEAR	·	4.3 km	MPC; JPL
35602	1998 HC_{124}	—	April 23, 1998	Socorro	LINEAR	·	7.0 km	MPC; JPL
35603	1998 HP_{124}	—	April 23, 1998	Socorro	LINEAR	PAD	5.8 km	MPC; JPL
35604	1998 HZ_{124}	—	April 23, 1998	Socorro	LINEAR	·	6.8 km	MPC; JPL
35605	1998 HU_{125}	—	April 23, 1998	Socorro	LINEAR	EOS	12 km	MPC; JPL
35606	1998 HG_{126}	—	April 23, 1998	Socorro	LINEAR	·	2.6 km	MPC; JPL
35607	1998 HJ_{127}	—	April 18, 1998	Socorro	LINEAR	·	3.1 km	MPC; JPL
35608	1998 HX_{127}	—	April 18, 1998	Socorro	LINEAR	MRX	2.6 km	MPC; JPL
35609	1998 HC_{132}	—	April 19, 1998	Socorro	LINEAR	·	4.3 km	MPC; JPL
35610	1998 HW_{133}	—	April 19, 1998	Socorro	LINEAR	·	2.3 km	MPC; JPL
35611	1998 HU_{136}	—	April 20, 1998	Socorro	LINEAR	·	6.6 km	MPC; JPL
35612	1998 HR_{137}	—	April 20, 1998	Socorro	LINEAR	·	5.0 km	MPC; JPL
35613	1998 HS_{147}	—	April 23, 1998	Socorro	LINEAR	EOS	6.0 km	MPC; JPL
35614	1998 HB_{148}	—	April 25, 1998	La Silla	E. W. Elst	THM	7.0 km	MPC; JPL
35615	1998 HE_{148}	—	April 25, 1998	La Silla	E. W. Elst	·	2.9 km	MPC; JPL
35616	1998 HN_{148}	—	April 25, 1998	La Silla	E. W. Elst	KOR	4.4 km	MPC; JPL
35617	1998 HY_{148}	—	April 25, 1998	La Silla	E. W. Elst	·	4.3 km	MPC; JPL
35618 Tartu	1998 HC_{149}	Tartu	April 25, 1998	La Silla	E. W. Elst	·	9.4 km	MPC; JPL
35619	1998 HT_{149}	—	April 25, 1998	La Silla	E. W. Elst	GEF	6.1 km	MPC; JPL
35620	1998 JZ	—	May 1, 1998	Haleakala	NEAT	ADE	7.4 km	MPC; JPL
35621 Lorius	1998 JD_{4}	Lorius	May 15, 1998	Modra	A. Galád, Pravda, A.	·	4.8 km	MPC; JPL
35622	1998 JF_{4}	—	May 5, 1998	Woomera	F. B. Zoltowski	·	7.1 km	MPC; JPL
35623 Pedrodavid	1998 KF_{7}	Pedrodavid	May 23, 1998	Anderson Mesa	LONEOS	·	4.9 km	MPC; JPL
35624	1998 KR_{7}	—	May 23, 1998	Anderson Mesa	LONEOS	·	8.1 km	MPC; JPL
35625	1998 KK_{8}	—	May 23, 1998	Anderson Mesa	LONEOS	EOS	6.5 km	MPC; JPL
35626	1998 KD_{9}	—	May 27, 1998	Anderson Mesa	LONEOS	·	3.7 km	MPC; JPL
35627	1998 KW_{9}	—	May 24, 1998	Xinglong	SCAP	LIX	15 km	MPC; JPL
35628	1998 KQ_{13}	—	May 22, 1998	Socorro	LINEAR	·	4.8 km	MPC; JPL
35629	1998 KK_{21}	—	May 22, 1998	Socorro	LINEAR	·	6.2 km	MPC; JPL
35630	1998 KQ_{23}	—	May 22, 1998	Socorro	LINEAR	HIL · 3:2 · (6124)	20 km	MPC; JPL
35631	1998 KL_{24}	—	May 22, 1998	Socorro	LINEAR	·	5.6 km	MPC; JPL
35632	1998 KA_{26}	—	May 22, 1998	Socorro	LINEAR	·	3.8 km	MPC; JPL
35633	1998 KM_{28}	—	May 22, 1998	Socorro	LINEAR	·	5.2 km	MPC; JPL
35634	1998 KS_{32}	—	May 22, 1998	Socorro	LINEAR	EOS	6.8 km	MPC; JPL
35635	1998 KV_{33}	—	May 22, 1998	Socorro	LINEAR	·	5.5 km	MPC; JPL
35636	1998 KO_{34}	—	May 22, 1998	Socorro	LINEAR	·	3.1 km	MPC; JPL
35637	1998 KV_{34}	—	May 22, 1998	Socorro	LINEAR	·	3.7 km	MPC; JPL
35638	1998 KU_{37}	—	May 22, 1998	Socorro	LINEAR	·	4.0 km	MPC; JPL
35639	1998 KY_{49}	—	May 23, 1998	Socorro	LINEAR	EOS	6.4 km	MPC; JPL
35640	1998 KN_{51}	—	May 23, 1998	Socorro	LINEAR	EOS	5.7 km	MPC; JPL
35641	1998 KT_{51}	—	May 23, 1998	Socorro	LINEAR	·	4.0 km	MPC; JPL
35642	1998 KF_{53}	—	May 23, 1998	Socorro	LINEAR	·	5.3 km	MPC; JPL
35643	1998 KN_{55}	—	May 23, 1998	Socorro	LINEAR	GEF	5.1 km	MPC; JPL
35644	1998 KW_{59}	—	May 23, 1998	Socorro	LINEAR	·	5.0 km	MPC; JPL
35645	1998 KU_{60}	—	May 23, 1998	Socorro	LINEAR	·	5.1 km	MPC; JPL
35646 Estela	1998 KO_{66}	Estela	May 18, 1998	Anderson Mesa	LONEOS	·	7.2 km	MPC; JPL
35647	1998 KA_{67}	—	May 23, 1998	Socorro	LINEAR	MAR	3.4 km	MPC; JPL
35648	1998 KR_{68}	—	May 29, 1998	Kitt Peak	Spacewatch	CLO	7.6 km	MPC; JPL
35649	1998 ML_{4}	—	June 23, 1998	Catalina	CSS	·	12 km	MPC; JPL
35650	1998 MD_{11}	—	June 19, 1998	Socorro	LINEAR	EOS	6.3 km	MPC; JPL
35651	1998 MS_{29}	—	June 24, 1998	Socorro	LINEAR	HYG	11 km	MPC; JPL
35652	1998 MT_{29}	—	June 24, 1998	Socorro	LINEAR	GEF	5.2 km	MPC; JPL
35653	1998 MF_{30}	—	June 24, 1998	Socorro	LINEAR	EOS	9.1 km	MPC; JPL
35654	1998 MR_{33}	—	June 24, 1998	Socorro	LINEAR	·	6.5 km	MPC; JPL
35655 Étienneklein	1998 OJ_{6}	Étienneklein	July 24, 1998	Caussols	ODAS	HYG	7.9 km	MPC; JPL
35656	1998 OZ_{12}	—	July 26, 1998	La Silla	E. W. Elst	·	19 km	MPC; JPL
35657	1998 QE_{5}	—	August 22, 1998	Xinglong	SCAP	·	6.7 km	MPC; JPL
35658	1998 QV_{9}	—	August 17, 1998	Socorro	LINEAR	BRG	3.8 km	MPC; JPL
35659	1998 QU_{10}	—	August 17, 1998	Socorro	LINEAR	·	10 km	MPC; JPL
35660	1998 QS_{38}	—	August 17, 1998	Socorro	LINEAR	·	10 km	MPC; JPL
35661	1998 QV_{39}	—	August 17, 1998	Socorro	LINEAR	NYS	4.3 km	MPC; JPL
35662	1998 QW_{40}	—	August 17, 1998	Socorro	LINEAR	·	1.7 km	MPC; JPL
35663	1998 QT_{50}	—	August 17, 1998	Socorro	LINEAR	·	5.4 km	MPC; JPL
35664	1998 QC_{64}	—	August 24, 1998	Socorro	LINEAR	·	12 km	MPC; JPL
35665	1998 RF_{18}	—	September 14, 1998	Socorro	LINEAR	NYS	2.2 km	MPC; JPL
35666	1998 RZ_{47}	—	September 14, 1998	Socorro	LINEAR	DOR	7.8 km	MPC; JPL
35667	1998 RN_{72}	—	September 14, 1998	Socorro	LINEAR	·	4.2 km	MPC; JPL
35668	1998 RB_{76}	—	September 14, 1998	Socorro	LINEAR	(2076)	2.9 km	MPC; JPL
35669	1998 SO_{12}	—	September 22, 1998	Višnjan Observatory	Višnjan	H	1.0 km	MPC; JPL
35670	1998 SU_{27}	—	September 24, 1998	Socorro	LINEAR	APO · critical	430 m	MPC; JPL
35671	1998 SN_{165}	—	September 23, 1998	Steward Observatory	Gleason, A.	other TNO	393 km	MPC; JPL
35672	1998 UZ_{14}	—	October 23, 1998	Kitt Peak	Spacewatch	L4	20 km	MPC; JPL
35673	1998 VQ_{15}	—	November 10, 1998	Socorro	LINEAR	L4	35 km	MPC; JPL
35674	1998 VC_{32}	—	November 14, 1998	Socorro	LINEAR	H	2.0 km	MPC; JPL
35675	1998 XK_{17}	—	December 15, 1998	Bédoin	P. Antonini	V	2.1 km	MPC; JPL
35676	1998 XA_{30}	—	December 14, 1998	Socorro	LINEAR	EUN	5.3 km	MPC; JPL
35677	1998 XE_{95}	—	December 15, 1998	Socorro	LINEAR	·	3.5 km	MPC; JPL
35678	1998 XW_{96}	—	December 11, 1998	Mérida	Naranjo, O. A.	·	6.3 km	MPC; JPL
35679	1998 YK_{3}	—	December 17, 1998	Oizumi	T. Kobayashi	·	3.2 km	MPC; JPL
35680	1999 AS_{21}	—	January 15, 1999	Višnjan Observatory	K. Korlević	·	1.9 km	MPC; JPL
35681	1999 BC_{2}	—	January 16, 1999	Nachi-Katsuura	Y. Shimizu, T. Urata	H	2.0 km	MPC; JPL
35682	1999 BP_{2}	—	January 18, 1999	Oizumi	T. Kobayashi	·	2.7 km	MPC; JPL
35683 Broumov	1999 BK_{5}	Broumov	January 21, 1999	Kleť	Kleť	·	1.8 km	MPC; JPL
35684	1999 BO_{5}	—	January 16, 1999	Kushiro	S. Ueda, H. Kaneda	·	6.1 km	MPC; JPL
35685	1999 BT_{11}	—	January 21, 1999	Caussols	ODAS	·	1.6 km	MPC; JPL
35686	1999 BW_{18}	—	January 16, 1999	Socorro	LINEAR	·	2.2 km	MPC; JPL
35687	1999 CP_{8}	—	February 6, 1999	Višnjan Observatory	K. Korlević	·	1.6 km	MPC; JPL
35688	1999 CD_{10}	—	February 15, 1999	High Point	D. K. Chesney	·	6.5 km	MPC; JPL
35689	1999 CD_{12}	—	February 12, 1999	Socorro	LINEAR	PHO	3.8 km	MPC; JPL
35690	1999 CT_{21}	—	February 10, 1999	Socorro	LINEAR	·	3.8 km	MPC; JPL
35691	1999 CE_{26}	—	February 10, 1999	Socorro	LINEAR	KOR	3.2 km	MPC; JPL
35692	1999 CV_{32}	—	February 10, 1999	Socorro	LINEAR	NYS	2.2 km	MPC; JPL
35693	1999 CQ_{48}	—	February 10, 1999	Socorro	LINEAR	·	2.1 km	MPC; JPL
35694	1999 CP_{54}	—	February 10, 1999	Socorro	LINEAR	·	2.8 km	MPC; JPL
35695	1999 CE_{57}	—	February 10, 1999	Socorro	LINEAR	(2076)	3.3 km	MPC; JPL
35696	1999 CE_{97}	—	February 10, 1999	Socorro	LINEAR	MAS	2.4 km	MPC; JPL
35697	1999 CG_{104}	—	February 12, 1999	Socorro	LINEAR	slow	3.7 km	MPC; JPL
35698	1999 CJ_{118}	—	February 12, 1999	Socorro	LINEAR	·	2.4 km	MPC; JPL
35699	1999 CO_{118}	—	February 13, 1999	Socorro	LINEAR	·	1.9 km	MPC; JPL
35700	1999 DL_{2}	—	February 19, 1999	Oizumi	T. Kobayashi	·	2.7 km	MPC; JPL

== 35701–35800 ==
back to top

Designation			Discovery			Properties		Ref
Permanent	Provisional	Named after	Date	Site	Discoverer(s)	Category	Diam.	Ref
35701	1999 FF_{7}	—	March 16, 1999	Višnjan Observatory	K. Korlević	·	2.6 km	MPC; JPL
35702	1999 FN_{9}	—	March 22, 1999	Anderson Mesa	LONEOS	·	2.3 km	MPC; JPL
35703 Lafiascaia	1999 FP_{10}	Lafiascaia	March 20, 1999	Montelupo	M. Tombelli, Masotti, E.	·	3.6 km	MPC; JPL
35704	1999 FB_{13}	—	March 19, 1999	Kitt Peak	Spacewatch	·	2.5 km	MPC; JPL
35705	1999 FK_{17}	—	March 23, 1999	Kitt Peak	Spacewatch	·	2.4 km	MPC; JPL
35706	1999 FG_{25}	—	March 19, 1999	Socorro	LINEAR	·	3.0 km	MPC; JPL
35707	1999 FZ_{25}	—	March 19, 1999	Socorro	LINEAR	·	3.6 km	MPC; JPL
35708	1999 FX_{27}	—	March 19, 1999	Socorro	LINEAR	·	3.4 km	MPC; JPL
35709	1999 FR_{28}	—	March 19, 1999	Socorro	LINEAR	·	7.2 km	MPC; JPL
35710	1999 FT_{29}	—	March 19, 1999	Socorro	LINEAR	·	4.2 km	MPC; JPL
35711	1999 FZ_{29}	—	March 19, 1999	Socorro	LINEAR	·	4.3 km	MPC; JPL
35712	1999 FF_{30}	—	March 19, 1999	Socorro	LINEAR	·	2.4 km	MPC; JPL
35713	1999 FS_{30}	—	March 19, 1999	Socorro	LINEAR	·	2.1 km	MPC; JPL
35714	1999 FB_{31}	—	March 19, 1999	Socorro	LINEAR	·	2.3 km	MPC; JPL
35715	1999 FD_{32}	—	March 19, 1999	Socorro	LINEAR	NYS	2.5 km	MPC; JPL
35716	1999 FY_{32}	—	March 19, 1999	Socorro	LINEAR	·	3.3 km	MPC; JPL
35717	1999 FK_{33}	—	March 19, 1999	Socorro	LINEAR	·	4.1 km	MPC; JPL
35718	1999 FE_{34}	—	March 19, 1999	Socorro	LINEAR	·	2.1 km	MPC; JPL
35719	1999 FY_{34}	—	March 19, 1999	Socorro	LINEAR	V	2.2 km	MPC; JPL
35720	1999 FP_{36}	—	March 20, 1999	Socorro	LINEAR	BAP	3.7 km	MPC; JPL
35721	1999 FW_{39}	—	March 20, 1999	Socorro	LINEAR	·	2.7 km	MPC; JPL
35722	1999 FM_{41}	—	March 20, 1999	Socorro	LINEAR	·	1.8 km	MPC; JPL
35723	1999 FT_{42}	—	March 20, 1999	Socorro	LINEAR	·	3.3 km	MPC; JPL
35724	1999 FW_{53}	—	March 20, 1999	Socorro	LINEAR	·	4.2 km	MPC; JPL
35725 Tramuntana	1999 FQ_{59}	Tramuntana	March 27, 1999	Majorca	Á. López J., R. Pacheco	·	3.3 km	MPC; JPL
35726	1999 GW	—	April 5, 1999	Višnjan Observatory	K. Korlević	·	2.2 km	MPC; JPL
35727	1999 GM_{1}	—	April 7, 1999	Oizumi	T. Kobayashi	·	2.8 km	MPC; JPL
35728	1999 GA_{2}	—	April 6, 1999	Anderson Mesa	LONEOS	·	3.3 km	MPC; JPL
35729	1999 GZ_{4}	—	April 13, 1999	Woomera	F. B. Zoltowski	·	4.5 km	MPC; JPL
35730	1999 GM_{7}	—	April 7, 1999	Anderson Mesa	LONEOS	·	1.9 km	MPC; JPL
35731	1999 GH_{8}	—	April 9, 1999	Anderson Mesa	LONEOS	NYS	2.3 km	MPC; JPL
35732	1999 GL_{8}	—	April 9, 1999	Anderson Mesa	LONEOS	·	2.8 km	MPC; JPL
35733	1999 GW_{8}	—	April 10, 1999	Anderson Mesa	LONEOS	·	2.0 km	MPC; JPL
35734 Dilithium	1999 GT_{9}	Dilithium	April 14, 1999	Goodricke-Pigott	R. A. Tucker	·	2.2 km	MPC; JPL
35735	1999 GP_{11}	—	April 11, 1999	Kitt Peak	Spacewatch	(5)	3.0 km	MPC; JPL
35736	1999 GQ_{19}	—	April 15, 1999	Socorro	LINEAR	·	3.1 km	MPC; JPL
35737	1999 GN_{20}	—	April 15, 1999	Socorro	LINEAR	·	4.3 km	MPC; JPL
35738	1999 GO_{20}	—	April 15, 1999	Socorro	LINEAR	(1338) (FLO)	2.8 km	MPC; JPL
35739	1999 GR_{21}	—	April 15, 1999	Socorro	LINEAR	·	3.2 km	MPC; JPL
35740	1999 GK_{24}	—	April 6, 1999	Socorro	LINEAR	·	4.5 km	MPC; JPL
35741	1999 GX_{24}	—	April 6, 1999	Socorro	LINEAR	·	2.6 km	MPC; JPL
35742	1999 GD_{29}	—	April 7, 1999	Socorro	LINEAR	·	3.5 km	MPC; JPL
35743	1999 GP_{29}	—	April 7, 1999	Socorro	LINEAR	·	1.8 km	MPC; JPL
35744	1999 GF_{30}	—	April 7, 1999	Socorro	LINEAR	·	1.7 km	MPC; JPL
35745	1999 GZ_{30}	—	April 7, 1999	Socorro	LINEAR	NYS ·	5.0 km	MPC; JPL
35746	1999 GX_{31}	—	April 7, 1999	Socorro	LINEAR	·	3.3 km	MPC; JPL
35747	1999 GE_{32}	—	April 7, 1999	Socorro	LINEAR	·	4.1 km	MPC; JPL
35748	1999 GK_{32}	—	April 7, 1999	Socorro	LINEAR	·	2.5 km	MPC; JPL
35749	1999 GF_{33}	—	April 12, 1999	Socorro	LINEAR	·	2.9 km	MPC; JPL
35750	1999 GP_{34}	—	April 6, 1999	Socorro	LINEAR	·	2.3 km	MPC; JPL
35751	1999 GE_{36}	—	April 7, 1999	Socorro	LINEAR	·	2.8 km	MPC; JPL
35752	1999 GW_{36}	—	April 14, 1999	Socorro	LINEAR	NYS	2.1 km	MPC; JPL
35753	1999 GE_{45}	—	April 12, 1999	Socorro	LINEAR	·	3.9 km	MPC; JPL
35754	1999 GN_{50}	—	April 10, 1999	Anderson Mesa	LONEOS	·	2.2 km	MPC; JPL
35755	1999 GV_{53}	—	April 11, 1999	Anderson Mesa	LONEOS	·	2.2 km	MPC; JPL
35756	1999 GX_{58}	—	April 12, 1999	Socorro	LINEAR	·	5.1 km	MPC; JPL
35757	1999 GY_{60}	—	April 15, 1999	Socorro	LINEAR	·	1.7 km	MPC; JPL
35758	1999 HE	—	April 16, 1999	Woomera	F. B. Zoltowski	·	2.9 km	MPC; JPL
35759	1999 HQ	—	April 17, 1999	Woomera	F. B. Zoltowski	NYS	6.5 km	MPC; JPL
35760	1999 HP_{1}	—	April 17, 1999	Socorro	LINEAR	PHO	2.1 km	MPC; JPL
35761	1999 HC_{2}	—	April 21, 1999	Kleť	Kleť	·	5.0 km	MPC; JPL
35762	1999 HF_{2}	—	April 20, 1999	Višnjan Observatory	K. Korlević, M. Jurić	·	2.0 km	MPC; JPL
35763	1999 HK_{3}	—	April 16, 1999	Catalina	CSS	·	2.6 km	MPC; JPL
35764	1999 HP_{7}	—	April 19, 1999	Kitt Peak	Spacewatch	·	2.3 km	MPC; JPL
35765	1999 HR_{8}	—	April 17, 1999	Socorro	LINEAR	NYS ·	6.2 km	MPC; JPL
35766	1999 HB_{9}	—	April 17, 1999	Socorro	LINEAR	·	2.9 km	MPC; JPL
35767	1999 JM	—	May 6, 1999	Oizumi	T. Kobayashi	PHO	4.6 km	MPC; JPL
35768 Wendybauer	1999 JR_{1}	Wendybauer	May 8, 1999	Catalina	CSS	KOR	3.3 km	MPC; JPL
35769 Tombauer	1999 JX_{1}	Tombauer	May 8, 1999	Catalina	CSS	V	2.5 km	MPC; JPL
35770	1999 JH_{2}	—	May 8, 1999	Catalina	CSS	·	2.1 km	MPC; JPL
35771	1999 JE_{6}	—	May 11, 1999	Nachi-Katsuura	Y. Shimizu, T. Urata	·	4.0 km	MPC; JPL
35772	1999 JM_{7}	—	May 8, 1999	Catalina	CSS	V	2.8 km	MPC; JPL
35773	1999 JT_{7}	—	May 13, 1999	Reedy Creek	J. Broughton	·	1.9 km	MPC; JPL
35774	1999 JL_{9}	—	May 7, 1999	Catalina	CSS	·	5.2 km	MPC; JPL
35775	1999 JW_{9}	—	May 8, 1999	Catalina	CSS	·	3.2 km	MPC; JPL
35776	1999 JE_{11}	—	May 9, 1999	Višnjan Observatory	K. Korlević	NYS	1.7 km	MPC; JPL
35777	1999 JB_{13}	—	May 10, 1999	Višnjan Observatory	K. Korlević	CLO ·	4.8 km	MPC; JPL
35778	1999 JL_{16}	—	May 15, 1999	Kitt Peak	Spacewatch	·	2.9 km	MPC; JPL
35779	1999 JB_{18}	—	May 10, 1999	Socorro	LINEAR	·	3.0 km	MPC; JPL
35780	1999 JR_{18}	—	May 10, 1999	Socorro	LINEAR	(5)	3.6 km	MPC; JPL
35781	1999 JA_{19}	—	May 10, 1999	Socorro	LINEAR	·	2.4 km	MPC; JPL
35782	1999 JW_{19}	—	May 10, 1999	Socorro	LINEAR	(2076)	2.8 km	MPC; JPL
35783	1999 JU_{20}	—	May 10, 1999	Socorro	LINEAR	·	3.5 km	MPC; JPL
35784	1999 JS_{21}	—	May 10, 1999	Socorro	LINEAR	·	2.3 km	MPC; JPL
35785	1999 JY_{21}	—	May 10, 1999	Socorro	LINEAR	·	2.4 km	MPC; JPL
35786	1999 JR_{22}	—	May 10, 1999	Socorro	LINEAR	·	3.0 km	MPC; JPL
35787	1999 JY_{22}	—	May 10, 1999	Socorro	LINEAR	·	2.7 km	MPC; JPL
35788	1999 JL_{24}	—	May 10, 1999	Socorro	LINEAR	PHO	3.6 km	MPC; JPL
35789	1999 JF_{25}	—	May 10, 1999	Socorro	LINEAR	·	1.7 km	MPC; JPL
35790	1999 JG_{25}	—	May 10, 1999	Socorro	LINEAR	·	2.8 km	MPC; JPL
35791	1999 JK_{25}	—	May 10, 1999	Socorro	LINEAR	·	2.8 km	MPC; JPL
35792	1999 JL_{29}	—	May 10, 1999	Socorro	LINEAR	·	2.9 km	MPC; JPL
35793	1999 JN_{30}	—	May 10, 1999	Socorro	LINEAR	·	4.9 km	MPC; JPL
35794	1999 JB_{31}	—	May 10, 1999	Socorro	LINEAR	·	2.3 km	MPC; JPL
35795	1999 JF_{31}	—	May 10, 1999	Socorro	LINEAR	(1338) (FLO)	1.5 km	MPC; JPL
35796	1999 JL_{31}	—	May 10, 1999	Socorro	LINEAR	·	2.0 km	MPC; JPL
35797	1999 JY_{31}	—	May 10, 1999	Socorro	LINEAR	·	3.0 km	MPC; JPL
35798	1999 JJ_{32}	—	May 10, 1999	Socorro	LINEAR	NYS	2.0 km	MPC; JPL
35799	1999 JK_{32}	—	May 10, 1999	Socorro	LINEAR	·	2.6 km	MPC; JPL
35800	1999 JT_{32}	—	May 10, 1999	Socorro	LINEAR	·	2.6 km	MPC; JPL

== 35801–35900 ==
back to top

Designation			Discovery			Properties		Ref
Permanent	Provisional	Named after	Date	Site	Discoverer(s)	Category	Diam.	Ref
35801	1999 JB_{38}	—	May 10, 1999	Socorro	LINEAR	·	3.7 km	MPC; JPL
35802	1999 JF_{39}	—	May 10, 1999	Socorro	LINEAR	·	2.0 km	MPC; JPL
35803	1999 JT_{40}	—	May 10, 1999	Socorro	LINEAR	·	1.8 km	MPC; JPL
35804	1999 JK_{41}	—	May 10, 1999	Socorro	LINEAR	·	3.0 km	MPC; JPL
35805	1999 JP_{41}	—	May 10, 1999	Socorro	LINEAR	·	3.0 km	MPC; JPL
35806	1999 JB_{42}	—	May 10, 1999	Socorro	LINEAR	MAS	1.7 km	MPC; JPL
35807	1999 JS_{42}	—	May 10, 1999	Socorro	LINEAR	slow	2.2 km	MPC; JPL
35808	1999 JA_{43}	—	May 10, 1999	Socorro	LINEAR	·	5.5 km	MPC; JPL
35809	1999 JY_{43}	—	May 10, 1999	Socorro	LINEAR	·	4.5 km	MPC; JPL
35810	1999 JB_{44}	—	May 10, 1999	Socorro	LINEAR	·	4.3 km	MPC; JPL
35811	1999 JS_{45}	—	May 10, 1999	Socorro	LINEAR	·	4.0 km	MPC; JPL
35812	1999 JD_{46}	—	May 10, 1999	Socorro	LINEAR	·	2.9 km	MPC; JPL
35813	1999 JM_{47}	—	May 10, 1999	Socorro	LINEAR	·	6.8 km	MPC; JPL
35814	1999 JK_{48}	—	May 10, 1999	Socorro	LINEAR	·	3.1 km	MPC; JPL
35815	1999 JO_{48}	—	May 10, 1999	Socorro	LINEAR	·	5.8 km	MPC; JPL
35816	1999 JU_{49}	—	May 10, 1999	Socorro	LINEAR	·	2.2 km	MPC; JPL
35817	1999 JV_{49}	—	May 10, 1999	Socorro	LINEAR	NYS	2.6 km	MPC; JPL
35818	1999 JC_{50}	—	May 10, 1999	Socorro	LINEAR	·	4.3 km	MPC; JPL
35819	1999 JG_{50}	—	May 10, 1999	Socorro	LINEAR	·	2.1 km	MPC; JPL
35820	1999 JM_{50}	—	May 10, 1999	Socorro	LINEAR	V	1.8 km	MPC; JPL
35821	1999 JW_{50}	—	May 10, 1999	Socorro	LINEAR	V	2.8 km	MPC; JPL
35822	1999 JD_{52}	—	May 10, 1999	Socorro	LINEAR	·	2.8 km	MPC; JPL
35823	1999 JQ_{52}	—	May 10, 1999	Socorro	LINEAR	·	1.8 km	MPC; JPL
35824	1999 JF_{53}	—	May 10, 1999	Socorro	LINEAR	V	2.3 km	MPC; JPL
35825	1999 JL_{53}	—	May 10, 1999	Socorro	LINEAR	·	3.5 km	MPC; JPL
35826	1999 JT_{53}	—	May 10, 1999	Socorro	LINEAR	·	3.1 km	MPC; JPL
35827	1999 JY_{53}	—	May 10, 1999	Socorro	LINEAR	·	4.3 km	MPC; JPL
35828	1999 JZ_{53}	—	May 10, 1999	Socorro	LINEAR	·	2.2 km	MPC; JPL
35829	1999 JH_{54}	—	May 10, 1999	Socorro	LINEAR	·	3.5 km	MPC; JPL
35830	1999 JL_{54}	—	May 10, 1999	Socorro	LINEAR	·	5.1 km	MPC; JPL
35831	1999 JN_{55}	—	May 10, 1999	Socorro	LINEAR	·	5.5 km	MPC; JPL
35832	1999 JR_{56}	—	May 10, 1999	Socorro	LINEAR	·	3.4 km	MPC; JPL
35833	1999 JN_{57}	—	May 10, 1999	Socorro	LINEAR	·	3.4 km	MPC; JPL
35834	1999 JT_{57}	—	May 10, 1999	Socorro	LINEAR	fast	6.9 km	MPC; JPL
35835	1999 JD_{58}	—	May 10, 1999	Socorro	LINEAR	·	3.8 km	MPC; JPL
35836	1999 JG_{58}	—	May 10, 1999	Socorro	LINEAR	NYS	5.3 km	MPC; JPL
35837	1999 JH_{58}	—	May 10, 1999	Socorro	LINEAR	·	9.9 km	MPC; JPL
35838	1999 JN_{58}	—	May 10, 1999	Socorro	LINEAR	V	2.8 km	MPC; JPL
35839	1999 JV_{58}	—	May 10, 1999	Socorro	LINEAR	·	4.1 km	MPC; JPL
35840	1999 JH_{59}	—	May 10, 1999	Socorro	LINEAR	·	5.0 km	MPC; JPL
35841	1999 JR_{59}	—	May 10, 1999	Socorro	LINEAR	·	2.0 km	MPC; JPL
35842	1999 JX_{59}	—	May 10, 1999	Socorro	LINEAR	·	3.6 km	MPC; JPL
35843	1999 JZ_{59}	—	May 10, 1999	Socorro	LINEAR	MAS	2.6 km	MPC; JPL
35844	1999 JD_{60}	—	May 10, 1999	Socorro	LINEAR	·	7.1 km	MPC; JPL
35845	1999 JM_{60}	—	May 10, 1999	Socorro	LINEAR	·	3.9 km	MPC; JPL
35846	1999 JO_{60}	—	May 10, 1999	Socorro	LINEAR	·	3.0 km	MPC; JPL
35847	1999 JJ_{61}	—	May 10, 1999	Socorro	LINEAR	·	5.9 km	MPC; JPL
35848	1999 JY_{61}	—	May 10, 1999	Socorro	LINEAR	·	5.3 km	MPC; JPL
35849	1999 JK_{62}	—	May 10, 1999	Socorro	LINEAR	·	2.0 km	MPC; JPL
35850	1999 JS_{62}	—	May 10, 1999	Socorro	LINEAR	·	3.7 km	MPC; JPL
35851	1999 JW_{62}	—	May 10, 1999	Socorro	LINEAR	(5)	3.3 km	MPC; JPL
35852	1999 JD_{63}	—	May 10, 1999	Socorro	LINEAR	V	2.2 km	MPC; JPL
35853	1999 JY_{63}	—	May 10, 1999	Socorro	LINEAR	(5)	4.1 km	MPC; JPL
35854	1999 JZ_{63}	—	May 10, 1999	Socorro	LINEAR	·	7.1 km	MPC; JPL
35855	1999 JC_{64}	—	May 10, 1999	Socorro	LINEAR	·	7.5 km	MPC; JPL
35856	1999 JG_{64}	—	May 10, 1999	Socorro	LINEAR	·	6.3 km	MPC; JPL
35857	1999 JN_{64}	—	May 10, 1999	Socorro	LINEAR	·	3.5 km	MPC; JPL
35858	1999 JZ_{65}	—	May 12, 1999	Socorro	LINEAR	·	4.5 km	MPC; JPL
35859	1999 JN_{66}	—	May 12, 1999	Socorro	LINEAR	·	3.5 km	MPC; JPL
35860	1999 JO_{66}	—	May 12, 1999	Socorro	LINEAR	·	3.9 km	MPC; JPL
35861	1999 JT_{66}	—	May 12, 1999	Socorro	LINEAR	NYS	1.7 km	MPC; JPL
35862	1999 JO_{67}	—	May 12, 1999	Socorro	LINEAR	·	4.3 km	MPC; JPL
35863	1999 JX_{67}	—	May 12, 1999	Socorro	LINEAR	·	3.8 km	MPC; JPL
35864	1999 JG_{68}	—	May 12, 1999	Socorro	LINEAR	(5)	6.9 km	MPC; JPL
35865	1999 JL_{68}	—	May 12, 1999	Socorro	LINEAR	NYS	2.2 km	MPC; JPL
35866	1999 JM_{68}	—	May 12, 1999	Socorro	LINEAR	·	2.6 km	MPC; JPL
35867	1999 JO_{68}	—	May 12, 1999	Socorro	LINEAR	(2076)	3.5 km	MPC; JPL
35868	1999 JP_{68}	—	May 12, 1999	Socorro	LINEAR	NYS	1.7 km	MPC; JPL
35869	1999 JR_{68}	—	May 12, 1999	Socorro	LINEAR	·	4.9 km	MPC; JPL
35870	1999 JQ_{69}	—	May 12, 1999	Socorro	LINEAR	·	1.8 km	MPC; JPL
35871	1999 JW_{70}	—	May 12, 1999	Socorro	LINEAR	V	1.9 km	MPC; JPL
35872	1999 JB_{72}	—	May 12, 1999	Socorro	LINEAR	·	1.7 km	MPC; JPL
35873	1999 JO_{72}	—	May 12, 1999	Socorro	LINEAR	·	1.6 km	MPC; JPL
35874	1999 JU_{72}	—	May 12, 1999	Socorro	LINEAR	·	2.2 km	MPC; JPL
35875	1999 JP_{73}	—	May 12, 1999	Socorro	LINEAR	·	4.6 km	MPC; JPL
35876	1999 JX_{74}	—	May 12, 1999	Socorro	LINEAR	EUN	3.9 km	MPC; JPL
35877	1999 JR_{75}	—	May 10, 1999	Socorro	LINEAR	·	4.4 km	MPC; JPL
35878	1999 JX_{75}	—	May 10, 1999	Socorro	LINEAR	·	2.8 km	MPC; JPL
35879	1999 JA_{76}	—	May 10, 1999	Socorro	LINEAR	·	2.5 km	MPC; JPL
35880	1999 JC_{76}	—	May 10, 1999	Socorro	LINEAR	slow	4.2 km	MPC; JPL
35881	1999 JM_{77}	—	May 12, 1999	Socorro	LINEAR	·	3.7 km	MPC; JPL
35882	1999 JT_{77}	—	May 12, 1999	Socorro	LINEAR	·	2.0 km	MPC; JPL
35883	1999 JH_{78}	—	May 13, 1999	Socorro	LINEAR	·	3.6 km	MPC; JPL
35884	1999 JW_{78}	—	May 13, 1999	Socorro	LINEAR	·	2.5 km	MPC; JPL
35885	1999 JO_{79}	—	May 13, 1999	Socorro	LINEAR	MAS	1.9 km	MPC; JPL
35886	1999 JG_{80}	—	May 12, 1999	Socorro	LINEAR	V	4.0 km	MPC; JPL
35887	1999 JH_{80}	—	May 12, 1999	Socorro	LINEAR	RAF	2.7 km	MPC; JPL
35888	1999 JS_{80}	—	May 12, 1999	Socorro	LINEAR	·	4.2 km	MPC; JPL
35889	1999 JA_{81}	—	May 12, 1999	Socorro	LINEAR	EUN	3.7 km	MPC; JPL
35890	1999 JR_{81}	—	May 12, 1999	Socorro	LINEAR	·	4.0 km	MPC; JPL
35891	1999 JS_{81}	—	May 12, 1999	Socorro	LINEAR	·	5.1 km	MPC; JPL
35892	1999 JV_{82}	—	May 12, 1999	Socorro	LINEAR	EUN	6.3 km	MPC; JPL
35893	1999 JC_{83}	—	May 12, 1999	Socorro	LINEAR	slow	2.3 km	MPC; JPL
35894	1999 JF_{83}	—	May 12, 1999	Socorro	LINEAR	EUN	5.1 km	MPC; JPL
35895	1999 JX_{83}	—	May 12, 1999	Socorro	LINEAR	·	2.3 km	MPC; JPL
35896	1999 JW_{84}	—	May 13, 1999	Socorro	LINEAR	·	5.3 km	MPC; JPL
35897	1999 JU_{85}	—	May 10, 1999	Socorro	LINEAR	·	4.0 km	MPC; JPL
35898	1999 JC_{86}	—	May 12, 1999	Socorro	LINEAR	·	2.0 km	MPC; JPL
35899	1999 JC_{87}	—	May 12, 1999	Socorro	LINEAR	·	7.0 km	MPC; JPL
35900	1999 JH_{88}	—	May 12, 1999	Socorro	LINEAR	·	2.1 km	MPC; JPL

== 35901–36000 ==
back to top

Designation			Discovery			Properties		Ref
Permanent	Provisional	Named after	Date	Site	Discoverer(s)	Category	Diam.	Ref
35901	1999 JK_{88}	—	May 12, 1999	Socorro	LINEAR	·	3.3 km	MPC; JPL
35902	1999 JM_{88}	—	May 12, 1999	Socorro	LINEAR	V	1.6 km	MPC; JPL
35903	1999 JY_{88}	—	May 12, 1999	Socorro	LINEAR	EUN	5.0 km	MPC; JPL
35904	1999 JJ_{89}	—	May 12, 1999	Socorro	LINEAR	·	2.9 km	MPC; JPL
35905	1999 JA_{92}	—	May 12, 1999	Socorro	LINEAR	·	1.9 km	MPC; JPL
35906	1999 JL_{92}	—	May 12, 1999	Socorro	LINEAR	EUN	2.7 km	MPC; JPL
35907	1999 JO_{92}	—	May 12, 1999	Socorro	LINEAR	·	2.0 km	MPC; JPL
35908	1999 JP_{92}	—	May 12, 1999	Socorro	LINEAR	·	2.4 km	MPC; JPL
35909	1999 JY_{93}	—	May 12, 1999	Socorro	LINEAR	V	2.6 km	MPC; JPL
35910	1999 JZ_{93}	—	May 12, 1999	Socorro	LINEAR	·	1.9 km	MPC; JPL
35911	1999 JB_{95}	—	May 12, 1999	Socorro	LINEAR	·	4.2 km	MPC; JPL
35912	1999 JY_{95}	—	May 12, 1999	Socorro	LINEAR	·	3.4 km	MPC; JPL
35913	1999 JC_{97}	—	May 12, 1999	Socorro	LINEAR	·	7.9 km	MPC; JPL
35914	1999 JM_{97}	—	May 12, 1999	Socorro	LINEAR	V	1.9 km	MPC; JPL
35915	1999 JV_{97}	—	May 12, 1999	Socorro	LINEAR	·	7.9 km	MPC; JPL
35916	1999 JS_{98}	—	May 12, 1999	Socorro	LINEAR	·	4.5 km	MPC; JPL
35917	1999 JK_{99}	—	May 13, 1999	Socorro	LINEAR	GEF	3.2 km	MPC; JPL
35918	1999 JL_{99}	—	May 12, 1999	Socorro	LINEAR	·	4.5 km	MPC; JPL
35919	1999 JY_{99}	—	May 12, 1999	Socorro	LINEAR	·	11 km	MPC; JPL
35920	1999 JJ_{101}	—	May 13, 1999	Socorro	LINEAR	·	2.7 km	MPC; JPL
35921	1999 JU_{101}	—	May 13, 1999	Socorro	LINEAR	·	1.7 km	MPC; JPL
35922	1999 JO_{102}	—	May 13, 1999	Socorro	LINEAR	·	2.7 km	MPC; JPL
35923	1999 JX_{103}	—	May 13, 1999	Socorro	LINEAR	EUN	2.8 km	MPC; JPL
35924	1999 JA_{104}	—	May 14, 1999	Socorro	LINEAR	PHO	7.7 km	MPC; JPL
35925	1999 JP_{104}	—	May 15, 1999	Socorro	LINEAR	·	4.4 km	MPC; JPL
35926	1999 JL_{105}	—	May 13, 1999	Socorro	LINEAR	·	6.9 km	MPC; JPL
35927	1999 JN_{106}	—	May 13, 1999	Socorro	LINEAR	·	4.8 km	MPC; JPL
35928	1999 JV_{107}	—	May 13, 1999	Socorro	LINEAR	·	3.8 km	MPC; JPL
35929	1999 JK_{108}	—	May 13, 1999	Socorro	LINEAR	EUN	4.4 km	MPC; JPL
35930	1999 JD_{110}	—	May 13, 1999	Socorro	LINEAR	·	1.8 km	MPC; JPL
35931	1999 JW_{112}	—	May 13, 1999	Socorro	LINEAR	·	2.0 km	MPC; JPL
35932	1999 JP_{113}	—	May 13, 1999	Socorro	LINEAR	·	2.1 km	MPC; JPL
35933	1999 JD_{117}	—	May 13, 1999	Socorro	LINEAR	·	3.8 km	MPC; JPL
35934	1999 JZ_{120}	—	May 13, 1999	Socorro	LINEAR	V	2.0 km	MPC; JPL
35935	1999 JO_{122}	—	May 13, 1999	Socorro	LINEAR	·	2.2 km	MPC; JPL
35936	1999 JX_{123}	—	May 14, 1999	Socorro	LINEAR	·	3.3 km	MPC; JPL
35937	1999 JD_{124}	—	May 14, 1999	Socorro	LINEAR	·	2.7 km	MPC; JPL
35938	1999 JQ_{125}	—	May 10, 1999	Socorro	LINEAR	·	2.9 km	MPC; JPL
35939	1999 JO_{127}	—	May 13, 1999	Socorro	LINEAR	EUN	4.4 km	MPC; JPL
35940	1999 JE_{128}	—	May 10, 1999	Socorro	LINEAR	·	1.8 km	MPC; JPL
35941	1999 JT_{129}	—	May 12, 1999	Socorro	LINEAR	EUN	3.7 km	MPC; JPL
35942	1999 JP_{132}	—	May 13, 1999	Socorro	LINEAR	·	1.7 km	MPC; JPL
35943	1999 KP_{2}	—	May 16, 1999	Kitt Peak	Spacewatch	·	4.6 km	MPC; JPL
35944	1999 KT_{2}	—	May 16, 1999	Kitt Peak	Spacewatch	MAS	1.7 km	MPC; JPL
35945	1999 KU_{2}	—	May 16, 1999	Kitt Peak	Spacewatch	·	3.0 km	MPC; JPL
35946	1999 KO_{4}	—	May 20, 1999	Prescott	P. G. Comba	NYS	3.7 km	MPC; JPL
35947	1999 KT_{5}	—	May 16, 1999	Kitt Peak	Spacewatch	MAR	4.3 km	MPC; JPL
35948	1999 KD_{6}	—	May 17, 1999	Kitt Peak	Spacewatch	NEM	4.8 km	MPC; JPL
35949	1999 KQ_{10}	—	May 18, 1999	Socorro	LINEAR	NYS	5.7 km	MPC; JPL
35950	1999 KL_{13}	—	May 18, 1999	Socorro	LINEAR	·	3.8 km	MPC; JPL
35951	1999 KE_{14}	—	May 18, 1999	Socorro	LINEAR	·	4.0 km	MPC; JPL
35952	1999 KN_{14}	—	May 18, 1999	Socorro	LINEAR	·	3.1 km	MPC; JPL
35953	1999 KJ_{15}	—	May 20, 1999	Socorro	LINEAR	·	8.7 km	MPC; JPL
35954	1999 KY_{15}	—	May 18, 1999	Socorro	LINEAR	slow	3.1 km	MPC; JPL
35955	1999 KS_{17}	—	May 17, 1999	Catalina	CSS	KOR	4.1 km	MPC; JPL
35956	1999 LG_{2}	—	June 8, 1999	Socorro	LINEAR	·	2.2 km	MPC; JPL
35957	1999 LZ_{3}	—	June 9, 1999	Socorro	LINEAR	·	2.1 km	MPC; JPL
35958	1999 LF_{4}	—	June 9, 1999	Socorro	LINEAR	V	3.1 km	MPC; JPL
35959	1999 LE_{5}	—	June 10, 1999	Socorro	LINEAR	·	3.9 km	MPC; JPL
35960	1999 LB_{7}	—	June 9, 1999	Kitt Peak	Spacewatch	·	3.2 km	MPC; JPL
35961	1999 LH_{7}	—	June 12, 1999	Višnjan Observatory	K. Korlević	·	7.5 km	MPC; JPL
35962	1999 LX_{9}	—	June 8, 1999	Socorro	LINEAR	·	6.4 km	MPC; JPL
35963	1999 LL_{11}	—	June 8, 1999	Socorro	LINEAR	MAR	4.1 km	MPC; JPL
35964	1999 LC_{13}	—	June 9, 1999	Socorro	LINEAR	V	1.8 km	MPC; JPL
35965	1999 LH_{13}	—	June 9, 1999	Socorro	LINEAR	·	3.2 km	MPC; JPL
35966	1999 LJ_{13}	—	June 9, 1999	Socorro	LINEAR	·	2.3 km	MPC; JPL
35967	1999 LG_{14}	—	June 9, 1999	Socorro	LINEAR	·	3.5 km	MPC; JPL
35968	1999 LK_{14}	—	June 9, 1999	Socorro	LINEAR	·	3.6 km	MPC; JPL
35969	1999 LY_{14}	—	June 11, 1999	Socorro	LINEAR	V	1.8 km	MPC; JPL
35970	1999 LE_{21}	—	June 9, 1999	Socorro	LINEAR	·	2.3 km	MPC; JPL
35971	1999 LJ_{26}	—	June 9, 1999	Socorro	LINEAR	V	2.8 km	MPC; JPL
35972	1999 LL_{26}	—	June 9, 1999	Socorro	LINEAR	·	3.1 km	MPC; JPL
35973	1999 LU_{26}	—	June 9, 1999	Socorro	LINEAR	·	5.4 km	MPC; JPL
35974	1999 LW_{26}	—	June 9, 1999	Socorro	LINEAR	V	2.7 km	MPC; JPL
35975	1999 LG_{27}	—	June 9, 1999	Socorro	LINEAR	EUN	5.4 km	MPC; JPL
35976 Yorktown	1999 MY_{1}	Yorktown	June 25, 1999	Anderson Mesa	LONEOS	·	3.7 km	MPC; JPL
35977 Lexington	1999 NA	Lexington	July 3, 1999	Kleť	J. Tichá, M. Tichý	·	5.8 km	MPC; JPL
35978 Arlington	1999 NC	Arlington	July 5, 1999	Kleť	J. Tichá, M. Tichý	(2076)	3.4 km	MPC; JPL
35979	1999 NC_{2}	—	July 12, 1999	Socorro	LINEAR	·	7.3 km	MPC; JPL
35980	1999 NO_{3}	—	July 13, 1999	Socorro	LINEAR	·	4.0 km	MPC; JPL
35981	1999 NU_{3}	—	July 13, 1999	Socorro	LINEAR	EUN	4.0 km	MPC; JPL
35982	1999 NJ_{4}	—	July 11, 1999	Reedy Creek	J. Broughton	·	1.7 km	MPC; JPL
35983	1999 NG_{5}	—	July 15, 1999	Višnjan Observatory	K. Korlević	·	4.9 km	MPC; JPL
35984	1999 NK_{7}	—	July 13, 1999	Socorro	LINEAR	·	7.4 km	MPC; JPL
35985	1999 NJ_{8}	—	July 13, 1999	Socorro	LINEAR	GEF	4.1 km	MPC; JPL
35986	1999 NL_{8}	—	July 13, 1999	Socorro	LINEAR	·	6.9 km	MPC; JPL
35987	1999 NV_{8}	—	July 13, 1999	Socorro	LINEAR	·	3.3 km	MPC; JPL
35988	1999 NO_{9}	—	July 13, 1999	Socorro	LINEAR	·	9.0 km	MPC; JPL
35989	1999 NF_{10}	—	July 13, 1999	Socorro	LINEAR	2:1J	7.2 km	MPC; JPL
35990	1999 NG_{10}	—	July 13, 1999	Socorro	LINEAR	EUN	3.8 km	MPC; JPL
35991	1999 NN_{11}	—	July 13, 1999	Socorro	LINEAR	·	2.6 km	MPC; JPL
35992	1999 NF_{12}	—	July 13, 1999	Socorro	LINEAR	·	3.3 km	MPC; JPL
35993	1999 NS_{17}	—	July 14, 1999	Socorro	LINEAR	NYS	2.8 km	MPC; JPL
35994	1999 NS_{18}	—	July 14, 1999	Socorro	LINEAR	·	6.3 km	MPC; JPL
35995	1999 NK_{20}	—	July 14, 1999	Socorro	LINEAR	NYS	2.6 km	MPC; JPL
35996	1999 NN_{20}	—	July 14, 1999	Socorro	LINEAR	·	3.8 km	MPC; JPL
35997	1999 NQ_{20}	—	July 14, 1999	Socorro	LINEAR	LIX	8.4 km	MPC; JPL
35998	1999 NP_{21}	—	July 14, 1999	Socorro	LINEAR	V	3.0 km	MPC; JPL
35999	1999 NB_{22}	—	July 14, 1999	Socorro	LINEAR	GEF	3.5 km	MPC; JPL
36000	1999 NV_{22}	—	July 14, 1999	Socorro	LINEAR	(1338) (FLO)	2.4 km	MPC; JPL

back to top

== See also ==
- Meanings of minor-planet names: 35001–36000
