= Dubrovinskoye rural settlement =

Dubrovinskoye rural settlement Дубровинское сельское поселение
- Rural locality
- Location of Dubrovinskoye rural settlement
- Location of Dubrovinskoye rural settlement Dubrovinskoye rural settlement (Tyumen Oblast)
- Coordinates: 57.1751°N 66.5816°E
- Country: Russia
- Federal subject: Tyumen Oblast

Population (2010 Census)
  - Total: 1,918
- Time zone: UTC+5 (MSK+2)
- OKTMO ID: 71658415

Dubrovinskoye rural settlement — municipal settlement in Yarkovsky District in Tyumen Oblast. The structure of municipal settlement consists of five rural localities:

- Dubrovnoye selo,
- Motushy village,
- Kosmakovo village,
- Shchuchye village,
- Veselyj (rural-type) settlement.

Administrative centre — Dubrovnoye selo.

== Geography ==
Located on the Tura River, 64 km north of Tyumen. Near passes the Federal highway R404 from Tyumen to Khanty-Mansiysk.

The settlement is located on the territory of West Siberian Plain, in the Continental climate. Dominant winds — Southwest. The minimum air temperature in certain periods may fall to -50 °C (-58 °F), when the maximum may reach up to 36 °C (99 °F). Average annual precipitation is about 400 mm (15,7 ich). The number of days with snow cover is 164.

The main source of river flow is a snowmelt. Distribution of water within a year is uneven, which results a flooding over 60% of farmland and hayfields.

== History ==
=== Dubrovnoye selo ===
In 1763 on the left bank of the Tura River in the territory of the Pokrovskaya volost of the Tobolsk Governorate formed the Russian village Dubrovna. In 1903 the village belonged to the Sozonoskaya volost. By that time in the village were three shops, one chapel and one school. According to a local census in 1903 the village consisted of 88 yards, where lived 276 men and 299 women.

Grigori Rasputin, a trusted friend of last Tsar of the Russian Empire Nicholas II, often passed the Dubrovnoye. During the Civil War here took place the 51st Rifle Division of Vasily Blyukher.

According to Pavel Petrovich Popov, the Veteran of Labor of the Soviet Union, by that time there was one hundred twenty yards in Dubrovnoe. In 1928 Pavel Petrovich led the village Council and organised the first kolkhoz named "Red plowman". In 1931 other collective farms were organised: in Kosmakovo village — "Red dawn", in Shchuchye village — "May 1st", in Motushy village — "Paris commune".

In World War II around 180 people went to the front from Dubrovinckiy Council. Most of them did not return. During the first three years of the war the rest of the villagers produced 540, 486 and 394 workday on the fields and farms.

=== Motushy village ===
Until 1903 Tatar settlement on the Tura river was called Matushevskie yurts after the nearby lake. In 1903 there were 35 settlement houses, inhabited by 88 men and 80 women. There also were a mosque, a school and a steamship pier.

In July, 1919 the villagers witnessed the uprising on the Death barge. According to them, 2000 Red Army prisoners were shot as a result of the insurrection on the steamer "Irtysh". In 1968 cadets of "Tyumen College of water transport" established the memorial in memory of the rebels.

=== Kosmakovo village ===
Founded in the 17th century on shores of the Bagaryak lake. From archival documents it is known that in 1868 in Kosmakovo was 55 yards, where lived 240 men and 220 women. There was a bakery, one school, three shops and a chapel.

=== Shchuchye village ===
The village was founded in 1641 with the name Monastic. One version of the toponym origin is that only men lived here, forming the so-called monastery. Confirming this there was a special territorial dialect.

In 1868 the village had 69 yards, with a population of 605 inhabitants. By 1903 there already was 102 yards.

=== Veselyj settlement ===
The barrack-type village built in postwar years for deportation repressed peasants.

== Landmarks ==
In 1975, the 30th anniversary of the Victory over fascism in the center of the Dubrovnoe the monument were established.

Near the entrance to the Dubrovnoye village is a thermal spring called "Polyanka". According to Balneotherapy the water in the basin contains sodium chloride, bromine, boron, and its chemical composition is close to the water of Black Sea. The water temperature in the pool is 43 °C (109 °F).

== See also ==
- Administrative divisions of Tyumen Oblast
