= Yarkovo, Tyumen Oblast =

Rural locality in Tyumen Oblast, Russia

Coordinates: 57°24′05″N 67°04′29″E

Yarkovo (Russian: Ярково; Siberian Tatar: Йәшелтора) is a rural locality (a selo) and the administrative center of Yarkovsky District, Tyumen Oblast, Russia. Population: 7,017 (2010 census); 6,969 (2002 census); 5,626 (1989 Soviet census).
