= Cima Ekar Observing Station =

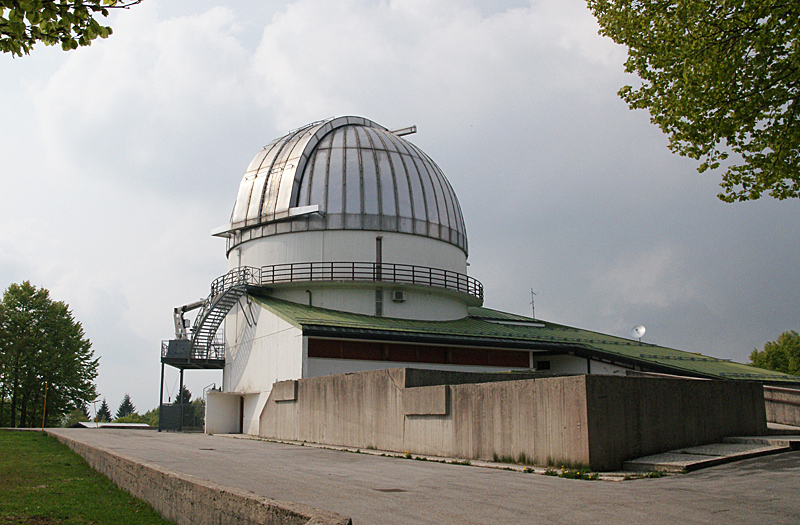
- Cima Ekar Observing Station in 2009
- Observatory code: 098
- Location: Asiago, Province of Vicenza, Veneto, Italy
- Coordinates: 45°51′N 11°34′E
- Altitude: 1,366 m (4,482 ft)
- Website: www.oapd.inaf.it/asiago/
- Related media on Commons

The Cima Ekar Observing Station (Italian: Stazione osservativa di Asiago Cima Ekar; obs. code: 098) is an astronomical observatory on the crest of Cima Ekar, a mountain ridge located approximately 4 kilometers southeast of and 350 m higher than the town of Asiago, Italy.

The Station is an annex to the nearby Asiago Astrophysical Observatory, also operated by the University of Padua. Cima Ekar hosts the 1966-built 67/92-cm Schmidt telescope and the 182-cm telescope dedicated to Nicholas Copernicus, the largest telescope in Italy.

== Asiago-DLR Asteroid Survey ==
Co-located at Cima Ekar is the Asiago-DLR Asteroid Survey (ADAS), IAU code 209. At Cima Ekar, Andrea Boattini, Flavio Castellani, Giuseppe Forti, Vittorio Goretti, Ulisse Munari, and Maura Tombelli have discovered a great number of asteroids.

== See also ==
- List of astronomical observatories
