= Ulisse Munari =

Italian astronomer

Minor planets discovered: 49
see § List of discovered minor planets

Ulisse Munari (born 1960) is an Italian astronomer and discoverer of minor planets. He is Professor of Astronomy at the University of Padua, and works at the Asiago Observatory. He is a member of the Radial Velocity Experiment (RAVE) team, an all-sky survey using the UK's 1.2m Schmidt telescope in Australia, as well as working with the planned GAIA mission.

== Awards and honors ==
The asteroid 7599 Munari is named after him. The official naming citation was published by the Minor Planet Center on 18 August 1997 (M.P.C. 30478).

== List of discovered minor planets ==
Ulisse Munari discovered several asteroids, all in collaboration with Maura Tombelli and Flavio Castellani.

7679 Asiago	15 February 1996	list^{[A]}
7715 Leonidarosino	14 February 1996	list^{[A]}
7794 Sanvito	15 January 1996	list^{[A]}
7847 Mattiaorsi	14 February 1996	list^{[A]}
7900 Portule	14 February 1996	list^{[A]}
8925 Boattini	4 December 1996	list^{[A]}
8944 Ortigara	30 January 1997	list^{[A]}
9425 Marconcini	14 February 1996	list^{[A]}
9426 Aliante	14 February 1996	list^{[A]}
9427 Righini	14 February 1996	list^{[A]}

9897 Malerba	14 February 1996	list^{[A]}
10176 Gaiavettori	14 February 1996	list^{[A]}
10198 Pinelli	6 December 1996	list^{[A]}
11348 Allegra	30 January 1997	list^{[A]}
12033 Anselmo	31 January 1997	list^{[A]}
12433 Barbieri	15 January 1996	list^{[A]}
12811 Rigonistern	14 February 1996	list^{[A]}
12812 Cioni	14 February 1996	list^{[A]}
12813 Paolapaolini	14 February 1996	list^{[A]}
12814 Vittorio	13 February 1996	list^{[A]}

13174 Timossi	14 February 1996	list^{[A]}
13638 Fiorenza	14 February 1996	list^{[A]}
14061 Nagincox	13 February 1996	list^{[A]}
14062 Cremaschini	14 February 1996	list^{[A]}
14947 Luigibussolino	15 January 1996	list^{[A]}
15005 Guerriero	7 December 1997	list^{[A]}
15375 Laetitiafoglia	30 January 1997	list^{[A]}
15853 Benedettafoglia	16 January 1996	list^{[A]}
15855 Mariasalvatore	14 February 1996	list^{[A]}
20195 Mariovinci	30 January 1997	list^{[A]}

23608 Alpiapuane	15 January 1996	list^{[A]}
24857 Sperello	15 January 1996	list^{[A]}
27094 Salgari	25 October 1998	list^{[B]}
27095 Girardiwanda	25 October 1998	list^{[B]}
27923 Dimitribartolini	4 December 1996	list^{[A]}
29363 Ghigabartolini	14 February 1996	list^{[A]}
(29547) 1998 BA_{34}	25 January 1998	list^{[A]}
31091 Bettiventicinque	30 January 1997	list^{[A]}
35444 Giuliamarconcini	25 January 1998	list^{[A]}
35465 Emilianoricci	27 February 1998	list^{[A]}

37835 Darioconsigli	25 January 1998	list^{[A]}
37836 Simoneterreni	25 January 1998	list^{[A]}
42775 Bianchini	26 October 1998	list^{[B]}
43923 Cosimonoccioli	14 February 1996	list^{[A]}
(46701) 1997 CP_{29}	7 February 1997	list^{[A]}
85368 Elisabettacioni	14 February 1996	list^{[A]}
85515 Annakukharskaya	26 October 1997	list^{[A]}
118233 Gfrancoferrini	30 January 1997	list^{[A]}
136848 Kevanpooler	25 January 1998	list^{[A]}
Co-discovery made with:^{A} M. Tombelli and/or ^{B} F. Castellani

== See also ==
- List of minor planet discoverers § U. Munari
