= Yarkovsky District =

Yarkovsky District Ярковский район (Russian)
- District
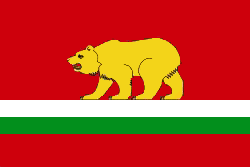
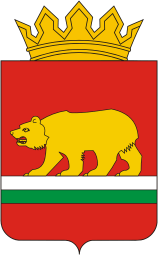
- Flag Coat of arms
- Location of Yarkovsky District in Tyumen Oblast
- Coordinates: 57°24′N 67°06′E
- Country: Russia
- Federal subject: Tyumen Oblast
- Established: 17 June 1925
- Administrative center: Yarkovo

Area
  - Total: 6,656 km^{2} (2,570 sq mi)

Population (2010 Census)
  - Total: 23,184
  - Density: 3.483/km^{2} (9.021/sq mi)
  - Urban: 0%
  - Rural: 100%

Administrative structure
  - Administrative divisions: 14 Rural okrugs
  - Inhabited localities: 73 rural localities

Municipal structure
  - Municipally incorporated as: Yarkovsky Municipal District
  - Municipal divisions: 0 urban settlements, 14 rural settlements
- Time zone: UTC+5 (MSK+2)
- OKTMO ID: 71658000

Yarkovsky District (Russian: Ярко́вский райо́н) is one of the 22 administrative divisions of Tyumen Oblast, Russia. As a municipal division, it is incorporated as Yarkovsky Municipal District. It is located in the western central part of the oblast. The area of the district is 6,656 square kilometers (2,570 sq mi).

Its administrative center is the rural locality of Yarkovo. Population: 23,184 (2010 Census); 25,074 (2002 census); 26,418 (1989 Soviet census). The population of Yarkovo accounts for 30.3% of the district's total population.

== See also ==
- Dubrovinskoye rural settlement
