= Meanings of minor-planet names: 27001–28000 =

As minor planet discoveries are confirmed, they are given a permanent number by the IAU's Minor Planet Center (MPC), and the discoverers can then submit names for them, following the IAU's naming conventions. The list below concerns those minor planets in the specified number-range that have received names, and explains the meanings of those names.

Official naming citations of newly named small Solar System bodies are approved and published in a bulletin by IAU's Working Group for Small Bodies Nomenclature (WGSBN). Before May 2021, citations were published in MPC's Minor Planet Circulars for many decades. Recent citations can also be found on the JPL Small-Body Database (SBDB). Until his death in 2016, German astronomer Lutz D. Schmadel compiled these citations into the Dictionary of Minor Planet Names (DMP) and regularly updated the collection.

Based on Paul Herget's The Names of the Minor Planets, Schmadel also researched the unclear origin of numerous asteroids, most of which had been named prior to World War II. This article incorporates text from this source, which is in the public domain: SBDB New namings may only be added to this list below after official publication as the preannouncement of names is condemned. The WGSBN publishes a comprehensive guideline for the naming rules of non-cometary small Solar System bodies.

== 27001–27100 ==
Named minor planet	Provisional	This minor planet was named for...	Ref · Catalog
27003 Katoizumi	1998 DB_{13}	Izumi Kato (born 1968) is a Japanese singer. Since her debut in 1991, she has released 15 singles, including her greatest hit, Sukini Natte Yokatta, and 12 albums. Her touching ballads, often called "healing pops", have fascinated her many fans in Japan.	JPL · 27003
27004 Violetaparra	1998 DP_{23}	Violeta Parra (1917–1967), was a well-known Chilean artist and folk singer.	JPL · 27004
27005 Dariaguidetti	1998 DR_{35}	Daria Guidetti (born 1978), Italian astrophysicist and science communicator, has made major research contributions to the field of extragalactic radioastronomy. She is an author and a presenter of the national TV program Cosmo, about astronomy and space exploration.	IAU · 27005
27023 Juuliamoreau	1998 QE_{54}	Juulia-Gabrielle Moreau (born 1984) is a postdoctoral researcher at the University of Helsinki (Finland) whose studies include numerical modeling of asteroid collisions and shock effects in meteorites.	IAU · 27023
27032 Veazey	1998 RQ_{5}	Sally O. Veazey (born 1939) is a member of Lowell Observatory's advisory board. Sally shares her time and talent with Lowell Observatory by volunteering when needed. Sally is retired and spends her time working with the Women's Assistance League managing their thrift shop.	JPL · 27032
27047 Boisvert	1998 RA_{80}	Scott Paul Boisvert (born 1993) was a finalist in the 2011 Intel Science Talent Search and was also awarded second place in the 2010 Intel International Science and Engineering Fair, for his environmental-science project. He attends the Basha High School, Chandler, Arizona, U.S.	JPL · 27047
27048 Jangong	1998 RO_{80}	Jan Jiawei Gong (born 1993) was a finalist in the 2011 Intel Science Talent Search and was also awarded first place in the 2010 Intel International Science and Engineering Fair. She attends the Garden City Senior High School, Garden City, New York, U.S.	JPL · 27048
27049 Kraus	1998 SB_{3}	Adam Levi Kraus (born 1980), American astronomer. He has developed a data-processing pipeline for the Moving Object and Transient Event Search System (MOTESS) survey instrument that has revealed thousands of new variable stars and transient events. His skillfully implemented algorithms have greatly speeded the examination of hundreds of gigabytes of imagery data.	JPL · 27049
27050 Beresheet	1998 SW_{4}	The Beresheet spacecraft was the first Israeli-built mission to go to the Moon. Beresheet entered Lunar Orbit on April 4, 2019, but ended its mission one week later with an unsuccessful landing attempt.	IAU · 27050
27052 Katebush	1998 SN_{13}	Kate Bush (born 1958) is a singer/songwriter/performance artist who has a haunting voice and presence when she performs.	JPL · 27052
27054 Williamgoddard	1998 SA_{25}	William H. Goddard (born 1942) is a member of Lowell Observatory's advisory board. He serves on Lowell's Investment Committee and has been a long-time member and Friend of Lowell Observatory.	IAU · 27054
27056 Ginoloria	1998 SB_{28}	Gino Loria (1862–1954), Italian mathematician and historian of mathematics	JPL · 27056
27061 Wong	1998 SW_{53}	Curtis G. Wong (born 1954) is a member of Lowell Observatory's advisory board. Curtis gives his time and talent helping Lowell Observatory fulfill its mission. He supports Lowell's educational programs.	IAU · 27061
27062 Brookeminer	1998 SJ_{58}	Brooke Miner (born 1941) is an astrophysicist and a member of Lowell Observatory's advisory board sharing her time and talent. She is a member of Lowell's Technology Committee.	JPL · 27062
27063 Richardmontano	1998 SY_{60}	Richard Montano (born 1995) is a Visitor Experience Lead for Lowell Observatory. He is a shift lead for the Starry Skies Shop and ticketing desks. Richard helps manage product receiving and inventory control.	IAU · 27063
27071 Rangwala	1998 SA_{109}	Alydaar Rangwala (born 1993) was a finalist in the 2011 Intel Science Talent Search and was also awarded second place in the 2010 Intel International Science and Engineering Fair for his biochemistry project. He attends the Albany Academies, Albany, New York, U.S.	JPL · 27071
27072 Aggarwal	1998 SS_{117}	Amol Aggarwal (born 1993) was a finalist in the 2011 Intel Science Talent Search, a science competition for high-school seniors, for his mathematical sciences project. He attends the Saratoga High School, Saratoga, California, U.S.	JPL · 27072
27074 Etatolia	1998 SS_{132}	Eta Atolia (born 1993) was a finalist in the 2010 Intel Science Talent Search, a science competition for high-school seniors, for her biochemistry project. She attends the Rickards High School, Tallahassee, Florida, U.S.	JPL · 27074
27079 Vsetín	1998 TO_{6}	The Czech town of Vsetín. It is located in the Valašsko (Wallachia) region of eastern Moravia. A public observatory founded there in 1950 concentrates on astronomical popularization and education, especially involving young people.	JPL · 27079
27082 Donaldson-Hanna	1998 TT_{30}	Kerri Donaldson-Hanna (born 1976) is a planetary geologist and assistant professor in the Department of Physics at the University of Central Florida (Orlando, FL). She focuses on understanding the formation and evolution of airless bodies like the Moon, Mercury, Mars' moons, and asteroids.	IAU · 27082
27083 Alethialittle	1998 TG_{32}	Alethia Little (born 1987) is the Multi-Cultural Outreach Facilitator at Lowell Observatory and educator/manager for the Native American Astronomy Outreach Program (NAAOP). She draws on her Navajo background to initiate and run NAAOP's book club, role models, summer and winter camps, and other innovations.	IAU · 27083
27084 Heidilarson	1998 TD_{33}	Heidi Larson (born 1986) is the Telescope Support Specialist at Lowell Observatory. She plays a major role in maintaining the performance of the Navy Precision Optical Interferometer. During her time at Lowell, she has filled roles as a Telescope Operator at the Lowell Discovery Telescope as well as in the public programs engaging with visitors.	IAU · 27084
27086 Italicobrass	1998 UX_{6}	Italico Brass (1870–1943), an Italian painter and art collector.	IAU · 27086
27087 Tillmannmohr	1998 UA_{15}	Tillmann Mohr (born 1940), former president of the German Meteorological Service and director of EUMETSAT until 2004. He played an important role in the ESA project which led to the Meteosat system and has been associated with EUMETSAT from when it was first conceived by European meteorologists.	MPC · 27087
27088 Valmez	1998 UC_{15}	The Czech town of Valašské Meziříčí. It is located in the Valašsko (Wallachia) region of eastern Moravia and was first mentioned as a settlement in 1297. A small private observatory founded there in 1929 was precursor to a major public observatory in 1955 that is well known for its architectural beauty.	MPC · 27088
27091 Alisonbick	1998 UY_{21}	Alison Dana Bick (born 1993) was a finalist in the 2010 Intel Science Talent Search, a science competition for high-school seniors, for her materials and bioengineering project. She attends the Millburn High School, Millburn, New Jersey, U.S.	JPL · 27091
27094 Salgari	1998 UC_{23}	Emilio Salgari (1862–1911), Italian writer of action adventure. His works have nourished the fantasy of many generations, was born in Verona and died in Torino. The father of Sandokan and Black Corsair, he wrote 82 novels and hundreds of short stories, translated into many languages all over the world.	JPL · 27094
27095 Girardiwanda	1998 UE_{23}	Girardi Wanda (born 1931) an Italian poet and journalist from Verona. She published eight collections of poems and is represented in four anthologies. As a journalist she published more than 400 articles on culture and history. She won 61 poetry contests and was honored in another 160.	JPL · 27095
27096 Jelenalane	1998 UL_{24}	Jelena Lane (born 1993), Event Coordinator at Lowell Observatory, brings the outreach programs to under served groups in the community. She organizes special events that involve partnerships with local businesses and facilitates the rental of venues for science conferences and other functions.	IAU · 27096
27098 Bocarsly	1998 UC_{41}	Joshua David Bocarsly (born 1992) was a finalist in the 2010 Intel Science Talent Search, a science competition for high-school seniors, for his materials science project. He attends the Lawrenceville School, Lawrenceville, New Jersey, U.S.	JPL · 27098
27099 Xiaoyucao	1998 UJ_{43}	Xiaoyu Cao (born 1993) was a finalist in the 2010 Intel Science Talent Search, a science competition for high-school seniors, for her chemistry project. She attends the Torrey Pines High School, San Diego, California, U.S.	JPL · 27099

== 27101–27200 ==
back to top

Named minor planet	Provisional	This minor planet was named for...	Ref · Catalog
27101 Wenyucao	1998 VK_{7}	Wenyu Cao (born 1993) was a finalist in the 2010 Intel Science Talent Search, a science competition for high-school seniors, for his mathematical-sciences project. He attends the Phillips Academy, Andover, Massachusetts, U.S.	JPL · 27101
27102 Emilychen	1998 VV_{7}	Emily Li Chen (born 1993) was a finalist in the 2010 Intel Science Talent Search, a science competition for high-school seniors, for her microbiology project. She attends the Brownell-Talbot High School, Omaha, Nebraska, U.S.	JPL · 27102
27103 Sungwoncho	1998 VB_{15}	Sung Won Cho (born 1992) was a finalist in the 2010 Intel Science Talent Search, a science competition for high-school seniors, for his animal-sciences project. He attends the Groton School, Groton, Massachusetts, U.S.	JPL · 27103
27105 Clarkben	1998 VB_{20}	Benjamin Mathias Clark (born 1995) was a finalist in the 2010 Intel Science Talent Search, a science competition for high-school seniors, for his physics project. He attends the Penn Manor High School, Millersville, Pennsylvania, U.S.	JPL · 27105
27106 Jongoldman	1998 VV_{29}	Jonathan Aaron Goldman (born 1993) was a finalist in the 2010 Intel Science Talent Search, a science competition for high-school seniors, for his behavioral- and social-sciences project. He attends the Plainview-Old Bethpage John F. Kennedy High School, Plainview, New York, U.S.	JPL · 27106
27107 Michelleabi	1998 VB_{30}	Michelle Abi Hackman (born 1993) was a finalist in the 2010 Intel Science Talent Search, a science competition for high-school seniors, for her behavioral- and social-sciences project. She attends the John Miller Great Neck North High School, Great Neck, New York, U.S.	JPL · 27107
27108 Bryanhe	1998 VM_{30}	Bryan Dawei He (born 1994) was a finalist in the 2010 Intel Science Talent Search, a science competition for high-school seniors, for his computer-science project. He attends the Williamsville High School East, East Amherst, New York, U.S.	JPL · 27108
27110 Annemaryvonne	1998 VX_{33}	Anne Marie Yvonne Maury Van Der Donckt (born 1965), the sister of one of the uncredited ODAS-discoverers (presumably French astronomer Alain Maury).	JPL · 27110
27114 Lukasiewicz	1998 WG_{2}	Jan Łukasiewicz (1878–1956), Polish mathematician and logician, inventor of "reverse Polish notation"	JPL · 27114
27120 Isabelhawkins	1998 WV_{8}	Isabel Hawkins (born 1958), Argentine-American astrochemist and director of the Center for Science Education at the University of California Berkeley Space Sciences Laboratory. She works on chemical abundances of the interstellar medium. She is also involved in education initiatives, including Project FIRST (Fostering Reading Through Science and Technology).	JPL · 27120
27121 Joardar	1998 WV_{10}	Rounok Joardar (born 1994) was a finalist in the 2010 Intel Science Talent Search, a science competition for high-school seniors, for his materials and bioengineering project. He attends the Plano West Senior High School, Plano, Texas, U.S.	JPL · 27121
27123 Matthewlam	1998 WM_{14}	Matthew Lam (born 1993) was a finalist in the 2010 Intel Science Talent Search, a science competition for high-school seniors, for his behavioral- and social-sciences project. He attends the Jericho Senior High School, Jericho, New York, U.S.	JPL · 27123
27125 Siyilee	1998 WZ_{20}	Si-Yi Ryan Lee (born 1992) was a finalist in the 2010 Intel Science Talent Search, a science competition for high-school seniors, for his biochemistry project. He attends the North Carolina School Of Science And Mathematics, Durham, North Carolina, U.S.	JPL · 27125
27126 Bonnielei	1998 WG_{23}	Bonnie Rae Lei (born 1993) was a finalist in the 2010 Intel Science Talent Search, a science competition for high-school seniors, for her animal-sciences project. She attends the Walnut High School, Walnut, California, U.S.	JPL · 27126
27130 Dipaola	1998 XA_{3}	Andrea Di Paola (born 1970), an Italian astronomer, discoverer of minor planets and staff member at the Rome Astronomical Observatory. He has the scientific and technical responsibility for the Campo Imperatore Observatory. He has been involved with instrumentation and software at the CINEOS project for near-Earth asteroid discovery at Campo Imperatore since 1996.	MPC · 27130
27132 Ježek	1998 XJ_{9}	Jaroslav Ježek (1906–1942), a Czech composer who conducted the orchestra Osvobozené divadlo ("Liberated Theatre"), Prague, during 1928–1938. He composed jazz and dance music, as well as chamber and orchestral music. His songs for plays written by Voskovec and Werich are famous. He died while emigrating to New York.	MPC · 27132
27141 Krystleleung	1998 XT_{52}	Krystle M. Leung (born 1993) was a finalist in the 2010 Intel Science Talent Search, a science competition for high-school seniors, for her environmental-science project. She attends the Naperville Central High School, Naperville, Illinois, U.S.	JPL · 27141
27147 Mercedessosa	1998 YE_{2}	Mercedes Sosa (1935–2009) was an Argentinian popular singer, also known as La Negra by her fans. She renewed South American folk music, interpreting, among others, songs from Atahualpa Yupanqui and Violetta Parra. She was a goodwill ambassador for UNESCO in South America and the Caribbean	JPL · 27147
27150 Annasante	1998 YQ_{3}	Anna Mazzi and Sante Colombini, parents of Italian amateur astronomer Ermes Colombini who has co-discovered this minor planet.	JPL · 27150
27158 Benedetti-Rossi	1998 YZ_{29}	Gustavo Benedetti-Rossi (born 1985) is a postdoctoral associate at the Paris Observatory (Meudon, France). His studies include Pluto, trans-Neptunian objects, centaurs, and studying small-body rings through stellar occultations.	IAU · 27158
27169 Annelabruzzo	1999 AS_{23}	Anne LaBruzzo (born 1960) is the deputy director for Administration at Lowell Observatory. She manages the Observatory's business office and all of its financial matters, which include numerous federal grants and contracts as well as an operating budget that nearly tripled between 2010 and 2020.	IAU · 27169
27172 Brucekosaveach	1999 AN_{34}	Bruce Kosaveach (born 1949) is a Philanthropy Manager for Lowell Observatory responsible for raising funds for astronomy research, educational activities, capital building projects, and general support. He is also a former volunteer Lowell Observatory Foundation Trustee.	IAU · 27172
27178 Quino	1999 BT_{6}	Quino (or Joaquin Salvador Lavado Tejon, 1932–2020), known as Quino, an Argentinian cartoonist.	JPL · 27178
27182 Korinotenmondai	1999 CL_{3}	Korinotenmondai is the Japanese name for the Korino Observatory in Minamisatsuma City, Kagoshima Prefecture, Japan.	IAU · 27182
27184 Ciabattari	1999 CX_{4}	Fabrizio Ciabattari (born 1970), an Italian amateur astronomer who has been Director of the Astronomical Observatory of Monte Agliale (159) for more than 10 years. He is a math teacher and brilliant popularizer of science. He has created a program to automate the telescope of the observatory, allowing the discovery of many supernovae.	JPL · 27184
27192 Selenali	1999 CR_{59}	Selena Shi-Yao Li (born 1993) was a finalist in the 2010 Intel Science Talent Search, a science competition for high-school seniors, for her biochemistry project. She attends the Mira Loma High School, Sacramento, California, U.S.	JPL · 27192
27194 Jonathanli	1999 CF_{60}	Jonathan F. Li (born 1993) was a finalist in the 2010 Intel Science Talent Search, a science competition for high-school seniors, for his bioinformatics and genomics project. He attends the Saint Margaret's Episcopal School, San Juan Capistrano, California, U.S.	JPL · 27194
27197 Andrewliu	1999 CW_{65}	Andrew Bo Liu (born 1994) was a finalist in the 2010 Intel Science Talent Search, a science competition for high-school seniors, for his bioinformatics and genomics project. He attends the Henry M. Gunn Senior High School, Palo Alto, California, U.S.	JPL · 27197

== 27201–27300 ==
back to top

Named minor planet	Provisional	This minor planet was named for...	Ref · Catalog
27208 Jennyliu	1999 CF_{104}	Jenny Jiaqi Liu (born 1993) was a finalist in the 2010 Intel Science Talent Search, a science competition for high-school seniors, for her computer-science project. She attends the Amity Regional High School, Woodbridge, Connecticut, U.S.	JPL · 27208
27217 Mattieharrington	1999 CC_{154}	Mattie Harrington (born 1964) is Lowell Observatory's Executive Assistant to the Sole Trustee, the Director, and the development team. She also oversees the donor stewardship program, manages donor events, and assists with grant writing. She previously served as Science Staff Assistant.	IAU · 27217
27224 Telus	1999 GC_{9}	Myriam Telus (born 1988) is a meteorite researcher and professor at the University of California Santa Cruz studying planetesimal formation and evolution. Her specialty is geochemical studies of short-lived radionuclides and fluid flow via laboratory measurements of chondritic meteorites.	IAU · 27224
27227 McAdam	1999 GB_{48}	Maggie M. McAdam (born 1987) is a postdoctoral research fellow at Northern Arizona University and is an expert in hydrated asteroids.	IAU · 27227
27233 Mahajan	1999 NP_{8}	Rohan Mahajan (born 1993) was a finalist in the 2010 Intel Science Talent Search, a science competition for high-school seniors, for his materials-science project. He attends the Harker School, San Jose, California, U.S.	JPL · 27233
27234 Timdodd	1999 RC_{2}	Timothy Justin Dodd (born 1985), American science communicator, photographer and musician.	JPL · 27234
27236 Millermatt	1999 RU_{96}	Matthew Miller (born 1992) was a finalist in the 2010 Intel Science Talent Search, a science competition for high-school seniors, for his materials and bioengineering project. He attends the Western Alamance High School, Elon, North Carolina, U.S.	JPL · 27236
27238 Keenanmonks	1999 RL_{173}	Keenan Monks (born 1993) was a finalist in the 2010 Intel Science Talent Search, a science competition for high-school seniors, for his mathematical-sciences project. He attends the Hazleton Area High School, Hazleton, Pennsylvania, U.S.	JPL · 27238
27239 O'Dorney	1999 RW_{211}	Evan Michael O'Dorney (born 1993) was a finalist in the 2010 Intel Science Talent Search, a science competition for high-school seniors, for his mathematical-sciences project. He attends the Venture School, San Ramon, California, U.S.	JPL · 27239
27240 Robhall	1999 TR_{36}	Rob Hall (born 1994) is a Visitor Experience Lead for Lowell Observatory. He is a shift lead for the Starry Skies Shop and ticketing desks. Rob helps train people and maintain our point of sale and ticketing software and also helps with reporting.	IAU · 27240
27241 Sunilpai	1999 TP_{93}	Sunil Kochikar Pai (born 1993) was a finalist in the 2010 Intel Science Talent Search, a science competition for high-school seniors, for his chemistry project. He attends the Kinkaid School, Houston, Texas, U.S.	JPL · 27241
27244 Parthasarathy	1999 VA_{34}	Nikhil Parthasarathy (born 1993) was a finalist in the 2010 Intel Science Talent Search, a science competition for high-school seniors, for his physics project. He attends the Harker School, San Jose, California, U.S.	JPL · 27244
27248 Schristensen	1999 VN_{210}	Samantha Christensen (born 1982) is the deputy director for Education at Lowell Observatory. She oversees all of Lowell's outreach programs with over 100 000 visitors each year. She is also one of the leaders in the design and development of Lowell's upcoming Astronomy Discovery Center.	IAU · 27248
27253 Graceleanor	1999 XC_{28}	Grace Eleanor Phillips (born 1993) was a finalist in the 2010 Intel Science Talent Search, a science competition for high-school seniors, for her plant-sciences project. She attends the Mamaroneck High School, Mamaroneck, New York, U.S.	JPL · 27253
27254 Shubhrosaha	1999 XZ_{29}	Shubhro Saha (born 1993) was a finalist in the 2010 Intel Science Talent Search, a science competition for high-school seniors, for his chemistry project. He attends the Choate Rosemary Hall, Wallingford, Connecticut, U.S.	JPL · 27254
27257 Tang-Quan	1999 XG_{34}	David Kenneth Tang-Quan (born 1992) was a finalist in the 2010 Intel Science Talent Search, a science competition for high-school seniors, for his microbiology project. He attends the Palos Verdes Peninsula High School, Rolling Hills Estates, California, U.S.	JPL · 27257
27258 Chelseavoss	1999 XF_{49}	Chelsea Sierra Voss (born 1994) was a finalist in the 2010 Intel Science Talent Search, a science competition for high-school seniors, for her bioinformatics and genomics project. She attends the Cupertino High School, Cupertino, California, U.S.	JPL · 27258
27261 Yushiwang	1999 XS_{165}	Yushi Wang (born 1993) was a finalist in the 2010 Intel Science Talent Search, a science competition for high-school seniors, for his computer-science project. He attends the Sunset High School, Portland, Oregon, U.S.	JPL · 27261
27263 Elainezhou	1999 XA_{193}	Elaine Zhou (born 1993) was a finalist in the 2010 Intel Science Talent Search, a science competition for high-school seniors, for her chemistry project. She attends the Lake Highland Prep School, Orlando, Florida, U.S.	JPL · 27263
27264 Frankclayton	1999 XQ_{205}	Frank Clayton Anderson III, mentored a finalist in the 2011 Intel Science Talent Search, a science competition for high-school seniors. He teaches at the Kinkaid School, Houston, Texas, U.S.	JPL · 27264
27265 Toddgonzales	1999 XV_{233}	Todd Gonzales (born 1979) is Education Manager at Lowell Observatory. He oversees the development of many of the Observatory's educational programs, particularly those geared toward children. He previously served as Public Program Supervisor and Philanthropy Ambassador.	IAU · 27265
27267 Wiberg	1999 YH_{7}	Kenneth B. Wiberg (born 1927), American chemist and the Ph.D. advisor of John V. McClusky who has discovered this minor planet. Wiberg has made many important contributions to the areas of spectroscopy, organic chemistry and computational chemistry while on the faculties of the University of Washington (1950–1962) and Yale University (since 1962).	JPL · 27267
27269 Albinocarbognani	2000 AB_{3}	Albino Carbognani (born 1965) has worked extensively on astrometric and photometric observations of near-Earth, main-belt, Trojans and TNO asteroids. He currently works on fireballs and a space surveillance project about artificial satellites, spaces debris and near-Earth asteroids with optical observations from the ground.	IAU · 27269
27270 Guidotti	2000 AY_{4}	Guido Guidotti (born 1946), Italian amateur astronomer and founder of the amateur astronomer association Valdinievole "A. Pieri" (Italian: Associazione Astrofili Valdinievole "A. Pieri") Src	MPC · 27270
27276 Davidblack	2000 AC_{54}	David H. Black Jr., mentored a finalist in the 2011 Intel Science Talent Search, a science competition for high-school seniors. He teaches at the Groton School, Groton, Massachusetts, U.S.	JPL · 27276
27277 Pattybrown	2000 AY_{55}	Patricia Brown mentored a finalist in the 2011 Intel Science Talent Search, a science competition for high-school seniors. She teaches at the Brownell-Talbot High School, Omaha, Nebraska, U.S.	JPL · 27277
27279 Boburan	2000 AW_{62}	David (Bo) Buran mentored a finalist in the 2011 Intel Science Talent Search, a science competition for high-school seniors. He teaches at the Albany Academies, Albany, New York, U.S.	JPL · 27279
27280 Manettedavies	2000 AJ_{65}	Manette Davies mentored a finalist in the 2011 Intel Science Talent Search, a science competition for high-school seniors. She teaches at the Walnut High School, Walnut, California, U.S.	JPL · 27280
27282 Deborahday	2000 AX_{91}	Deborah Day mentored a finalist in the 2011 Intel Science Talent Search (STS), a science competition for high-school seniors. She teaches at the Amity Regional High School, Woodbridge, Connecticut, U.S.	JPL · 27282
27284 Billdunbar	2000 AJ_{97}	Bill Dunbar mentored a finalist in the 2011 Intel Science Talent Search (STS), a science competition for high-school seniors. He teaches at the Henry M. Gunn Senior High School, Palo Alto, California, U.S.	JPL · 27284
27286 Adedmondson	2000 AL_{111}	Adam Edmondson mentored a finalist in the 2011 Intel Science Talent Search, a science competition for high-school seniors. He teaches at the Hazleton Area High School, Hazleton, Pennsylvania, U.S.	JPL · 27286
27287 Garbarino	2000 AC_{112}	Guido Garbarino mentored a finalist in the 2011 Intel Science Talent Search, a science competition for high-school seniors. He teaches at the Mamaroneck High School, Mamaroneck, New York, U.S.	JPL · 27287
27288 Paulgilmore	2000 AQ_{125}	Paul Gilmore mentored a finalist in the 2011 Intel Science Talent Search, a science competition for high-school seniors. He teaches at the Millburn High School, Millburn, New Jersey, U.S.	JPL · 27288
27289 Myrahalpin	2000 AF_{126}	Myra Halpin mentored a finalist in the 2011 Intel Science Talent Search (STS), a science competition for high-school seniors. She teaches at the North Carolina School Of Science And Mathematics, Durham, North Carolina, U.S.	JPL · 27289
27291 Greghansen	2000 AV_{129}	Gregory A. Hansen mentored a finalist in the 2011 Intel Science Talent Search, a science competition for high-school seniors. He teaches at the Lawrenceville School, Lawrenceville, New Jersey, U.S.	JPL · 27291
27296 Kathyhurd	2000 AO_{144}	Kathy Hurd mentored a finalist in the 2011 Intel Science Talent Search (STS), a science competition for high-school seniors. She teaches at the Naperville Central High School, Naperville, Illinois, U.S.	JPL · 27296

== 27301–27400 ==
back to top

Named minor planet	Provisional	This minor planet was named for...	Ref · Catalog
27301 Joeingalls	2000 AT_{168}	Joseph Ingalls mentored a finalist in the 2011 Intel Science Talent Search, a science competition for high-school seniors. He teaches at the Saint Margaret's Episcopal School, San Juan Capistrano, California, U.S.	JPL · 27301
27302 Jeankobis	2000 AA_{171}	Jean A. Kobis mentored a finalist in the 2011 Intel Science Talent Search, a science competition for high-school seniors. She teaches at the Williamsville High School East, East Amherst, New York, U.S.	JPL · 27302
27303 Leitner	2000 AT_{180}	Roxanne Leitner mentored a finalist in the 2011 Intel Science Talent Search, a science competition for high-school seniors. She teaches at the Ursuline Academy Of Dallas, Dallas, Texas, U.S.	JPL · 27303
27309 Serenamccalla	2000 AC_{233}	Serena McCalla mentored a finalist in the 2011 Intel Science Talent Search, a science competition for high-school seniors. She teaches at the Jericho Senior High School, Jericho, New York, U.S.	JPL · 27309
27311 Shannongonzales	2000 AO_{237}	Shannon Gonzales (born 1989) is the Membership and Database Manager for Lowell Observatory. She oversees the membership program in addition to managing the Observatory's donor database system and gift processing department. She previously served as a Retail Associate and as a Development Assistant.	IAU · 27311
27312 Sconantgilbert	2000 AD_{240}	Sarah Conant Gilbert (born 1989) is the Senior Creative Specialist for Lowell Observatory and has been instrumental in promoting the scientific research and public outreach of the Observatory in print and digital media, as well as defining and updating its brand identity.	IAU · 27312
27314 Janemcdonald	2000 AG_{247}	Jane McDonald mentored a finalist in the 2011 Intel Science Talent Search, a science competition for high-school seniors. She teaches at the Rickards High School, Tallahassee, Florida, U.S.	JPL · 27314
27320 Vellinga	2000 BF_{23}	Joseph Vellinga (born 1938), the Flight System Manager for the OSIRIS-REx asteroid sample-return mission. He was also the Systems Engineer and Program Manager for the Hubble Space Telescope Faint Object Spectrograph, the Genesis sample-return mission, and the Stardust sample-return mission.	JPL · 27320
27323 Julianewman	2000 CG_{25}	Julia Newman mentored a finalist in the 2011 Intel Science Talent Search, a science competition for high-school seniors. She teaches at the Torrey Pines High School, San Diego, California, U.S.	JPL · 27323
27326 Jimobrien	2000 CC_{37}	James O'Brien mentored a finalist in the 2011 Intel Science Talent Search, a science competition for high-school seniors. He teaches at the Venture School, San Ramon, California, U.S.	JPL · 27326
27327 Lindaplante	2000 CW_{37}	Linda Plante mentored a finalist in the 2011 Intel Science Talent Search, a science competition for high-school seniors. She teaches at the Woodbury High School, Woodbury, Minnesota, U.S.	JPL · 27327
27328 Pohlonski	2000 CW_{45}	Emily Parker Pohlonski mentored a finalist in the 2011 Intel Science Talent Search, a science competition for high-school seniors. She teaches at the Novi High School, Novi, Michigan, U.S.	JPL · 27328
27330 Markporter	2000 CY_{52}	Mark Porter mentored a finalist in the 2011 Intel Science Talent Search (STS), a science competition for high-school seniors. He teaches at the Mira Loma High School, Sacramento, California, U.S.	JPL · 27330
27332 Happritchard	2000 CE_{63}	Parmely Hap Pritchard mentored a finalist in the 2011 Intel Science Talent Search, a science competition for high-school seniors. He teaches at the Oregon Episcopal School, Portland, Oregon, U.S.	JPL · 27332
27336 Mikequinn	2000 CZ_{88}	Mike Quinn mentored a finalist in the 2011 Intel Science Talent Search (STS), a science competition for high-school seniors. He teaches at the Sunset High School, Portland, Oregon, U.S.	JPL · 27336
27338 Malaraghavan	2000 CD_{93}	Mala Raghavan mentored a finalist in the 2011 Intel Science Talent Search, a science competition for high-school seniors. She teaches at the Harker School, San Jose, California, U.S.	JPL · 27338
27341 Fabiomuzzi	2000 CK_{97}	Fabio Muzzi (1962–2006), an Italian amateur astronomer who graduated in astronomy from the University of Bologna, was an employee of the Italian National Institute of Social Security. As an amateur astronomer, he collaborated with the Osservatorio San Vittore measuring several positions of minor planets, principally near-earth objects.	JPL · 27341
27342 Joescanio	2000 CB_{102}	Joseph M. V. Scanio mentored a finalist in the 2011 Intel Science Talent Search, a science competition for high-school seniors. He teaches at the Choate Rosemary Hall, Wallingford, Connecticut, U.S.	JPL · 27342
27343 Deannashea	2000 CT_{102}	Deanna Shea mentored a finalist in the 2011 Intel Science Talent Search (STS), a science competition for high-school seniors. She teaches at the Shepton High School, Plano, Texas, U.S.	JPL · 27343
27344 Vesevlada	2000 DM_{2}	Vladimír Veselý (born 1933), Czech researcher in apiculture, who was the director of the Bee Research Institute at Dol from 1970 to 1997. He has gained recognition for the spreading of the docile Carnica bee in the Czech Republic and for the control of the bee disease Varroa mite through the development of medicines and a national organization.	MPC · 27344
27347 Dworkin	2000 DN_{14}	Jason Dworkin (born 1969), the Project Scientist for the OSIRIS-REx asteroid sample-return mission. He also leads the contamination control team for OSIRIS-REx. He is a distinguished astrochemist known for his work on characterizing prebiotic molecules from primitive meteorites.	JPL · 27347
27348 Mink	2000 DX_{14}	Ronald Mink (born 1970), the Deputy Project Systems Engineer for the OSIRIS-REx asteroid sample-return mission. He leads the design effort and detailed planning for spacecraft proximity operations around the asteroid. He also served as an Optical Engineer for NIRSpec on the James Webb Space Telescope.	JPL · 27348
27349 Enos	2000 DS_{15}	Heather Enos (born 1968), the Project Planning and Control Officer for the OSIRIS-REx asteroid sample-return mission. She was Project Manager for the TEGA instrument on the Phoenix Mars Mission, GRS on Mars Odyssey, and the ground data system for the MESSENGER XRS/GRS and LRO LEND instruments.	JPL · 27349
27353 Chrisspenner	2000 DY_{74}	Chris Spenner mentored a finalist in the 2011 Intel Science Talent Search, a science competition for high-school seniors. He teaches at the Harker School, San Jose, California, U.S.	JPL · 27353
27354 Stiklaitis	2000 DG_{75}	Angela Stiklaitis mentored a finalist in the 2011 Intel Science Talent Search, a science competition for high-school seniors. She teaches at the Penn Manor High School, Millersville, Pennsylvania, U.S.	JPL · 27354
27356 Mattstrom	2000 DK_{88}	Matthew Strom mentored a finalist in the 2011 Intel Science Talent Search, a science competition for high-school seniors. He teaches at the Basha High School, Chandler, Arizona, U.S.	JPL · 27356
27362 Morganroche	2000 EO	Morgan Roche Brady (born 1996) is the daughter of the discoverer.	IAU · 27362
27363 Alvanclark	2000 EX_{3}	Alvan Clark (1804–1887), a noted American astronomer and telescope manufacturer. He is best known for the large refractor telescopes he built, culminating in the 40-inch at Yerkes Observatory, still the largest such telescope in the world.	JPL · 27363
27365 Henryfitz	2000 EE_{21}	Henry Fitz (1808–1863), an amateur astronomer, early photographer and an optician best known for his high quality telescopes in an era when glass was of inferior quality.	JPL · 27365
27368 Raytesar	2000 EW_{36}	Raymond Tesar mentored a finalist in the 2011 Intel Science Talent Search, a science competition for high-school seniors. He teaches at the Plainview-Old Bethpage John F. Kennedy High School, Plainview, New York, U.S.	JPL · 27368
27372 Ujifusa	2000 EW_{42}	Allannah Ujifusa mentored a finalist in the 2011 Intel Science Talent Search, a science competition for high-school seniors. She teaches at the Cupertino High School, Cupertino, California, U.S.	JPL · 27372
27373 Davidvernon	2000 EM_{47}	David C. Vernon mentored a finalist in the 2011 Intel Science Talent Search, a science competition for high-school seniors. He teaches at the Western Alamance High School, Elon, North Carolina, U.S.	JPL · 27373
27374 Yim	2000 ER_{47}	P. J. Yim mentored a finalist in the 2011 Intel Science Talent Search, a science competition for high-school seniors. He teaches at the Saratoga High School, Saratoga, California, U.S.	JPL · 27374
27375 Asirvatham	2000 ER_{49}	Roshini Shreya Asirvatham (born 1999) is a finalist in the 2011 Broadcom MASTERS, a math and science competition for middle-school students, for her behavioral and social sciences project.	JPL · 27375
27381 Balasingam	2000 ES_{64}	Namrata Ramya Balasingam (born 1997) is a finalist in the 2011 Broadcom MASTERS, a math and science competition for middle-school students, for her physical sciences project.	JPL · 27381
27382 Justinbarber	2000 EF_{65}	Justin Alexander Barber (born 1997) is a finalist in the 2011 Broadcom MASTERS, a math and science competition for middle-school students, for his physical sciences project.	JPL · 27382
27383 Braebenedict	2000 ES_{79}	Braeden Christopher Benedict (born 1996) is a finalist in the 2011 Broadcom MASTERS, a math and science competition for middle-school students, for his physical sciences project.	JPL · 27383
27384 Meaganbethel	2000 ET_{81}	Meagan Alanna Bethel (born 1997) is a finalist in the 2011 Broadcom MASTERS, a math and science competition for middle-school students, for her animal and plant sciences project.	JPL · 27384
27385 Andblonsky	2000 EC_{83}	Andrew C. Blonsky (born 1999) is a finalist in the 2011 Broadcom MASTERS, a math and science competition for middle-school students, for his environmental sciences project.	JPL · 27385
27386 Chadcampbell	2000 EO_{85}	Chad Robert Campbell (born 1999) is a finalist in the 2011 Broadcom MASTERS, a math and science competition for middle-school students, for his biochemistry, medicine, health science and microbiology project.	JPL · 27386
27387 Chhabra	2000 ES_{85}	Chad Robert Campbell (born 1999) is a finalist in the 2011 Broadcom MASTERS, a math and science competition for middle-school students, for his biochemistry, medicine, health science and microbiology project.	JPL · 27387
27390 Kyledavis	2000 EC_{87}	Kyle McKay Davis (born 1997) is a finalist in the 2011 Broadcom MASTERS, a math and science competition for middle-school students, for his animal and plant sciences project.	JPL · 27390
27392 Valerieding	2000 EW_{90}	Valerie S. Ding (born 1997) is a finalist in the 2011 Broadcom MASTERS, a math and science competition for middle-school students, for her physical sciences project.	JPL · 27392
27396 Shuji	2000 EE_{101}	Shuji Nakamura, Japanese-American electronics engineer, inventor of the blue LED and the violet-blue laser	JPL · 27396
27397 D'Souza	2000 EZ_{103}	Alicia Danielle D´Souza (born 1997) is a finalist in the 2011 Broadcom MASTERS, a math and science competition for middle-school students, for her environmental sciences project.	JPL · 27397
27399 Gehring	2000 EC_{106}	Jeff Gehring (born 1980) is Lowell Observatory's Technical Facilities Manager, a position he has held since 2019. Prior to that, he was a Machinist and Instrument Maker. He is a vital member of the team that maintains a variety of research and outreach telescopes across multiple different sites.	IAU · 27399
27400 Mikewong	2000 EE_{106}	Mike Wong (born 1971) is a planetary scientist at the University of California at Berkeley who studies giant planets in the Solar System. He is part of the team that discovered a moon around asteroid (624) Hektor, and he studied a 2009 impact on Jupiter while monitoring of the atmosphere with adaptive optics.	IAU · 27400

== 27401–27500 ==
back to top

Named minor planet	Provisional	This minor planet was named for...	Ref · Catalog
27405 Danielfeeny	2000 EX_{112}	Daniel Jorgen Feeny (born 1996) is a finalist in the 2011 Broadcom MASTERS, a math and science competition for middle-school students, for his environmental sciences project.	JPL · 27405
27407 Haodo	2000 ES_{122}	Scott Hao Do (born 1981) is Lowell Observatory's IT Systems Support Specialist. He maintains vital infrastructure for more than 100 staff, from scientists to engineers to educators. He also ensures smooth functioning of the computing resources required to operate the Observatory's numerous telescopes.	IAU · 27407
27408 Kellyferguson	2000 EJ_{125}	Kelly Ferguson (born 1991) is the Education Coordinator for Lowell Observatory. She is responsible for making science and math accessible for the youngest scientists that pass through the Observatory's doors and is the leader of summer and preschool programs on and off the Lowell campus.	IAU · 27408
27409 Addiedove	2000 EJ_{135}	Adrienne Dove (born 1984) is an assistant professor of physics at the University of Central Florida (Orlando, Florida) whose studies include the cohesive behavior of materials in microgravity, cubesat experiments, and the electrostatic charging properties of Lunar and asteroid regoliths.	IAU · 27409
27410 Grimmett	2000 EO_{136}	Maria Elena Grimmett (born 1998) is a finalist in the 2011 Broadcom MASTERS, a math and science competition for middle-school students, for her environmental sciences project.	JPL · 27410
27411 Laurenhall	2000 EF_{137}	Lauren Monet Hall (born 1998) is a finalist in the 2011 Broadcom MASTERS, a math and science competition for middle-school students, for her earth and space sciences project.	JPL · 27411
27412 Teague	2000 EY_{137}	Thomas Teague (born 1954) is a barrister in London and a well known amateur astronomer in the UK. His major fields of study are solar and double star measurement from his home in Chester.	JPL · 27412
27413 Ambruster	2000 EW_{138}	Carol Ambruster (1943–2013) did pioneering research on magnetic activity and flares of cool stars. She led Chaco Canyon work providing evidence for an early Navajo sun-watching tradition. Carol was the epitome of a perspicuous observer, with consummate interests also in music, art and history, and the natural world (Src).	JPL · 27413
27417 Jessjohnson	2000 EN_{148}	Jess Johnson (born 1966) is an observer as well as instrumentation specialist with the Catalina Sky Survey.	JPL · 27417
27420 Shontobegay	2000 EF_{158}	Shonto Begay (born 1954) is a Navajo artist who lives in Flagstaff, Arizona. He is known for his visual art and writing and illustrating children's books.	IAU · 27420
27421 Nathanhan	2000 EK_{164}	Nathan Han (born 1999) is a finalist in the 2011 Broadcom MASTERS, a math and science competition for middle-school students, for his biochemistry, medicine, health science and microbiology project.	JPL · 27421
27422 Robheckman	2000 ET_{170}	Robert Tanner Heckman (born 1997) is a finalist in the 2011 Broadcom MASTERS, a math and science competition for middle-school students, for his biochemistry, medicine, health science and microbiology project.	JPL · 27422
27423 Dennisbowers	2000 EM_{177}	Dennis Bowers (born 1953), a long-time technician of the University of Arizona's Lunar and Planetary Laboratory, where he provided electronic engineering for spacecraft and ground-based observing instrumentation and up-to-date audio-visual support for classes, conferences, and meetings.	JPL · 27423
27425 Bakker	2000 EP_{198}	Robert T. Bakker (born 1945), an American paleontologist. He was instrumental in developing modern theories about dinosaurs and the warm-blooded behavior of some types of dinosaurs. His book The Dinosaur Heresies (1986) brought these new ideas to the public and lay scientists, and he was a consultant for the movie "Jurassic Park".	JPL · 27425
27426 Brettlawrie	2000 EP_{199}	Brett Lawrie (born 1959), an engineer at the University of Arizona's Lunar and Planetary Laboratory and Steward Observatory. He is instrumental in the design, fabrication and testing of instruments and hardware for large world-class ground-based observatories, analytical laboratories and numerous NASA spacecraft missions.	JPL · 27426
27431 Jimcole	2000 FM_{25}	Jim Cole (born 1951) is a Senior Public Program Educator at Lowell Observatory. He began by giving campus tours and operating telescopes for the public. He now serves as a telescope technician and was a major contributor to the design and implementation of the Giovale Open Deck Observatory.	IAU · 27431
27432 Kevinconley	2000 FO_{27}	Kevin Conley (born 1990) is a Public Program Supervisor at Lowell Observatory. He facilitates experiences for guests by leading tours of the historic campus, operating telescopes, teaching the public about astronomy, designing and implementing new programming, and training new educators.	IAU · 27432
27433 Hylak	2000 FM_{32}	Benjamin Lourdes Hylak (born 1997) is a finalist in the 2011 Broadcom MASTERS, a math and science competition for middle-school students, for his engineering project.	JPL · 27433
27434 Anirudhjain	2000 FJ_{35}	Anirudh Jain (born 1997) is a finalist in the 2011 Broadcom MASTERS, a math and science competition for middle-school students, for his engineering project.	JPL · 27434
27438 Carolynjons	2000 FM_{38}	Carolyn Kay Jons (born 1998) is a finalist in the 2011 Broadcom MASTERS, a math and science competition for middle-school students, for her physical sciences project.	JPL · 27438
27439 Kamimura	2000 FW_{38}	Jordan Roy Kamimura (born 1997) is a finalist in the 2011 Broadcom MASTERS, a math and science competition for middle-school students, for his animal and plant sciences project.	JPL · 27439
27440 Colekendrick	2000 FD_{39}	Coleman J. Kendrick (born 1998) is a finalist in the 2011 Broadcom MASTERS, a math and science competition for middle-school students, for his physical sciences project.	JPL · 27440
27445 Lynnlane	2000 FB_{57}	Lynn Lane (born 1955) has been the long-time business and finance manager of the University of Arizona's Lunar and Planetary Laboratory (LPL) and the Department of Planetary Sciences. She has served four LPL directors and provided invaluable support for numerous planetary scientists, students and spacecraft missions.	JPL · 27445
27446 Landoni	2000 FJ_{60}	Katherine Grace Landoni (born 1997) is a finalist in the 2011 Broadcom MASTERS, a math and science competition for middle-school students, for her animal and plant sciences project.	JPL · 27446
27447 Ichunlin	2000 GH_{5}	I-Chun Florence Lin (born 1997) is a finalist in the 2011 Broadcom MASTERS, a math and science competition for middle-school students, for her physical sciences project.	JPL · 27447
27449 Jamarkley	2000 GD_{14}	Jennifer Ann Markley (born 1998) is a finalist in the 2011 Broadcom MASTERS, a math and science competition for middle-school students, for her biochemistry, medicine, health science and microbiology project.	JPL · 27449
27450 Monzon	2000 GV_{16}	Adriana S. Monzon (born 1999) is a finalist in the 2011 Broadcom MASTERS, a math and science competition for middle-school students, for her earth and space sciences project.	JPL · 27450
27452 Nikhilpatel	2000 GS_{25}	Nikhil Sanjay Patel (born 1999) is a finalist in the 2011 Broadcom MASTERS, a math and science competition for middle-school students, for his environmental sciences project.	JPL · 27452
27453 Crystalpoole	2000 GN_{26}	Crystal Rennae Poole (born 1996) is a finalist in the 2011 Broadcom MASTERS, a math and science competition for middle-school students, for her physical sciences project.	JPL · 27453
27454 Samapaige	2000 GM_{27}	Samantha Paige Rowland (born 1997) is a finalist in the 2011 Broadcom MASTERS, a math and science competition for middle-school students, for her animal and plant sciences project.	JPL · 27454
27456 Sarkisian	2000 GK_{35}	Emily Marie Sarkisian (born 1997) is a finalist in the 2011 Broadcom MASTERS, a math and science competition for middle-school students, for her earth and space sciences project.	JPL · 27456
27457 Tovinkere	2000 GP_{39}	Mahita Gauri Tovinkere (born 1999) is a finalist in the 2011 Broadcom MASTERS, a math and science competition for middle-school students, for her earth and space sciences project.	JPL · 27457
27458 Williamwhite	2000 GC_{42}	William Henry White (born 1997) is a finalist in the 2011 Broadcom MASTERS, a math and science competition for middle-school students, for his animal and plant sciences project.	JPL · 27458
27465 Cambroziak	2000 GB_{62}	Carole Ambroziak, a mentor of a finalist in the 2011 Broadcom MASTERS, a math and science competition for middle-school students.	JPL · 27465
27466 Cargibaysal	2000 GJ_{65}	Cargi Baysal, a mentor of a finalist in the 2011 Broadcom MASTERS, a math and science competition for middle-school students.	JPL · 27466
27470 Debrabeckett	2000 GT_{72}	Debra Beckett, a mentor of a finalist in the 2011 Broadcom MASTERS, a math and science competition for middle-school students.	JPL · 27470
27478 Kevinbloh	2000 GB_{86}	Kevin M. Bloh, a mentor of a finalist in the 2011 Broadcom MASTERS, a math and science competition for middle-school students.	JPL · 27478
27480 Heablonsky	2000 GV_{88}	Heather Blonsky, a mentor of a finalist in the 2011 Broadcom MASTERS, a math and science competition for middle-school students.	JPL · 27480
27491 Broksas	2000 GC_{104}	Heidi Broksas, a mentor of a finalist in the 2011 Broadcom MASTERS, a math and science competition for middle-school students.	JPL · 27491
27492 Susanduncan	2000 GN_{104}	Susan Duncan, a mentor of a finalist in the 2011 Broadcom MASTERS, a math and science competition for middle-school students.	JPL · 27492
27493 Derikesibill	2000 GU_{105}	Derik Esibill, a mentor of a finalist in the 2011 Broadcom MASTERS, a math and science competition for middle-school students.	JPL · 27493
27495 Heatherfennell	2000 GD_{114}	Heather Fennell mentored a finalist in the 2011 Broadcom MASTERS, a math and science competition for middle-school students.	JPL · 27495
27500 Mandelbrot	2000 GW_{132}	Benoit Mandelbrot (1924–2010), was a Polish-born French and American mathematician and polymath. He studied geometric and physical structures, to which he gave the name fractals, that are self-similar at different scales. Fractal concepts have found application to many disciplines, from cardiology to the analysis of stock-market prices.	JPL · 27500

== 27501–27600 ==
back to top

Named minor planet	Provisional	This minor planet was named for...	Ref · Catalog
27502 Stephbecca	2000 GR_{137}	Stephanie E. and Rebecca N. Wasserman, daughters of the discoverer	JPL · 27502
27503 Dankof	2000 GM_{140}	Curtis Dankof (born 1994) is a Public Program Supervisor at Lowell Observatory and is responsible for the day-to-day operations of the public outreach programs. He also leverages the knowledge he gained as a certified interpretive guide to train the outreach team on effective interpretive methods.	IAU · 27503
27504 Denune	2000 GK_{141}	Kimberley Denune (born 1990) is the Visitor Experience Supervisor for Lowell Observatory. She manages the Starry Skies Gift shop and ticketing desks. Kim is responsible for managing staff and visual merchandising.	IAU · 27504
27505 Catieblazek	2000 GN_{141}	Catie Blazek (born 1988) is the HR/Payroll Supervisor for Lowell Observatory. She is instrumental in Lowell Observatory's wellness efforts, which were impactful during the COVID-19 pandemic. She is a guardian of our company culture and champions a diverse, equitable, friendly, collegial workplace.	IAU · 27505
27506 Glassmeier	2000 GQ_{141}	Karl-Heinz Glassmeier (born 1954) is an expert in magnetospheric and plasma physics and Lead Investigator of magnetometers on numerous planetary space missions. He found comet 67P/Churyumov-Gerasimenko to be emitting a 'song' in the form of oscillations in the magnetic field.	IAU · 27506
27507 Travisbrown	2000 GS_{141}	Travis Brown (born 1989) is an Educator in Lowell Observatory's Native American Astronomy Outreach Program. He brings his enthusiasm and energy to partnerships with teachers to get kids excited about science. He enjoys introducing the students to rocketry and robots.	IAU · 27507
27508 Johncompton	2000 GS_{142}	John Compton (born 1984), a staff member at the Lowell Observatory in Flagstaff, Arizona, who is responsible for creating schedules and specialty programs for visiting groups.	IAU · 27508
27509 Burcher	2000 GB_{143}	Sarah Burcher (born 1990) is Outreach Manager at Lowell Observatory. She oversees the outreach team and the programs they deliver. She was a critical member of the team that commissioned the Giovale Open Deck Observatory and has significantly improved the quality of the live video observing program.	IAU · 27509
27510 Lisaactor	2000 GD_{143}	Lisa Actor (born 1957) is the deputy director for Development at Lowell Observatory. She is in charge of all of Lowell's philanthropic activities. She and her team have successfully raised funds for Lowell's many research and outreach programs, as well as for its capital expansion projects.	IAU · 27510
27511 Emiliedunham	2000 GD_{153}	Emilie T. Dunham (born 1992) completed her Ph.D. research at Arizona State University on the study of short-lived radionuclides present in meteorite samples to probe the solar system's galactic formation environment.	IAU · 27511
27512 Gilstrap	2000 GC_{167}	Lisa Gilstrap, a mentor of a finalist in the 2011 Broadcom MASTERS, a math and science competition for middle-school students.	JPL · 27512
27513 Mishapipe	2000 GY_{169}	Misha Pipe (born 1990) is an Educator in Lowell Observatory's Native American Astronomy Outreach Program. She uses her talent in relating to children in partnerships with teachers to get kids excited about science. She also designs hands-on activities and organizes summer and winter camps.	IAU · 27513
27514 Markov	2000 HM_{3}	Andrei Andreevich Markov, Russian mathematician	JPL · 27514
27515 Gunnels	2000 HM_{7}	Kim Gunnels, a mentor of a finalist in the 2011 Broadcom MASTERS, a math and science competition for middle-school students.	JPL · 27515
27519 Miames	2000 HV_{20}	Michaela Iames, a mentor of a finalist in the 2011 Broadcom MASTERS, a math and science competition for middle-school students.	JPL · 27519
27520 Rounds	2000 HL_{26}	Hannah Rounds (born 1987) is the Corporate and Foundation Relations Manager at Lowell Observatory. She acquires funding from organizations for astronomy research, educational activities, historic preservation, and capital projects. She previously served as a Development Assistant and as Grant Writer.	IAU · 27520
27521 Josschindler	2000 HS_{26}	Jos Schindler (born 1989) is a Senior Public Program Educator at Lowell Observatory. In that role, they take the Observatory's guests on tours of the historic campus, operate telescopes for the public, and help engage children in science with Lowell Observatory's Camps for Kids.	IAU · 27521
27522 Lenkenyon	2000 HF_{29}	Leonard Kenyon, a mentor of a finalist in the 2011 Broadcom MASTERS, a math and science competition for middle-school students.	JPL · 27522
27524 Clousing	2000 HZ_{33}	Wayne Clousing (born 1949) is a retired teacher, formerly of Watson Groen Christian School. He taught the 6th grade from 1974 to 2014, inspiring students to pursue interests in science, math and technology.	IAU · 27524
27525 Vartovka	2000 HZ_{34}	Vartovka, a hill near Banská Bystrica, Slovakia, on top of which a 16th-century watch tower was rebuilt as a public observatory in 1961 † ‡	MPC · 27525
27527 Kirkkoehler	2000 HL_{52}	Leonard Kenyon, a mentor of a finalist in the 2011 Broadcom MASTERS, a math and science competition for middle-school students.	JPL · 27527
27529 Rhiannonmayne	2000 HJ_{64}	Rhiannon Mayne (born 1980) is an associate professor at Texas Christian University and curator of the Monnig Meteorite Collection. Using laboratory and telescopic techniques, she has made important contributions towards understanding the process of planetary differentiation in the early Solar System.	IAU · 27529
27530 Daveshuck	2000 HC_{66}	Dave Shuck (born 1971) is the Facilities, Grounds, and Maintenance Manager at Lowell Observatory. He supervises the facilities team, which is instrumental in keeping the campus maintained and looking its best. He plays a vital role in the Mars Hill campus expansion, including the Giovale Open Deck Observatory and the upcoming Astronomy Discovery Center.	IAU · 27530
27531 Sweaton	2000 HH_{66}	Mike Sweaton (born 1957) is the Electrical Engineer for Lowell Observatory. He has ensured the continued successful operation of the Lowell Discovery Telescope (LDT). He has also made many performance improvements to the LDT and assisted with night time operations.	IAU · 27531
27532 Buchwald-Wright	2000 HL_{66}	Charles von Buchwald-Wright (born 1986) is Lowell Observatory's IT Systems and Network Administrator. He maintains infrastructure for more than 100 staff, from scientists to engineers to educators. He also ensures smooth functioning of the computing resources required to operate the telescopes.	IAU · 27532
27533 Johnbrucato	2000 HP_{70}	John Brucato (born 1968) is a senior scientist at the Astrobiology Laboratory at INAF Italy. He is an expert in laboratory studies related to asteroids and astrobiology, and simulating physical-chemical processes of organic molecules interacting with minerals found in planetary materials.	IAU · 27533
27537 Dianaweintraub	2000 HZ_{83}	Diana Weintraub (born 1978) is Lowell Observatory's Staff Accountant. She has intricate knowledge of policies that govern the Observatory's finances and is integral to ensuring fiduciary responsibility of our resources. She started by managing the gift shop and has advanced to the business office.	IAU · 27537
27539 Elmoutamid	2000 HB_{97}	Maryame El Moutamid (born 1984) is a research associate at Cornell University (Ithaca, NY). Her studies include planetary rings and orbital dynamics.	IAU · 27539
27540 Kevinwhite	2000 HA_{100}	Kevin White (born 1981) is Public Program Supervisor at Lowell Observatory. He is responsible for the day-to-day operations associated with the Observatory's public outreach programs. He also oversees volunteer training and leads regular constellations refreshers for the education staff and volunteers.	IAU · 27540
27546 Maryfran	2000 JB_{17}	Maryfran McAuliffe, a mentor of a finalist in the 2011 Broadcom MASTERS, a math and science competition for middle-school students.	JPL · 27546
27549 Joannemichet	2000 JF_{23}	Joanne Michet, a mentor of a finalist in the 2011 Broadcom MASTERS, a math and science competition for middle-school students.	JPL · 27549
27551 Pelayo	2000 JU_{31}	Heather Pelayo, a mentor of a finalist in the 2011 Broadcom MASTERS, a math and science competition for middle-school students.	JPL · 27551
27556 Williamprem	2000 JO_{54}	William Prem, a mentor of a finalist in the 2011 Broadcom MASTERS, a math and science competition for middle-school students.	JPL · 27556
27562 Josephmarcus	2000 KJ_{54}	Joseph Marcus (born 1949) is a pathologist with a longtime interest in comets. As a resident at Washington University in St. Louis, he founded and edited the quarterly Comet News Service published by the McDonnell Planetarium from 1975 to 1986. He serves on the Lowell Observatory Advisory Board where he chairs the Putnam Collection Center Committee.	IAU · 27562
27563 Staceychristen	2000 KD_{60}	Stacey Christen (born 1968), a staff member at the Lowell Observatory in Flagstaff, Arizona, who works for the observatory's archives and museum, processing and cataloging manuscript collections and creating public exhibits.	IAU · 27563
27564 Astreichelt	2000 KE_{77}	Astrid Reichelt, a mentor of a finalist in the 2011 Broadcom MASTERS, a math and science competition for middle-school students.	JPL · 27564
27565 de Wet	2000 KX_{81}	Martin de Wet (b. 1952) earned a master's degree in Aeronautical and Astronautical Engineeringand worked on commercial, scientific, and governmental spacecraft. He worked in the space launch industry before retiring. Martin serves on Lowell Observatory's Advisory Board.	IAU · 27565
27570 Erinschumacher	2000 QA_{150}	Erin Schumacher, a mentor of a finalist in the 2011 Broadcom MASTERS, a math and science competition for middle-school students.	JPL · 27570
27571 Bobscott	2000 QT_{204}	Bob Scott, a mentor of a finalist in the 2011 Broadcom MASTERS, a math and science competition for middle-school students.	JPL · 27571
27572 Shurtleff	2000 QS_{227}	Eileen Shurtleff, a mentor of a finalist in the 2011 Broadcom MASTERS, a math and science competition for middle-school students.	JPL · 27572
27576 Denisespirou	2000 RM_{70}	Denise Spirou, a mentor of a finalist in the 2011 Broadcom MASTERS, a math and science competition for middle-school students.	JPL · 27576
27578 Yogisullivan	2000 SX_{142}	Yogi Sullivan, a mentor of a finalist in the 2011 Broadcom MASTERS, a math and science competition for middle-school students.	JPL · 27578
27580 Angelataylor	2000 UJ_{23}	Angela Taylor, a mentor of a finalist in the 2011 Broadcom MASTERS, a math and science competition for middle-school students.	JPL · 27580
27582 Jackieterrel	2000 UJ_{50}	Jackie Terrel, a mentor of a finalist in the 2011 Broadcom MASTERS, a math and science competition for middle-school students.	JPL · 27582
27584 Barbaravelez	2000 UH_{99}	Barbara Velez, a mentor of a finalist in the 2011 Broadcom MASTERS, a math and science competition for middle-school students.	JPL · 27584
27588 Wegley	2000 YP_{10}	Peter Wegley, a mentor of a finalist in the 2011 Broadcom MASTERS, a math and science competition for middle-school students	JPL · 27588
27589 Paigegentry	2000 YV_{95}	Paige Maree Gentry (born 1998) is a finalist in the 2012 Broadcom MASTERS, a math and science competition for middle-school students, for her animal and plant sciences project.	JPL · 27589
27590 Koarimatsu	2000 YO_{132}	Ko Arimatsu (born 1987) is an astronomer at Kyoto University. He discovered a kilometer-sized Kuiper belt object by stellar occultation using a low-cost small telescope named the Organized Autotelescopes for Serendipitous Event Survey or OASES.	IAU · 27590
27591 Rugilmartin	2001 AL_{15}	Raymond Ueki Gilmartin (born 1998) is a finalist in the 2012 Broadcom MASTERS, a math and science competition for middle-school students, for his physical sciences project.	JPL · 27591
27593 Oliviamarie	2001 CA_{13}	Olivia Marie Henderson (born 1997) is a finalist in the 2012 Broadcom MASTERS, a math and science competition for middle-school students, for her earth and space sciences project.	JPL · 27593
27595 Hnath	2001 CR_{42}	Sean Michael Hnath (born 1998) is a finalist in the 2012 Broadcom MASTERS, a math and science competition for middle-school students, for his environmental sciences project.	JPL · 27595
27596 Maldives	2001 DH	Maldives, an island-country in the Pacific Ocean, the world's lowest-lying country.	JPL · 27596
27597 Varuniyer	2001 DF_{14}	Varun V. Iyer (born 1998) is a finalist in the 2012 Broadcom MASTERS, a math and science competition for middle-school students, for his physical sciences project.	JPL · 27597

== 27601–27700 ==
back to top

Named minor planet	Provisional	This minor planet was named for...	Ref · Catalog
27602 Chaselewis	2001 FA_{34}	Chase Douglas Lewis (born 1999) is a finalist in the 2012 Broadcom MASTERS, a math and science competition for middle-school students, for his physical sciences project.	JPL · 27602
27604 Affeldt	2001 FY_{174}	Allan Affeldt (born 1958) is known for the restoration of historic hotels in Arizona and New Mexico. He once worked extensively in international conflict resolution and currently serves on many non-profit boards including the Lowell Observatory Advisory Board.	IAU · 27604
27606 Davidli	2001 KW	David X. Li (born 1998) is a finalist in the 2012 Broadcom MASTERS, a math and science competition for middle-school students, for his physical sciences project.	JPL · 27606
27610 Shixuanli	2001 KB_{16}	Shixuan Justin Li (born 1998) is a finalist in the 2012 Broadcom MASTERS, a math and science competition for middle-school students, for his biochemistry, medicine, health science, and microbiology project.	JPL · 27610
27613 Annalou	2001 KV_{28}	Anna J. Lou (born 2000) is a finalist in the 2012 Broadcom MASTERS, a math and science competition for middle-school students, for her mathematics and computer science project.	JPL · 27613
27615 Daniellu	2001 KX_{38}	Daniel Lu (born 1998) is a finalist in the 2012 Broadcom MASTERS, a math and science competition for middle-school students, for his physical sciences project.	JPL · 27615
27618 Ceilierin	2001 KL_{55}	Ceili Erin Masterson (born 1998) is a finalist in the 2012 Broadcom MASTERS, a math and science competition for middle-school students, for her animal and plant sciences project.	JPL · 27618
27619 Ethanmessier	2001 KS_{57}	Ethan Wyatt Messier (born 2000) is a finalist in the 2012 Broadcom MASTERS, a math and science competition for middle-school students, for his physical sciences project.	JPL · 27619
27620 Kristenwalsh	2001 KO_{61}	Kristen Walsh (b. 1955) is a civil engineer who spent her career in the aerospace industry, working in structural dynamics of rockets, missiles, and spacecraft, before accepting the role of Launch Services Program Manager for Delta II and Delta IV for NASA and commercial missions. She serves on the Lowell Observatory Advisory Board.	IAU · 27620
27622 Richardbaker	2001 KS_{71}	Richard Baker (b. 1950) served in the Air Force for four years before becoming an aerospace engineer. He worked in the aerospace industry, specializing in trajectory analysis on the Delta Launch Vehicle and robotics for the International Space Station. He serves on the Lowell Observatory Advisory Board.	IAU · 27622
27626 Kirkbender	2001 NA	Kirk Bender, American software developer and avid amateur astronomer and star-party organizer.	IAU · 27626
27657 Berkhey	1974 PC	Joannes Le Francq van Berkhey (1729–1812) was a famous Dutch physician, biologist and naturalist noted for his Natural History of Holland. He was considered an excellent poet for his time. The name was suggested by C. E. Koppeschaar	JPL · 27657
27656 Aleblain	1974 OU_{1}	Alejandro “Ale” Blain, Argentine amateur astronomer.	IAU · 27656
27658 Dmitrijbagalej	1978 RV	Dmitrij Ivanovich Bagalej (1857–1932) was a historian, professor and rector of Kharkov University. His scientific works were devoted to the ancient history of Ukraine, Russia and Lithuania. During 1914–1917 he was head of the Kharkov town council	JPL · 27658
27659 Dolsky	1978 SO_{7}	Alexandr Alexandrovich Dolsky (born 1938) is an Honoured Artist of Russia, a Bulat Okudzhava State literary prize-winner, a guitarist-virtuoso, a poet-musician and an author of many collections of poems and sonnets.	JPL · 27659
27660 Waterwayuni	1978 TR_{7}	Saint-Petersburg State University of Waterway Communications (Санкт-Петербургский государственный университет водных коммуникаций), Russia	JPL · 27660
27675 Paulmaley	1981 CH	Paul D. Maley (born 1947) is an amateur astronomer and an expert in occultation methods to define the shapes and sizes of asteroids. He has recorded nearly 300 separate asteroidal-occultation events spanning more than four decades. He has shown a lifelong passion for promoting the detection of asteroidal satellites by occultation.	JPL · 27675

== 27701–27800 ==
back to top

Named minor planet	Provisional	This minor planet was named for...	Ref · Catalog
27706 Strogen	1985 TM_{3}	James A. Strogen (born 1947), American telescope operator (at the Mount Wilson Observatory), leader of the Los Angeles Astronomical Society, and who assisted in organizing the photographic glass plate archive of the 1.2-m Schmidt Oschin Telescope at Palomar Observatory	JPL · 27706
27709 Orenburg	1988 CU_{3}	The Russian city of Orenburg (Оренбург), near the border to Kazakhstan	JPL · 27709
27710 Henseling	1988 RY_{1}	Robert Henseling (1883–1964), German teacher and author of popular works on astronomy, editor of the annual Sternbüchlein, founder of the Stuttgart Volkssternwarte and of the journal Die Sterne	JPL · 27710
27711 Kirschvink	1988 VT_{4}	Joseph Kirschvink (born 1953), American earth scientist	JPL (Src) · 27711
27712 Coudray	1988 VR_{7}	Clemens Wenzeslaus Coudray (1775–1845), German neoclassical architect	JPL · 27712
27714 Dochu	1989 BR	Dochu in Awa is the soil column which was formed when a steep cliff eroded due to the wind and rain. This is a globally rare natural feature, unique in Japan, and was designated as a national monument of Japan.	JPL · 27714
27716 Nobuyuki	1989 CX_{1}	Nobuyuki Yamaguchi (born 1932), Japanese meteorologist and astronomer	JPL · 27716
27718 Gouda	1989 GH_{3}	Gouda, a city in the South Holland province of the Netherlands, was founded in 1272.	JPL · 27718
27719 Fast	1989 SR_{3}	Wilhelm Fast (1936–2005), Russian mathematician, who directed a project to model the Tunguska event, and his daughter Annie, who assisted in subsequent projects	JPL · 27719
27724 Jeannoël	1990 QA_{1}	Alexandre-Jean Noël (1752–1832), a French landscape and marine painter.	JPL · 27724
27736 Ekaterinburg	1990 SA_{6}	The Russian city of Yekaterinburg (also known as Ekaterinburg, formerly Sverdlovsk)	JPL · 27736
27739 Kimihiro	1990 UV	Kimihiro Matsugi (born 1955), Japanese elementary teacher and presenter at Geisei Observatory	JPL · 27739
27740 Obatomoyuki	1990 UC_{1}	Tomoyuki Oba (born 1965), Japanese high school teacher and presenter at Geisei Observatory	JPL · 27740
27748 Vivianhoette	1991 AL	Vivian Hoette, an American astronomy educator at the Yerkes Observatory for the Lawrence Hall of Science	JPL · 27748
27749 Tsukadaken	1991 BJ_{2}	Ken Tsukada (b.1982), a Japanese astronomer.	IAU · 27749
27758 Michelson	1991 RJ_{4}	Albert A. Michelson (born 1852–1931), a German-born American physicist and Nobelist	JPL · 27758
27764 von Flüe	1991 RV_{40}	Saint Nicholas of Flüe (1417–1487), Swiss councilor, judge, mystic, politician, and later hermit and patron saint of Switzerland	JPL · 27764
27765 Brockhaus	1991 RJ_{41}	Friedrich Arnold Brockhaus (1772–1823), German publisher, best known for its Brockhaus encyclopedia, which served as models for other reference books	JPL · 27765
27775 Lilialmanzor	1992 CA_{3}	Lucette Destouches (1912–2019; née Lucie Almansor), a French dancer, who was married to the writer Louis-Ferdinand Céline for more than 30 years.	JPL · 27775
27776 Cortland	1992 DH_{1}	State University of New York College at Cortland (Src)	JPL · 27776
27784 Elizabethpearce	1992 OE	Elizabeth Mary Pearce (2000–2025), daughter of Andrew Pearce, discoverer of southern galactic novae.	JPL · 27784
27787 Andokazuma	1992 UO_{6}	Kazuma Ando (b. 1984), a Japanese amateur astronomer.	JPL · 27787
27789 Astrakhan	1993 BB_{7}	The Astrakhan Khanate, a Tatar feudal state established in the 15th century	JPL · 27789
27790 Urashimataro	1993 CG_{1}	Urashima Tarō, a fictional character and the protagonist of a Japanese legend about a kind-hearted young fisherman. The story is loved by generations of children and many beaches across Japan are claimed to be the setting where the story took place.	JPL · 27790
27791 Masaru	1993 DD_{1}	Masaru Kubota (born 1959), Japanese television broadcaster, weather forecaster, and science and astronomy popularizer	JPL · 27791
27792 Fridakahlo	1993 DR_{2}	Frida Kahlo (1907–1954), a Mexican painter who is known for her portraits and self-portraits, as well as for paintings inspired by the nature and artifacts of Mexico.	JPL · 27792

== 27801–27900 ==
back to top

Named minor planet	Provisional	This minor planet was named for...	Ref · Catalog
27809 Murakamiyasuhiko	1993 HS_{1}	Yasuhiko Murakami (b. 1973), a Japanese amateur astronomer and director of the Nayoro Observatory in Nayoro City, Hokkaido.	IAU · 27809
27810 Daveturner	1993 OC_{2}	David G. Turner, Canadian astronomer †	MPC · 27810
27815 Katsuhito	1993 SA_{1}	Katsuhito Nakajima (b. 1971), a Japanese amateur astronomer and chief researcher of the Ginganomori Observatory in Rikubetsu Town, Hokkaido.	IAU · 27815
27816 Naitohiroyuki	1993 TH_{2}	Hiroyuki Naito (b. 1977), a Japanese astronomer.	IAU · 27816
27827 Ukai	1993 XJ_{1}	A member of the Waseda Astronomical Association, he participated in the construction of an observatory hut in Nobeyama in 1970, camping out there for 30 consecutive days and becoming the first person to spend 100 nights in the hut	JPL · 27827
27845 Josephmeyer	1994 TJ_{16}	Joseph Meyer, 19th-century German merchant, publisher and publicist, founder of the Bibliographisches Institut at Gotha, which pioneered the subscription system of encyclopedia publishing	JPL · 27845
27844 Fumitake	1994 TG_{1}	Fumitake Watanabe (b. 1983), a Japanese amateur astronomer.	IAU · 27844
27846 Honegger	1994 TT_{16}	Arthur Honegger, Swiss-French composer	JPL · 27846
27849 Suyumbika	1994 UU_{1}	Suyumbika Tower, the symbol of Kazan, one of the oldest towns in Russia; legend has it that princess Suyumbika jumped from the tower rather than allow herself to be captured by enemies surrounding the town	JPL · 27849
27861 Sudachikako	1995 BL_{4}	Chikako Suda (b. 1949), a Japanese amateur astronomer and a member of the Japanese Meteor Society.	IAU · 27861
27855 Giorgilli	1995 AK	Antonio Giorgilli (born 1949), professor of mathematical physics at the University of Milan, distinguished himself in his productive career with numerous works in perturbation theory of Hamiltonian systems, with applications to studies of the long-term orbital stability of major and minor planets	JPL · 27855
27864 Antongraff	1995 EA_{9}	Anton Graff, 18th-century Swiss portrait painter	JPL · 27864
27865 Ludgerfroebel	1995 FQ	Ludger Froebel (born 1958) has been the leader of several space projects and the manager of the "Space Transport and Space Technology" program at the German Aerospace Center (DLR). He initiated the DLR Compact Satellite Program, including the AsteroidFinder mission that will be searching for inner-earth objects	JPL · 27865
27870 Jillwatson	1995 VW	Jill Watson, American graduate of the U.S. Air Force Academy, first assigned to AMOS (the discovery site) on Maui	JPL · 27870
27879 Shibata	1996 CZ_{2}	Shinpei Shibata, Japanese astrophysicist	JPL · 27879
27882 Ootanihideji	1996 EJ_{1}	Hideji Ootani (b. 1953), a Japanese dentist and amateur astronomer.	IAU · 27882
27887 Kiyoharu	1996 GU_{1}	Kiyoharu Ogasawara (b. 1959), a Japanese amateur astronomer.	IAU · 27887
27895 Yeduzheng	1996 LL	Ye Duzheng (1916–2013), a Meteorologist	JPL · 27895
27896 Tourminator	1996 NB	Peter Sagan (born 1990) is a Slovak road cyclist. One of his nicknames is the Tourminator due to several stage wins and good placing in the points classification of top races. He was a winner of the Green jersey in the Tour de France in 2012, 2013 and 2014.	JPL · 27896
27899 Letterman	1996 QF	David M. Letterman (born 1947), a seven-time Emmy-winning American comedian, actor and producer.	JPL · 27899
27900 Cecconi	1996 RM	Massimo Cecconi (born 1965) has worked on the GAIA mission and for the International Space Station.	JPL · 27900

== 27901–28000 ==
back to top

Named minor planet	Provisional	This minor planet was named for...	Ref · Catalog
27910 Yangfuyu	1996 TA_{14}	Yang Fuyu (1927–2023), a leading biochemist.	IAU · 27910
27915 Nancywright	1996 UU_{1}	Nancy Wright, friend of the discoverer	JPL · 27915
27917 Edoardo	1996 VU_{2}	Edoardo Tesi, grandson of Luciano Tesi †	MPC · 27917
27918 Azusagawa	1996 VJ_{4}	Azusagawa, a 65-km-long river which flows from the Hida mountain range, the so-called Northern Alps, through Matumoto city, Nagano prefecture, Japan.	JPL · 27918
27920 Noguchiujo	1996 VV_{8}	Noguchi Ujo (1882–1945), a Japanese poet and lyricist of doyo (nursery rhymes) and min'yō (Japanese folk songs).	IAU · 27920
27922 Mascheroni	1996 XW_{8}	Lorenzo Mascheroni, Italian mathematician	JPL · 27922
27923 Dimitribartolini	1996 XJ_{32}	Dimitri Bartolini (born 2015) is the grandson of the first discoverer.	JPL · 27923
27928 Nithintumma	1997 EG_{38}	Nithin Reddy Tumma (born 1994) is a finalist in the 2012 Intel Science Talent Search, and was awarded first place in the 2011 Intel International Science and Engineering Fair, for his biochemistry project.	JPL · 27928
27930 Nakamatsu	1997 GN_{6}	Kathy Nakamatsu mentored a finalist in the 2012 Intel Science Talent Search, a science competition for high-school seniors.	JPL · 27930
27931 Zeitlin-Trinkle	1997 GU_{7}	Maria Zeitlin-Trinkle mentored a finalist in the 2012 Intel Science Talent Search, a science competition for high-school seniors.	JPL · 27931
27932 Leonyao	1997 GF_{8}	Leon Yao (born 1994) is a finalist in the 2012 Intel Science Talent Search, a science competition for high-school seniors, for his engineering project.	JPL · 27932
27938 Guislain	1997 JG_{16}	Joseph Guislain (1797–1860), one of the first students at the University of Ghent, was appointed head of the psychiatric hospitals in Ghent in 1820. He is remembered for proposing a law that formed the basis of psychiatric treatment in Belgium for more than a century	JPL · 27938
27947 Emilemathieu	1997 NH_{3}	Émile Léonard Mathieu, French mathematician	JPL · 27947
27949 Jonasz	1997 NU_{4}	Michel Jonasz, French poet and singer	JPL · 27949
27952 Atapuerca	1997 PR_{4}	Atapuerca, small Spanish mountain chain in the province of Burgos, a UNESCO World Heritage site because of the human fossil deposits discovered there	JPL · 27952
27955 Yasumasa	1997 QU_{4}	Yasumasa Watanabe (born 1946), a member of the Yamagata Astronomical Society in 1986.	JPL · 27955
27958 Giussano	1997 RP_{9}	Giussano, an Italian town in the heart of Brianza, is famous for its furniture design companies. Among the town's historical monuments and villas is the Villa Sartirana, recently renovated. Home to the local library, this villa hosts in its decorated halls cultural events, including some aimed at astronomical popularization	JPL · 27958
27959 Fagioli	1997 SE_{1}	Giancarlo Fagioli, Italian cartographer and amateur astronomer †	MPC · 27959
27960 Dobiáš	1997 SN_{1}	Václav Dobiáš (1909–1978), Czech composer, organizer of musical life and pedagogue, educated a number of composers, including the discoverer's father. His cycle of songs Praho jediná ("Prague, the Only One") is a beautiful apotheosis of the Czech city	JPL · 27960
27961 Kostelecký	1997 SU_{1}	Jan Kostelecký (born 1946) is a professor at the Faculty of Civil Engineering of the Czech Technical University in Prague. He deals with geodetic astronomy, space geodesy and geodynamics. He also served as the supervisor of both the master's and doctoral theses of the discoverer.	JPL · 27961
27963 Hartkopf	1997 ST_{2}	US astronomer William I. Hartkopf (born 1951), president of IAU Commission 26 (Double and Multiple Stars) from 2003 to 2006, made important contributions to double-star orbit determinations and speckle interferometric observations. In 2009 he was awarded the Simon Newcomb award of the U.S. Naval Observatory.	JPL · 27963
27966 Changguang	1997 SA_{34}	Changguang stands for the Changchun Institute of Optics, Fine Mechanics and Physics of the Chinese Academy of Sciences.	JPL · 27966
27967 Beppebianchi	1997 TE	Giuseppe Bianchi (1791–1866) founded the astronomical observatory at Modena in 1827 and served as its director until 1859. Observing with the Reichenbach meridian circle he made a catalogue of 220 fundamental stars as a revision of Piazzi's work. This allowed him to discover the variability of some of the proper motions	JPL · 27967
27968 Bobylapointe	1997 TM_{1}	Boby Lapointe, French singer and mathematician.	JPL · 27968
27974 Drejsl	1997 UH	Radim Drejsl, Czech composer †	MPC · 27974
27975 Mazurkiewicz	1997 UJ_{1}	Stefan Mazurkiewicz, Polish mathematician	JPL · 27975
27977 Distratis	1997 UK_{5}	Cosimo Distratis, Italian supporter of the amateur observatory at Montefusco Uggiano in Italy †	MPC · 27977
27978 Lubosluka	1997 UN_{9}	Luboš Sluka, Czech composer †	MPC · 27978
27982 Atsushimiyazaki	1997 UH_{22}	Atsushi Miyazaki (1970–2011), a staff member of Association for Aid and Relief, Japan, died while engaging in relief activities to support the survivors of the 2011 Van earthquake.	JPL · 27982
27983 Bernardi	1997 UU_{24}	Fabrizio Bernardi, Italian astronomer	JPL · 27983
27984 Herminefranz	1997 VN	Hermine and Franz Stoss, parents of the discoverer, Banat-born German amateur astronomer Rainer Michael Stoss †	MPC · 27984
27985 Remanzacco	1997 VC_{1}	Remanzacco, Italy, location of the Osservatorio di Remanzacco, an amateur observatory	JPL · 27985
27986 Hanuš	1997 VV_{2}	Jan Hanuš, Czech composer †	MPC · 27986
27988 Menabrea	1997 VA_{4}	Luigi Federico Menabrea, Italian (Piedmontese) mathematician and statesman	JPL · 27988
27991 Koheijimiura	1997 VW_{6}	Koheiji Miura (1933–2006), an internationally known Japanese ceramic artist.	JPL · 27991
27997 Bandos	1997 WV_{7}	Bandos, a small island located in the North Male Atoll in the Republic of Maldives.	JPL · 27997

back to top

Preceded by 26,001–27,000	Meanings of minor-planet names List of minor planets: 27,001–28,000	Succeeded by 28,001–29,000
