= Michael Ryschkewitsch =

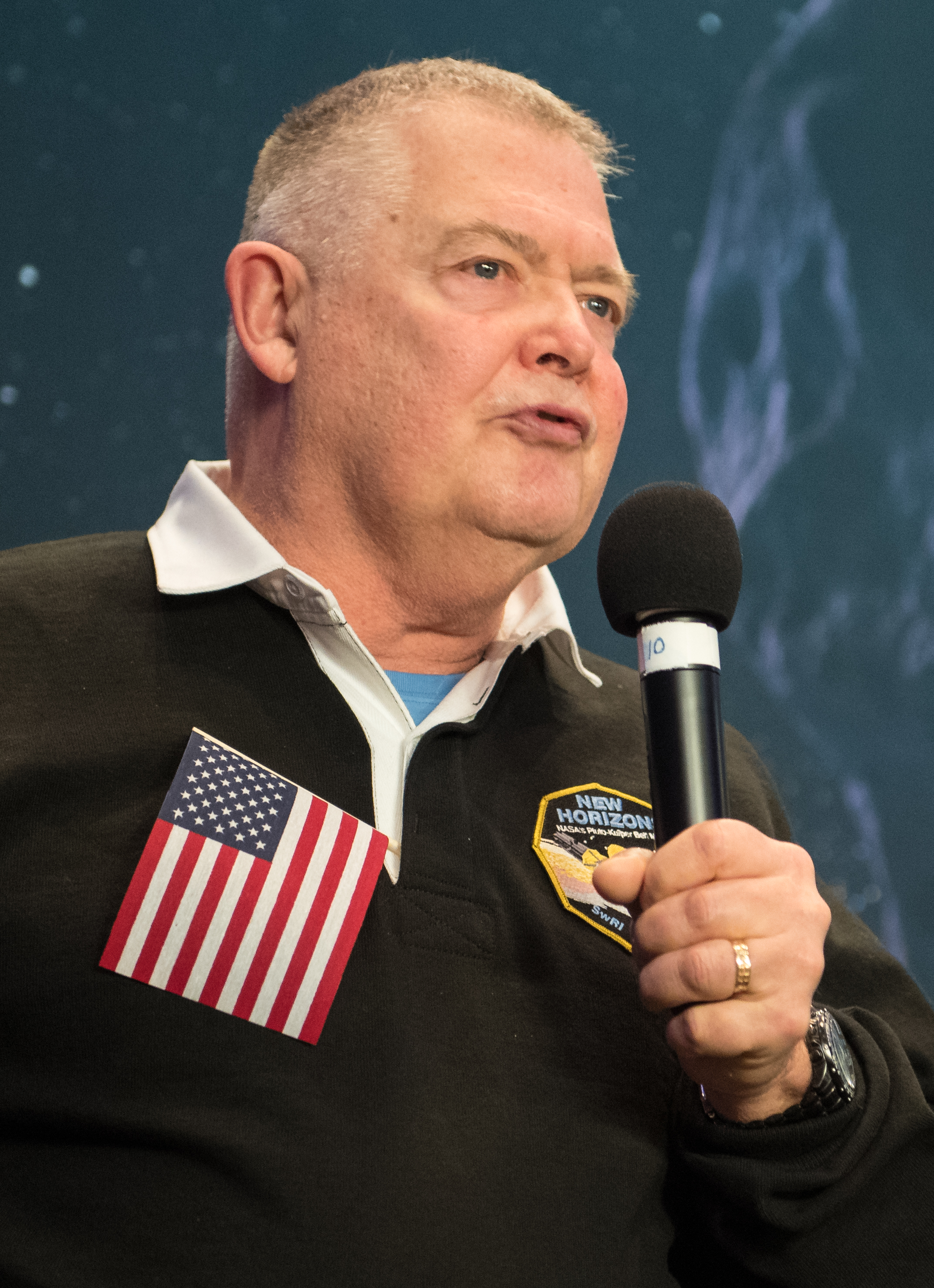
- Born: 1951 (age 74–75)
- Education: University of Florida; Duke University
- Known for: Being the Chief Engineer for the National Aeronautics and Space Administration
- Awards: NASA Exceptional Service Medal; NASA Medal for Outstanding Leadership; Robert Baumann Award; NASA Engineering and Safety Center Leadership Award
- Scientific career
- Fields: Engineer
- Workplaces: NASA; Applied Physics Laboratory

Michael Ryschkewitsch (/rɪsˈkeɪvɪtʃ/ riss-KAY-vitch; born 1951) is the former Space Exploration Sector Head at the Applied Physics Laboratory (APL). He formerly served as the Chief Engineer of the United States National Aeronautics and Space Administration.

== Education and career ==
Michael Ryschkewitsch earned a B.S. in physics from the University of Florida, Gainesville, and a Ph.D. in physics from Duke University. He joined the NASA Goddard Space Flight Center in 1982 to work as a cryogenics engineer on the Cosmic Background Explorer (COBE) mission. He worked on a number of other projects, including the first servicing mission for the Hubble Space Telescope. He later served as the chairperson of the Genesis spacecraft mishap investigation board, and discovered a test that Lockheed Martin had skipped that would have prevented the mishap.

Ryschkewitsch was eventually promoted to Deputy Director of Goddard Space Flight Center in 2005, and then to Chief Engineer of NASA in 2007. He was the third person in a row to go from Deputy Director of a NASA field center to Chief Engineer at NASA Headquarters, after Rex Geveden and Christopher Scolese; the first two were also then promoted to Associate Administrator of NASA.

== Awards and honors ==
Ryschkewitsch has been awarded the NASA Exceptional Service Medal, the NASA Medal for Outstanding Leadership, the Robert Baumann Award for contributions to mission success, and the NASA Engineering and Safety Center Leadership Award. Asteroid 182044 Ryschkewitsch was named in his honor. The official naming citation was published by the Minor Planet Center on 25 September 2018 (M.P.C. 111802).
