= Mid-air retrieval =

Assisted atmospheric re-entry technique

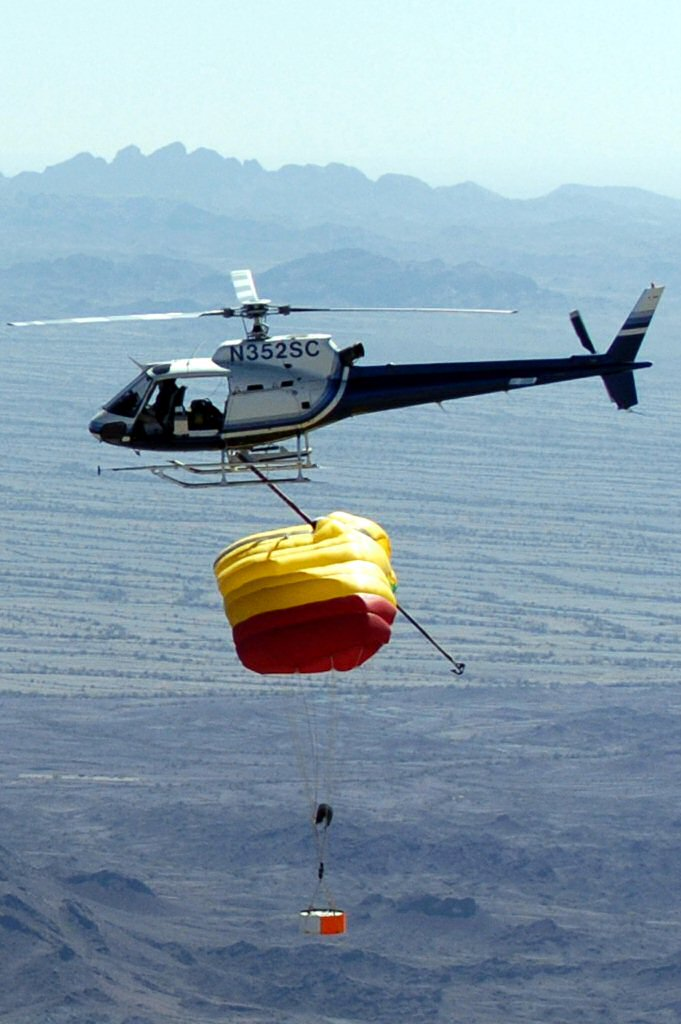
A helicopter with a long hook can catch a parachuting object in mid-air, as seen here in a practice run for the planned retrieval of Genesis.

Mid-air retrieval is a technique used in atmospheric reentry of a spacecraft when the re-entering vehicle is unable to land safely unassisted. The vehicle is slowed by parachutes, and then a specially-equipped aircraft catches it in mid-air.

It is a risky technique, and so is only used when other forms of landing are infeasible. Successful mid-air retrieval requires correct operation of the retrieving aircraft, favourable atmospheric conditions, and successful execution of a tricky manoeuvre, in addition to correct operation of the vehicle itself. These risks can be mitigated somewhat: for example, multiple recovery aircraft can be used. The need for human aviators to perform a maneuver which would normally be classed as a stunt may in the future be avoided by advances in unmanned aerial vehicles and spacecraft reentry.

== Notable uses ==
Notable uses of the technique:

- The first use of midair retrieval involved Fairchild C-119 Flying Boxcar transports, which were used to recover film capsules and instrument packages ejected from high-altitude reconnaissance balloons under programs such as Project Genetrix and Project Moby Dick in the early 1950s. The balloons were unmanned and released to float on the jet streams, photographing the Soviet Union, Eastern Europe, and China. Once they returned to friendly airspace, they would release their cameras, which would parachute down and be snagged in flight by the specially modified transport planes.
- Operational flights of the Ryan Firebee series of target and reconnaissance drones typically used midair recovery to minimize the damage to the drone in a ground landing. A transport helicopter, typically either an SH-3 Sea King or a CH-53 Sea Stallion, would use a trapeze-like device to snare the drone's drogue parachute before lowering it to the ground.
- The early-1960s era Corona reconnaissance satellite returned delicate film capsules to Earth that required mid-air retrieval by a specially modified aircraft. Early in the program, modified C-119 Flying Boxcar airlifters were used, replaced in 1961 by modified JC-130B Hercules and supplemented in 1966 with JC-130H. These aircraft were manned by a crew of 10. The crew consisted of two pilots, one flight engineer, two telemetry operators, one winch operator, and four riggers. The telemetry operators would determine the location of the satellite and relay the info to the pilots. One could visually acquire the satellite and its parachute at an altitude of approximately 50,000 ft (15,000 m). Once visually acquired, the pilots would head to the satellite descending towards the Pacific Ocean. The winch operator and the riggers would deploy the retrieving apparatus called the "Loop", which consisted of high-quality nylon rope with a series of brass hooks spliced into the apparatus. The winch operator and the four riggers would deploy the loop. Once contact was made between the parachute and the loop, the winch line would pay out and stop. The winch then was put into gear and the retrieval process commenced. Once the satellite was on board, the aircraft flew back to Hickam Air Force Base, where it was stationed. The satellite or canister was offloaded onto a truck and then loaded immediately onto a running C-141 airlifter and then transported to Maryland for analysis. The crews acquired these skills by practicing almost daily, with other aircraft dropping dummy bombs with chutes attached.
- The Soviet Union also experimented with midair retrieval during satellite recovery trials at the Gromov Flight Research Institute, though they do not appear to have used this technique operationally to a great extent. While little information exists on these experiments, it is known that at least one Antonov An-12 airplane was modified for the midair recovery role. A Mil Mi-8 transport helicopter was also modified for this task, possibly under the same program.
- The Sikorsky CH-37 Mojave was used to perform aerial recovery of missile nose cones at the White Sands Missile Range during the 1960s. This became a routine operational procedure, and from the 1960s onward many suborbital space payloads at White Sands and elsewhere were recovered in midair via helicopter.
- The Hiller Aircraft company at one point proposed to build an enormous helicopter with a rotor diameter of over 300 feet (91 m) for the task of recovering the first stage of the Saturn V moon rocket in order to re-use it. This was never built, as the need to re-use the first stage of the Saturn V never arose due to the scaling-back of the Apollo Applications Program.
- The Genesis space probe returned a sample of solar wind particles in a "particle trap" device that was so delicate that it would have been damaged by a parachute landing. This task called for a plan involving a mid-air retrieval, using helicopters flown by Hollywood stunt pilots contracted by NASA. Its parachutes failed to deploy, leading to a disastrous high speed impact with the desert floor, which shattered the trap's delicate wafers holding the solar wind particle samples. Despite the return capsule being damaged by the impact, the mission was declared a success after intact solar wind particles were salvaged from the wreckage.
- An early design for SpaceShipOne called for a shuttlecock-like shape that would have made it incapable of landing independently, necessitating mid-air retrieval. This was deemed too risky, and the final design made the spacecraft capable of independent horizontal landing while retaining the desired aerodynamic qualities for the early part of reentry.
- The Lockheed D-21 high-speed reconnaissance drone was designed to be disposable, ejecting a camera capsule at the end of its mission and then self-destructing. This capsule would then be recovered in midair by a JC-130B Hercules. However, the D-21 met with very little success, and only a handful of missions were successfully recovered.
- The ALARR (Air Launched, Air Recoverable Rocket), an upper-atmosphere sounding rocket developed from the AIR-2 Genie air-to-air missile, was launched from an F-4 Phantom fighter, and then recovered in midair by a C-130 Hercules using the same technique used for the Corona satellites, spy balloons, and the D-21.
- The United Launch Alliance's Vulcan rocket was at one point intended to have the main engine section of its first stage recovered in midair by helicopter so that it could be reused for further launches.
- NASA's Wallops Island Flight Facility operated a Shorts Skyvan airplane nicknamed the “Ugly Hooker”, which was used between 1979 and 1995 to perform midair recovery of payloads ejected from high-altitude research balloons.
- The Dynetics X-61 reconnaissance drone is intended to be launched from a carrier aircraft and recovered in midair after their mission by a modified C-130 Hercules, using a device similar to that previously used to recover film capsules from spy satellites. On the X-61's first flight, on January 17, 2020, the drone's main parachute failed to open, and the midair recovery failed, resulting in the loss of the drone. Subsequent test flights have resulted in successful retrievals.
- US-New Zealand aerospace company Rocket Lab has announced plans to recover their Electron rocket for reuse by helicopter. The first successful midair recovery of an Electron booster was made on 3 May 2022, using a Sikorsky S-92 as the recovery aircraft.

== Image gallery ==
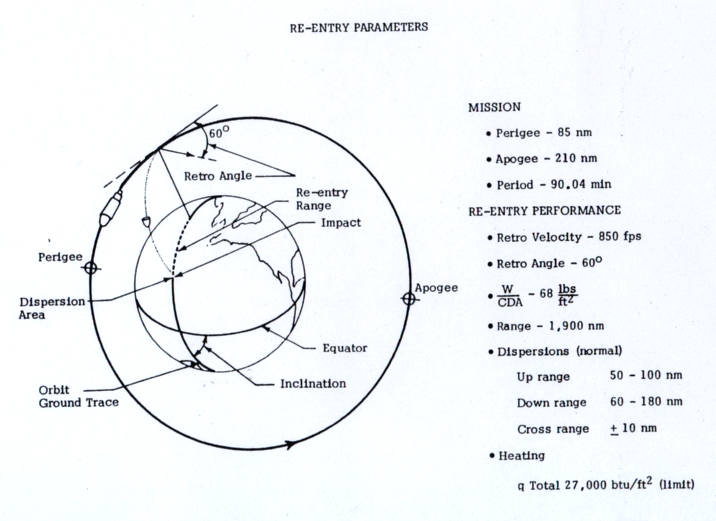
CORONA re-entry parameters

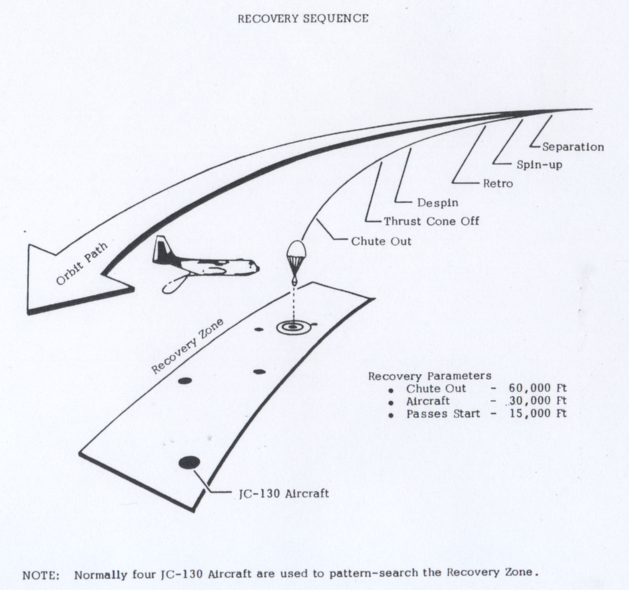
CORONA recovery sequence

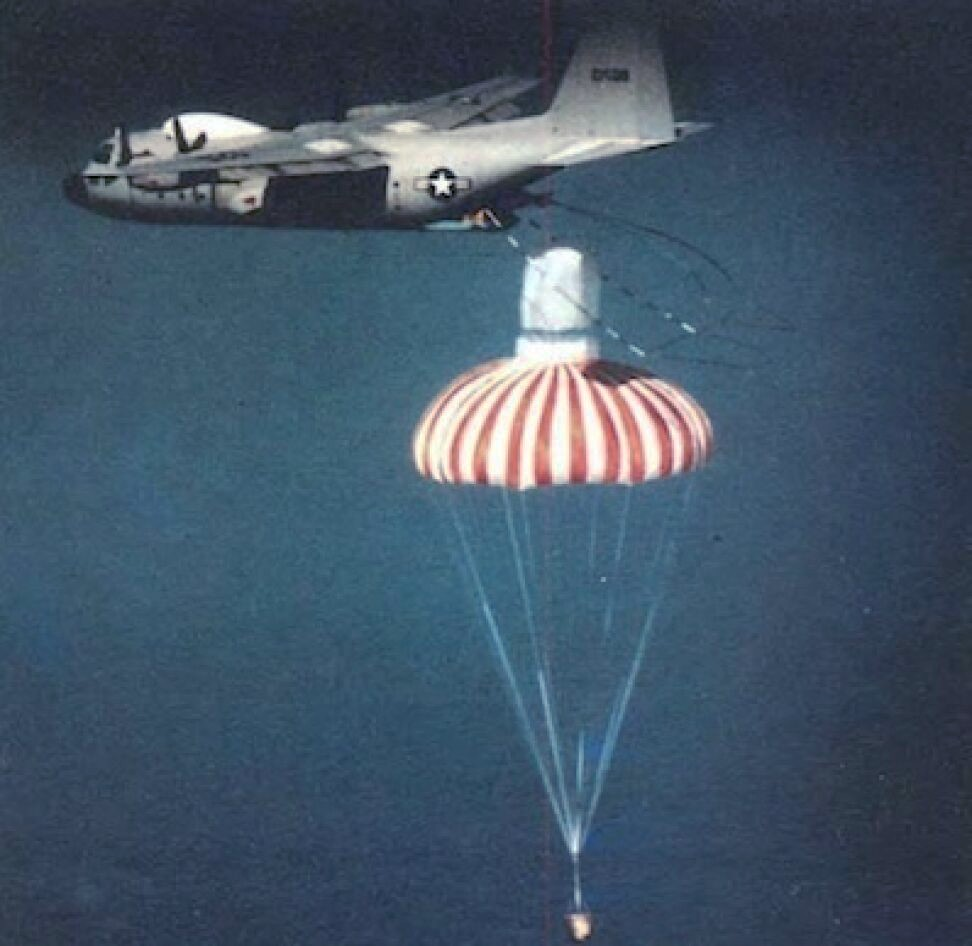
Key Hole film recovery by JC-130

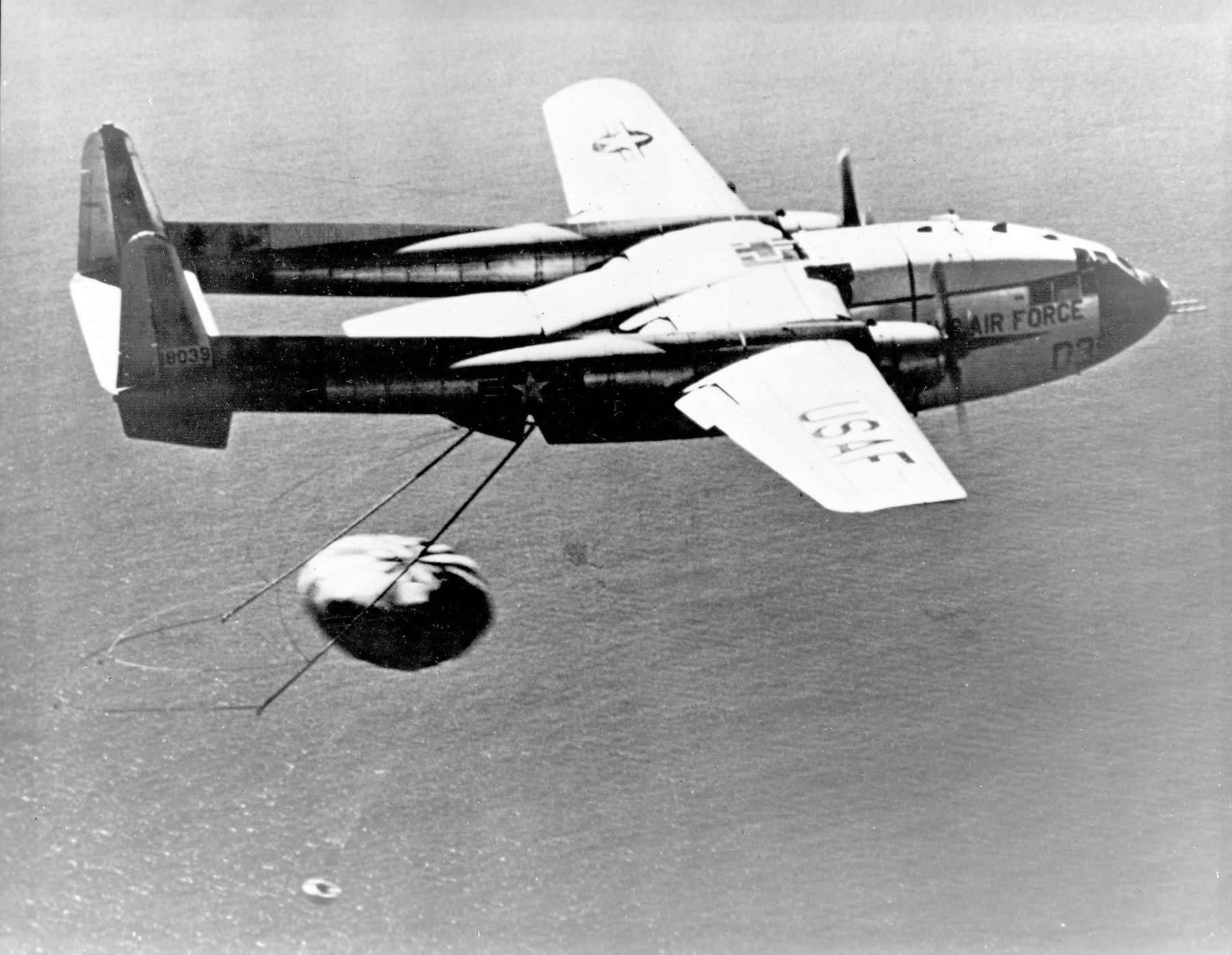
C-119 recovers

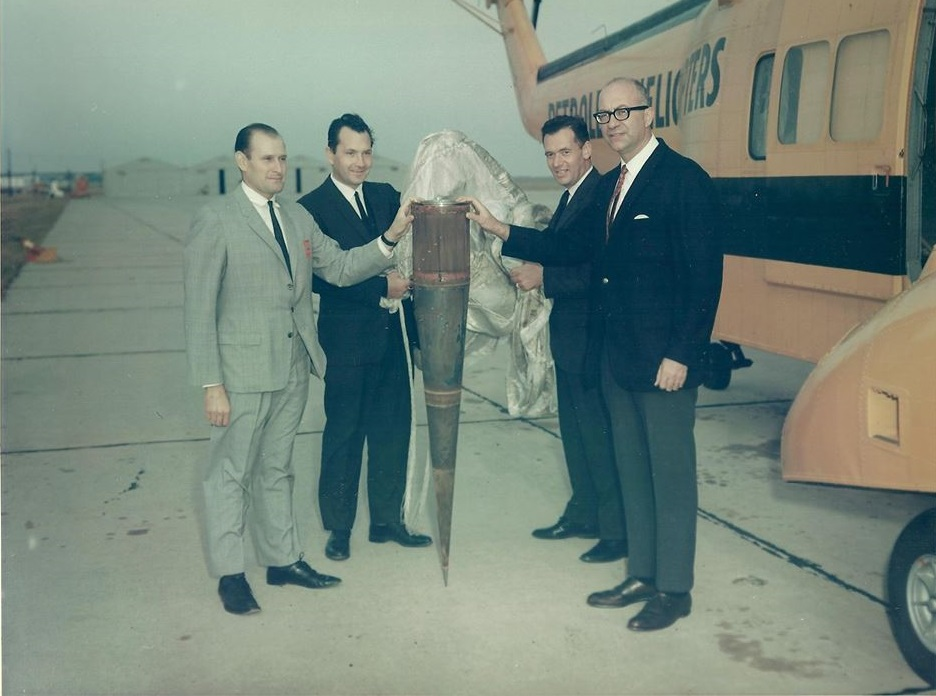
Payload from an Orión-2 sounding rocket following midair recovery at Wallops Island (November 1966)

== See also ==
- Airborne aircraft carrier
- Fulton surface-to-air recovery system, sometimes nicknamed "Skyhook"
- Glider snatch pick-up
