= 27270 Guidotti =

Main-belt asteroid

Discovery
- Discovered by: L. Tesi; A. Caronia
- Discovery site: San Marcello Obs.
- Discovery date: 2 January 2000

Designations
- Named after: Guido Guidotti (Italian amateur astronomer)
- Alternative designations: 2000 AY_{4} · 1995 YH_{24} 1998 SS_{103}
- Minor planet category: main-belt · (inner) background

Orbital characteristics
- Epoch 4 September 2017 (JD 2458000.5)
- Uncertainty parameter 0
- Observation arc: 25.95 yr (9,479 days)
- Aphelion: 2.6014 AU
- Perihelion: 2.2912 AU
- Semi-major axis: 2.4463 AU
- Eccentricity: 0.0634
- Orbital period (sidereal): 3.83 yr (1,398 days)
- Mean anomaly: 142.12°
- Mean motion: 0° 15^{m} 27.36^{s} / day
- Inclination: 2.7846°
- Longitude of ascending node: 107.85°
- Argument of perihelion: 95.008°

Physical characteristics
- Mean diameter: 3.74 km (calculated); 6.9 km (est. at 0.06)
- Synodic rotation period: 2.6 h
- Geometric albedo: 0.20 (assumed)
- Spectral type: C · C (SDSS-MFB)
- Absolute magnitude (H): 14.46±0.28 · 14.5

27270 Guidotti (provisional designation 2000 AY_{4}) is a carbonaceous background asteroid from the inner regions of the asteroid belt, approximately 7 kilometres in diameter. It was discovered on 2 January 2000, by Italian astronomers Luciano Tesi and Alfredo Caronia at the Pistoia Mountains Astronomical Observatory in San Marcello Pistoiese, Italy. The asteroid was named after amateur astronomer Guido Guidotti.

== Orbit and classification ==
Guidotti is a non-family from the main belt's background population. It orbits the Sun in the inner asteroid belt at a distance of 2.3–2.6 AU once every 3 years and 10 months (1,398 days). Its orbit has an eccentricity of 0.06 and an inclination of 3° with respect to the ecliptic.

The body's observation arc begins with a precovery from the Digitized Sky Survey taken at Palomar Observatory in October 1991, more than 8 years prior to its official discovery observation at San Marcello in 2000.

== Physical characteristics ==
Guidotti has been characterized as a carbonaceous C-type asteroid by Pan-STARRS photometric survey, as well as by SDSS-MFB (Masi Foglia Bus).

=== Rotation period ===
In March 2008, a rotational lightcurve of Guidotti was obtained from photometric observations by Slovak astronomers Adrian Galad and Leonard Kornoš. Analysis of the fragmentary lightcurve gave a rotation period of 2.6 hours with a brightness amplitude of 0.3 magnitude (U=1). As of 2017, no secure period has been obtained.

=== Diameter and albedo ===
Guidotti has not been observed by any of the spaced-based surveys such as the NEOWISE mission of NASA's Wide-field Infrared Survey Explorer, the Japanese Akari satellite or the Infrared Astronomical Satellite.

The Collaborative Asteroid Lightcurve Link assumes a standard albedo for stony asteroids of 0.20 and calculates a diameter of 3.74 kilometres based on an absolute magnitude of 14.5. Based on a generic magnitude-to-diameter conversion, using a typical albedo for carbonaceous asteroids of 0.06, Guidotti measures 6.9 kilometres in diameter.

== Naming ==
This minor planet was named after Guido Guidotti (born 1946), an Italian amateur astronomer and founder of the Association of Astronomy "A. Pieri" (Italian: Associazione Astrofili Valdinievole "A. Pieri"), in Valdinievole, Tuscany, Italy. He is an observer of asteroids and comets, and an organizer of lectures and exhibitions on astronomical subjects. The official naming citation was published by the Minor Planet Center on 26 November 2004 (M.P.C. 53176).
