= Daria Guidetti =

Italian astrophysicist

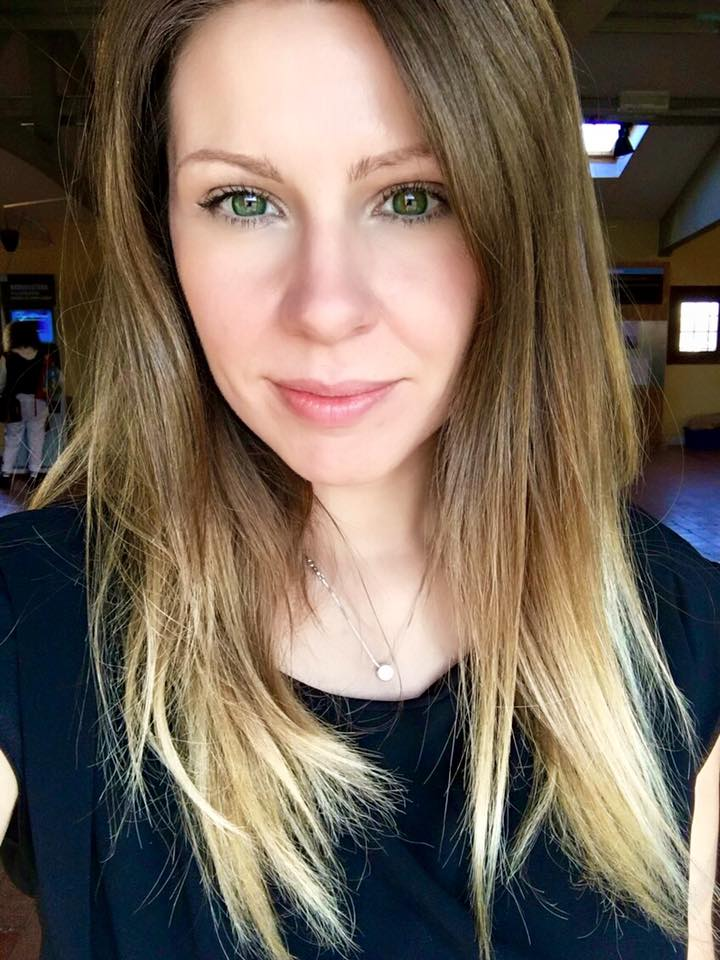
Guidetti in 2016

Minor planets discovered: 2
34004 Gregorini	30 July 2000
49443 Marcobondi	22 December 1998

Daria Guidetti (born 1978) is an Italian astrophysicist linked to the INAF. She studied astronomy at the University of Bologna and is a member of the astronomy club at Montelupo Fiorentino (Italian: Gruppo Astrofili Montelupo). The Minor Planet Center credits her with the co-discovery of two asteroids, 34004 Gregorini and 49443 Marcobondi, discovered at the Montelupo Observatory (108) in 1998 and 2000, in collaboration with Italian astronomers Maura Tombelli and Egisto Masotti, respectively.

At the end of 2016, she made her debut as a correspondent at the stadium for the sports TV show Quelli che il calcio, airing on Rai 2, to follow Empoli Football Club matches. In 2018, she made her debut as author and presenter of the TV programme Destinazione spazio (Destination Space) on the local TV station Reteconomy.

In December 2019, Guidetti published the volume Campi magnetici (Magnetic Fields) in the series Viaggio nell'Universo (Journey into the Universe), published by Corriere della Sera. On 14 May 2021, asteroid 27005 Dariaguidetti, discovered by astronomers Giuseppe Forti and Maura Tombelli at Cima Ekar Observing Station in 1998, was named in her honour.
