= List of minor planets: 182001–183000 =

The following is a partial list of minor planets, running from minor-planet number 182001 through 183000, inclusive. The primary data for this and other partial lists is based on JPL's "Small-Body Orbital Elements" and data available from the Minor Planet Center. Critical list information is also provided by the MPC, unless otherwise specified from Lowell Observatory. A detailed description of the table's columns and additional sources are given on the main page including a complete list of every page in this series, and a statistical break-up on the dynamical classification of minor planets.

Also see the summary list of all named bodies in numerical and alphabetical order, and the corresponding naming citations for the number range of this particular list. New namings may only be added to this list after official publication, as the preannouncement of names is condemned by the Working Group for Small Bodies Nomenclature of the International Astronomical Union.

| Near-Earth obj. | MBA (inner) | MBA (outer) | Centaur |
| Mars-crosser | MBA (middle) | Jupiter trojan | Trans-Neptunian obj. |
| Unclassified |

== 182001–182100 ==
| Designation | | | Discovery | | | Properties | | Ref |
| Permanent | Provisional | Named after | Date | Site | Discoverer(s) | Category | Diam. | Ref |
|---|---|---|---|---|---|---|---|---|
| 182001 | 1999 WQ_{23} | — | November 17, 1999 | Kitt Peak | Spacewatch | · | 1.3 km | MPC · JPL |
| 182002 | 1999 XV_{7} | — | December 4, 1999 | Oaxaca | Roe, J. M. | · | 1.4 km | MPC · JPL |
| 182003 | 1999 XE_{14} | — | December 5, 1999 | Socorro | LINEAR | V | 920 m | MPC · JPL |
| 182004 | 1999 XK_{17} | — | December 7, 1999 | Socorro | LINEAR | H | 900 m | MPC · JPL |
| 182005 | 1999 XR_{26} | — | December 6, 1999 | Socorro | LINEAR | · | 1.1 km | MPC · JPL |
| 182006 | 1999 XJ_{45} | — | December 7, 1999 | Socorro | LINEAR | · | 5.0 km | MPC · JPL |
| 182007 | 1999 XR_{48} | — | December 7, 1999 | Socorro | LINEAR | · | 1.7 km | MPC · JPL |
| 182008 | 1999 XE_{69} | — | December 7, 1999 | Socorro | LINEAR | · | 1.3 km | MPC · JPL |
| 182009 | 1999 XZ_{122} | — | December 7, 1999 | Catalina | CSS | · | 5.5 km | MPC · JPL |
| 182010 | 1999 XT_{133} | — | December 12, 1999 | Socorro | LINEAR | · | 1.6 km | MPC · JPL |
| 182011 | 1999 XL_{159} | — | December 8, 1999 | Socorro | LINEAR | · | 3.2 km | MPC · JPL |
| 182012 | 1999 XY_{218} | — | December 15, 1999 | Kitt Peak | Spacewatch | · | 1.4 km | MPC · JPL |
| 182013 | 1999 XR_{225} | — | December 13, 1999 | Kitt Peak | Spacewatch | · | 1.5 km | MPC · JPL |
| 182014 | 1999 XC_{226} | — | December 14, 1999 | Kitt Peak | Spacewatch | · | 1.8 km | MPC · JPL |
| 182015 | 1999 XH_{248} | — | December 6, 1999 | Socorro | LINEAR | · | 3.5 km | MPC · JPL |
| 182016 | 1999 XF_{255} | — | December 12, 1999 | Kitt Peak | Spacewatch | · | 2.3 km | MPC · JPL |
| 182017 | 1999 YO_{7} | — | December 27, 1999 | Kitt Peak | Spacewatch | · | 1.5 km | MPC · JPL |
| 182018 | 1999 YA_{8} | — | December 27, 1999 | Kitt Peak | Spacewatch | · | 1.2 km | MPC · JPL |
| 182019 | 1999 YF_{14} | — | December 31, 1999 | Kitt Peak | Spacewatch | · | 1.4 km | MPC · JPL |
| 182020 | 1999 YZ_{16} | — | December 31, 1999 | Kitt Peak | Spacewatch | NYS | 1.7 km | MPC · JPL |
| 182021 | 2000 AU_{5} | — | January 4, 2000 | Kitt Peak | Spacewatch | · | 1.5 km | MPC · JPL |
| 182022 | 2000 AD_{27} | — | January 3, 2000 | Socorro | LINEAR | NYS | 1.9 km | MPC · JPL |
| 182023 | 2000 AG_{27} | — | January 3, 2000 | Socorro | LINEAR | NYS | 1.7 km | MPC · JPL |
| 182024 | 2000 AB_{90} | — | January 5, 2000 | Socorro | LINEAR | · | 2.2 km | MPC · JPL |
| 182025 | 2000 AV_{100} | — | January 5, 2000 | Socorro | LINEAR | TIR | 6.4 km | MPC · JPL |
| 182026 | 2000 AQ_{113} | — | January 5, 2000 | Socorro | LINEAR | · | 1.8 km | MPC · JPL |
| 182027 | 2000 AJ_{145} | — | January 6, 2000 | Socorro | LINEAR | MAS | 1.1 km | MPC · JPL |
| 182028 | 2000 AL_{194} | — | January 8, 2000 | Socorro | LINEAR | slow | 2.6 km | MPC · JPL |
| 182029 | 2000 BV_{4} | — | January 21, 2000 | Socorro | LINEAR | · | 1.8 km | MPC · JPL |
| 182030 | 2000 BJ_{7} | — | January 29, 2000 | Socorro | LINEAR | · | 2.7 km | MPC · JPL |
| 182031 | 2000 BJ_{13} | — | January 29, 2000 | Kitt Peak | Spacewatch | · | 1.4 km | MPC · JPL |
| 182032 | 2000 BN_{13} | — | January 29, 2000 | Kitt Peak | Spacewatch | · | 1.7 km | MPC · JPL |
| 182033 | 2000 CJ_{15} | — | February 2, 2000 | Socorro | LINEAR | · | 2.1 km | MPC · JPL |
| 182034 | 2000 CS_{21} | — | February 2, 2000 | Socorro | LINEAR | · | 2.1 km | MPC · JPL |
| 182035 | 2000 CY_{38} | — | February 3, 2000 | Socorro | LINEAR | · | 1.9 km | MPC · JPL |
| 182036 | 2000 CV_{43} | — | February 2, 2000 | Socorro | LINEAR | · | 2.7 km | MPC · JPL |
| 182037 | 2000 CE_{52} | — | February 2, 2000 | Socorro | LINEAR | · | 2.3 km | MPC · JPL |
| 182038 | 2000 CL_{64} | — | February 3, 2000 | Socorro | LINEAR | · | 2.0 km | MPC · JPL |
| 182039 | 2000 CR_{67} | — | February 1, 2000 | Kitt Peak | Spacewatch | MAS | 970 m | MPC · JPL |
| 182040 | 2000 CD_{72} | — | February 7, 2000 | Kitt Peak | Spacewatch | (5) | 1.4 km | MPC · JPL |
| 182041 | 2000 CX_{73} | — | February 7, 2000 | Kitt Peak | Spacewatch | · | 1.2 km | MPC · JPL |
| 182042 | 2000 CE_{88} | — | February 4, 2000 | Socorro | LINEAR | · | 2.2 km | MPC · JPL |
| 182043 | 2000 CH_{96} | — | February 11, 2000 | Kitt Peak | Spacewatch | · | 1.5 km | MPC · JPL |
| 182044 Ryschkewitsch | 2000 CV_{109} | Ryschkewitsch | February 5, 2000 | Kitt Peak | M. W. Buie | MAS | 1.2 km | MPC · JPL |
| 182045 | 2000 CC_{131} | — | February 3, 2000 | Kitt Peak | Spacewatch | · | 1.8 km | MPC · JPL |
| 182046 | 2000 CL_{147} | — | February 11, 2000 | Socorro | LINEAR | · | 2.5 km | MPC · JPL |
| 182047 | 2000 CE_{149} | — | February 8, 2000 | Kitt Peak | Spacewatch | V | 1.0 km | MPC · JPL |
| 182048 | 2000 DU_{16} | — | February 29, 2000 | Socorro | LINEAR | H | 800 m | MPC · JPL |
| 182049 | 2000 DY_{36} | — | February 29, 2000 | Socorro | LINEAR | · | 3.1 km | MPC · JPL |
| 182050 | 2000 DF_{40} | — | February 29, 2000 | Socorro | LINEAR | · | 1.9 km | MPC · JPL |
| 182051 | 2000 DP_{47} | — | February 29, 2000 | Socorro | LINEAR | MAS | 1.3 km | MPC · JPL |
| 182052 | 2000 DD_{49} | — | February 29, 2000 | Socorro | LINEAR | · | 1.1 km | MPC · JPL |
| 182053 | 2000 DM_{61} | — | February 29, 2000 | Socorro | LINEAR | · | 2.1 km | MPC · JPL |
| 182054 | 2000 DG_{89} | — | February 26, 2000 | Kitt Peak | Spacewatch | · | 1.6 km | MPC · JPL |
| 182055 | 2000 DA_{92} | — | February 27, 2000 | Kitt Peak | Spacewatch | · | 1.6 km | MPC · JPL |
| 182056 | 2000 DD_{93} | — | February 28, 2000 | Socorro | LINEAR | · | 2.5 km | MPC · JPL |
| 182057 | 2000 DY_{103} | — | February 29, 2000 | Socorro | LINEAR | · | 4.0 km | MPC · JPL |
| 182058 | 2000 DN_{108} | — | February 29, 2000 | Socorro | LINEAR | V | 1.1 km | MPC · JPL |
| 182059 | 2000 DQ_{114} | — | February 28, 2000 | Kitt Peak | Spacewatch | · | 1.7 km | MPC · JPL |
| 182060 | 2000 DL_{116} | — | February 25, 2000 | Catalina | CSS | · | 2.2 km | MPC · JPL |
| 182061 | 2000 EU_{3} | — | March 3, 2000 | Socorro | LINEAR | · | 1.4 km | MPC · JPL |
| 182062 | 2000 ET_{15} | — | March 3, 2000 | Kitt Peak | Spacewatch | 3:2 · SHU | 5.9 km | MPC · JPL |
| 182063 | 2000 EZ_{55} | — | March 5, 2000 | Socorro | LINEAR | · | 1.5 km | MPC · JPL |
| 182064 | 2000 EC_{79} | — | March 5, 2000 | Socorro | LINEAR | · | 2.3 km | MPC · JPL |
| 182065 | 2000 EH_{154} | — | March 6, 2000 | Haleakala | NEAT | · | 1.8 km | MPC · JPL |
| 182066 | 2000 EF_{159} | — | March 3, 2000 | Socorro | LINEAR | · | 1.6 km | MPC · JPL |
| 182067 | 2000 FS_{7} | — | March 29, 2000 | Socorro | LINEAR | H | 920 m | MPC · JPL |
| 182068 | 2000 FX_{54} | — | March 30, 2000 | Kitt Peak | Spacewatch | · | 3.3 km | MPC · JPL |
| 182069 | 2000 GR_{27} | — | April 5, 2000 | Socorro | LINEAR | 3:2 · SHU | 8.0 km | MPC · JPL |
| 182070 | 2000 GC_{47} | — | April 5, 2000 | Socorro | LINEAR | MAR | 1.7 km | MPC · JPL |
| 182071 | 2000 GJ_{67} | — | April 5, 2000 | Socorro | LINEAR | · | 2.1 km | MPC · JPL |
| 182072 | 2000 GX_{81} | — | April 7, 2000 | Socorro | LINEAR | H | 1 km | MPC · JPL |
| 182073 | 2000 GZ_{81} | — | April 7, 2000 | Socorro | LINEAR | · | 1.6 km | MPC · JPL |
| 182074 | 2000 GC_{119} | — | April 3, 2000 | Kitt Peak | Spacewatch | · | 2.0 km | MPC · JPL |
| 182075 | 2000 GM_{119} | — | April 3, 2000 | Kitt Peak | Spacewatch | · | 1.6 km | MPC · JPL |
| 182076 | 2000 GH_{130} | — | April 5, 2000 | Kitt Peak | Spacewatch | · | 1.4 km | MPC · JPL |
| 182077 | 2000 GA_{131} | — | April 7, 2000 | Kitt Peak | Spacewatch | · | 4.1 km | MPC · JPL |
| 182078 | 2000 GS_{170} | — | April 5, 2000 | Anderson Mesa | LONEOS | H | 650 m | MPC · JPL |
| 182079 | 2000 HD_{1} | — | April 24, 2000 | Kitt Peak | Spacewatch | · | 1.2 km | MPC · JPL |
| 182080 | 2000 HA_{2} | — | April 25, 2000 | Kitt Peak | Spacewatch | · | 1.4 km | MPC · JPL |
| 182081 | 2000 HC_{2} | — | April 25, 2000 | Kitt Peak | Spacewatch | · | 1.6 km | MPC · JPL |
| 182082 | 2000 HD_{8} | — | April 27, 2000 | Socorro | LINEAR | · | 1.8 km | MPC · JPL |
| 182083 | 2000 HS_{51} | — | April 29, 2000 | Socorro | LINEAR | · | 2.1 km | MPC · JPL |
| 182084 | 2000 HL_{58} | — | April 25, 2000 | Anderson Mesa | LONEOS | H | 730 m | MPC · JPL |
| 182085 | 2000 HN_{59} | — | April 25, 2000 | Anderson Mesa | LONEOS | · | 2.1 km | MPC · JPL |
| 182086 | 2000 HW_{68} | — | April 29, 2000 | Socorro | LINEAR | · | 1.3 km | MPC · JPL |
| 182087 | 2000 HH_{81} | — | April 28, 2000 | Anderson Mesa | LONEOS | H | 940 m | MPC · JPL |
| 182088 | 2000 HV_{83} | — | April 30, 2000 | Anderson Mesa | LONEOS | H | 920 m | MPC · JPL |
| 182089 | 2000 JK_{7} | — | May 1, 2000 | Kitt Peak | Spacewatch | KOR | 1.9 km | MPC · JPL |
| 182090 | 2000 JH_{10} | — | May 4, 2000 | Socorro | LINEAR | H | 870 m | MPC · JPL |
| 182091 | 2000 JD_{13} | — | May 6, 2000 | Socorro | LINEAR | · | 1.7 km | MPC · JPL |
| 182092 | 2000 JE_{41} | — | May 6, 2000 | Socorro | LINEAR | · | 1.9 km | MPC · JPL |
| 182093 | 2000 JJ_{43} | — | May 7, 2000 | Socorro | LINEAR | · | 1.4 km | MPC · JPL |
| 182094 | 2000 JK_{68} | — | May 7, 2000 | Kitt Peak | Spacewatch | 3:2 | 6.8 km | MPC · JPL |
| 182095 | 2000 JX_{68} | — | May 9, 2000 | Kitt Peak | Spacewatch | · | 1.8 km | MPC · JPL |
| 182096 | 2000 JF_{80} | — | May 6, 2000 | Kitt Peak | Spacewatch | · | 1.5 km | MPC · JPL |
| 182097 | 2000 KV_{11} | — | May 28, 2000 | Socorro | LINEAR | · | 1.5 km | MPC · JPL |
| 182098 | 2000 KO_{31} | — | May 28, 2000 | Socorro | LINEAR | · | 2.1 km | MPC · JPL |
| 182099 | 2000 KJ_{49} | — | May 30, 2000 | Kitt Peak | Spacewatch | · | 1.4 km | MPC · JPL |
| 182100 | 2000 KX_{52} | — | May 25, 2000 | Anderson Mesa | LONEOS | · | 2.0 km | MPC · JPL |

== 182101–182200 ==
back to top

| Designation | | | Discovery | | | Properties | | Ref |
| Permanent | Provisional | Named after | Date | Site | Discoverer(s) | Category | Diam. | Ref |
|---|---|---|---|---|---|---|---|---|
| 182101 | 2000 KM_{59} | — | May 25, 2000 | Anderson Mesa | LONEOS | · | 2.2 km | MPC · JPL |
| 182102 | 2000 LX_{22} | — | June 6, 2000 | Kitt Peak | Spacewatch | · | 2.9 km | MPC · JPL |
| 182103 | 2000 NN_{13} | — | July 5, 2000 | Anderson Mesa | LONEOS | · | 4.6 km | MPC · JPL |
| 182104 | 2000 NT_{20} | — | July 6, 2000 | Kitt Peak | Spacewatch | MIS | 4.2 km | MPC · JPL |
| 182105 | 2000 OR_{17} | — | July 23, 2000 | Socorro | LINEAR | · | 1.9 km | MPC · JPL |
| 182106 | 2000 OT_{34} | — | July 30, 2000 | Socorro | LINEAR | · | 2.6 km | MPC · JPL |
| 182107 | 2000 OC_{35} | — | July 30, 2000 | Socorro | LINEAR | · | 2.7 km | MPC · JPL |
| 182108 | 2000 PY_{6} | — | August 6, 2000 | Ametlla de Mar | J. Nomen | · | 4.1 km | MPC · JPL |
| 182109 | 2000 QL_{3} | — | August 24, 2000 | Socorro | LINEAR | · | 3.6 km | MPC · JPL |
| 182110 | 2000 QE_{19} | — | August 24, 2000 | Socorro | LINEAR | · | 2.6 km | MPC · JPL |
| 182111 | 2000 QZ_{35} | — | August 24, 2000 | Socorro | LINEAR | ADE | 3.8 km | MPC · JPL |
| 182112 | 2000 QL_{37} | — | August 24, 2000 | Socorro | LINEAR | · | 2.4 km | MPC · JPL |
| 182113 | 2000 QH_{104} | — | August 28, 2000 | Socorro | LINEAR | JUN | 2.2 km | MPC · JPL |
| 182114 | 2000 QC_{119} | — | August 25, 2000 | Socorro | LINEAR | · | 3.9 km | MPC · JPL |
| 182115 | 2000 QL_{141} | — | August 31, 2000 | Socorro | LINEAR | DOR | 3.7 km | MPC · JPL |
| 182116 | 2000 QM_{161} | — | August 31, 2000 | Socorro | LINEAR | · | 3.6 km | MPC · JPL |
| 182117 | 2000 QF_{168} | — | August 31, 2000 | Socorro | LINEAR | · | 2.5 km | MPC · JPL |
| 182118 | 2000 QF_{170} | — | August 31, 2000 | Socorro | LINEAR | · | 3.0 km | MPC · JPL |
| 182119 | 2000 QH_{186} | — | August 26, 2000 | Socorro | LINEAR | · | 2.8 km | MPC · JPL |
| 182120 | 2000 QW_{189} | — | August 26, 2000 | Socorro | LINEAR | · | 1.5 km | MPC · JPL |
| 182121 | 2000 QL_{227} | — | August 31, 2000 | Socorro | LINEAR | L5 | 13 km | MPC · JPL |
| 182122 Sepan | 2000 QY_{234} | Sepan | August 26, 2000 | Cerro Tololo | M. W. Buie | · | 2.3 km | MPC · JPL |
| 182123 | 2000 RA_{21} | — | September 1, 2000 | Socorro | LINEAR | · | 4.0 km | MPC · JPL |
| 182124 | 2000 RY_{23} | — | September 1, 2000 | Socorro | LINEAR | · | 4.8 km | MPC · JPL |
| 182125 | 2000 RK_{26} | — | September 1, 2000 | Socorro | LINEAR | EOS | 3.5 km | MPC · JPL |
| 182126 | 2000 RJ_{38} | — | September 5, 2000 | Kvistaberg | Uppsala-DLR Asteroid Survey | · | 2.8 km | MPC · JPL |
| 182127 | 2000 RJ_{70} | — | September 2, 2000 | Socorro | LINEAR | · | 2.4 km | MPC · JPL |
| 182128 | 2000 RC_{72} | — | September 2, 2000 | Socorro | LINEAR | TIR | 5.0 km | MPC · JPL |
| 182129 | 2000 RR_{99} | — | September 5, 2000 | Anderson Mesa | LONEOS | EUP | 7.4 km | MPC · JPL |
| 182130 | 2000 SY_{15} | — | September 23, 2000 | Socorro | LINEAR | EOS | 3.3 km | MPC · JPL |
| 182131 | 2000 SD_{17} | — | September 23, 2000 | Socorro | LINEAR | · | 2.9 km | MPC · JPL |
| 182132 | 2000 SG_{17} | — | September 23, 2000 | Socorro | LINEAR | · | 4.2 km | MPC · JPL |
| 182133 | 2000 SO_{23} | — | September 26, 2000 | Tebbutt | F. B. Zoltowski | GEF | 2.1 km | MPC · JPL |
| 182134 | 2000 SL_{25} | — | September 23, 2000 | Socorro | LINEAR | · | 3.6 km | MPC · JPL |
| 182135 | 2000 SP_{27} | — | September 23, 2000 | Socorro | LINEAR | (1338) (FLO) | 1.1 km | MPC · JPL |
| 182136 | 2000 ST_{29} | — | September 24, 2000 | Socorro | LINEAR | · | 2.9 km | MPC · JPL |
| 182137 | 2000 SA_{31} | — | September 24, 2000 | Socorro | LINEAR | · | 3.2 km | MPC · JPL |
| 182138 | 2000 SJ_{33} | — | September 24, 2000 | Socorro | LINEAR | MRX | 1.8 km | MPC · JPL |
| 182139 | 2000 SM_{33} | — | September 24, 2000 | Socorro | LINEAR | MRX | 1.6 km | MPC · JPL |
| 182140 | 2000 SX_{42} | — | September 25, 2000 | Črni Vrh | Mikuž, H. | · | 3.2 km | MPC · JPL |
| 182141 | 2000 SZ_{43} | — | September 23, 2000 | Socorro | LINEAR | · | 3.5 km | MPC · JPL |
| 182142 | 2000 SN_{44} | — | September 27, 2000 | Socorro | LINEAR | T_{j} (2.98) | 8.4 km | MPC · JPL |
| 182143 | 2000 SQ_{45} | — | September 22, 2000 | Socorro | LINEAR | · | 3.7 km | MPC · JPL |
| 182144 | 2000 SN_{47} | — | September 23, 2000 | Socorro | LINEAR | · | 2.4 km | MPC · JPL |
| 182145 | 2000 SR_{49} | — | September 23, 2000 | Socorro | LINEAR | · | 3.2 km | MPC · JPL |
| 182146 | 2000 ST_{57} | — | September 24, 2000 | Socorro | LINEAR | · | 3.1 km | MPC · JPL |
| 182147 | 2000 SJ_{60} | — | September 24, 2000 | Socorro | LINEAR | · | 3.5 km | MPC · JPL |
| 182148 | 2000 SB_{64} | — | September 24, 2000 | Socorro | LINEAR | · | 4.0 km | MPC · JPL |
| 182149 | 2000 SN_{65} | — | September 24, 2000 | Socorro | LINEAR | · | 3.7 km | MPC · JPL |
| 182150 | 2000 SK_{68} | — | September 24, 2000 | Socorro | LINEAR | GEF | 2.1 km | MPC · JPL |
| 182151 | 2000 SK_{70} | — | September 24, 2000 | Socorro | LINEAR | · | 3.6 km | MPC · JPL |
| 182152 | 2000 SM_{73} | — | September 24, 2000 | Socorro | LINEAR | · | 2.5 km | MPC · JPL |
| 182153 | 2000 SU_{77} | — | September 24, 2000 | Socorro | LINEAR | · | 2.7 km | MPC · JPL |
| 182154 | 2000 SF_{78} | — | September 24, 2000 | Socorro | LINEAR | · | 3.3 km | MPC · JPL |
| 182155 | 2000 SB_{84} | — | September 24, 2000 | Socorro | LINEAR | EMA | 6.1 km | MPC · JPL |
| 182156 | 2000 SG_{87} | — | September 24, 2000 | Socorro | LINEAR | DOR | 3.9 km | MPC · JPL |
| 182157 | 2000 SF_{103} | — | September 24, 2000 | Socorro | LINEAR | · | 3.0 km | MPC · JPL |
| 182158 | 2000 SQ_{122} | — | September 24, 2000 | Socorro | LINEAR | TIR | 5.0 km | MPC · JPL |
| 182159 | 2000 SZ_{132} | — | September 23, 2000 | Socorro | LINEAR | · | 3.9 km | MPC · JPL |
| 182160 | 2000 SC_{161} | — | September 27, 2000 | Socorro | LINEAR | · | 3.4 km | MPC · JPL |
| 182161 | 2000 SL_{184} | — | September 20, 2000 | Haleakala | NEAT | L5 | 20 km | MPC · JPL |
| 182162 | 2000 SZ_{186} | — | September 21, 2000 | Haleakala | NEAT | GAL | 3.1 km | MPC · JPL |
| 182163 | 2000 SO_{193} | — | September 24, 2000 | Socorro | LINEAR | L5 | 17 km | MPC · JPL |
| 182164 | 2000 SO_{196} | — | September 24, 2000 | Socorro | LINEAR | · | 2.3 km | MPC · JPL |
| 182165 | 2000 SO_{197} | — | September 24, 2000 | Socorro | LINEAR | · | 3.0 km | MPC · JPL |
| 182166 | 2000 SS_{202} | — | September 24, 2000 | Socorro | LINEAR | · | 3.7 km | MPC · JPL |
| 182167 | 2000 SG_{214} | — | September 26, 2000 | Socorro | LINEAR | EOS | 2.5 km | MPC · JPL |
| 182168 | 2000 SL_{214} | — | September 26, 2000 | Socorro | LINEAR | · | 3.5 km | MPC · JPL |
| 182169 | 2000 SQ_{216} | — | September 26, 2000 | Socorro | LINEAR | GEF | 2.2 km | MPC · JPL |
| 182170 | 2000 SU_{222} | — | September 27, 2000 | Socorro | LINEAR | · | 3.2 km | MPC · JPL |
| 182171 | 2000 SZ_{222} | — | September 27, 2000 | Socorro | LINEAR | · | 3.1 km | MPC · JPL |
| 182172 | 2000 SG_{229} | — | September 28, 2000 | Socorro | LINEAR | AGN | 1.8 km | MPC · JPL |
| 182173 | 2000 SX_{239} | — | September 28, 2000 | Socorro | LINEAR | NAE | 5.5 km | MPC · JPL |
| 182174 | 2000 SQ_{247} | — | September 24, 2000 | Socorro | LINEAR | · | 2.7 km | MPC · JPL |
| 182175 | 2000 SH_{250} | — | September 24, 2000 | Socorro | LINEAR | EOS | 6.2 km | MPC · JPL |
| 182176 | 2000 SM_{250} | — | September 24, 2000 | Socorro | LINEAR | L5 | 18 km | MPC · JPL |
| 182177 | 2000 SK_{253} | — | September 24, 2000 | Socorro | LINEAR | · | 2.7 km | MPC · JPL |
| 182178 | 2000 SR_{282} | — | September 23, 2000 | Socorro | LINEAR | L5 | 15 km | MPC · JPL |
| 182179 | 2000 SC_{292} | — | September 27, 2000 | Socorro | LINEAR | · | 3.5 km | MPC · JPL |
| 182180 | 2000 SP_{294} | — | September 27, 2000 | Socorro | LINEAR | · | 4.2 km | MPC · JPL |
| 182181 | 2000 SG_{310} | — | September 26, 2000 | Socorro | LINEAR | · | 6.2 km | MPC · JPL |
| 182182 | 2000 SK_{318} | — | September 29, 2000 | Haleakala | NEAT | JUN | 3.1 km | MPC · JPL |
| 182183 | 2000 SK_{324} | — | September 28, 2000 | Kitt Peak | Spacewatch | · | 2.3 km | MPC · JPL |
| 182184 | 2000 SP_{325} | — | September 29, 2000 | Kitt Peak | Spacewatch | HYG | 3.3 km | MPC · JPL |
| 182185 | 2000 SR_{343} | — | September 23, 2000 | Socorro | LINEAR | · | 3.4 km | MPC · JPL |
| 182186 | 2000 SU_{349} | — | September 29, 2000 | Anderson Mesa | LONEOS | · | 4.5 km | MPC · JPL |
| 182187 | 2000 SY_{363} | — | September 20, 2000 | Socorro | LINEAR | · | 1.5 km | MPC · JPL |
| 182188 | 2000 TK_{13} | — | October 1, 2000 | Socorro | LINEAR | · | 3.8 km | MPC · JPL |
| 182189 | 2000 TM_{34} | — | October 6, 2000 | Anderson Mesa | LONEOS | · | 2.9 km | MPC · JPL |
| 182190 | 2000 TD_{35} | — | October 6, 2000 | Anderson Mesa | LONEOS | · | 910 m | MPC · JPL |
| 182191 | 2000 UC_{14} | — | October 27, 2000 | Kitt Peak | Spacewatch | · | 5.5 km | MPC · JPL |
| 182192 | 2000 UE_{14} | — | October 27, 2000 | Kitt Peak | Spacewatch | · | 3.7 km | MPC · JPL |
| 182193 | 2000 UB_{21} | — | October 24, 2000 | Socorro | LINEAR | EOS | 4.2 km | MPC · JPL |
| 182194 | 2000 UX_{24} | — | October 24, 2000 | Socorro | LINEAR | · | 3.7 km | MPC · JPL |
| 182195 | 2000 UR_{35} | — | October 24, 2000 | Socorro | LINEAR | EOS | 3.1 km | MPC · JPL |
| 182196 | 2000 UT_{45} | — | October 24, 2000 | Socorro | LINEAR | · | 5.5 km | MPC · JPL |
| 182197 | 2000 UX_{65} | — | October 25, 2000 | Socorro | LINEAR | EOS | 3.2 km | MPC · JPL |
| 182198 | 2000 UK_{105} | — | October 29, 2000 | Socorro | LINEAR | · | 2.6 km | MPC · JPL |
| 182199 | 2000 UN_{108} | — | October 31, 2000 | Socorro | LINEAR | · | 2.9 km | MPC · JPL |
| 182200 | 2000 UH_{111} | — | October 26, 2000 | Kitt Peak | Spacewatch | · | 3.7 km | MPC · JPL |

== 182201–182300 ==
back to top

| Designation | | | Discovery | | | Properties | | Ref |
| Permanent | Provisional | Named after | Date | Site | Discoverer(s) | Category | Diam. | Ref |
|---|---|---|---|---|---|---|---|---|
| 182201 | 2000 VD_{20} | — | November 1, 2000 | Socorro | LINEAR | HYG | 4.5 km | MPC · JPL |
| 182202 | 2000 VW_{20} | — | November 1, 2000 | Socorro | LINEAR | · | 3.2 km | MPC · JPL |
| 182203 | 2000 VS_{59} | — | November 1, 2000 | Kitt Peak | Spacewatch | THM | 3.4 km | MPC · JPL |
| 182204 | 2000 WA_{21} | — | November 25, 2000 | Kitt Peak | Spacewatch | 3:2 · SHU | 8.8 km | MPC · JPL |
| 182205 | 2000 WR_{21} | — | November 24, 2000 | Bohyunsan | Jeon, Y.-B., Lee, B.-C. | AGN | 1.9 km | MPC · JPL |
| 182206 | 2000 WZ_{42} | — | November 21, 2000 | Socorro | LINEAR | · | 5.1 km | MPC · JPL |
| 182207 | 2000 WF_{46} | — | November 21, 2000 | Socorro | LINEAR | · | 1.5 km | MPC · JPL |
| 182208 | 2000 WC_{57} | — | November 21, 2000 | Socorro | LINEAR | · | 6.1 km | MPC · JPL |
| 182209 | 2000 WM_{69} | — | November 19, 2000 | Socorro | LINEAR | EOS | 3.7 km | MPC · JPL |
| 182210 | 2000 WR_{82} | — | November 20, 2000 | Socorro | LINEAR | · | 4.6 km | MPC · JPL |
| 182211 | 2000 WT_{102} | — | November 26, 2000 | Socorro | LINEAR | · | 5.9 km | MPC · JPL |
| 182212 | 2000 WN_{122} | — | November 29, 2000 | Socorro | LINEAR | · | 5.1 km | MPC · JPL |
| 182213 | 2000 WU_{122} | — | November 29, 2000 | Socorro | LINEAR | NYS | 1.7 km | MPC · JPL |
| 182214 | 2000 WB_{127} | — | November 17, 2000 | Kitt Peak | Spacewatch | · | 3.6 km | MPC · JPL |
| 182215 | 2000 WP_{145} | — | November 22, 2000 | Haleakala | NEAT | · | 5.6 km | MPC · JPL |
| 182216 | 2000 WK_{163} | — | November 21, 2000 | Socorro | LINEAR | EOS | 3.6 km | MPC · JPL |
| 182217 | 2000 WR_{163} | — | November 21, 2000 | Socorro | LINEAR | · | 2.9 km | MPC · JPL |
| 182218 | 2000 WX_{180} | — | November 29, 2000 | Socorro | LINEAR | · | 4.4 km | MPC · JPL |
| 182219 | 2000 XG_{26} | — | December 4, 2000 | Socorro | LINEAR | · | 1.1 km | MPC · JPL |
| 182220 | 2000 XP_{29} | — | December 4, 2000 | Socorro | LINEAR | · | 3.0 km | MPC · JPL |
| 182221 | 2000 XO_{48} | — | December 4, 2000 | Socorro | LINEAR | · | 7.3 km | MPC · JPL |
| 182222 | 2000 YU_{1} | — | December 16, 2000 | Kitt Peak | M. J. Holman, B. Gladman, T. Grav | cubewano (hot) | 167 km | MPC · JPL |
| 182223 | 2000 YC_{2} | — | December 17, 2000 | Kitt Peak | M. J. Holman, B. Gladman, T. Grav | SDO | 116 km | MPC · JPL |
| 182224 | 2000 YO_{10} | — | December 22, 2000 | Socorro | LINEAR | HYG | 4.2 km | MPC · JPL |
| 182225 | 2000 YP_{35} | — | December 30, 2000 | Socorro | LINEAR | · | 8.6 km | MPC · JPL |
| 182226 | 2000 YS_{65} | — | December 29, 2000 | Haleakala | NEAT | · | 4.9 km | MPC · JPL |
| 182227 | 2000 YU_{84} | — | December 30, 2000 | Socorro | LINEAR | · | 1.7 km | MPC · JPL |
| 182228 | 2000 YF_{89} | — | December 30, 2000 | Socorro | LINEAR | THM | 3.7 km | MPC · JPL |
| 182229 | 2000 YC_{124} | — | December 29, 2000 | Anderson Mesa | LONEOS | · | 6.7 km | MPC · JPL |
| 182230 | 2001 CL_{7} | — | February 1, 2001 | Socorro | LINEAR | · | 1.3 km | MPC · JPL |
| 182231 | 2001 CZ_{20} | — | February 2, 2001 | Anderson Mesa | LONEOS | · | 1.3 km | MPC · JPL |
| 182232 | 2001 DJ_{4} | — | February 16, 2001 | Socorro | LINEAR | · | 1.6 km | MPC · JPL |
| 182233 | 2001 DT_{4} | — | February 16, 2001 | Socorro | LINEAR | · | 1.2 km | MPC · JPL |
| 182234 | 2001 DH_{9} | — | February 16, 2001 | Oaxaca | Roe, J. M. | · | 1.2 km | MPC · JPL |
| 182235 | 2001 DY_{14} | — | February 17, 2001 | Črni Vrh | Matičič, S. | · | 1.2 km | MPC · JPL |
| 182236 | 2001 DV_{17} | — | February 16, 2001 | Socorro | LINEAR | · | 1.1 km | MPC · JPL |
| 182237 | 2001 DT_{33} | — | February 17, 2001 | Socorro | LINEAR | · | 1.3 km | MPC · JPL |
| 182238 | 2001 DW_{45} | — | February 19, 2001 | Socorro | LINEAR | · | 1.4 km | MPC · JPL |
| 182239 | 2001 DS_{78} | — | February 22, 2001 | Kitt Peak | Spacewatch | 3:2 | 7.2 km | MPC · JPL |
| 182240 | 2001 DL_{93} | — | February 19, 2001 | Socorro | LINEAR | · | 800 m | MPC · JPL |
| 182241 | 2001 EF_{14} | — | March 15, 2001 | Socorro | LINEAR | · | 1.3 km | MPC · JPL |
| 182242 | 2001 ED_{21} | — | March 15, 2001 | Anderson Mesa | LONEOS | · | 1.3 km | MPC · JPL |
| 182243 | 2001 FV_{9} | — | March 20, 2001 | Eskridge | G. Hug | · | 2.1 km | MPC · JPL |
| 182244 | 2001 FF_{17} | — | March 19, 2001 | Anderson Mesa | LONEOS | · | 1.9 km | MPC · JPL |
| 182245 | 2001 FU_{19} | — | March 19, 2001 | Anderson Mesa | LONEOS | ERI | 2.3 km | MPC · JPL |
| 182246 | 2001 FE_{45} | — | March 18, 2001 | Socorro | LINEAR | · | 1.9 km | MPC · JPL |
| 182247 | 2001 FP_{52} | — | March 18, 2001 | Socorro | LINEAR | NYS | 1.6 km | MPC · JPL |
| 182248 | 2001 FJ_{71} | — | March 19, 2001 | Socorro | LINEAR | · | 1.2 km | MPC · JPL |
| 182249 | 2001 FG_{72} | — | March 19, 2001 | Socorro | LINEAR | · | 1.2 km | MPC · JPL |
| 182250 | 2001 FZ_{81} | — | March 23, 2001 | Socorro | LINEAR | · | 1.1 km | MPC · JPL |
| 182251 | 2001 FZ_{93} | — | March 16, 2001 | Socorro | LINEAR | · | 1.4 km | MPC · JPL |
| 182252 | 2001 FW_{98} | — | March 16, 2001 | Socorro | LINEAR | · | 1.4 km | MPC · JPL |
| 182253 | 2001 FV_{102} | — | March 18, 2001 | Socorro | LINEAR | · | 1.3 km | MPC · JPL |
| 182254 | 2001 FV_{103} | — | March 18, 2001 | Socorro | LINEAR | · | 1.1 km | MPC · JPL |
| 182255 | 2001 FM_{108} | — | March 18, 2001 | Socorro | LINEAR | · | 1.2 km | MPC · JPL |
| 182256 | 2001 FR_{145} | — | March 24, 2001 | Kitt Peak | Spacewatch | · | 1.1 km | MPC · JPL |
| 182257 | 2001 FJ_{147} | — | March 24, 2001 | Anderson Mesa | LONEOS | · | 1.4 km | MPC · JPL |
| 182258 | 2001 FR_{168} | — | March 23, 2001 | Anderson Mesa | LONEOS | (2076) | 1.3 km | MPC · JPL |
| 182259 | 2001 FZ_{185} | — | March 16, 2001 | Socorro | LINEAR | · | 1.1 km | MPC · JPL |
| 182260 | 2001 GA_{3} | — | April 14, 2001 | Socorro | LINEAR | · | 1.5 km | MPC · JPL |
| 182261 | 2001 GN_{9} | — | April 15, 2001 | Socorro | LINEAR | · | 1.9 km | MPC · JPL |
| 182262 Solène | 2001 HA | Solène | April 17, 2001 | Saint-Véran | St. Veran | NYS | 1.6 km | MPC · JPL |
| 182263 | 2001 HQ_{8} | — | April 21, 2001 | Socorro | LINEAR | · | 1.5 km | MPC · JPL |
| 182264 | 2001 HW_{10} | — | April 17, 2001 | Socorro | LINEAR | · | 2.9 km | MPC · JPL |
| 182265 | 2001 HX_{19} | — | April 26, 2001 | Kitt Peak | Spacewatch | · | 1.2 km | MPC · JPL |
| 182266 | 2001 HO_{25} | — | April 26, 2001 | Kitt Peak | Spacewatch | ERI | 2.7 km | MPC · JPL |
| 182267 | 2001 HK_{26} | — | April 27, 2001 | Kitt Peak | Spacewatch | · | 1.5 km | MPC · JPL |
| 182268 | 2001 HT_{26} | — | April 27, 2001 | Kitt Peak | Spacewatch | · | 3.5 km | MPC · JPL |
| 182269 | 2001 HF_{33} | — | April 27, 2001 | Socorro | LINEAR | · | 1.4 km | MPC · JPL |
| 182270 | 2001 HK_{42} | — | April 16, 2001 | Socorro | LINEAR | · | 1.1 km | MPC · JPL |
| 182271 | 2001 HQ_{54} | — | April 24, 2001 | Kitt Peak | Spacewatch | MAS | 1.1 km | MPC · JPL |
| 182272 | 2001 HS_{59} | — | April 23, 2001 | Socorro | LINEAR | · | 1.3 km | MPC · JPL |
| 182273 | 2001 KA | — | May 16, 2001 | Nogales | Tenagra II | · | 2.0 km | MPC · JPL |
| 182274 | 2001 KY_{1} | — | May 18, 2001 | Socorro | LINEAR | · | 4.8 km | MPC · JPL |
| 182275 | 2001 KA_{9} | — | May 18, 2001 | Socorro | LINEAR | (5) | 1.8 km | MPC · JPL |
| 182276 | 2001 KA_{10} | — | May 18, 2001 | Socorro | LINEAR | · | 1.9 km | MPC · JPL |
| 182277 | 2001 KD_{13} | — | May 18, 2001 | Socorro | LINEAR | · | 1.4 km | MPC · JPL |
| 182278 | 2001 KG_{18} | — | May 20, 2001 | Ondřejov | P. Kušnirák, P. Pravec | · | 2.4 km | MPC · JPL |
| 182279 | 2001 KC_{22} | — | May 17, 2001 | Socorro | LINEAR | · | 1.8 km | MPC · JPL |
| 182280 | 2001 KA_{23} | — | May 17, 2001 | Socorro | LINEAR | ERI | 3.3 km | MPC · JPL |
| 182281 | 2001 KX_{23} | — | May 17, 2001 | Socorro | LINEAR | · | 1.9 km | MPC · JPL |
| 182282 | 2001 KU_{25} | — | May 17, 2001 | Socorro | LINEAR | · | 1.4 km | MPC · JPL |
| 182283 | 2001 KT_{27} | — | May 17, 2001 | Socorro | LINEAR | NYS | 1.6 km | MPC · JPL |
| 182284 | 2001 KA_{35} | — | May 18, 2001 | Socorro | LINEAR | ERI | 3.0 km | MPC · JPL |
| 182285 | 2001 KB_{35} | — | May 18, 2001 | Socorro | LINEAR | · | 1.9 km | MPC · JPL |
| 182286 | 2001 KD_{49} | — | May 24, 2001 | Socorro | LINEAR | NYS | 2.1 km | MPC · JPL |
| 182287 | 2001 KE_{52} | — | May 17, 2001 | Socorro | LINEAR | · | 2.7 km | MPC · JPL |
| 182288 | 2001 KN_{58} | — | May 26, 2001 | Socorro | LINEAR | · | 1.6 km | MPC · JPL |
| 182289 | 2001 KN_{59} | — | May 26, 2001 | Socorro | LINEAR | · | 3.3 km | MPC · JPL |
| 182290 | 2001 KN_{68} | — | May 20, 2001 | Haleakala | NEAT | · | 1.8 km | MPC · JPL |
| 182291 | 2001 KV_{72} | — | May 24, 2001 | Socorro | LINEAR | MAS | 1.3 km | MPC · JPL |
| 182292 | 2001 KZ_{73} | — | May 25, 2001 | Kitt Peak | Spacewatch | · | 1.1 km | MPC · JPL |
| 182293 | 2001 KJ_{75} | — | May 31, 2001 | Palomar | NEAT | PHO | 1.3 km | MPC · JPL |
| 182294 | 2001 KU_{76} | — | May 24, 2001 | Cerro Tololo | M. W. Buie | res · 6:11 | 182 km | MPC · JPL |
| 182295 | 2001 LJ_{13} | — | June 15, 2001 | Socorro | LINEAR | · | 2.0 km | MPC · JPL |
| 182296 | 2001 MN_{12} | — | June 21, 2001 | Palomar | NEAT | · | 2.1 km | MPC · JPL |
| 182297 | 2001 MH_{14} | — | June 28, 2001 | Anderson Mesa | LONEOS | RAF | 1.8 km | MPC · JPL |
| 182298 | 2001 MM_{20} | — | June 25, 2001 | Palomar | NEAT | · | 2.3 km | MPC · JPL |
| 182299 | 2001 NE_{1} | — | July 12, 2001 | Palomar | NEAT | MAS | 1.2 km | MPC · JPL |
| 182300 | 2001 NG_{2} | — | July 13, 2001 | Palomar | NEAT | · | 1.6 km | MPC · JPL |

== 182301–182400 ==
back to top

| Designation | | | Discovery | | | Properties | | Ref |
| Permanent | Provisional | Named after | Date | Site | Discoverer(s) | Category | Diam. | Ref |
|---|---|---|---|---|---|---|---|---|
| 182301 | 2001 NN_{19} | — | July 14, 2001 | Haleakala | NEAT | · | 7.2 km | MPC · JPL |
| 182302 | 2001 NC_{22} | — | July 14, 2001 | Palomar | NEAT | · | 2.1 km | MPC · JPL |
| 182303 | 2001 NR_{22} | — | July 14, 2001 | Palomar | NEAT | MAS | 1.0 km | MPC · JPL |
| 182304 | 2001 OV_{7} | — | July 17, 2001 | Anderson Mesa | LONEOS | · | 4.9 km | MPC · JPL |
| 182305 | 2001 OY_{7} | — | July 17, 2001 | Anderson Mesa | LONEOS | · | 2.6 km | MPC · JPL |
| 182306 | 2001 OK_{25} | — | July 18, 2001 | Haleakala | NEAT | · | 2.0 km | MPC · JPL |
| 182307 | 2001 OF_{36} | — | July 21, 2001 | Palomar | NEAT | H | 710 m | MPC · JPL |
| 182308 | 2001 OU_{41} | — | July 21, 2001 | Haleakala | NEAT | · | 1.9 km | MPC · JPL |
| 182309 | 2001 OV_{41} | — | July 22, 2001 | Palomar | NEAT | · | 2.1 km | MPC · JPL |
| 182310 | 2001 OO_{43} | — | July 22, 2001 | Palomar | NEAT | H | 940 m | MPC · JPL |
| 182311 | 2001 OY_{55} | — | July 22, 2001 | Palomar | NEAT | EUN | 1.8 km | MPC · JPL |
| 182312 | 2001 OT_{59} | — | July 21, 2001 | Haleakala | NEAT | · | 1.9 km | MPC · JPL |
| 182313 | 2001 OK_{61} | — | July 21, 2001 | Haleakala | NEAT | (5) | 2.2 km | MPC · JPL |
| 182314 | 2001 ON_{62} | — | July 25, 2001 | Palomar | NEAT | H | 720 m | MPC · JPL |
| 182315 | 2001 OF_{66} | — | July 22, 2001 | Palomar | NEAT | · | 5.1 km | MPC · JPL |
| 182316 | 2001 OT_{86} | — | July 28, 2001 | Haleakala | NEAT | · | 1.5 km | MPC · JPL |
| 182317 | 2001 OM_{88} | — | July 21, 2001 | Haleakala | NEAT | · | 1.6 km | MPC · JPL |
| 182318 | 2001 OE_{91} | — | July 25, 2001 | Haleakala | NEAT | · | 2.9 km | MPC · JPL |
| 182319 | 2001 OA_{98} | — | July 25, 2001 | Haleakala | NEAT | · | 2.0 km | MPC · JPL |
| 182320 | 2001 OJ_{99} | — | July 27, 2001 | Anderson Mesa | LONEOS | · | 1.7 km | MPC · JPL |
| 182321 | 2001 OA_{104} | — | July 30, 2001 | Socorro | LINEAR | · | 1.7 km | MPC · JPL |
| 182322 | 2001 OR_{111} | — | July 27, 2001 | Anderson Mesa | LONEOS | · | 2.8 km | MPC · JPL |
| 182323 | 2001 OC_{113} | — | July 28, 2001 | Anderson Mesa | LONEOS | · | 5.2 km | MPC · JPL |
| 182324 | 2001 PP_{4} | — | August 10, 2001 | Palomar | NEAT | PHO | 2.3 km | MPC · JPL |
| 182325 | 2001 PC_{5} | — | August 9, 2001 | Palomar | NEAT | (5) | 2.0 km | MPC · JPL |
| 182326 | 2001 PH_{5} | — | August 10, 2001 | Palomar | NEAT | · | 1.9 km | MPC · JPL |
| 182327 | 2001 PJ_{11} | — | August 9, 2001 | Palomar | NEAT | ERI | 2.6 km | MPC · JPL |
| 182328 | 2001 PS_{13} | — | August 9, 2001 | Palomar | NEAT | · | 1.6 km | MPC · JPL |
| 182329 | 2001 PH_{15} | — | August 8, 2001 | Haleakala | NEAT | (5) | 2.2 km | MPC · JPL |
| 182330 | 2001 PD_{18} | — | August 9, 2001 | Palomar | NEAT | · | 3.1 km | MPC · JPL |
| 182331 | 2001 PN_{19} | — | August 10, 2001 | Palomar | NEAT | · | 2.6 km | MPC · JPL |
| 182332 | 2001 PO_{24} | — | August 11, 2001 | Haleakala | NEAT | · | 2.0 km | MPC · JPL |
| 182333 | 2001 PP_{37} | — | August 11, 2001 | Palomar | NEAT | · | 2.2 km | MPC · JPL |
| 182334 | 2001 PB_{43} | — | August 12, 2001 | Haleakala | NEAT | · | 1.7 km | MPC · JPL |
| 182335 | 2001 PV_{44} | — | August 15, 2001 | Haleakala | NEAT | · | 2.0 km | MPC · JPL |
| 182336 | 2001 PL_{52} | — | August 15, 2001 | Haleakala | NEAT | · | 2.3 km | MPC · JPL |
| 182337 | 2001 PV_{54} | — | August 14, 2001 | Palomar | NEAT | · | 5.0 km | MPC · JPL |
| 182338 | 2001 PG_{65} | — | August 11, 2001 | Haleakala | NEAT | · | 2.0 km | MPC · JPL |
| 182339 | 2001 PZ_{66} | — | August 12, 2001 | Palomar | NEAT | HNS | 1.6 km | MPC · JPL |
| 182340 | 2001 QM_{1} | — | August 16, 2001 | Socorro | LINEAR | · | 2.6 km | MPC · JPL |
| 182341 | 2001 QP_{3} | — | August 16, 2001 | Socorro | LINEAR | · | 2.4 km | MPC · JPL |
| 182342 | 2001 QA_{7} | — | August 16, 2001 | Socorro | LINEAR | · | 2.2 km | MPC · JPL |
| 182343 | 2001 QY_{8} | — | August 16, 2001 | Socorro | LINEAR | · | 3.2 km | MPC · JPL |
| 182344 | 2001 QJ_{10} | — | August 16, 2001 | Socorro | LINEAR | · | 1.6 km | MPC · JPL |
| 182345 | 2001 QH_{12} | — | August 16, 2001 | Socorro | LINEAR | ADE | 5.5 km | MPC · JPL |
| 182346 | 2001 QC_{15} | — | August 16, 2001 | Socorro | LINEAR | · | 1.8 km | MPC · JPL |
| 182347 | 2001 QU_{33} | — | August 17, 2001 | Needville | J. Dellinger, P. G. A. Garossino | · | 2.6 km | MPC · JPL |
| 182348 | 2001 QB_{35} | — | August 16, 2001 | Socorro | LINEAR | · | 1.5 km | MPC · JPL |
| 182349 | 2001 QN_{39} | — | August 16, 2001 | Socorro | LINEAR | · | 1.6 km | MPC · JPL |
| 182350 | 2001 QY_{43} | — | August 16, 2001 | Socorro | LINEAR | · | 2.5 km | MPC · JPL |
| 182351 | 2001 QF_{44} | — | August 16, 2001 | Socorro | LINEAR | NYS | 1.2 km | MPC · JPL |
| 182352 | 2001 QH_{45} | — | August 16, 2001 | Socorro | LINEAR | · | 1.5 km | MPC · JPL |
| 182353 | 2001 QG_{47} | — | August 16, 2001 | Socorro | LINEAR | MAS | 1.0 km | MPC · JPL |
| 182354 | 2001 QJ_{60} | — | August 18, 2001 | Socorro | LINEAR | · | 2.4 km | MPC · JPL |
| 182355 | 2001 QL_{61} | — | August 16, 2001 | Socorro | LINEAR | · | 1.8 km | MPC · JPL |
| 182356 | 2001 QV_{73} | — | August 16, 2001 | Socorro | LINEAR | · | 2.4 km | MPC · JPL |
| 182357 | 2001 QQ_{91} | — | August 17, 2001 | Socorro | LINEAR | · | 2.1 km | MPC · JPL |
| 182358 | 2001 QJ_{98} | — | August 19, 2001 | Socorro | LINEAR | · | 4.3 km | MPC · JPL |
| 182359 | 2001 QD_{114} | — | August 17, 2001 | Socorro | LINEAR | · | 2.7 km | MPC · JPL |
| 182360 | 2001 QU_{115} | — | August 17, 2001 | Socorro | LINEAR | DOR | 4.4 km | MPC · JPL |
| 182361 | 2001 QN_{120} | — | August 19, 2001 | Socorro | LINEAR | · | 2.0 km | MPC · JPL |
| 182362 | 2001 QZ_{122} | — | August 19, 2001 | Socorro | LINEAR | · | 1.9 km | MPC · JPL |
| 182363 | 2001 QW_{124} | — | August 19, 2001 | Socorro | LINEAR | NYS | 1.5 km | MPC · JPL |
| 182364 | 2001 QD_{125} | — | August 19, 2001 | Socorro | LINEAR | · | 2.3 km | MPC · JPL |
| 182365 | 2001 QK_{127} | — | August 20, 2001 | Socorro | LINEAR | · | 1.9 km | MPC · JPL |
| 182366 | 2001 QC_{136} | — | August 22, 2001 | Socorro | LINEAR | · | 5.8 km | MPC · JPL |
| 182367 | 2001 QY_{143} | — | August 21, 2001 | Kitt Peak | Spacewatch | DOR | 3.2 km | MPC · JPL |
| 182368 | 2001 QD_{145} | — | August 24, 2001 | Kitt Peak | Spacewatch | · | 2.2 km | MPC · JPL |
| 182369 | 2001 QD_{156} | — | August 23, 2001 | Anderson Mesa | LONEOS | · | 1.9 km | MPC · JPL |
| 182370 | 2001 QK_{156} | — | August 23, 2001 | Anderson Mesa | LONEOS | RAF | 1.5 km | MPC · JPL |
| 182371 | 2001 QR_{161} | — | August 23, 2001 | Anderson Mesa | LONEOS | · | 1.7 km | MPC · JPL |
| 182372 | 2001 QJ_{180} | — | August 25, 2001 | Palomar | NEAT | NYS | 1.7 km | MPC · JPL |
| 182373 | 2001 QY_{181} | — | August 29, 2001 | Palomar | NEAT | · | 2.0 km | MPC · JPL |
| 182374 | 2001 QY_{182} | — | August 23, 2001 | Palomar | NEAT | · | 2.1 km | MPC · JPL |
| 182375 | 2001 QJ_{183} | — | August 22, 2001 | Bergisch Gladbach | W. Bickel | · | 2.0 km | MPC · JPL |
| 182376 | 2001 QU_{192} | — | August 22, 2001 | Socorro | LINEAR | · | 2.6 km | MPC · JPL |
| 182377 | 2001 QW_{196} | — | August 22, 2001 | Kitt Peak | Spacewatch | NYS | 1.6 km | MPC · JPL |
| 182378 | 2001 QW_{198} | — | August 22, 2001 | Socorro | LINEAR | · | 2.6 km | MPC · JPL |
| 182379 | 2001 QX_{215} | — | August 23, 2001 | Anderson Mesa | LONEOS | · | 1.7 km | MPC · JPL |
| 182380 | 2001 QR_{230} | — | August 24, 2001 | Anderson Mesa | LONEOS | · | 1.9 km | MPC · JPL |
| 182381 | 2001 QL_{232} | — | August 24, 2001 | Kitt Peak | Spacewatch | · | 1.7 km | MPC · JPL |
| 182382 | 2001 QT_{240} | — | August 24, 2001 | Socorro | LINEAR | (5) | 1.6 km | MPC · JPL |
| 182383 | 2001 QJ_{241} | — | August 24, 2001 | Socorro | LINEAR | · | 2.2 km | MPC · JPL |
| 182384 | 2001 QR_{243} | — | August 24, 2001 | Socorro | LINEAR | · | 1.9 km | MPC · JPL |
| 182385 | 2001 QA_{244} | — | August 24, 2001 | Socorro | LINEAR | · | 1.9 km | MPC · JPL |
| 182386 | 2001 QF_{253} | — | August 25, 2001 | Socorro | LINEAR | AEO | 2.4 km | MPC · JPL |
| 182387 | 2001 QQ_{254} | — | August 25, 2001 | Anderson Mesa | LONEOS | · | 2.4 km | MPC · JPL |
| 182388 | 2001 QT_{254} | — | August 25, 2001 | Socorro | LINEAR | · | 1.9 km | MPC · JPL |
| 182389 | 2001 QY_{255} | — | August 25, 2001 | Socorro | LINEAR | NYS | 1.7 km | MPC · JPL |
| 182390 | 2001 QD_{261} | — | August 25, 2001 | Socorro | LINEAR | · | 2.7 km | MPC · JPL |
| 182391 | 2001 QD_{266} | — | August 20, 2001 | Socorro | LINEAR | PHO | 1.9 km | MPC · JPL |
| 182392 | 2001 QB_{269} | — | August 20, 2001 | Palomar | NEAT | · | 2.5 km | MPC · JPL |
| 182393 | 2001 QG_{272} | — | August 19, 2001 | Socorro | LINEAR | EUN | 2.1 km | MPC · JPL |
| 182394 | 2001 QD_{279} | — | August 19, 2001 | Socorro | LINEAR | · | 2.5 km | MPC · JPL |
| 182395 | 2001 QL_{280} | — | August 19, 2001 | Socorro | LINEAR | · | 2.5 km | MPC · JPL |
| 182396 | 2001 QF_{287} | — | August 17, 2001 | Socorro | LINEAR | · | 1.8 km | MPC · JPL |
| 182397 | 2001 QW_{297} | — | August 20, 2001 | Cerro Tololo | M. W. Buie | res · 4:9 | 206 km | MPC · JPL |
| 182398 | 2001 QK_{333} | — | August 20, 2001 | Palomar | NEAT | · | 1.9 km | MPC · JPL |
| 182399 | 2001 RX | — | September 8, 2001 | Goodricke-Pigott | R. A. Tucker | · | 1.8 km | MPC · JPL |
| 182400 | 2001 RZ_{1} | — | September 7, 2001 | Socorro | LINEAR | · | 2.3 km | MPC · JPL |

== 182401–182500 ==
back to top

| Designation | | | Discovery | | | Properties | | Ref |
| Permanent | Provisional | Named after | Date | Site | Discoverer(s) | Category | Diam. | Ref |
|---|---|---|---|---|---|---|---|---|
| 182401 | 2001 RT_{15} | — | September 8, 2001 | Socorro | LINEAR | · | 2.9 km | MPC · JPL |
| 182402 | 2001 RQ_{18} | — | September 7, 2001 | Socorro | LINEAR | · | 2.3 km | MPC · JPL |
| 182403 | 2001 RK_{24} | — | September 7, 2001 | Socorro | LINEAR | · | 1.5 km | MPC · JPL |
| 182404 | 2001 RE_{32} | — | September 8, 2001 | Socorro | LINEAR | fast | 2.3 km | MPC · JPL |
| 182405 | 2001 RW_{35} | — | September 8, 2001 | Socorro | LINEAR | · | 2.1 km | MPC · JPL |
| 182406 | 2001 RB_{38} | — | September 8, 2001 | Socorro | LINEAR | · | 2.4 km | MPC · JPL |
| 182407 | 2001 RD_{48} | — | September 10, 2001 | Desert Eagle | W. K. Y. Yeung | KON | 3.4 km | MPC · JPL |
| 182408 | 2001 RS_{53} | — | September 12, 2001 | Socorro | LINEAR | · | 1.6 km | MPC · JPL |
| 182409 | 2001 RC_{56} | — | September 12, 2001 | Socorro | LINEAR | · | 2.3 km | MPC · JPL |
| 182410 | 2001 RB_{59} | — | September 12, 2001 | Socorro | LINEAR | · | 2.6 km | MPC · JPL |
| 182411 | 2001 RU_{60} | — | September 12, 2001 | Socorro | LINEAR | DOR | 3.2 km | MPC · JPL |
| 182412 | 2001 RJ_{65} | — | September 10, 2001 | Socorro | LINEAR | EUN | 2.0 km | MPC · JPL |
| 182413 | 2001 RL_{66} | — | September 10, 2001 | Socorro | LINEAR | · | 1.9 km | MPC · JPL |
| 182414 | 2001 RZ_{73} | — | September 10, 2001 | Socorro | LINEAR | · | 3.3 km | MPC · JPL |
| 182415 | 2001 RZ_{75} | — | September 10, 2001 | Socorro | LINEAR | EUN | 2.2 km | MPC · JPL |
| 182416 | 2001 RR_{78} | — | September 10, 2001 | Socorro | LINEAR | EUN | 2.5 km | MPC · JPL |
| 182417 | 2001 RL_{81} | — | September 14, 2001 | Palomar | NEAT | · | 1.5 km | MPC · JPL |
| 182418 | 2001 RW_{88} | — | September 11, 2001 | Anderson Mesa | LONEOS | EUN | 1.9 km | MPC · JPL |
| 182419 | 2001 RV_{98} | — | September 12, 2001 | Socorro | LINEAR | · | 1.3 km | MPC · JPL |
| 182420 | 2001 RQ_{99} | — | September 12, 2001 | Socorro | LINEAR | · | 1.8 km | MPC · JPL |
| 182421 | 2001 RC_{103} | — | September 12, 2001 | Socorro | LINEAR | · | 5.1 km | MPC · JPL |
| 182422 | 2001 RF_{104} | — | September 12, 2001 | Socorro | LINEAR | (5) | 1.4 km | MPC · JPL |
| 182423 | 2001 RR_{104} | — | September 12, 2001 | Socorro | LINEAR | · | 4.4 km | MPC · JPL |
| 182424 | 2001 RN_{113} | — | September 12, 2001 | Socorro | LINEAR | · | 3.9 km | MPC · JPL |
| 182425 | 2001 RR_{114} | — | September 12, 2001 | Socorro | LINEAR | · | 3.2 km | MPC · JPL |
| 182426 | 2001 RL_{118} | — | September 12, 2001 | Socorro | LINEAR | · | 1.3 km | MPC · JPL |
| 182427 | 2001 RS_{120} | — | September 12, 2001 | Socorro | LINEAR | · | 2.1 km | MPC · JPL |
| 182428 | 2001 RS_{126} | — | September 12, 2001 | Socorro | LINEAR | · | 2.0 km | MPC · JPL |
| 182429 | 2001 RZ_{129} | — | September 12, 2001 | Socorro | LINEAR | · | 1.8 km | MPC · JPL |
| 182430 | 2001 RF_{131} | — | September 12, 2001 | Socorro | LINEAR | · | 2.0 km | MPC · JPL |
| 182431 | 2001 RD_{132} | — | September 12, 2001 | Socorro | LINEAR | · | 2.4 km | MPC · JPL |
| 182432 | 2001 RJ_{134} | — | September 12, 2001 | Socorro | LINEAR | · | 2.6 km | MPC · JPL |
| 182433 | 2001 RR_{134} | — | September 12, 2001 | Socorro | LINEAR | · | 1.5 km | MPC · JPL |
| 182434 | 2001 RH_{136} | — | September 12, 2001 | Socorro | LINEAR | · | 2.4 km | MPC · JPL |
| 182435 | 2001 RE_{140} | — | September 12, 2001 | Socorro | LINEAR | · | 2.5 km | MPC · JPL |
| 182436 | 2001 SJ_{1} | — | September 17, 2001 | Desert Eagle | W. K. Y. Yeung | (5) | 1.9 km | MPC · JPL |
| 182437 | 2001 SS_{11} | — | September 16, 2001 | Socorro | LINEAR | · | 1.9 km | MPC · JPL |
| 182438 | 2001 SO_{15} | — | September 16, 2001 | Socorro | LINEAR | (7744) | 2.0 km | MPC · JPL |
| 182439 | 2001 SS_{17} | — | September 16, 2001 | Socorro | LINEAR | · | 2.0 km | MPC · JPL |
| 182440 | 2001 SB_{19} | — | September 16, 2001 | Socorro | LINEAR | · | 4.2 km | MPC · JPL |
| 182441 | 2001 SB_{21} | — | September 16, 2001 | Socorro | LINEAR | · | 2.2 km | MPC · JPL |
| 182442 | 2001 SD_{24} | — | September 16, 2001 | Socorro | LINEAR | · | 3.3 km | MPC · JPL |
| 182443 | 2001 SB_{26} | — | September 16, 2001 | Socorro | LINEAR | NYS | 1.8 km | MPC · JPL |
| 182444 | 2001 SQ_{26} | — | September 16, 2001 | Socorro | LINEAR | · | 2.1 km | MPC · JPL |
| 182445 | 2001 SD_{30} | — | September 16, 2001 | Socorro | LINEAR | L5 | 14 km | MPC · JPL |
| 182446 | 2001 SC_{31} | — | September 16, 2001 | Socorro | LINEAR | DOR | 4.5 km | MPC · JPL |
| 182447 | 2001 SL_{31} | — | September 16, 2001 | Socorro | LINEAR | · | 3.4 km | MPC · JPL |
| 182448 | 2001 SP_{38} | — | September 16, 2001 | Socorro | LINEAR | · | 2.4 km | MPC · JPL |
| 182449 | 2001 SW_{40} | — | September 16, 2001 | Socorro | LINEAR | · | 3.1 km | MPC · JPL |
| 182450 | 2001 SJ_{46} | — | September 16, 2001 | Socorro | LINEAR | · | 2.5 km | MPC · JPL |
| 182451 | 2001 SG_{50} | — | September 16, 2001 | Socorro | LINEAR | · | 2.1 km | MPC · JPL |
| 182452 | 2001 SJ_{50} | — | September 16, 2001 | Socorro | LINEAR | · | 4.8 km | MPC · JPL |
| 182453 | 2001 SB_{53} | — | September 16, 2001 | Socorro | LINEAR | ADE | 2.8 km | MPC · JPL |
| 182454 | 2001 SV_{62} | — | September 17, 2001 | Socorro | LINEAR | · | 3.2 km | MPC · JPL |
| 182455 | 2001 SO_{63} | — | September 17, 2001 | Socorro | LINEAR | H | 740 m | MPC · JPL |
| 182456 | 2001 SG_{64} | — | September 17, 2001 | Socorro | LINEAR | MRX | 1.5 km | MPC · JPL |
| 182457 | 2001 SO_{64} | — | September 17, 2001 | Socorro | LINEAR | · | 1.9 km | MPC · JPL |
| 182458 | 2001 SF_{69} | — | September 17, 2001 | Socorro | LINEAR | · | 2.5 km | MPC · JPL |
| 182459 | 2001 SZ_{72} | — | September 17, 2001 | Socorro | LINEAR | ADE · slow | 4.9 km | MPC · JPL |
| 182460 | 2001 SC_{81} | — | September 20, 2001 | Socorro | LINEAR | · | 1.9 km | MPC · JPL |
| 182461 | 2001 SK_{81} | — | September 20, 2001 | Socorro | LINEAR | · | 2.3 km | MPC · JPL |
| 182462 | 2001 SY_{82} | — | September 20, 2001 | Socorro | LINEAR | NYS | 1.5 km | MPC · JPL |
| 182463 | 2001 SK_{85} | — | September 20, 2001 | Socorro | LINEAR | WIT | 1.2 km | MPC · JPL |
| 182464 | 2001 SH_{88} | — | September 20, 2001 | Socorro | LINEAR | · | 2.9 km | MPC · JPL |
| 182465 | 2001 SF_{91} | — | September 20, 2001 | Socorro | LINEAR | · | 2.8 km | MPC · JPL |
| 182466 | 2001 SF_{92} | — | September 20, 2001 | Socorro | LINEAR | · | 2.0 km | MPC · JPL |
| 182467 | 2001 SO_{92} | — | September 20, 2001 | Socorro | LINEAR | · | 1.8 km | MPC · JPL |
| 182468 | 2001 SP_{93} | — | September 20, 2001 | Socorro | LINEAR | · | 1.9 km | MPC · JPL |
| 182469 | 2001 SD_{96} | — | September 20, 2001 | Socorro | LINEAR | · | 1.3 km | MPC · JPL |
| 182470 | 2001 SR_{97} | — | September 20, 2001 | Socorro | LINEAR | · | 2.1 km | MPC · JPL |
| 182471 | 2001 SS_{101} | — | September 20, 2001 | Socorro | LINEAR | · | 2.7 km | MPC · JPL |
| 182472 | 2001 SF_{102} | — | September 20, 2001 | Socorro | LINEAR | · | 3.1 km | MPC · JPL |
| 182473 | 2001 SE_{105} | — | September 20, 2001 | Socorro | LINEAR | · | 1.9 km | MPC · JPL |
| 182474 | 2001 SA_{110} | — | September 20, 2001 | Socorro | LINEAR | (1547) | 2.6 km | MPC · JPL |
| 182475 | 2001 SL_{115} | — | September 20, 2001 | Desert Eagle | W. K. Y. Yeung | H | 860 m | MPC · JPL |
| 182476 | 2001 SD_{116} | — | September 22, 2001 | Goodricke-Pigott | R. A. Tucker | DOR | 4.5 km | MPC · JPL |
| 182477 | 2001 SB_{118} | — | September 16, 2001 | Socorro | LINEAR | · | 2.2 km | MPC · JPL |
| 182478 | 2001 SM_{121} | — | September 16, 2001 | Socorro | LINEAR | · | 2.0 km | MPC · JPL |
| 182479 | 2001 SJ_{130} | — | September 16, 2001 | Socorro | LINEAR | · | 2.9 km | MPC · JPL |
| 182480 | 2001 SQ_{130} | — | September 16, 2001 | Socorro | LINEAR | · | 1.2 km | MPC · JPL |
| 182481 | 2001 SG_{136} | — | September 16, 2001 | Socorro | LINEAR | fast | 3.1 km | MPC · JPL |
| 182482 | 2001 SJ_{137} | — | September 16, 2001 | Socorro | LINEAR | · | 1.8 km | MPC · JPL |
| 182483 | 2001 SB_{141} | — | September 16, 2001 | Socorro | LINEAR | · | 2.0 km | MPC · JPL |
| 182484 | 2001 SA_{142} | — | September 16, 2001 | Socorro | LINEAR | · | 1.6 km | MPC · JPL |
| 182485 | 2001 SW_{142} | — | September 16, 2001 | Socorro | LINEAR | · | 4.4 km | MPC · JPL |
| 182486 | 2001 SY_{143} | — | September 16, 2001 | Socorro | LINEAR | NEM | 2.7 km | MPC · JPL |
| 182487 | 2001 SK_{158} | — | September 17, 2001 | Socorro | LINEAR | L5 | 20 km | MPC · JPL |
| 182488 | 2001 SO_{158} | — | September 17, 2001 | Socorro | LINEAR | · | 2.8 km | MPC · JPL |
| 182489 | 2001 SU_{158} | — | September 17, 2001 | Socorro | LINEAR | GEF | 2.7 km | MPC · JPL |
| 182490 | 2001 SU_{164} | — | September 17, 2001 | Socorro | LINEAR | · | 4.2 km | MPC · JPL |
| 182491 | 2001 SN_{165} | — | September 19, 2001 | Socorro | LINEAR | · | 2.3 km | MPC · JPL |
| 182492 | 2001 SO_{173} | — | September 16, 2001 | Socorro | LINEAR | · | 2.2 km | MPC · JPL |
| 182493 | 2001 SK_{174} | — | September 16, 2001 | Socorro | LINEAR | · | 2.2 km | MPC · JPL |
| 182494 | 2001 SQ_{181} | — | September 19, 2001 | Socorro | LINEAR | EUN | 1.9 km | MPC · JPL |
| 182495 | 2001 SA_{190} | — | September 19, 2001 | Socorro | LINEAR | · | 1.3 km | MPC · JPL |
| 182496 | 2001 SL_{196} | — | September 19, 2001 | Socorro | LINEAR | · | 1.8 km | MPC · JPL |
| 182497 | 2001 SL_{200} | — | September 19, 2001 | Socorro | LINEAR | HYG | 3.6 km | MPC · JPL |
| 182498 | 2001 SV_{203} | — | September 19, 2001 | Socorro | LINEAR | · | 2.0 km | MPC · JPL |
| 182499 | 2001 SF_{207} | — | September 19, 2001 | Socorro | LINEAR | PHO | 3.1 km | MPC · JPL |
| 182500 | 2001 ST_{212} | — | September 19, 2001 | Socorro | LINEAR | · | 3.1 km | MPC · JPL |

== 182501–182600 ==
back to top

| Designation | | | Discovery | | | Properties | | Ref |
| Permanent | Provisional | Named after | Date | Site | Discoverer(s) | Category | Diam. | Ref |
|---|---|---|---|---|---|---|---|---|
| 182501 | 2001 SH_{219} | — | September 19, 2001 | Socorro | LINEAR | · | 2.0 km | MPC · JPL |
| 182502 | 2001 SQ_{224} | — | September 19, 2001 | Socorro | LINEAR | (5) | 1.6 km | MPC · JPL |
| 182503 | 2001 SQ_{242} | — | September 19, 2001 | Socorro | LINEAR | · | 2.6 km | MPC · JPL |
| 182504 | 2001 SP_{245} | — | September 19, 2001 | Socorro | LINEAR | · | 2.7 km | MPC · JPL |
| 182505 | 2001 SW_{245} | — | September 19, 2001 | Socorro | LINEAR | · | 2.0 km | MPC · JPL |
| 182506 | 2001 SL_{251} | — | September 19, 2001 | Socorro | LINEAR | L5 | 18 km | MPC · JPL |
| 182507 | 2001 SN_{251} | — | September 19, 2001 | Socorro | LINEAR | · | 3.2 km | MPC · JPL |
| 182508 | 2001 SA_{253} | — | September 19, 2001 | Socorro | LINEAR | · | 1.5 km | MPC · JPL |
| 182509 | 2001 SV_{255} | — | September 19, 2001 | Socorro | LINEAR | · | 2.3 km | MPC · JPL |
| 182510 | 2001 SZ_{255} | — | September 19, 2001 | Socorro | LINEAR | · | 2.4 km | MPC · JPL |
| 182511 | 2001 SC_{258} | — | September 20, 2001 | Socorro | LINEAR | HNS | 1.8 km | MPC · JPL |
| 182512 | 2001 SL_{268} | — | September 25, 2001 | Desert Eagle | W. K. Y. Yeung | · | 2.7 km | MPC · JPL |
| 182513 | 2001 SM_{269} | — | September 19, 2001 | Kitt Peak | Spacewatch | · | 1.7 km | MPC · JPL |
| 182514 | 2001 SH_{274} | — | September 20, 2001 | Kitt Peak | Spacewatch | · | 2.6 km | MPC · JPL |
| 182515 | 2001 SS_{276} | — | September 21, 2001 | Palomar | NEAT | H | 980 m | MPC · JPL |
| 182516 | 2001 SK_{293} | — | September 19, 2001 | Socorro | LINEAR | L5 | 9.8 km | MPC · JPL |
| 182517 | 2001 SC_{294} | — | September 19, 2001 | Socorro | LINEAR | fast | 2.2 km | MPC · JPL |
| 182518 | 2001 SL_{314} | — | September 23, 2001 | Socorro | LINEAR | · | 1.6 km | MPC · JPL |
| 182519 | 2001 ST_{317} | — | September 19, 2001 | Socorro | LINEAR | · | 3.2 km | MPC · JPL |
| 182520 | 2001 SU_{320} | — | September 21, 2001 | Socorro | LINEAR | · | 2.1 km | MPC · JPL |
| 182521 | 2001 SU_{327} | — | September 18, 2001 | Anderson Mesa | LONEOS | · | 1.6 km | MPC · JPL |
| 182522 | 2001 SZ_{337} | — | September 20, 2001 | Socorro | LINEAR | L5 | 10 km | MPC · JPL |
| 182523 | 2001 SK_{339} | — | September 21, 2001 | Socorro | LINEAR | · | 3.0 km | MPC · JPL |
| 182524 | 2001 SN_{342} | — | September 21, 2001 | Socorro | LINEAR | · | 1.4 km | MPC · JPL |
| 182525 | 2001 SX_{349} | — | September 19, 2001 | Socorro | LINEAR | (5) | 2.1 km | MPC · JPL |
| 182526 | 2001 SH_{353} | — | September 19, 2001 | Socorro | LINEAR | · | 2.2 km | MPC · JPL |
| 182527 | 2001 TW_{6} | — | October 10, 2001 | Palomar | NEAT | · | 3.1 km | MPC · JPL |
| 182528 | 2001 TY_{9} | — | October 13, 2001 | Socorro | LINEAR | · | 2.2 km | MPC · JPL |
| 182529 | 2001 TE_{10} | — | October 13, 2001 | Socorro | LINEAR | · | 3.8 km | MPC · JPL |
| 182530 | 2001 TT_{10} | — | October 13, 2001 | Socorro | LINEAR | · | 2.9 km | MPC · JPL |
| 182531 | 2001 TO_{22} | — | October 13, 2001 | Socorro | LINEAR | · | 2.4 km | MPC · JPL |
| 182532 | 2001 TU_{23} | — | October 14, 2001 | Socorro | LINEAR | · | 2.1 km | MPC · JPL |
| 182533 | 2001 TA_{24} | — | October 14, 2001 | Socorro | LINEAR | · | 3.2 km | MPC · JPL |
| 182534 | 2001 TM_{25} | — | October 14, 2001 | Socorro | LINEAR | · | 2.9 km | MPC · JPL |
| 182535 | 2001 TL_{29} | — | October 14, 2001 | Socorro | LINEAR | · | 4.7 km | MPC · JPL |
| 182536 | 2001 TN_{31} | — | October 14, 2001 | Socorro | LINEAR | EUN | 2.0 km | MPC · JPL |
| 182537 | 2001 TH_{35} | — | October 14, 2001 | Socorro | LINEAR | · | 3.7 km | MPC · JPL |
| 182538 | 2001 TO_{39} | — | October 14, 2001 | Socorro | LINEAR | · | 3.7 km | MPC · JPL |
| 182539 | 2001 TS_{45} | — | October 11, 2001 | Socorro | LINEAR | H | 1.1 km | MPC · JPL |
| 182540 | 2001 TS_{49} | — | October 11, 2001 | Socorro | LINEAR | · | 2.8 km | MPC · JPL |
| 182541 | 2001 TP_{51} | — | October 13, 2001 | Socorro | LINEAR | L5 | 12 km | MPC · JPL |
| 182542 | 2001 TH_{57} | — | October 13, 2001 | Socorro | LINEAR | WIT | 1.3 km | MPC · JPL |
| 182543 | 2001 TQ_{62} | — | October 13, 2001 | Socorro | LINEAR | MAR | 1.6 km | MPC · JPL |
| 182544 | 2001 TF_{64} | — | October 13, 2001 | Socorro | LINEAR | · | 2.7 km | MPC · JPL |
| 182545 | 2001 TQ_{73} | — | October 13, 2001 | Socorro | LINEAR | · | 3.1 km | MPC · JPL |
| 182546 | 2001 TE_{82} | — | October 14, 2001 | Socorro | LINEAR | · | 2.7 km | MPC · JPL |
| 182547 | 2001 TK_{83} | — | October 14, 2001 | Socorro | LINEAR | · | 1.9 km | MPC · JPL |
| 182548 | 2001 TS_{83} | — | October 14, 2001 | Socorro | LINEAR | L5 | 10 km | MPC · JPL |
| 182549 | 2001 TG_{86} | — | October 14, 2001 | Socorro | LINEAR | (5) | 1.9 km | MPC · JPL |
| 182550 | 2001 TS_{86} | — | October 14, 2001 | Socorro | LINEAR | · | 2.1 km | MPC · JPL |
| 182551 | 2001 TP_{89} | — | October 14, 2001 | Socorro | LINEAR | · | 1.9 km | MPC · JPL |
| 182552 | 2001 TA_{100} | — | October 14, 2001 | Socorro | LINEAR | · | 2.7 km | MPC · JPL |
| 182553 | 2001 TW_{100} | — | October 14, 2001 | Socorro | LINEAR | · | 2.4 km | MPC · JPL |
| 182554 | 2001 TO_{111} | — | October 14, 2001 | Socorro | LINEAR | · | 2.3 km | MPC · JPL |
| 182555 | 2001 TZ_{112} | — | October 14, 2001 | Socorro | LINEAR | · | 1.9 km | MPC · JPL |
| 182556 | 2001 TD_{113} | — | October 14, 2001 | Socorro | LINEAR | · | 2.9 km | MPC · JPL |
| 182557 | 2001 TW_{114} | — | October 14, 2001 | Socorro | LINEAR | EUN | 2.2 km | MPC · JPL |
| 182558 | 2001 TX_{115} | — | October 14, 2001 | Socorro | LINEAR | · | 2.5 km | MPC · JPL |
| 182559 | 2001 TM_{126} | — | October 13, 2001 | Kitt Peak | Spacewatch | · | 2.1 km | MPC · JPL |
| 182560 | 2001 TE_{129} | — | October 14, 2001 | Kitt Peak | Spacewatch | · | 1.8 km | MPC · JPL |
| 182561 | 2001 TG_{130} | — | October 15, 2001 | Kitt Peak | Spacewatch | · | 2.7 km | MPC · JPL |
| 182562 | 2001 TK_{138} | — | October 10, 2001 | Palomar | NEAT | · | 1.7 km | MPC · JPL |
| 182563 | 2001 TA_{139} | — | October 10, 2001 | Palomar | NEAT | · | 2.6 km | MPC · JPL |
| 182564 | 2001 TL_{139} | — | October 10, 2001 | Palomar | NEAT | · | 1.5 km | MPC · JPL |
| 182565 | 2001 TN_{145} | — | October 10, 2001 | Palomar | NEAT | · | 1.9 km | MPC · JPL |
| 182566 | 2001 TT_{145} | — | October 10, 2001 | Palomar | NEAT | · | 2.6 km | MPC · JPL |
| 182567 | 2001 TQ_{146} | — | October 10, 2001 | Palomar | NEAT | AGN | 1.5 km | MPC · JPL |
| 182568 | 2001 TS_{148} | — | October 10, 2001 | Palomar | NEAT | · | 2.9 km | MPC · JPL |
| 182569 | 2001 TN_{149} | — | October 10, 2001 | Palomar | NEAT | · | 2.0 km | MPC · JPL |
| 182570 | 2001 TG_{151} | — | October 10, 2001 | Palomar | NEAT | · | 4.8 km | MPC · JPL |
| 182571 | 2001 TP_{156} | — | October 14, 2001 | Kitt Peak | Spacewatch | · | 2.4 km | MPC · JPL |
| 182572 | 2001 TM_{158} | — | October 11, 2001 | Palomar | NEAT | · | 2.7 km | MPC · JPL |
| 182573 | 2001 TF_{160} | — | October 15, 2001 | Palomar | NEAT | · | 2.1 km | MPC · JPL |
| 182574 | 2001 TR_{164} | — | October 11, 2001 | Palomar | NEAT | · | 2.4 km | MPC · JPL |
| 182575 | 2001 TC_{173} | — | October 13, 2001 | Socorro | LINEAR | · | 2.8 km | MPC · JPL |
| 182576 | 2001 TW_{174} | — | October 15, 2001 | Socorro | LINEAR | · | 2.0 km | MPC · JPL |
| 182577 | 2001 TB_{175} | — | October 15, 2001 | Socorro | LINEAR | NEM | 2.1 km | MPC · JPL |
| 182578 | 2001 TF_{175} | — | October 14, 2001 | Socorro | LINEAR | EUN | 2.1 km | MPC · JPL |
| 182579 | 2001 TK_{176} | — | October 14, 2001 | Socorro | LINEAR | · | 1.6 km | MPC · JPL |
| 182580 | 2001 TA_{177} | — | October 14, 2001 | Socorro | LINEAR | PAD | 2.0 km | MPC · JPL |
| 182581 | 2001 TA_{187} | — | October 14, 2001 | Socorro | LINEAR | · | 2.3 km | MPC · JPL |
| 182582 | 2001 TK_{192} | — | October 14, 2001 | Socorro | LINEAR | · | 2.6 km | MPC · JPL |
| 182583 | 2001 TH_{198} | — | October 11, 2001 | Socorro | LINEAR | (5) | 1.6 km | MPC · JPL |
| 182584 | 2001 TO_{207} | — | October 11, 2001 | Palomar | NEAT | · | 4.8 km | MPC · JPL |
| 182585 | 2001 TB_{219} | — | October 14, 2001 | Anderson Mesa | LONEOS | · | 5.4 km | MPC · JPL |
| 182586 | 2001 TB_{224} | — | October 14, 2001 | Socorro | LINEAR | · | 1.5 km | MPC · JPL |
| 182587 | 2001 TX_{224} | — | October 14, 2001 | Socorro | LINEAR | · | 3.8 km | MPC · JPL |
| 182588 | 2001 TA_{226} | — | October 14, 2001 | Palomar | NEAT | EUN | 2.3 km | MPC · JPL |
| 182589 | 2001 TV_{230} | — | October 15, 2001 | Palomar | NEAT | · | 3.1 km | MPC · JPL |
| 182590 Vladisvujnovic | 2001 TA_{245} | Vladisvujnovic | October 14, 2001 | Apache Point | SDSS | (12739) | 1.8 km | MPC · JPL |
| 182591 Mocescobedo | 2001 TG_{247} | Mocescobedo | October 14, 2001 | Apache Point | SDSS | · | 2.1 km | MPC · JPL |
| 182592 Jolana | 2001 TF_{257} | Jolana | October 8, 2001 | Palomar | NEAT | · | 2.3 km | MPC · JPL |
| 182593 | 2001 UL_{1} | — | October 19, 2001 | Nacogdoches | Stephen F. Austin State University Observatory | · | 2.5 km | MPC · JPL |
| 182594 | 2001 UD_{2} | — | October 17, 2001 | Socorro | LINEAR | H | 860 m | MPC · JPL |
| 182595 | 2001 UH_{18} | — | October 29, 2001 | Emerald Lane | L. Ball | · | 2.7 km | MPC · JPL |
| 182596 | 2001 US_{21} | — | October 17, 2001 | Socorro | LINEAR | H | 1.2 km | MPC · JPL |
| 182597 | 2001 UE_{28} | — | October 16, 2001 | Socorro | LINEAR | · | 2.7 km | MPC · JPL |
| 182598 | 2001 UA_{32} | — | October 16, 2001 | Socorro | LINEAR | PAD | 4.9 km | MPC · JPL |
| 182599 | 2001 UE_{33} | — | October 16, 2001 | Socorro | LINEAR | · | 1.5 km | MPC · JPL |
| 182600 | 2001 UL_{35} | — | October 16, 2001 | Socorro | LINEAR | · | 4.2 km | MPC · JPL |

== 182601–182700 ==
back to top

| Designation | | | Discovery | | | Properties | | Ref |
| Permanent | Provisional | Named after | Date | Site | Discoverer(s) | Category | Diam. | Ref |
|---|---|---|---|---|---|---|---|---|
| 182601 | 2001 UF_{41} | — | October 17, 2001 | Socorro | LINEAR | · | 2.7 km | MPC · JPL |
| 182602 | 2001 UC_{43} | — | October 17, 2001 | Socorro | LINEAR | · | 3.1 km | MPC · JPL |
| 182603 | 2001 UF_{43} | — | October 17, 2001 | Socorro | LINEAR | (5) | 2.0 km | MPC · JPL |
| 182604 | 2001 UK_{47} | — | October 17, 2001 | Socorro | LINEAR | · | 2.2 km | MPC · JPL |
| 182605 | 2001 UM_{47} | — | October 17, 2001 | Socorro | LINEAR | (5) | 1.8 km | MPC · JPL |
| 182606 | 2001 UU_{47} | — | October 17, 2001 | Socorro | LINEAR | · | 2.5 km | MPC · JPL |
| 182607 | 2001 UN_{48} | — | October 17, 2001 | Socorro | LINEAR | · | 2.2 km | MPC · JPL |
| 182608 | 2001 UN_{49} | — | October 17, 2001 | Socorro | LINEAR | · | 3.4 km | MPC · JPL |
| 182609 | 2001 US_{58} | — | October 17, 2001 | Socorro | LINEAR | · | 2.6 km | MPC · JPL |
| 182610 | 2001 UX_{58} | — | October 17, 2001 | Socorro | LINEAR | · | 3.3 km | MPC · JPL |
| 182611 | 2001 UJ_{59} | — | October 17, 2001 | Socorro | LINEAR | · | 1.7 km | MPC · JPL |
| 182612 | 2001 UX_{60} | — | October 17, 2001 | Socorro | LINEAR | · | 2.7 km | MPC · JPL |
| 182613 | 2001 UJ_{61} | — | October 17, 2001 | Socorro | LINEAR | · | 2.4 km | MPC · JPL |
| 182614 | 2001 UT_{70} | — | October 17, 2001 | Kitt Peak | Spacewatch | · | 2.3 km | MPC · JPL |
| 182615 | 2001 UM_{79} | — | October 20, 2001 | Socorro | LINEAR | WIT | 1.6 km | MPC · JPL |
| 182616 | 2001 UL_{80} | — | October 20, 2001 | Socorro | LINEAR | · | 2.3 km | MPC · JPL |
| 182617 | 2001 UT_{82} | — | October 20, 2001 | Socorro | LINEAR | · | 3.2 km | MPC · JPL |
| 182618 | 2001 UT_{91} | — | October 18, 2001 | Palomar | NEAT | EUN | 1.8 km | MPC · JPL |
| 182619 | 2001 UJ_{101} | — | October 20, 2001 | Socorro | LINEAR | THM | 2.7 km | MPC · JPL |
| 182620 | 2001 UL_{101} | — | October 20, 2001 | Socorro | LINEAR | · | 2.4 km | MPC · JPL |
| 182621 | 2001 UO_{101} | — | October 20, 2001 | Socorro | LINEAR | THM | 2.9 km | MPC · JPL |
| 182622 | 2001 UN_{106} | — | October 20, 2001 | Socorro | LINEAR | · | 2.2 km | MPC · JPL |
| 182623 | 2001 UO_{108} | — | October 20, 2001 | Socorro | LINEAR | · | 4.1 km | MPC · JPL |
| 182624 | 2001 UA_{114} | — | October 22, 2001 | Socorro | LINEAR | · | 3.7 km | MPC · JPL |
| 182625 | 2001 UF_{114} | — | October 22, 2001 | Socorro | LINEAR | L5 | 16 km | MPC · JPL |
| 182626 | 2001 UW_{117} | — | October 22, 2001 | Socorro | LINEAR | 615 | 2.0 km | MPC · JPL |
| 182627 | 2001 UC_{124} | — | October 22, 2001 | Palomar | NEAT | L5 | 16 km | MPC · JPL |
| 182628 | 2001 UK_{126} | — | October 23, 2001 | Palomar | NEAT | · | 2.8 km | MPC · JPL |
| 182629 | 2001 UM_{131} | — | October 20, 2001 | Socorro | LINEAR | · | 2.7 km | MPC · JPL |
| 182630 | 2001 UE_{138} | — | October 23, 2001 | Socorro | LINEAR | · | 2.3 km | MPC · JPL |
| 182631 | 2001 UP_{143} | — | October 23, 2001 | Socorro | LINEAR | · | 2.2 km | MPC · JPL |
| 182632 | 2001 UJ_{144} | — | October 23, 2001 | Socorro | LINEAR | · | 1.8 km | MPC · JPL |
| 182633 | 2001 UX_{145} | — | October 23, 2001 | Socorro | LINEAR | · | 3.2 km | MPC · JPL |
| 182634 | 2001 UV_{146} | — | October 23, 2001 | Socorro | LINEAR | AGN | 1.5 km | MPC · JPL |
| 182635 | 2001 UL_{148} | — | October 23, 2001 | Socorro | LINEAR | · | 2.9 km | MPC · JPL |
| 182636 | 2001 UJ_{151} | — | October 23, 2001 | Socorro | LINEAR | · | 2.5 km | MPC · JPL |
| 182637 | 2001 UR_{151} | — | October 23, 2001 | Socorro | LINEAR | · | 2.1 km | MPC · JPL |
| 182638 | 2001 UL_{152} | — | October 23, 2001 | Socorro | LINEAR | AGN | 2.0 km | MPC · JPL |
| 182639 | 2001 UM_{155} | — | October 23, 2001 | Socorro | LINEAR | · | 2.2 km | MPC · JPL |
| 182640 | 2001 UM_{156} | — | October 23, 2001 | Socorro | LINEAR | · | 3.0 km | MPC · JPL |
| 182641 | 2001 UH_{159} | — | October 23, 2001 | Socorro | LINEAR | · | 3.0 km | MPC · JPL |
| 182642 | 2001 UO_{160} | — | October 23, 2001 | Socorro | LINEAR | · | 2.3 km | MPC · JPL |
| 182643 | 2001 UO_{161} | — | October 23, 2001 | Socorro | LINEAR | GEF | 1.9 km | MPC · JPL |
| 182644 | 2001 UH_{162} | — | October 23, 2001 | Socorro | LINEAR | · | 3.1 km | MPC · JPL |
| 182645 | 2001 UL_{162} | — | October 23, 2001 | Socorro | LINEAR | · | 2.4 km | MPC · JPL |
| 182646 | 2001 UH_{165} | — | October 23, 2001 | Palomar | NEAT | EOS | 2.8 km | MPC · JPL |
| 182647 | 2001 UA_{170} | — | October 21, 2001 | Socorro | LINEAR | L5 | 18 km | MPC · JPL |
| 182648 | 2001 UJ_{175} | — | October 24, 2001 | Palomar | NEAT | · | 2.5 km | MPC · JPL |
| 182649 | 2001 UT_{176} | — | October 20, 2001 | Socorro | LINEAR | · | 2.0 km | MPC · JPL |
| 182650 | 2001 UL_{177} | — | October 21, 2001 | Socorro | LINEAR | · | 2.9 km | MPC · JPL |
| 182651 | 2001 UD_{178} | — | October 24, 2001 | Socorro | LINEAR | · | 1.7 km | MPC · JPL |
| 182652 | 2001 UU_{182} | — | October 16, 2001 | Socorro | LINEAR | · | 2.5 km | MPC · JPL |
| 182653 | 2001 UK_{187} | — | October 17, 2001 | Palomar | NEAT | · | 2.7 km | MPC · JPL |
| 182654 | 2001 UC_{188} | — | October 17, 2001 | Socorro | LINEAR | · | 2.9 km | MPC · JPL |
| 182655 | 2001 UE_{194} | — | October 18, 2001 | Palomar | NEAT | · | 1.9 km | MPC · JPL |
| 182656 | 2001 UF_{195} | — | October 18, 2001 | Palomar | NEAT | · | 2.1 km | MPC · JPL |
| 182657 | 2001 UZ_{195} | — | October 18, 2001 | Palomar | NEAT | · | 2.2 km | MPC · JPL |
| 182658 | 2001 UE_{196} | — | October 18, 2001 | Palomar | NEAT | · | 2.4 km | MPC · JPL |
| 182659 | 2001 UK_{196} | — | October 18, 2001 | Kitt Peak | Spacewatch | AGN | 1.4 km | MPC · JPL |
| 182660 | 2001 UT_{197} | — | October 19, 2001 | Palomar | NEAT | HOF | 3.9 km | MPC · JPL |
| 182661 | 2001 UY_{201} | — | October 19, 2001 | Palomar | NEAT | · | 1.8 km | MPC · JPL |
| 182662 | 2001 UG_{203} | — | October 19, 2001 | Palomar | NEAT | · | 3.0 km | MPC · JPL |
| 182663 | 2001 UP_{204} | — | October 19, 2001 | Palomar | NEAT | EUN | 2.0 km | MPC · JPL |
| 182664 | 2001 UT_{204} | — | October 19, 2001 | Palomar | NEAT | · | 2.5 km | MPC · JPL |
| 182665 | 2001 UV_{204} | — | October 19, 2001 | Palomar | NEAT | · | 2.6 km | MPC · JPL |
| 182666 | 2001 UG_{206} | — | October 20, 2001 | Kitt Peak | Spacewatch | L5 | 14 km | MPC · JPL |
| 182667 | 2001 UG_{207} | — | October 20, 2001 | Socorro | LINEAR | HOF | 2.7 km | MPC · JPL |
| 182668 | 2001 UO_{208} | — | October 20, 2001 | Kitt Peak | Spacewatch | EUN | 2.0 km | MPC · JPL |
| 182669 | 2001 UZ_{214} | — | October 23, 2001 | Kitt Peak | Spacewatch | L5 · fast | 11 km | MPC · JPL |
| 182670 | 2001 UA_{215} | — | October 23, 2001 | Socorro | LINEAR | · | 2.0 km | MPC · JPL |
| 182671 | 2001 UR_{221} | — | October 24, 2001 | Socorro | LINEAR | AST | 2.9 km | MPC · JPL |
| 182672 | 2001 UU_{221} | — | October 24, 2001 | Socorro | LINEAR | · | 2.3 km | MPC · JPL |
| 182673 | 2001 UC_{222} | — | October 25, 2001 | Socorro | LINEAR | BRA | 3.2 km | MPC · JPL |
| 182674 Hanslmeier | 2001 UB_{225} | Hanslmeier | October 25, 2001 | Apache Point | SDSS | · | 3.0 km | MPC · JPL |
| 182675 | 2001 UA_{226} | — | October 16, 2001 | Palomar | NEAT | L5 | 10 km | MPC · JPL |
| 182676 | 2001 UQ_{227} | — | October 16, 2001 | Palomar | NEAT | HOF | 2.8 km | MPC · JPL |
| 182677 | 2001 UH_{228} | — | October 24, 2001 | Palomar | NEAT | · | 2.7 km | MPC · JPL |
| 182678 | 2001 VM_{1} | — | November 9, 2001 | Palomar | NEAT | · | 3.2 km | MPC · JPL |
| 182679 | 2001 VP_{6} | — | November 9, 2001 | Socorro | LINEAR | · | 2.2 km | MPC · JPL |
| 182680 | 2001 VV_{7} | — | November 9, 2001 | Socorro | LINEAR | · | 4.0 km | MPC · JPL |
| 182681 | 2001 VE_{18} | — | November 9, 2001 | Socorro | LINEAR | · | 3.4 km | MPC · JPL |
| 182682 | 2001 VV_{18} | — | November 9, 2001 | Socorro | LINEAR | · | 2.3 km | MPC · JPL |
| 182683 | 2001 VS_{22} | — | November 9, 2001 | Socorro | LINEAR | · | 2.3 km | MPC · JPL |
| 182684 | 2001 VW_{24} | — | November 9, 2001 | Socorro | LINEAR | · | 3.1 km | MPC · JPL |
| 182685 | 2001 VN_{25} | — | November 9, 2001 | Socorro | LINEAR | · | 2.9 km | MPC · JPL |
| 182686 | 2001 VJ_{38} | — | November 9, 2001 | Socorro | LINEAR | · | 2.5 km | MPC · JPL |
| 182687 | 2001 VQ_{39} | — | November 9, 2001 | Socorro | LINEAR | · | 3.4 km | MPC · JPL |
| 182688 | 2001 VQ_{45} | — | November 9, 2001 | Socorro | LINEAR | H | 1.0 km | MPC · JPL |
| 182689 | 2001 VL_{46} | — | November 9, 2001 | Socorro | LINEAR | slow | 7.5 km | MPC · JPL |
| 182690 | 2001 VH_{49} | — | November 10, 2001 | Socorro | LINEAR | TIR | 4.8 km | MPC · JPL |
| 182691 | 2001 VT_{49} | — | November 10, 2001 | Socorro | LINEAR | · | 2.3 km | MPC · JPL |
| 182692 | 2001 VH_{62} | — | November 10, 2001 | Socorro | LINEAR | · | 3.5 km | MPC · JPL |
| 182693 | 2001 VW_{70} | — | November 11, 2001 | Socorro | LINEAR | · | 2.1 km | MPC · JPL |
| 182694 | 2001 VJ_{73} | — | November 12, 2001 | Kitt Peak | Spacewatch | · | 2.2 km | MPC · JPL |
| 182695 | 2001 VV_{76} | — | November 15, 2001 | Socorro | LINEAR | H | 860 m | MPC · JPL |
| 182696 | 2001 VA_{95} | — | November 15, 2001 | Socorro | LINEAR | · | 4.0 km | MPC · JPL |
| 182697 | 2001 VM_{96} | — | November 15, 2001 | Socorro | LINEAR | · | 2.5 km | MPC · JPL |
| 182698 | 2001 VV_{97} | — | November 15, 2001 | Socorro | LINEAR | · | 3.3 km | MPC · JPL |
| 182699 | 2001 VM_{100} | — | November 12, 2001 | Anderson Mesa | LONEOS | · | 6.9 km | MPC · JPL |
| 182700 | 2001 VB_{112} | — | November 12, 2001 | Socorro | LINEAR | MRX | 1.5 km | MPC · JPL |

== 182701–182800 ==
back to top

| Designation | | | Discovery | | | Properties | | Ref |
| Permanent | Provisional | Named after | Date | Site | Discoverer(s) | Category | Diam. | Ref |
|---|---|---|---|---|---|---|---|---|
| 182701 | 2001 VB_{115} | — | November 12, 2001 | Socorro | LINEAR | AGN | 1.7 km | MPC · JPL |
| 182702 | 2001 VY_{119} | — | November 12, 2001 | Socorro | LINEAR | ADE | 3.4 km | MPC · JPL |
| 182703 | 2001 VD_{124} | — | November 12, 2001 | Anderson Mesa | LONEOS | · | 3.1 km | MPC · JPL |
| 182704 | 2001 WB_{3} | — | November 16, 2001 | Kitt Peak | Spacewatch | · | 2.1 km | MPC · JPL |
| 182705 | 2001 WX_{7} | — | November 17, 2001 | Socorro | LINEAR | · | 5.5 km | MPC · JPL |
| 182706 | 2001 WG_{10} | — | November 17, 2001 | Socorro | LINEAR | EOS | 3.0 km | MPC · JPL |
| 182707 | 2001 WA_{12} | — | November 17, 2001 | Socorro | LINEAR | AGN | 2.0 km | MPC · JPL |
| 182708 | 2001 WJ_{13} | — | November 17, 2001 | Socorro | LINEAR | · | 3.5 km | MPC · JPL |
| 182709 | 2001 WX_{15} | — | November 25, 2001 | Socorro | LINEAR | H | 990 m | MPC · JPL |
| 182710 | 2001 WJ_{16} | — | November 17, 2001 | Socorro | LINEAR | · | 4.2 km | MPC · JPL |
| 182711 | 2001 WZ_{16} | — | November 17, 2001 | Socorro | LINEAR | · | 2.4 km | MPC · JPL |
| 182712 | 2001 WQ_{18} | — | November 17, 2001 | Socorro | LINEAR | · | 3.1 km | MPC · JPL |
| 182713 | 2001 WK_{20} | — | November 17, 2001 | Socorro | LINEAR | · | 3.1 km | MPC · JPL |
| 182714 | 2001 WN_{25} | — | November 17, 2001 | Socorro | LINEAR | (17392) | 1.9 km | MPC · JPL |
| 182715 | 2001 WA_{38} | — | November 17, 2001 | Socorro | LINEAR | · | 2.5 km | MPC · JPL |
| 182716 | 2001 WZ_{40} | — | November 17, 2001 | Socorro | LINEAR | · | 4.0 km | MPC · JPL |
| 182717 | 2001 WO_{46} | — | November 19, 2001 | Socorro | LINEAR | · | 2.6 km | MPC · JPL |
| 182718 | 2001 WR_{47} | — | November 19, 2001 | Anderson Mesa | LONEOS | EUN | 1.7 km | MPC · JPL |
| 182719 | 2001 WP_{53} | — | November 19, 2001 | Socorro | LINEAR | · | 3.1 km | MPC · JPL |
| 182720 | 2001 WW_{54} | — | November 19, 2001 | Socorro | LINEAR | · | 2.0 km | MPC · JPL |
| 182721 | 2001 WE_{56} | — | November 19, 2001 | Socorro | LINEAR | · | 2.5 km | MPC · JPL |
| 182722 | 2001 WC_{57} | — | November 19, 2001 | Socorro | LINEAR | · | 2.8 km | MPC · JPL |
| 182723 | 2001 WL_{58} | — | November 19, 2001 | Socorro | LINEAR | AGN | 1.5 km | MPC · JPL |
| 182724 | 2001 WN_{68} | — | November 20, 2001 | Socorro | LINEAR | · | 2.6 km | MPC · JPL |
| 182725 | 2001 WF_{70} | — | November 20, 2001 | Socorro | LINEAR | AGN | 1.8 km | MPC · JPL |
| 182726 | 2001 WY_{80} | — | November 20, 2001 | Socorro | LINEAR | KOR | 1.8 km | MPC · JPL |
| 182727 | 2001 WA_{100} | — | November 24, 2001 | Socorro | LINEAR | WIT | 1.5 km | MPC · JPL |
| 182728 | 2001 WM_{100} | — | November 16, 2001 | Kitt Peak | Spacewatch | · | 2.4 km | MPC · JPL |
| 182729 | 2001 WR_{100} | — | November 16, 2001 | Kitt Peak | Spacewatch | AGN | 1.8 km | MPC · JPL |
| 182730 Muminovic | 2001 WX_{103} | Muminovic | November 21, 2001 | Apache Point | SDSS | · | 2.6 km | MPC · JPL |
| 182731 | 2001 XW_{1} | — | December 7, 2001 | Socorro | LINEAR | H | 1.1 km | MPC · JPL |
| 182732 | 2001 XH_{6} | — | December 7, 2001 | Socorro | LINEAR | · | 3.1 km | MPC · JPL |
| 182733 | 2001 XV_{45} | — | December 9, 2001 | Socorro | LINEAR | EOS | 4.4 km | MPC · JPL |
| 182734 | 2001 XW_{45} | — | December 9, 2001 | Socorro | LINEAR | · | 3.1 km | MPC · JPL |
| 182735 | 2001 XE_{47} | — | December 9, 2001 | Socorro | LINEAR | · | 3.7 km | MPC · JPL |
| 182736 | 2001 XX_{53} | — | December 10, 2001 | Socorro | LINEAR | · | 2.8 km | MPC · JPL |
| 182737 | 2001 XZ_{69} | — | December 11, 2001 | Socorro | LINEAR | GEF | 1.4 km | MPC · JPL |
| 182738 | 2001 XS_{70} | — | December 11, 2001 | Socorro | LINEAR | · | 3.0 km | MPC · JPL |
| 182739 | 2001 XZ_{71} | — | December 11, 2001 | Socorro | LINEAR | KOR | 1.9 km | MPC · JPL |
| 182740 | 2001 XT_{74} | — | December 11, 2001 | Socorro | LINEAR | · | 4.8 km | MPC · JPL |
| 182741 | 2001 XU_{77} | — | December 11, 2001 | Socorro | LINEAR | · | 2.9 km | MPC · JPL |
| 182742 | 2001 XW_{78} | — | December 11, 2001 | Socorro | LINEAR | KOR | 2.0 km | MPC · JPL |
| 182743 | 2001 XM_{84} | — | December 11, 2001 | Socorro | LINEAR | · | 2.9 km | MPC · JPL |
| 182744 | 2001 XF_{90} | — | December 10, 2001 | Socorro | LINEAR | (5) | 1.9 km | MPC · JPL |
| 182745 | 2001 XY_{104} | — | December 14, 2001 | Kitt Peak | Spacewatch | · | 2.5 km | MPC · JPL |
| 182746 | 2001 XV_{105} | — | December 10, 2001 | Socorro | LINEAR | L5 | 21 km | MPC · JPL |
| 182747 | 2001 XS_{107} | — | December 10, 2001 | Socorro | LINEAR | · | 5.3 km | MPC · JPL |
| 182748 | 2001 XJ_{110} | — | December 11, 2001 | Socorro | LINEAR | (5) | 1.7 km | MPC · JPL |
| 182749 | 2001 XA_{118} | — | December 13, 2001 | Socorro | LINEAR | · | 3.9 km | MPC · JPL |
| 182750 | 2001 XK_{124} | — | December 14, 2001 | Socorro | LINEAR | AGN | 1.9 km | MPC · JPL |
| 182751 | 2001 XP_{129} | — | December 14, 2001 | Socorro | LINEAR | · | 1.9 km | MPC · JPL |
| 182752 | 2001 XS_{131} | — | December 14, 2001 | Socorro | LINEAR | · | 2.2 km | MPC · JPL |
| 182753 | 2001 XZ_{133} | — | December 14, 2001 | Socorro | LINEAR | · | 2.8 km | MPC · JPL |
| 182754 | 2001 XQ_{136} | — | December 14, 2001 | Socorro | LINEAR | · | 2.0 km | MPC · JPL |
| 182755 | 2001 XF_{143} | — | December 14, 2001 | Socorro | LINEAR | · | 2.2 km | MPC · JPL |
| 182756 | 2001 XZ_{148} | — | December 14, 2001 | Socorro | LINEAR | · | 2.1 km | MPC · JPL |
| 182757 | 2001 XR_{152} | — | December 14, 2001 | Socorro | LINEAR | · | 2.6 km | MPC · JPL |
| 182758 | 2001 XO_{161} | — | December 14, 2001 | Socorro | LINEAR | · | 2.8 km | MPC · JPL |
| 182759 | 2001 XL_{162} | — | December 14, 2001 | Socorro | LINEAR | · | 2.5 km | MPC · JPL |
| 182760 | 2001 XX_{162} | — | December 14, 2001 | Socorro | LINEAR | KOR | 2.0 km | MPC · JPL |
| 182761 | 2001 XY_{166} | — | December 14, 2001 | Socorro | LINEAR | LEO | 3.5 km | MPC · JPL |
| 182762 | 2001 XD_{167} | — | December 14, 2001 | Socorro | LINEAR | · | 2.7 km | MPC · JPL |
| 182763 | 2001 XT_{180} | — | December 14, 2001 | Socorro | LINEAR | · | 3.3 km | MPC · JPL |
| 182764 | 2001 XL_{184} | — | December 14, 2001 | Socorro | LINEAR | EMA | 6.5 km | MPC · JPL |
| 182765 | 2001 XY_{201} | — | December 14, 2001 | Kitt Peak | Spacewatch | · | 2.5 km | MPC · JPL |
| 182766 | 2001 XX_{202} | — | December 11, 2001 | Socorro | LINEAR | · | 2.5 km | MPC · JPL |
| 182767 | 2001 XZ_{209} | — | December 11, 2001 | Socorro | LINEAR | · | 3.1 km | MPC · JPL |
| 182768 | 2001 XD_{216} | — | December 14, 2001 | Socorro | LINEAR | KOR | 1.9 km | MPC · JPL |
| 182769 | 2001 XL_{219} | — | December 15, 2001 | Socorro | LINEAR | · | 2.6 km | MPC · JPL |
| 182770 | 2001 XZ_{223} | — | December 15, 2001 | Socorro | LINEAR | WIT | 1.4 km | MPC · JPL |
| 182771 | 2001 XD_{233} | — | December 15, 2001 | Socorro | LINEAR | · | 4.4 km | MPC · JPL |
| 182772 | 2001 XP_{242} | — | December 14, 2001 | Socorro | LINEAR | · | 2.4 km | MPC · JPL |
| 182773 | 2001 XU_{242} | — | December 14, 2001 | Socorro | LINEAR | THM | 2.7 km | MPC · JPL |
| 182774 | 2001 XC_{253} | — | December 14, 2001 | Socorro | LINEAR | · | 2.4 km | MPC · JPL |
| 182775 | 2001 XC_{256} | — | December 5, 2001 | Haleakala | NEAT | H · slow | 990 m | MPC · JPL |
| 182776 | 2001 XJ_{261} | — | December 11, 2001 | Socorro | LINEAR | BRA | 2.8 km | MPC · JPL |
| 182777 | 2001 YC_{7} | — | December 17, 2001 | Socorro | LINEAR | · | 4.4 km | MPC · JPL |
| 182778 | 2001 YK_{22} | — | December 18, 2001 | Socorro | LINEAR | · | 3.0 km | MPC · JPL |
| 182779 | 2001 YR_{49} | — | December 18, 2001 | Socorro | LINEAR | · | 3.5 km | MPC · JPL |
| 182780 | 2001 YH_{63} | — | December 18, 2001 | Socorro | LINEAR | · | 3.9 km | MPC · JPL |
| 182781 | 2001 YO_{97} | — | December 17, 2001 | Socorro | LINEAR | · | 2.3 km | MPC · JPL |
| 182782 | 2001 YW_{112} | — | December 18, 2001 | Palomar | NEAT | · | 3.6 km | MPC · JPL |
| 182783 | 2001 YH_{123} | — | December 17, 2001 | Socorro | LINEAR | · | 3.4 km | MPC · JPL |
| 182784 | 2001 YX_{123} | — | December 17, 2001 | Socorro | LINEAR | · | 5.5 km | MPC · JPL |
| 182785 | 2001 YJ_{134} | — | December 17, 2001 | Socorro | LINEAR | WIT | 1.6 km | MPC · JPL |
| 182786 Dankobosanac | 2001 YU_{158} | Dankobosanac | December 18, 2001 | Apache Point | SDSS | · | 4.2 km | MPC · JPL |
| 182787 | 2002 AE_{8} | — | January 5, 2002 | Kitt Peak | Spacewatch | · | 3.8 km | MPC · JPL |
| 182788 | 2002 AX_{11} | — | January 10, 2002 | Campo Imperatore | CINEOS | · | 3.1 km | MPC · JPL |
| 182789 | 2002 AJ_{17} | — | January 9, 2002 | Socorro | LINEAR | H | 940 m | MPC · JPL |
| 182790 | 2002 AJ_{18} | — | January 8, 2002 | Cima Ekar | ADAS | · | 4.4 km | MPC · JPL |
| 182791 | 2002 AN_{19} | — | January 8, 2002 | Socorro | LINEAR | KOR | 1.8 km | MPC · JPL |
| 182792 | 2002 AM_{23} | — | January 5, 2002 | Haleakala | NEAT | EOS | 3.3 km | MPC · JPL |
| 182793 | 2002 AG_{30} | — | January 9, 2002 | Socorro | LINEAR | · | 2.0 km | MPC · JPL |
| 182794 | 2002 AN_{46} | — | January 9, 2002 | Socorro | LINEAR | · | 3.5 km | MPC · JPL |
| 182795 | 2002 AX_{47} | — | January 9, 2002 | Socorro | LINEAR | · | 2.5 km | MPC · JPL |
| 182796 | 2002 AS_{56} | — | January 9, 2002 | Socorro | LINEAR | · | 4.7 km | MPC · JPL |
| 182797 | 2002 AP_{58} | — | January 9, 2002 | Socorro | LINEAR | · | 4.0 km | MPC · JPL |
| 182798 | 2002 AH_{69} | — | January 13, 2002 | Kitt Peak | Spacewatch | THM | 2.5 km | MPC · JPL |
| 182799 | 2002 AN_{72} | — | January 8, 2002 | Socorro | LINEAR | EOS | 3.0 km | MPC · JPL |
| 182800 | 2002 AA_{88} | — | January 9, 2002 | Socorro | LINEAR | · | 4.1 km | MPC · JPL |

== 182801–182900 ==
back to top

| Designation | | | Discovery | | | Properties | | Ref |
| Permanent | Provisional | Named after | Date | Site | Discoverer(s) | Category | Diam. | Ref |
|---|---|---|---|---|---|---|---|---|
| 182801 | 2002 AQ_{94} | — | January 8, 2002 | Socorro | LINEAR | PAD | 2.6 km | MPC · JPL |
| 182802 | 2002 AW_{97} | — | January 8, 2002 | Socorro | LINEAR | · | 3.4 km | MPC · JPL |
| 182803 | 2002 AV_{99} | — | January 8, 2002 | Socorro | LINEAR | · | 3.0 km | MPC · JPL |
| 182804 | 2002 AO_{101} | — | January 8, 2002 | Socorro | LINEAR | · | 3.7 km | MPC · JPL |
| 182805 | 2002 AP_{101} | — | January 8, 2002 | Socorro | LINEAR | · | 3.9 km | MPC · JPL |
| 182806 | 2002 AD_{108} | — | January 9, 2002 | Socorro | LINEAR | · | 4.0 km | MPC · JPL |
| 182807 | 2002 AG_{123} | — | January 9, 2002 | Socorro | LINEAR | EOS | 3.2 km | MPC · JPL |
| 182808 | 2002 AV_{123} | — | January 9, 2002 | Socorro | LINEAR | EOS | 5.1 km | MPC · JPL |
| 182809 | 2002 AH_{125} | — | January 11, 2002 | Socorro | LINEAR | · | 5.4 km | MPC · JPL |
| 182810 | 2002 AB_{129} | — | January 13, 2002 | Socorro | LINEAR | H | 940 m | MPC · JPL |
| 182811 | 2002 AH_{132} | — | January 8, 2002 | Socorro | LINEAR | · | 2.4 km | MPC · JPL |
| 182812 | 2002 AL_{141} | — | January 13, 2002 | Socorro | LINEAR | · | 4.6 km | MPC · JPL |
| 182813 | 2002 AB_{143} | — | January 13, 2002 | Socorro | LINEAR | (5) | 2.2 km | MPC · JPL |
| 182814 | 2002 AV_{147} | — | January 14, 2002 | Socorro | LINEAR | · | 3.3 km | MPC · JPL |
| 182815 | 2002 AF_{151} | — | January 14, 2002 | Socorro | LINEAR | · | 5.3 km | MPC · JPL |
| 182816 | 2002 AK_{151} | — | January 14, 2002 | Socorro | LINEAR | EOS | 4.1 km | MPC · JPL |
| 182817 | 2002 AV_{151} | — | January 14, 2002 | Socorro | LINEAR | · | 5.8 km | MPC · JPL |
| 182818 | 2002 AP_{158} | — | January 13, 2002 | Socorro | LINEAR | · | 3.1 km | MPC · JPL |
| 182819 | 2002 AF_{184} | — | January 7, 2002 | Palomar | NEAT | · | 2.6 km | MPC · JPL |
| 182820 | 2002 AP_{185} | — | January 8, 2002 | Socorro | LINEAR | · | 3.1 km | MPC · JPL |
| 182821 | 2002 AJ_{187} | — | January 8, 2002 | Socorro | LINEAR | · | 4.4 km | MPC · JPL |
| 182822 | 2002 AJ_{190} | — | January 11, 2002 | Anderson Mesa | LONEOS | · | 3.6 km | MPC · JPL |
| 182823 | 2002 AN_{190} | — | January 11, 2002 | Anderson Mesa | LONEOS | · | 3.0 km | MPC · JPL |
| 182824 | 2002 AQ_{191} | — | January 12, 2002 | Campo Imperatore | CINEOS | · | 3.7 km | MPC · JPL |
| 182825 | 2002 AJ_{193} | — | January 12, 2002 | Kitt Peak | Spacewatch | · | 3.3 km | MPC · JPL |
| 182826 | 2002 AN_{203} | — | January 8, 2002 | Kitt Peak | Spacewatch | THM | 2.5 km | MPC · JPL |
| 182827 | 2002 AO_{209} | — | January 14, 2002 | Palomar | NEAT | EOS | 3.3 km | MPC · JPL |
| 182828 | 2002 BJ_{3} | — | January 20, 2002 | Anderson Mesa | LONEOS | EOS | 3.3 km | MPC · JPL |
| 182829 | 2002 BF_{4} | — | January 19, 2002 | Anderson Mesa | LONEOS | · | 4.0 km | MPC · JPL |
| 182830 | 2002 BS_{23} | — | January 23, 2002 | Socorro | LINEAR | · | 3.1 km | MPC · JPL |
| 182831 | 2002 BN_{28} | — | January 19, 2002 | Anderson Mesa | LONEOS | · | 3.7 km | MPC · JPL |
| 182832 | 2002 BO_{30} | — | January 21, 2002 | Anderson Mesa | LONEOS | THB | 3.8 km | MPC · JPL |
| 182833 | 2002 CG_{1} | — | February 2, 2002 | Cima Ekar | ADAS | · | 4.3 km | MPC · JPL |
| 182834 | 2002 CY_{2} | — | February 3, 2002 | Palomar | NEAT | · | 4.5 km | MPC · JPL |
| 182835 | 2002 CD_{3} | — | February 6, 2002 | Socorro | LINEAR | · | 6.0 km | MPC · JPL |
| 182836 | 2002 CM_{7} | — | February 6, 2002 | Fountain Hills | C. W. Juels, P. R. Holvorcem | · | 4.9 km | MPC · JPL |
| 182837 | 2002 CN_{9} | — | February 6, 2002 | Kitt Peak | Spacewatch | · | 2.3 km | MPC · JPL |
| 182838 | 2002 CG_{15} | — | February 9, 2002 | Desert Eagle | W. K. Y. Yeung | · | 3.9 km | MPC · JPL |
| 182839 | 2002 CK_{16} | — | February 6, 2002 | Socorro | LINEAR | H | 950 m | MPC · JPL |
| 182840 | 2002 CG_{18} | — | February 6, 2002 | Socorro | LINEAR | · | 4.0 km | MPC · JPL |
| 182841 | 2002 CU_{18} | — | February 6, 2002 | Socorro | LINEAR | URS | 5.7 km | MPC · JPL |
| 182842 | 2002 CD_{20} | — | February 4, 2002 | Palomar | NEAT | · | 4.9 km | MPC · JPL |
| 182843 | 2002 CK_{49} | — | February 3, 2002 | Haleakala | NEAT | · | 6.7 km | MPC · JPL |
| 182844 | 2002 CE_{58} | — | February 7, 2002 | Kitt Peak | Spacewatch | · | 4.4 km | MPC · JPL |
| 182845 | 2002 CK_{60} | — | February 6, 2002 | Socorro | LINEAR | · | 5.6 km | MPC · JPL |
| 182846 | 2002 CX_{85} | — | February 7, 2002 | Socorro | LINEAR | EOS | 2.9 km | MPC · JPL |
| 182847 | 2002 CP_{87} | — | February 7, 2002 | Socorro | LINEAR | · | 940 m | MPC · JPL |
| 182848 | 2002 CD_{89} | — | February 7, 2002 | Socorro | LINEAR | THM | 5.3 km | MPC · JPL |
| 182849 | 2002 CO_{90} | — | February 7, 2002 | Socorro | LINEAR | · | 3.8 km | MPC · JPL |
| 182850 | 2002 CH_{92} | — | February 7, 2002 | Socorro | LINEAR | · | 6.4 km | MPC · JPL |
| 182851 | 2002 CO_{96} | — | February 7, 2002 | Socorro | LINEAR | THM | 3.0 km | MPC · JPL |
| 182852 | 2002 CG_{101} | — | February 7, 2002 | Socorro | LINEAR | HYG | 3.9 km | MPC · JPL |
| 182853 | 2002 CB_{102} | — | February 7, 2002 | Socorro | LINEAR | · | 6.6 km | MPC · JPL |
| 182854 | 2002 CO_{119} | — | February 7, 2002 | Socorro | LINEAR | · | 4.3 km | MPC · JPL |
| 182855 | 2002 CP_{122} | — | February 7, 2002 | Socorro | LINEAR | · | 3.3 km | MPC · JPL |
| 182856 | 2002 CU_{130} | — | February 7, 2002 | Socorro | LINEAR | · | 3.4 km | MPC · JPL |
| 182857 | 2002 CD_{148} | — | February 10, 2002 | Socorro | LINEAR | · | 4.1 km | MPC · JPL |
| 182858 | 2002 CD_{149} | — | February 10, 2002 | Socorro | LINEAR | · | 4.6 km | MPC · JPL |
| 182859 | 2002 CZ_{149} | — | February 10, 2002 | Socorro | LINEAR | THM | 3.7 km | MPC · JPL |
| 182860 | 2002 CB_{150} | — | February 10, 2002 | Socorro | LINEAR | EOS | 2.8 km | MPC · JPL |
| 182861 | 2002 CN_{150} | — | February 10, 2002 | Socorro | LINEAR | · | 3.9 km | MPC · JPL |
| 182862 | 2002 CY_{167} | — | February 8, 2002 | Socorro | LINEAR | HYG | 6.7 km | MPC · JPL |
| 182863 | 2002 CP_{176} | — | February 10, 2002 | Socorro | LINEAR | · | 3.4 km | MPC · JPL |
| 182864 | 2002 CR_{179} | — | February 10, 2002 | Socorro | LINEAR | THM | 2.6 km | MPC · JPL |
| 182865 | 2002 CV_{180} | — | February 10, 2002 | Socorro | LINEAR | · | 3.6 km | MPC · JPL |
| 182866 | 2002 CD_{195} | — | February 10, 2002 | Socorro | LINEAR | · | 1.2 km | MPC · JPL |
| 182867 | 2002 CF_{200} | — | February 10, 2002 | Socorro | LINEAR | · | 4.9 km | MPC · JPL |
| 182868 | 2002 CF_{204} | — | February 10, 2002 | Socorro | LINEAR | EOS | 3.1 km | MPC · JPL |
| 182869 | 2002 CL_{206} | — | February 10, 2002 | Socorro | LINEAR | EOS | 3.9 km | MPC · JPL |
| 182870 | 2002 CS_{210} | — | February 10, 2002 | Socorro | LINEAR | HYG | 3.5 km | MPC · JPL |
| 182871 | 2002 CT_{211} | — | February 10, 2002 | Socorro | LINEAR | · | 3.8 km | MPC · JPL |
| 182872 | 2002 CU_{211} | — | February 10, 2002 | Socorro | LINEAR | · | 2.7 km | MPC · JPL |
| 182873 | 2002 CD_{222} | — | February 11, 2002 | Socorro | LINEAR | HYG | 3.3 km | MPC · JPL |
| 182874 | 2002 CC_{230} | — | February 11, 2002 | Kitt Peak | Spacewatch | HYG | 4.8 km | MPC · JPL |
| 182875 | 2002 CG_{233} | — | February 11, 2002 | Socorro | LINEAR | · | 3.9 km | MPC · JPL |
| 182876 | 2002 CZ_{238} | — | February 11, 2002 | Socorro | LINEAR | · | 3.7 km | MPC · JPL |
| 182877 | 2002 CL_{240} | — | February 11, 2002 | Socorro | LINEAR | URS | 6.3 km | MPC · JPL |
| 182878 | 2002 CQ_{247} | — | February 15, 2002 | Socorro | LINEAR | LIX | 7.6 km | MPC · JPL |
| 182879 | 2002 CP_{252} | — | February 4, 2002 | Anderson Mesa | LONEOS | EOS | 2.8 km | MPC · JPL |
| 182880 | 2002 CH_{253} | — | February 3, 2002 | Haleakala | NEAT | TIR · | 6.3 km | MPC · JPL |
| 182881 | 2002 CD_{254} | — | February 5, 2002 | Palomar | NEAT | · | 3.3 km | MPC · JPL |
| 182882 | 2002 CD_{259} | — | February 6, 2002 | Palomar | NEAT | · | 3.8 km | MPC · JPL |
| 182883 | 2002 CL_{259} | — | February 6, 2002 | Palomar | NEAT | · | 5.5 km | MPC · JPL |
| 182884 | 2002 CE_{263} | — | February 6, 2002 | Socorro | LINEAR | · | 3.0 km | MPC · JPL |
| 182885 | 2002 CF_{266} | — | February 7, 2002 | Palomar | NEAT | · | 2.1 km | MPC · JPL |
| 182886 | 2002 CA_{282} | — | February 8, 2002 | Kitt Peak | Spacewatch | · | 3.4 km | MPC · JPL |
| 182887 | 2002 CU_{292} | — | February 11, 2002 | Socorro | LINEAR | · | 5.1 km | MPC · JPL |
| 182888 | 2002 CC_{295} | — | February 10, 2002 | Anderson Mesa | LONEOS | T_{j} (2.99) | 4.5 km | MPC · JPL |
| 182889 | 2002 CH_{301} | — | February 11, 2002 | Socorro | LINEAR | HYG | 4.1 km | MPC · JPL |
| 182890 | 2002 CZ_{301} | — | February 12, 2002 | Socorro | LINEAR | · | 5.5 km | MPC · JPL |
| 182891 | 2002 CY_{302} | — | February 12, 2002 | Socorro | LINEAR | · | 5.0 km | MPC · JPL |
| 182892 | 2002 CD_{311} | — | February 10, 2002 | Socorro | LINEAR | · | 4.0 km | MPC · JPL |
| 182893 | 2002 DA_{18} | — | February 20, 2002 | Socorro | LINEAR | THM | 3.0 km | MPC · JPL |
| 182894 | 2002 DE_{18} | — | February 20, 2002 | Socorro | LINEAR | · | 5.8 km | MPC · JPL |
| 182895 | 2002 DN_{18} | — | February 21, 2002 | Socorro | LINEAR | · | 5.4 km | MPC · JPL |
| 182896 | 2002 DE_{20} | — | February 16, 2002 | Palomar | NEAT | HYG | 3.2 km | MPC · JPL |
| 182897 | 2002 EZ_{3} | — | March 10, 2002 | Cima Ekar | ADAS | THM | 3.6 km | MPC · JPL |
| 182898 | 2002 EF_{12} | — | March 14, 2002 | Desert Eagle | W. K. Y. Yeung | · | 4.0 km | MPC · JPL |
| 182899 | 2002 EE_{14} | — | March 5, 2002 | Palomar | NEAT | · | 5.3 km | MPC · JPL |
| 182900 | 2002 EG_{15} | — | March 5, 2002 | Palomar | NEAT | THM | 3.3 km | MPC · JPL |

== 182901–183000 ==
back to top

| Designation | | | Discovery | | | Properties | | Ref |
| Permanent | Provisional | Named after | Date | Site | Discoverer(s) | Category | Diam. | Ref |
|---|---|---|---|---|---|---|---|---|
| 182901 | 2002 EG_{26} | — | March 10, 2002 | Anderson Mesa | LONEOS | · | 6.6 km | MPC · JPL |
| 182902 | 2002 EP_{39} | — | March 9, 2002 | Socorro | LINEAR | · | 3.7 km | MPC · JPL |
| 182903 | 2002 EM_{53} | — | March 13, 2002 | Socorro | LINEAR | · | 5.4 km | MPC · JPL |
| 182904 | 2002 EP_{60} | — | March 13, 2002 | Socorro | LINEAR | · | 3.9 km | MPC · JPL |
| 182905 | 2002 EG_{63} | — | March 13, 2002 | Socorro | LINEAR | PAD | 3.3 km | MPC · JPL |
| 182906 | 2002 EV_{68} | — | March 13, 2002 | Socorro | LINEAR | · | 4.7 km | MPC · JPL |
| 182907 | 2002 EG_{81} | — | March 13, 2002 | Palomar | NEAT | · | 3.2 km | MPC · JPL |
| 182908 | 2002 EH_{90} | — | March 12, 2002 | Socorro | LINEAR | · | 4.8 km | MPC · JPL |
| 182909 | 2002 ET_{90} | — | March 12, 2002 | Socorro | LINEAR | · | 1.1 km | MPC · JPL |
| 182910 | 2002 EP_{99} | — | March 2, 2002 | Uccle | Uccle | · | 4.2 km | MPC · JPL |
| 182911 | 2002 EO_{102} | — | March 6, 2002 | Palomar | NEAT | · | 3.7 km | MPC · JPL |
| 182912 | 2002 EE_{104} | — | March 9, 2002 | Anderson Mesa | LONEOS | LIX | 6.3 km | MPC · JPL |
| 182913 | 2002 EM_{106} | — | March 9, 2002 | Anderson Mesa | LONEOS | · | 5.7 km | MPC · JPL |
| 182914 | 2002 EL_{109} | — | March 9, 2002 | Kitt Peak | Spacewatch | · | 3.7 km | MPC · JPL |
| 182915 | 2002 EB_{113} | — | March 10, 2002 | Kitt Peak | Spacewatch | THM | 3.0 km | MPC · JPL |
| 182916 | 2002 EK_{117} | — | March 9, 2002 | Kitt Peak | Spacewatch | · | 4.0 km | MPC · JPL |
| 182917 | 2002 EX_{126} | — | March 12, 2002 | Anderson Mesa | LONEOS | · | 4.8 km | MPC · JPL |
| 182918 | 2002 EN_{132} | — | March 13, 2002 | Kitt Peak | Spacewatch | · | 3.8 km | MPC · JPL |
| 182919 | 2002 EM_{133} | — | March 13, 2002 | Socorro | LINEAR | · | 4.6 km | MPC · JPL |
| 182920 | 2002 EU_{134} | — | March 13, 2002 | Palomar | NEAT | · | 5.5 km | MPC · JPL |
| 182921 | 2002 ED_{140} | — | March 12, 2002 | Palomar | NEAT | EOS | 3.4 km | MPC · JPL |
| 182922 | 2002 EW_{154} | — | March 6, 2002 | Palomar | NEAT | THM | 2.9 km | MPC · JPL |
| 182923 | 2002 EK_{157} | — | March 13, 2002 | Palomar | NEAT | · | 4.5 km | MPC · JPL |
| 182924 | 2002 EN_{160} | — | March 12, 2002 | Palomar | NEAT | · | 4.0 km | MPC · JPL |
| 182925 Jevremović | 2002 EG_{161} | Jevremović | March 12, 2002 | Apache Point | SDSS | URS | 6.5 km | MPC · JPL |
| 182926 | 2002 FU_{6} | — | March 20, 2002 | Mauna Kea | B. Gladman, J. J. Kavelaars, A. Doressoundiram | cubewano (cold) | 117 km | MPC · JPL |
| 182927 | 2002 FN_{25} | — | March 19, 2002 | Palomar | NEAT | T_{j} (2.98) | 8.1 km | MPC · JPL |
| 182928 | 2002 FV_{26} | — | March 20, 2002 | Socorro | LINEAR | · | 5.5 km | MPC · JPL |
| 182929 | 2002 FJ_{32} | — | March 20, 2002 | Anderson Mesa | LONEOS | · | 4.5 km | MPC · JPL |
| 182930 | 2002 FX_{40} | — | March 21, 2002 | Socorro | LINEAR | LUT | 6.6 km | MPC · JPL |
| 182931 | 2002 GQ_{1} | — | April 4, 2002 | Haleakala | NEAT | T_{j} (2.99) · CYB | 8.7 km | MPC · JPL |
| 182932 | 2002 GQ_{2} | — | April 4, 2002 | Socorro | LINEAR | T_{j} (2.91) | 8.9 km | MPC · JPL |
| 182933 | 2002 GZ_{31} | — | April 6, 2002 | Cerro Tololo | M. W. Buie | SDO · moon | 193 km | MPC · JPL |
| 182934 | 2002 GJ_{32} | — | April 8, 2002 | Cerro Tololo | M. W. Buie | cubewano (hot) | 416 km | MPC · JPL |
| 182935 | 2002 GZ_{40} | — | April 4, 2002 | Palomar | NEAT | · | 6.5 km | MPC · JPL |
| 182936 | 2002 GC_{42} | — | April 4, 2002 | Haleakala | NEAT | · | 7.8 km | MPC · JPL |
| 182937 | 2002 GS_{47} | — | April 4, 2002 | Kitt Peak | Spacewatch | NYS | 1.4 km | MPC · JPL |
| 182938 | 2002 GK_{48} | — | April 4, 2002 | Palomar | NEAT | fast | 5.2 km | MPC · JPL |
| 182939 | 2002 GZ_{50} | — | April 5, 2002 | Anderson Mesa | LONEOS | HYG | 5.2 km | MPC · JPL |
| 182940 | 2002 GJ_{55} | — | April 5, 2002 | Palomar | NEAT | · | 6.4 km | MPC · JPL |
| 182941 | 2002 GE_{65} | — | April 8, 2002 | Palomar | NEAT | TIR | 4.6 km | MPC · JPL |
| 182942 | 2002 GM_{67} | — | April 8, 2002 | Palomar | NEAT | LUT | 7.8 km | MPC · JPL |
| 182943 | 2002 GG_{91} | — | April 9, 2002 | Kitt Peak | Spacewatch | · | 5.2 km | MPC · JPL |
| 182944 | 2002 GA_{100} | — | April 10, 2002 | Socorro | LINEAR | · | 2.5 km | MPC · JPL |
| 182945 | 2002 GC_{101} | — | April 10, 2002 | Socorro | LINEAR | · | 5.5 km | MPC · JPL |
| 182946 | 2002 GO_{106} | — | April 11, 2002 | Anderson Mesa | LONEOS | · | 6.0 km | MPC · JPL |
| 182947 | 2002 GJ_{110} | — | April 10, 2002 | Socorro | LINEAR | · | 6.4 km | MPC · JPL |
| 182948 | 2002 GJ_{123} | — | April 10, 2002 | Palomar | NEAT | · | 3.6 km | MPC · JPL |
| 182949 | 2002 GX_{155} | — | April 13, 2002 | Palomar | NEAT | VER | 5.7 km | MPC · JPL |
| 182950 | 2002 GL_{163} | — | April 14, 2002 | Kitt Peak | Spacewatch | · | 6.8 km | MPC · JPL |
| 182951 | 2002 GU_{177} | — | April 5, 2002 | Palomar | White, M., M. Collins | · | 3.9 km | MPC · JPL |
| 182952 | 2002 HH_{16} | — | April 18, 2002 | Kitt Peak | Spacewatch | THM | 3.5 km | MPC · JPL |
| 182953 | 2002 HN_{17} | — | April 21, 2002 | Socorro | LINEAR | T_{j} (2.98) · EUP | 8.0 km | MPC · JPL |
| 182954 | 2002 JH_{1} | — | May 3, 2002 | Kitt Peak | Spacewatch | CYB | 7.2 km | MPC · JPL |
| 182955 | 2002 JO_{10} | — | May 6, 2002 | Socorro | LINEAR | T_{j} (2.99) · EUP | 9.1 km | MPC · JPL |
| 182956 | 2002 JK_{16} | — | May 8, 2002 | Socorro | LINEAR | · | 1.5 km | MPC · JPL |
| 182957 | 2002 JK_{60} | — | May 10, 2002 | Socorro | LINEAR | · | 960 m | MPC · JPL |
| 182958 | 2002 JH_{62} | — | May 8, 2002 | Socorro | LINEAR | (2076) | 1.3 km | MPC · JPL |
| 182959 | 2002 JK_{68} | — | May 11, 2002 | Socorro | LINEAR | · | 1.4 km | MPC · JPL |
| 182960 | 2002 JT_{68} | — | May 6, 2002 | Socorro | LINEAR | · | 6.6 km | MPC · JPL |
| 182961 | 2002 JU_{116} | — | May 4, 2002 | Palomar | NEAT | · | 8.4 km | MPC · JPL |
| 182962 | 2002 JV_{118} | — | May 5, 2002 | Palomar | NEAT | · | 6.0 km | MPC · JPL |
| 182963 | 2002 JF_{122} | — | May 6, 2002 | Anderson Mesa | LONEOS | · | 1.1 km | MPC · JPL |
| 182964 | 2002 JE_{138} | — | May 9, 2002 | Palomar | NEAT | · | 710 m | MPC · JPL |
| 182965 | 2002 KX_{8} | — | May 29, 2002 | Haleakala | NEAT | · | 930 m | MPC · JPL |
| 182966 | 2002 LC_{4} | — | June 5, 2002 | Socorro | LINEAR | · | 2.0 km | MPC · JPL |
| 182967 | 2002 LK_{22} | — | June 8, 2002 | Socorro | LINEAR | · | 1.2 km | MPC · JPL |
| 182968 | 2002 LN_{29} | — | June 7, 2002 | Palomar | NEAT | · | 2.0 km | MPC · JPL |
| 182969 | 2002 MA_{5} | — | June 29, 2002 | Palomar | NEAT | V | 990 m | MPC · JPL |
| 182970 | 2002 NN_{15} | — | July 5, 2002 | Socorro | LINEAR | · | 1.1 km | MPC · JPL |
| 182971 | 2002 NQ_{15} | — | July 5, 2002 | Socorro | LINEAR | · | 1.1 km | MPC · JPL |
| 182972 | 2002 NX_{21} | — | July 9, 2002 | Socorro | LINEAR | · | 1 km | MPC · JPL |
| 182973 | 2002 NL_{23} | — | July 9, 2002 | Socorro | LINEAR | · | 1.0 km | MPC · JPL |
| 182974 | 2002 NT_{23} | — | July 9, 2002 | Socorro | LINEAR | · | 2.1 km | MPC · JPL |
| 182975 | 2002 NE_{36} | — | July 9, 2002 | Socorro | LINEAR | · | 1.1 km | MPC · JPL |
| 182976 | 2002 NR_{37} | — | July 9, 2002 | Socorro | LINEAR | · | 1.9 km | MPC · JPL |
| 182977 | 2002 NU_{38} | — | July 14, 2002 | Socorro | LINEAR | · | 1.0 km | MPC · JPL |
| 182978 | 2002 NX_{39} | — | July 14, 2002 | Palomar | NEAT | · | 1.5 km | MPC · JPL |
| 182979 | 2002 NE_{42} | — | July 14, 2002 | Palomar | NEAT | EUN | 1.3 km | MPC · JPL |
| 182980 | 2002 NQ_{46} | — | July 13, 2002 | Haleakala | NEAT | · | 2.1 km | MPC · JPL |
| 182981 | 2002 NK_{51} | — | July 5, 2002 | Socorro | LINEAR | · | 1.4 km | MPC · JPL |
| 182982 | 2002 NG_{61} | — | July 6, 2002 | Palomar | NEAT | · | 1.6 km | MPC · JPL |
| 182983 | 2002 NO_{61} | — | July 5, 2002 | Palomar | NEAT | · | 1.1 km | MPC · JPL |
| 182984 | 2002 OV | — | July 17, 2002 | Socorro | LINEAR | · | 930 m | MPC · JPL |
| 182985 | 2002 OF_{1} | — | July 17, 2002 | Socorro | LINEAR | · | 1.3 km | MPC · JPL |
| 182986 | 2002 OR_{2} | — | July 17, 2002 | Socorro | LINEAR | · | 1.2 km | MPC · JPL |
| 182987 | 2002 OC_{8} | — | July 18, 2002 | Palomar | NEAT | GEF | 1.8 km | MPC · JPL |
| 182988 | 2002 OM_{8} | — | July 19, 2002 | Palomar | NEAT | · | 900 m | MPC · JPL |
| 182989 | 2002 OE_{13} | — | July 18, 2002 | Socorro | LINEAR | · | 1.5 km | MPC · JPL |
| 182990 | 2002 OJ_{17} | — | July 18, 2002 | Socorro | LINEAR | · | 1.0 km | MPC · JPL |
| 182991 | 2002 OK_{25} | — | July 30, 2002 | Haleakala | Lowe, A. | · | 880 m | MPC · JPL |
| 182992 | 2002 OM_{28} | — | July 16, 2002 | Palomar | NEAT | · | 1.9 km | MPC · JPL |
| 182993 | 2002 PC_{1} | — | August 4, 2002 | El Centro | W. K. Y. Yeung | · | 1.2 km | MPC · JPL |
| 182994 | 2002 PO_{11} | — | August 5, 2002 | Campo Imperatore | CINEOS | · | 770 m | MPC · JPL |
| 182995 | 2002 PH_{24} | — | August 6, 2002 | Palomar | NEAT | · | 610 m | MPC · JPL |
| 182996 | 2002 PB_{28} | — | August 6, 2002 | Palomar | NEAT | · | 1.1 km | MPC · JPL |
| 182997 | 2002 PY_{29} | — | August 6, 2002 | Palomar | NEAT | · | 1.2 km | MPC · JPL |
| 182998 | 2002 PW_{34} | — | August 5, 2002 | Campo Imperatore | CINEOS | · | 960 m | MPC · JPL |
| 182999 | 2002 PJ_{37} | — | August 5, 2002 | Socorro | LINEAR | · | 1.3 km | MPC · JPL |
| 183000 | 2002 PR_{46} | — | August 9, 2002 | Socorro | LINEAR | · | 2.4 km | MPC · JPL |

back to top

== See also ==
- Meanings of minor-planet names: 182001–183000
