= Meanings of minor-planet names: 182001–183000 =

As minor planet discoveries are confirmed, they are given a permanent number by the IAU's Minor Planet Center (MPC), and the discoverers can then submit names for them, following the IAU's naming conventions. The list below concerns those minor planets in the specified number-range that have received names, and explains the meanings of those names.

Official naming citations of newly named small Solar System bodies are approved and published in a bulletin by IAU's Working Group for Small Bodies Nomenclature (WGSBN). Before May 2021, citations were published in MPC's Minor Planet Circulars for many decades. Recent citations can also be found on the JPL Small-Body Database (SBDB). Until his death in 2016, German astronomer Lutz D. Schmadel compiled these citations into the Dictionary of Minor Planet Names (DMP) and regularly updated the collection.

Based on Paul Herget's The Names of the Minor Planets, Schmadel also researched the unclear origin of numerous asteroids, most of which had been named prior to World War II. This article incorporates text from this source, which is in the public domain: SBDB New namings may only be added to this list below after official publication as the preannouncement of names is condemned. The WGSBN publishes a comprehensive guideline for the naming rules of non-cometary small Solar System bodies.

== 182001–182100 ==
Named minor planet	Provisional	This minor planet was named for...	Ref · Catalog
182044 Ryschkewitsch	2000 CV_{109}	Michael Ryschkewitsch (born 1951) of the Johns Hopkins University Applied Physics Laboratory (APL), served as the NASA Headquarters Chief Engineer and then as the Head of the APL Space Department for the New Horizons mission to Pluto.	JPL · 182044

== 182101–182200 ==
back to top

Named minor planet	Provisional	This minor planet was named for...	Ref · Catalog
182122 Sepan	2000 QY_{234}	Rebecca L. H. Sepan (born 1977), a senior mission operations analyst at the Johns Hopkins University Applied Physics Laboratory, served as a Flight Controller for the New Horizons mission to Pluto.	JPL · 182122

== 182201–182300 ==
back to top

Named minor planet	Provisional	This minor planet was named for...	Ref · Catalog
182262 Solène	2001 HA	Soléne Delavier (born 1996), the daughter of Anne-Véronique, wife of astronomer Michel Hernandez, one of the observers at the Observatory of Saint-Veran in France, where this minor planet was discovered.	JPL · 182262

== 182301–182400 ==
back to top

Named minor planet	Provisional	This minor planet was named for...	Ref · Catalog
There are no named minor planets in this number range

== 182401–182500 ==
back to top

Named minor planet	Provisional	This minor planet was named for...	Ref · Catalog
There are no named minor planets in this number range

== 182501–182600 ==
back to top

Named minor planet	Provisional	This minor planet was named for...	Ref · Catalog
182590 Vladisvujnovic	2001 TA_{245}	Vladis Vujnovic (born 1933) is a professor of astronomy and physics at the University of Zagreb, a pianist, author of numerous astronomy textbooks and other publications, and a major contributor to the development of astronomy and astrophysics in Croatia.	IAU · 182590
182591 Mocescobedo	2001 TG_{247}	Cuauhtemoc Escobedo (born 1962), an American jazz music educator from Seattle, Washington, who received the 2006 Golden Apple Award and admitted to the Seattle Jazz Hall of Fame.	IAU · 182591
182592 Jolana	2001 TF_{257}	Jolana Kürtiova (born 1963), wife of Slovak amateur astronomer Stefan Kürti, who was involved with the discovery and early astrometric measurements of this minor planet	JPL · 182592

== 182601–182700 ==
back to top

Named minor planet	Provisional	This minor planet was named for...	Ref · Catalog
182674 Hanslmeier	2001 UB_{225}	Arnold Hanslmeier (b. 1959), a professor of astrophysics at the University of Graz.	IAU · 182674

== 182701–182800 ==
back to top

Named minor planet	Provisional	This minor planet was named for...	Ref · Catalog
182730 Muminovic	2001 WX_{103}	Muhamed Muminović (b. 1948), an astronomer, educator and the most prolific author of astronomical literature in Bosnia and Herzegovina.	IAU · 182730
182786 Dankobosanac	2001 YU_{158}	Danko S. Bosanac, renowned Croatian physicist and a major contributor to the popularization of astronomy and astronautics in Croatia.	IAU · 182786

== 182801–182900 ==
back to top

Named minor planet	Provisional	This minor planet was named for...	Ref · Catalog
There are no named minor planets in this number range

== 182901–183000 ==
back to top

Named minor planet	Provisional	This minor planet was named for...	Ref · Catalog
182925 Jevremović	2002 EG_{161}	Darko Jevremović, renowned Serbian astrophysicist and a major contributor to the popularization of astronomy in Serbia.	IAU · 182925

back to top

Preceded by 181,001–182,000	Meanings of minor-planet names List of minor planets: 182,001–183,000	Succeeded by 183,001–184,000
