= (182294) 2001 KU76 =

Trans-Neptunian object

(182294) 2001 KU_{76}
Discovery
- Discovered by: Buie, M. W.
- Discovery date: 24 May 2001

Designations
- Minor planet category: Trans-Neptunian object 6:11 resonance?

Orbital characteristics
- Epoch 13 January 2016 (JD 2457400.5)
- Uncertainty parameter 4
- Observation arc: 2536 days (6.94 yr)
- Aphelion: 52.656 AU (7.8772 Tm) (Q)
- Perihelion: 37.693 AU (5.6388 Tm) (q)
- Semi-major axis: 45.175 AU (6.7581 Tm) (a)
- Eccentricity: 0.16561 (e)
- Orbital period (sidereal): 303.63 yr (110903 d)
- Mean anomaly: 354.46° (M)
- Mean motion: 0° 0^{m} 11.686^{s} / day (n)
- Inclination: 10.637° (i)
- Longitude of ascending node: 44.987° (Ω)
- Time of perihelion: ≈ 6 December 2021 ±3 months
- Argument of perihelion: 204.39° (ω)
- Earth MOID: 36.6816 AU (5.48749 Tm)
- Jupiter MOID: 32.3615 AU (4.84121 Tm)

Physical characteristics
- Dimensions: 211 km (assumed)
- Geometric albedo: 0.09 (assumed)
- Absolute magnitude (H): 6.6

(182294) 2001 KU_{76} is a trans-Neptunian object (TNO) that has a possible 6:11 resonance with Neptune.

Assuming a generic TNO albedo of 0.09, it is about 211 km in diameter.

== Resonance ==
Simulations by Lykawka in 2007 show that 2001 KU_{76} may be librating in the 6:11 resonance with Neptune. Marc Buie classifies it as probably in resonance, although some possible orbits do not librate. 2001 KU_{76} has a semi-major axis of 45 AU and an orbital period of about 302 years.

It has been observed 29 times over 6 years and has an orbit quality code of 4.

The libration of 2001 KU_{76}'s nominal orbit. Neptune is the white (stationary) dot at 5 o'clock. Uranus is blue, Saturn yellow, and Jupiter red.
