= List of minor planets: 27001–28000 =

The following is a partial list of minor planets, running from minor-planet number 27001 through 28000, inclusive. The primary data for this and other partial lists is based on JPL's "Small-Body Orbital Elements" and data available from the Minor Planet Center. Critical list information is also provided by the MPC, unless otherwise specified from Lowell Observatory. A detailed description of the table's columns and additional sources are given on the main page including a complete list of every page in this series, and a statistical break-up on the dynamical classification of minor planets.

Also see the summary list of all named bodies in numerical and alphabetical order, and the corresponding naming citations for the number range of this particular list. New namings may only be added to this list after official publication, as the preannouncement of names is condemned by the Working Group for Small Bodies Nomenclature of the International Astronomical Union.

Near-Earth obj.	MBA (inner)	MBA (outer)	Centaur
Mars-crosser	MBA (middle)	Jupiter trojan	Trans-Neptunian obj.
Unclassified

== 27001–27100 ==
Designation			Discovery			Properties		Ref
Permanent	Provisional	Named after	Date	Site	Discoverer(s)	Category	Diam.	Ref
27001	1998 DC_{6}	—	February 22, 1998	Haleakala	NEAT	(3460)	13 km	MPC · JPL
27002	1998 DV_{9}	—	February 23, 1998	Mauna Kea	D. J. Tholen, Whiteley, R. J.	APO · PHA	770 m	MPC · JPL
27003 Katoizumi	1998 DB_{13}	Katoizumi	February 21, 1998	Kuma Kogen	A. Nakamura	·	5.2 km	MPC · JPL
27004 Violetaparra	1998 DP_{23}	Violetaparra	February 27, 1998	Caussols	ODAS	EOS	6.7 km	MPC · JPL
27005 Dariaguidetti	1998 DR_{35}	Dariaguidetti	February 27, 1998	Cima Ekar	G. Forti, M. Tombelli	slow?	6.2 km	MPC · JPL
27006	1998 EX_{7}	—	March 2, 1998	Xinglong	SCAP	·	2.2 km	MPC · JPL
27007	1998 FQ_{1}	—	March 21, 1998	Kitt Peak	Spacewatch	NYS	3.3 km	MPC · JPL
27008	1998 FW_{2}	—	March 20, 1998	USNO Flagstaff	Luginbuhl, C. B.	·	6.1 km	MPC · JPL
27009	1998 FB_{11}	—	March 25, 1998	Caussols	ODAS	·	3.7 km	MPC · JPL
27010	1998 FR_{13}	—	March 26, 1998	Haleakala	NEAT	EOS	8.1 km	MPC · JPL
27011	1998 FU_{22}	—	March 20, 1998	Socorro	LINEAR	·	3.0 km	MPC · JPL
27012	1998 FZ_{46}	—	March 20, 1998	Socorro	LINEAR	·	2.3 km	MPC · JPL
27013	1998 FU_{60}	—	March 20, 1998	Socorro	LINEAR	·	6.6 km	MPC · JPL
27014	1998 FP_{106}	—	March 31, 1998	Socorro	LINEAR	·	3.0 km	MPC · JPL
27015	1998 HS_{135}	—	April 19, 1998	Socorro	LINEAR	·	4.0 km	MPC · JPL
27016	1998 HK_{143}	—	April 21, 1998	Socorro	LINEAR	V	3.3 km	MPC · JPL
27017	1998 JX	—	May 1, 1998	Haleakala	NEAT	·	2.4 km	MPC · JPL
27018	1998 KQ_{52}	—	May 23, 1998	Socorro	LINEAR	·	2.4 km	MPC · JPL
27019	1998 MN_{33}	—	June 24, 1998	Socorro	LINEAR	EOS	7.9 km	MPC · JPL
27020	1998 OQ_{10}	—	July 26, 1998	La Silla	E. W. Elst	slow	3.2 km	MPC · JPL
27021	1998 OQ_{14}	—	July 26, 1998	La Silla	E. W. Elst	·	2.7 km	MPC · JPL
27022	1998 QA_{44}	—	August 17, 1998	Socorro	LINEAR	·	2.0 km	MPC · JPL
27023 Juuliamoreau	1998 QE_{54}	Juuliamoreau	August 20, 1998	Anderson Mesa	LONEOS	·	4.3 km	MPC · JPL
27024	1998 QL_{57}	—	August 30, 1998	Kitt Peak	Spacewatch	slow	2.4 km	MPC · JPL
27025	1998 QY_{77}	—	August 24, 1998	Socorro	LINEAR	V	2.0 km	MPC · JPL
27026	1998 QG_{86}	—	August 24, 1998	Socorro	LINEAR	·	10 km	MPC · JPL
27027	1998 QA_{98}	—	August 28, 1998	Socorro	LINEAR	·	7.4 km	MPC · JPL
27028	1998 QS_{98}	—	August 28, 1998	Socorro	LINEAR	·	3.7 km	MPC · JPL
27029	1998 QP_{105}	—	August 25, 1998	La Silla	E. W. Elst	·	2.4 km	MPC · JPL
27030	1998 QW_{105}	—	August 25, 1998	La Silla	E. W. Elst	·	3.5 km	MPC · JPL
27031	1998 RO_{4}	—	September 14, 1998	Socorro	LINEAR	AMO +1km	940 m	MPC · JPL
27032 Veazey	1998 RQ_{5}	Veazey	September 15, 1998	Anderson Mesa	LONEOS	·	2.1 km	MPC · JPL
27033	1998 RN_{33}	—	September 14, 1998	Socorro	LINEAR	·	2.7 km	MPC · JPL
27034	1998 RL_{34}	—	September 14, 1998	Socorro	LINEAR	·	2.4 km	MPC · JPL
27035	1998 RM_{34}	—	September 14, 1998	Socorro	LINEAR	·	2.4 km	MPC · JPL
27036	1998 RZ_{54}	—	September 14, 1998	Socorro	LINEAR	·	2.5 km	MPC · JPL
27037	1998 RB_{55}	—	September 14, 1998	Socorro	LINEAR	·	2.8 km	MPC · JPL
27038	1998 RZ_{57}	—	September 14, 1998	Socorro	LINEAR	·	2.9 km	MPC · JPL
27039	1998 RU_{61}	—	September 14, 1998	Socorro	LINEAR	·	2.8 km	MPC · JPL
27040	1998 RD_{62}	—	September 14, 1998	Socorro	LINEAR	·	4.0 km	MPC · JPL
27041	1998 RN_{63}	—	September 14, 1998	Socorro	LINEAR	·	2.0 km	MPC · JPL
27042	1998 RD_{69}	—	September 14, 1998	Socorro	LINEAR	·	1.9 km	MPC · JPL
27043	1998 RS_{71}	—	September 14, 1998	Socorro	LINEAR	·	3.0 km	MPC · JPL
27044	1998 RP_{74}	—	September 14, 1998	Socorro	LINEAR	·	2.8 km	MPC · JPL
27045	1998 RY_{74}	—	September 14, 1998	Socorro	LINEAR	·	1.7 km	MPC · JPL
27046	1998 RP_{75}	—	September 14, 1998	Socorro	LINEAR	·	2.8 km	MPC · JPL
27047 Boisvert	1998 RA_{80}	Boisvert	September 14, 1998	Socorro	LINEAR	·	2.3 km	MPC · JPL
27048 Jangong	1998 RO_{80}	Jangong	September 14, 1998	Socorro	LINEAR	·	3.2 km	MPC · JPL
27049 Kraus	1998 SB_{3}	Kraus	September 18, 1998	Goodricke-Pigott	R. A. Tucker	·	10 km	MPC · JPL
27050 Beresheet	1998 SW_{4}	Beresheet	September 17, 1998	Anderson Mesa	LONEOS	·	2.6 km	MPC · JPL
27051	1998 SM_{5}	—	September 16, 1998	Kitt Peak	Spacewatch	·	3.6 km	MPC · JPL
27052 Katebush	1998 SN_{13}	Katebush	September 21, 1998	Caussols	ODAS	·	4.0 km	MPC · JPL
27053	1998 SU_{21}	—	September 17, 1998	Višnjan Observatory	Višnjan	·	1.9 km	MPC · JPL
27054 Williamgoddard	1998 SA_{25}	Williamgoddard	September 18, 1998	Anderson Mesa	LONEOS	·	3.5 km	MPC · JPL
27055	1998 SQ_{27}	—	September 24, 1998	Catalina	CSS	HNS	3.1 km	MPC · JPL
27056 Ginoloria	1998 SB_{28}	Ginoloria	September 26, 1998	Prescott	P. G. Comba	EOS	6.6 km	MPC · JPL
27057	1998 SP_{33}	—	September 26, 1998	Socorro	LINEAR	·	2.7 km	MPC · JPL
27058	1998 SP_{37}	—	September 21, 1998	Kitt Peak	Spacewatch	·	3.1 km	MPC · JPL
27059	1998 SS_{37}	—	September 21, 1998	Kitt Peak	Spacewatch	·	1.9 km	MPC · JPL
27060	1998 SU_{37}	—	September 21, 1998	Kitt Peak	Spacewatch	·	3.5 km	MPC · JPL
27061 Wong	1998 SW_{53}	Wong	September 16, 1998	Anderson Mesa	LONEOS	·	3.2 km	MPC · JPL
27062 Brookeminer	1998 SJ_{58}	Brookeminer	September 17, 1998	Anderson Mesa	LONEOS	MAS	3.4 km	MPC · JPL
27063 Richardmontano	1998 SY_{60}	Richardmontano	September 17, 1998	Anderson Mesa	LONEOS	·	1.9 km	MPC · JPL
27064	1998 SY_{63}	—	September 20, 1998	La Silla	E. W. Elst	·	5.8 km	MPC · JPL
27065	1998 SJ_{64}	—	September 20, 1998	La Silla	E. W. Elst	·	4.3 km	MPC · JPL
27066	1998 SZ_{64}	—	September 20, 1998	La Silla	E. W. Elst	·	3.9 km	MPC · JPL
27067	1998 SS_{67}	—	September 20, 1998	La Silla	E. W. Elst	·	2.6 km	MPC · JPL
27068	1998 SU_{74}	—	September 21, 1998	La Silla	E. W. Elst	·	6.1 km	MPC · JPL
27069	1998 SK_{75}	—	September 21, 1998	La Silla	E. W. Elst	·	4.9 km	MPC · JPL
27070	1998 SA_{101}	—	September 26, 1998	Socorro	LINEAR	·	3.0 km	MPC · JPL
27071 Rangwala	1998 SA_{109}	Rangwala	September 26, 1998	Socorro	LINEAR	·	2.5 km	MPC · JPL
27072 Aggarwal	1998 SS_{117}	Aggarwal	September 26, 1998	Socorro	LINEAR	·	7.6 km	MPC · JPL
27073	1998 SK_{132}	—	September 26, 1998	Socorro	LINEAR	·	3.8 km	MPC · JPL
27074 Etatolia	1998 SS_{132}	Etatolia	September 26, 1998	Socorro	LINEAR	·	4.1 km	MPC · JPL
27075	1998 SY_{143}	—	September 18, 1998	La Silla	E. W. Elst	·	2.3 km	MPC · JPL
27076	1998 ST_{146}	—	September 20, 1998	La Silla	E. W. Elst	·	3.2 km	MPC · JPL
27077	1998 TL_{2}	—	October 13, 1998	Caussols	ODAS	·	2.0 km	MPC · JPL
27078	1998 TC_{6}	—	October 15, 1998	Višnjan Observatory	K. Korlević	·	3.0 km	MPC · JPL
27079 Vsetín	1998 TO_{6}	Vsetín	October 15, 1998	Ondřejov	P. Pravec	·	2.4 km	MPC · JPL
27080	1998 TH_{16}	—	October 14, 1998	Višnjan Observatory	K. Korlević	·	4.0 km	MPC · JPL
27081	1998 TK_{16}	—	October 15, 1998	Višnjan Observatory	K. Korlević	V	2.1 km	MPC · JPL
27082 Donaldson-Hanna	1998 TT_{30}	Donaldson-Hanna	October 10, 1998	Anderson Mesa	LONEOS	·	3.5 km	MPC · JPL
27083 Alethialittle	1998 TG_{32}	Alethialittle	October 11, 1998	Anderson Mesa	LONEOS	·	2.1 km	MPC · JPL
27084 Heidilarson	1998 TD_{33}	Heidilarson	October 14, 1998	Anderson Mesa	LONEOS	·	1.6 km	MPC · JPL
27085	1998 UA_{1}	—	October 19, 1998	Zeno	T. Stafford	·	3.6 km	MPC · JPL
27086 Italicobrass	1998 UX_{6}	Italicobrass	October 20, 1998	Farra d'Isonzo	Farra d'Isonzo	·	1.8 km	MPC · JPL
27087 Tillmannmohr	1998 UA_{15}	Tillmannmohr	October 24, 1998	Kleť	J. Tichá, M. Tichý	·	3.6 km	MPC · JPL
27088 Valmez	1998 UC_{15}	Valmez	October 22, 1998	Ondřejov	P. Pravec	·	3.7 km	MPC · JPL
27089	1998 UE_{15}	—	October 23, 1998	Višnjan Observatory	K. Korlević	·	2.1 km	MPC · JPL
27090	1998 UP_{18}	—	October 25, 1998	Oizumi	T. Kobayashi	·	3.2 km	MPC · JPL
27091 Alisonbick	1998 UY_{21}	Alisonbick	October 28, 1998	Socorro	LINEAR	·	4.2 km	MPC · JPL
27092	1998 UY_{22}	—	October 30, 1998	Višnjan Observatory	K. Korlević	·	1.9 km	MPC · JPL
27093	1998 UB_{23}	—	October 30, 1998	Višnjan Observatory	K. Korlević	·	2.7 km	MPC · JPL
27094 Salgari	1998 UC_{23}	Salgari	October 25, 1998	Cima Ekar	U. Munari, Castellani, F.	V	3.2 km	MPC · JPL
27095 Girardiwanda	1998 UE_{23}	Girardiwanda	October 25, 1998	Cima Ekar	U. Munari, Castellani, F.	·	2.5 km	MPC · JPL
27096 Jelenalane	1998 UL_{24}	Jelenalane	October 18, 1998	Anderson Mesa	LONEOS	·	2.3 km	MPC · JPL
27097	1998 UM_{26}	—	October 18, 1998	La Silla	E. W. Elst	·	3.2 km	MPC · JPL
27098 Bocarsly	1998 UC_{41}	Bocarsly	October 28, 1998	Socorro	LINEAR	·	5.3 km	MPC · JPL
27099 Xiaoyucao	1998 UJ_{43}	Xiaoyucao	October 28, 1998	Socorro	LINEAR	·	4.4 km	MPC · JPL
27100	1998 VV_{6}	—	November 12, 1998	Oizumi	T. Kobayashi	·	2.4 km	MPC · JPL

== 27101–27200 ==
back to top

Designation			Discovery			Properties		Ref
Permanent	Provisional	Named after	Date	Site	Discoverer(s)	Category	Diam.	Ref
27101 Wenyucao	1998 VK_{7}	Wenyucao	November 10, 1998	Socorro	LINEAR	·	2.4 km	MPC · JPL
27102 Emilychen	1998 VV_{7}	Emilychen	November 10, 1998	Socorro	LINEAR	·	3.5 km	MPC · JPL
27103 Sungwoncho	1998 VB_{15}	Sungwoncho	November 10, 1998	Socorro	LINEAR	·	1.6 km	MPC · JPL
27104	1998 VH_{18}	—	November 10, 1998	Socorro	LINEAR	·	3.6 km	MPC · JPL
27105 Clarkben	1998 VB_{20}	Clarkben	November 10, 1998	Socorro	LINEAR	·	3.6 km	MPC · JPL
27106 Jongoldman	1998 VV_{29}	Jongoldman	November 10, 1998	Socorro	LINEAR	V	2.7 km	MPC · JPL
27107 Michelleabi	1998 VB_{30}	Michelleabi	November 10, 1998	Socorro	LINEAR	·	3.8 km	MPC · JPL
27108 Bryanhe	1998 VM_{30}	Bryanhe	November 10, 1998	Socorro	LINEAR	·	3.9 km	MPC · JPL
27109	1998 VV_{32}	—	November 15, 1998	Catalina	CSS	·	20 km	MPC · JPL
27110 Annemaryvonne	1998 VX_{33}	Annemaryvonne	November 11, 1998	Caussols	ODAS	·	1.9 km	MPC · JPL
27111	1998 VV_{34}	—	November 12, 1998	Kushiro	S. Ueda, H. Kaneda	·	5.3 km	MPC · JPL
27112	1998 VC_{35}	—	November 12, 1998	Kushiro	S. Ueda, H. Kaneda	·	8.8 km	MPC · JPL
27113	1998 VY_{54}	—	November 14, 1998	Socorro	LINEAR	·	2.8 km	MPC · JPL
27114 Lukasiewicz	1998 WG_{2}	Lukasiewicz	November 19, 1998	Prescott	P. G. Comba	THM	6.1 km	MPC · JPL
27115	1998 WG_{3}	—	November 19, 1998	Oizumi	T. Kobayashi	fast	8.9 km	MPC · JPL
27116	1998 WL_{3}	—	November 19, 1998	Oizumi	T. Kobayashi	GEF	3.7 km	MPC · JPL
27117	1998 WQ_{3}	—	November 19, 1998	Oizumi	T. Kobayashi	EUN	6.3 km	MPC · JPL
27118	1998 WD_{8}	—	November 25, 1998	Oizumi	T. Kobayashi	PAD	7.8 km	MPC · JPL
27119	1998 WH_{8}	—	November 25, 1998	Oizumi	T. Kobayashi	·	4.1 km	MPC · JPL
27120 Isabelhawkins	1998 WV_{8}	Isabelhawkins	November 28, 1998	Cocoa	I. P. Griffin	MAS	2.7 km	MPC · JPL
27121 Joardar	1998 WV_{10}	Joardar	November 21, 1998	Socorro	LINEAR	·	2.7 km	MPC · JPL
27122	1998 WY_{13}	—	November 21, 1998	Socorro	LINEAR	·	3.2 km	MPC · JPL
27123 Matthewlam	1998 WM_{14}	Matthewlam	November 21, 1998	Socorro	LINEAR	·	2.2 km	MPC · JPL
27124	1998 WA_{20}	—	November 29, 1998	Woomera	F. B. Zoltowski	EOS	9.3 km	MPC · JPL
27125 Siyilee	1998 WZ_{20}	Siyilee	November 18, 1998	Socorro	LINEAR	·	2.2 km	MPC · JPL
27126 Bonnielei	1998 WG_{23}	Bonnielei	November 18, 1998	Socorro	LINEAR	·	4.9 km	MPC · JPL
27127	1998 WB_{24}	—	November 25, 1998	Socorro	LINEAR	GEF	4.3 km	MPC · JPL
27128	1998 WB_{25}	—	November 28, 1998	Xinglong	SCAP	EUN	6.3 km	MPC · JPL
27129	1998 XN_{1}	—	December 7, 1998	Caussols	ODAS	·	7.9 km	MPC · JPL
27130 Dipaola	1998 XA_{3}	Dipaola	December 8, 1998	San Marcello	A. Boattini, M. Tombelli	·	4.8 km	MPC · JPL
27131	1998 XU_{3}	—	December 9, 1998	Oizumi	T. Kobayashi	·	2.7 km	MPC · JPL
27132 Ježek	1998 XJ_{9}	Ježek	December 11, 1998	Ondřejov	P. Pravec, L. Kotková	V	2.1 km	MPC · JPL
27133	1998 XQ_{9}	—	December 14, 1998	Višnjan Observatory	K. Korlević	·	2.4 km	MPC · JPL
27134	1998 XO_{11}	—	December 13, 1998	Oizumi	T. Kobayashi	KOR	5.2 km	MPC · JPL
27135	1998 XB_{12}	—	December 15, 1998	Socorro	LINEAR	PHO	5.3 km	MPC · JPL
27136	1998 XJ_{16}	—	December 14, 1998	Socorro	LINEAR	PHO	6.8 km	MPC · JPL
27137	1998 XP_{27}	—	December 14, 1998	Socorro	LINEAR	V	3.5 km	MPC · JPL
27138	1998 XU_{42}	—	December 14, 1998	Socorro	LINEAR	·	3.5 km	MPC · JPL
27139	1998 XX_{46}	—	December 14, 1998	Socorro	LINEAR	EUN	7.9 km	MPC · JPL
27140	1998 XW_{49}	—	December 14, 1998	Socorro	LINEAR	GEF	5.7 km	MPC · JPL
27141 Krystleleung	1998 XT_{52}	Krystleleung	December 14, 1998	Socorro	LINEAR	V	3.2 km	MPC · JPL
27142	1998 XG_{61}	—	December 13, 1998	Kitt Peak	Spacewatch	·	12 km	MPC · JPL
27143	1998 XK_{63}	—	December 14, 1998	Socorro	LINEAR	·	2.7 km	MPC · JPL
27144	1998 XN_{74}	—	December 14, 1998	Socorro	LINEAR	·	11 km	MPC · JPL
27145	1998 XC_{94}	—	December 15, 1998	Socorro	LINEAR	·	3.7 km	MPC · JPL
27146	1998 YL_{1}	—	December 16, 1998	Socorro	LINEAR	EUN	7.4 km	MPC · JPL
27147 Mercedessosa	1998 YE_{2}	Mercedessosa	December 17, 1998	Caussols	ODAS	EOS	5.1 km	MPC · JPL
27148	1998 YT_{2}	—	December 17, 1998	Caussols	ODAS	EOS	8.7 km	MPC · JPL
27149	1998 YN_{3}	—	December 17, 1998	Oizumi	T. Kobayashi	·	5.3 km	MPC · JPL
27150 Annasante	1998 YQ_{3}	Annasante	December 16, 1998	Bologna	San Vittore	·	9.1 km	MPC · JPL
27151	1998 YT_{3}	—	December 17, 1998	Višnjan Observatory	K. Korlević	KOR	7.3 km	MPC · JPL
27152	1998 YN_{5}	—	December 21, 1998	Oizumi	T. Kobayashi	EUN	4.1 km	MPC · JPL
27153	1998 YO_{5}	—	December 21, 1998	Oizumi	T. Kobayashi	MAR	7.6 km	MPC · JPL
27154	1998 YG_{7}	—	December 22, 1998	Oizumi	T. Kobayashi	EOS	7.5 km	MPC · JPL
27155	1998 YM_{16}	—	December 22, 1998	Kitt Peak	Spacewatch	THM	9.0 km	MPC · JPL
27156	1998 YK_{22}	—	December 21, 1998	Xinglong	SCAP	·	2.9 km	MPC · JPL
27157	1998 YK_{27}	—	December 25, 1998	Višnjan Observatory	K. Korlević	HYG	7.9 km	MPC · JPL
27158 Benedetti-Rossi	1998 YZ_{29}	Benedetti-Rossi	December 27, 1998	Anderson Mesa	LONEOS	EOS	8.3 km	MPC · JPL
27159	1999 AA_{2}	—	January 6, 1999	Višnjan Observatory	K. Korlević	·	3.8 km	MPC · JPL
27160	1999 AQ_{4}	—	January 11, 1999	Oizumi	T. Kobayashi	EOS	7.7 km	MPC · JPL
27161	1999 AR_{4}	—	January 11, 1999	Oizumi	T. Kobayashi	·	6.0 km	MPC · JPL
27162	1999 AM_{6}	—	January 8, 1999	Socorro	LINEAR	·	4.8 km	MPC · JPL
27163	1999 AA_{7}	—	January 9, 1999	Višnjan Observatory	K. Korlević	NYS	2.8 km	MPC · JPL
27164	1999 AH_{7}	—	January 9, 1999	Višnjan Observatory	K. Korlević	·	4.0 km	MPC · JPL
27165	1999 AM_{7}	—	January 10, 1999	Višnjan Observatory	K. Korlević	EOS	6.9 km	MPC · JPL
27166	1999 AN_{20}	—	January 12, 1999	Woomera	F. B. Zoltowski	·	2.2 km	MPC · JPL
27167	1999 AH_{21}	—	January 14, 1999	Višnjan Observatory	K. Korlević	·	7.0 km	MPC · JPL
27168	1999 AN_{21}	—	January 14, 1999	Višnjan Observatory	K. Korlević	WIT	3.4 km	MPC · JPL
27169 Annelabruzzo	1999 AS_{23}	Annelabruzzo	January 14, 1999	Anderson Mesa	LONEOS	EOS	8.2 km	MPC · JPL
27170	1999 AN_{30}	—	January 14, 1999	Kitt Peak	Spacewatch	NYS	2.2 km	MPC · JPL
27171	1999 AD_{33}	—	January 15, 1999	Kitt Peak	Spacewatch	EOS	6.9 km	MPC · JPL
27172 Brucekosaveach	1999 AN_{34}	Brucekosaveach	January 15, 1999	Anderson Mesa	LONEOS	·	5.8 km	MPC · JPL
27173	1999 BM_{1}	—	January 18, 1999	Kleť	Kleť	NYS	3.6 km	MPC · JPL
27174	1999 BB_{2}	—	January 19, 1999	Črni Vrh	J. Skvarč, B. Dintinjana	·	7.8 km	MPC · JPL
27175	1999 BS_{2}	—	January 18, 1999	Oizumi	T. Kobayashi	·	7.8 km	MPC · JPL
27176	1999 BR_{3}	—	January 19, 1999	Višnjan Observatory	K. Korlević	·	5.0 km	MPC · JPL
27177	1999 BU_{3}	—	January 19, 1999	Višnjan Observatory	K. Korlević	THM	12 km	MPC · JPL
27178 Quino	1999 BT_{6}	Quino	January 21, 1999	Caussols	ODAS	·	3.2 km	MPC · JPL
27179	1999 BJ_{10}	—	January 23, 1999	Višnjan Observatory	K. Korlević	·	5.6 km	MPC · JPL
27180	1999 CM_{1}	—	February 7, 1999	Oizumi	T. Kobayashi	KOR	5.3 km	MPC · JPL
27181	1999 CX_{1}	—	February 7, 1999	Oizumi	T. Kobayashi	·	8.3 km	MPC · JPL
27182 Korinotenmondai	1999 CL_{3}	Korinotenmondai	February 8, 1999	Kashihara	F. Uto	EOS	10 km	MPC · JPL
27183	1999 CF_{4}	—	February 10, 1999	Woomera	F. B. Zoltowski	·	7.3 km	MPC · JPL
27184 Ciabattari	1999 CX_{4}	Ciabattari	February 8, 1999	Monte Agliale	S. Donati	KOR	3.8 km	MPC · JPL
27185	1999 CH_{37}	—	February 10, 1999	Socorro	LINEAR	·	5.1 km	MPC · JPL
27186	1999 CA_{39}	—	February 10, 1999	Socorro	LINEAR	KOR	6.2 km	MPC · JPL
27187	1999 CQ_{40}	—	February 10, 1999	Socorro	LINEAR	EOS	6.0 km	MPC · JPL
27188	1999 CL_{46}	—	February 10, 1999	Socorro	LINEAR	·	5.7 km	MPC · JPL
27189	1999 CF_{51}	—	February 10, 1999	Socorro	LINEAR	CYB	16 km	MPC · JPL
27190	1999 CW_{51}	—	February 10, 1999	Socorro	LINEAR	EOS	7.7 km	MPC · JPL
27191	1999 CO_{54}	—	February 10, 1999	Socorro	LINEAR	TEL	5.6 km	MPC · JPL
27192 Selenali	1999 CR_{59}	Selenali	February 12, 1999	Socorro	LINEAR	·	5.0 km	MPC · JPL
27193	1999 CD_{60}	—	February 12, 1999	Socorro	LINEAR	·	4.7 km	MPC · JPL
27194 Jonathanli	1999 CF_{60}	Jonathanli	February 12, 1999	Socorro	LINEAR	·	4.5 km	MPC · JPL
27195	1999 CD_{61}	—	February 12, 1999	Socorro	LINEAR	HYG	12 km	MPC · JPL
27196	1999 CF_{64}	—	February 12, 1999	Socorro	LINEAR	·	11 km	MPC · JPL
27197 Andrewliu	1999 CW_{65}	Andrewliu	February 12, 1999	Socorro	LINEAR	KOR	4.0 km	MPC · JPL
27198	1999 CR_{66}	—	February 12, 1999	Socorro	LINEAR	EOS	5.6 km	MPC · JPL
27199	1999 CE_{67}	—	February 12, 1999	Socorro	LINEAR	EUN	5.1 km	MPC · JPL
27200	1999 CV_{69}	—	February 12, 1999	Socorro	LINEAR	PHO	3.2 km	MPC · JPL

== 27201–27300 ==
back to top

Designation			Discovery			Properties		Ref
Permanent	Provisional	Named after	Date	Site	Discoverer(s)	Category	Diam.	Ref
27201	1999 CR_{70}	—	February 12, 1999	Socorro	LINEAR	·	5.8 km	MPC · JPL
27202	1999 CU_{70}	—	February 12, 1999	Socorro	LINEAR	EOS	7.7 km	MPC · JPL
27203	1999 CR_{74}	—	February 12, 1999	Socorro	LINEAR	VER	9.3 km	MPC · JPL
27204	1999 CY_{74}	—	February 12, 1999	Socorro	LINEAR	EOS	7.2 km	MPC · JPL
27205	1999 CY_{75}	—	February 12, 1999	Socorro	LINEAR	·	6.1 km	MPC · JPL
27206	1999 CZ_{80}	—	February 12, 1999	Socorro	LINEAR	·	8.8 km	MPC · JPL
27207	1999 CD_{97}	—	February 10, 1999	Socorro	LINEAR	·	7.3 km	MPC · JPL
27208 Jennyliu	1999 CF_{104}	Jennyliu	February 12, 1999	Socorro	LINEAR	·	6.4 km	MPC · JPL
27209	1999 CN_{105}	—	February 12, 1999	Socorro	LINEAR	EOS	5.6 km	MPC · JPL
27210	1999 CZ_{105}	—	February 12, 1999	Socorro	LINEAR	·	4.3 km	MPC · JPL
27211	1999 CO_{106}	—	February 12, 1999	Socorro	LINEAR	·	5.2 km	MPC · JPL
27212	1999 CW_{106}	—	February 12, 1999	Socorro	LINEAR	·	4.2 km	MPC · JPL
27213	1999 CA_{110}	—	February 12, 1999	Socorro	LINEAR	EOS	5.8 km	MPC · JPL
27214	1999 CE_{117}	—	February 12, 1999	Socorro	LINEAR	·	5.6 km	MPC · JPL
27215	1999 CK_{128}	—	February 11, 1999	Socorro	LINEAR	·	4.4 km	MPC · JPL
27216	1999 CV_{136}	—	February 9, 1999	Kitt Peak	Spacewatch	·	3.7 km	MPC · JPL
27217 Mattieharrington	1999 CC_{154}	Mattieharrington	February 14, 1999	Anderson Mesa	LONEOS	·	6.7 km	MPC · JPL
27218	1999 DS_{1}	—	February 18, 1999	Haleakala	NEAT	KOR	5.3 km	MPC · JPL
27219	1999 EL	—	March 9, 1999	Zeno	T. Stafford	TIR	9.4 km	MPC · JPL
27220	1999 FN_{25}	—	March 19, 1999	Socorro	LINEAR	·	15 km	MPC · JPL
27221	1999 FA_{27}	—	March 19, 1999	Socorro	LINEAR	·	5.7 km	MPC · JPL
27222	1999 FR_{34}	—	March 19, 1999	Socorro	LINEAR	·	7.5 km	MPC · JPL
27223	1999 GC_{5}	—	April 7, 1999	Nachi-Katsuura	Y. Shimizu, T. Urata	·	16 km	MPC · JPL
27224 Telus	1999 GC_{9}	Telus	April 10, 1999	Anderson Mesa	LONEOS	V	2.0 km	MPC · JPL
27225	1999 GB_{17}	—	April 15, 1999	Socorro	LINEAR	EUN	7.3 km	MPC · JPL
27226	1999 GC_{17}	—	April 15, 1999	Socorro	LINEAR	·	23 km	MPC · JPL
27227 McAdam	1999 GB_{48}	McAdam	April 7, 1999	Anderson Mesa	LONEOS	·	10 km	MPC · JPL
27228	1999 JG_{11}	—	May 9, 1999	Višnjan Observatory	K. Korlević	·	5.6 km	MPC · JPL
27229	1999 JX_{37}	—	May 10, 1999	Socorro	LINEAR	TIR	9.2 km	MPC · JPL
27230	1999 JD_{50}	—	May 10, 1999	Socorro	LINEAR	·	3.7 km	MPC · JPL
27231	1999 JM_{57}	—	May 10, 1999	Socorro	LINEAR	·	8.0 km	MPC · JPL
27232	1999 JE_{122}	—	May 13, 1999	Socorro	LINEAR	KOR	4.5 km	MPC · JPL
27233 Mahajan	1999 NP_{8}	Mahajan	July 13, 1999	Socorro	LINEAR	·	5.2 km	MPC · JPL
27234 Timdodd	1999 RC_{2}	Timdodd	September 6, 1999	Catalina	CSS	·	1.9 km	MPC · JPL
27235	1999 RA_{46}	—	September 7, 1999	Socorro	LINEAR	·	3.2 km	MPC · JPL
27236 Millermatt	1999 RU_{96}	Millermatt	September 7, 1999	Socorro	LINEAR	·	2.7 km	MPC · JPL
27237	1999 RR_{102}	—	September 8, 1999	Socorro	LINEAR	EOS	6.2 km	MPC · JPL
27238 Keenanmonks	1999 RL_{173}	Keenanmonks	September 9, 1999	Socorro	LINEAR	·	4.1 km	MPC · JPL
27239 O'Dorney	1999 RW_{211}	O'Dorney	September 8, 1999	Socorro	LINEAR	·	2.7 km	MPC · JPL
27240 Robhall	1999 TR_{36}	Robhall	October 12, 1999	Anderson Mesa	LONEOS	PHO · slow	4.1 km	MPC · JPL
27241 Sunilpai	1999 TP_{93}	Sunilpai	October 2, 1999	Socorro	LINEAR	·	2.3 km	MPC · JPL
27242	1999 TN_{219}	—	October 1, 1999	Catalina	CSS	·	3.5 km	MPC · JPL
27243	1999 UK_{24}	—	October 28, 1999	Catalina	CSS	V	3.0 km	MPC · JPL
27244 Parthasarathy	1999 VA_{34}	Parthasarathy	November 3, 1999	Socorro	LINEAR	NYS ·	4.0 km	MPC · JPL
27245	1999 VJ_{149}	—	November 14, 1999	Socorro	LINEAR	NYS	2.5 km	MPC · JPL
27246	1999 VU_{194}	—	November 2, 1999	Catalina	CSS	·	1.8 km	MPC · JPL
27247	1999 VA_{200}	—	November 5, 1999	Catalina	CSS	PHO	2.6 km	MPC · JPL
27248 Schristensen	1999 VN_{210}	Schristensen	November 12, 1999	Anderson Mesa	LONEOS	·	2.2 km	MPC · JPL
27249	1999 WO_{8}	—	November 28, 1999	Gnosca	S. Sposetti	·	4.4 km	MPC · JPL
27250	1999 XB	—	December 1, 1999	Socorro	LINEAR	·	3.7 km	MPC · JPL
27251	1999 XG_{14}	—	December 5, 1999	Socorro	LINEAR	·	6.5 km	MPC · JPL
27252	1999 XK_{14}	—	December 5, 1999	Socorro	LINEAR	·	6.0 km	MPC · JPL
27253 Graceleanor	1999 XC_{28}	Graceleanor	December 6, 1999	Socorro	LINEAR	·	4.3 km	MPC · JPL
27254 Shubhrosaha	1999 XZ_{29}	Shubhrosaha	December 6, 1999	Socorro	LINEAR	V	1.4 km	MPC · JPL
27255	1999 XD_{34}	—	December 6, 1999	Socorro	LINEAR	V	3.1 km	MPC · JPL
27256	1999 XF_{34}	—	December 6, 1999	Socorro	LINEAR	·	4.0 km	MPC · JPL
27257 Tang-Quan	1999 XG_{34}	Tang-Quan	December 6, 1999	Socorro	LINEAR	·	3.0 km	MPC · JPL
27258 Chelseavoss	1999 XF_{49}	Chelseavoss	December 7, 1999	Socorro	LINEAR	·	2.6 km	MPC · JPL
27259	1999 XS_{136}	—	December 13, 1999	Fountain Hills	C. W. Juels	·	8.3 km	MPC · JPL
27260	1999 XF_{164}	—	December 8, 1999	Socorro	LINEAR	PHO	4.9 km	MPC · JPL
27261 Yushiwang	1999 XS_{165}	Yushiwang	December 8, 1999	Socorro	LINEAR	·	5.7 km	MPC · JPL
27262	1999 XT_{184}	—	December 12, 1999	Socorro	LINEAR	V	3.3 km	MPC · JPL
27263 Elainezhou	1999 XA_{193}	Elainezhou	December 12, 1999	Socorro	LINEAR	V	2.3 km	MPC · JPL
27264 Frankclayton	1999 XQ_{205}	Frankclayton	December 12, 1999	Socorro	LINEAR	·	4.6 km	MPC · JPL
27265 Toddgonzales	1999 XV_{233}	Toddgonzales	December 4, 1999	Anderson Mesa	LONEOS	V	2.6 km	MPC · JPL
27266	1999 YH	—	December 16, 1999	Socorro	LINEAR	H	1.8 km	MPC · JPL
27267 Wiberg	1999 YH_{7}	Wiberg	December 28, 1999	Fair Oaks Ranch	J. V. McClusky	·	2.6 km	MPC · JPL
27268	1999 YS_{9}	—	December 31, 1999	Oizumi	T. Kobayashi	·	3.3 km	MPC · JPL
27269 Albinocarbognani	2000 AB_{3}	Albinocarbognani	January 3, 2000	San Marcello	M. Tombelli, A. Boattini	·	3.3 km	MPC · JPL
27270 Guidotti	2000 AY_{4}	Guidotti	January 2, 2000	San Marcello	L. Tesi, Caronia, A.	·	4.9 km	MPC · JPL
27271	2000 AD_{23}	—	January 3, 2000	Socorro	LINEAR	EOS	10 km	MPC · JPL
27272	2000 AO_{31}	—	January 3, 2000	Socorro	LINEAR	·	7.0 km	MPC · JPL
27273	2000 AT_{34}	—	January 3, 2000	Socorro	LINEAR	·	6.8 km	MPC · JPL
27274	2000 AW_{38}	—	January 3, 2000	Socorro	LINEAR	·	1.7 km	MPC · JPL
27275	2000 AB_{47}	—	January 4, 2000	Socorro	LINEAR	EOS	6.3 km	MPC · JPL
27276 Davidblack	2000 AC_{54}	Davidblack	January 4, 2000	Socorro	LINEAR	·	3.1 km	MPC · JPL
27277 Pattybrown	2000 AY_{55}	Pattybrown	January 4, 2000	Socorro	LINEAR	·	2.1 km	MPC · JPL
27278	2000 AU_{61}	—	January 4, 2000	Socorro	LINEAR	RAF	5.5 km	MPC · JPL
27279 Boburan	2000 AW_{62}	Boburan	January 4, 2000	Socorro	LINEAR	NYS	3.0 km	MPC · JPL
27280 Manettedavies	2000 AJ_{65}	Manettedavies	January 4, 2000	Socorro	LINEAR	·	3.4 km	MPC · JPL
27281	2000 AB_{68}	—	January 4, 2000	Socorro	LINEAR	ADE	4.2 km	MPC · JPL
27282 Deborahday	2000 AX_{91}	Deborahday	January 5, 2000	Socorro	LINEAR	·	2.1 km	MPC · JPL
27283	2000 AC_{92}	—	January 5, 2000	Socorro	LINEAR	EOS	6.3 km	MPC · JPL
27284 Billdunbar	2000 AJ_{97}	Billdunbar	January 4, 2000	Socorro	LINEAR	NYS	4.8 km	MPC · JPL
27285	2000 AT_{97}	—	January 4, 2000	Socorro	LINEAR	EUN	3.3 km	MPC · JPL
27286 Adedmondson	2000 AL_{111}	Adedmondson	January 5, 2000	Socorro	LINEAR	(2076)	2.6 km	MPC · JPL
27287 Garbarino	2000 AC_{112}	Garbarino	January 5, 2000	Socorro	LINEAR	·	2.3 km	MPC · JPL
27288 Paulgilmore	2000 AQ_{125}	Paulgilmore	January 5, 2000	Socorro	LINEAR	·	2.7 km	MPC · JPL
27289 Myrahalpin	2000 AF_{126}	Myrahalpin	January 5, 2000	Socorro	LINEAR	·	3.6 km	MPC · JPL
27290	2000 AM_{127}	—	January 5, 2000	Socorro	LINEAR	·	4.9 km	MPC · JPL
27291 Greghansen	2000 AV_{129}	Greghansen	January 5, 2000	Socorro	LINEAR	·	2.0 km	MPC · JPL
27292	2000 AC_{130}	—	January 5, 2000	Socorro	LINEAR	·	7.1 km	MPC · JPL
27293	2000 AX_{136}	—	January 4, 2000	Socorro	LINEAR	·	8.8 km	MPC · JPL
27294	2000 AT_{142}	—	January 5, 2000	Socorro	LINEAR	·	6.3 km	MPC · JPL
27295	2000 AU_{143}	—	January 5, 2000	Socorro	LINEAR	WAT	6.5 km	MPC · JPL
27296 Kathyhurd	2000 AO_{144}	Kathyhurd	January 5, 2000	Socorro	LINEAR	·	4.3 km	MPC · JPL
27297	2000 AT_{144}	—	January 5, 2000	Socorro	LINEAR	EUN	4.3 km	MPC · JPL
27298	2000 AD_{146}	—	January 7, 2000	Socorro	LINEAR	H	1.7 km	MPC · JPL
27299	2000 AU_{160}	—	January 3, 2000	Socorro	LINEAR	·	2.7 km	MPC · JPL
27300	2000 AA_{168}	—	January 8, 2000	Socorro	LINEAR	·	4.8 km	MPC · JPL

== 27301–27400 ==
back to top

Designation			Discovery			Properties		Ref
Permanent	Provisional	Named after	Date	Site	Discoverer(s)	Category	Diam.	Ref
27301 Joeingalls	2000 AT_{168}	Joeingalls	January 6, 2000	Socorro	LINEAR	·	2.5 km	MPC · JPL
27302 Jeankobis	2000 AA_{171}	Jeankobis	January 7, 2000	Socorro	LINEAR	·	2.2 km	MPC · JPL
27303 Leitner	2000 AT_{180}	Leitner	January 7, 2000	Socorro	LINEAR	·	2.7 km	MPC · JPL
27304	2000 AS_{196}	—	January 8, 2000	Socorro	LINEAR	·	1.8 km	MPC · JPL
27305	2000 AJ_{203}	—	January 10, 2000	Socorro	LINEAR	·	13 km	MPC · JPL
27306	2000 AV_{203}	—	January 10, 2000	Socorro	LINEAR	·	4.7 km	MPC · JPL
27307	2000 AC_{220}	—	January 8, 2000	Kitt Peak	Spacewatch	·	2.9 km	MPC · JPL
27308	2000 AW_{229}	—	January 3, 2000	Socorro	LINEAR	·	4.7 km	MPC · JPL
27309 Serenamccalla	2000 AC_{233}	Serenamccalla	January 4, 2000	Socorro	LINEAR	·	2.3 km	MPC · JPL
27310	2000 AD_{237}	—	January 5, 2000	Socorro	LINEAR	EUN	5.0 km	MPC · JPL
27311 Shannongonzales	2000 AO_{237}	Shannongonzales	January 5, 2000	Anderson Mesa	LONEOS	·	6.3 km	MPC · JPL
27312 Sconantgilbert	2000 AD_{240}	Sconantgilbert	January 6, 2000	Anderson Mesa	LONEOS	·	7.0 km	MPC · JPL
27313	2000 AT_{243}	—	January 7, 2000	Socorro	LINEAR	·	3.7 km	MPC · JPL
27314 Janemcdonald	2000 AG_{247}	Janemcdonald	January 2, 2000	Socorro	LINEAR	·	3.2 km	MPC · JPL
27315	2000 BC	—	January 16, 2000	Višnjan Observatory	K. Korlević	·	3.5 km	MPC · JPL
27316	2000 BS_{3}	—	January 27, 2000	Oizumi	T. Kobayashi	NYS	4.2 km	MPC · JPL
27317	2000 BU_{3}	—	January 27, 2000	Oizumi	T. Kobayashi	·	2.3 km	MPC · JPL
27318	2000 BS_{9}	—	January 26, 2000	Kitt Peak	Spacewatch	·	2.8 km	MPC · JPL
27319	2000 BV_{10}	—	January 28, 2000	Kitt Peak	Spacewatch	NYS ·	5.4 km	MPC · JPL
27320 Vellinga	2000 BF_{23}	Vellinga	January 30, 2000	Catalina	CSS	MAS	2.0 km	MPC · JPL
27321	2000 CR_{2}	—	February 4, 2000	Oizumi	T. Kobayashi	·	21 km	MPC · JPL
27322	2000 CW_{24}	—	February 2, 2000	Socorro	LINEAR	·	6.4 km	MPC · JPL
27323 Julianewman	2000 CG_{25}	Julianewman	February 2, 2000	Socorro	LINEAR	·	2.8 km	MPC · JPL
27324	2000 CN_{25}	—	February 2, 2000	Socorro	LINEAR	·	5.5 km	MPC · JPL
27325	2000 CB_{36}	—	February 2, 2000	Socorro	LINEAR	·	4.0 km	MPC · JPL
27326 Jimobrien	2000 CC_{37}	Jimobrien	February 2, 2000	Socorro	LINEAR	·	4.0 km	MPC · JPL
27327 Lindaplante	2000 CW_{37}	Lindaplante	February 3, 2000	Socorro	LINEAR	·	3.5 km	MPC · JPL
27328 Pohlonski	2000 CW_{45}	Pohlonski	February 2, 2000	Socorro	LINEAR	fast	3.1 km	MPC · JPL
27329	2000 CA_{52}	—	February 2, 2000	Socorro	LINEAR	·	2.4 km	MPC · JPL
27330 Markporter	2000 CY_{52}	Markporter	February 2, 2000	Socorro	LINEAR	·	2.8 km	MPC · JPL
27331	2000 CE_{58}	—	February 5, 2000	Socorro	LINEAR	EUN	6.3 km	MPC · JPL
27332 Happritchard	2000 CE_{63}	Happritchard	February 2, 2000	Socorro	LINEAR	·	3.1 km	MPC · JPL
27333	2000 CX_{85}	—	February 4, 2000	Socorro	LINEAR	DOR	13 km	MPC · JPL
27334	2000 CN_{87}	—	February 4, 2000	Socorro	LINEAR	·	4.2 km	MPC · JPL
27335	2000 CL_{88}	—	February 4, 2000	Socorro	LINEAR	·	7.5 km	MPC · JPL
27336 Mikequinn	2000 CZ_{88}	Mikequinn	February 4, 2000	Socorro	LINEAR	·	2.1 km	MPC · JPL
27337	2000 CR_{90}	—	February 6, 2000	Socorro	LINEAR	·	3.5 km	MPC · JPL
27338 Malaraghavan	2000 CD_{93}	Malaraghavan	February 6, 2000	Socorro	LINEAR	·	4.3 km	MPC · JPL
27339	2000 CZ_{94}	—	February 8, 2000	Socorro	LINEAR	RAF	4.9 km	MPC · JPL
27340	2000 CH_{97}	—	February 12, 2000	Oaxaca	Roe, J. M.	·	12 km	MPC · JPL
27341 Fabiomuzzi	2000 CK_{97}	Fabiomuzzi	February 10, 2000	Bologna	San Vittore	·	3.1 km	MPC · JPL
27342 Joescanio	2000 CB_{102}	Joescanio	February 2, 2000	Socorro	LINEAR	·	2.1 km	MPC · JPL
27343 Deannashea	2000 CT_{102}	Deannashea	February 2, 2000	Socorro	LINEAR	·	2.9 km	MPC · JPL
27344 Vesevlada	2000 DM_{2}	Vesevlada	February 26, 2000	Ondřejov	L. Kotková	·	2.8 km	MPC · JPL
27345	2000 DC_{8}	—	February 28, 2000	Kitt Peak	Spacewatch	·	3.3 km	MPC · JPL
27346	2000 DN_{8}	—	February 27, 2000	Socorro	LINEAR	AMO +1km · fast?	1.8 km	MPC · JPL
27347 Dworkin	2000 DN_{14}	Dworkin	February 25, 2000	Catalina	CSS	·	2.3 km	MPC · JPL
27348 Mink	2000 DX_{14}	Mink	February 26, 2000	Catalina	CSS	V	2.6 km	MPC · JPL
27349 Enos	2000 DS_{15}	Enos	February 26, 2000	Catalina	CSS	·	5.5 km	MPC · JPL
27350	2000 DA_{47}	—	February 29, 2000	Socorro	LINEAR	NYS	3.0 km	MPC · JPL
27351	2000 DO_{73}	—	February 29, 2000	Socorro	LINEAR	·	2.5 km	MPC · JPL
27352	2000 DL_{74}	—	February 29, 2000	Socorro	LINEAR	·	3.1 km	MPC · JPL
27353 Chrisspenner	2000 DY_{74}	Chrisspenner	February 29, 2000	Socorro	LINEAR	·	5.7 km	MPC · JPL
27354 Stiklaitis	2000 DG_{75}	Stiklaitis	February 29, 2000	Socorro	LINEAR	NYS ·	7.3 km	MPC · JPL
27355	2000 DB_{79}	—	February 29, 2000	Socorro	LINEAR	EUN	6.1 km	MPC · JPL
27356 Mattstrom	2000 DK_{88}	Mattstrom	February 29, 2000	Socorro	LINEAR	·	3.7 km	MPC · JPL
27357	2000 DG_{99}	—	February 29, 2000	Socorro	LINEAR	·	4.8 km	MPC · JPL
27358	2000 DX_{104}	—	February 29, 2000	Socorro	LINEAR	·	2.5 km	MPC · JPL
27359	2000 DT_{106}	—	February 29, 2000	Socorro	LINEAR	CYB	20 km	MPC · JPL
27360	2000 DH_{107}	—	February 29, 2000	Socorro	LINEAR	·	17 km	MPC · JPL
27361	2000 DJ_{112}	—	February 29, 2000	Socorro	LINEAR	(1118)	14 km	MPC · JPL
27362 Morganroche	2000 EO	Morganroche	March 2, 2000	Lake Tekapo	Brady, N.	·	5.2 km	MPC · JPL
27363 Alvanclark	2000 EX_{3}	Alvanclark	March 1, 2000	Catalina	CSS	PAD	7.4 km	MPC · JPL
27364	2000 EJ_{14}	—	March 3, 2000	San Marcello	A. Boattini, G. Forti	KOR	5.8 km	MPC · JPL
27365 Henryfitz	2000 EE_{21}	Henryfitz	March 3, 2000	Catalina	CSS	·	2.6 km	MPC · JPL
27366	2000 EF_{29}	—	March 4, 2000	Socorro	LINEAR	·	9.0 km	MPC · JPL
27367	2000 ER_{35}	—	March 8, 2000	Socorro	LINEAR	·	3.0 km	MPC · JPL
27368 Raytesar	2000 EW_{36}	Raytesar	March 8, 2000	Socorro	LINEAR	·	2.7 km	MPC · JPL
27369	2000 EJ_{40}	—	March 8, 2000	Socorro	LINEAR	THM	8.4 km	MPC · JPL
27370	2000 EM_{40}	—	March 8, 2000	Socorro	LINEAR	HYG	11 km	MPC · JPL
27371	2000 ER_{40}	—	March 8, 2000	Socorro	LINEAR	THM	9.0 km	MPC · JPL
27372 Ujifusa	2000 EW_{42}	Ujifusa	March 8, 2000	Socorro	LINEAR	·	6.6 km	MPC · JPL
27373 Davidvernon	2000 EM_{47}	Davidvernon	March 9, 2000	Socorro	LINEAR	·	3.0 km	MPC · JPL
27374 Yim	2000 ER_{47}	Yim	March 9, 2000	Socorro	LINEAR	KOR	4.9 km	MPC · JPL
27375 Asirvatham	2000 ER_{49}	Asirvatham	March 9, 2000	Socorro	LINEAR	·	3.1 km	MPC · JPL
27376	2000 EB_{50}	—	March 7, 2000	Višnjan Observatory	K. Korlević	ADE	5.1 km	MPC · JPL
27377	2000 EY_{54}	—	March 10, 2000	Kitt Peak	Spacewatch	V	1.9 km	MPC · JPL
27378	2000 EG_{55}	—	March 10, 2000	Kitt Peak	Spacewatch	·	9.0 km	MPC · JPL
27379	2000 EM_{58}	—	March 8, 2000	Socorro	LINEAR	THM	5.1 km	MPC · JPL
27380	2000 EL_{61}	—	March 10, 2000	Socorro	LINEAR	·	2.4 km	MPC · JPL
27381 Balasingam	2000 ES_{64}	Balasingam	March 10, 2000	Socorro	LINEAR	·	3.1 km	MPC · JPL
27382 Justinbarber	2000 EF_{65}	Justinbarber	March 10, 2000	Socorro	LINEAR	·	2.8 km	MPC · JPL
27383 Braebenedict	2000 ES_{79}	Braebenedict	March 5, 2000	Socorro	LINEAR	·	3.6 km	MPC · JPL
27384 Meaganbethel	2000 ET_{81}	Meaganbethel	March 5, 2000	Socorro	LINEAR	·	5.0 km	MPC · JPL
27385 Andblonsky	2000 EC_{83}	Andblonsky	March 5, 2000	Socorro	LINEAR	(2076)	2.7 km	MPC · JPL
27386 Chadcampbell	2000 EO_{85}	Chadcampbell	March 8, 2000	Socorro	LINEAR	V	2.2 km	MPC · JPL
27387 Chhabra	2000 ES_{85}	Chhabra	March 8, 2000	Socorro	LINEAR	·	4.0 km	MPC · JPL
27388	2000 ET_{86}	—	March 8, 2000	Socorro	LINEAR	·	5.0 km	MPC · JPL
27389	2000 EY_{86}	—	March 8, 2000	Socorro	LINEAR	·	4.9 km	MPC · JPL
27390 Kyledavis	2000 EC_{87}	Kyledavis	March 8, 2000	Socorro	LINEAR	·	2.5 km	MPC · JPL
27391	2000 EU_{90}	—	March 9, 2000	Socorro	LINEAR	·	6.0 km	MPC · JPL
27392 Valerieding	2000 EW_{90}	Valerieding	March 9, 2000	Socorro	LINEAR	·	3.8 km	MPC · JPL
27393	2000 EL_{91}	—	March 9, 2000	Socorro	LINEAR	V	2.7 km	MPC · JPL
27394	2000 EW_{91}	—	March 9, 2000	Socorro	LINEAR	·	7.9 km	MPC · JPL
27395	2000 EX_{94}	—	March 9, 2000	Socorro	LINEAR	EUN	5.4 km	MPC · JPL
27396 Shuji	2000 EE_{101}	Shuji	March 13, 2000	Kuma Kogen	A. Nakamura	·	24 km	MPC · JPL
27397 D'Souza	2000 EZ_{103}	D'Souza	March 14, 2000	Socorro	LINEAR	·	3.8 km	MPC · JPL
27398	2000 EN_{104}	—	March 15, 2000	Socorro	LINEAR	EUN	4.6 km	MPC · JPL
27399 Gehring	2000 EC_{106}	Gehring	March 11, 2000	Anderson Mesa	LONEOS	·	2.7 km	MPC · JPL
27400 Mikewong	2000 EE_{106}	Mikewong	March 11, 2000	Anderson Mesa	LONEOS	EUN	3.2 km	MPC · JPL

== 27401–27500 ==
back to top

Designation			Discovery			Properties		Ref
Permanent	Provisional	Named after	Date	Site	Discoverer(s)	Category	Diam.	Ref
27401	2000 EH_{107}	—	March 6, 2000	Haleakala	NEAT	·	2.9 km	MPC · JPL
27402	2000 EZ_{108}	—	March 8, 2000	Socorro	LINEAR	EOS	6.1 km	MPC · JPL
27403	2000 EP_{111}	—	March 8, 2000	Haleakala	NEAT	·	3.3 km	MPC · JPL
27404	2000 EU_{112}	—	March 9, 2000	Socorro	LINEAR	·	9.9 km	MPC · JPL
27405 Danielfeeny	2000 EX_{112}	Danielfeeny	March 9, 2000	Socorro	LINEAR	·	4.8 km	MPC · JPL
27406	2000 EA_{114}	—	March 9, 2000	Socorro	LINEAR	·	6.0 km	MPC · JPL
27407 Haodo	2000 ES_{122}	Haodo	March 11, 2000	Anderson Mesa	LONEOS	·	4.7 km	MPC · JPL
27408 Kellyferguson	2000 EJ_{125}	Kellyferguson	March 11, 2000	Anderson Mesa	LONEOS	·	3.4 km	MPC · JPL
27409 Addiedove	2000 EJ_{135}	Addiedove	March 11, 2000	Anderson Mesa	LONEOS	V	2.4 km	MPC · JPL
27410 Grimmett	2000 EO_{136}	Grimmett	March 12, 2000	Socorro	LINEAR	·	1.9 km	MPC · JPL
27411 Laurenhall	2000 EF_{137}	Laurenhall	March 13, 2000	Socorro	LINEAR	·	3.1 km	MPC · JPL
27412 Teague	2000 EY_{137}	Teague	March 10, 2000	Catalina	CSS	PHO	4.3 km	MPC · JPL
27413 Ambruster	2000 EW_{138}	Ambruster	March 11, 2000	Catalina	CSS	PHO	2.0 km	MPC · JPL
27414	2000 EY_{139}	—	March 12, 2000	Catalina	CSS	GEF	5.0 km	MPC · JPL
27415	2000 EO_{145}	—	March 3, 2000	Catalina	CSS	·	3.4 km	MPC · JPL
27416	2000 EN_{147}	—	March 4, 2000	Catalina	CSS	·	2.6 km	MPC · JPL
27417 Jessjohnson	2000 EN_{148}	Jessjohnson	March 4, 2000	Catalina	CSS	·	6.2 km	MPC · JPL
27418	2000 ET_{151}	—	March 6, 2000	Haleakala	NEAT	·	16 km	MPC · JPL
27419	2000 EX_{153}	—	March 6, 2000	Haleakala	NEAT	·	6.3 km	MPC · JPL
27420 Shontobegay	2000 EF_{158}	Shontobegay	March 12, 2000	Anderson Mesa	LONEOS	KRM	7.2 km	MPC · JPL
27421 Nathanhan	2000 EK_{164}	Nathanhan	March 3, 2000	Socorro	LINEAR	·	8.7 km	MPC · JPL
27422 Robheckman	2000 ET_{170}	Robheckman	March 5, 2000	Socorro	LINEAR	·	3.6 km	MPC · JPL
27423 Dennisbowers	2000 EM_{177}	Dennisbowers	March 3, 2000	Catalina	CSS	·	2.0 km	MPC · JPL
27424	2000 EB_{186}	—	March 1, 2000	Kitt Peak	Spacewatch	·	1.5 km	MPC · JPL
27425 Bakker	2000 EP_{198}	Bakker	March 1, 2000	Catalina	CSS	V	2.2 km	MPC · JPL
27426 Brettlawrie	2000 EP_{199}	Brettlawrie	March 1, 2000	Catalina	CSS	PHO	2.7 km	MPC · JPL
27427	2000 FE_{1}	—	March 31, 2000	Farpoint	Farpoint	·	14 km	MPC · JPL
27428	2000 FD_{5}	—	March 29, 2000	Oizumi	T. Kobayashi	·	6.0 km	MPC · JPL
27429	2000 FL_{8}	—	March 28, 2000	Farpoint	Farpoint	·	5.0 km	MPC · JPL
27430	2000 FD_{12}	—	March 28, 2000	Socorro	LINEAR	EUN	4.2 km	MPC · JPL
27431 Jimcole	2000 FM_{25}	Jimcole	March 27, 2000	Anderson Mesa	LONEOS	·	4.7 km	MPC · JPL
27432 Kevinconley	2000 FO_{27}	Kevinconley	March 27, 2000	Anderson Mesa	LONEOS	·	5.5 km	MPC · JPL
27433 Hylak	2000 FM_{32}	Hylak	March 29, 2000	Socorro	LINEAR	HYG · slow	7.7 km	MPC · JPL
27434 Anirudhjain	2000 FJ_{35}	Anirudhjain	March 29, 2000	Socorro	LINEAR	PAD	7.0 km	MPC · JPL
27435	2000 FZ_{35}	—	March 29, 2000	Socorro	LINEAR	PHO	4.6 km	MPC · JPL
27436	2000 FA_{37}	—	March 29, 2000	Socorro	LINEAR	THM	8.2 km	MPC · JPL
27437	2000 FB_{38}	—	March 29, 2000	Socorro	LINEAR	V	3.2 km	MPC · JPL
27438 Carolynjons	2000 FM_{38}	Carolynjons	March 29, 2000	Socorro	LINEAR	·	6.8 km	MPC · JPL
27439 Kamimura	2000 FW_{38}	Kamimura	March 29, 2000	Socorro	LINEAR	·	3.2 km	MPC · JPL
27440 Colekendrick	2000 FD_{39}	Colekendrick	March 29, 2000	Socorro	LINEAR	·	4.8 km	MPC · JPL
27441	2000 FN_{47}	—	March 29, 2000	Socorro	LINEAR	·	6.9 km	MPC · JPL
27442	2000 FT_{48}	—	March 30, 2000	Socorro	LINEAR	·	6.1 km	MPC · JPL
27443	2000 FH_{49}	—	March 30, 2000	Socorro	LINEAR	EOS	8.3 km	MPC · JPL
27444	2000 FL_{49}	—	March 30, 2000	Socorro	LINEAR	·	11 km	MPC · JPL
27445 Lynnlane	2000 FB_{57}	Lynnlane	March 30, 2000	Catalina	CSS	·	3.3 km	MPC · JPL
27446 Landoni	2000 FJ_{60}	Landoni	March 29, 2000	Socorro	LINEAR	·	3.7 km	MPC · JPL
27447 Ichunlin	2000 GH_{5}	Ichunlin	April 4, 2000	Socorro	LINEAR	·	3.3 km	MPC · JPL
27448	2000 GQ_{6}	—	April 4, 2000	Socorro	LINEAR	·	5.5 km	MPC · JPL
27449 Jamarkley	2000 GD_{14}	Jamarkley	April 5, 2000	Socorro	LINEAR	·	4.1 km	MPC · JPL
27450 Monzon	2000 GV_{16}	Monzon	April 5, 2000	Socorro	LINEAR	·	4.0 km	MPC · JPL
27451	2000 GE_{20}	—	April 12, 2000	Socorro	LINEAR	EMA	9.1 km	MPC · JPL
27452 Nikhilpatel	2000 GS_{25}	Nikhilpatel	April 5, 2000	Socorro	LINEAR	·	7.6 km	MPC · JPL
27453 Crystalpoole	2000 GN_{26}	Crystalpoole	April 5, 2000	Socorro	LINEAR	·	3.9 km	MPC · JPL
27454 Samapaige	2000 GM_{27}	Samapaige	April 5, 2000	Socorro	LINEAR	THM	5.8 km	MPC · JPL
27455	2000 GM_{29}	—	April 5, 2000	Socorro	LINEAR	NYS	3.4 km	MPC · JPL
27456 Sarkisian	2000 GK_{35}	Sarkisian	April 5, 2000	Socorro	LINEAR	·	3.1 km	MPC · JPL
27457 Tovinkere	2000 GP_{39}	Tovinkere	April 5, 2000	Socorro	LINEAR	·	5.0 km	MPC · JPL
27458 Williamwhite	2000 GC_{42}	Williamwhite	April 5, 2000	Socorro	LINEAR	·	6.7 km	MPC · JPL
27459	2000 GR_{42}	—	April 5, 2000	Socorro	LINEAR	NYS	2.4 km	MPC · JPL
27460	2000 GW_{42}	—	April 5, 2000	Socorro	LINEAR	·	3.5 km	MPC · JPL
27461	2000 GL_{49}	—	April 5, 2000	Socorro	LINEAR	THM	8.8 km	MPC · JPL
27462	2000 GJ_{55}	—	April 5, 2000	Socorro	LINEAR	·	3.3 km	MPC · JPL
27463	2000 GR_{58}	—	April 5, 2000	Socorro	LINEAR	·	3.4 km	MPC · JPL
27464	2000 GE_{59}	—	April 5, 2000	Socorro	LINEAR	KOR	4.4 km	MPC · JPL
27465 Cambroziak	2000 GB_{62}	Cambroziak	April 5, 2000	Socorro	LINEAR	·	3.5 km	MPC · JPL
27466 Cargibaysal	2000 GJ_{65}	Cargibaysal	April 5, 2000	Socorro	LINEAR	·	3.7 km	MPC · JPL
27467	2000 GF_{69}	—	April 5, 2000	Socorro	LINEAR	·	3.3 km	MPC · JPL
27468	2000 GC_{71}	—	April 5, 2000	Socorro	LINEAR	·	5.8 km	MPC · JPL
27469	2000 GN_{72}	—	April 5, 2000	Socorro	LINEAR	·	5.6 km	MPC · JPL
27470 Debrabeckett	2000 GT_{72}	Debrabeckett	April 5, 2000	Socorro	LINEAR	MRX	3.2 km	MPC · JPL
27471	2000 GG_{76}	—	April 5, 2000	Socorro	LINEAR	·	8.5 km	MPC · JPL
27472	2000 GP_{76}	—	April 5, 2000	Socorro	LINEAR	·	9.4 km	MPC · JPL
27473	2000 GV_{78}	—	April 5, 2000	Socorro	LINEAR	·	9.9 km	MPC · JPL
27474	2000 GB_{83}	—	April 2, 2000	Socorro	LINEAR	EUN	4.1 km	MPC · JPL
27475	2000 GQ_{85}	—	April 3, 2000	Socorro	LINEAR	EUN	3.3 km	MPC · JPL
27476	2000 GS_{85}	—	April 3, 2000	Socorro	LINEAR	·	16 km	MPC · JPL
27477	2000 GT_{85}	—	April 3, 2000	Socorro	LINEAR	·	17 km	MPC · JPL
27478 Kevinbloh	2000 GB_{86}	Kevinbloh	April 4, 2000	Socorro	LINEAR	·	3.2 km	MPC · JPL
27479	2000 GF_{88}	—	April 4, 2000	Socorro	LINEAR	PAD	5.3 km	MPC · JPL
27480 Heablonsky	2000 GV_{88}	Heablonsky	April 4, 2000	Socorro	LINEAR	·	1.5 km	MPC · JPL
27481	2000 GS_{91}	—	April 4, 2000	Socorro	LINEAR	EOS	5.7 km	MPC · JPL
27482	2000 GA_{92}	—	April 4, 2000	Socorro	LINEAR	MAR	4.9 km	MPC · JPL
27483	2000 GN_{93}	—	April 5, 2000	Socorro	LINEAR	EOS	7.0 km	MPC · JPL
27484	2000 GN_{94}	—	April 5, 2000	Socorro	LINEAR	·	20 km	MPC · JPL
27485	2000 GO_{94}	—	April 5, 2000	Socorro	LINEAR	EOS	7.1 km	MPC · JPL
27486	2000 GQ_{95}	—	April 6, 2000	Socorro	LINEAR	EOS	8.5 km	MPC · JPL
27487	2000 GU_{96}	—	April 6, 2000	Socorro	LINEAR	·	4.2 km	MPC · JPL
27488	2000 GM_{98}	—	April 7, 2000	Socorro	LINEAR	·	7.2 km	MPC · JPL
27489	2000 GW_{99}	—	April 7, 2000	Socorro	LINEAR	MAR	3.4 km	MPC · JPL
27490	2000 GS_{102}	—	April 7, 2000	Socorro	LINEAR	·	7.6 km	MPC · JPL
27491 Broksas	2000 GC_{104}	Broksas	April 7, 2000	Socorro	LINEAR	·	8.2 km	MPC · JPL
27492 Susanduncan	2000 GN_{104}	Susanduncan	April 7, 2000	Socorro	LINEAR	·	4.4 km	MPC · JPL
27493 Derikesibill	2000 GU_{105}	Derikesibill	April 7, 2000	Socorro	LINEAR	PAD	6.9 km	MPC · JPL
27494	2000 GW_{108}	—	April 7, 2000	Socorro	LINEAR	EUN	4.4 km	MPC · JPL
27495 Heatherfennell	2000 GD_{114}	Heatherfennell	April 7, 2000	Socorro	LINEAR	HOF	8.3 km	MPC · JPL
27496	2000 GC_{125}	—	April 7, 2000	Socorro	LINEAR	(194)	12 km	MPC · JPL
27497	2000 GF_{125}	—	April 7, 2000	Socorro	LINEAR	TIR	8.3 km	MPC · JPL
27498	2000 GH_{125}	—	April 7, 2000	Socorro	LINEAR	(1298)	12 km	MPC · JPL
27499	2000 GW_{125}	—	April 7, 2000	Socorro	LINEAR	·	8.7 km	MPC · JPL
27500 Mandelbrot	2000 GW_{132}	Mandelbrot	April 12, 2000	Prescott	P. G. Comba	THM	11 km	MPC · JPL

== 27501–27600 ==
back to top

Designation			Discovery			Properties		Ref
Permanent	Provisional	Named after	Date	Site	Discoverer(s)	Category	Diam.	Ref
27501	2000 GP_{135}	—	April 8, 2000	Socorro	LINEAR	·	3.4 km	MPC · JPL
27502 Stephbecca	2000 GR_{137}	Stephbecca	April 3, 2000	Anderson Mesa	Wasserman, L. H.	KOR	3.5 km	MPC · JPL
27503 Dankof	2000 GM_{140}	Dankof	April 4, 2000	Anderson Mesa	LONEOS	·	2.7 km	MPC · JPL
27504 Denune	2000 GK_{141}	Denune	April 7, 2000	Anderson Mesa	LONEOS	EOS	5.5 km	MPC · JPL
27505 Catieblazek	2000 GN_{141}	Catieblazek	April 7, 2000	Anderson Mesa	LONEOS	·	7.8 km	MPC · JPL
27506 Glassmeier	2000 GQ_{141}	Glassmeier	April 7, 2000	Anderson Mesa	LONEOS	·	5.9 km	MPC · JPL
27507 Travisbrown	2000 GS_{141}	Travisbrown	April 7, 2000	Anderson Mesa	LONEOS	·	3.7 km	MPC · JPL
27508 Johncompton	2000 GS_{142}	Johncompton	April 7, 2000	Anderson Mesa	LONEOS	EOS	10 km	MPC · JPL
27509 Burcher	2000 GB_{143}	Burcher	April 7, 2000	Anderson Mesa	LONEOS	·	6.4 km	MPC · JPL
27510 Lisaactor	2000 GD_{143}	Lisaactor	April 7, 2000	Anderson Mesa	LONEOS	·	5.3 km	MPC · JPL
27511 Emiliedunham	2000 GD_{153}	Emiliedunham	April 6, 2000	Anderson Mesa	LONEOS	V	2.5 km	MPC · JPL
27512 Gilstrap	2000 GC_{167}	Gilstrap	April 4, 2000	Socorro	LINEAR	·	2.2 km	MPC · JPL
27513 Mishapipe	2000 GY_{169}	Mishapipe	April 4, 2000	Anderson Mesa	LONEOS	PHO	4.2 km	MPC · JPL
27514 Markov	2000 HM_{3}	Markov	April 26, 2000	Prescott	P. G. Comba	KOR	4.8 km	MPC · JPL
27515 Gunnels	2000 HM_{7}	Gunnels	April 27, 2000	Socorro	LINEAR	NYS	4.2 km	MPC · JPL
27516	2000 HN_{10}	—	April 27, 2000	Socorro	LINEAR	THM	7.3 km	MPC · JPL
27517	2000 HD_{13}	—	April 28, 2000	Socorro	LINEAR	·	6.4 km	MPC · JPL
27518	2000 HE_{14}	—	April 28, 2000	Socorro	LINEAR	·	12 km	MPC · JPL
27519 Miames	2000 HV_{20}	Miames	April 27, 2000	Socorro	LINEAR	AGN	3.5 km	MPC · JPL
27520 Rounds	2000 HL_{26}	Rounds	April 24, 2000	Anderson Mesa	LONEOS	·	8.9 km	MPC · JPL
27521 Josschindler	2000 HS_{26}	Josschindler	April 24, 2000	Anderson Mesa	LONEOS	KOR	4.1 km	MPC · JPL
27522 Lenkenyon	2000 HF_{29}	Lenkenyon	April 27, 2000	Socorro	LINEAR	·	3.9 km	MPC · JPL
27523	2000 HC_{31}	—	April 28, 2000	Socorro	LINEAR	EOS	7.1 km	MPC · JPL
27524 Clousing	2000 HZ_{33}	Clousing	April 25, 2000	Anderson Mesa	LONEOS	·	4.2 km	MPC · JPL
27525 Vartovka	2000 HZ_{34}	Vartovka	April 29, 2000	Ondřejov	P. Pravec, P. Kušnirák	·	3.0 km	MPC · JPL
27526	2000 HP_{51}	—	April 29, 2000	Socorro	LINEAR	·	5.3 km	MPC · JPL
27527 Kirkkoehler	2000 HL_{52}	Kirkkoehler	April 29, 2000	Socorro	LINEAR	KOR	5.2 km	MPC · JPL
27528	2000 HS_{54}	—	April 29, 2000	Socorro	LINEAR	·	10 km	MPC · JPL
27529 Rhiannonmayne	2000 HJ_{64}	Rhiannonmayne	April 26, 2000	Anderson Mesa	LONEOS	V	2.8 km	MPC · JPL
27530 Daveshuck	2000 HC_{66}	Daveshuck	April 26, 2000	Anderson Mesa	LONEOS	slow	8.8 km	MPC · JPL
27531 Sweaton	2000 HH_{66}	Sweaton	April 26, 2000	Anderson Mesa	LONEOS	EOS	6.6 km	MPC · JPL
27532 Buchwald-Wright	2000 HL_{66}	Buchwald-Wright	April 26, 2000	Anderson Mesa	LONEOS	615	6.1 km	MPC · JPL
27533 Johnbrucato	2000 HP_{70}	Johnbrucato	April 26, 2000	Anderson Mesa	LONEOS	NEM	7.0 km	MPC · JPL
27534	2000 HB_{76}	—	April 27, 2000	Socorro	LINEAR	·	5.2 km	MPC · JPL
27535	2000 HL_{76}	—	April 27, 2000	Socorro	LINEAR	EOS	4.1 km	MPC · JPL
27536	2000 HY_{77}	—	April 28, 2000	Socorro	LINEAR	·	4.0 km	MPC · JPL
27537 Dianaweintraub	2000 HZ_{83}	Dianaweintraub	April 30, 2000	Anderson Mesa	LONEOS	slow	12 km	MPC · JPL
27538	2000 HB_{89}	—	April 29, 2000	Socorro	LINEAR	·	2.3 km	MPC · JPL
27539 Elmoutamid	2000 HB_{97}	Elmoutamid	April 27, 2000	Anderson Mesa	LONEOS	V	2.7 km	MPC · JPL
27540 Kevinwhite	2000 HA_{100}	Kevinwhite	April 27, 2000	Anderson Mesa	LONEOS	slow	3.4 km	MPC · JPL
27541	2000 JU_{2}	—	May 3, 2000	Socorro	LINEAR	·	8.6 km	MPC · JPL
27542	2000 JB_{11}	—	May 3, 2000	Socorro	LINEAR	PAD	8.0 km	MPC · JPL
27543	2000 JC_{13}	—	May 6, 2000	Socorro	LINEAR	·	12 km	MPC · JPL
27544	2000 JR_{14}	—	May 6, 2000	Socorro	LINEAR	·	8.9 km	MPC · JPL
27545	2000 JX_{16}	—	May 5, 2000	Socorro	LINEAR	GEF	5.5 km	MPC · JPL
27546 Maryfran	2000 JB_{17}	Maryfran	May 5, 2000	Socorro	LINEAR	·	3.6 km	MPC · JPL
27547	2000 JW_{20}	—	May 6, 2000	Socorro	LINEAR	·	12 km	MPC · JPL
27548	2000 JY_{22}	—	May 7, 2000	Socorro	LINEAR	·	4.1 km	MPC · JPL
27549 Joannemichet	2000 JF_{23}	Joannemichet	May 7, 2000	Socorro	LINEAR	·	4.8 km	MPC · JPL
27550	2000 JC_{24}	—	May 7, 2000	Socorro	LINEAR	ADE	10 km	MPC · JPL
27551 Pelayo	2000 JU_{31}	Pelayo	May 7, 2000	Socorro	LINEAR	·	4.2 km	MPC · JPL
27552	2000 JZ_{32}	—	May 7, 2000	Socorro	LINEAR	EOS	9.3 km	MPC · JPL
27553	2000 JB_{39}	—	May 7, 2000	Socorro	LINEAR	·	8.0 km	MPC · JPL
27554	2000 JM_{39}	—	May 7, 2000	Socorro	LINEAR	EUN	4.7 km	MPC · JPL
27555	2000 JT_{43}	—	May 7, 2000	Socorro	LINEAR	EOS	9.1 km	MPC · JPL
27556 Williamprem	2000 JO_{54}	Williamprem	May 6, 2000	Socorro	LINEAR	·	6.3 km	MPC · JPL
27557	2000 JP_{55}	—	May 6, 2000	Socorro	LINEAR	·	11 km	MPC · JPL
27558	2000 JW_{55}	—	May 6, 2000	Socorro	LINEAR	CYB	8.4 km	MPC · JPL
27559	2000 JB_{66}	—	May 6, 2000	Socorro	LINEAR	CYB	14 km	MPC · JPL
27560	2000 JK_{81}	—	May 8, 2000	Socorro	LINEAR	·	5.3 km	MPC · JPL
27561	2000 KJ_{1}	—	May 24, 2000	Črni Vrh	H. Mikuž, S. Matičič	3:2	20 km	MPC · JPL
27562 Josephmarcus	2000 KJ_{54}	Josephmarcus	May 27, 2000	Anderson Mesa	LONEOS	·	15 km	MPC · JPL
27563 Staceychristen	2000 KD_{60}	Staceychristen	May 25, 2000	Anderson Mesa	LONEOS	·	5.3 km	MPC · JPL
27564 Astreichelt	2000 KE_{77}	Astreichelt	May 27, 2000	Socorro	LINEAR	GEF	3.4 km	MPC · JPL
27565 de Wet	2000 KX_{81}	de Wet	May 24, 2000	Anderson Mesa	LONEOS	·	5.7 km	MPC · JPL
27566	2000 LX_{32}	—	June 4, 2000	Socorro	LINEAR	GEF	4.6 km	MPC · JPL
27567	2000 OK_{36}	—	July 24, 2000	Socorro	LINEAR	·	10 km	MPC · JPL
27568	2000 PT_{6}	—	August 4, 2000	Socorro	LINEAR	H · moon	1.8 km	MPC · JPL
27569	2000 QW_{122}	—	August 25, 2000	Socorro	LINEAR	·	9.6 km	MPC · JPL
27570 Erinschumacher	2000 QA_{150}	Erinschumacher	August 25, 2000	Socorro	LINEAR	·	5.6 km	MPC · JPL
27571 Bobscott	2000 QT_{204}	Bobscott	August 31, 2000	Socorro	LINEAR	·	7.8 km	MPC · JPL
27572 Shurtleff	2000 QS_{227}	Shurtleff	August 31, 2000	Socorro	LINEAR	·	7.2 km	MPC · JPL
27573	2000 RU_{2}	—	September 1, 2000	Socorro	LINEAR	EOS	4.1 km	MPC · JPL
27574	2000 RT_{16}	—	September 1, 2000	Socorro	LINEAR	·	5.7 km	MPC · JPL
27575	2000 RX_{29}	—	September 1, 2000	Socorro	LINEAR	DOR	12 km	MPC · JPL
27576 Denisespirou	2000 RM_{70}	Denisespirou	September 2, 2000	Socorro	LINEAR	KOR	3.4 km	MPC · JPL
27577	2000 RZ_{76}	—	September 8, 2000	Socorro	LINEAR	EUN	3.6 km	MPC · JPL
27578 Yogisullivan	2000 SX_{142}	Yogisullivan	September 23, 2000	Socorro	LINEAR	·	4.9 km	MPC · JPL
27579	2000 TA_{29}	—	October 3, 2000	Socorro	LINEAR	EUN	5.1 km	MPC · JPL
27580 Angelataylor	2000 UJ_{23}	Angelataylor	October 24, 2000	Socorro	LINEAR	·	2.9 km	MPC · JPL
27581	2000 UR_{26}	—	October 24, 2000	Socorro	LINEAR	NEM	6.5 km	MPC · JPL
27582 Jackieterrel	2000 UJ_{50}	Jackieterrel	October 24, 2000	Socorro	LINEAR	·	3.1 km	MPC · JPL
27583	2000 UF_{72}	—	October 25, 2000	Socorro	LINEAR	·	4.4 km	MPC · JPL
27584 Barbaravelez	2000 UH_{99}	Barbaravelez	October 25, 2000	Socorro	LINEAR	·	3.4 km	MPC · JPL
27585	2000 VN_{1}	—	November 1, 2000	Socorro	LINEAR	·	4.0 km	MPC · JPL
27586	2000 XH_{34}	—	December 4, 2000	Socorro	LINEAR	EUN	3.7 km	MPC · JPL
27587	2000 XG_{39}	—	December 4, 2000	Socorro	LINEAR	MAR	4.6 km	MPC · JPL
27588 Wegley	2000 YP_{10}	Wegley	December 22, 2000	Socorro	LINEAR	HOF	6.7 km	MPC · JPL
27589 Paigegentry	2000 YV_{95}	Paigegentry	December 30, 2000	Socorro	LINEAR	·	2.9 km	MPC · JPL
27590 Koarimatsu	2000 YO_{132}	Koarimatsu	December 30, 2000	Anderson Mesa	LONEOS	·	13 km	MPC · JPL
27591 Rugilmartin	2001 AL_{15}	Rugilmartin	January 2, 2001	Socorro	LINEAR	·	2.7 km	MPC · JPL
27592	2001 AL_{44}	—	January 14, 2001	Kvistaberg	Uppsala-DLR Asteroid Survey	·	4.0 km	MPC · JPL
27593 Oliviamarie	2001 CA_{13}	Oliviamarie	February 1, 2001	Socorro	LINEAR	·	2.0 km	MPC · JPL
27594	2001 CZ_{19}	—	February 1, 2001	Socorro	LINEAR	·	3.7 km	MPC · JPL
27595 Hnath	2001 CR_{42}	Hnath	February 13, 2001	Socorro	LINEAR	·	5.3 km	MPC · JPL
27596 Maldives	2001 DH	Maldives	February 16, 2001	Desert Beaver	W. K. Y. Yeung	·	5.6 km	MPC · JPL
27597 Varuniyer	2001 DF_{14}	Varuniyer	February 19, 2001	Socorro	LINEAR	·	3.9 km	MPC · JPL
27598	2001 DZ_{28}	—	February 17, 2001	Socorro	LINEAR	THM	7.6 km	MPC · JPL
27599	2001 FN_{2}	—	March 18, 2001	Socorro	LINEAR	·	3.5 km	MPC · JPL
27600	2001 FB_{26}	—	March 18, 2001	Socorro	LINEAR	·	7.5 km	MPC · JPL

== 27601–27700 ==
back to top

Designation			Discovery			Properties		Ref
Permanent	Provisional	Named after	Date	Site	Discoverer(s)	Category	Diam.	Ref
27601	2001 FC_{29}	—	March 19, 2001	Socorro	LINEAR	H	1.3 km	MPC · JPL
27602 Chaselewis	2001 FA_{34}	Chaselewis	March 18, 2001	Socorro	LINEAR	·	2.5 km	MPC · JPL
27603	2001 FL_{162}	—	March 30, 2001	Haleakala	NEAT	·	2.6 km	MPC · JPL
27604 Affeldt	2001 FY_{174}	Affeldt	March 19, 2001	Anderson Mesa	LONEOS	·	2.5 km	MPC · JPL
27605	2001 HN_{9}	—	April 16, 2001	Socorro	LINEAR	EOS	6.2 km	MPC · JPL
27606 Davidli	2001 KW	Davidli	May 17, 2001	Socorro	LINEAR	·	7.4 km	MPC · JPL
27607	2001 KN_{1}	—	May 17, 2001	Socorro	LINEAR	·	2.4 km	MPC · JPL
27608	2001 KZ_{11}	—	May 18, 2001	Socorro	LINEAR	·	6.8 km	MPC · JPL
27609	2001 KO_{13}	—	May 18, 2001	Socorro	LINEAR	·	4.0 km	MPC · JPL
27610 Shixuanli	2001 KB_{16}	Shixuanli	May 18, 2001	Socorro	LINEAR	·	3.0 km	MPC · JPL
27611	2001 KB_{17}	—	May 18, 2001	Socorro	LINEAR	·	2.9 km	MPC · JPL
27612	2001 KG_{25}	—	May 17, 2001	Socorro	LINEAR	·	2.8 km	MPC · JPL
27613 Annalou	2001 KV_{28}	Annalou	May 21, 2001	Socorro	LINEAR	·	2.1 km	MPC · JPL
27614	2001 KN_{33}	—	May 18, 2001	Socorro	LINEAR	EUN	4.6 km	MPC · JPL
27615 Daniellu	2001 KX_{38}	Daniellu	May 22, 2001	Socorro	LINEAR	·	4.0 km	MPC · JPL
27616	2001 KY_{42}	—	May 22, 2001	Socorro	LINEAR	·	3.4 km	MPC · JPL
27617	2001 KX_{44}	—	May 22, 2001	Socorro	LINEAR	ADE	5.3 km	MPC · JPL
27618 Ceilierin	2001 KL_{55}	Ceilierin	May 22, 2001	Socorro	LINEAR	(2076)	2.7 km	MPC · JPL
27619 Ethanmessier	2001 KS_{57}	Ethanmessier	May 25, 2001	Socorro	LINEAR	·	3.8 km	MPC · JPL
27620 Kristenwalsh	2001 KO_{61}	Kristenwalsh	May 18, 2001	Anderson Mesa	LONEOS	TIR	4.8 km	MPC · JPL
27621	2001 KF_{67}	—	May 26, 2001	Palomar	NEAT	slow	10 km	MPC · JPL
27622 Richardbaker	2001 KS_{71}	Richardbaker	May 24, 2001	Anderson Mesa	LONEOS	·	2.2 km	MPC · JPL
27623	2001 LE	—	June 3, 2001	Haleakala	NEAT	EUN	4.4 km	MPC · JPL
27624	2001 MD_{3}	—	June 19, 2001	Palomar	NEAT	HYG	8.7 km	MPC · JPL
27625	2001 MX_{3}	—	June 16, 2001	Socorro	LINEAR	·	4.4 km	MPC · JPL
27626 Kirkbender	2001 NA	Kirkbender	July 1, 2001	Reedy Creek	J. Broughton	·	6.4 km	MPC · JPL
27627	2038 P-L	—	September 24, 1960	Palomar	C. J. van Houten, I. van Houten-Groeneveld, T. Gehrels	·	3.0 km	MPC · JPL
27628	2041 P-L	—	September 24, 1960	Palomar	C. J. van Houten, I. van Houten-Groeneveld, T. Gehrels	·	3.5 km	MPC · JPL
27629	2054 P-L	—	September 26, 1960	Palomar	C. J. van Houten, I. van Houten-Groeneveld, T. Gehrels	·	4.3 km	MPC · JPL
27630	2228 P-L	—	October 17, 1960	Palomar	C. J. van Houten, I. van Houten-Groeneveld, T. Gehrels	·	2.5 km	MPC · JPL
27631	3106 P-L	—	September 24, 1960	Palomar	C. J. van Houten, I. van Houten-Groeneveld, T. Gehrels	EOS	6.1 km	MPC · JPL
27632	3539 P-L	—	October 17, 1960	Palomar	C. J. van Houten, I. van Houten-Groeneveld, T. Gehrels	·	2.7 km	MPC · JPL
27633	4005 P-L	—	September 24, 1960	Palomar	C. J. van Houten, I. van Houten-Groeneveld, T. Gehrels	·	4.0 km	MPC · JPL
27634	4200 P-L	—	September 24, 1960	Palomar	C. J. van Houten, I. van Houten-Groeneveld, T. Gehrels	·	2.0 km	MPC · JPL
27635	4528 P-L	—	September 24, 1960	Palomar	C. J. van Houten, I. van Houten-Groeneveld, T. Gehrels	NYS	2.5 km	MPC · JPL
27636	4778 P-L	—	September 24, 1960	Palomar	C. J. van Houten, I. van Houten-Groeneveld, T. Gehrels	·	2.8 km	MPC · JPL
27637	2070 T-1	—	March 25, 1971	Palomar	C. J. van Houten, I. van Houten-Groeneveld, T. Gehrels	·	3.6 km	MPC · JPL
27638	2287 T-1	—	March 25, 1971	Palomar	C. J. van Houten, I. van Houten-Groeneveld, T. Gehrels	·	2.8 km	MPC · JPL
27639	3156 T-1	—	March 26, 1971	Palomar	C. J. van Houten, I. van Houten-Groeneveld, T. Gehrels	EUN	2.9 km	MPC · JPL
27640	3273 T-1	—	March 26, 1971	Palomar	C. J. van Houten, I. van Houten-Groeneveld, T. Gehrels	NYS	4.2 km	MPC · JPL
27641	4131 T-1	—	March 26, 1971	Palomar	C. J. van Houten, I. van Houten-Groeneveld, T. Gehrels	NYS	3.8 km	MPC · JPL
27642	4281 T-1	—	March 26, 1971	Palomar	C. J. van Houten, I. van Houten-Groeneveld, T. Gehrels	·	3.3 km	MPC · JPL
27643	1093 T-2	—	September 29, 1973	Palomar	C. J. van Houten, I. van Houten-Groeneveld, T. Gehrels	·	1.7 km	MPC · JPL
27644	1343 T-2	—	September 29, 1973	Palomar	C. J. van Houten, I. van Houten-Groeneveld, T. Gehrels	NYS	2.6 km	MPC · JPL
27645	2074 T-2	—	September 29, 1973	Palomar	C. J. van Houten, I. van Houten-Groeneveld, T. Gehrels	·	5.1 km	MPC · JPL
27646	2266 T-2	—	September 29, 1973	Palomar	C. J. van Houten, I. van Houten-Groeneveld, T. Gehrels	·	2.4 km	MPC · JPL
27647	2312 T-2	—	September 29, 1973	Palomar	C. J. van Houten, I. van Houten-Groeneveld, T. Gehrels	·	4.1 km	MPC · JPL
27648	3222 T-2	—	September 30, 1973	Palomar	C. J. van Houten, I. van Houten-Groeneveld, T. Gehrels	·	2.6 km	MPC · JPL
27649	3327 T-2	—	September 25, 1973	Palomar	C. J. van Houten, I. van Houten-Groeneveld, T. Gehrels	·	8.9 km	MPC · JPL
27650	5137 T-2	—	September 25, 1973	Palomar	C. J. van Houten, I. van Houten-Groeneveld, T. Gehrels	·	3.5 km	MPC · JPL
27651	2025 T-3	—	October 16, 1977	Palomar	C. J. van Houten, I. van Houten-Groeneveld, T. Gehrels	·	2.1 km	MPC · JPL
27652	2462 T-3	—	October 16, 1977	Palomar	C. J. van Houten, I. van Houten-Groeneveld, T. Gehrels	NYS	2.5 km	MPC · JPL
27653	4208 T-3	—	October 16, 1977	Palomar	C. J. van Houten, I. van Houten-Groeneveld, T. Gehrels	(5)	3.7 km	MPC · JPL
27654	5739 T-3	—	October 16, 1977	Palomar	C. J. van Houten, I. van Houten-Groeneveld, T. Gehrels	·	4.6 km	MPC · JPL
27655	1968 OK	—	July 18, 1968	Cerro El Roble	C. Torres, Cofre, S.	(194)	6.0 km	MPC · JPL
27656 Aleblain	1974 OU_{1}	Aleblain	July 26, 1974	El Leoncito	Cesco, M. R.	EOS	9.8 km	MPC · JPL
27657 Berkhey	1974 PC	Berkhey	August 12, 1974	Palomar	T. Gehrels	·	2.6 km	MPC · JPL
27658 Dmitrijbagalej	1978 RV	Dmitrijbagalej	September 1, 1978	Nauchnij	N. S. Chernykh	·	8.9 km	MPC · JPL
27659 Dolsky	1978 SO_{7}	Dolsky	September 26, 1978	Nauchnij	L. V. Zhuravleva	NYS	7.8 km	MPC · JPL
27660 Waterwayuni	1978 TR_{7}	Waterwayuni	October 2, 1978	Nauchnij	L. V. Zhuravleva	DOR	9.8 km	MPC · JPL
27661	1978 UK_{6}	—	October 27, 1978	Palomar	C. M. Olmstead	·	6.5 km	MPC · JPL
27662	1978 UK_{7}	—	October 27, 1978	Palomar	C. M. Olmstead	NYS	4.2 km	MPC · JPL
27663	1978 VP_{4}	—	November 7, 1978	Palomar	E. F. Helin, S. J. Bus	KOR	3.7 km	MPC · JPL
27664	1978 VX_{5}	—	November 6, 1978	Palomar	E. F. Helin, S. J. Bus	slow	3.3 km	MPC · JPL
27665	1978 VZ_{5}	—	November 7, 1978	Palomar	E. F. Helin, S. J. Bus	·	5.5 km	MPC · JPL
27666	1978 VU_{6}	—	November 7, 1978	Palomar	E. F. Helin, S. J. Bus	NYS	2.2 km	MPC · JPL
27667	1979 KJ	—	May 19, 1979	La Silla	R. M. West	EOS	7.8 km	MPC · JPL
27668	1979 ME_{4}	—	June 25, 1979	Siding Spring	E. F. Helin, S. J. Bus	·	5.8 km	MPC · JPL
27669	1979 MQ_{4}	—	June 25, 1979	Siding Spring	E. F. Helin, S. J. Bus	EOS	7.4 km	MPC · JPL
27670	1979 MY_{6}	—	June 25, 1979	Siding Spring	E. F. Helin, S. J. Bus	·	3.4 km	MPC · JPL
27671	1979 MG_{7}	—	June 25, 1979	Siding Spring	E. F. Helin, S. J. Bus	·	2.8 km	MPC · JPL
27672	1980 FA_{1}	—	March 16, 1980	La Silla	C.-I. Lagerkvist	·	4.1 km	MPC · JPL
27673	1980 UN_{1}	—	October 31, 1980	Palomar	S. J. Bus	·	3.7 km	MPC · JPL
27674	1980 UR_{1}	—	October 31, 1980	Palomar	S. J. Bus	·	2.8 km	MPC · JPL
27675 Paulmaley	1981 CH	Paulmaley	February 2, 1981	Kleť	L. Brožek	PHO · moon	5.1 km	MPC · JPL
27676	1981 DH_{3}	—	February 28, 1981	Siding Spring	S. J. Bus	·	4.8 km	MPC · JPL
27677	1981 EV_{3}	—	March 2, 1981	Siding Spring	S. J. Bus	·	3.5 km	MPC · JPL
27678	1981 EX_{3}	—	March 2, 1981	Siding Spring	S. J. Bus	·	4.3 km	MPC · JPL
27679	1981 EA_{5}	—	March 2, 1981	Siding Spring	S. J. Bus	GEF	3.6 km	MPC · JPL
27680	1981 EQ_{8}	—	March 1, 1981	Siding Spring	S. J. Bus	·	5.5 km	MPC · JPL
27681	1981 EG_{10}	—	March 1, 1981	Siding Spring	S. J. Bus	PAD	7.2 km	MPC · JPL
27682	1981 EC_{17}	—	March 6, 1981	Siding Spring	S. J. Bus	·	1.8 km	MPC · JPL
27683	1981 ED_{20}	—	March 2, 1981	Siding Spring	S. J. Bus	ERI	5.1 km	MPC · JPL
27684	1981 EX_{20}	—	March 2, 1981	Siding Spring	S. J. Bus	·	3.5 km	MPC · JPL
27685	1981 EE_{21}	—	March 2, 1981	Siding Spring	S. J. Bus	·	4.0 km	MPC · JPL
27686	1981 ES_{21}	—	March 2, 1981	Siding Spring	S. J. Bus	EUN	4.6 km	MPC · JPL
27687	1981 EM_{23}	—	March 3, 1981	Siding Spring	S. J. Bus	·	11 km	MPC · JPL
27688	1981 EX_{23}	—	March 7, 1981	Siding Spring	S. J. Bus	·	2.8 km	MPC · JPL
27689	1981 EU_{25}	—	March 2, 1981	Siding Spring	S. J. Bus	·	4.8 km	MPC · JPL
27690	1981 EL_{27}	—	March 2, 1981	Siding Spring	S. J. Bus	·	3.9 km	MPC · JPL
27691	1981 EA_{29}	—	March 1, 1981	Siding Spring	S. J. Bus	·	6.3 km	MPC · JPL
27692	1981 EC_{34}	—	March 1, 1981	Siding Spring	S. J. Bus	·	5.0 km	MPC · JPL
27693	1981 EG_{34}	—	March 1, 1981	Siding Spring	S. J. Bus	·	2.2 km	MPC · JPL
27694	1981 EX_{34}	—	March 2, 1981	Siding Spring	S. J. Bus	·	5.3 km	MPC · JPL
27695	1981 EW_{36}	—	March 7, 1981	Siding Spring	S. J. Bus	·	4.6 km	MPC · JPL
27696	1981 EG_{40}	—	March 2, 1981	Siding Spring	S. J. Bus	THM	6.9 km	MPC · JPL
27697	1981 EM_{45}	—	March 1, 1981	Siding Spring	S. J. Bus	·	3.0 km	MPC · JPL
27698	1981 EN_{47}	—	March 2, 1981	Siding Spring	S. J. Bus	·	1.8 km	MPC · JPL
27699	1982 JV_{1}	—	May 15, 1982	Palomar	Palomar	·	5.6 km	MPC · JPL
27700	1982 SW_{3}	—	September 28, 1982	Palomar	Gibson, J.	·	2.9 km	MPC · JPL

== 27701–27800 ==
back to top

Designation			Discovery			Properties		Ref
Permanent	Provisional	Named after	Date	Site	Discoverer(s)	Category	Diam.	Ref
27701	1983 QR	—	August 30, 1983	Palomar	Gibson, J.	·	1.4 km	MPC · JPL
27702	1984 SE_{1}	—	September 27, 1984	Kleť	A. Mrkos	·	8.9 km	MPC · JPL
27703	1984 SA_{2}	—	September 29, 1984	Kleť	A. Mrkos	·	5.4 km	MPC · JPL
27704	1984 WB_{4}	—	November 27, 1984	Caussols	CERGA	HNS	5.7 km	MPC · JPL
27705	1985 DU_{1}	—	February 16, 1985	La Silla	H. Debehogne	·	4.6 km	MPC · JPL
27706 Strogen	1985 TM_{3}	Strogen	October 11, 1985	Palomar	C. S. Shoemaker, E. M. Shoemaker	·	11 km	MPC · JPL
27707	1986 QY_{3}	—	August 31, 1986	La Silla	H. Debehogne	·	4.4 km	MPC · JPL
27708	1987 WP	—	November 20, 1987	Palomar	J. Alu, E. F. Helin	·	6.2 km	MPC · JPL
27709 Orenburg	1988 CU_{3}	Orenburg	February 13, 1988	La Silla	E. W. Elst	EOS	8.1 km	MPC · JPL
27710 Henseling	1988 RY_{1}	Henseling	September 7, 1988	Tautenburg Observatory	F. Börngen	·	1.6 km	MPC · JPL
27711 Kirschvink	1988 VT_{4}	Kirschvink	November 4, 1988	Palomar	C. S. Shoemaker, E. M. Shoemaker	PHO	3.3 km	MPC · JPL
27712 Coudray	1988 VR_{7}	Coudray	November 3, 1988	Tautenburg Observatory	F. Börngen	·	2.4 km	MPC · JPL
27713	1989 AA	—	January 2, 1989	Palomar	E. F. Helin	H	2.5 km	MPC · JPL
27714 Dochu	1989 BR	Dochu	January 29, 1989	Tokushima	M. Iwamoto, T. Furuta	·	3.0 km	MPC · JPL
27715	1989 CR_{1}	—	February 5, 1989	Gekko	Y. Oshima	·	6.4 km	MPC · JPL
27716 Nobuyuki	1989 CX_{1}	Nobuyuki	February 13, 1989	Geisei	T. Seki	·	6.3 km	MPC · JPL
27717	1989 CF_{3}	—	February 4, 1989	La Silla	E. W. Elst	·	2.3 km	MPC · JPL
27718 Gouda	1989 GH_{3}	Gouda	April 2, 1989	La Silla	E. W. Elst	·	4.5 km	MPC · JPL
27719 Fast	1989 SR_{3}	Fast	September 26, 1989	La Silla	E. W. Elst	CYB	15 km	MPC · JPL
27720	1989 UP_{3}	—	October 26, 1989	Palomar	E. F. Helin	EUN	2.8 km	MPC · JPL
27721	1989 WJ	—	November 20, 1989	Gekko	Y. Oshima	EUN	4.4 km	MPC · JPL
27722	1990 OB_{2}	—	July 29, 1990	Palomar	H. E. Holt	·	7.1 km	MPC · JPL
27723	1990 QA	—	August 19, 1990	Siding Spring	R. H. McNaught	·	18 km	MPC · JPL
27724 Jeannoël	1990 QA_{1}	Jeannoël	August 21, 1990	Haute Provence	E. W. Elst	·	3.0 km	MPC · JPL
27725	1990 QF_{4}	—	August 23, 1990	Palomar	H. E. Holt	V	5.3 km	MPC · JPL
27726	1990 QM_{5}	—	August 29, 1990	Palomar	H. E. Holt	·	9.6 km	MPC · JPL
27727	1990 QM_{7}	—	August 20, 1990	La Silla	E. W. Elst	V	2.5 km	MPC · JPL
27728	1990 QD_{8}	—	August 16, 1990	La Silla	E. W. Elst	HYG	9.6 km	MPC · JPL
27729	1990 QK_{9}	—	August 16, 1990	La Silla	E. W. Elst	V	2.0 km	MPC · JPL
27730	1990 QU_{9}	—	August 26, 1990	Palomar	H. E. Holt	·	13 km	MPC · JPL
27731	1990 RK_{3}	—	September 14, 1990	Palomar	H. E. Holt	NYS	3.0 km	MPC · JPL
27732	1990 RH_{7}	—	September 13, 1990	La Silla	H. Debehogne	THM	5.5 km	MPC · JPL
27733	1990 RM_{7}	—	September 13, 1990	La Silla	H. Debehogne	THM	7.2 km	MPC · JPL
27734	1990 RA_{8}	—	September 14, 1990	La Silla	H. Debehogne	NYS ·	3.8 km	MPC · JPL
27735	1990 SZ_{5}	—	September 22, 1990	La Silla	E. W. Elst	·	10 km	MPC · JPL
27736 Ekaterinburg	1990 SA_{6}	Ekaterinburg	September 22, 1990	La Silla	E. W. Elst	·	17 km	MPC · JPL
27737	1990 SA_{8}	—	September 22, 1990	La Silla	E. W. Elst	NYS	3.3 km	MPC · JPL
27738	1990 TT_{4}	—	October 9, 1990	Siding Spring	R. H. McNaught	LIX	15 km	MPC · JPL
27739 Kimihiro	1990 UV	Kimihiro	October 17, 1990	Geisei	T. Seki	V	2.2 km	MPC · JPL
27740 Obatomoyuki	1990 UC_{1}	Obatomoyuki	October 20, 1990	Geisei	T. Seki	·	4.7 km	MPC · JPL
27741	1990 UJ_{4}	—	October 16, 1990	La Silla	E. W. Elst	·	6.7 km	MPC · JPL
27742	1990 UP_{4}	—	October 16, 1990	La Silla	E. W. Elst	·	5.0 km	MPC · JPL
27743	1990 VM	—	November 8, 1990	Siding Spring	R. H. McNaught	·	14 km	MPC · JPL
27744	1990 VO_{6}	—	November 15, 1990	La Silla	E. W. Elst	·	2.3 km	MPC · JPL
27745	1990 WS	—	November 18, 1990	La Silla	E. W. Elst	V	2.0 km	MPC · JPL
27746	1990 WE_{3}	—	November 18, 1990	La Silla	E. W. Elst	·	4.9 km	MPC · JPL
27747	1990 YW	—	December 18, 1990	Palomar	E. F. Helin	·	9.6 km	MPC · JPL
27748 Vivianhoette	1991 AL	Vivianhoette	January 9, 1991	Yatsugatake	S. Izumikawa, O. Muramatsu	·	4.5 km	MPC · JPL
27749 Tsukadaken	1991 BJ_{2}	Tsukadaken	January 23, 1991	Kitami	K. Endate, K. Watanabe	(5)	3.4 km	MPC · JPL
27750	1991 CW_{2}	—	February 14, 1991	Palomar	E. F. Helin	·	4.2 km	MPC · JPL
27751	1991 FQ_{2}	—	March 20, 1991	La Silla	H. Debehogne	·	3.3 km	MPC · JPL
27752	1991 GL_{8}	—	April 8, 1991	La Silla	E. W. Elst	·	5.3 km	MPC · JPL
27753	1991 PF_{5}	—	August 3, 1991	La Silla	E. W. Elst	·	2.7 km	MPC · JPL
27754	1991 PP_{9}	—	August 5, 1991	Palomar	H. E. Holt	DOR	11 km	MPC · JPL
27755	1991 PD_{11}	—	August 7, 1991	Palomar	H. E. Holt	·	2.7 km	MPC · JPL
27756	1991 PS_{14}	—	August 6, 1991	Palomar	H. E. Holt	·	1.8 km	MPC · JPL
27757	1991 PO_{18}	—	August 7, 1991	Palomar	H. E. Holt	·	3.6 km	MPC · JPL
27758 Michelson	1991 RJ_{4}	Michelson	September 12, 1991	Tautenburg Observatory	F. Börngen, L. D. Schmadel	·	5.3 km	MPC · JPL
27759	1991 RE_{6}	—	September 13, 1991	Palomar	H. E. Holt	EOS	8.6 km	MPC · JPL
27760	1991 RB_{7}	—	September 2, 1991	Siding Spring	R. H. McNaught	·	2.6 km	MPC · JPL
27761	1991 RL_{13}	—	September 13, 1991	Palomar	H. E. Holt	·	2.4 km	MPC · JPL
27762	1991 RD_{16}	—	September 15, 1991	Palomar	H. E. Holt	·	2.0 km	MPC · JPL
27763	1991 RN_{22}	—	September 15, 1991	Palomar	H. E. Holt	·	2.1 km	MPC · JPL
27764 von Flüe	1991 RV_{40}	von Flüe	September 10, 1991	Tautenburg Observatory	F. Börngen	·	5.7 km	MPC · JPL
27765 Brockhaus	1991 RJ_{41}	Brockhaus	September 10, 1991	Tautenburg Observatory	F. Börngen	V	2.6 km	MPC · JPL
27766	1991 TO	—	October 1, 1991	Siding Spring	R. H. McNaught	·	2.2 km	MPC · JPL
27767	1991 TP	—	October 1, 1991	Siding Spring	R. H. McNaught	·	13 km	MPC · JPL
27768	1991 UV_{1}	—	October 29, 1991	Kushiro	S. Ueda, H. Kaneda	·	2.5 km	MPC · JPL
27769	1991 UA_{3}	—	October 31, 1991	Kushiro	S. Ueda, H. Kaneda	·	6.0 km	MPC · JPL
27770	1991 VF_{1}	—	November 4, 1991	Kushiro	S. Ueda, H. Kaneda	·	3.7 km	MPC · JPL
27771	1991 VY_{2}	—	November 5, 1991	Dynic	A. Sugie	fast	4.0 km	MPC · JPL
27772	1991 VD_{6}	—	November 2, 1991	La Silla	E. W. Elst	·	6.0 km	MPC · JPL
27773	1991 VN_{8}	—	November 4, 1991	Kitt Peak	Spacewatch	·	2.1 km	MPC · JPL
27774	1991 YB_{1}	—	December 29, 1991	Haute Provence	E. W. Elst	·	5.8 km	MPC · JPL
27775 Lilialmanzor	1992 CA_{3}	Lilialmanzor	February 2, 1992	La Silla	E. W. Elst	V	4.2 km	MPC · JPL
27776 Cortland	1992 DH_{1}	Cortland	February 25, 1992	Palomar	C. S. Shoemaker, D. H. Levy	H	2.3 km	MPC · JPL
27777	1992 DN_{3}	—	February 25, 1992	Kitt Peak	Spacewatch	·	3.7 km	MPC · JPL
27778	1992 DF_{6}	—	February 29, 1992	La Silla	UESAC	NYS	4.5 km	MPC · JPL
27779	1992 DY_{8}	—	February 29, 1992	La Silla	UESAC	·	5.9 km	MPC · JPL
27780	1992 ER_{18}	—	March 1, 1992	La Silla	UESAC	·	3.9 km	MPC · JPL
27781	1992 EE_{19}	—	March 1, 1992	La Silla	UESAC	·	2.5 km	MPC · JPL
27782	1992 EH_{24}	—	March 2, 1992	La Silla	UESAC	·	2.2 km	MPC · JPL
27783	1992 GV_{3}	—	April 4, 1992	La Silla	E. W. Elst	·	4.4 km	MPC · JPL
27784 Elizabethpearce	1992 OE	Elizabethpearce	July 27, 1992	Siding Spring	R. H. McNaught	·	4.2 km	MPC · JPL
27785	1992 OE_{3}	—	July 26, 1992	La Silla	E. W. Elst	LEO	5.7 km	MPC · JPL
27786	1992 PN_{1}	—	August 8, 1992	Caussols	E. W. Elst	EUN	4.8 km	MPC · JPL
27787 Andokazuma	1992 UO_{6}	Andokazuma	October 28, 1992	Kitami	K. Endate, K. Watanabe	DOR	9.5 km	MPC · JPL
27788	1993 AS	—	January 13, 1993	Kushiro	S. Ueda, H. Kaneda	·	13 km	MPC · JPL
27789 Astrakhan	1993 BB_{7}	Astrakhan	January 23, 1993	La Silla	E. W. Elst	EOS	9.4 km	MPC · JPL
27790 Urashimataro	1993 CG_{1}	Urashimataro	February 13, 1993	Geisei	T. Seki	VER	11 km	MPC · JPL
27791 Masaru	1993 DD_{1}	Masaru	February 24, 1993	Yatsugatake	Y. Kushida, O. Muramatsu	·	3.1 km	MPC · JPL
27792 Fridakahlo	1993 DR_{2}	Fridakahlo	February 20, 1993	Caussols	E. W. Elst	EOS	8.9 km	MPC · JPL
27793	1993 FL_{1}	—	March 25, 1993	Kushiro	S. Ueda, H. Kaneda	V	3.2 km	MPC · JPL
27794	1993 FY_{5}	—	March 17, 1993	La Silla	UESAC	·	2.4 km	MPC · JPL
27795	1993 FO_{12}	—	March 17, 1993	La Silla	UESAC	·	3.4 km	MPC · JPL
27796	1993 FK_{13}	—	March 17, 1993	La Silla	UESAC	V	2.5 km	MPC · JPL
27797	1993 FQ_{17}	—	March 17, 1993	La Silla	UESAC	·	2.2 km	MPC · JPL
27798	1993 FJ_{19}	—	March 17, 1993	La Silla	UESAC	·	3.6 km	MPC · JPL
27799	1993 FQ_{23}	—	March 21, 1993	La Silla	UESAC	·	2.2 km	MPC · JPL
27800	1993 FA_{28}	—	March 21, 1993	La Silla	UESAC	·	2.2 km	MPC · JPL

== 27801–27900 ==
back to top

Designation			Discovery			Properties		Ref
Permanent	Provisional	Named after	Date	Site	Discoverer(s)	Category	Diam.	Ref
27801	1993 FS_{28}	—	March 21, 1993	La Silla	UESAC	·	2.1 km	MPC · JPL
27802	1993 FY_{30}	—	March 19, 1993	La Silla	UESAC	TIR	7.8 km	MPC · JPL
27803	1993 FU_{35}	—	March 19, 1993	La Silla	UESAC	THM	9.3 km	MPC · JPL
27804	1993 FP_{38}	—	March 19, 1993	La Silla	UESAC	·	2.3 km	MPC · JPL
27805	1993 FJ_{40}	—	March 19, 1993	La Silla	UESAC	·	3.0 km	MPC · JPL
27806	1993 FS_{46}	—	March 19, 1993	La Silla	UESAC	·	2.8 km	MPC · JPL
27807	1993 FF_{49}	—	March 19, 1993	La Silla	UESAC	·	9.2 km	MPC · JPL
27808	1993 FT_{56}	—	March 17, 1993	La Silla	UESAC	·	2.7 km	MPC · JPL
27809 Murakamiyasuhiko	1993 HS_{1}	Murakamiyasuhiko	April 20, 1993	Kitami	K. Endate, K. Watanabe	·	3.4 km	MPC · JPL
27810 Daveturner	1993 OC_{2}	Daveturner	July 23, 1993	Palomar	C. S. Shoemaker, D. H. Levy	H · slow	2.9 km	MPC · JPL
27811	1993 OA_{7}	—	July 20, 1993	La Silla	E. W. Elst	NYS	7.2 km	MPC · JPL
27812	1993 OJ_{8}	—	July 20, 1993	La Silla	E. W. Elst	NYS	4.8 km	MPC · JPL
27813	1993 PS_{3}	—	August 14, 1993	Caussols	E. W. Elst	·	3.3 km	MPC · JPL
27814	1993 RR	—	September 16, 1993	Kitt Peak	Spacewatch	·	2.3 km	MPC · JPL
27815 Katsuhito	1993 SA_{1}	Katsuhito	September 16, 1993	Kitami	K. Endate, K. Watanabe	·	6.3 km	MPC · JPL
27816 Naitohiroyuki	1993 TH_{2}	Naitohiroyuki	October 15, 1993	Kitami	K. Endate, K. Watanabe	·	3.9 km	MPC · JPL
27817	1993 TO_{17}	—	October 9, 1993	La Silla	E. W. Elst	·	3.2 km	MPC · JPL
27818	1993 TH_{24}	—	October 9, 1993	La Silla	E. W. Elst	KOR	3.6 km	MPC · JPL
27819	1993 TG_{27}	—	October 9, 1993	La Silla	E. W. Elst	·	3.1 km	MPC · JPL
27820	1993 TD_{34}	—	October 9, 1993	La Silla	E. W. Elst	·	3.5 km	MPC · JPL
27821	1993 TU_{34}	—	October 9, 1993	La Silla	E. W. Elst	CYB	8.1 km	MPC · JPL
27822	1993 UG_{1}	—	October 19, 1993	Palomar	E. F. Helin	·	4.7 km	MPC · JPL
27823	1993 UC_{8}	—	October 20, 1993	La Silla	E. W. Elst	(5)	2.3 km	MPC · JPL
27824	1993 UD_{8}	—	October 20, 1993	La Silla	E. W. Elst	(5)	3.0 km	MPC · JPL
27825	1993 VP	—	November 9, 1993	Kiyosato	S. Otomo	EUN	4.8 km	MPC · JPL
27826	1993 WQ	—	November 22, 1993	Nyukasa	M. Hirasawa, S. Suzuki	(5)	7.0 km	MPC · JPL
27827 Ukai	1993 XJ_{1}	Ukai	December 9, 1993	Nyukasa	M. Hirasawa, S. Suzuki	·	9.2 km	MPC · JPL
27828	1994 AY_{2}	—	January 12, 1994	Kushiro	S. Ueda, H. Kaneda	·	8.2 km	MPC · JPL
27829	1994 BM_{4}	—	January 21, 1994	Kiyosato	S. Otomo	DOR	10 km	MPC · JPL
27830	1994 CK_{14}	—	February 8, 1994	La Silla	E. W. Elst	EOS	6.5 km	MPC · JPL
27831	1994 DF	—	February 18, 1994	Oohira	T. Urata	EUN	5.0 km	MPC · JPL
27832	1994 EW	—	March 10, 1994	Kitt Peak	Spacewatch	·	1.5 km	MPC · JPL
27833	1994 PB_{4}	—	August 10, 1994	La Silla	E. W. Elst	·	2.9 km	MPC · JPL
27834	1994 PW_{13}	—	August 10, 1994	La Silla	E. W. Elst	V	3.0 km	MPC · JPL
27835	1994 PZ_{13}	—	August 10, 1994	La Silla	E. W. Elst	·	6.9 km	MPC · JPL
27836	1994 PQ_{16}	—	August 10, 1994	La Silla	E. W. Elst	·	2.8 km	MPC · JPL
27837	1994 PU_{16}	—	August 10, 1994	La Silla	E. W. Elst	·	2.8 km	MPC · JPL
27838	1994 PU_{20}	—	August 12, 1994	La Silla	E. W. Elst	·	2.5 km	MPC · JPL
27839	1994 PX_{20}	—	August 12, 1994	La Silla	E. W. Elst	·	2.9 km	MPC · JPL
27840	1994 PJ_{28}	—	August 12, 1994	La Silla	E. W. Elst	NYS	2.0 km	MPC · JPL
27841	1994 PS_{36}	—	August 10, 1994	La Silla	E. W. Elst	·	2.3 km	MPC · JPL
27842	1994 QJ	—	August 28, 1994	Siding Spring	R. H. McNaught	PHO	5.4 km	MPC · JPL
27843	1994 RM_{3}	—	September 5, 1994	Kitt Peak	Spacewatch	·	2.2 km	MPC · JPL
27844 Fumitake	1994 TG_{1}	Fumitake	October 2, 1994	Kitami	K. Endate, K. Watanabe	(1338) (FLO)	3.9 km	MPC · JPL
27845 Josephmeyer	1994 TJ_{16}	Josephmeyer	October 5, 1994	Tautenburg Observatory	F. Börngen	NYS ·	4.4 km	MPC · JPL
27846 Honegger	1994 TT_{16}	Honegger	October 5, 1994	Tautenburg Observatory	F. Börngen	NYS	2.4 km	MPC · JPL
27847	1994 UT	—	October 31, 1994	Nachi-Katsuura	Y. Shimizu, T. Urata	·	2.9 km	MPC · JPL
27848	1994 UZ	—	October 31, 1994	Nachi-Katsuura	Y. Shimizu, T. Urata	NYS	2.5 km	MPC · JPL
27849 Suyumbika	1994 UU_{1}	Suyumbika	October 29, 1994	Zelenchukskaya	T. V. Krjačko	·	3.2 km	MPC · JPL
27850	1994 UD_{2}	—	October 31, 1994	Kushiro	S. Ueda, H. Kaneda	ERI	2.9 km	MPC · JPL
27851	1994 VG_{2}	—	November 8, 1994	Kiyosato	S. Otomo	PHO	9.6 km	MPC · JPL
27852	1994 WQ	—	November 25, 1994	Oizumi	T. Kobayashi	·	4.4 km	MPC · JPL
27853	1994 XA_{1}	—	December 6, 1994	Oizumi	T. Kobayashi	NYS	3.3 km	MPC · JPL
27854	1994 YG_{1}	—	December 28, 1994	Oizumi	T. Kobayashi	·	4.0 km	MPC · JPL
27855 Giorgilli	1995 AK	Giorgilli	January 4, 1995	Sormano	F. Manca, A. Testa	·	2.7 km	MPC · JPL
27856	1995 AX_{3}	—	January 2, 1995	Caussols	E. W. Elst	·	3.1 km	MPC · JPL
27857	1995 BZ	—	January 25, 1995	Oizumi	T. Kobayashi	·	4.4 km	MPC · JPL
27858	1995 BZ_{1}	—	January 30, 1995	Sudbury	D. di Cicco	·	5.0 km	MPC · JPL
27859	1995 BB_{2}	—	January 29, 1995	Oizumi	T. Kobayashi	·	4.3 km	MPC · JPL
27860	1995 BV_{2}	—	January 27, 1995	Kushiro	S. Ueda, H. Kaneda	EUN	5.2 km	MPC · JPL
27861 Sudachikako	1995 BL_{4}	Sudachikako	January 28, 1995	Kitami	K. Endate, K. Watanabe	EUN	5.7 km	MPC · JPL
27862	1995 BJ_{5}	—	January 23, 1995	Kitt Peak	Spacewatch	·	2.8 km	MPC · JPL
27863	1995 DZ_{5}	—	February 24, 1995	Kitt Peak	Spacewatch	·	3.2 km	MPC · JPL
27864 Antongraff	1995 EA_{9}	Antongraff	March 5, 1995	Tautenburg Observatory	F. Börngen	·	4.8 km	MPC · JPL
27865 Ludgerfroebel	1995 FQ	Ludgerfroebel	March 30, 1995	La Silla	Mottola, S., Koldewey, E.	·	7.5 km	MPC · JPL
27866	1995 FZ_{6}	—	March 23, 1995	Kitt Peak	Spacewatch	·	3.2 km	MPC · JPL
27867	1995 KF_{4}	—	May 26, 1995	Kitt Peak	Spacewatch	slow	7.1 km	MPC · JPL
27868	1995 MY_{1}	—	June 23, 1995	Kitt Peak	Spacewatch	·	5.6 km	MPC · JPL
27869	1995 SR_{45}	—	September 26, 1995	Kitt Peak	Spacewatch	MAS	1.9 km	MPC · JPL
27870 Jillwatson	1995 VW	Jillwatson	November 12, 1995	Haleakala	AMOS	·	3.3 km	MPC · JPL
27871	1995 VL_{15}	—	November 15, 1995	Kitt Peak	Spacewatch	·	4.1 km	MPC · JPL
27872	1995 WU_{7}	—	November 28, 1995	Oizumi	T. Kobayashi	·	2.2 km	MPC · JPL
27873	1995 XP_{1}	—	December 15, 1995	Oizumi	T. Kobayashi	NYS	2.2 km	MPC · JPL
27874	1995 YM_{1}	—	December 21, 1995	Oizumi	T. Kobayashi	·	2.0 km	MPC · JPL
27875	1996 BL_{3}	—	January 27, 1996	Oizumi	T. Kobayashi	·	3.9 km	MPC · JPL
27876	1996 BM_{4}	—	January 24, 1996	Socorro	Lincoln Lab ETS	·	2.7 km	MPC · JPL
27877	1996 BX_{4}	—	January 16, 1996	Kitt Peak	Spacewatch	·	2.1 km	MPC · JPL
27878	1996 CE_{1}	—	February 11, 1996	Oizumi	T. Kobayashi	·	2.4 km	MPC · JPL
27879 Shibata	1996 CZ_{2}	Shibata	February 15, 1996	Nanyo	T. Okuni	·	3.3 km	MPC · JPL
27880	1996 EQ	—	March 14, 1996	Sudbury	D. di Cicco	·	2.2 km	MPC · JPL
27881	1996 EC_{1}	—	March 15, 1996	Haleakala	NEAT	·	3.4 km	MPC · JPL
27882 Ootanihideji	1996 EJ_{1}	Ootanihideji	March 10, 1996	Kitami	K. Endate, K. Watanabe	NYS	5.3 km	MPC · JPL
27883	1996 ET_{1}	—	March 15, 1996	Haleakala	NEAT	EUN	5.0 km	MPC · JPL
27884	1996 EZ_{1}	—	March 15, 1996	Haleakala	NEAT	V	2.8 km	MPC · JPL
27885	1996 ED_{2}	—	March 15, 1996	Haleakala	NEAT	·	5.3 km	MPC · JPL
27886	1996 ER_{12}	—	March 13, 1996	Kitt Peak	Spacewatch	·	2.9 km	MPC · JPL
27887 Kiyoharu	1996 GU_{1}	Kiyoharu	April 12, 1996	Kitami	K. Endate, K. Watanabe	V	3.3 km	MPC · JPL
27888	1996 GG_{5}	—	April 11, 1996	Kitt Peak	Spacewatch	·	4.0 km	MPC · JPL
27889	1996 GR_{17}	—	April 15, 1996	La Silla	E. W. Elst	·	2.7 km	MPC · JPL
27890	1996 GG_{18}	—	April 15, 1996	La Silla	E. W. Elst	PAD	8.1 km	MPC · JPL
27891	1996 HY	—	April 20, 1996	Oizumi	T. Kobayashi	ADE	8.9 km	MPC · JPL
27892	1996 HG_{25}	—	April 20, 1996	La Silla	E. W. Elst	·	4.2 km	MPC · JPL
27893	1996 HK_{25}	—	April 20, 1996	La Silla	E. W. Elst	LEO	3.8 km	MPC · JPL
27894	1996 JU_{12}	—	May 10, 1996	Kitt Peak	Spacewatch	EUN	3.3 km	MPC · JPL
27895 Yeduzheng	1996 LL	Yeduzheng	June 6, 1996	Xinglong	SCAP	MAR	3.3 km	MPC · JPL
27896 Tourminator	1996 NB	Tourminator	July 13, 1996	Modra	A. Galád, Pravda, A.	EOS	4.5 km	MPC · JPL
27897	1996 NF_{4}	—	July 14, 1996	La Silla	E. W. Elst	TEL	5.5 km	MPC · JPL
27898	1996 OS_{2}	—	July 23, 1996	Haleakala	AMOS	(12739)	3.1 km	MPC · JPL
27899 Letterman	1996 QF	Letterman	August 18, 1996	Sudbury	D. di Cicco	KOR	4.1 km	MPC · JPL
27900 Cecconi	1996 RM	Cecconi	September 7, 1996	Sormano	Giuliani, V., P. Chiavenna	·	9.5 km	MPC · JPL

== 27901–28000 ==
back to top

Designation			Discovery			Properties		Ref
Permanent	Provisional	Named after	Date	Site	Discoverer(s)	Category	Diam.	Ref
27901	1996 RR_{4}	—	September 13, 1996	Haleakala	NEAT	·	8.8 km	MPC · JPL
27902	1996 RA_{5}	—	September 13, 1996	Church Stretton	S. P. Laurie	·	5.4 km	MPC · JPL
27903	1996 RS_{11}	—	September 8, 1996	Kitt Peak	Spacewatch	·	5.2 km	MPC · JPL
27904	1996 SV_{4}	—	September 20, 1996	Xinglong	SCAP	·	5.8 km	MPC · JPL
27905	1996 SK_{6}	—	September 20, 1996	Xinglong	SCAP	·	8.9 km	MPC · JPL
27906	1996 TZ_{7}	—	October 12, 1996	Sudbury	D. di Cicco	·	8.6 km	MPC · JPL
27907	1996 TU_{9}	—	October 15, 1996	Kleť	Kleť	·	6.6 km	MPC · JPL
27908	1996 TX_{9}	—	October 4, 1996	Church Stretton	S. P. Laurie	·	6.5 km	MPC · JPL
27909	1996 TD_{11}	—	October 14, 1996	Lime Creek	R. Linderholm	·	10 km	MPC · JPL
27910 Yangfuyu	1996 TA_{14}	Yangfuyu	October 10, 1996	Xinglong	SCAP	·	3.8 km	MPC · JPL
27911	1996 TC_{14}	—	October 10, 1996	Xinglong	SCAP	EOS	12 km	MPC · JPL
27912	1996 TJ_{14}	—	October 9, 1996	Kushiro	S. Ueda, H. Kaneda	EOS	6.1 km	MPC · JPL
27913	1996 TC_{41}	—	October 8, 1996	La Silla	E. W. Elst	EOS	6.0 km	MPC · JPL
27914	1996 TN_{41}	—	October 8, 1996	La Silla	E. W. Elst	KOR	3.5 km	MPC · JPL
27915 Nancywright	1996 UU_{1}	Nancywright	October 30, 1996	Prescott	P. G. Comba	HYG	9.6 km	MPC · JPL
27916	1996 VX_{1}	—	November 1, 1996	Xinglong	SCAP	·	9.1 km	MPC · JPL
27917 Edoardo	1996 VU_{2}	Edoardo	November 6, 1996	San Marcello	L. Tesi, G. Cattani	·	8.6 km	MPC · JPL
27918 Azusagawa	1996 VJ_{4}	Azusagawa	November 6, 1996	Chichibu	N. Satō	·	11 km	MPC · JPL
27919	1996 VP_{4}	—	November 13, 1996	Oizumi	T. Kobayashi	·	6.6 km	MPC · JPL
27920 Noguchiujo	1996 VV_{8}	Noguchiujo	November 7, 1996	Kitami	K. Endate, K. Watanabe	URS	16 km	MPC · JPL
27921	1996 VY_{26}	—	November 11, 1996	Kitt Peak	Spacewatch	THM	8.7 km	MPC · JPL
27922 Mascheroni	1996 XW_{8}	Mascheroni	December 8, 1996	Prescott	P. G. Comba	slow	10 km	MPC · JPL
27923 Dimitribartolini	1996 XJ_{32}	Dimitribartolini	December 4, 1996	Cima Ekar	M. Tombelli, U. Munari	·	8.5 km	MPC · JPL
27924	1997 AZ_{10}	—	January 9, 1997	Sudbury	D. di Cicco	·	1.5 km	MPC · JPL
27925	1997 CJ_{1}	—	February 1, 1997	Oizumi	T. Kobayashi	fast	2.9 km	MPC · JPL
27926	1997 EM_{15}	—	March 4, 1997	Kitt Peak	Spacewatch	·	2.0 km	MPC · JPL
27927	1997 EQ_{32}	—	March 11, 1997	Kitt Peak	Spacewatch	·	2.0 km	MPC · JPL
27928 Nithintumma	1997 EG_{38}	Nithintumma	March 5, 1997	Socorro	LINEAR	V	1.3 km	MPC · JPL
27929	1997 FC_{1}	—	March 28, 1997	Xinglong	SCAP	·	3.9 km	MPC · JPL
27930 Nakamatsu	1997 GN_{6}	Nakamatsu	April 2, 1997	Socorro	LINEAR	·	4.7 km	MPC · JPL
27931 Zeitlin-Trinkle	1997 GU_{7}	Zeitlin-Trinkle	April 2, 1997	Socorro	LINEAR	·	2.4 km	MPC · JPL
27932 Leonyao	1997 GF_{8}	Leonyao	April 2, 1997	Socorro	LINEAR	·	2.0 km	MPC · JPL
27933	1997 GW_{14}	—	April 3, 1997	Socorro	LINEAR	·	2.1 km	MPC · JPL
27934	1997 HT_{11}	—	April 30, 1997	Socorro	LINEAR	·	2.7 km	MPC · JPL
27935	1997 JN	—	May 2, 1997	Kitt Peak	Spacewatch	·	2.0 km	MPC · JPL
27936	1997 JF_{12}	—	May 3, 1997	La Silla	E. W. Elst	·	4.8 km	MPC · JPL
27937	1997 JJ_{13}	—	May 3, 1997	La Silla	E. W. Elst	·	2.8 km	MPC · JPL
27938 Guislain	1997 JG_{16}	Guislain	May 3, 1997	La Silla	E. W. Elst	AEG	9.3 km	MPC · JPL
27939	1997 LL_{2}	—	June 5, 1997	Kitt Peak	Spacewatch	·	3.0 km	MPC · JPL
27940	1997 LB_{4}	—	June 9, 1997	Kitt Peak	Spacewatch	·	3.5 km	MPC · JPL
27941	1997 LB_{6}	—	June 13, 1997	Kitt Peak	Spacewatch	GEF	3.0 km	MPC · JPL
27942	1997 LL_{9}	—	June 7, 1997	La Silla	E. W. Elst	·	2.2 km	MPC · JPL
27943	1997 LB_{12}	—	June 7, 1997	La Silla	E. W. Elst	·	2.0 km	MPC · JPL
27944	1997 MA_{3}	—	June 28, 1997	Socorro	LINEAR	·	2.9 km	MPC · JPL
27945	1997 MK_{3}	—	June 28, 1997	Socorro	LINEAR	NYS	3.3 km	MPC · JPL
27946	1997 NA	—	July 1, 1997	Kitt Peak	Spacewatch	·	1.8 km	MPC · JPL
27947 Emilemathieu	1997 NH_{3}	Emilemathieu	July 9, 1997	Prescott	P. G. Comba	PHO	5.3 km	MPC · JPL
27948	1997 NQ_{3}	—	July 6, 1997	Kitt Peak	Spacewatch	NYS	4.0 km	MPC · JPL
27949 Jonasz	1997 NU_{4}	Jonasz	July 8, 1997	Caussols	ODAS	·	3.5 km	MPC · JPL
27950	1997 OF_{1}	—	July 30, 1997	Rand	G. R. Viscome	NYS	3.2 km	MPC · JPL
27951	1997 OG_{2}	—	July 30, 1997	Caussols	ODAS	·	3.1 km	MPC · JPL
27952 Atapuerca	1997 PR_{4}	Atapuerca	August 11, 1997	Majorca	Á. López J., R. Pacheco	V	2.8 km	MPC · JPL
27953	1997 PF_{5}	—	August 11, 1997	Xinglong	SCAP	NYS	3.9 km	MPC · JPL
27954	1997 QB_{4}	—	August 27, 1997	Nachi-Katsuura	Y. Shimizu, T. Urata	MAR	3.2 km	MPC · JPL
27955 Yasumasa	1997 QU_{4}	Yasumasa	August 24, 1997	Nanyo	T. Okuni	·	4.5 km	MPC · JPL
27956	1997 RC	—	September 1, 1997	Kleť	Z. Moravec	KOR	4.1 km	MPC · JPL
27957	1997 RV_{8}	—	September 12, 1997	Xinglong	SCAP	·	2.8 km	MPC · JPL
27958 Giussano	1997 RP_{9}	Giussano	September 9, 1997	Sormano	Giuliani, V.	NYS	2.7 km	MPC · JPL
27959 Fagioli	1997 SE_{1}	Fagioli	September 19, 1997	San Marcello	L. Tesi	V	2.3 km	MPC · JPL
27960 Dobiáš	1997 SN_{1}	Dobiáš	September 21, 1997	Ondřejov	L. Kotková	EUN	3.7 km	MPC · JPL
27961 Kostelecký	1997 SU_{1}	Kostelecký	September 22, 1997	Kleť	M. Tichý	·	2.6 km	MPC · JPL
27962	1997 SY_{1}	—	September 23, 1997	Ondřejov	M. Wolf, P. Pravec	·	3.3 km	MPC · JPL
27963 Hartkopf	1997 ST_{2}	Hartkopf	September 25, 1997	Ondřejov	P. Pravec, M. Wolf	KOR	2.7 km	MPC · JPL
27964	1997 SW_{15}	—	September 27, 1997	Caussols	ODAS	·	4.8 km	MPC · JPL
27965	1997 SH_{25}	—	September 29, 1997	Nachi-Katsuura	Y. Shimizu, T. Urata	MAS	2.6 km	MPC · JPL
27966 Changguang	1997 SA_{34}	Changguang	September 16, 1997	Xinglong	SCAP	·	7.5 km	MPC · JPL
27967 Beppebianchi	1997 TE	Beppebianchi	October 1, 1997	Bologna	San Vittore	·	5.8 km	MPC · JPL
27968 Bobylapointe	1997 TM_{1}	Bobylapointe	October 3, 1997	Caussols	ODAS	·	3.4 km	MPC · JPL
27969	1997 TT_{3}	—	October 3, 1997	Caussols	ODAS	·	6.7 km	MPC · JPL
27970	1997 TR_{9}	—	October 2, 1997	Kitt Peak	Spacewatch	·	2.7 km	MPC · JPL
27971	1997 TO_{12}	—	October 2, 1997	Kitt Peak	Spacewatch	(5)	2.7 km	MPC · JPL
27972	1997 TA_{18}	—	October 8, 1997	Dynic	A. Sugie	ADE	5.8 km	MPC · JPL
27973	1997 TR_{25}	—	October 12, 1997	Xinglong	SCAP	·	8.0 km	MPC · JPL
27974 Drejsl	1997 UH	Drejsl	October 19, 1997	Ondřejov	L. Kotková	EUN	4.8 km	MPC · JPL
27975 Mazurkiewicz	1997 UJ_{1}	Mazurkiewicz	October 23, 1997	Prescott	P. G. Comba	·	3.5 km	MPC · JPL
27976	1997 UY_{3}	—	October 26, 1997	Oizumi	T. Kobayashi	(5)	5.7 km	MPC · JPL
27977 Distratis	1997 UK_{5}	Distratis	October 25, 1997	San Marcello	L. Tesi, A. Boattini	·	4.7 km	MPC · JPL
27978 Lubosluka	1997 UN_{9}	Lubosluka	October 29, 1997	Ondřejov	L. Kotková	·	4.7 km	MPC · JPL
27979	1997 UH_{19}	—	October 28, 1997	Kitt Peak	Spacewatch	·	3.4 km	MPC · JPL
27980	1997 UA_{21}	—	October 27, 1997	Xinglong	SCAP	·	3.6 km	MPC · JPL
27981	1997 UK_{21}	—	October 20, 1997	Xinglong	SCAP	(5)	5.2 km	MPC · JPL
27982 Atsushimiyazaki	1997 UH_{22}	Atsushimiyazaki	October 26, 1997	Chichibu	N. Satō	·	5.0 km	MPC · JPL
27983 Bernardi	1997 UU_{24}	Bernardi	October 26, 1997	Cima Ekar	A. Boattini, M. Tombelli	·	5.1 km	MPC · JPL
27984 Herminefranz	1997 VN	Herminefranz	November 1, 1997	Starkenburg Observatory	Starkenburg	AEO	3.1 km	MPC · JPL
27985 Remanzacco	1997 VC_{1}	Remanzacco	November 2, 1997	Remanzacco	Remanzacco	KOR	5.5 km	MPC · JPL
27986 Hanuš	1997 VV_{2}	Hanuš	November 4, 1997	Ondřejov	L. Kotková	·	3.6 km	MPC · JPL
27987	1997 VR_{3}	—	November 6, 1997	Oizumi	T. Kobayashi	·	5.8 km	MPC · JPL
27988 Menabrea	1997 VA_{4}	Menabrea	November 7, 1997	Prescott	P. G. Comba	slow	5.8 km	MPC · JPL
27989	1997 VG_{4}	—	November 7, 1997	Oizumi	T. Kobayashi	THM	11 km	MPC · JPL
27990	1997 VD_{6}	—	November 9, 1997	Oizumi	T. Kobayashi	EOS	9.4 km	MPC · JPL
27991 Koheijimiura	1997 VW_{6}	Koheijimiura	November 6, 1997	Chichibu	N. Satō	KOR	4.2 km	MPC · JPL
27992	1997 VR_{7}	—	November 2, 1997	Xinglong	SCAP	EOS	9.8 km	MPC · JPL
27993	1997 WK	—	November 18, 1997	Oizumi	T. Kobayashi	·	6.9 km	MPC · JPL
27994	1997 WM_{1}	—	November 19, 1997	Xinglong	SCAP	EOS	9.8 km	MPC · JPL
27995	1997 WL_{2}	—	November 23, 1997	Oizumi	T. Kobayashi	·	2.1 km	MPC · JPL
27996	1997 WJ_{5}	—	November 23, 1997	Kitt Peak	Spacewatch	THM	7.4 km	MPC · JPL
27997 Bandos	1997 WV_{7}	Bandos	November 23, 1997	Chichibu	N. Satō	·	2.4 km	MPC · JPL
27998	1997 WU_{8}	—	November 20, 1997	Kitt Peak	Spacewatch	·	3.7 km	MPC · JPL
27999	1997 WV_{21}	—	November 30, 1997	Oizumi	T. Kobayashi	KOR	6.0 km	MPC · JPL
28000	1997 WC_{35}	—	November 29, 1997	Socorro	LINEAR	KOR	6.3 km	MPC · JPL

back to top

== See also ==
- Meanings of minor-planet names: 27001–28000
