= Masanori Hirasawa =

Japanese astronomer

- Education: Waseda University
- Known for: discoverer of minor planets
- Scientific career
- Fields: Astronomy
- Workplaces: Fujimori High School in Hachiōji, Tokyo, Fuchie Senior High School in Adachi, Tokyo

Masanori Hirasawa (平沢 正規, Hirasawa Masanori) is a Japanese astronomer and a prolific discoverer of asteroids. Between 1991 and 1998, he discovered 52 minor planets in collaboration with fellow observer Shohei Suzuki at Mount Nyukasa Station. Both astronomers are graduates of Waseda University, after which they named the asteroid 9350 Waseda in 1991. Hirasawa is also a teacher.

== List of discovered minor planets ==
6416 Nyukasayama	14 November 1993	list^{[A]}
6499 Michiko	27 October 1992	list^{[A]}
6918 Manaslu	20 March 1993	list^{[A]}
7028 Tachikawa	5 December 1993	list^{[A]}
7067 Kiyose	4 December 1993	list^{[A]}
7353 Kazuya	6 January 1995	list^{[A]}
7891 Fuchie	11 November 1994	list^{[A]}
7892 Musamurahigashi	27 November 1994	list^{[A]}
8100 Nobeyama	4 December 1993	list^{[A]}
8200 Souten	7 January 1994	list^{[A]}
8530 Korbokkur	25 October 1992	list^{[A]}
8551 Daitarabochi	11 November 1994	list^{[A]}
8702 Nakanishi	14 November 1993	list^{[A]}
9197 Endo	24 November 1992	list^{[A]}
9350 Waseda	13 October 1991	list^{[A]}
9386 Hitomi	5 December 1993	list^{[A]}
10171 Takaotengu	7 March 1995	list^{[A]}
10617 Takumi	25 October 1997	list^{[A]}
10837 Yuyakekoyake	6 March 1994	list^{[A]}
13162 Ryokkochigaku	22 October 1995	list^{[A]}

14036 Yasuhirotoyama	5 March 1995	list^{[A]}
14037 Takakikasahara	5 March 1995	list^{[A]}
14425 Fujimimachi	13 October 1991	list^{[A]}
14495 Kazuakiwatanabe	6 January 1995	list^{[A]}
(14999) 1997 VX_{8}	9 November 1997	list^{[A]}
(15336) 1993 UC_{3}	22 October 1993	list^{[A]}
(15352) 1994 VB_{7}	11 November 1994	list^{[A]}
(15797) 1993 UD_{3}	22 October 1993	list^{[A]}
(15798) 1993 VZ_{4}	14 November 1993	list^{[A]}
(15833) 1995 CL_{1}	3 February 1995	list^{[A]}
(15919) 1997 UA_{22}	25 October 1997	list^{[A]}
(16704) 1995 ED_{8}	7 March 1995	list^{[A]}
(18457) 1995 EX_{7}	5 March 1995	list^{[A]}
(19246) 1994 EL_{7}	14 March 1994	list^{[A]}
19254 Shojitomoko	11 November 1994	list^{[A]}
(20114) 1995 UQ_{44}	26 October 1995	list^{[A]}
22385 Fujimoriboshi	14 March 1994	list^{[A]}
(23591) 1995 UP_{44}	26 October 1995	list^{[A]}
(26982) 1997 UY_{21}	25 October 1997	list^{[A]}
(27826) 1993 WQ	22 November 1993	list^{[A]}

27827 Ukai	9 December 1993	list^{[A]}
(28223) 1998 YR_{27}	27 December 1998	list^{[A]}
(29342) 1995 CF_{1}	3 February 1995	list^{[A]}
(30962) 1994 VH_{7}	11 November 1994	list^{[A]}
(30968) 1995 AM_{1}	6 January 1995	list^{[A]}
(32914) 1995 AG_{1}	6 January 1995	list^{[A]}
35371 Yokonozaki	25 October 1997	list^{[A]}
(37675) 1995 AJ_{1}	6 January 1995	list^{[A]}
(39612) 1993 XE_{1}	5 December 1993	list^{[A]}
(39659) 1995 UO_{44}	26 October 1995	list^{[A]}
(42599) 1997 UT_{22}	25 October 1997	list^{[A]}
(58284) 1993 VW_{3}	14 November 1993	list^{[A]}
Co-discovery made with:^{A} S. Suzuki

== See also ==
- List of minor planet discoverers § M. Hirasawa
