= Shōhei Suzuki =

Japanese astronomer

Minor planets discovered: 52
see § List of discovered minor planets

Shōhei Suzuki (鈴木 正平, Suzuki Shōhei) is a Japanese astronomer and a discoverer of minor planets.

In collaboration with Japanese astronomer Masanori Hirasawa, Suzuki discovered 52 numbered minor planets at Mount Nyukasa Station between 1991 and 1998. Both men are graduates of Waseda University, which they named an asteroid after in 1991.

== List of discovered minor planets ==
9350 Waseda^{[1]}	October 13, 1991
14425 Fujimimachi^{[1]}	October 13, 1991
8530 Korbokkur^{[1]}	October 25, 1992
6499 Michiko^{[1]}	October 27, 1992
9197 Endo^{[1]}	November 24, 1992
6918 Manaslu^{[1]}	March 20, 1993
(15336) 1993 UC_{3}^{[1]}	October 22, 1993
(15797) 1993 UD_{3}^{[1]}	October 22, 1993
(58284) 1993 VW_{3}^{[1]}	November 14, 1993
6416 Nyukasayama^{[1]}	November 14, 1993
8702 Nakanishi^{[1]}	November 14, 1993
(15798) 1993 VZ_{4}^{[1]}	November 14, 1993
(27826) 1993 WQ^{[1]}	November 22, 1993
8100 Nobeyama^{[1]}	December 4, 1993
7067 Kiyose^{[1]}	December 4, 1993
7028 Tachikawa^{[1]}	December 5, 1993
9386 Hitomi^{[1]}	December 5, 1993
(39612) 1993 XE_{1}^{[1]}	December 5, 1993
(27827) 1993 XJ_{1}^{[1]}	December 9, 1993
8200 Souten^{[1]}	January 7, 1994

10837 Yuyakekoyake^{[1]}	March 6, 1994
22385 Fujimoriboshi^{[1]}	March 14, 1994
(19246) 1994 EL_{7}^{[1]}	March 14, 1994
7891 Fuchie^{[1]}	November 11, 1994
8551 Daitarabochi^{[1]}	November 11, 1994
(15352) 1994 VB_{7}^{[1]}	November 11, 1994
(19254) 1994 VD_{7}^{[1]}	November 11, 1994
(30962) 1994 VH_{7}^{[1]}	November 11, 1994
7892 Musamurahigashi^{[1]}	November 27, 1994
7353 Kazuya^{[1]}	January 6, 1995
(14495) 1995 AK_{1}^{[1]}	January 6, 1995
(30968) 1995 AM_{1}^{[1]}	January 6, 1995
(32914) 1995 AG_{1}^{[1]}	January 6, 1995
(37675) 1995 AJ_{1}^{[1]}	January 6, 1995
(15833) 1995 CL_{1}^{[1]}	February 3, 1995
(29342) 1995 CF_{1}^{[1]}	February 3, 1995
14036 Yasuhirotoyama^{[1]}	March 5, 1995
(14037) 1995 EZ_{7}^{[1]}	March 5, 1995
(18457) 1995 EX_{7}^{[1]}	March 5, 1995
10171 Takaotengu^{[1]}	March 7, 1995

(16704) 1995 ED_{8}^{[1]}	March 7, 1995
13162 Ryokkochigaku^{[1]}	October 22, 1995
(23591) 1995 UP_{44}^{[1]}	October 26, 1995
(20114) 1995 UQ_{44}^{[1]}	October 26, 1995
(39659) 1995 UO_{44}^{[1]}	October 26, 1995
10617 Takumi^{[1]}	October 25, 1997
(15919) 1997 UA_{22}^{[1]}	October 25, 1997
(26982) 1997 UY_{21}^{[1]}	October 25, 1997
35371 Yokonozaki^{[1]}	October 25, 1997
(42599) 1997 UT_{22}^{[1]}	October 25, 1997
(14999) 1997 VX_{8}^{[1]}	November 9, 1997
(28223) 1998 YR_{27}^{[1]}	December 27, 1998
^{1} co-discovered with Masanori Hirasawa
