= Kushida =

Kushida (串田), (櫛田) may refer to:

- Kushida River (櫛田川, Kushida-gawa), a major river that flows through central Mie Prefecture on the island of Honshū, Japan
- Kushida Station, a Kintetsu train station in Matsusaka, Mie, Japan
- 144P/Kushida, a periodic comet discovered in January, 1994
- 147P/Kushida–Muramatsu, a quasi-Hilda comet discovered in 1993
- 5605 Kushida, a Main-belt Asteroid discovered on February 17, 1993
- Akira Kushida (born 1948), a Japanese vocalist
- Fuki Kushida (1899–2001), Japanese activist and feminist
- Reiki Kushida, a Japanese astronomer
- Takashi Kushida (born 1935), a Japanese aikido master
- Yasumichi Kushida (1976–2023), a Japanese voice actor
- Yoshio Kushida (born 1957), a Japanese astronomer
- Kushida (wrestler) (Yujiro Kushida, born 1983), a Japanese professional wrestler
