= NGC 3987 =

Galaxy in the constellation Leo

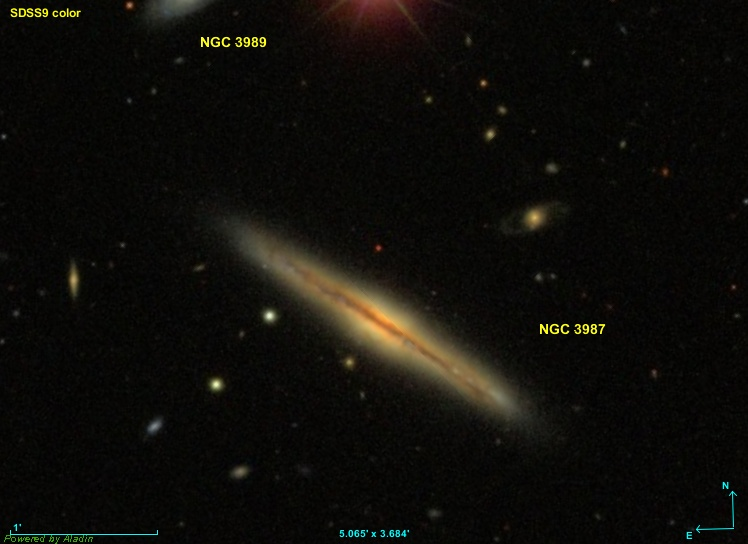
- NGC 3987 imaged by SDSS

Observation data (J2000 epoch)
- Constellation: Leo
- Right ascension: 11^{h} 57^{m} 20.9684^{s}
- Declination: +25° 11′ 42.874″
- Redshift: 0.015018±0.000017
- Heliocentric radial velocity: 4,502±5 km/s
- Distance: 196.49 ± 4.62 Mly (60.243 ± 1.415 Mpc)
- Group or cluster: NGC 3987 Group (LGG 261), Holm 308
- Apparent magnitude (V): 12.9B

Characteristics
- Type: Sb
- Size: ~179,000 ly (54.88 kpc) (estimated)
- Apparent size (V): 2.2′ × 0.4′

Other designations
- HOLM 308C, IRAS 11547+2528, 2MASX J11572090+2511436, UGC 6928, MCG +04-28-099, PGC 37591, CGCG 127-110

NGC 3987 is a spiral galaxy in the constellation of Leo. Its velocity with respect to the cosmic microwave background is 4,810±10 km/s, which corresponds to a Hubble distance of 231.4 ± 16.2 Mly (70.94 ± 4.98 Mpc). However, 23 non-redshift measurements give a closer distance of 196.49 ± 4.62 Mly (60.243 ± 1.415 Mpc). It was discovered by German-British astronomer William Herschel on 6 April 1785.

NGC 3987 has an active galactic nucleus, i.e. it has a compact region at the center of a galaxy that emits a significant amount of energy across the electromagnetic spectrum, with characteristics indicating that this luminosity is not produced by the stars. In addition, it is a LINER galaxy, i.e. a galaxy whose nucleus has an emission spectrum characterized by broad lines of weakly ionized atoms.

== Holm 308 and NGC 3987 group ==
NGC 3987, NGC 3989, NGC 3993, and NGC 3997 are listed together as Holm 308 in Erik Holmberg's A Study of Double and Multiple Galaxies Together with Inquiries into some General Metagalactic Problems, published in 1937.

However, according to A. M. Garcia, NGC 3987 is the largest galaxy in a group that bears its name. The NGC 3987 group (also known as LGG 261) is thought to have at least five galaxies, including NGC 4000, NGC 4005, NGC 4018, and NGC 4022.

== Supernovae ==
Two supernovae have been observed in NGC 3987:

- SN 2001V (Type Ia, mag. 16) was discovered by P. Berlind on 19 February 2001. Later analysis concluded that this supernova was overluminous, and its spectral features indicate it might be a SN 1999aa-like object.
- SN 2025msx (Type Ic-BL, mag. 18.914) was discovered by ATLAS on 1 June 2025.

== See also ==
- List of NGC objects (3001–4000)
