= Izumikawa =

Izumikawa (written: 泉川) is a Japanese surname. Notable people with the surname include:

- Hiroaki Izumikawa (泉川 寛晃, born 1957), Japanese modern pentathlete
- Kanki Izumigawa (泉川 寛喜, 1908–1969), Okinawan karateka
- Laura Izumikawa, American photographer
- Masayuki Izumikawa (泉川 正幸, born 1971), Japanese volleyball player
- Pete Izumikawa (泉川 ピート, born 1956), Japanese golfer
- Shun-ei Izumikawa (泉川 俊英), Japanese astronomer
- Sora Izumikawa (イズミカワ ソラ, born 1971), Japanese artist, singer-songwriter, voice actress, composer and producer
