= NGC 5683 =

Galaxy in the constellation Boötes

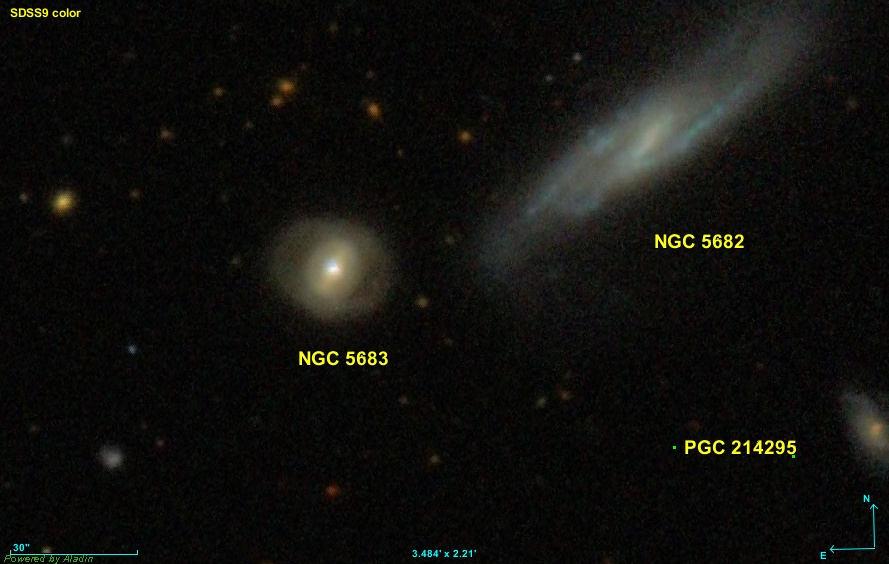
- SDSS image of NGC 5683

Observation data (J2000 epoch)
- Constellation: Boötes
- Right ascension: 14h 34m 52.447s
- Declination: +48d 39m 42.90s
- Redshift: 0.036641
- Heliocentric radial velocity: 10,783 km/s
- Distance: 513 Mly (157.3 Mpc)
- Apparent magnitude (V): 0.089
- Apparent magnitude (B): 0.118

Characteristics
- Type: SB(s)0/a?
- Size: 256,000 ly
- Notable features: Seyfert galaxy

Other designations
- PGC 52114, IRAS 14329+4853, KUG 1433+488, CGCG 248-009, MCG +08-27-003, NSA 043189, SDSS J143452.46+483942.7, 2MASX J14345248+4839429, RBS 1407, RX J1434.8+4839, SWIFT J1434.9+4837, LEDA 52114, MRK 474, CG 476, NPM1G +048.0275

NGC 5683 is a type S0-a lenticular galaxy with a bar located in the constellation Boötes. It is 513 million light-years away from the Solar System and has an approximate diameter of 256,000 light-years meaning it is larger compared to the Milky Way. NGC 5683 was discovered by George Johnstone Stoney on April 13, 1850.

NGC 5683 happens to lie near to a spiral galaxy NGC 5682, but they are far apart from each other. Nearby is another galaxy NGC 5689.

== Characteristics ==
NGC 5683 has an active galactic nucleus which presents strong x-rays. It is a Seyfert 1 type galaxy and such falls into the Markarian catalogue as Mrk 474, which its core shines in ultraviolet rays. The most accepted theory for this energy source of active galactic nuclei is the presence of an accretion disk around its supermassive black hole. It also shows high amounts of strong emission-lines which are mostly attributed to short-lived star formation in its regions likely restricted to a nuclear disk with its radius less than few hundred parsecs.

== Supernova ==
Type la supernova SN 2002db was discovered on May 18, 2002, in NGC 5683 by a collaboration of astronomers and Reiki Kushida from LOTOSS (Lick Observatory and Tenagra Observatory Supernova Searches). It was positioned 8 arcsecs west and 9 arcsecs north of the nucleus, with a magnitude of 17.6.
