= 15350 Naganuma =

Stony background asteroid

Discovery
- Discovered by: Y. Kushida; O. Muramatsu
- Discovery site: Yatsugatake Obs.
- Discovery date: 3 November 1994

Designations
- Named after: Naganuma (Japanese town)
- Alternative designations: 1994 VB_{2} · 1998 WQ_{19}
- Minor planet category: main-belt · (inner) background

Orbital characteristics
- Epoch 27 April 2019 (JD 2458600.5)
- Uncertainty parameter 0
- Observation arc: 23.69 yr (8,652 d)
- Aphelion: 3.0346 AU
- Perihelion: 1.7301 AU
- Semi-major axis: 2.3823 AU
- Eccentricity: 0.2738
- Orbital period (sidereal): 3.68 yr (1,343 d)
- Mean anomaly: 240.74°
- Mean motion: 0° 16^{m} 4.8^{s} / day
- Inclination: 4.6159°
- Longitude of ascending node: 197.86°
- Argument of perihelion: 204.64°

Physical characteristics
- Mean diameter: 4.357±0.070 km
- Synodic rotation period: 2.5835±0.0001 h (Note: Three lightcurve plots of (15350) Naganuma from 2005, 2010, 2016. Summary figures at the LCDB and Ondrejov NEO Photometric Program with Ondrejov data sheet. Pravec in October 2016, rotation period 2.58348 hours with a brightness amplitude of 0.17 mag. Quality code is 2+.)
- Geometric albedo: 0.256
- Spectral type: S (assumed)
- Absolute magnitude (H): 13.90; 14.1

15350 Naganuma (provisional designation 1994 VB_{2}) is a stony background asteroid from the inner regions of the asteroid belt, approximately 4.3 kilometers (2.7 miles) in diameter. It was discovered on 3 November 1994, by Japanese astronomers Yoshio Kushida and Osamu Muramatsu at the Yatsugatake South Base Observatory. The likely S-type asteroid has a rotation period of 2.5 hours. It was named for the town of Naganuma in northern Japan.

== Orbit and classification ==
Naganuma is a non-family asteroid from the main belt's background population. It orbits the Sun in the inner asteroid belt at a distance of 1.7–3.0 astronomical units (AU) once every 3 years and 8 months (1,343 days; semi-major axis of 2.38 AU). Its orbit has an eccentricity of 0.27 and an inclination of 5° with respect to the ecliptic. The body's observation arc begins with its official discovery observation at the Yatsugatake South Base Observatory in November 1994.

== Naming ==
This minor planet was named after the town of Naganuma, located on the island of Hokkaido in northern Japan, where the "Artists Atelier Village" was promoted for many years with more than 20 workshops. The official naming citation was published by the Minor Planet Center on 13 October 2000 (M.P.C. 41387).

== Physical characteristics ==
Naganuma is an assumed S-type asteroid, which agrees with its determined geometric albedo (see below).

=== Rotation period ===
In November 2005, a rotational lightcurve of Naganuma was obtained from photometric observations by Donald Pray at the Carbuncle Hill Observatory (912) in Rhode Island, United States. Lightcurve analysis gave a rotation period of 2.5835±0.0001 hours with a brightness amplitude of 0.20 magnitude (U=3). Concurring periods of 2.58348, 2.5835 and 2.587 hours were also determined by Vladimir Benishek at Sopot Astronomical Observatory (K90) and Petr Pravec at Ondřejov Observatory (U=2/2+/2+).

=== Diameter and albedo ===
According to the survey carried out by the NEOWISE mission of NASA's Wide-field Infrared Survey Explorer (WISE), Naganuma measures 4.36 kilometers in diameter and its surface has an albedo if 0.256. The Collaborative Asteroid Lightcurve Link adopts Petr Pravec's revised WISE-albedo of 0.20 and calculates diameter of 4.34 kilometers based on an absolute magnitude of 14.16.
