= 144P/Kushida =

Jupiter-family comet

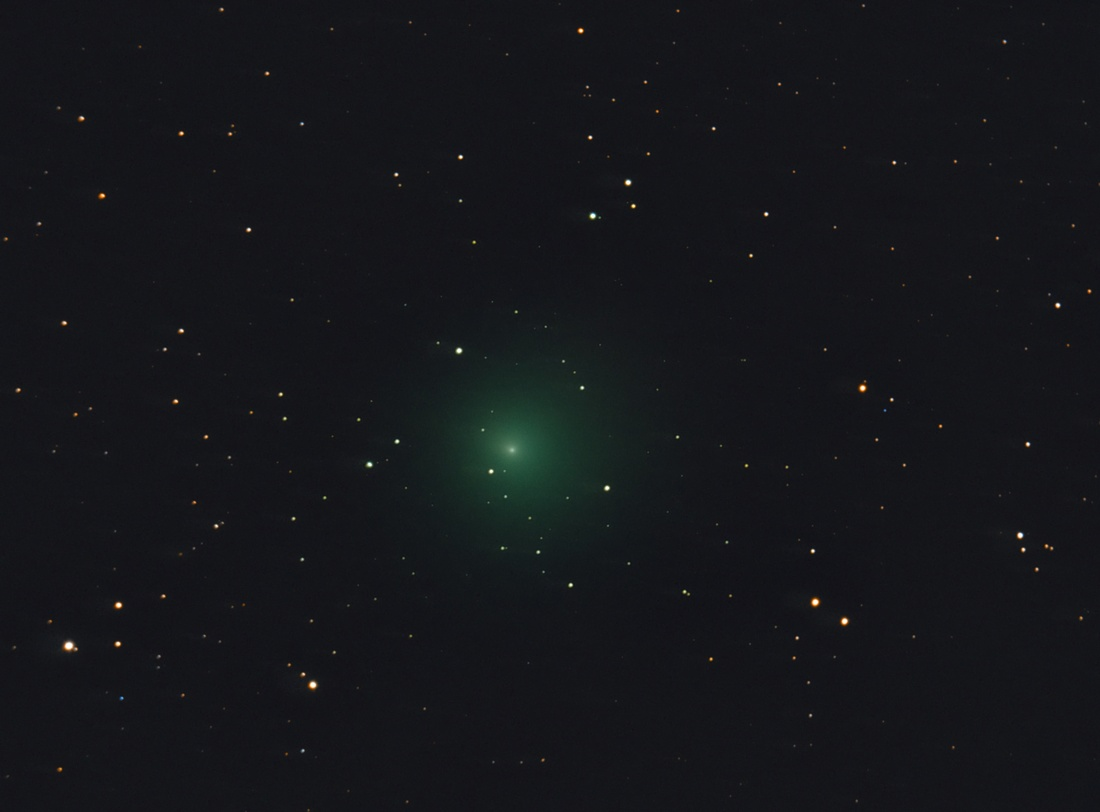
- Comet Kushida photographed by Hunter Wilson on 16 January 2009

Discovery
- Discovered by: Yoshio Kushida
- Discovery site: Yatsugatake, Japan
- Discovery date: 8 January 1994

Designations
- MPC designation: P/1994 A1, P/2000 O2
- Alternative designations: 1993 XX, 1994a

Orbital characteristics
- Epoch: 21 November 2025 (JD 2461000.5)
- Observation arc: 30.41 years
- Earliest precovery date: 7 January 1994
- Number of observations: 5,919
- Aphelion: 6.269 AU
- Perihelion: 1.399 AU
- Semi-major axis: 3.834 AU
- Eccentricity: 0.63495
- Orbital period: 7.509 years
- Inclination: 3.931°
- Longitude of ascending node: 242.92°
- Argument of periapsis: 216.37°
- Mean anomaly: 87.308°
- Last perihelion: 25 January 2024
- Next perihelion: 2 August 2031
- T_{Jupiter}: 2.681
- Earth MOID: 0.417 AU
- Jupiter MOID: 0.011 AU

Physical characteristics
- Mean radius: 1.2 km (0.75 mi)
- Mean density: 490±70 kg/m^{3}
- Comet total magnitude (M1): 12.9
- Comet nuclear magnitude (M2): 16.1

144P/Kushida is a Jupiter-family comet discovered by Japanese amateur astronomer Yoshio Kushida in January 1994. This was the first comet discovery of 1994 and Kushida's second discovery within a month. It last came to perihelion on 25 January 2024, and brightened to about magnitude 10.

144P/Kushida closest Mars approach on 2119-May-18
| Date & time of closest approach | Mars distance (AU) | Sun distance (AU) | Velocity wrt Mars (km/s) | Velocity wrt Sun (km/s) | Uncertainty region (3-sigma) | Reference |
|---|---|---|---|---|---|---|
| 2119-May-17 11:19 ± 13 minutes | 0.049 AU (7.3 million km; 4.6 million mi; 19 LD) | 1.68 AU (251 million km; 156 million mi) | 13.6 | 28.6 | ± 13 thousand km | Horizons |

Based on data gathered during the period of January 9–11, 1994 Syuichi Nakano calculated the date of perihelion to be 1993 December 5.33 and the distance of perihelion as 1.36 AU. The low inclination to the ecliptic suggested to Nakano that the comet could be a short period type. On January 14, 1994, Daniel W. E. Green confirmed Nakano's suggestion and published a short-period orbit on IAU Circular 5922. Based on 29 positions obtained during the period of January 9–13, Green determined a perihelion date of 1993 December 12.99, a perihelion distance of 1.37 AU, and an orbital period of 7.20 years.

Using over 300 positions obtained between January 7 and July 9, 1994, Patrick Rocher refined the calculations and determined the perihelion distance as 1.367 AU, the perihelion date as 1993 December 12.862, and the orbital period as 7.366 years.

== See also ==
- 147P/Kushida–Muramatsu

Numbered comets
| Previous; 143P/Kowal–Mrkos | 144P/Kushida | Next; 145P/Shoemaker–Levy |
