= 9844 Otani =

Asteroid

Discovery
- Discovered by: Y. Kushida; O. Muramatsu
- Discovery site: Yatsugatake South Base Obs.
- Discovery date: 23 November 1989

Designations
- Named after: Toyokazu Otani (astronomy lecturer)
- Alternative designations: 1989 WF_{1} · 1980 VF_{1} 1996 HA_{26}
- Minor planet category: main-belt · Eunomia

Orbital characteristics
- Epoch 4 September 2017 (JD 2458000.5)
- Uncertainty parameter 0
- Observation arc: 67.44 yr (24,634 days)
- Aphelion: 3.2894 AU
- Perihelion: 2.1105 AU
- Semi-major axis: 2.7000 AU
- Eccentricity: 0.2183
- Orbital period (sidereal): 4.44 yr (1,620 days)
- Mean anomaly: 102.78°
- Mean motion: 0° 13^{m} 19.92^{s} / day
- Inclination: 12.932°
- Longitude of ascending node: 60.733°
- Argument of perihelion: 353.14°

Physical characteristics
- Dimensions: 3.84 km (calculated)
- Synodic rotation period: 10.0730±0.0053 h
- Geometric albedo: 0.21 (assumed)
- Spectral type: S
- Absolute magnitude (H): 13.87±0.47 · 13.9 · 13.939±0.004 (R) · 14.39

9844 Otani, provisional designation 1989 WF_{1}, is a stony Eunomian asteroid from the middle region of the asteroid belt, approximately 4 kilometers in diameter. It was discovered on 23 November 1989, by Japanese astronomers Yoshio Kushida and Osamu Muramatsu at the Yatsugatake South Base Observatory, Hokuto, near the Greater Tokyo Area, Japan. It was named for Japanese astronomer Toyokazu Otani.

== Orbit and classification ==
Otani is a member of the Eunomia family, a large group of S-type asteroids and the most prominent family in the intermediate main-belt. It orbits the Sun in the central main-belt at a distance of 2.1–3.3 AU once every 4 years and 5 months (1,620 days). Its orbit has an eccentricity of 0.22 and an inclination of 13° with respect to the ecliptic. The first used observation was a precovery taken at Palomar Mountain in 1949, extending the body's observation arc by 40 years prior to its official discovery observation.

== Physical characteristics ==
A rotational lightcurve of Otani was obtained from photometric observations at the Palomar Transient Factory in February 2013. It gave a rotation period of 10.073±0.0053 hours with a brightness variation of 0.18 in magnitude (U=2).

The Collaborative Asteroid Lightcurve Link assumes an albedo 0.21 – derived from 15 Eunomia, the family's largest member and namesake – and calculates a diameter of 3.84 kilometers with an absolute magnitude of 14.39.

== Naming ==
This minor planet was named in honor of Toyokazu Otani (born 1928), a renowned observer of minor planets, lecturer at the Gotoh Planetarium, and long-time employee at the Astronomical Museum in Tokyo (1956–1988). The official naming citation was published by the Minor Planet Center on 2 April 1999 (M.P.C. 34355).
