= NGC 2962 =

Galaxy in the constellation Hydra

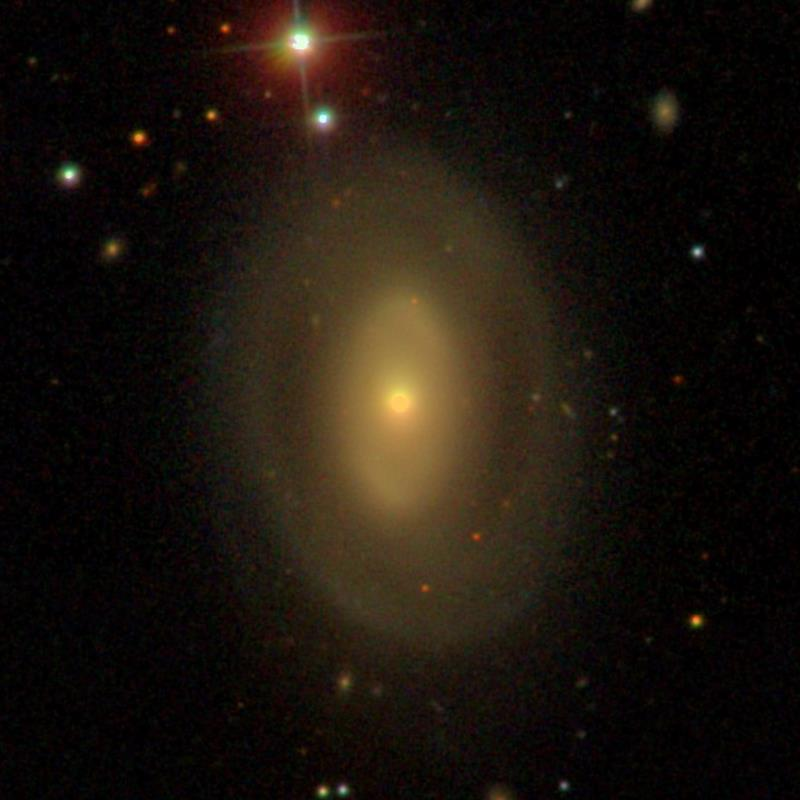
- NGC 2962 imaged by Sloan Digital Sky Survey

Observation data (J2000 epoch)
- Constellation: Hydra
- Right ascension: 09^{h} 40^{m} 53.9396^{s}
- Declination: +05° 09′ 57.025″
- Redshift: 0.006561 ± 0.000017
- Heliocentric radial velocity: 1,967 ± 5 km/s
- Distance: 109 ± 20.4 Mly (33.5 ± 6.2 Mpc)
- Group or cluster: NGC 2962 Group
- Apparent magnitude (V): 12.0

Characteristics
- Type: (R)SAB(rs)0+
- Size: ~93,000 ly (28.4 kpc) (estimated)
- Apparent size (V): 2.6′ × 1.9′

Other designations
- IRAS F09382+0523, UGC 5167, MCG +01-25-11, PGC 27635, CGCG 331-040

NGC 2962 is a lenticular galaxy in the constellation Hydra. The galaxy lies about 110 million light years away from Earth, which means, given its apparent dimensions, that NGC 2962 is approximately 90,000 light years across. It was discovered by Albert Marth on December 10, 1864.

== Characteristics ==
NGC 2962 is lenticular galaxy with two bars without a box shaped bulge. The galaxy also has two rings, an inner ring with major axis 0.93 arcminutes long and an outer ring with major axis 2.13 arcminutes long. The galaxy features a hydrogen disk, visible in HI, extending well beyond the optical radius of the galaxy.

The outer ring of NGC 2962 has low surface brightness and is created by tightly wound spiral arms which overlap while there are faint connections with the central region. There is no spiral pattern in the brighter, inner region of the galaxy. The outer ring is better visible in ultraviolet than the inner ring and contains about 5–8% of the stellar mass of the galaxy. Ultraviolet imaging by GALEX shows it is bluer than the rest of the galaxy and has spiral arms emerging from it. The ring corotates with the rest of the galaxy.

The galaxy has probably accreted gas from a companion galaxy, which has led to renewed star formation activity in the nucleus.

=== Supernova ===
One supernova has been observed in NGC 2962, SN 1995D. The supernova was discovered by Reiki Kushida in CCD images on 10 February 1995 at an apparent magnitude of 14.0, lying 11 arcseconds east and 90.5 arcseconds to the south of the centre of the galaxy. The galaxy was identified as a Type Ia supernova about a week before maximum.

== Nearby galaxies ==
NGC 2962 is the foremost galaxy of the NGC 2962 Group or LGG 178. Other members of the group include NGC 2966 and UGC 5107. A hydrogen bridge has been found to connect NGC 2962 with gas rich galaxy SDSS J094056.3+050240.5, lying 8 arcminutes away.
