= 6395 Hilliard =

Main-belt asteroid

Discovery
- Discovered by: Y. Kushida; O. Muramatsu
- Discovery site: Yatsugatake Obs.
- Discovery date: 21 October 1990

Designations
- Named after: Elizabeth and Leslie Hilliard (Herschel Museum of Astronomy)
- Alternative designations: 1990 UE_{1} · 1975 VU_{8} 1986 QX_{5}
- Minor planet category: main-belt · Nysa–Polana complex

Orbital characteristics
- Epoch 4 September 2017 (JD 2458000.5)
- Uncertainty parameter 0
- Observation arc: 67.17 yr (24,534 days)
- Aphelion: 2.8975 AU
- Perihelion: 1.9287 AU
- Semi-major axis: 2.4131 AU
- Eccentricity: 0.2007
- Orbital period (sidereal): 3.75 yr (1,369 days)
- Mean anomaly: 50.639°
- Mean motion: 0° 15^{m} 46.44^{s} / day
- Inclination: 1.4970°
- Longitude of ascending node: 227.68°
- Argument of perihelion: 179.25°

Physical characteristics
- Dimensions: 4.082±0.080 km 4.71 km (calculated)
- Geometric albedo: 0.20 (assumed); 0.351±0.018
- Spectral type: S
- Absolute magnitude (H): 13.7 · 14.0 · 14.03±0.25

6395 Hilliard, provisional designation 1990 UE_{1}, is a stony asteroid from the inner regions of the asteroid belt, approximately 4.5 kilometers in diameter.

It was discovered on 21 October 1990, by Japanese astronomers Yoshio Kushida and Osamu Muramatsu at Yatsugatake South Base Observatory, Japan. The asteroid was later named after the British philanthropic couple Elizabeth and Leslie Hilliard, donors of the Herschel Museum of Astronomy.

== Orbit and classification ==
It orbits the Sun in the inner main-belt at a distance of 1.9–2.9 AU once every 3 years and 9 months (1,369 days). Its orbit has an eccentricity of 0.20 and an inclination of 1° with respect to the ecliptic.

The asteroid was first found on a precovery image taken at Palomar Observatory in 1949. Its first used observations was taken at Crimea-Nauchnij in 1975, when it was identified as 1975 VU_{8}, extending the body's observation arc by 15 years prior to its official discovery observation at Yatsugatake.

== Physical characteristics ==
Pan-STARRS' photometric survey has characterized Hilliard as a common stony S-type asteroid.

According to the survey carried out by NASA's Wide-field Infrared Survey Explorer with its subsequent NEOWISE mission, Hilliard measures 4.082 kilometers in diameter and its surface has a high albedo of 0.351, while the Collaborative Asteroid Lightcurve Link assumes a standard albedo for stony asteroids of 0.20 and calculates a large diameter of 4.71 kilometers with on an absolute magnitude of 14.0, as diameter and albedo (reflectivity) are inversely related to each other.

=== Lightcurve ===
No rotational lightcurve of Hilliard has been obtained from photometric observations. In 2006, observations at the RHIT in Terre Haute, Indiana, United States, rendered no observable brightness variation. As of 2017, the body's rotation period and shape remain unknown.

== Naming ==
This minor planet was named in honor of Elizabeth (1903–2001) and Leslie Hilliard (1905–1997), donors of the Herschel Museum of Astronomy in Bath, England. The museum was formerly the home of astronomer William Herschel, from the garden of which he discovered the planet Uranus in 1781. The official naming citation was published on 9 September 1995 (M.P.C. 25655).
