= NGC 2595 =

Galaxy in the constellation Cancer

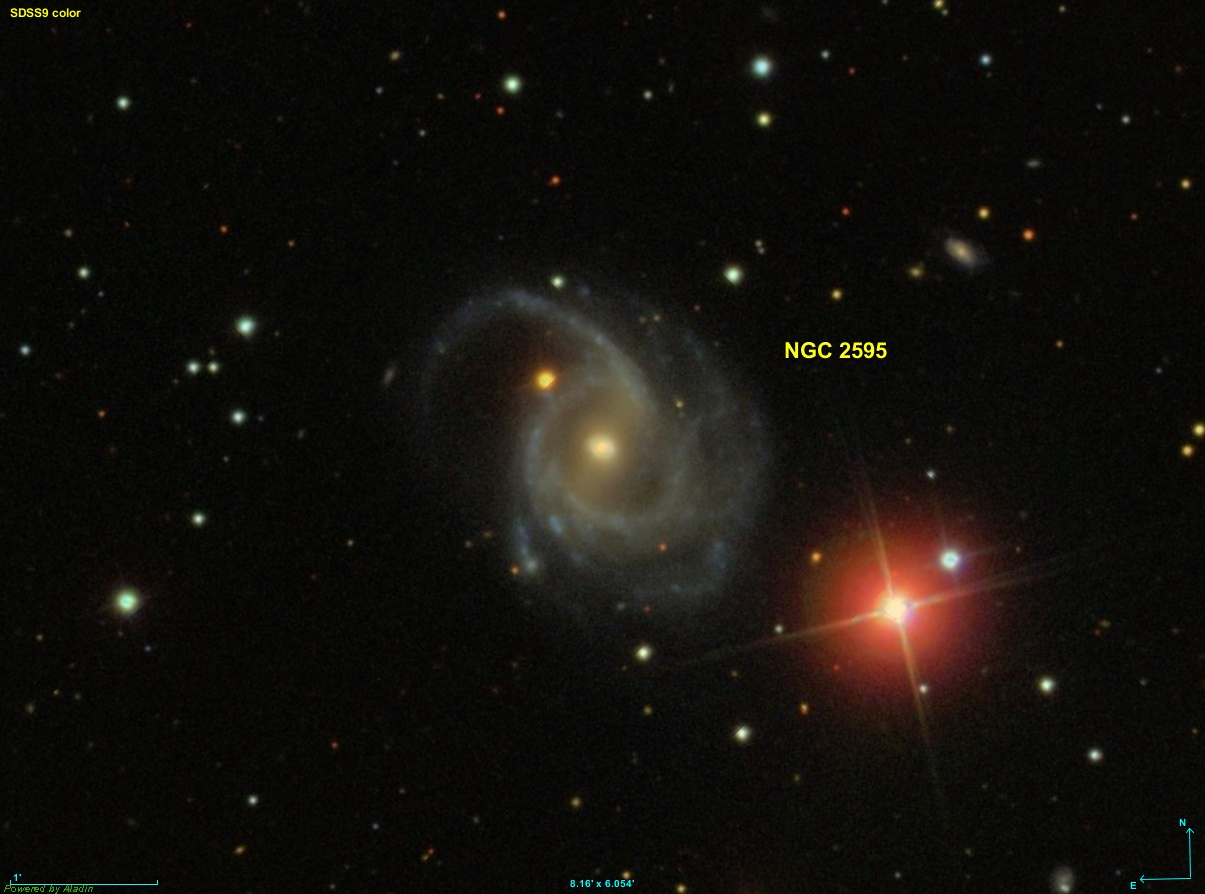
- NGC 2595 imaged by SDSS

Observation data (J2000 epoch)
- Constellation: Cancer
- Right ascension: 08^{h} 27^{m} 42.0377^{s}
- Declination: +21° 28′ 44.812″
- Redshift: 0.014457±0.000002
- Heliocentric radial velocity: 4,334±1 km/s
- Distance: 224.15 ± 11.85 Mly (68.725 ± 3.632 Mpc)
- Group or cluster: NGC 2595 group (LGG 159)
- Apparent magnitude (V): 13.7g

Characteristics
- Type: SAB(rs)c
- Size: ~211,100 ly (64.71 kpc) (estimated)
- Apparent size (V): 1.65′ × 1.33′

Other designations
- IRAS 08247+2138, 2MASX J08274198+2128447, UGC 4422, MCG +04-20-062, PGC 23725, CGCG 119-109

NGC 2595 is a spiral galaxy in the constellation of Cancer. Its velocity with respect to the cosmic microwave background is 4,576±17 km/s, which corresponds to a Hubble distance of 220.1 ± 15.4 Mly (67.49 ± 4.73 Mpc). This is in good agreement with 24 non-redshift measurements which give a distance of 224.15 ± 11.85 Mly (68.725 ± 3.632 Mpc). It was discovered by German-British astronomer William Herschel on 11 January 1787.

== NGC 2595 group ==
The galaxy NGC 2595 is the largest galaxy in a group of galaxies that bears its name. The NGC 2595 group (also known as LGG 159) includes at least 10 galaxies, including NGC 2582, NGC 2598, UGC 4386, UGC 4399, UGC 4400, and UGC 4424.

== Supernova ==
One supernova has been observed in NGC 2595: SN 1999aa (Type Ia-pec, mag. 15.5) was discovered by Ron Arbour, and independently by the Beijing Astronomical Observatory, on 11 February 1999, and by Reiki Kushida on 13 February 1999. This supernova was overluminous and exhibited one of the most slowly declining brightnesses known.

== See also ==
- List of NGC objects (2001–3000)
