= Sosui Ichikawa =

Sosui Ichikawa 市川 素水
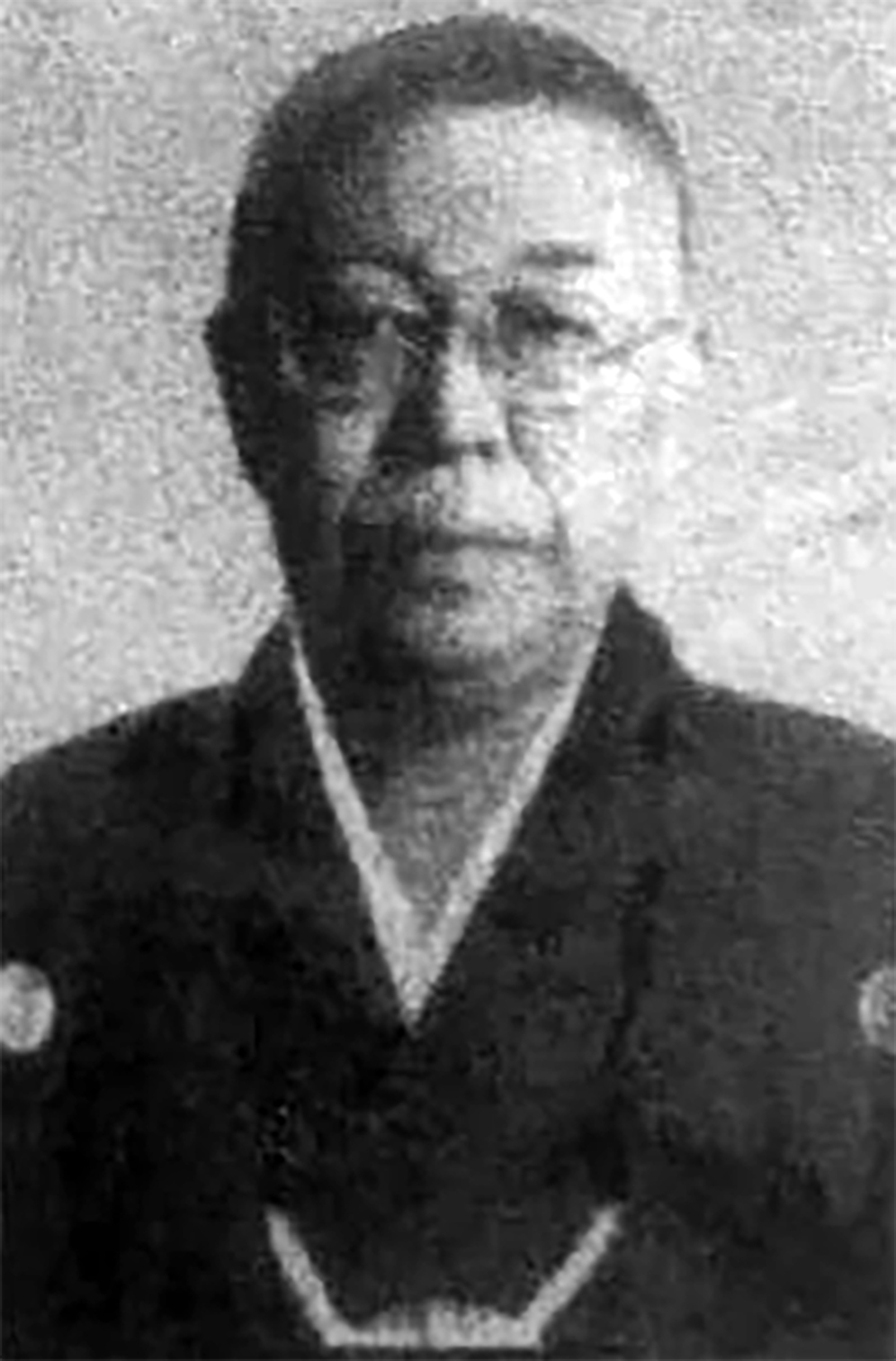
- Born: August 29, 1924; Ueno, Tokyo, Japan
- Died: March 7, 2005 (aged 80); Tokyo, Japan
- Organization(s): Sosuikan 素水館
- Style: Gōjū-ryū
- Title: 4th Sōke of the Zen Nihon Goju-ryu Karate-do Renmei 全日本剛柔流空手道連盟; Sosuikan Kancho ⻑館 館水素
- Predecessor: Kanki Izumigawa
- Successor: Kazunobu Tsubamoto 鍔本 和伸; Kenjiro Chiba 千葉 拳二郎 Martial arts career
- Teacher: Kanki Izumigawa
- Rank: 10th dan - Hanshi

Sosui Ichikawa (市川 素水; August 29, 1924 - March 7, 2005), was a Japanese martial artist born in Ueno, Tokyo, Japan who was the 4th Sōke of the Zen Nihon Goju-Ryu Karate-do Renmei (全日本剛柔流空手道連盟) and founder of the Sosuikan (素水館). He would teach Goju-Ryu karate while still doing his research and development. Ichikawa's studies were often focused on the Bubishi (武備志), and would ultimately come to write his texts, the Kōshu-do (交手道) and other documents. Sosui Ichikawa was accepted as Hanshi (範士), Jūdan (十段) in 1983 by the Okinawan Karate-Do Renmei.

== Biography ==
Sosui Ichikawa (市川 素水) was born in Ueno, Tokyo in 1924. He was drafted into the military and served in the Imperial Japanese Navy throughout World War II. Eventually, Ichikawa rose through the ranks and soon had the command of five men in his Anti-Aircraft Artillery Unit. Two Okinawan men in his unit were also students of Karate-do, when they were not engaged in naval duties during their time at sea together, he was able to learn karate from them while aboard a battleship. He returned to his parents' home in Ueno in Tokyo after the war ended and was relieved from his unit.

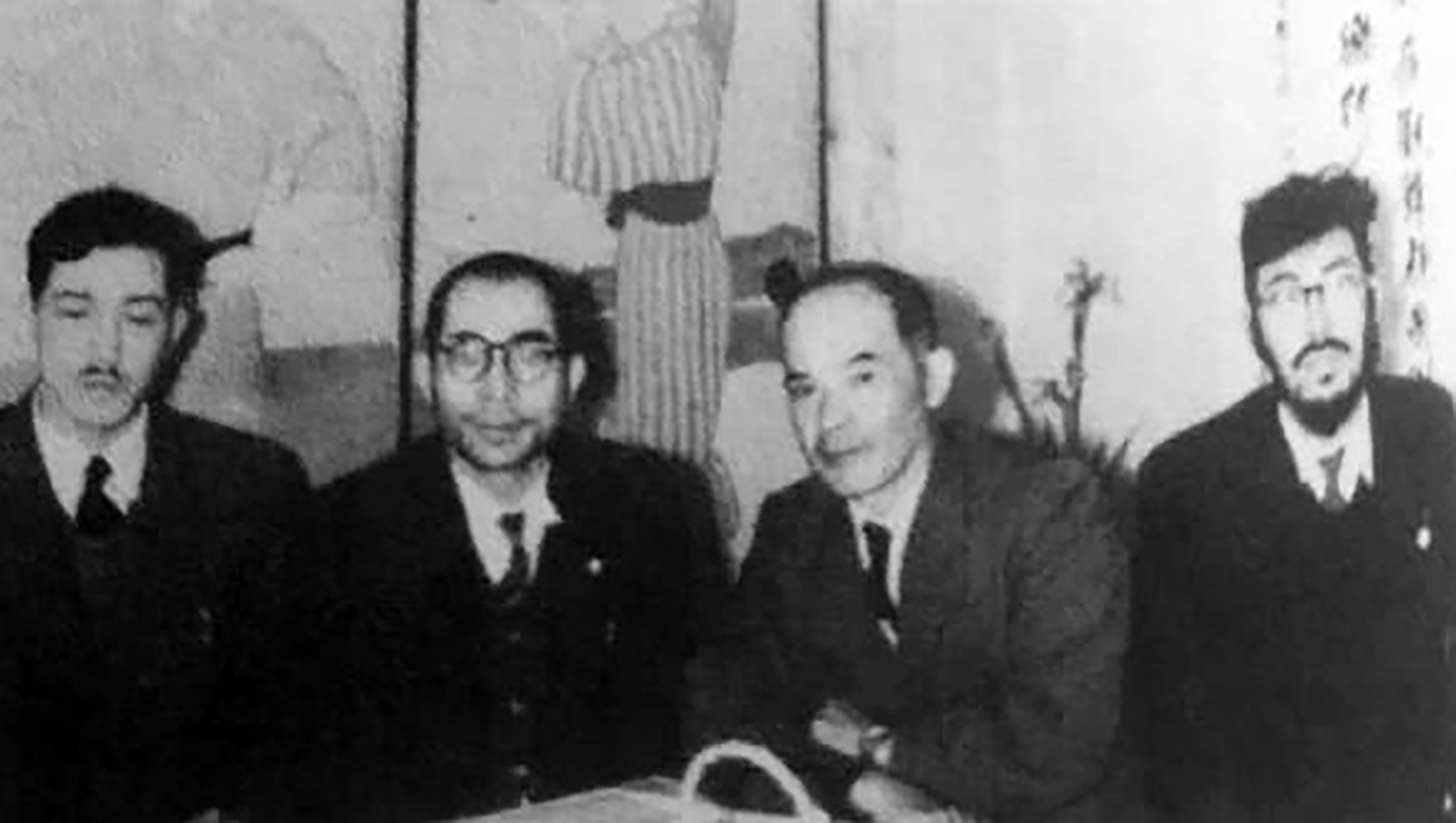
From left to right, Tsutomo Takato, Kinjo Hiroshi, Kanki Izumikawa, Sosui Ichikawa.

Japan's postwar situation was difficult due to the devastation that the country suffered during the war; since behind the Ichikawa residence rests an Inari shrine that hosted many festivals, Sosui was often called upon to deal with troublemakers and break up fights in the area. These situations were real training at work and the application of real Kumite. Since jobs became scarce, he kept himself occupied by learning karate on his own. He had looked for a martial arts instructor, but none of the local instructors would accept him as a student because of his fighting reputation.

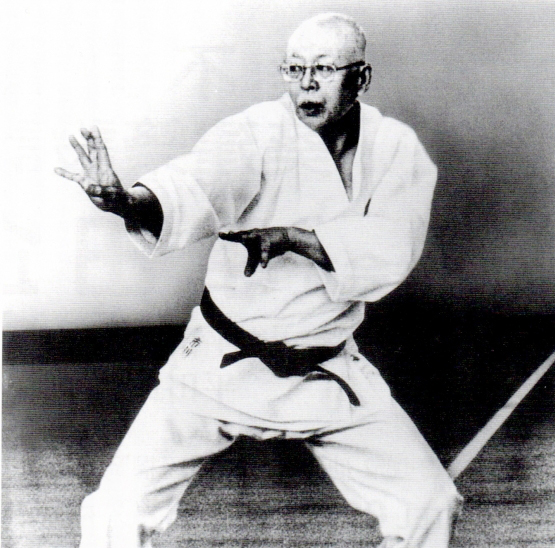
Sosui Ichikawa performing Suparinpei kata.

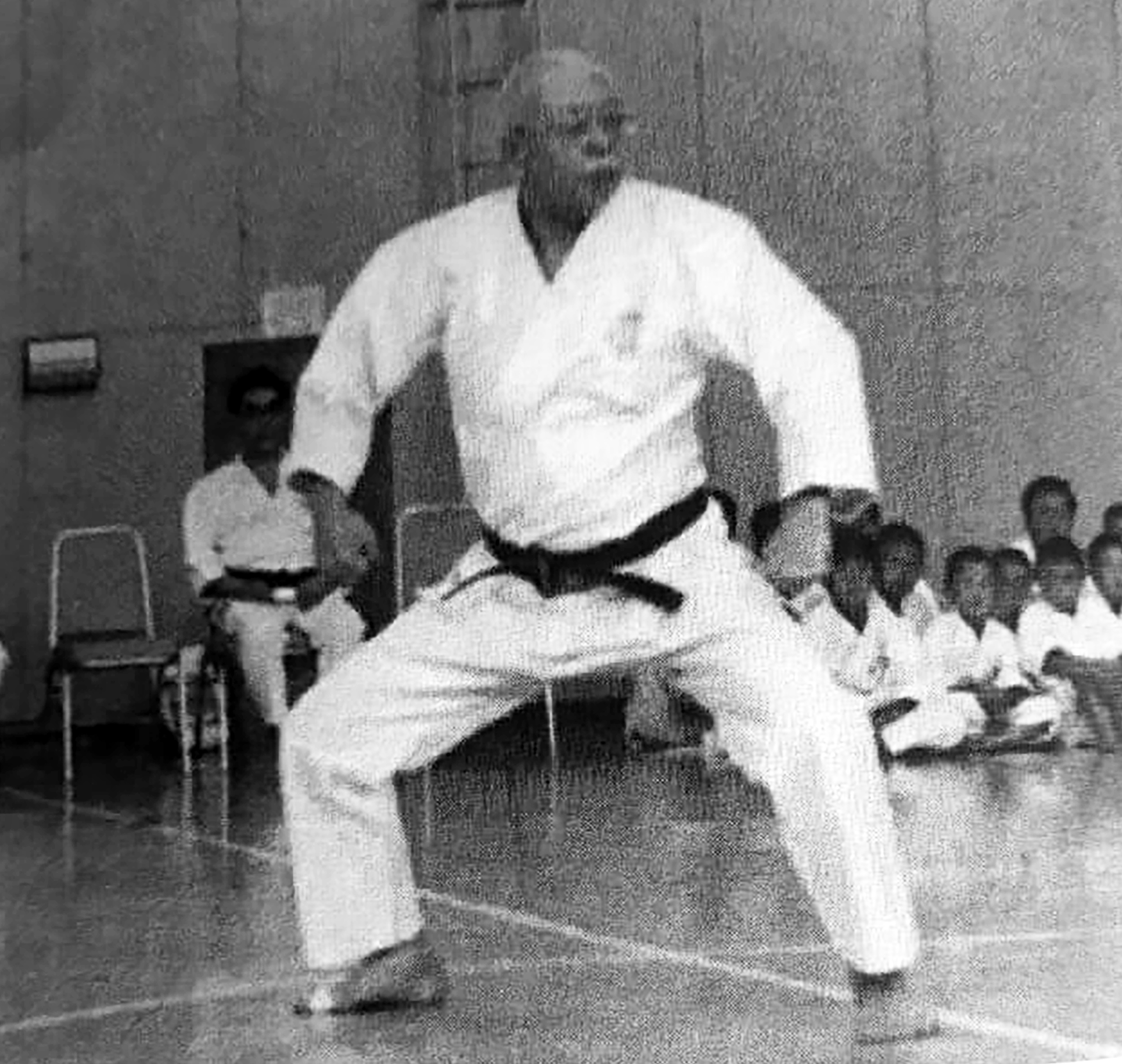
Sosui Ichikawa performing Suparimpei kata.

Ichikawa liked karate and art. At one point, he chose to pursue one and devote himself entirely to it, making his decision towards the learning of karate. With his commitment and dedication to Karate-do, Ichikawa continued looking for a suitable instructor to train with, and eventually heard of a dojo in Kawasaki that ran by Kanki Izumikawa (泉川 寛喜) from Okinawa; thus, Ichikawa decided to go to Kawasaki to see this instructor for himself. He requested to enter the organization immediately after he arrived, but before an answer was given, one of the senior students challenged Ichikawa to a fight. Ichikawa was able to defeat him in their sparring match. With that, he was admitted as Kanki Izumikawa's student. Izumikawa was a top student of Sekō (Seiko) Higa (比嘉 世幸) who trained directly with Naha-te master Kanryō Higashionna (東恩納 寛量) and the founder of Goju-Ryu Karate-do Chōjun Miyagi (宮城 長順).

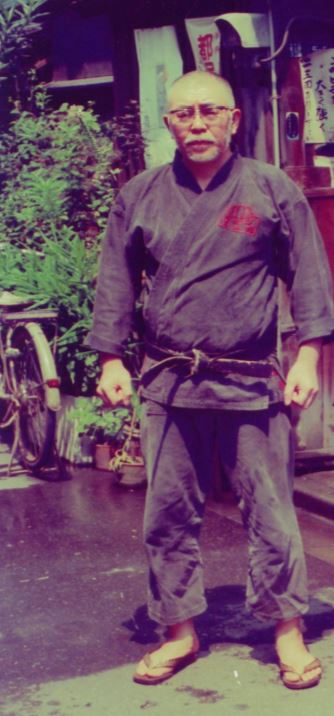
Full body portrait of Sosui Ichikawa.

Ichikawa devoted more than a decade studying under Kanki Izumikawa. In 1951, Ichikawa was authorized to open his dojo, which he called Sosuikan (素水館) after his first name. Ichikawa grew the number of students within a brief time when he first began teaching; therefore, classes had to be, temporarily, taught in a nearby park. Sosui would travel back and forth from Tokyo to Kawasaki to continue his training with Izumikawa. Ichikawa studied obsessively and dedicated himself to mastering karate. He did not stop until he had fully understood a technique. Sosui was very tall for a Japanese man (6" feet tall); he used his big frame to overpower his rivals and was known as the Senbukan's fiercest fighter. Kanki Izumikawa finally promoted him to 6th dan and gave him the Bubishi with Izumikawa's handprint to recognize him as the formal successor.

Sosui Ichikawa would teach the Goju-Ryu he learned from Izumikawa at the Sosuikan (素水館) dojo while still doing his own research and development. Ichikawa's Goju-Ryu evolved into his style over time. The studies were often focused on the Bubishi (武備志), which is regarded as one of the most important texts in Goju-Ryu and Karate. Sosui Ichikawa also emphasized the importance of Kumite in comprehending the essence of Goju- Ryu. Ichikawa would ultimately come to write his text, the Kōshu-do (交手道), which was only handed to the most senior students, and it represented the culmination of his lifetime of study. The Koshudo is considered to be an extension of the Bubishi. The Bubishi with Ichikawa's handprint was issued to those who had mastered the whole system and were recognized as the style's successors, usually around 6th dan. The study of the Bubishi was regarded as extremely important; so much so that in reality, sometimes the successors refer to themselves as the Bubishi lineage.

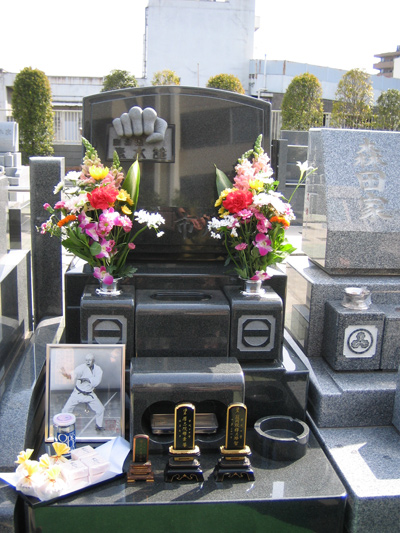
Sosui Ichikawa's resting place at Takashimadaira Cemetery in Misono, Itabashi-ku, Tokyo.

The Okinawan Karate-Do Renmei accepted Sosui Ichikawa as Hanshi (範士), Jūdan (十段) in 1983, with Yuchoku Higa (比嘉 佑直) issuing the certificate. Yuchoku Higa was one of Ichikawa's few confidantes. Later, Ichikawa founded the All-Japan Goju-Ryu Karate-do Renmei. Ichikawa's teachings stressed the notion that a smaller, weaker individual should be able to defeat a bigger, more powerful one. Ichikawa was also a strict perfectionist. He believed that even the slightest error in technique could be the difference between life and death. Ichikawa Sensei also studied and practiced other styles, including Daitō-ryū Jujutsu (大東流 柔術) and Jūdō (柔道), and held dan ranks in both. Due to his expertise in martial arts, other masters from other styles such as Ninjitsu instructor Masaaki Hatsumi, Okinawan Goju instructor Meitoku Yagi, and Shotokan instructor Hirokazu Kanazawa would go to the Sosuikan dojo to discuss concepts.

As a result of his research, he expanded beyond the Sekō Higa (比嘉 世幸) lineage of Goju-Ryu and created many of his unique techniques and concepts. Consequently, the Ichikawa lineage differs from the Shodokan (尚道館) and Senbukan (仙武館) Goju-Ryu.

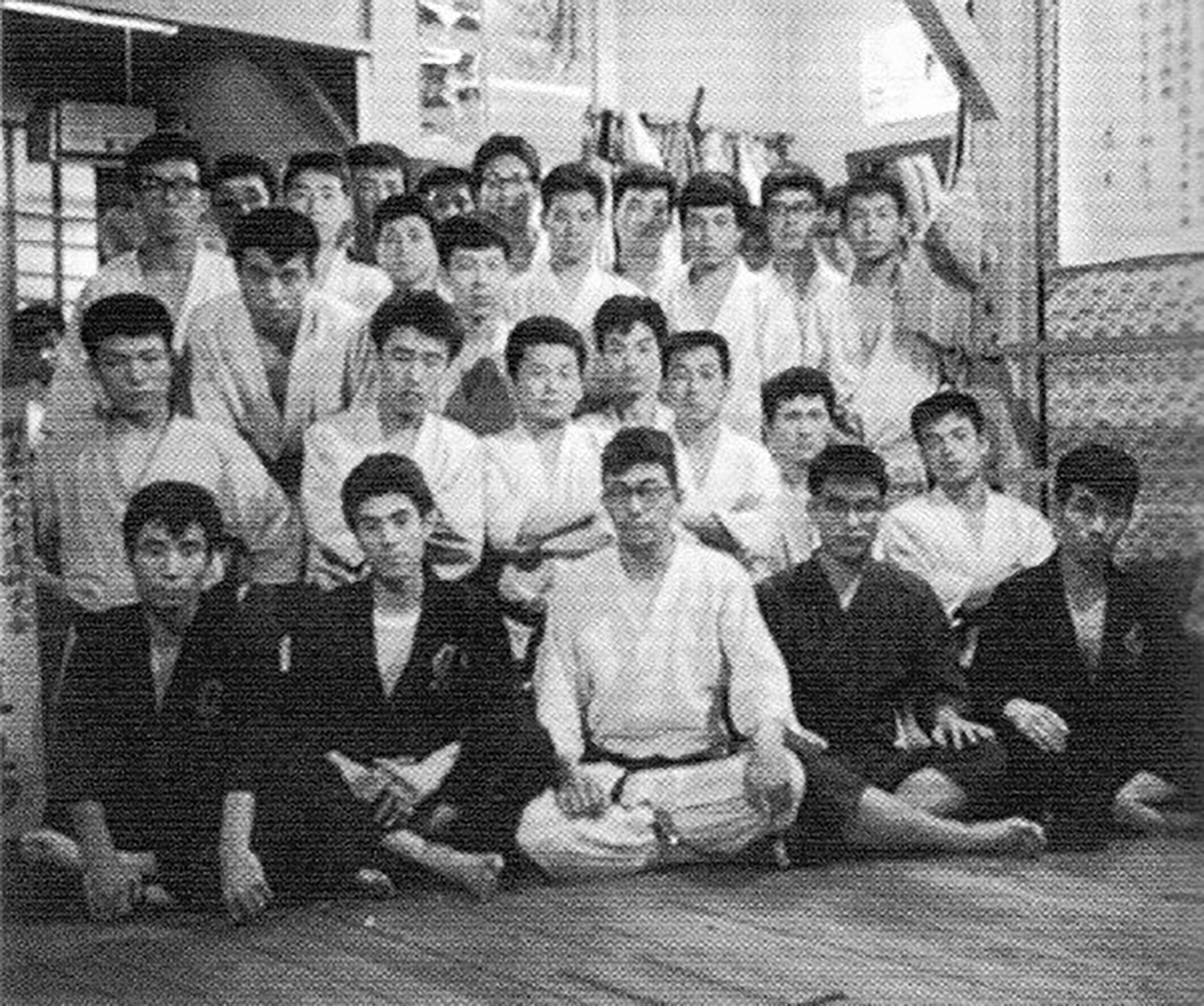
Sosui Ichikawa with his students at the Sosuikan dojo.

Despite his lack of international recognition, Ichikawa was regarded by other masters as a great practitioner of Goju-Ryu in Japan. His senior students are among the few instructors who continue to practice the traditional ways of Goju-Ryu karate on mainland Japan.

Sosui Ichikawa died in 2005. His resting place is at Takashimadaira Cemetery in Misono, Itabashi-ku, Tokyo.
