= Shun-ei Izumikawa =

Japanese astronomer

Minor planets discovered: 2
5239 Reiki	November 14, 1990	MPC^{[1]}
27748 Vivianhoette	January 9, 1991	MPC^{[1]}
^{1} with O. Muramatsu

Shun-ei Izumikawa (泉川 俊英, Izumikawa Shun'ei) is a Japanese astronomer and co-discoverer of 5239 Reiki and 27748 Vivianhoette, two main-belt asteroids he first observed together with astronomer Osamu Muramatsu at the Yatsugatake South Base Observatory (896) near Hokuto, Yamanashi, in 1990 and 1991.

The asteroids were named for Japanese amateur astronomer Reiki Kushida and American Vivian Hoette from the U.S. Yerkes Observatory, respectively.
