= 8187 Akiramisawa =

Main-belt asteroid

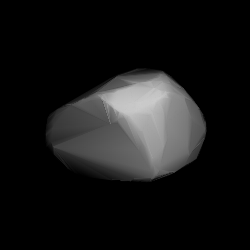
- Akiramisawa modeled from its lightcurve

Discovery
- Discovered by: S. Otomo
- Discovery site: Kiyosato Obs. (894)
- Discovery date: 15 December 1992

Designations
- Named after: Akira Misawa (Japanese botanist)
- Alternative designations: 1992 XL · 1971 UF_{4} 1971 VV
- Minor planet category: main-belt · (outer); Eos

Orbital characteristics
- Epoch 4 September 2017 (JD 2458000.5)
- Uncertainty parameter 0
- Observation arc: 44.79 yr (16,358 days)
- Aphelion: 3.3523 AU
- Perihelion: 2.6219 AU
- Semi-major axis: 2.9871 AU
- Eccentricity: 0.1223
- Orbital period (sidereal): 5.16 yr (1,886 days)
- Mean anomaly: 351.90°
- Mean motion: 0° 11^{m} 27.24^{s} / day
- Inclination: 11.608°
- Longitude of ascending node: 83.066°
- Argument of perihelion: 277.60°

Physical characteristics
- Mean diameter: 11.86 km (calculated)
- Synodic rotation period: 5.8153±0.0015 h
- Geometric albedo: 0.057 (assumed)
- Spectral type: C (assumed)
- Absolute magnitude (H): 12.8 · 13.45±0.27 · 12.908±0.007 (R) · 13.36

8187 Akiramisawa, provisional designation 1992 XL, is an Eos asteroid from the outer region of the asteroid belt. It was discovered by Japanese astronomer Satoru Otomo at Kiyosato Observatory (894) on 15 December 1992. The assumed C-type asteroid has a rotation period of 5.8 hours and measures approximately 12 kilometers (7.5 miles) in diameter. It was named after Japanese botanist Akira Misawa (1942–1994).

== Orbit and classification ==
Akiramisawa is a member the Eos family (606), the largest asteroid family of the outer main belt consisting of nearly 10,000 known members. It orbits the Sun in the outer asteroid belt at a distance of 2.6–3.4 AU once every 5 years and 2 months (1,886 days). Its orbit has an eccentricity of 0.12 and an inclination of 12° with respect to the ecliptic. In October 1971, it was first identified as 1971 UF_{4} at the Chilean Cerro El Roble Station, extending the body's observation arc by 21 years prior to its official discovery observation at Kiyosato.

== Naming ==
This minor planet was named in honour of Japanese botanist Akira Misawa (1942–1994), a professor at Chiba University, who examined the effects of light pollution on plants. The official naming citation was published by the Minor Planet Center on 9 January 2001 (M.P.C. 41935).

== Physical characteristics ==
A rotational lightcurve of Akiramisawa was obtained from photometric observations made at the Palomar Transient Factory in June 2010. Lightcurve analysis gave a rotation period of 5.8153±0.0015 hours with a high brightness amplitude of 0.90 magnitude (U=2). The Collaborative Asteroid Lightcurve Link assumes a standard albedo for carbonaceous asteroids of 0.057, and calculates a diameter of 11.9 kilometers with an absolute magnitude of 13.36.
