= Herschel Museum of Astronomy =

Museum in Bath, Somerset, England

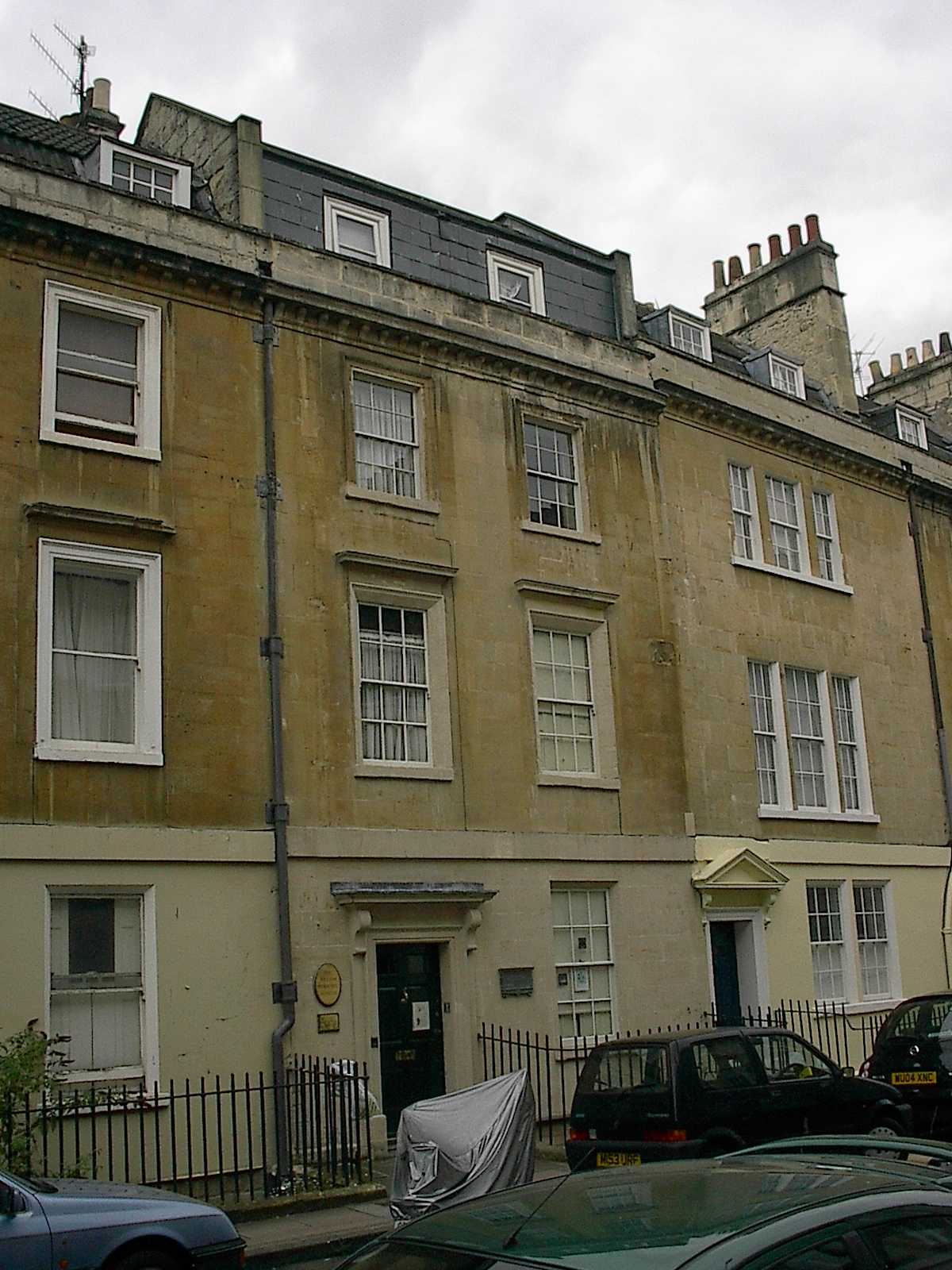
- The front of the Herschel Museum of Astronomy in 2005

- Location within Somerset and the United Kingdom
- Established: 13 March 1981
- Location: 19 New King Street, Bath, BA1 2BL
- Coordinates: 51.3825°N 2.366944°W
- Owners: Herschel House Trust (Bath Preservation Trust)
- Parking: Disabled parking slot outside building
- Website: herschelmuseum.org.uk

The Herschel Museum of Astronomy at 19 New King Street, Bath, England, is a museum that was inaugurated in 1981. It is located in a town house that was formerly the home of William Herschel and his sister Caroline.

== Location ==
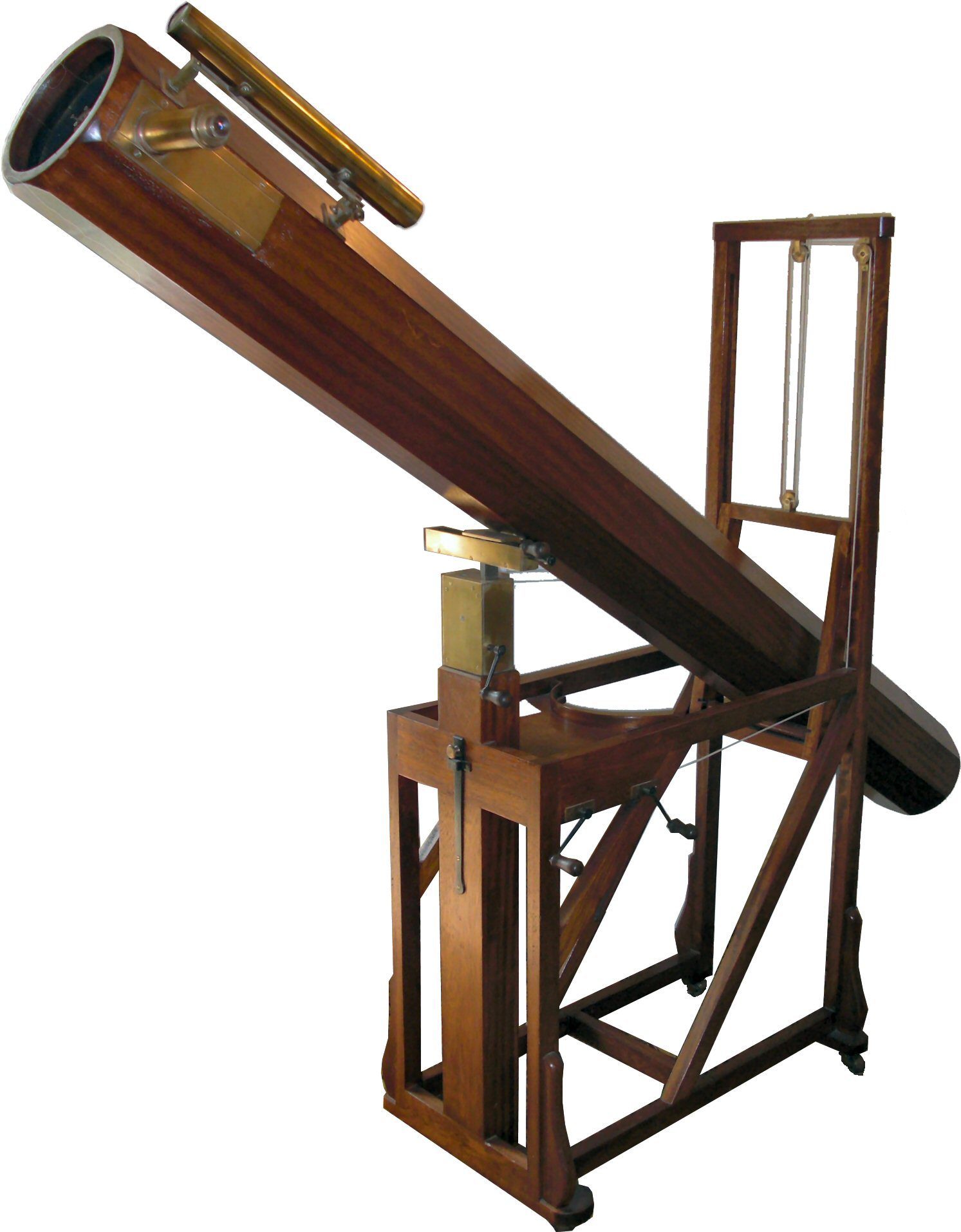
Replica of a telescope similar to that with which William Herschel discovered Uranus

The museum is situated in the former home of the Herschels at 19 New King Street (south side) in Bath, England. The building is a particularly well-preserved small town house of the period. The modest town-house covers five floors, and includes two reception rooms on the ground and first floor. The town house is part of a terrace that was built around 1764-1770. The building is constructed from Bath stone ashlar, with some coursed rubble at the rear, and slate Mansard roofs with pantiling on the internal slopes. The entrance is on the left-hand side of the building, which has three storeys, as well as an attic and basement, each of which have two sash windows. The building represents a middle-grade Georgian town house, typical of the homes of artisans and tradesmen of the city of Bath (but contrasting with Bath's grand visitor houses)

The Herschels moved into 19 New King Street in 1777, at which point the builders would have still been present, and the road would have been unmetalled. William discovered Uranus whilst residing in the house in March 1781 using a 7 foot telescope designed and built in the attached workshop. William left Bath in 1782, but Caroline, along with their brother Alexander, remained at the house until 1784.

The building has been designated by English Heritage as a grade II* listed building. The building was restored in 1981, and again in 2000, using period detailed wallpaper based on fragments discovered in other Bath houses, and carpets based on 18th-century designs.

== Museum ==
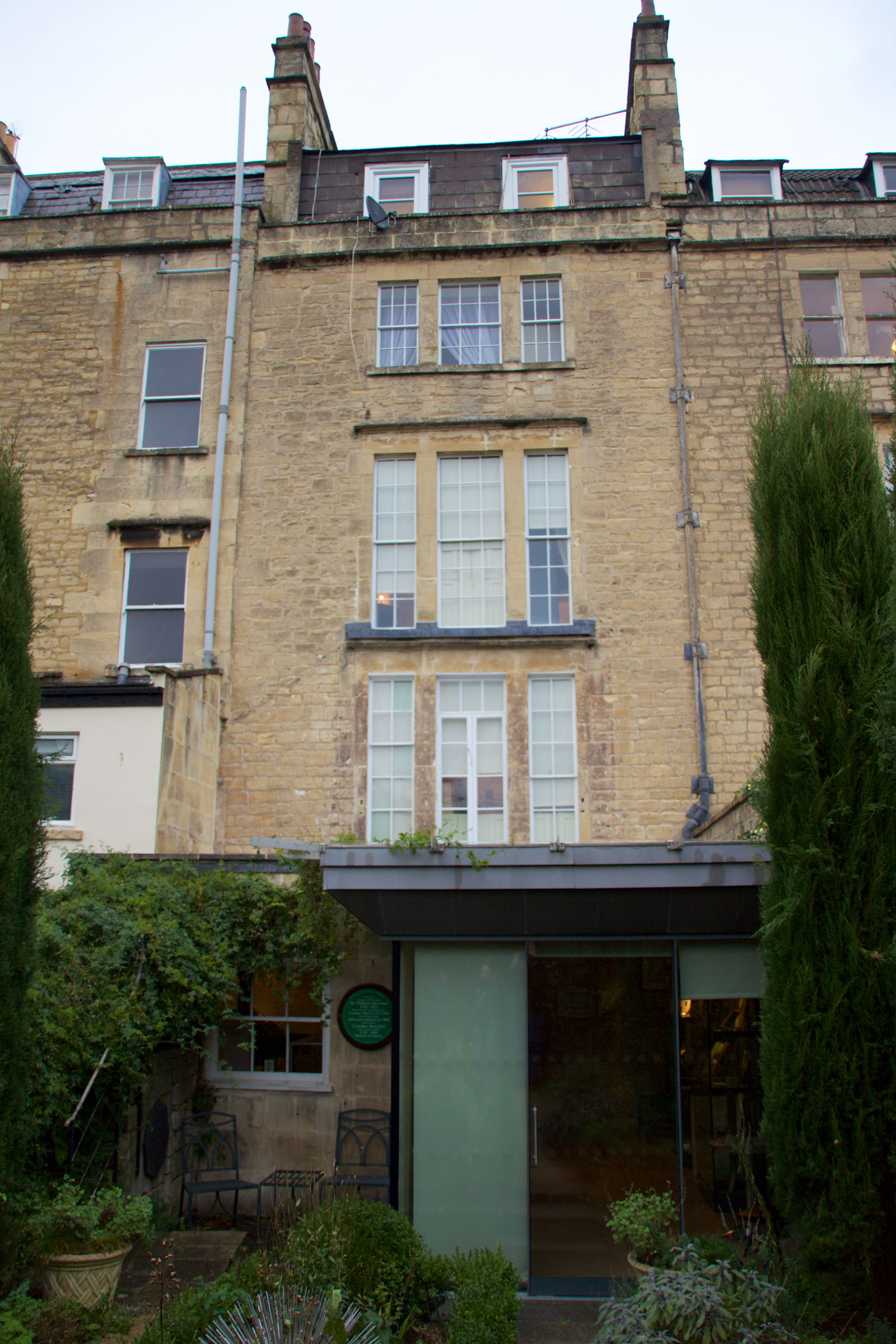
The rear of the building

In 1977 the William Herschel Society was set up to gather support for the rescue of the building. It was purchased in 1981 with the aid of Doctors Leslie and Elizabeth Hilliard, saving it from demolition. The main-belt asteroid 6395 Hilliard was later named in their honor. The house was subsequently transferred as a donation to the Herschel House Trust. The museum was opened on 13 March 1981, exactly 200 years after Herschel discovered Uranus. The museum is governed by the Herschel House Trust, a registered charity. The Bath Preservation Trust became the sole trustee of the Herschel House Trust in July 2015. The patrons of the museum have been Patrick Moore (until 2012) and Brian May (from December 2013).

The museum offers audio tours. A virtual tour of the museum is available for mobility-impaired visitors, and a book containing tactile images is available for blind or partially sighted visitors. A disabled parking space is located outside of the building. Replica objects in the museum, including a replica of Herschel's polishing machine, are designed to be handled. The museum uses QR codes to provide translations of the display exhibit labels in 10 different languages, and illustrated trails are available from the shop. The museum has a school programme and workshop.

== Layout and contents ==
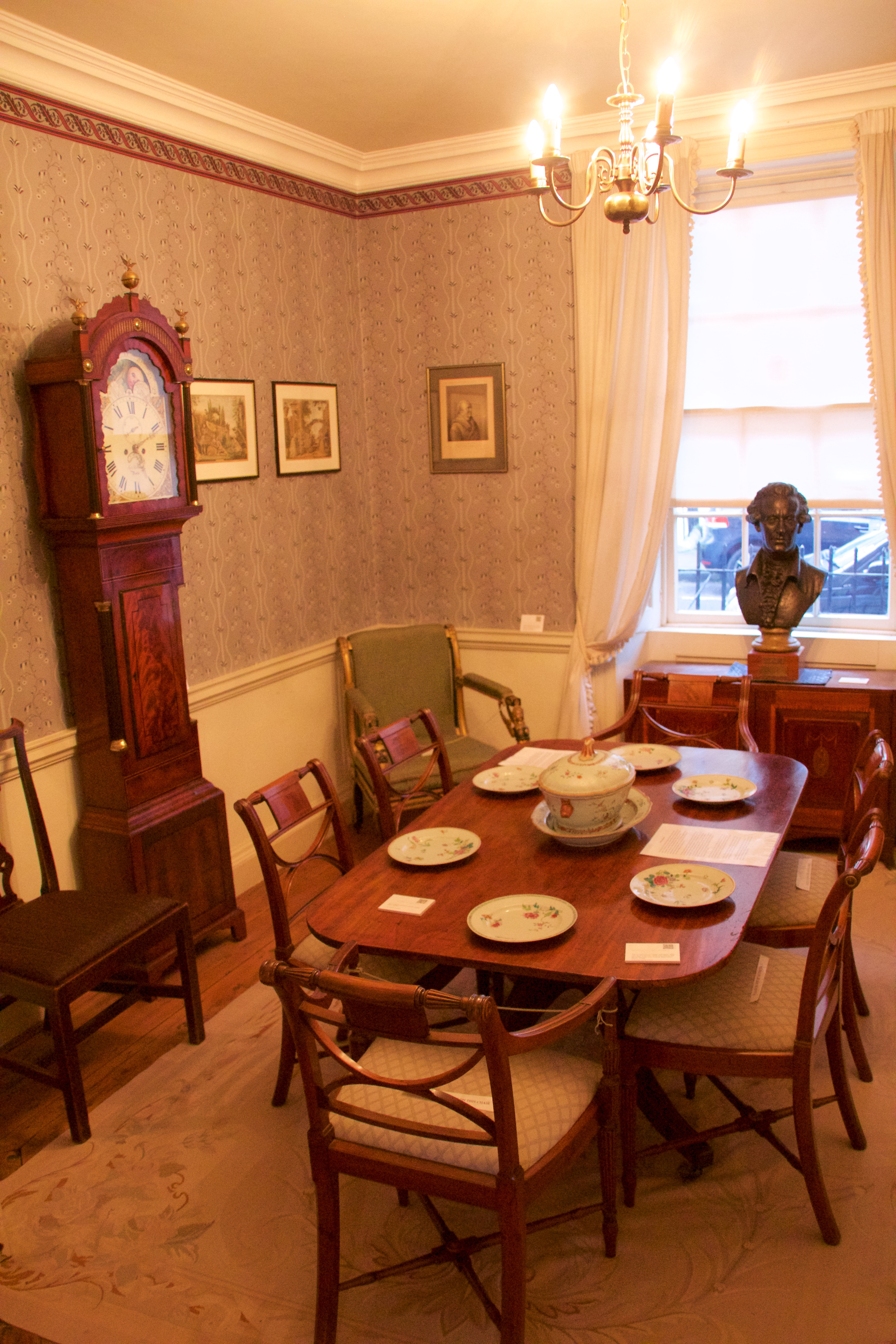
The dining room

The basement contains a kitchen, parlour and workshop. At ground floor, the building has an entrance hall with a staircase, a small closet room that is used as a dining room, and a large south-facing room at the back of the house. Similar south-facing rooms are present at each level of the building. The dining room contains Herschel's dining table. On the first floor, the Music Room occupies the closet room, and the south-facing room is the Drawing Room. The upper floors provided bedrooms and servant quarters; they have subsequently been converted into flats.

=== Kitchen ===
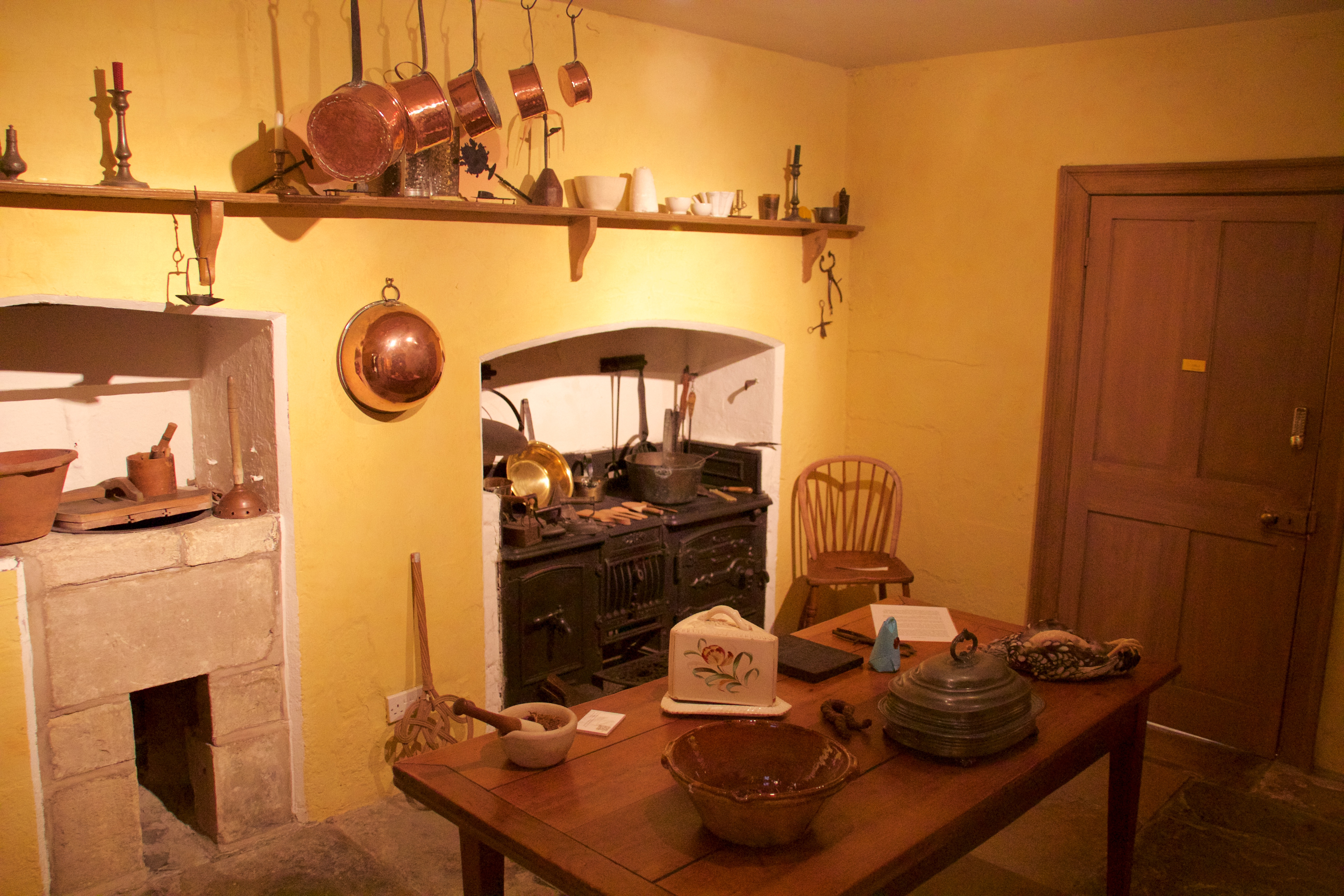
The kitchen

The kitchen incorporates a Victorian cast iron range and a stone flag floor. It contains a replica Georgian house based on the museum's building, which is fully furnished inside.

=== Workshop ===
William built a single-storey workshop at the rear of the basement, extending into the garden; he used the workshop to conduct experiments and to construct his lenses, and it still contains Herschel's treadle lathe. The workshop, adjacent to the kitchen, was where William and Alexander made their telescopes. It contains a replica furnace, and a replica of William's machine for polishing lenses, the original of which is in the Science Museum, London; the replica polishing machine has been designed to be handled, and a touchscreen computer demonstrates the tools and machinery in the workshop.

=== Caroline Lucretia Gallery ===
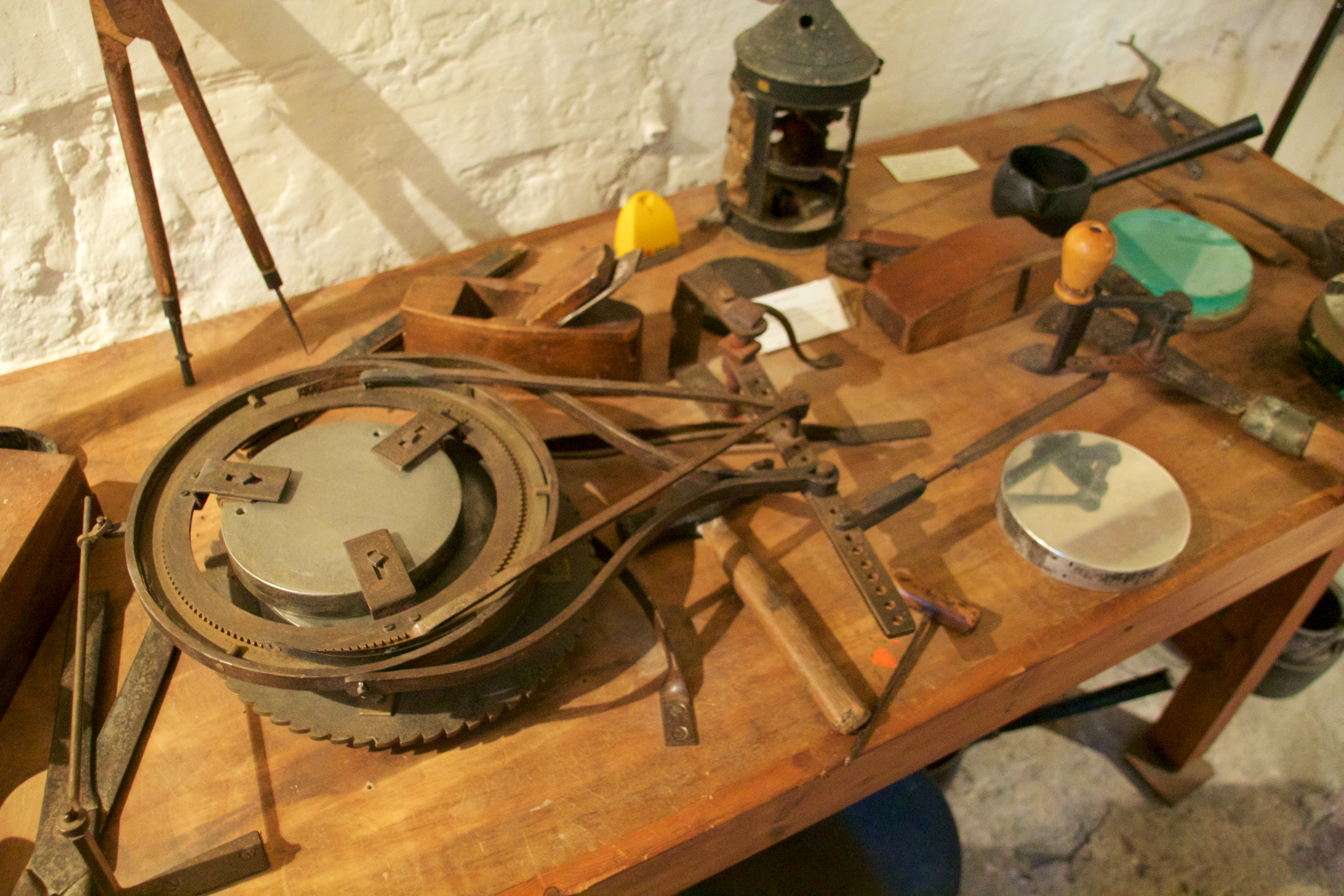
Replica of William's mirror-polisher in his workshop

The Caroline Lucretia Gallery, named after Caroline Herschel, was added to the museum in 2011. The gallery was designed by Hetreed Ross Architects, and is of a modern design, with floor-to-ceiling glazing, overhanging eaves and a flat stainless steel stressed skin roof, with the solid walls constructed of Bath Stone Ashlar to match the rest of the building. Inside, two walls are the former outer walls of the kitchen and workshop, and the other two consist of display panels. The limestone slab floor is insulated and heated. It cost £80,000, which was raised via a 2-year funding campaign, after planning permission was approved in 2008. It received a prize for building and design from the Bath and North East Somerset Building Control Department.

The gallery expanded the available space at the museum, and is used for temporary exhibitions. In August–December 2013 the exhibition was on the art and science of light in the 18th century, entitled "Making light of it", and in April–December 2014 it was on Caroline Herschel, entitled "Being Caroline - A Second Self". In August–December 2015 the temporary exhibit was "Waterloo and The March of Science".

=== Auditorium ===
The "Star Vault Astronomy auditorium", opened in 2003, shows a short film about the Herschels, their life living at 19 New King Street, and modern space exploration, narrated by Patrick Moore.

=== Garden ===
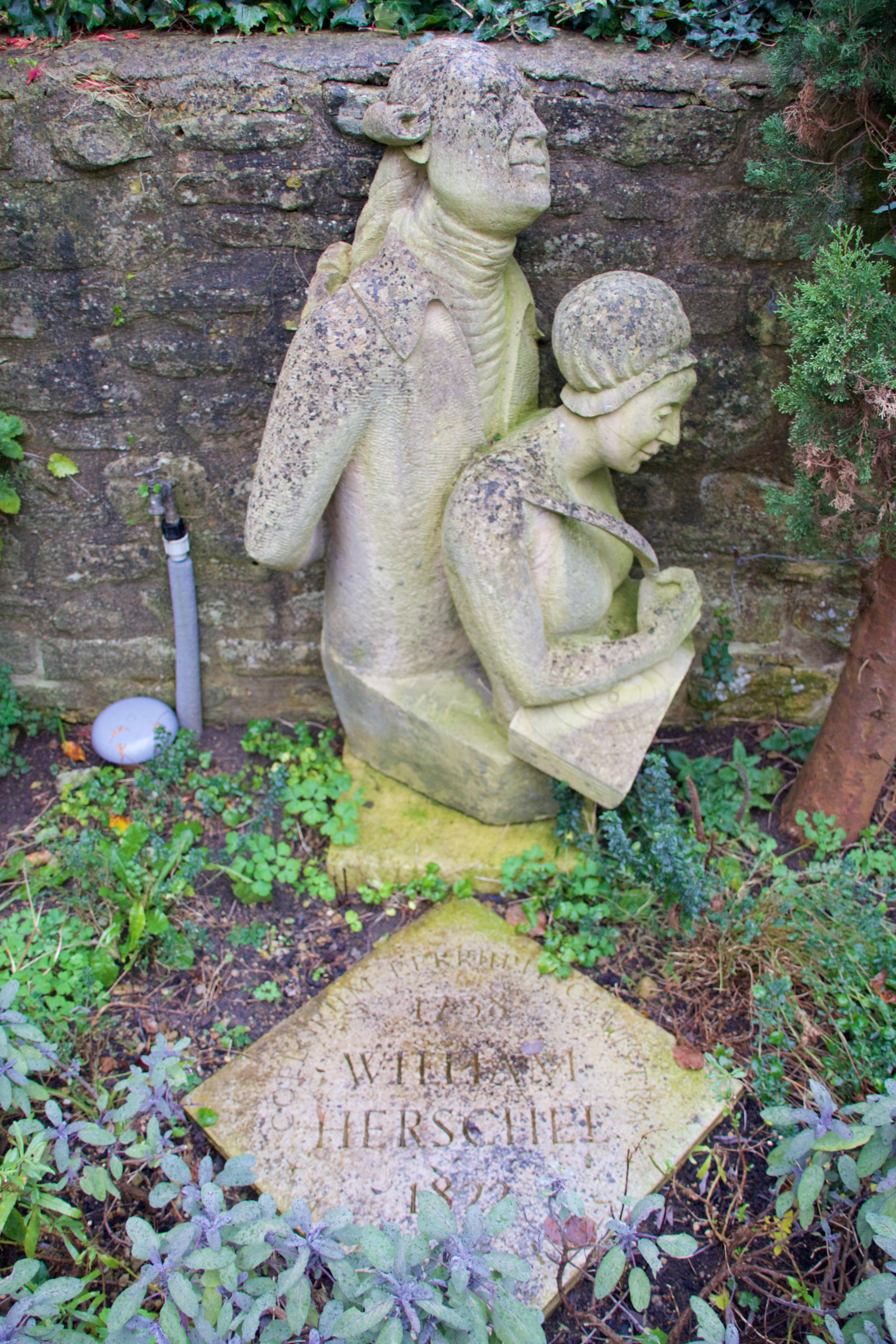
The sculpture of William and Caroline in the garden

The garden has been restored in the style of a formal Georgian town garden, with cypress trees and a quince arbour, as well as native medicinal and culinary plants that would have been grown in 1794.

A 1.25 m (4.1 ft) diameter powder-coated steel seed head by Ruth Moilliet represents Uranus's position in the 2005 Spaced Out model of the Solar System, which spanned the UK with the Sun at Jodrell Bank Observatory.

A 1.54 m × 0.72 m (5.1 ft × 2.4 ft) sculpture of William and Caroline, named Star Gazers by Vivien Moudell, sits against the garden wall close to the entrance to the workshop. Made of Bath stone and slate, it was unveiled in 1988 by Patrick Moore and Rod Davies. It shows William dressed in a wig, jacket and ruffled shirt, behind Caroline, in a bonnet and holding a quill pen, looking at a piece of paper showing a drawing of the solar system with Uranus at the centre. An octagonal slate panel was set above their heads, engraved with planetary orbits.

The garden also contains a sundial at the location where William may have placed his telescope.

=== Music Room ===
The Music Room was used by William to teach pupils how to play music. It contains a single action pedal harp, commissioned by Mademoiselle Henriette Peyrot-Magenest in 1795, made by George Cousineau and son Jacques-Georges Cousineau, and purchased by the museum in 2012. The harp is carved and decorated in Rococo style with scrolling leaves, flowers and garlands, and a soundboard decorated with classical arabesques.

The music room also contains a modern sculpture of an orrery, created in 2009 and based on the 18th-century brass drum orrery held at the museum.

=== Collections ===
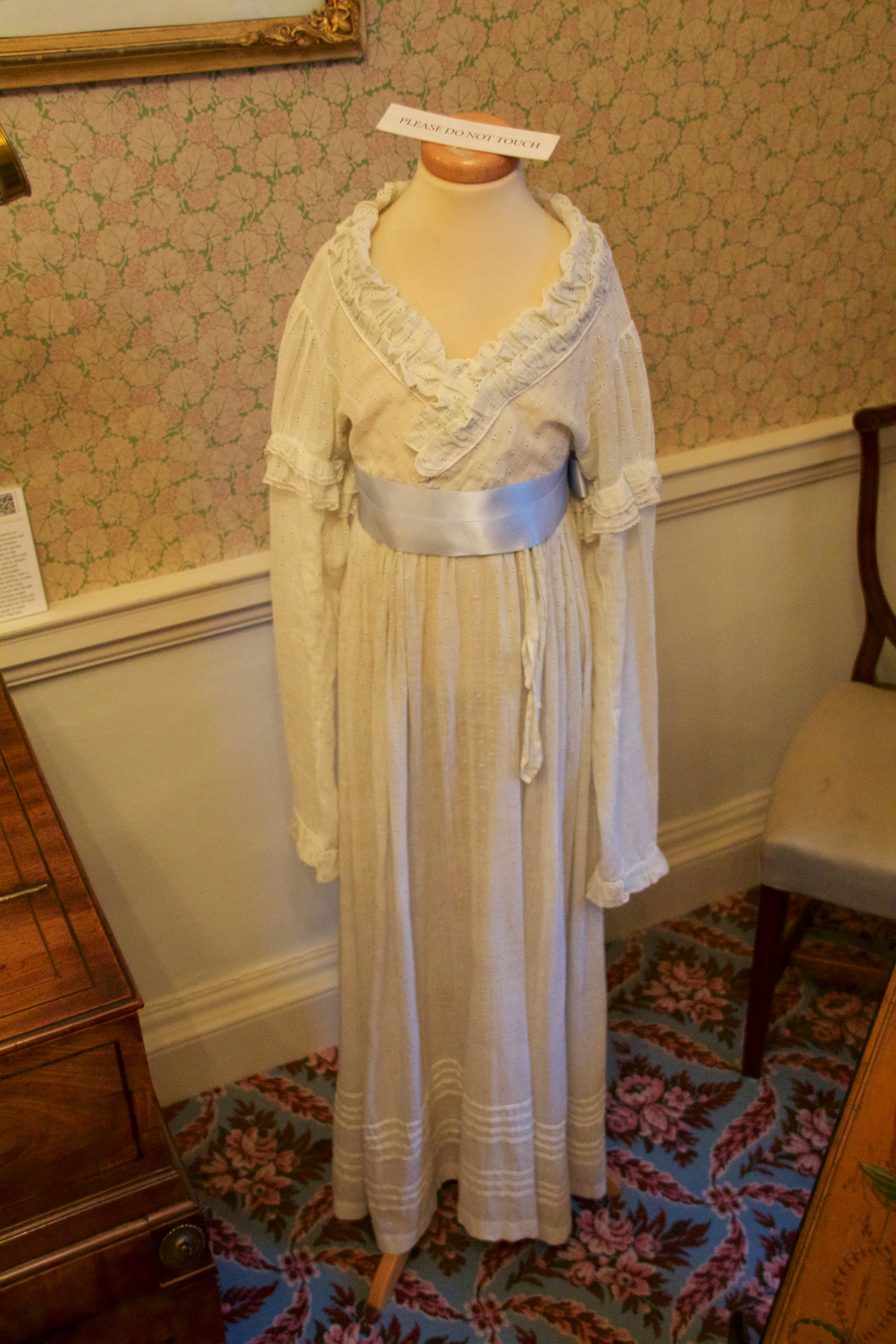
Caroline's dress on display at the museum

The museum holds a small dress worn by Caroline when she was around 50. It is made from white muslin with a blue spot and dates from the last years of the 18th century. The museum also has a Thomas Butterfield sundial, dating from c.1690, made of silver in the shape of a bird, with names of European cities and their latitudes on the back; a Copernican Armillary sphere by George Delamarche, made of brass, wood and paper, and with Herschel's name and Uranus on one outer ring; a Cometarium showing the motion of a comet on its path around the Sun, on loan from the Science Museum; and paintings of Elizabeth Baldwin by Robert Muller (pre-1798) and John Herschel (1892).

A scale model of the 40-foot telescope, as well as an early photo of it that is framed in wood from the telescope, is on display at the museum. Additionally, several rare books, including Caroline's visitor book, can be viewed on a computer.

In 2015 it was announced that the museum will house Patrick Moore's collection of objects related to William Herschel.
