= 147P/Kushida–Muramatsu =

Periodic comet

Discovery
- Discovered by: Yoshio Kushida; Osamu Muramatsu
- Discovery site: Yatsugatake, Japan
- Discovery date: 8 December 1993

Designations
- MPC designation: P/1993 X1; P/2000 T2
- Alternative designations: 1993 XIX, 1993t

Orbital characteristics
- Epoch: 17 October 2024 (JD 2460600.5)
- Observation arc: 22.09 years
- Earliest precovery date: 7 December 1993
- Number of observations: 290
- Aphelion: 4.859 AU
- Perihelion: 3.159 AU
- Semi-major axis: 4.009 AU
- Eccentricity: 0.21196
- Orbital period: 8.03 years
- Inclination: 2.312°
- Longitude of ascending node: 91.667°
- Argument of periapsis: 348.57°
- Mean anomaly: 38.623°
- Last perihelion: 6 December 2023
- Next perihelion: 19 December 2031
- T_{Jupiter}: 3.011
- Earth MOID: 1.769 AU
- Jupiter MOID: 0.429 AU

Physical characteristics
- Dimensions: 0.42 km (0.26 mi)
- Synodic rotation period: 10.5±0.1 hours
- Comet total magnitude (M1): 13.6
- Comet nuclear magnitude (M2): 16.7

147P/Kushida–Muramatsu is a quasi-Hilda comet discovered in 1993 by Japanese astronomers Yoshio Kushida and Osamu Muramatsu. It was last observed in 2016 and will next come to perihelion on 19 December 2031.

== Observational history ==
The comet was discovered photographically by Yoshio Kushida and Osamu Muramatsu from the Yatsugatake South Base Observatory on the night of 8 December 1993. Several orbital calculations by Shuichi Nakano later determined its periodic nature; at that time, it had an orbital period of 7.40 years.

It was later recovered at the Saji Observatory in October 2000, where Brian G. Marsden and other astronomers were able to identify it as the same object that was observed by Kushida and Muramatsu in 1993.

== Origin ==
According to calculations made by Katsuhiko Ohtsuka of the Tokyo Meteor Network and David Asher of Armagh Observatory, Kushida–Muramatsu was temporarily captured by Jupiter as an irregular moon between 14 May 1949, and 15 July 1962, (12.17+0.29
−0.27 years). It is the fifth such object known to have been captured.

It is thought that quasi-Hilda comets may be escaped Hilda asteroids. Comet Shoemaker–Levy 9, which collided with Jupiter in 1994, is a more famous example of a quasi-Hilda comet.

Numbered comets
| Previous; 146P/Shoemaker–LINEAR | 147P/Kushida–Muramatsu | Next; 148P/Anderson–LINEAR |
