= NGC 5682 =

Galaxy in the constellation Boötes

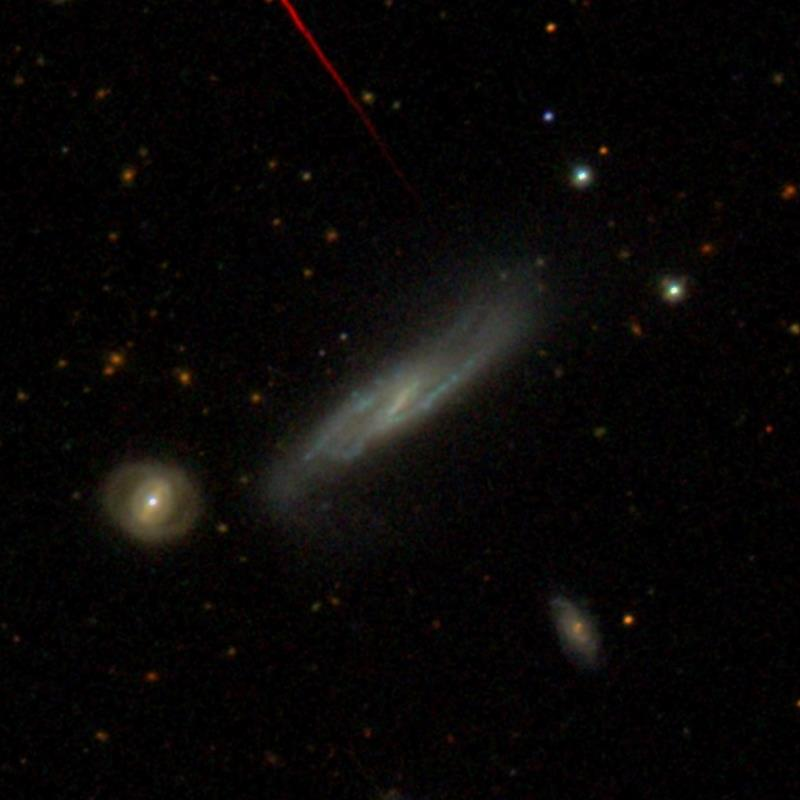
- NGC5682 - SDSS DR14

Observation data (J2000 epoch)
- Constellation: Boötes
- Right ascension: 14^{h} 34^{m} 45^{s}
- Declination: +48° 40′ 12″
- Redshift: 0,0076
- Distance: 104 million ly

Characteristics
- Type: SBb

Other designations
- CGCG 248-8, IRAS 14239+4853, KUG 1432+488, MCG 8-27-2, PGC 52107, UGC 9388

NGC 5682 is a spiral galaxy located in Boötes. It had a supernovae called SN 2005ci. SN 2005CI is located at 14^{h} 34^{m} 44^{s} and 48° 40′ 19″ (near the galaxy).
