= Satoru Otomo =

Japanese dentist and amateur astronomer

Minor planets discovered: 148
see § List of discovered minor planets

Satoru Otomo (大友 哲, Ōtomo Satoru, 19 December 1957, Mitaka) is a Japanese dentist, amateur astronomer and a discoverer of minor planets.

According to the Minor Planet Center, he is credited with the discovery of 148 asteroids between 1991 and 1997, 15 of which were co-discoveries with Osamu Muramatsu. As of 2016, he ranks in 81st place, just behind Tamara Mikhailovna Smirnova in the MPC's asteroid discovery listings.

== List of discovered minor planets ==
5337 Aoki^{[1]}	June 6, 1991
5377 Komori^{[1]}	March 17, 1991
5379 Abehiroshi^{[1]}	April 16, 1991
5488 Kiyosato	November 13, 1991
5561 Iguchi	August 17, 1991
5605 Kushida	February 17, 1993
5606 Muramatsu	March 1, 1993
5829 Ishidagoro^{[1]}	February 11, 1991
5922 Shouichi	October 21, 1992
5973 Takimoto	August 17, 1991
6043 Aurochs	September 9, 1991
(6138) 1991 JH1^{[1]}	May 14, 1991
6336 Dodo	October 21, 1992
6410 Fujiwara	November 29, 1992
(6494) 1992 NM	July 8, 1992
6520 Sugawa^{[1]}	April 16, 1991
6729 Emiko	November 4, 1991
6790 Pingouin	September 28, 1991
6830 Johnbackus^{[1]}	May 5, 1991
6860 Sims^{[1]}	February 11, 1991
6866 Kukai	February 12, 1992
6880 Hayamiyu	October 13, 1994
6910 Ikeguchi^{[1]}	March 17, 1991
(6917) 1993 FR2	March 29, 1993
6922 Yasushi	May 27, 1993
6969 Santaro	November 4, 1991
6970 Saigusa	January 10, 1992
6975 Hiroaki	August 25, 1992
6976 Kanatsu	May 23, 1993
7137 Ageo	January 4, 1994
7143 Haramura	November 17, 1995
7201 Kuritariku	October 25, 1994
7203 Sigeki	February 27, 1995
7291 Hyakutake	December 13, 1991
7592 Takinemachi	November 23, 1992
7597 Shigemi	April 14, 1993
7769 Okuni	November 4, 1991
7953 Kawaguchi	May 20, 1993
8187 Akiramisawa	December 15, 1992
8212 Naoshigetani	March 6, 1995
8276 Shigei^{[1]}	March 17, 1991
8374 Horohata	January 10, 1992
8397 Chiakitanaka	December 8, 1993
8668 Satomimura^{[1]}	April 16, 1991
(8708) 1994 DD	February 17, 1994
8724 Junkoehara	September 17, 1996
8855 Miwa^{[1]}	May 3, 1991
8862 Takayukiota	October 18, 1991
9041 Takane^{[1]}	February 9, 1991
9044 Kaoru^{[1]}	May 18, 1991

9060 Toyokawa	September 4, 1992
9191 Hokuto	December 13, 1991
9216 Masuzawa	November 1, 1995
9407 Kimuranaoto	November 28, 1994
9673 Kunishimakoto	October 25, 1997
9866 Kanaimitsuo	October 15, 1991
9886 Aoyagi	November 8, 1994
9960 Sekine	November 4, 1991
9972 Minoruoda	May 26, 1993
10141 Gotenba	November 5, 1993
10148 Shirase	April 14, 1994
10152 Ukichiro	September 11, 1994
10353 Momotaro	December 20, 1992
10540 Hachigoroh	November 13, 1991
10568 Yoshitanaka	February 2, 1994
10572 Kominejo	November 8, 1994
10602 Masakazu	October 16, 1996
(10849) 1995 BO_{1}	January 25, 1995
(10859) 1995 GJ_{7}	April 1, 1995
(11076) 1992 UR	October 21, 1992
(11110) 1995 VT1	November 2, 1995
(11301) 1992 XM	December 14. 1992
(11527) 1991 VU_{4}	November 5, 1991
(11544) 1992 UD3	October 26, 1992
(11568) 1993 GL	April 14, 1993
(11910) 1992 KJ	May 28, 1992
(12304) 1991 SR_{1}	September 19, 1991
(12316) 1992 HG	April 27, 1992
(12338) 1992 XE	December 14. 1992
(12351) 1993 JD	May 14, 1993
(12371) 1994 GL_{9}	April 14, 1994
(12402) 1995 PK	August 3, 1995
(12417) 1995 TC_{8}	October 2, 1995
(12721) 1991 PB	August 3, 1991
(12733) 1991 TV_{1}	October 13, 1991
(12736) 1991 VC_{3}	November 13, 1991
(12737) 1991 VW_{4}	November 10, 1991
(13078) 1991 WD	November 17, 1991
(13542) 1991 VC_{5}	November 10, 1991
(13563) 1992 UW	October 21, 1992
(13575) 1993 GN	April 14, 1993
(13614) 1994 VF_{2}	November 8, 1994
(13967) 1991 QJ	August 31, 1991
(14001) 1993 KR	May 26, 1993
(14044) 1995 VS_{1}	November 1, 1995
(14465) 1993 NB	July 15, 1993
(14480) 1994 PU_{1}	August 11, 1994
(14485) 1994 RK_{11}	September 11, 1994
(14488) 1994 TF_{15}	October 13, 1994
(14549) 1997 TM_{27}	October 8, 1997

(14553) 1997 UD_{25}	October 27, 1997
(14554) 1997 UE_{25}	October 27, 1997
(14891) 1991 VY_{4}	November 5, 1991
(14892) 1991 VE_{5}	November 4, 1991
(15297) 1992 CF	February 8, 1992
(15307) 1992 XK	December 15, 1992
(15751) 1991 VN_{4}	November 10, 1991
(15758) 1992 FT_{1}	March 30, 1992
(15776) 1993 KO	May 20, 1993
(16545) 1991 RN_{4}	September 9, 1991
(16580) 1992 HA	April 21, 1992
(16628) 1993 KF	May 16, 1993
(16679) 1994 EQ_{2}	March 14, 1994
(16685) 1994 JU_{8}	May 8, 1994
(16697) 1995 CQ	February 1, 1995
(17512) 1992 RN	September 4, 1992
(17598) 1995 KE_{2}	May 23, 1995
(17619) 1995 VT	November 1, 1995
(18454) 1995 BF_{1}	January 23, 1995
(18512) 1996 SO_{7}	September 17, 1996
(19187) 1991 VU_{2}	November 4, 1991
(19209) 1992 UW_{2}	October 25, 1992
(19242) 1994 CB_{1}	February 3, 1994
(19260) 1995 GT	April 4, 1995
(20057) 1993 GC	April 13, 1993
(22328) 1991 VJ_{1}	November 4, 1991
(22433) 1996 GC_{2}	April 9, 1996
(23521) 1992 US_{1}	October 21, 1992
(24703) 1991 PA	August 3, 1991
(24717) 1991 SA	September 16, 1991
(24729) 1991 VE_{3}	November 13, 1991
(24730) 1991 VM_{5}	November 5, 1991
(26114) 1991 QG	August 31, 1991
(26125) 1992 RG	September 3, 1992
(26155) 1994 VL_{7}	November 8, 1994
(26161) 1995 BY_{2}	January 27, 1995
(26844) 1991 VA_{4}	November 12, 1991
(27825) 1993 VP	November 9, 1993
(27829) 1994 BM_{4}	January 21, 1994
(27851) 1994 VG_{2}	November 8, 1994
(29310) 1993 VA_{5}	November 15, 1993
(32910) 1994 TE_{15}	October 13, 1994
(39562) 1992 QK	August 25, 1992
(42496) 1991 XB_{1}	December 13, 1991
(43875) 1994 WT_{3}	November 24, 1994
(48525) 1993 GB	April 14, 1993
(65764) 1994 TH_{15}	October 13, 1994
(73689) 1991 FK^{[1]}	March 17, 1991
^{1} with O. Muramatsu
