= NGC 3997 =

Galaxy in the constellation Leo

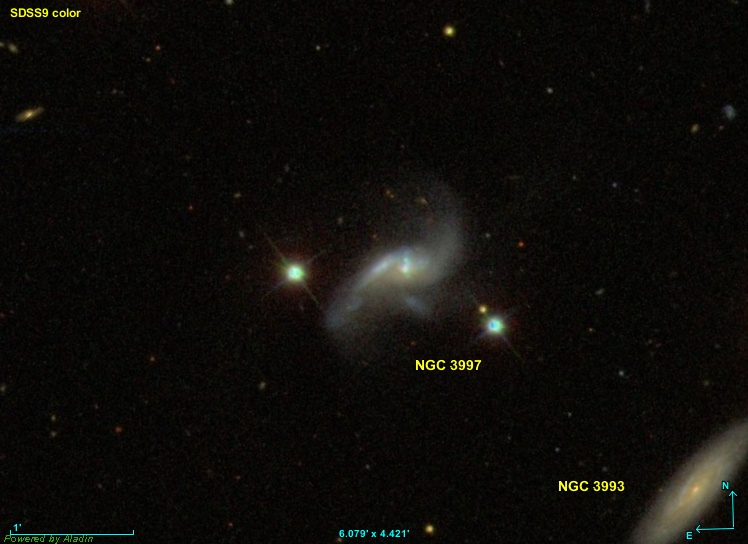
- NGC 3997 imaged by SDSS

Observation data (J2000 epoch)
- Constellation: Leo
- Right ascension: 11^{h} 57^{m} 48.2299^{s}
- Declination: +25° 16′ 14.268″
- Redshift: 0.015914±0.0000170
- Heliocentric radial velocity: 4,771±5 km/s
- Distance: 274.30 Mly (84.100 Mpc)
- Group or cluster: NGC 3997 Group (LGG 260)
- Apparent magnitude (V): 14.02

Characteristics
- Type: SBb pec
- Size: ~132,500 ly (40.61 kpc) (estimated)
- Apparent size (V): 1.7′ × 0.6′

Other designations
- HOLM 308B, IRAS 11552+2532, 2MASX J11574822+2516142, UGC 6942, MCG +04-28-102, PGC 37629, CGCG 127-114

NGC 3997 is a peculiar barred spiral galaxy in the constellation of Leo. Its velocity with respect to the cosmic microwave background is 5,078±22 km/s, which corresponds to a Hubble distance of 244.3 ± 17.1 Mly (74.90 ± 5.25 Mpc). Additionally, one non-redshift measurement gives a farther distance of 274.30 Mly (84.100 Mpc). It was discovered by British astronomer John Herschel on 19 February 1827.

NGC 3997 has a possible active galactic nucleus, i.e. it has a compact region at the center of a galaxy that emits a significant amount of energy across the electromagnetic spectrum, with characteristics indicating that this luminosity is not produced by the stars.

== NGC 3997 group ==
NGC 3997 is a member of a group of galaxies named after it (also known as LGG 260). This group contains 6 galaxies, including NGC 3989, NGC 3993, IC 746, CGCG 127-109, and NGC 4015B.

== Supernova ==
One supernova has been observed in NGC 3997:

- SN 2004aw (Type Ic, mag. 17.1) was discovered independently by Tom Boles and Kōichi Itagaki on 10 March 2004.

== See also ==
- List of NGC objects (3001–4000)
