= Osamu Muramatsu =

Japanese astronomer

Minor planets discovered: 73
3432 Kobuchizawa^{[1]}^{[2]}	March 7, 1986
4033 Yatsugatake^{[2]}	March 16, 1986
4219 Nakamura^{[2]}	February 19, 1988
4458 Oizumi^{[3]}	January 21, 1990
4634 Shibuya^{[2]}	January 16, 1988
4640 Hara^{[3]}	April 1, 1989
5239 Reiki^{[4]}	November 14, 1990
5337 Aoki^{[5]}	June 6, 1991
5352 Fujita^{[3]}	December 27, 1989
5377 Komori^{[5]}	March 17, 1991
5379 Abehiroshi^{[5]}	April 16, 1991
5405 Neverland^{[3]}	April 11, 1991
5473 Yamanashi^{[3]}	November 5, 1988
5489 Oberkochen^{[3]}	January 17, 1993
5687 Yamamotoshinobu^{[3]}	January 13, 1991
5829 Ishidagoro^{[5]}	February 11, 1991
(6138) 1991 JH1^{[5]}	May 14, 1991
6308 Ebisuzaki^{[3]}	January 17, 1990
6395 Hilliard^{[3]}	October 21, 1990
6405 Komiyama^{[3]}	April 30, 1992
6464 Kaburaki^{[3]}	February 1, 1994
6520 Sugawa^{[5]}	April 16, 1991
6612 Hachioji^{[3]}	March 10, 1994
6643 Morikubo^{[3]}	November 7, 1990
6667 Sannaimura^{[3]}	March 14, 1994
6731 Hiei^{[3]}	January 24, 1992
6830 Johnbackus^{[5]}	May 5, 1991
6860 Sims^{[5]}	February 11, 1991
6865 Dunkerley^{[3]}	October 2, 1991
6868 Seiyauyeda^{[3]}	April 22, 1992
6910 Ikeguchi^{[5]}	March 17, 1991
(6915) 1992 HH^{[3]}	April 30, 1992
7068 Minowa^{[3]}	November 26, 1994
7421 Kusaka^{[3]}	April 30, 1992
(7514) 1986 ED^{[1]}^{[2]}	March 7, 1986
7575 Kimuraseiji^{[3]}	December 22, 1989
(7765) 1991 AD^{[3]}	January 8, 1991
7775 Taiko^{[3]}	December 4, 1992
(7821) 1991 AC^{[3]}	January 8, 1991
7830 Akihikotago^{[3]}	February 24, 1993
8276 Shigei^{[5]}	March 17, 1991
(8532) 1992 YW_{3}^{[3]}	December 29, 1992
8668 Satomimura^{[5]}	April 16, 1991
8691 Etsuko^{[3]}	October 21, 1992
8855 Miwa^{[5]}	May 3, 1991
(8876) 1992 WU_{3}^{[3]}	November 23, 1992
9041 Takane^{[5]}	February 9, 1991
9044 Kaoru^{[5]}	May 18, 1991
9190 Masako^{[3]}	November 4, 1991
(9335) 1991 AA_{1}^{[3]}	January 10, 1991
9844 Otani^{[3]}	November 23, 1989
10144 Bernardbigot^{[3]}	January 9, 1994
10566 Zabadak^{[3]}	January 14, 1994
(11513) 1991 CE_{1}^{[3]}	February 12, 1991
11528 Mie^{[3]}	December 3, 1991
(12337) 1992 WV_{3}^{[3]}	November 24, 1992
12342 Kudohmichiko^{[3]}	January 30, 1993
(12735) 1991 VV_{1}^{[3]}	November 4, 1991
14902 Miyairi^{[3]}	January 17, 1993
(15269) 1990 XF^{[3]}	December 8, 1990
15350 Naganuma^{[3]}	November 3, 1994
(15764) 1992 UL_{8}^{[3]}	October 31, 1992
16599 Shorland^{[3]}	January 20, 1993
(17558) 1994 AA_{1}^{[3]}	January 4, 1994
17563 Tsuneyoshi^{[3]}	February 5, 1994
(20042) 1993 CK_{1}^{[3]}	February 15, 1993
27748 Vivianhoette^{[4]}	January 9, 1991
27791 Masaru^{[3]}	February 24, 1993
35062 Sakuranosyou^{[2]}	March 12, 1988
(48594) 1994 VA_{2}^{[3]}	November 3, 1994
(73689) 1991 FK^{[5]}	March 17, 1991
73782 Yanagida^{[6]}	October 14, 1994
162011 Konnohmaru^{[3]}	January 4, 1994
1. ^{1} with T. Urata; 2. ^{2} with M. Inoue; 3. ^{3} with Y. Kushida; 4. ^{4} with S. Izumikawa; 5. ^{5} with S. Otomo; 6. ^{6} with A. Tsuchikawa

Osamu Muramatsu (村松 修, Muramatsu Osamu; born 1949) is a Japanese astronomer and discoverer of asteroids and comets. He is credited by the Minor Planet Center with the discovery of 73 minor planets. He also co-discovered 147P/Kushida-Muramatsu, a periodic comet.

Muramatsu works at the planetarium in the Shibuya ward of Tokyo, Japan. The inner main-belt asteroid 5606 Muramatsu, discovered by astronomer and colleague Satoru Otomo, was named in his honor on 28 July 1999 (M.P.C. 35483).
