= Yoshio Kushida =

Japanese seismologist and amateur astronomer

Minor planets discovered: 56
see § List of discovered minor planets

Yoshio Kushida (串田 嘉男, Kushida Yoshio; born September 19, 1957 in Hachioji, Tokyo) is a Japanese seismologist, amateur astronomer and a discoverer of minor planets and comets.

Kushida is the founder of the Yatsugatake South Base Observatory. He is credited by the Minor Planet Center with the discovery of 56 numbered minor planets during 1988–1994, most of them in collaboration with astronomer Osamu Muramatsu, as well as with Masaru Inoue and with his wife Reiki Kushida. He also discovered and co-discovered the two periodic comets 144P/Kushida and 147P/Kushida-Muramatsu, respectively.

The main-belt asteroid 5605 Kushida, discovered by Satoru Otomo at Kiyosato in 1993, was named in his honor. Naming citation was published on 28 July 1999 (M.P.C. 35483).

== List of discovered minor planets ==
4458 Oizumi^{[1]}	January 21, 1990
4577 Chikako^{[2]}	November 30, 1988
4640 Hara^{[1]}	April 1, 1989
4875 Ingalls^{[3]}	February 19, 1991
5352 Fujita^{[1]}	December 27, 1989
5403 Takachiho^{[2]}	February 20, 1990
5405 Neverland^{[1]}	April 11, 1991
5473 Yamanashi^{[1]}	November 5, 1988
5489 Oberkochen^{[1]}	January 17, 1993
5687 Yamamotoshinobu^{[1]}	January 13, 1991
6308 Ebisuzaki^{[1]}	January 17, 1990
6395 Hilliard^{[1]}	October 21, 1990
6405 Komiyama^{[1]}	April 30, 1992
6464 Kaburaki^{[1]}	February 1, 1994
6612 Hachioji^{[1]}	March 10, 1994
6643 Morikubo^{[1]}	November 7, 1990
6667 Sannaimura^{[1]}	March 14, 1994
6731 Hiei^{[1]}	January 24, 1992
6865 Dunkerley^{[1]}	October 2, 1991
6868 Seiyauyeda^{[1]}	April 22, 1992

(6915) 1992 HH^{[1]}	April 30, 1992
7068 Minowa^{[1]}	November 26, 1994
7421 Kusaka^{[1]}	April 30, 1992
7575 Kimuraseiji^{[1]}	December 22, 1989
(7765) 1991 AD^{[1]}	January 8, 1991
7775 Taiko^{[1]}	December 4, 1992
(7821) 1991 AC^{[1]}	January 8, 1991
7830 Akihikotago^{[1]}	February 24, 1993
(8532) 1992 YW_{3}^{[1]}	December 29, 1992
8691 Etsuko^{[1]}	October 21, 1992
(8830) 1988 VZ^{[2]}	November 7, 1988
(8876) 1992 WU_{3}^{[1]}	November 23, 1992
9190 Masako^{[1]}	November 4, 1991
(9335) 1991 AA_{1}^{[1]}	January 10, 1991
9746 Kazukoichikawa^{[2]}	November 7, 1988
9844 Otani^{[1]}	November 23, 1989
10144 Bernardbigot^{[1]}	January 9, 1994
10566 Zabadak^{[1]}	January 14, 1994
(11513) 1991 CE_{1}^{[1]}	February 12, 1991
11528 Mie^{[1]}	December 3, 1991

(12337) 1992 WV_{3}^{[1]}	November 24, 1992
12342 Kudohmichiko^{[1]}	January 30, 1993
(12691) 1988 VF_{2}^{[2]}	November 7, 1988
(12735) 1991 VV_{1}^{[1]}	November 4, 1991
14902 Miyairi^{[1]}	January 17, 1993
(15269) 1990 XF^{[1]}	December 8, 1990
(15764) 1992 UL_{8}^{[1]}	October 31, 1992
16599 Shorland^{[1]}	January 20, 1993
(17558) 1994 AA_{1}^{[1]}	January 4, 1994
17563 Tsuneyoshi^{[1]}	February 5, 1994
(20042) 1993 CK_{1}^{[1]}	February 15, 1993
26829 Sakaihoikuen^{[2]}	November 30, 1989
27791 Masaru^{[1]}	February 24, 1993
162011 Konnohmaru^{[1]}	January 4, 1994
^{1} with O. Muramatsu^{2} with M. Inoue^{3} with R. Kushida
