= Kanki Izumigawa =

Okinawan karate master (1908–1967)

Kanki Izumigawa 泉川 寛喜
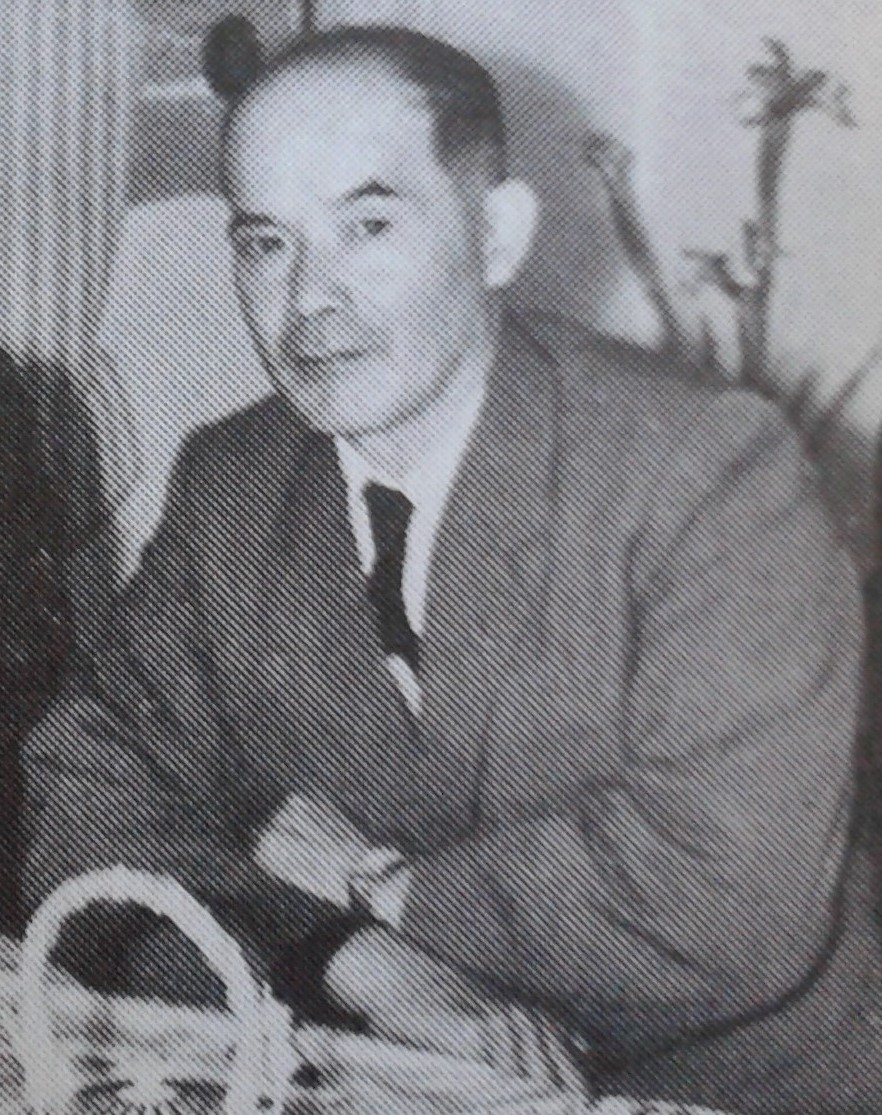
- Born: April 16, 1908; Naha, Okinawa
- Died: November 1, 1967 (aged 59); Kawasaki, Japan
- Style: Goju-ryu
- Teachers: Juhatsu Kyoda, Seiko Higa
- Rank: Sōke, Founder of Senbukan Dojo, Hanshi - Dai Nippon Butokukai

Other information
- Notable students: Satoru Suzuki, Sosui Ichikawa, Seichi Akamine
- Website: https://www.senbukaihonbu.com/

Kanki Izumigawa (泉川 寛喜, Izumigawa Kanki; 1908 – 1967) was a karate master who learned Goju-Ryu from Seiko Higa on Okinawa and Saipan. Higa had studied under Kanryo Higashionna (of Naha-Te) and trained with Chojun Miyagi (the founder of Goju-Ryu). In his youth Izumigawa also studied karate under Juhatsu Kyoda, who was himself a senior student of Kanryo Higashionna. Izumigawa was born in Okinawa to a samurai family and was the founder of the Senbukan Dojo, which had its headquarters in Kawasaki City and branches in Tokyo, Osaka, Ota, Yokoyama, Nagoya and even Hawaii. The Senbukan dojo was established in 1939 and was the first dojo of Okinawan Goju-Ryu on mainland Japan. Today, It's currently the oldest Goju-Ryu dojo in the world.

Kanki Izumigawa was the first student of Seiko Higa to receive the bubishi from him in 1937. Before dan rank and titles the bubishi was used as a sort of menkyo kaiden in Goju-Ryu. This tradition is still carried on by some instructors from Izumigawa's lineage. In 1942 Kanki Izumigawa was presented with the coveted title of Renshi from the prestigious Dai Nippon Butokai. He would later be promoted to Hanshi in 1957. Kanki Izumikawa was instrumental in the establishment of the Nihon Karate do Rengokai. Several of his senior students held positions in the organisation such as Tsutomu Takato and Sosui Ichikawa.

In both 1961 and 1964 he travelled to Hawaii to instruct at the branch dojo founded by Kenneth Murakami and George Miyasaki. These two men trained with Izumigawa at the Senbukan honbu in Kawasaki during the 1950s while they were stationed in Japan. Upon their return to Hawaii they opened a Senbukan branch dojo which continues to this day. In 1961 Izumigawa was accompanied by Ryoichi Yanase (4th dan). In 1964 He brought both Yanase (now 5th dan) and Busen Arakawa (6th dan) to act as his assistants while teaching at the Hawaii dojo. Kanki Izumigawa was also a shihan of Ryukyu Kobudo, in addition to Goju Ryu and was listed in Shinken Taira's Ryukyo Kobudo Encyclopedia as an advisor.

Kanki Izumigawa died in 1967 at the age of 59. His oldest son Kanbun Izumigawa carried on his School in Japan as the second soke of the Senbukan. Seiichi Akamine helped him to spread Goju-Ryu and Seiko Higa tradition in mainland Japan, travel to South-America to spread Karate-do and founded the Ken-Shin-Kan school. Kanki Izumigawa's senior students included Busen Arakawa (Rinbukan), Sosui Ichikawa (Sosuikan), Tsutomu Takato (Ota Senbukan Branch Chief), Hyotaro Harada (Seishin Juku), Kenneth Murakami (Hawaii Senbukan), Keisetsu Yoshimaru, Satoru Suzuki, Kazunari Sekishiro and Ryoichi Yanase. Ultimately the main senior students that taught and preserved Izumigawa's teachings in Japan were Busen Arakawa and Sosui Ichikawa.

After Kanbun Izumigawa died in 1982, the dojo was inherited by the second son Katsuya Izumigawa (the 3rd soke) who continues to head the dojo and organisation today. In 2016 the organisation was officially renamed to the International Karate Do Goju Ryu Senbukai by Katsuya Izumigawa.
