= NGC 4005 =

Spiral galaxy in the constellation Leo

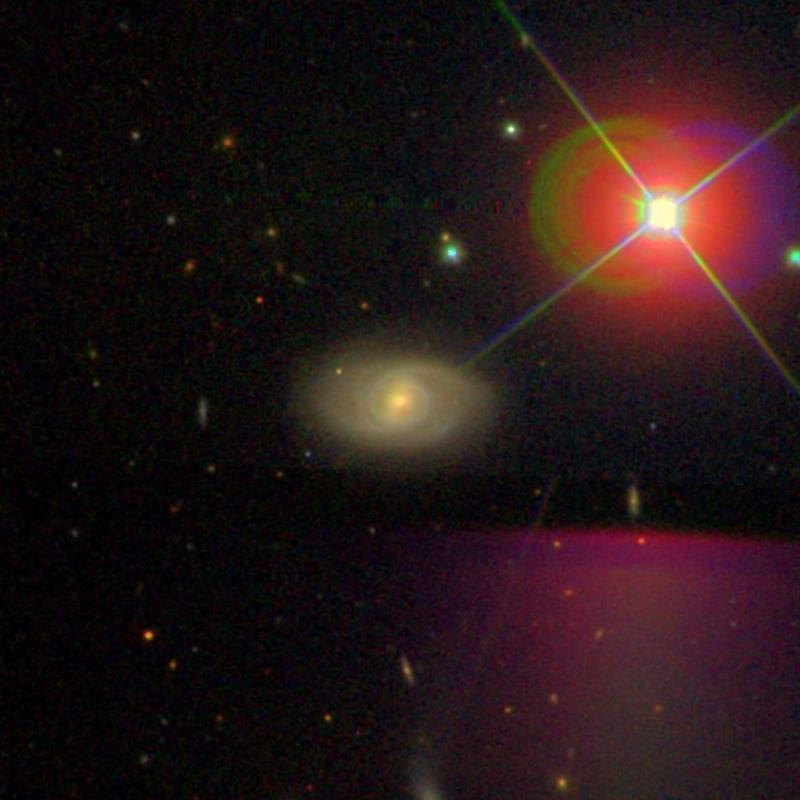

Observation data (J2000.0 epoch)
- Constellation: Leo
- Right ascension: 11^{h} 58^{m} 10.163^{s}
- Declination: +25° 07′ 20.03″
- Redshift: 0.01485
- Heliocentric radial velocity: 4419 ± 3 km/s
- Distance: Around 200 million light-years
- Apparent magnitude (V): 13.0
- Apparent magnitude (B): 1.2' × 0.7'

Characteristics
- Type: S

Other designations
- Zw 127-10, UGC 6952, MCG +04-28-107, PGC 37661

NGC 4005 is a spiral galaxy in the constellation Leo, located close to the border with Coma Berenices. A faintly-glowing galaxy, its apparent magnitude is 13.0.

The American astronomer Barbara A. Williams in 1986 noted that when observations are made of 23 galaxies centred on NGC 4005, a trend is found along the major axis of the group. The correlation in the group between position and velocity's slope is greatly different from 0. Williams put forward the explanation for this that the group rotates with a period of less than 4 billion years, however other interpretations have been discussed.

It was discovered by William Herschel on 6 April 1785.
