= Laura Izumikawa =

Southern California-based photographer

- Born: Tokyo, Japan
- Other names: Laura Iz; Laura Izumikawa Choi
- Occupation: Photographer
- Years active: 2007–present
- Known for: Naptime with Joey
- Spouse: Allen Choi
- Website: lauraiz.com

Laura Izumikawa Choi is a Southern California-based photographer who created a popular Instagram feed that features her daughter Joey often dressed in costumes as she sleeps during naps. Some of the photographs are published in the 2017 book, Naptime with Joey.

== Early life and education ==
Izumikawa was born in Tokyo. Her mother is Korean and her father is Chinese-Japanese. When she was 3 years old, Izumikawa's family immigrated to Southern California.

Izumikawa became interested in journalism and photojournalism while attending law school, where she had an interest in African international law. A 2007 trip to Rwanda inspired a career shift to photojournalism and photography.

== Career ==
Izumikawa works as a lifestyle and wedding photographer in Southern California. In 2016, while on maternity leave for her daughter, Joey, Izumikawa began taking pictures of infant Joey – who is a deep sleeper – as she napped in various costumes as a way to send fun pictures to family and capture her time as a baby. The costumes were for the most part made from materials found around the house or borrowed from friends. The photos were taken with an iPhone. The photos were meant to be images that could go in a baby book, but Izumikawa also posted the photos on Instagram, where they were very popular. Netflix posted the picture of Joey dressed up as Barb from Stranger Things and then The Huffington Post wrote about Izumikawa's feed and Joey went viral.

Many of the costumes feature different cultures from around the world and are sometimes sent in by fans. Some of the costumes are inspired by characters from movies and TV shows such as Star Wars (Han Solo), The Princess Bride (Inigo Montoya), Game of Thrones (Jon Snow), Braveheart (William Wallace), and Stranger Things (Barb). Some images feature the sleeping Joey wearing various outfits where she is a profession, like a baker, a sushi chef, or an Ultimate Fighting Championship fighter (Holly Holm), while others feature people from popular culture, like Sia, Beyoncé and DMC from Run-DMC.

In 2017, Izumikawa published the book Naptime with Joey, which is a compilation of many of the photos on her Instagram feed.

== Joey Choi ==
Izumikawa's daughter, Joey Marie Choi, was born on April 20, 2016. She is three-quarters Korean and one-eighth Japanese and Chinese.

== Personal life ==
Izumikawa is married to Allen Choi, an optometrist, who is Korean-American. They live in Southern California with their daughters Joey and Casey (born Thanksgiving Day 2018.) Izumikawa is Christian, and is active in her church.

== Works and publications ==
- Izumikawa, Laura (2017). Naptime with Joey. New York: Gallery Books. ISBN 978-1-501-17407-0. OCLC 1005355564.
