= Reiki Kushida =

Japanese astronomer

Minor planets discovered: 1
4875 Ingalls	19 February 1991	MPC^{[1]}
^{1} co-discovery with Y. Kushida

Reiki Kushida (串田 麗樹, Kushida Reiki) is a Japanese amateur astronomer, discoverer of supernovae such as 1991bg (the first visual discovery made by a female astronomer), and co-discoverer of the 4875 Ingalls, a Flora asteroid from the main-belt.

Reiki Kushida is married to astronomer Yoshio Kushida, who is the co-discoverer of 4875 Ingalls and a prolific discoverer of minor planets and comets himself. The asteroid 5239 Reiki, discovered by astronomer Shun-ei Izumikawa, was named in her honor on 6 February 1993 (M.P.C. 21610).
