= Yatsugatake South Base Observatory =

Japanese astronomical observatory

Coordinates: 35°52′57″N 138°21′53″E

Yatsugatake South Base Observatory (八ヶ岳南麓天文台, Yatsugatake Nanroku Tenmondai) is an observatory in Hokuto, Yamanashi, Japan. Its observatory code is 896.

It is frequently used due to its proximity to the Greater Tokyo Area, which has resulted in many asteroid discoveries. Yoshio Kushida has worked on observational research on pre-earthquake natural phenomena.

The inner main-belt asteroid 4033 Yatsugatake, discovered by Japanese astronomers Masaru Inoue and Osamu Muramatsu in 1986, was named after the Yatsugatake Mountains where this observatory and the Kobuchizawa Observatory (386) are located. The official naming citation was published by the Minor Planet Center on 20 May 1989 (M.P.C. 14634).
