= List of minor planet discoverers =

This is a list of notable minor-planet discoverers credited by the Minor Planet Center with the discovery of one or several minor planets (such as near-Earth and main-belt asteroids, Jupiter trojans and distant objects). As of 22 October 2025, the discovery of over 800,000 numbered minor planets are credited to 2,186 astronomers, observatories, telescopes or surveys.

== Discovering astronomers ==
The table consist of the following fields:

- Astronomers: links to the corresponding article about the discovering astronomer on Wikipedia.
- Discoveries: displays the total number of discovered and co-discovered minor planets made by the discoverer (numbered bodies only). It links to the corresponding "Discovery by..." category, which are subcategories of Category:Discoveries by astronomer. These categories do not contain discoveries for which no page on Wikipedia exists. Astronomers with only a few discoveries sometimes do not have their own discovery-category (redlinks). For those who have discovered only one single minor planet, the link in the discovery column directly points to the corresponding entry in the list of minor planets.
- DOB–DOD: displays the astronomer's date of birth and, if applicable, death.
- Name(s) at MPC: displays the name of the discoverer as used by the MPC, where the abbreviated first name is written before the family name. Some discoverers have multiple names due to inconsistencies and typos. The first name listed is used in all lists of minor planets.
- Asteroid(s): minor-planet discoverers are often honored with the naming of (one or several) asteroids by their colleagues. This column gives links to those asteroids.

| Astronomer | Discoveries | DOB–DOD | Name(s) at MPC | Asteroid(s) |
|---|---|---|---|---|
| Hiroshi Abe | 28 | 1958–pres. | H. Abe | (5379) |
| Christopher Aikman | 6 | 1943–pres. | G. C. L. Aikman | (661786) |
| Makio Akiyama | 16 | 1950–pres. | M. Akiyama | (4904) |
| Vladimir Albitsky | 10 | 1891–1952 | V. Albitskij | (1783) |
| Gregory Scott Aldering | 4 | 1962–pres. | G. Aldering | (26533) |
| Heikki A. Alikoski | 13 | 1912–1997 | H. Alikoski | (1567) |
| Jeff T. Alu | 25 | 1966–pres. | J. Alu | (4104) |
| Leonard L. Amburgey | 2 | 1945–pres. | L. L. Amburgey | — |
| A. David Andrews | 1 | 1933–pres. | A. D. Andrews | — |
| Milan Antal | 17 | 1935–1999 | M. Antal | (6717) |
| Plinio Antolini | 4 | 1920–2012 | P. Antolini | — |
| Pierre Antonini | 35 | 1933–pres. | P. Antonini | (12580) |
| Masakatsu Aoki | 2 | 1957–pres. | M. Aoki | (5337) |
| Rolf Apitzsch | 127 | 1943–pres. | R. Apitzsch | (29214) |
| Masaru Arai | 45 | 1952–pres. | M. Arai | (21082) |
| Hiroshi Araki | 3 | 1935–pres. | H. Araki | (8707) |
| Sylvain Arend | 51 | 1902–1992 | S. J. Arend | (1502) |
| Mark Armstrong | 2 | 1958–pres. | M. Armstrong | — |
| Atsuo Asami | 7 | n.a. | A. Asami | — |
| David J. Asher | 10 | 1966–pres. | D. J. Asher | (6564) |
| Karl Augustesen | 6 | 1945–pres. | K. Augustesen | (5171) |
| Walter Baade | 10 | 1893–1960 | W. Baade | (1501) |
| Ulrika Babiaková | 14 | 1976–2002 | U. Babiaková; U. Babiakova | (32531) |
| Paolo Bacci | 1 | 1968–pres. | P. Bacci | (108205) |
| Solon Irving Bailey | 1 | 1854–1931 | S. I. Bailey | — |
| David D. Balam | 276 | n.a. | D. D. Balam | (3749) |
| Loren C. Ball | 112 | 1948–pres. | L. Ball | (16095) |
| Thomas J. Balonek | 9 | n.a. | T. J. Balonek | — |
| Odette Bancilhon | 1 | 1908–1998 | O. Bancilhon | (1713) |
| Yoshiaki Banno | 1 | 1952–1991 | Y. Banno | (3394) |
| Kristina M. Barkume | 1 | n.a. | K. M. Barkume | — |
| Ewan Barr | 5 | n.a. | E. Barr | — |
| Maria A. Barucci | 3 | n.a. | M. A. Barucci | (3485) |
| James Bauer | 1 | 1968–pres. | J. Bauer | (16232) |
| Ivo Baueršíma | 1 | 1931–pres. | I. Baueršíma; I. Bauersima | — |
| Johann M. Baur | 15 | 1930–2007 | J. M. Baur | (11673) |
| Andrew C. Becker | 645 | 1973–pres. | A. C. Becker | (5280) |
| Sergey Belyavsky | 36 | 1883–1953 | S. Belyavsky; S. Beljavskij | (1074) |
| Graham E. Bell | 59 | n.a. | G. Bell | — |
| Yuri A. Belyaev | 7 | n.a. | Yu. A. Belyaev | — |
| Zouhair Benkhaldoun | 1 | 1959–pres. | Z. Benkhaldoun | (133892) |
| Fabrizio Bernardi | 55 | 1972–pres. | F. Bernardi | (27983) |
| Laurent Bernasconi | 105 | 1966–pres. | L. Bernasconi | (13793) |
| Wolf Bickel | 1253 | 1942–pres. | W. Bickel | (4324) |
| Guillaume Bigourdan | 1 | 1851–1932 | G. Bigourdan | — |
| Richard P. Binzel | 3 | 1958–pres. | R. P. Binzel | (2873) |
| Kurt Birkle | 9 | 1939–2010 | K. Birkle | (4803) |
| Mirel Bîrlan | 2 | 1963–pres. | M. Birlan | (10034) |
| Andrea Boattini | 907 | 1969–pres. | A. Boattini | (8925) |
| Henri M. J. Boffin | 11 | n.a. | H. M. J. Boffin; H. Boffin | — |
| Alfred Bohrmann | 9 | 1904–2000 | A. Bohrmann | (1635) |
| Tom Boles | 1 | 1944–pres. | T. Boles | (7648) |
| Gennadiy Borisov | 7 | 1962–pres. | G. Borisov | (624448) |
| Freimut Börngen | 539 | 1930–2021 | F. Börngen; F. Borngen | (3859) |
| Alphonse Borrelly | 18 | 1842–1926 | A. Borrelly | (1539) |
| Edward L. G. Bowell | 572 | 1943–pres. | E. Bowell | (2246) |
| Louis Boyer | 40 | 1901–1999 | L. Boyer | (1215) |
| Joseph L. Brady | 8 | n.a. | J. L. Brady | — |
| Alexis Brandeker | 5 | 1974–pres. | A. Brandeker | — |
| John Broughton | 1220 | 1952–pres. | J. Broughton | (24105) |
| Michael E. Brown | 32 | 1965–pres. | M. E. Brown | (11714) |
| Ladislav Brožek | 23 | 1952–pres. | L. Brožek; L. Brozek | — |
| Marc Buie | 1023 | 1958–pres. | M. W. Buie | (7553) |
| Bella A. Burnasheva | 13 | 1944–pres. | B. A. Burnasheva | (4427) |
| Robert Burnham Jr. | 1 | 1931–1993 | R. Burnham | (3467) |
| Joseph A. Burns | 1 | 1941–pres. | J. A. Burns | (2708) |
| Schelte J. Bus | 1688 | 1956–pres. | S. J. Bus | (3254) |
| Luca Buzzi | 9 | 1982–pres. | L. Buzzi | (6517) |
| Michael P. Candy | 3 | 1928–1994 | M. P. Candy | (3015) |
| Luigi Carnera | 16 | 1875–1962 | L. Carnera | (39653) |
| Rafael Carrasco Garrorena | 1 | 1902–1981 | R. Carrasco | — |
| Claudio Casacci | 8 | 1958–pres. | C. Casacci | (4814) |
| Vincenzo Silvano Casulli | 220 | 1944–2018 | V. S. Casulli | (7132) |
| Gabriele Cattani | 18 | n.a. | G. Cattani | — |
| Marco Cavagna | 19 | 1958–2005 | M. Cavagna | (10149) |
| Kazimieras Černis | 198 | 1958–pres. | K. Černis; K. Cernis | (29692) |
| Vincenzo Cerulli | 1 | 1859–1927 | V. Cerulli | (31028) |
| Carlos Ulrrico Cesco | 19 | 19?–1987 | C. U. Cesco | (1571) |
| Jean Chacornac | 6 | 1823–1873 | J. Chacornac | (1622) |
| Zhang Jiaxiang | 1 | 1932–2019 | C.-H. Chang | (4760) |
| Zhang Yuzhe | 1 | 1902–1986 | Y. C. Chang | (2051) |
| Auguste Charlois | 99 | 1864–1910 | A. Charlois | (1510) |
| Jun Chen | 11 | n.a. | J. Chen | — |
| Tao Chen (astronomer) | 3 | 1980–pres. | T. Chen | (19873) |
| Lyudmila Chernykh | 267 | 1935–2017 | L. I. Chernykh | (2325) |
| Nikolai Chernykh | 537 | 1931–2004 | N. S. Chernykh | (2325) |
| Dennis K. Chesney | 38 | n.a. | D. K. Chesney | — |
| Dmitry Chestnov | 33 | n.a. | D. Chestnov; D. N. Chestnov | — |
| Paolo Chiavenna | 15 | n.a. | P. Chiavenna | — |
| Bernard Christophe | 112 | n.a. | B. Christophe | — |
| Joseph Churms | 2 | 1926–1994 | J. Churms | — |
| Edwin Foster Coddington | 3 | 1870–1950 | E. F. Coddington | — |
| Jérôme Eugène Coggia | 5 | 1849–1919 | J. Coggia | (227147) |
| Michael Collins (astronomer) | 51 | n.a. | M. Collins | (32584) |
| Josep Comas i Solà | 11 | 1868–1937 | J. Comas i Solà; J. Comas Solà; J. Comas Sola | (1102), (1655) |
| Paul G. Comba | 701 | 1926–2017 | P. G. Comba | (7636) |
| Martin Connors | 1 | 1954–pres. | M. Connors | (13700) |
| Walter R. Cooney Jr. | 47 | 1962–pres. | W. R. Cooney Jr. | (35365) |
| Pablo Cottenot | 1 | n.a. | P. Cottenot | — |
| Fernand Courty | 2 | 1862–1921 | F. Courty | — |
| Philip Herbert Cowell | 1 | 1870–1949 | P. H. Cowell | (1898) |
| Leland Cunningham | 4 | 1904–1989 | L. E. Cunningham | (1754) |
| Heber Doust Curtis | 1 | 1872–1942 | H. D. Curtis | — |
| Germano D'Abramo | 3 | 1973–pres. | G. D'Abramo | (16154) |
| Heinrich Louis d'Arrest | 1 | 1822–1875 | H. d'Arrest | (9133) |
| Donald R. Davis | 6 | n.a. | D. Davis | (3638) |
| Denis Denisenko | 1 | 1971–pres. | D. Denisenko | — |
| Leo Anton Karl de Ball | 1 | 1853–1916 | K. de Ball | — |
| Peter De Cat | 28 | n.a. | P. De Cat | — |
| Annibale de Gasparis | 9 | 1819–1892 | A. de Gasparis | (4279) |
| José De Queiroz | 6 | 1954–pres. | J. De Queiroz; J. D. Queiroz | (72042) |
| Charles P. de Saint-Aignan | 12 | 1977–pres. | C. P. de Saint-Aignan | (5995) |
| Giovanni de Sanctis | 42 | 1949–pres. | G. de Sanctis; G. De Sanctis | (3268) |
| Henri Debehogne | 744 | 1928–2007 | H. Debehogne | (2359) |
| Joseph A. Dellinger | 124 | 1961–pres. | J. Dellinger | (78392) |
| Eugène Joseph Delporte | 66 | 1882–1955 | E. Delporte | (1274) |
| Audrey C. Delsanti | 2 | 1976–pres. | A. C. Delsanti; A. Dalsanti | (87142) |
| Christophe Demeautis | 21 | n.a. | C. Demeautis s C. Demeautis es C. Demeautis | (14141) |
| Alexander Deutsch | 1 | 1901–1986 | A. Deutsch | — |
| Dennis di Cicco | 60 | 1950–pres. | D. di Cicco | (3841) |
| Aldo Di Clemente | 1 | 1948–pres. | A. Di Clemente | (91214) |
| Andrea Di Paola | 14 | 1970–pres. | A. Di Paola; A. D. Paola | (27130) |
| Mario Di Sora | 7 | 1961–pres. | M. Di Sora | (21999) |
| Wilhelm Dieckvoß | 2 | 1908–1982 | W. Dieckvoss | (1706) |
| Alessandro Dimai | 1 | 1962–2019 | A. Dimai | (25276) |
| Anlaug Amanda Djupvik | 1 | n.a. | A. A. Kaas | — |
| Petar Đurković | 2 | 1908–1981 | P. Đurković; P. Djurkovic | — |
| Jerzy Dobrzycki | 1 | 1927–2004 | J. Dobrzycki | — |
| Sauro Donati | 22 | 1959–pres. | S. Donati | (69977) |
| Alain Doressoundiram | 2 | 1968–pres. | A. Doressoundiram | (7456) |
| François Dossin | 5 | 1927–1998 | F. Dossin | — |
| Raymond Smith Dugan | 16 | 1878–1940 | R. S. Dugan | (2772) |
| R. Scott Dunbar | 11 | n.a. | R. S. Dunbar; S. Dunbar | (3718) |
| Philippe Dupouy | 4 | 1952–pres. | P. Dupouy; C. R. P. Dupouy | (214485) |
| Douglas Tybor Durig | 62 | 1961–pres. | D. T. Durig | — |
| Marino Dusić | 2 | n.a. | M. Dusić; M. Dusic | — |
| Ilgmārs Eglītis | 43 | 1951–pres. | I. Eglītis; I. Eglitis; I. Egliti | (320153) |
| Leonid Elenin | 480 | 1981–pres. | L. Elenin | — |
| James L. Elliot | 1 | 1943–2011 | J. L. Elliot | (3193) |
| Eric Walter Elst | 3885 | 1936–2022 | E. W. Elst; E. Elst | (3936) |
| Kin Endate | 637 | 1960–pres. | K. Endate | (4282) |
| Emil Ernst | 1 | 1889–1942 | E. Ernst | — |
| James Ferguson | 3 | 1797–1867 | J. Ferguson | (1745) |
| Rafael Ferrando | 305 | 1966–pres. | R. Ferrando | (161545) |
| Walter Ferreri | 15 | 1948–pres. | W. Ferreri | (3308) |
| Martin Fiedler | 7 | 1978–pres. | M. Fiedler | — |
| Alan Fitzsimmons | 46 | n.a. | A. Fitzsimmons | (4985) |
| Wilhelm Julius Foerster | 1 | 1832–1921 | W. Foerster; W. Forster | (6771) |
| Giuseppe Forti | 50 | 1939–2007 | G. Forti | (6876) |
| Royal Harwood Frost | 1 | 1879–1950 | R. H. Frost | — |
| Tetsuya Fujii | 24 | 1960–pres. | T. Fujii | (4343) |
| Toshimasa Furuta | 82 | n.a. | T. Furuta | — |
| Adrián Galád | 89 | 1970–pres. | A. Galád; A. Galad | (32008) |
| Gordon J. Garradd | 39 | 1959–pres. | G. J. Garradd | (5066) |
| Bruce L. Gary | 1 | 1939–pres. | B. Gary | (86279) |
| Tom Gehrels | 4625 | 1925–2011 | T. Gehrels | (1777) |
| Alex R. Gibbs | 1 | 1967–pres. | A. R. Gibbs | (14220) |
| Henry L. Giclas | 17 | 1910–2007 | H. L. Giclas | (1741) |
| Alan C. Gilmore | 44 | n.a. | A. C. Gilmore | (2537) |
| Brett J. Gladman | 25 | 1966–pres. | B. Gladman | (7638) |
| Hermann Goldschmidt | 14 | 1802–1866 | H. Goldschmidt | (1614) |
| François Gonnessiat | 2 | 1856–1934 | F. Gonnessiat | (1177) |
| Vittorio Goretti | 32 | 1939–2016 | V. Goretti | (7801) |
| Paul Götz | 20 | 1883–1962 | P. Götz; P. Gotz | (2278) |
| Andrew Graham | 1 | 1815–1908 | A. Graham | — |
| Tommy Grav | 4 | 1973–pres. | T. Grav | (12309) |
| Markus Griesser (astronomer) | 10 | 1949–pres. | M. Griesser | (11547) |
| Ian P. Griffin | 33 | 1958–pres. | I. P. Griffin; I. Griffin | — |
| Gavril Grueff | 1 | n.a. | G. Grueff | — |
| Daria Guidetti | 2 | 1978–pres. | D. Guidetti | (27005) |
| Cynthia Gustava | 4 | n.a. | C. Gustava | — |
| Knut Anton Walter Gyllenberg | 1 | 1886–1952 | K. Gyllenberg | — |
| Karl Ludwig Harding | 1 | 1765–1843 | K. Harding | (2003) |
| Eugene Albert Harlan | 2 | 1921–2014 | E. A. Harlan | — |
| Malcolm Hartley | 3 | 1947–pres. | M. Hartley | (4768) |
| Johannes Franz Hartmann | 3 | 1865–1936 | J. Hartmann | — |
| Takashi Hasegawa | 1 | n.a. | T. Hasegawa | — |
| David Healy | 279 | 1936–2011 | D. Healy | (66479) |
| Zsuzsanna Heiner | 19 | 1949–pres. | Z. Heiner | — |
| Joseph Helffrich | 13 | 1890–1971 | J. Helffrich | (2290) |
| Eleanor F. Helin | 920 | 1932–2009 | E. F. Helin | (3267) |
| Karl Ludwig Hencke | 2 | 1793–1866 | K. L. Hencke | (2005) |
| Arne Henden | 1 | 1950–pres. | A. Henden | (33529) |
| Prosper-Mathieu Henry | 7 | 1849–1903 | P. M. Henry | — |
| Paul-Pierre Henry | 7 | 1848–1905 | P. P. Henry | (1516) |
| Carl W. Hergenrother | 33 | 1973–pres. | C. W. Hergenrother | (3099) |
| Kenneth E. Herkenhoff | 2 | n.a. | K. Herkenhoff | — |
| Ejnar Hertzsprung | 2 | 1873–1967 | E. Hertzsprung | (1693) |
| Richard Erik Hill | 7 | 1949–pres. | R. Hill | (118945) |
| John Russell Hind | 10 | 1823–1895 | J. R. Hind | (1897) |
| Masanori Hirasawa | 52 | n.a. | M. Hirasawa | — |
| Sebastian F. Hönig | 585 | 1977–pres. | S. F. Hönig; S. F. Hoenig; S. Hoenig | (51983) |
| Cuno Hoffmeister | 5 | 1892–1968 | C. Hoffmeister | (1726), (4183) |
| Matthew J. Holman | 14 | 1967–pres. | M. J. Holman | (3666) |
| Robert Holmes | 395 | 1956–pres. | R. Holmes | (5477) |
| Henry E. Holt | 688 | 1929–2019 | H. E. Holt | (4435) |
| Paulo R. Holvorcem | 824 | 1967–pres. | P. R. Holvorcem | (13421) |
| Felix Hormuth | 246 | 1975–pres. | F. Hormuth | (10660) |
| Kamil Hornoch | 4 | 1972–pres. | K. Hornoch | (14124) |
| Léo Houziaux | 3 | 1932–pres. | L. Houziaux | (24945) |
| Edwin Hubble | 1 | 1889–1953 | E. Hubble | (2069) |
| John Huchra | 1 | 1948–2010 | J. Huchra | (4656) |
| Gary Hug | 433 | n.a. | G. Hug | — |
| Kiichirō Furukawa | 92 | 1929–2016 | K. Furukawa; K. Hurukawa | (3425) |
| Kustaa Aadolf Inkeri | 1 | 1908–1997 | K. Inkeri | — |
| Shigeru Inoda | 17 | 1955–2008 | S. Inoda | (5484) |
| Mike Irwin | 8 | n.a. | M. J. Irwin | — |
| Kōichi Itagaki | 3 | 1947–pres. | K. Itagaki | (14551) |
| Kazuyuki Itō | 1 | n.a. | K. Itō; K. Ito | — |
| Miguel Itzigsohn | 15 | ?–1978 | M. Itzigsohn | (1596) |
| Violeta G. Ivanova | 14 | n.a. | V. G. Ivanova; V. Ivanova | (4365) |
| Jurij Mykolajovyč Ivaščenko | 43 | 1961–pres. | Y. Ivaščenko; Y. Ivashchenko | — |
| Masayuki Iwamoto | 6 | 1954–pres. | M. Iwamoto | (4951) |
| Shun-ei Izumikawa | 2 | n.a. | S. Izumikawa | — |
| Cyril Jackson | 72 | 1903–1988 | C. Jackson | (2193) |
| Cristóvão Jacques (astronomer) | 7 | n.a. | C. Jacques | — |
| Jost Jahn | 18 | 1959–pres. | J. Jahn | (10340) |
| Robert Jedicke | 54 | 1963–pres. | R. Jedicke | (5899) |
| Hamilton Jeffers | 1 | 1893–1976 | H. M. Jeffers | (1934) |
| Benjamin Jekhowsky | 12 | 1881–1975 | B. Jekhovsky | (1606) |
| Poul Jensen | 98 | n.a. | P. Jensen | (5900) |
| David C. Jewitt | 57 | 1958–pres. | D. C. Jewitt | (6434) |
| Ernest Leonard Johnson | 18 | ?–1977 | E. L. Johnson | — |
| Amy B. Jordan | 1 | n.a. | A. B. Jordan | — |
| Charles W. Juels | 475 | 1944–2009 | C. W. Juels | (20135) |
| Mario Jurić | 125 | 1979–pres. | M. Jurić; M. Juric | — |
| Tetsuo Kagawa | 115 | 1969–pres. | T. Kagawa | (6665) |
| Franz Kaiser | 21 | 1891–1962 | F. Kaiser | (3183) |
| Dušan Kalmančok | 7 | 1945–pres. | D. Kalmančok; D. Kalmancok | (29824) |
| Karl Walter Kamper | 3 | 1941–1998 | K. W. Kamper | — |
| Kiyotaka Kanai | 1 | 1951–pres. | K. Kanai | (26168) |
| Jens Kandler | 26 | 1973–pres. | J. Kandler | (8861) |
| Hiroshi Kaneda | 705 | 1953–pres. | H. Kaneda | (4677) |
| Lyudmila Karachkina | 130 | 1948–pres. | L. G. Karachkina | (8019) |
| Galina Ričardovna Kastelʹ | 9 | n.a. | G. R. Kastelʹ; G. R. Kastel' | (3982) |
| John J. Kavelaars | 16 | 1966–pres. | J. J. Kavelaars; J. Kavelaars | (154660) |
| Kōyō Kawanishi | 13 | 1959–pres. | K. Kawanishi | (5591) |
| Nobuhiro Kawasato | 105 | n.a. | N. Kawasato | (4910) |
| James Edward Keeler | 2 | 1857–1900 | J. E. Keeler | (2261) |
| Pamela M. Kilmartin | 41 | n.a. | P. M. Kilmartin | (3907) |
| László L. Kiss | 89 | 1972–pres. | L. Kiss | (113202) |
| Minoru Kizawa | 12 | 1947–pres. | M. Kizawa | — |
| Arnold Richard Klemola | 16 | 1931–2019 | A. R. Klemola | (1723) |
| Rainer Kling | 104 | 1952–pres. | R. Kling | (185639) |
| Zoran Knežević | 1 | 1949–pres. | Z. Knežević; Z. Knezevic | (3900) |
| André Knöfel | 32 | 1963–pres. | A. Knöfel; A. Knofel; A. Kn\"ofel | (16438) |
| Viktor Knorre | 4 | 1840–1919 | V. Knorre | (14339) |
| Takao Kobayashi | 2479 | 1961–pres. | T. Kobayashi | (3500) |
| Peter Kocher | 138 | 1939–2025 | P. Kocher | (115950) |
| Luboš Kohoutek | 76 | 1935–2023 | L. Kohoutek | (1850) |
| Masahiro Koishikawa | 19 | 1952–pres. | M. Koishikawa | (6097) |
| Takuo Kojima | 45 | 1955–pres. | T. Kojima | (3644) |
| Peter Kolény | 35 | n.a. | P. Kolény; P. Koleny | — |
| August Kopff | 68 | 1882–1960 | A. Kopff | (1631) |
| Korado Korlević | 1295 | 1958–pres. | K. Korlević; K. Korlevic | (10201) |
| Leonard Kornoš | 37 | 1956–pres. | L. Kornoš; L. Kornos | (23899) |
| Hiroki Kosai | 93 | 1933–pres. | H. Kosai | (3370) |
| Lenka Kotková | 262 | 1973–pres. | L. Kotková; L. Sarounova; L. Šarounová | (10390) |
| Charles T. Kowal | 24 | 1940–2011 | C. T. Kowal | — |
| Richard Kowalski | 1 | 1963–pres. | R. A. Kowalski | (7392) |
| Rainer Kracht | 5 | 1948–pres. | R. Kracht | (234761) |
| Timur Valer'evič Krjačko | 219 | 1970–pres. | T. V. Krjačko; T. V. Kryachko; T. Kryachko c. Kryachko | (269589) |
| Marcin Kubiak | 1 | n.a. | Kubiak | — |
| Kazuo Kubokawa | 1 | 1903–1943 | K. Kubokawa | (6140) |
| György Kulin | 21 | 1905–1989 | G. Kulin | (3019) |
| Nikolaj Efimovič Kuročkin | 2 | 1923–2003 | N. E. Kuročkin; N. E. Kurochkin | — |
| Reiki Kushida | 1 | n.a. | R. Kushida | (5239) |
| Yoshio Kushida | 56 | 1957–pres. | Y. Kushida | (5605) |
| Peter Kušnirák | 310 | 1974–pres. | P. Kušnirák; P. Kusnirak | (17260) |
| Claes-Ingvar Lagerkvist | 168 | 1944–pres. | C.-I. Lagerkvist | (2875) |
| Joanny-Philippe Lagrula | 1 | 1870–1941 | J. Lagrula | (1412) |
| Carl Otto Lampland | 1 | 1873–1951 | C. O. Lampland | (1767) |
| Werner Landgraf | 7 | 1959–pres. | W. Landgraf | (3132) |
| Jeffrey A. Larsen | 2 | 1967–pres. | J. A. Larsen | (7657) |
| Stephen M. Larson | 2 | n.a. | S. M. Larson | (3690) |
| Tod R. Lauer | 3 | 1957–pres. | T. Lauer | (3135) |
| Vygandas Laugalys | 15 | 1972–pres. | V. Laugalys | (353404) |
| Marguerite Laugier | 21 | 1896–1976 | M. Laugier | (1597) |
| Joseph Jean Pierre Laurent | 1 | 1823–1900 | J. J. P. Laurent | (162) |
| Stephen P. Laurie | 50 | n.a. | S. P. Laurie | — |
| Kenneth J. Lawrence | 34 | 1964–pres. | K. J. Lawrence | (4969) |
| Susannah Lazar | 1 | 1982–pres. | S. Lazar | — |
| Charles le Morvan | 1 | 1865–1933 | C. le Morvan | — |
| Gerhard Lehmann | 35 | 1960–pres. | G. Lehmann | (8853) |
| Gregory J. Leonard | 11 | 1963–pres. | G. J. Leonard | (53435) |
| Otto Lesser | 1 | 1830–1887 | O. Lesser | — |
| David H. Levy | 65 | 1948–pres. | D. H. Levy; D. Levy | (3673) |
| William Liller | 2 | 1927–2021 | W. Liller | (3222) |
| Robert Linderholm | 27 | 1933–2013 | R. Linderholm | — |
| Álvaro López-García | 12 | 1941–pres. | Á. López-G. A. Lopez | (4657) |
| Ángel López Jiménez | 58 | 1955–pres. | Á. López J. A. Lopez | (19506) |
| Karl Wilhelm Lorenz | 4 | 1886–1918 | W. Lorenz | — |
| Miklós Lovas | 2 | 1931–pres. | M. Lovas | (73511) |
| Jessica Lovering | 1 | n.a. | J. R. Lovering | — |
| Percival Lowell | 1 | 1855–1916 | P. Lowell | (1886) |
| Robert Luther | 24 | 1822–1900 | R. Luther | (1303) |
| Jane Luu | 42 | 1963–pres. | J. X. Luu | (5430) |
| Renu Malhotra | 1 | 1961–pres. | R. Malhotra | (6698) |
| Franco Mallia | 17 | 1961–pres. | F. Mallia | (21685) |
| Francesco Manca | 26 | 1966–pres. | F. Manca | (15460) |
| Brian G. W. Manning | 19 | 1926–2011 | B. G. W. Manning | (3698) |
| Brian G. Marsden | 1 | 1937–2010 | B. G. Marsden | (1877) |
| Albert Marth | 1 | 1828–1897 | A. Marth | — |
| Gianluca Masi | 31 | 1972–pres. | G. Masi | (21795) |
| Adam Massinger | 7 | 1888–1914 | A. Massinger | (760) |
| Robert D. Matson | 208 | 1962–pres. | R. Matson | (73491) |
| Alain Maury | 14 | 1958–pres. | A. Maury | (3780) |
| Michele Mazzucato | 13 | 1962–pres. | M. Mazzucato | (35461) |
| John V. McClusky | 160 | n.a. | J. V. McClusky; J. McClusky | — |
| Robert H. McNaught | 511 | 1956–pres. | R. H. McNaught | (3173) |
| Jeffrey S. Medkeff | 10 | 1968–2008 | J. Medkeff | (41450) |
| Karen Jean Meech | 6 | 1959–pres. | K. J. Meech; K. Meech | (4367) |
| Philibert Jacques Melotte | 1 | 1880–1961 | P. Melotte | — |
| Jean-Claude Merlin | 93 | 1954–pres. | J.-C. Merlin | (57658) |
| Joel Hastings Metcalf | 41 | 1866–1925 | J. H. Metcalf | (726), (792) |
| Erich Meyer | 23 | 1951–pres. | E. Meyer | (7940) |
| Maik Meyer | 16 | 1970–pres. | M. Meyer | (52005) |
| Marco Micheli | 76 | 1983–pres. | M. Micheli | (10277) |
| Elia Millosevich | 2 | 1848–1919 | E. Millosevich | (69961) |
| Rudolph Minkowski | 1 | 1895–1976 | R. Minkowski | (11770) |
| Seidai Miyasaka | 4 | 1955–pres. | S. Miyasaka | (3555) |
| Yoshikane Mizuno | 52 | 1954–pres. | Y. Mizuno | (4541) |
| Lawrence Alan Molnar | 116 | 1959–pres. | L. A. Molnar; L. Molnar | (8245) |
| Zdeněk Moravec | 98 | 1968–pres. | Z. Moravec | — |
| Hiroshi Mori | 45 | 1958–pres. | H. Mori | (19190) |
| Patrick M. Motl | 9 | n.a. | P. M. Motl | — |
| Antonín Mrkos | 273 | 1918–1996 | A. Mrkos | (1832) |
| Jean Mueller | 13 | 1950–pres. | J. E. Mueller | (4031) |
| Masaru Mukai | 13 | 1949–pres. | M. Mukai | — |
| John Derral Mulholland | 1 | 1934–2008 | J. D. Mulholland | — |
| Ulisse Munari | 49 | 1960–pres. | U. Munari | (7599) |
| Osamu Muramatsu | 73 | 1949–pres. | O. Muramatsu | (5606) |
| Akimasa Nakamura | 112 | 1961–pres. | A. Nakamura | (10633) |
| Grigory Neujmin | 74 | 1885–1946 | G. N. Neujmin | (1129) |
| Phil Nicholson | 1 | 1951–pres. | P. Nicholson | (7220) |
| Seth Barnes Nicholson | 2 | 1891–1963 | S. B. Nicholson | (1831) |
| Tsuneo Niijima | 32 | 1955–pres. | T. Niijima | (5507) |
| Jaume Nomen | 55 | 1960–pres. | J. Nomen | (56561) |
| Toshiro Nomura | 13 | 1954–pres. | T. Nomura | (6559) |
| Artyom Novichonok | 40 | 1988–pres. | A. Novichonok; A. O. Novichonok | — |
| Erwin Obermair | 7 | 1946–2017 | E. Obermair | (9236) |
| Warren B. Offutt | 18 | 1928–2017 | W. Offutt | (7639) |
| Okuro Oikawa | 8 | 1896–1980 | O. Oikawa | (2667) |
| Gregory Wayne Ojakangas | 2 | n.a. | G. Ojakangas | — |
| Arto Oksanen | 1 | n.a. | A. Oksanen | — |
| Tomimaru Okuni | 130 | 1931–pres. | T. Okuni | (7769) |
| Heinrich Wilhelm Matthias Olbers | 2 | 1758–1840 | H. W. Olbers | (1002) |
| C. Michelle Olmstead | 46 | 1969–pres. | C. M. Olmstead | (3287) |
| José Luis Ortiz Moreno | 8 | 1967–pres. | J. L. Ortiz | (4436) |
| Michel Ory | 364 | 1966–pres. | M. Ory | (67979) |
| Yoshiaki Oshima | 61 | 1952–pres. | Y. Oshima | (5592) |
| Liisi Oterma | 54 | 1915–2001 | L. Oterma | (1529) |
| Satoru Otomo | 148 | 1957–pres. | S. Otomo | (3911) |
| Rafael Pacheco | 57 | 1954–pres. | R. Pacheco | (25001) |
| Johann Palisa | 122 | 1848–1925 | J. Palisa | (914) |
| André Patry | 9 | 1902–1967 | A. Patry | (1601) |
| Thierry Pauwels | 161 | 1957–pres. | T. Pauwels | (12761) |
| Fernando Pedichini | 1 | n.a. | F. Pedichini | — |
| Henri Joseph Anastase Perrotin | 6 | 1845–1904 | J. Perrotin | (1515) |
| Christian Heinrich Friedrich Peters | 48 | 1813–1890 | C. H. F. Peters | (100007) |
| George Henry Peters | 3 | 1863–1947 | G. H. Peters | — |
| Giuseppe Piazzi | 1 | 1746–1826 | G. Piazzi | (1000) |
| Guido Pizarro (astronomer) | 8 | n.a. | G. Pizarro | (4609) |
| John Platt | 2 | 1963–pres. | J. Platt | — |
| N. R. Pogson | 8 | 1829–1891 | N. R. Pogson | (1830) |
| Christian Pollas | 26 | 1947–pres. | C. Pollas | (4892) |
| Hejno Iogannović Potter | 1 | 1929–2007 | H. Potter | (7320) |
| Petr Pravec | 372 | 1967–pres. | P. Pravec | (4790) |
| Milorad B. Protić | 7 | 1911–2001 | M. B. Protić; M. B. Protitch | (22278) |
| Herbert Raab | 1 | 1969–pres. | H. Raab | (3184) |
| David L. Rabinowitz | 52 | 1960–pres. | D. L. Rabinowitz; D. Rabinowitz | (5040) |
| David Rankin | 4 | 1984–pres. | D. Rankin | (62701) |
| Karl Wilhelm Reinmuth | 395 | 1892–1979 | K. Reinmuth | (1111) |
| Guy Reiss | 5 | 1904–1964 | G. Reiss | (1577) |
| Joseph Rheden | 3 | 1873–1946 | J. Rheden | — |
| Wolfgang Ries | 206 | 1968–pres. | W. Ries | (266887) |
| Fernand Rigaux | 8 | 1905–1962 | F. Rigaux | (19911) |
| Claudine Rinner | 393 | 1965–pres. | C. Rinner | (23999) |
| Elizabeth Roemer | 2 | 1929–2016 | E. Roemer | (1657) |
| Brian P. Roman | 11 | n.a. | B. Roman | (4575) |
| René Roy (astronomer) | 9 | 1938–pres. | R. Roy | (14533) |
| Kenneth S. Russell | 6 | n.a. | K. S. Russell | (3714) |
| Allan Sandage | 1 | 1926–2010 | A. R. Sandage | (9963) |
| Hans-Ullrich Sandig | 1 | 1909–1979 | H.-U. Sandig | — |
| Luigi Sannino | 2 | 1981–pres. | L. Sannino | (58691) |
| Krisztián Sárneczky | 1371 | 1974–pres. | K. Sárneczky; K. Sarneczky; K. S\'arneczky | (10258) |
| Naoto Satō | 143 | 1953–pres. | N. Satō; N. Sato | (6025) |
| Ann Savage | 1 | 1946–2017 | A. Savage | — |
| Alexandre Schaumasse | 2 | 1882–1958 | A. Schaumasse | (1797) |
| Giovanni Schiaparelli | 1 | 1835–1910 | G. Schiaparelli | (4062) |
| Lutz D. Schmadel | 244 | 1942–2016 | L. D. Schmadel; L.D. Schmadel | (2234) |
| Brian Schmidt | 2 | 1967–pres. | B. Schmidt | (233292) |
| Alfred Schmitt | 4 | 1907–1973 | A. Schmitt | (1617) |
| Hans Scholl | 64 | 1942–pres. | H. Scholl | (2959) |
| Richard Schorr | 2 | 1867–1951 | R. Schorr | (1235) |
| Joachim Schubart | 2 | 1928–pres. | J. Schubart | (1911) |
| Lipót Schulhof | 1 | 1847–1921 | L. Schulhof | (2384) |
| Hans-Emil Schuster | 25 | 1934–pres. | H.-E. Schuster | (2018) |
| Erwin Schwab | 113 | 1964–pres. | E. Schwab | (185638) |
| Megan Schwamb | 32 | 1984–pres. | M. E. Schwamb; M. Schwamb | (11814) |
| Michael B. Schwartz | 653 | 1950–pres. | M. Schwartz | (13820) |
| Friedrich Karl Arnold Schwassmann | 22 | 1870–1964 | A. Schwassmann | (989) |
| George Mary Searle | 1 | 1839–1918 | G. Searle | — |
| William Lawrence Sebok | 2 | n.a. | W. Sebok | — |
| Sadao Sei | 1 | n.a. | S. Sei | — |
| Nalin Samarasinha | 2 | 1958–pres. | N. Samarasinha | (12871) |
| Tsutomu Seki | 225 | 1930–pres. | T. Seki | (3426) |
| Grigory Shajn | 3 | 1892–1956 | G. Shajn | (1648) |
| Pelageya Shajn | 19 | 1894–1956 | P. F. Shajn | (1190), (1648) |
| Scott S. Sheppard | 41 | 1977–pres. | S. S. Sheppard; S. Sheppard | (17898) |
| Yoshisada Shimizu | 311 | 1943–pres. | Y. Shimizu | (7300) |
| Vladimir Shkodrov | 7 | 1930–2010 | V. G. Shkodrov; V. Shkodrov | (4364) |
| Carolyn S. Shoemaker | 380 | 1929–2021 | C. S. Shoemaker | (4446) |
| Eugene Merle Shoemaker | 188 | 1928–1997 | E. M. Shoemaker | (2074) |
| Piero Sicoli | 43 | 1954–pres. | P. Sicoli | (7866) |
| Stephen Singer-Brewster | 7 | 1945–pres. | S. Singer-Brewster; S. C. Brewster | (10315) |
| Brigitta Sipőcz | 52 | 1984–pres. | B. Sipőcz; B. Sipocz; B. Sip\ Hocz | — |
| Brian A. Skiff | 67 | n.a. | B. A. Skiff | (2554) |
| Tamara Smirnova | 135 | 1935–2001 | T. M. Smirnova | (5540) |
| Giovanni Sostero | 3 | 1964–2012 | G. Sostero | (9878) |
| Guy Soulié | 2 | 1920–pres. | G. Soulié; G. Soulie | (13226) |
| Timothy B. Spahr | 63 | 1970–pres. | T. B. Spahr | (2975) |
| Stefano Sposetti | 172 | 1958–pres. | S. Sposetti | (22354) |
| Tom Stafford | 40 | n.a. | T. Stafford | — |
| Anton Staus | 1 | 1872–1955 | A. Staus | — |
| Duncan Steel | 12 | 1955–pres. | D. I. Steel | (4713) |
| Édouard Stephan | 2 | 1837–1923 | É. Stephan; E. Stephan | — |
| DeLisle Stewart | 1 | 1870–1941 | D. Stewart | — |
| Jürgen Stock | 3 | 1923–2004 | J. Stock | (4388) |
| Gyula Strommer | 1 | 1920–1995 | G. Strommer | (254876) |
| Otto Struve | 2 | 1897–1963 | O. Struve | (2227) |
| Matsuo Sugano | 4 | 1939–pres. | M. Sugano | (5872) |
| Atsushi Sugie | 122 | n.a. | A. Sugie | (3957) |
| Rafael Suvanto | 1 | 1909–1940 | R. Suvanto | (1927) |
| Kenzo Suzuki | 42 | 1950–pres. | K. Suzuki | (5526) |
| Shōhei Suzuki | 52 | n.a. | S. Suzuki | — |
| Frédéric Sy | 2 | 1861–1917 | F. Sy | (1714) |
| Atsushi Takahashi | 22 | 1965–pres. | A. Takahashi | (4842) |
| Wilhelm Tempel | 5 | 1821–1889 | E. W. Tempel | (3808) |
| Luciano Tesi | 201 | 1931–pres. | L. Tesi | (15817) |
| Augusto Testa | 31 | 1950–pres. | A. Testa | (11667) |
| Holger Thiele | 4 | 1878–1946 | H. Thiele | (1586) |
| David J. Tholen | 105 | 1955–pres. | D. J. Tholen | (3255) |
| Norman G. Thomas | 55 | 1930–pres. | N. G. Thomas | (2555) |
| Jana Tichá | 123 | 1965–pres. | J. Tichá; J. Ticha; J. Tich\'a | (5757) |
| Miloš Tichý | 251 | 1966–pres. | M. Tichý; M. Tichy; M. Tich\'y | (3337) |
| Friedrich Tietjen | 1 | 1832–1895 | F. Tietjen | (2158) |
| Clyde Tombaugh | 15 | 1906–1997 | C. W. Tombaugh | (1604) |
| Maura Tombelli | 212 | 1952–pres. | M. Tombelli | (9904) |
| Kōichirō Tomita | 9 | 1925–2006 | K. Tomita | (2391) |
| John L. Tonry | 2 | 1953–pres. | J. L. Tonry | (40919) |
| Carlos Torres | 38 | 1929–2011 | C. Torres | (1769) |
| Juraj Tóth | 16 | 1975–pres. | J. Tóth; J. Toth | (24976) |
| Suzanne W. Tourtellotte | 15 | 1945–2013 | S. Tourtellotte | — |
| Chad Trujillo | 77 | 1973–pres. | C. A. Trujillo; C. Trujillo; C. W. Trujillo and Trujillo | (12101) |
| Roy A. Tucker | 805 | 1951–pres. | R. A. Tucker; R. Tucker; R.A. Tucker | (10914) |
| Horace Parnell Tuttle | 2 | 1837–1923 | H. P. Tuttle | (5036) |
| Andrzej Udalski | 2 | 1957–pres. | A. Udalski | — |
| Seiji Ueda | 705 | 1952–pres. | S. Ueda | (4676) |
| Takeshi Urata | 642 | 1947–2012 | T. Urata | (3722) |
| Fumiaki Uto | 21 | n.a. | F. Uto | (37693) |
| Antonio Vagnozzi | 47 | 1950–pres. | A. Vagnozzi | (7529) |
| Marja Väisälä | 2 | 1916–2011 | M. Väisälä; M. Vaisala | — |
| Yrjö Väisälä | 128 | 1891–1971 | Y. Väisälä; Y. Vaisala | (1573), (2804) |
| George Van Biesbroeck | 16 | 1880–1974 | G. Van Biesbroeck | (1781) |
| Hendrik van Gent | 39 | 1899–1947 | H. van Gent | (1666) |
| Cornelis Johannes van Houten | 4718 | 1920–2002 | C. J. van Houten | (1673) |
| Ingrid van Houten-Groeneveld | 4719 | 1921–2015 | I. van Houten-Groeneveld; I. Groeneveld | (1674) |
| Andrew Vanden Heuvel | 6 | n.a. | A. Vanden Heuvel; A. V. Heuvel | — |
| Zdeňka Vávrová | 116 | 1945–pres. | Z. Vávrová; Z. Vavrova | (3364) |
| Walter Augustin Villiger | 1 | 1872–1938 | W. Villiger | (1310) |
| George R. Viscome | 33 | 1956–pres. | G. R. Viscome | (6183) |
| Heinrich Vogt | 1 | 1890–1968 | H. Vogt | (1439) |
| Luigi Volta | 5 | 1876–1952 | L. Volta | (383622) |
| Tomáš Vorobjov | 42 | 1984–pres. | T. Vorobjov | (4858) |
| Arno Arthur Wachmann | 3 | 1902–1990 | A. Wachmann | (1704) |
| Duncan Waldron | 2 | n.a. | J. D. Waldron | — |
| Åke Wallenquist | 1 | 1904–1994 | Å. A. E. Wallenquist; A. A. E. Wallenquist | (2114) |
| Brian D. Warner | 3 | 1952–pres. | B. D. Warner | (8734) |
| Kazuro Watanabe | 671 | 1955–pres. | K. Watanabe | (4155) |
| James Craig Watson | 22 | 1838–1880 | J. C. Watson | (729) |
| Robert Weber | 8 | 1926–2008 | R. Weber | (6181) |
| Wolfgang Wenzel (astronomer) | 1 | 1929–2021 | W. Wenzel | (58607) |
| Richard Martin West | 40 | 1941–pres. | R. M. West | (2022) |
| Fred Lawrence Whipple | 1 | 1906–2004 | F. L. Whipple | (1940) |
| Paul Wiegert | 683 | 1967–pres. | P. A. Wiegert | (15068) |
| Patrick Wiggins | 5 | 1949–pres. | P. Wiggins | (4099) |
| Paul Wild | 94 | 1925–2014 | P. Wild | (1941) |
| Albert George Wilson | 5 | 1918–2012 | A. G. Wilson | (4015) |
| Carl A. Wirtanen | 8 | 1910–1990 | C. A. Wirtanen | (2044) |
| Carl Gustav Witt | 2 | 1866–1946 | G. Witt | (2732) |
| Marek Wolf | 20 | 1957–pres. | M. Wolf | — |
| Max Wolf | 248 | 1863–1932 | M. F. Wolf | (827) |
| Harry Edwin Wood | 12 | 1881–1946 | H. E. Wood | (1660) |
| Gao Xing | 26 | 1974–pres. | X. Gao | (204710) |
| Masayuki Yanai | 27 | 1959–pres. | M. Yanai | (4260) |
| Quanzhi Ye | 215 | 1988–pres | Q. Ye; Q.-z. Ye; Q.-Z. Ye | (10280) |
| William Kwong Yu Yeung | 2094 | 1960–pres. | W. K. Y. Yeung; W. K. Yeung | (40776) |
| James Whitney Young | 310 | 1941–pres. | J. W. Young; J. Young | (2874) |
| Vincenzo Zappalà | 9 | 1945–pres. | V. Zappalà; V. Zappala | (2813) |
| Lyudmila Zhuravleva | 213 | 1946–pres. | L. V. Zhuravleva | (26087) |
| Frank B. Zoltowski | 230 | 1957–pres. | F. B. Zoltowski | (18292) |
| Anna N. Żytkow | 7 | 1947–pres. | A. Żytkow; A. Zytkow | — |

back to top

== Discovering institutions ==
Many discoveries are credited to an institution, like an observatory, rather than to one or several individuals.

The table consist of the following fields:

- Institution: links to the corresponding article about the discovering observatory on Wikipedia.
- Discoveries: displays the total number of discovered and co-discovered minor planets made by the observatory (numbered bodies only). It links to the corresponding "Discovery by..." category, which are subcategories of Category:Astronomical discoveries by institution. These categories do not contain discoveries for which no page on Wikipedia exists. Observatories with only a few discoveries sometimes do not have their own discovery-category (redlinks). For those who have discovered only one single minor planet, the link in the discovery column directly points to the corresponding entry in the list of minor planets.
- Observatory code: displays the alphanumeric IAU code(s) for the institution.
- Name(s) at MPC: displays the name of the observatory as used by the MPC. Some institutions have multiple names due to inconsistencies and typos. The first name listed is used in all lists of minor planets. Shorter names should generally be placed first.

Only observatories/institutions that are notable and have their own Wikipedia article are included.

| Institution | Discoveries | Obs. code | Name(s) at MPC |
|---|---|---|---|
| Air Force Maui Optical and Supercomputing observatory | 98 | 608, 605 | AMOS |
| Ametlla de Mar Observatory | 12 | 946 | Ametlla de Mar |
| Andrushivka Astronomical Observatory | 125 | A50 | Andrushivka |
| Apache Point Observatory | 16 | 645 | Apache Point |
| Asiago Observatory | 4 | 098 | Cima Ekar |
| Asiago-DLR Asteroid Survey | 14 | 209 | ADAS; Asiago-DLR Asteroid Survey |
| Asteroid Terrestrial-impact Last Alert System | 15 | T05, T08; M22, W68 | ATLAS; ATLAS-HKO, Haleaka; ATLAS-MLO, Mauna L |
| Stardome Observatory | 1 | 466, 467 | Auckland |
| Bisei Asteroid Tracking Telescope for Rapid Survey | 511 | 300 | BATTeRS; Bisei SG Center |
| Badlands Observatory | 7 | 918 | Badlands |
| Highland Road Park Observatory | 1 | 747 | Baton Rouge |
| Beijing Schmidt CCD Asteroid Program | 1304 | 327 | SCAP; Beijing Schmidt CCD Asteroid Program; NAOC Schmidt CCD Asteroid Program |
| Bergisch Gladbach Observatory | 6 | 621 | Bergisch Gladbach |
| Bok Telescope | 91 | V00 | Bok NEO Survey; Kitt Peak-Bok |
| Boyden Observatory | 4 | 074 | Boyden Observatory |
| Bulgarian National Observatory | 12 | 071 | Bulgarian National Observatory |
| CERGA Observatory | 21 | 010 | CERGA |
| Catalina Sky Survey | 36769 | 703 | CSS |
| Calar Alto Observatory | 19 | 493 | Calar Alto |
| Calvin–Rehoboth Observatory | 115 | G98 | Calvin College; Prairie School |
| Campo Imperatore Near Earth Object Survey | 1926 | 599 | CINEOS; Campo Imperatore; Campo Imperatore Near Earth Object Survey |
| Catalina Station | 1 | 693 | Catalina Station |
| Cerro El Roble Observatory | 1 | 805 | Cerro El Roble |
| Paranal Observatory | 6 | 309 | Cerro Paranal |
| Cerro Tololo Inter-American Observatory | 70 | 807 | Cerro Tololo |
| Copenhagen University Observatory | 8 | 035 | Copenhagen Observatory |
| COIAS | 11 | T09 | COIAS |
| Cordell–Lorenz Observatory | 30 | 850 | Cordell-Lorenz |
| Crimean Astrophysical Observatory | 13 | 095 | Crimean Astrophysical Observatory |
| Črni Vrh Observatory | 12 | 106 | Črni Vrh; Crni Vrh |
| Dark Energy Camera | 2438 | W84 | DECam; Cerro Tololo-DECam; DECam NEO Survey |
| Dark Energy Survey | 3 | W84 | Dark Energy Survey |
| Deep Ecliptic Survey | 2227 | 695 | Deep Ecliptic Survey |
| Deep Lens Survey | 295 | 807 | Deep Lens Survey |
| Drebach Observatory | 16 | 113 | Drebach; Volkssternwarte Drebach |
| European Near Earth Asteroids Research | 101 | 809 | EURONEAR |
| Farpoint Observatory | 137 | 734 | Farpoint; Eskridge |
| European Southern Observatory | 2 | 809 | ESO; European Southern Observatory |
| Faulkes Telescope Educational Project | 3 | 608 | Faulkes Telescope Educational Project |
| Faulkes Telescope North | 10 | F65 | Haleakala |
| Félix Aguilar Observatory | 63 | 808 | Félix Aguilar Observatory; Felix Aguilar Observatory |
| Gaia (spacecraft) | 29 | 258 | Gaia-GBOT; Gaia Ground BaseODAS |
| Goodricke-Pigott Observatory | 72 | 683 | Goodricke-Pigott |
| Harvard College Observatory | 55 | 800, 802 | Harvard Observatory |
| Haute-Provence Observatory | 5 | 511 | Haute Provence; Institute d'Astrophysics |
| Hubble Space Telescope | 1 | 250 | Hubble Space Telescope |
| International Near-Earth Asteroid Survey | 8 | 675 | INAS |
| Infrared Astronomical Satellite | 4 | 500 | IRAS |
| International Scientific Optical Network | 10 | H15 | ISON |
| Indiana Asteroid Program | 119 | 760 | Indiana University |
| Japan Spaceguard Association | 1 | 381 | Japan Spaceguard Association |
| Junk Bond Observatory | 54 | 701 | Junk Bond |
| Jura Observatory | 1 | 185 | Vicques |
| Kepler Space Telescope | 1 | C55 | KEPLER |
| Klet Observatory near Earth and other unusual objects observations team and telescope | 41 | 246 | KLENOT |
| Kiso Observatory | 2 | 381 | Kiso |
| Kitt Peak National Observatory | 75 | 695 | Kitt Peak |
| Kleť Observatory | 301 | 046 | Kleť; Klet |
| Kvistaberg Observatory | 3 | 049 | Kvistaberg; Uppsala-Kvistaberg |
| Lincoln Near-Earth Asteroid Research | 153157 | 704 | LINEAR |
| Lowell Observatory Near-Earth-Object Search | 23454 | 688 | LONEOS; Lowell Observatory Near-Earth Asteroid Survey |
| Lulin Sky Survey | 522 | D35 | LUSS |
| Roque de los Muchachos Observatory | 58 | 950 | La Palma |
| La Plata Observatory | 5 | 839 | La Plata |
| La Silla Observatory | 74 | I05 | La Silla |
| Mount John University Observatory | 5 | 474 | Lake Tekapo |
| Las Campanas Observatory | 1 | 304 | Las Campanas |
| Lick Observatory | 1 | 662 | Lick Observatory |
| Lincoln Laboratory's Experimental Test Site | 22 | 704 | Lincoln Lab ETS; Lincoln Laboratory ETS; Socorro |
| Los Molinos Observatory | 2 | 844 | Los Molinos |
| Lowell Observatory | 3 | 690 | Lowell Observatory |
| Lowell Discovery Telescope | 1 | G37 | Flagstaff |
| Lulin Observatory | 4 | D35 | Lulin |
| OGS Telescope | 690 | J04 | ESA OGS; ESA Optical Ground Station |
| Consell Observatory | 2 | 176 | Consell |
| MASTER-SAAO Telescope | 1 | K95 | MASTER |
| Mauna Kea Observatories | 198 | 568 | Mauna Kea; Maunakea |
| iTelescope Observatory | 43 | H06, H10 | Mayhill |
| McDonald Observatory | 2 | 711, V37 | McDonald Observatory |
| Modra Observatory | 16 | 118 | Modra |
| Molėtai Astronomical Observatory | 12 | 152 | Molėtai; Moletai |
| Mount Lemmon Survey | 167501 | G96 | Mount Lemmon Survey; Mt. Lemmon Survey |
| Near-Earth Asteroid Tracking | 52000 | 566, 644 | NEAT; Haleakala-NEAT/GEO |
| Nachi-Katsuura Observatory | 1 | 905 | Nachi-Katsuura |
| SFA Observatory | 4 | 740 | Nacogdoches |
| New Horizons KBO Search | 2 | 250, 266–269 | New Horizons KBO Search; New Horizons Search Team |
| Nyrölän observatorio | 1 | 174 | Nyrölän; Nyrola |
| Astronomical Observatory of Mallorca | 3272 | 620, J75 | OAM; OAM Observatory; La Sagra; Observatorio Astronómico de Mallorca |
| OCA–DLR Asteroid Survey | 1051 | 910 | ODAS |
| Oak Ridge Observatory | 38 | 801 | Oak Ridge Observatory |
| Oakley Observatory | 4 | 916, E09 | Oakley |
| Observatory Naef Épendes | 24 | A13 | Observatoire Naef |
| Ondřejov Observatory | 25 | 557 | Ondrejov |
| Nihondaira Observatory Oohira Station | 6 | 385 | Oohira |
| San Vittore Observatory | 99 | 552 | San Vittore; Osservatorio San Vittore |
| Outer Solar System Origins Survey | 44 | 568 | OSSOS; Outer Solar System Origins Survey |
| Palomar Planet-Crossing Asteroid Survey | 20 | 675 | PCAS |
| PMO NEO Survey Program | 1019 | 330 | PMO NEO Survey Program; PMO Neo Survey Program |
| Palomar Observatory | 62 | 675 | Palomar; Palomar Mountain-D; Palomar Mountain |
| Palomar Transient Factory | 412 | I41 | Palomar Transient Factory |
| Pan-STARRS | 98373 | F51 | Pan-STARRS 1 Pan-STARRS1 |
| Pan-STARRS 2 | 1478 | F52 | Pan-STARRS 2 |
| Beijing Astronomical Observatory | 1 | 324, 327 | Peking Observatory |
| Perth Observatory | 29 | 319, 322 | Perth Observatory |
| Pises Observatory | 32 | 122 | Pises |
| Powell Observatory | 25 | 649 | Powell |
| Puckett Observatory | 1 | 752, 764 | Puckett |
| Purple Mountain Observatory | 149 | 330 | Purple Mountain; Purple Mountain Observatory |
| Royal Observatory Edinburgh | 7 | 277 | Royal Observatory Edinburgh |
| Santa Lucia Stroncone Astronomical Observatory | 55 | 589 | Santa Lucia; Stroncone |
| Saji Observatory | 23 | 867 | Saji |
| Pistoia Mountains Astronomical Observatory | 39 | 104 | San Marcello |
| National Astronomical Observatory (Mexico) | 1 | 679 | San Pedro Martir |
| Siding Spring Observatory | 5 | 413 | Siding Spring; Siding Spring-Faul; Spring-Faul, Siding |
| Siding Spring Survey | 4351 | E12 | SSS; Siding Spring Survey |
| Sierra Nevada Observatory | 4 | J86 | Sierra Nevada |
| Sloan Digital Sky Survey | 3616 | 645 | SDSS; Sloan Digital Sky Survey; Sloan Digital Sky Survey Linked Object Catalog team |
| Sormano Astronomical Observatory | 1 | 587 | Sormano |
| Spacewatch | 244648 | 691 | Spacewatch |
| Space Surveillance Telescope | 42 | G45 | Space Surveillance Telescope |
| Observatory of Saint-Veran | 58 | 615 | St. Veran; Observatoire de Saint-Véran |
| Starkenburg Observatory | 51 | 611 | Starkenburg; Heppenheim |
| Stony Ridge Observatory | 3 | 671 | Stony Ridge |
| Subaru Telescope | 44 | T09 | Subaru Telescope |
| Sutherland-LCO | 1 | K91, K92, K93 | Sutherland-LCO C |
| Table Mountain Observatory | 1 | 673, 673 | Wrightwood |
| Teide Observatory | 7 | 954 | Teide |
| Tenagra Observatory | 6 | 848 | Tenagra; Cottage Grove |
| Tenagra II Observatory | 113 | 926 | Tenagra II; Nogales |
| TRAPPIST | 2 | I40 | TRAPPIST |
| Uppsala–ESO Survey of Asteroids and Comets | 1132 | 809 | UESAC; UESAC, Comets |
| Royal Observatory of Belgium | 13 | 012 | Uccle |
| National Astronomical Observatory (Chile) | 3 | 805 | University of Chile |
| Uppsala–DLR Asteroid Survey | 278 | 049 | Uppsala-DLR Asteroid Survey |
| Uppsala–DLR Trojan Survey | 64 | 809 | Uppsala-DLR Trojan Survey |
| Vatican Advanced Technology Telescope | 10 | 290, G83 | Mount Graham |
| Višnjan Observatory | 108 | 120 | Višnjan; Visnjan |
| Wide-field Infrared Survey Explorer | 9963 | C51 | WISE |
| Wise Observatory | 19 | 097 | Wise |
| Xinglong Station (NAOC) | 4 | 327 | Xinglong; Peking |
| Zadko Observatory | 2 | D20 | Zadko |
| Zelenchukskaya Station | 15 | 114 | Zelenchukskaya Stn |
| Zwicky Transient Facility | 55 | I41 | Zwicky Transient Facility |

back to top

== See also ==
- List of observatory codes, a list of all observatories who have reported data to the Minor Planet Center
- Observations of small Solar System bodies
