= Patrick Wiggins (astronomer) =

American astronomer

Patrick Wiggins (born 1949) is an American amateur astronomer, and a discoverer of minor planets as well as supernovae. Wiggins worked as an educator at the Old Hansen Planetarium in Salt Lake City, Utah for 27 years before his retirement in 2002. As of 2021 he works for the University of Utah Department of Physics and Astronomy doing science outreach in the public schools. He is also a sky-diver and holds a pilot's license. As of 2025, he has logged more than 4,500 nights at the Stansbury Park Observatory near Tooele.

== Awards and honors ==
- In 2014, Wiggins received the NASA Distinguished Public Service Medal, the highest honor NASA awards to a non employee.
- Asteroid 4099 Wiggins, discovered by Henri Debehogne at La Silla Observatory in 1988, was named in his honor. The official naming citation was published by the Minor Planet Center on 6 January 2007 (M.P.C. 58593).
