= Meanings of minor-planet names: 14001–15000 =

As minor planet discoveries are confirmed, they are given a permanent number by the IAU's Minor Planet Center (MPC), and the discoverers can then submit names for them, following the IAU's naming conventions. The list below concerns those minor planets in the specified number-range that have received names, and explains the meanings of those names.

Official naming citations of newly named small Solar System bodies are approved and published in a bulletin by IAU's Working Group for Small Bodies Nomenclature (WGSBN). Before May 2021, citations were published in MPC's Minor Planet Circulars for many decades. Recent citations can also be found on the JPL Small-Body Database (SBDB). Until his death in 2016, German astronomer Lutz D. Schmadel compiled these citations into the Dictionary of Minor Planet Names (DMP) and regularly updated the collection.

Based on Paul Herget's The Names of the Minor Planets, Schmadel also researched the unclear origin of numerous asteroids, most of which had been named prior to World War II. This article incorporates text from this source, which is in the public domain: SBDB New namings may only be added to this list below after official publication as the preannouncement of names is condemned. The WGSBN publishes a comprehensive guideline for the naming rules of non-cometary small Solar System bodies.

== 14001–14100 ==
Named minor planet	Provisional	This minor planet was named for...	Ref; Catalog
14002 Johngoodhue	1993 LW_{1}	John Goodhue (born 1951), executive director of the Massachusetts Green High Performance Computing Center.	JPL · 14002
14003 Waynegilmore	1993 OO_{4}	Wayne Gilmore (born 1972), executive director of Boston University's Research Computing Services group.	JPL · 14003
14004 Chikama	1993 SK_{2}	Taketo Chikama (born 1961) is a founding member of the Fukuoka Astronomical Society. His greatest pleasure as an amateur astronomer is taking photographs of many kinds of heavenly bodies. His greatest interest is his search for supernovae	JPL · 14004
14005 Ferrínmoreiras	1993 SO_{3}	Antonia Ferrín Moreiras, the first woman to earn an astronomy Ph.D. in Spain, under the supervision of Ramón María Aller in 1963.	IAU · 14005
14006 Sakamotofumio	1993 SA_{4}	Fumio Sakamoto (born 1968) once worked as a planetarium volunteer and during observation meetings of the municipal science museum in Kitakyushu. He currently remains engaged in the spread of astronomy activities for children and local citizens. He is a member of the Fukuoka Astronomical Society	JPL · 14006
14007 Fiamingo	1993 TH_{14}	Giuseppe Fiamingo (born 1972), Italian mathematician, physics teacher, and science communicator.	JPL · 14007
14008 Toniscarmato	1993 TD_{17}	Antonio "Toni" Scarmato (born 1963), Italian astrophysicist, science communicator, and mathematics and physics teacher.	JPL · 14008
14010 Jomonaomori	1993 UL	Jōmon is the Japanese Neolithic culture (14,000–300 BC) known for its sophisticated culture and pottery. Jomon remains, such as the Sannai-Maruyama site, are found largely in Aomori Prefecture	JPL · 14010
14012 Amedee	1993 XG	Amedee, a small uninhabited island 30 km west of Noumea, New Caledonia.	JPL · 14012
14014 Münchhausen	1994 AL_{16}	Baron Munchausen (1720–1797), German officer and adventurer	MPC · 14014
14015 Senancour	1994 BD_{4}	Etienne Pivert de Senancour (1770–1846), a French essayist and philosopher	JPL · 14015
14016 Steller	1994 BJ_{4}	Georg Wilhelm Steller (1709–1746), German botanist, who accompanied Vitus Bering on the expedition that led to the discovery of southeastern Alaska	JPL · 14016
14019 Pourbus	1994 PP_{16}	Pieter Pourbus (1523–1584) was a Dutch-Flemish Renaissance painter, sculptor and cartographer. Known primarily for his religious and portrait painting, he was also a surveyor and engineer. Name suggested by C. Leterme.	JPL · 14019
14024 Procol Harum	1994 RZ	Procol Harum British progressive rock band Img	MPC · 14024
14025 Fallada	1994 RR_{11}	Hans Fallada (1893–1947), German writer	MPC · 14025
14026 Esquerdo	1994 ST_{7}	Gilbert A. Esquerdo (born 1976), American research assistant for the Near-Earth-Asteroid Physical Study project at the University of Western Ontario †	MPC · 14026
14027 Ichimoto	1994 TJ_{1}	Kiyoshi Ichimoto (b. 1957), a professor at Kyoto University.	IAU · 14027
14028 Nakamurahiroshi	1994 TZ_{14}	Hiroshi Nakamura (born 1955) is a well-known amateur astronomer in Kagawa Prefecture, Japan.	JPL · 14028
14031 Rozyo	1994 WF_{2}	Rozyo Elementary School, the name of a historical school in Ishikawa Prefecture, Japan.	JPL · 14031
14032 Mego	1994 XP	Japanese Princess Megohime (1568–1653), also known as Lady Tamura, the wife of Date Masamune; a cherry tree seedling planted near the Sendai Astronomical Observatory is known as the "Princess Mego Cherry Tree".	JPL · 14032
14036 Yasuhirotoyama	1995 EY_{7}	Yasuhiro Toyama (born 1953) is a Japanese electronic engineer. He has developed a number of inexpensive high-performance motor drive control circuits for astronomical telescopes, including the one used for the telescope that discovered this object.	JPL · 14036
14037 Takakikasahara	1995 EZ_{7}	Takaki Kasahara (born 1963) is a Japanese engineer. He is in charge of maintaining the astronomical telescope system for public observatories, such as the 0.91-m reflector telescope at Mt. Dodaira, and is developing laser autofocus system for microscopes. He is sometimes asked by camera companies to write articles about astrophotography.	IAU · 14037
14040 Andrejka	1995 QD_{2}	Andrea Galádová (born 1970), familiarly known as Andrejka, wife of the first discoverer. Adrián Galád. It was the first discovered minor planet at Modra Observatory.	JPL · 14040
14041 Dürrenmatt	1995 SO_{54}	Friedrich Dürrenmatt (1921–1990), Swiss author	MPC · 14041
14042 Agafonov	1995 UG_{5}	Konstantin Vasil'evich Agafonov (1935–1997), a well-known organizer of the electronic industry in Russia	JPL · 14042
14046 Keikai	1995 WE_{5}	Keikai mountain (height 294 meters) is located in the north of Nanyo-city, Yamagata prefecture. The Nanyo Citizen Observatory is located there	JPL · 14046
14047 Kohichiro	1995 WG_{5}	Kohichiro Morita (1954–2012), a professor at the National Astronomical Observatory of Japan.	JPL · 14047
14054 Dušek	1996 AR	Jiří Dušek (born 1971), Czech astronomer the Nicolas Copernicus Observatory and Planetarium in Brno. He is a co-founder of the Czech Internet astronomical newspaper IAN.	MPC · 14054
14056 Kainar	1996 AO_{1}	Josef Kainar (1917–1971), Czech poet, dramatist, journalist and musician	MPC · 14056
14057 Manfredstoll	1996 AV_{1}	Manfred Stoll (born 1938), Austrian astronomical computer specialist from Vienna	MPC · 14057
14060 Patersonewen	1996 BM_{5}	Paterson Ewen (1925–2002), Canadian astronomical artist and teacher	MPC · 14060
14061 Nagincox	1996 CT_{7}	Nagin Cox (born 1965) is a system engineer and a manager on multiple interplanetary robotic NASA missions.	JPL · 14061
14062 Cremaschini	1996 CR_{8}	Claudio Cremaschini (born 1984), an amateur astronomer in Brescia, Italy	JPL · 14062
14065 Flegel	1996 EY_{5}	Mike Flegel (born 1955), amateur astronomer and member of the Royal Astronomical Society of Canada †	MPC · 14065
14068 Hauserová	1996 HP_{1}	Eva Hauserová (1954–2023), Czech writer and journalist	MPC · 14068
14069 Krasheninnikov	1996 HP_{18}	Stepan Krasheninnikov (1711–1755), Russian geographer and anthropologist	JPL · 14069
14071 Gadabird	1996 JK_{13}	Bonnie Bird (born 1947) and Andreas Gada (born 1952), Canadian amateur astronomers †	MPC · 14071
14072 Volterra	1996 KN	Vito Volterra (1860–1940), Italian mathematician and physicist	MPC · 14072
14074 Riccati	1996 NS	The family of Italian mathematicians of Jacopo Francesco Riccati (1676–1754) and his sons Vincenzo (1707–1775), Giordano (1709–1790) and Francesco (1718–1791) wrote principally on differential equations, geometry and the work of Newton. Riccati's differential equation is famous.	JPL · 14074
14075 Kenwill	1996 OJ	Kenneth A. Williams (born 1956), of Lake Clear, New York, an American astrometrist, astrophotographer, and discoverer of minor planets	JPL · 14075
14077 Volfango	1996 PF_{1}	Wolfango Montanari (born 1931), Italian athlete at the Olympic Games in Helsinki in 1952	JPL · 14077
14080 Heppenheim	1997 GB	The medieval town of Heppenheim, Germany. On a hill above the city the ruins of the Starkenburg castle dominate the picturesque scenery.	JPL · 14080
14088 Ancus	1997 JB_{10}	Ancus Marcius (c. 677–617 BC), fourth king of Rome, reigned from 640 to 616 B.C.	JPL · 14088
14092 Gaily	1997 MC_{8}	T. Dean Gaily (born 1934), Canadian physicist and professor in the physics department at the University of Western Ontario	MPC · 14092
14094 Garneau	1997 OJ_{1}	Marc Garneau (born 1949), the first Canadian in space	MPC · 14094
14097 Capdepera	1997 PU_{4}	Capdepera, a village in eastern Mallorca, Spain	JPL · 14097
14098 Šimek	1997 QS	Miloš Šimek (born 1933), Czech radio astronomer at Ondřejov Observatory	JPL · 14098
14100 Weierstrass	1997 RQ_{5}	Karl Weierstrass (1815–1897), German mathematician	MPC · 14100

== 14101–14200 ==
back to top

Named minor planet	Provisional	This minor planet was named for...	Ref; Catalog
14103 Manzoni	1997 TC	Alessandro Manzoni (1785–1873), an Italian poet and novelist.	JPL · 14103
14104 Delpino	1997 TV	Federico Ernesto Delpino (1946–2007), an astronomer at the Bologna Observatory, began his scientific career by studying x-ray and \gamma -ray sources and the microwave cosmic background. He contributed to the creation of the electronic network at the University of Bologna and participated in astronomical popularization.	JPL · 14104
14105 Nakadai	1997 TS_{17}	Tatsuya Nakadai (born 1932), a prominent Japanese actor who has received awards from the Cannes, Venice, and Berlin film festivals	JPL · 14105
14111 Kimamos	1998 QA_{24}	Kim Amos, 2002 DCYSC mentor. She teaches at the Mt. De Chantal Visitation Academy, Wheeling, West Virginia.	JPL · 14111
14114 Randyray	1998 QE_{35}	Randy Ray, 2002 DCYSC mentor. He teaches at the Reyburn Intermediate School, Clovis, California.	JPL · 14114
14115 Melaas	1998 QO_{36}	Kathleen Melaas, 2002 DCYSC mentor. She teaches at the Valley High School, Hoople, North Dakota.	JPL · 14115
14116 Ogea	1998 QC_{40}	Amanda H. Ogea, 2002 DCYSC mentor. She teaches at the Episcopal Day School, Lake Charles, Louisiana.	JPL · 14116
14119 Johnprince	1998 QU_{46}	John E. Prince, 2002 DCYSC mentor. He teaches at the Keystone Junior High School, San Antonio, Texas.	JPL · 14119
14120 Espenak	1998 QJ_{54}	Fred Espenak (1953–2025), American astronomer and compiler of eclipse atlases (ephemerides) †	MPC · 14120
14121 Stüwe	1998 QM_{54}	Joachim A. Stüwe (born 1958), of the Astronomisches Institut, Ruhr-Universität Bochum, has catalogued dark clouds and globules in the southern Milky Way and pioneered the development of distance determination algorithms for interstellar clouds based on automatic star counts.	JPL · 14121
14122 Josties	1998 QA_{55}	F. Jerry Josties (born 1937) worked at the United States Naval Observatory for more than four decades. He managed USNO's photographic double star program and contributed to VLBI work on the determination of polar motion, Earth rotation and nutation.	JPL · 14122
14124 Kamil	1998 QN_{60}	Kamil Hornoch, Czech amateur astronomer †	MPC · 14124
14129 DiBucci	1998 QO_{95}	Janet DiBucci, 2002 DCYSC mentor. She teaches at the Brentwood Middle School, Pittsburgh, Pennsylvania.	JPL · 14129
14134 Penkala	1998 RP_{42}	Brad Penkala, 2002 DCYSC mentor. He teaches at the Goleta Valley Junior High School, Goleta, California.	JPL · 14134
14135 Cynthialang	1998 RZ_{62}	Cynthia Lang, 2002 DCYSC mentor. She teaches at the Independence Home School, Yardley, Pennsylvania.	JPL · 14135
14141 Demeautis	1998 SR_{1}	Christophe Demeautis, an amateur astronomer.	JPL · 14141
14143 Hadfield	1998 SQ_{18}	Chris Hadfield (born 1959) was selected as a Canadian astronaut in 1992, flew on space shuttle missions STS-74 and STS-100.	JPL · 14143
14145 Sciam	1998 SE_{24}	Scientific American, founded in 1845, is the oldest continuously published magazine in North America.	JPL · 14145
14146 Hughmaclean	1998 SP_{42}	Hugh Noel Alexander Maclean (1915–2003) was an amateur astronomer in St. Catharines, Ontario, who helped found the Royal Astronomical Society of Canada, Niagara Centre, in 1960, and was president of the Niagara Centre during 1966–1968 and 1978–1979. He was employed as a shipping foreman.	JPL · 14146
14147 Wenlingshuguang	1998 SG_{43}	Wenlingshuguang is the event of the first sunlight (Shuguang in Chinese) of the new millennium shining on Wenling, Zhejiang, the first geographical point on China's mainland.	JPL · 14147
14148 Jimchamberlin	1998 SO_{45}	Jim Chamberlin (1915–1981) a Canadian aerodynamicist who worked on Avro Aircraft's Jetliner and Arrow projects, then moved to NASA and was involved with the Mercury, Gemini and Apollo space programs.	JPL · 14148
14149 Yakowitz	1998 SF_{61}	Sidney Yakowitz (1937–1999), a professor in the systems and industrial engineering department of the University of Arizona from 1966 to 1999.	JPL · 14149
14153 Dianecaplain	1998 SA_{80}	Diane S. Caplain, 2002 DCYSC mentor. She teaches at the Great Neck South Middle School, Great Neck, New York.	JPL · 14153
14154 Negrelli	1998 SZ_{106}	David Negrelli, 2002 DCYSC mentor. He teaches at the Paul W. Bell Middle School, Miami, Florida.	JPL · 14154
14155 Cibronen	1998 SK_{122}	Cindy Bronen, 2002 DCYSC mentor. She teaches at the Andrew W. Mellon Middle School, Pittsburgh, Pennsylvania.	JPL · 14155
14157 Pamelasobey	1998 SA_{133}	Pamela Sobey, 2002 DCYSC mentor. She teaches at the Keystone Junior High School, San Antonio, Texas.	JPL · 14157
14158 Alananderson	1998 SZ_{133}	Alan Anderson, 2002 DCYSC mentor. He teaches at the C.W. Ruckel Middle School, Niceville, Florida.	JPL · 14158
14163 Johnchapman	1998 TY_{20}	John Herbert Chapman, "Father of the Canadian Space Program" †	MPC · 14163
14164 Hennigar	1998 TH_{29}	Donald M. Hennigar (1887–1951) was a Canadian amateur telescope maker and active member of the Royal Astronomical Society of Canada, London Centre. He served as vice president of the London Centre during 1936–1938. He was staff architect with the London Life Insurance Company.	JPL · 14164
14172 Amanolivere	1998 VN_{8}	Amanda Olivere, 2002 DCYSC mentor. She teaches at the Engle Middle School, West Grove, Pennsylvania.	JPL · 14172
14174 Deborahsmall	1998 VO_{13}	Deborah Small, 2002 DCYSC mentor. She teaches at the George Washington Carver Middle School, Miami, Florida.	JPL · 14174
14179 Skinner	1998 VM_{32}	Christopher J. Skinner (1963–1997), teacher of British astronomer Ian P. Griffin, the discoverer of this minor planet.	JPL · 14179
14181 Koromházi	1998 WX_{6}	Beáta Koromházi is the mother of Hungarian astronomer Krisztián Sárneczky, a co-discoverer of this minor planet.	MPC · 14181
14182 Alley	1998 WG_{12}	Karen Alley, 2002 DCYSC mentor. She teaches at the East Middle School, Butte, Montana.	JPL · 14182
14185 Van Ness	1998 WK_{32}	Michael E. Van Ness (born 1974), an American astronomer and observer for LONEOS since 1998. He is interested in archaeoastronomy and has discovered comet 213P/Van Ness.	JPL · 14185
14186 Virgiliofos	1998 XP_{2}	Virgilio Fossombroni (born 1946), a teacher of Italian Literature, developed a keen interest in science in general and taught the first rudiments of astronomy to the first discoverer when he was a little boy.	JPL · 14186
14189 Sèvre	1998 XB_{14}	François Sèvre (born 1948) a French astronomer who started his career as an infrared astronomy engineer at Meudon Observatory. He has participated in a large number of observing runs, most notably at the Pic du Midi Observatory, where his knowledge of the mountain and his human qualities have always been appreciated.	JPL · 14189
14190 Soldán	1998 XS_{15}	Jan Soldán (born 1957) is a Czech astronomer, designer and developer of control software and programs for space and ground-based experiments, including CCD cameras, robotic telescopes and real-time image processing. Since 1996 he has taken part in the INTEGRAL satellite project.	JPL · 14190

== 14201–14300 ==
back to top

Named minor planet	Provisional	This minor planet was named for...	Ref; Catalog
14203 Hocking	1998 YT_{20}	Wayne Keith Hocking (born 1955), a Canadian physicist who has studied atmospheric and radar physics and constructed radar systems. He joined the faculty at the University of Western Ontario in 1991.	JPL · 14203
14206 Sehnal	1999 CL_{10}	Ladislav Sehnal (born 1931), a Czech astronomer who is known for his work on the effects of solar radiation and atmospheric drag on the motions of artificial satellites and the theory of space accelerometric measurements. He served as director of the Astronomical Institute of the Czech Academy of Sciences during 1990–1996.	JPL · 14206
14214 Hirsch	1999 RP_{86}	Theresa Hirsch, 2002 DYSC mentor. She teaches at the St. John the Baptist School, New Brighton, Minnesota	JPL · 14214
14217 Oaxaca	1999 VV_{19}	Oaxaca, City and State in Mexico, birthplace of Benito Juárez, first native-born president of Mexico, first numbered asteroid discovered from Mexico (updated by the discoverer)	MPC · 14217
14220 Alexgibbs	1999 VE_{115}	Alex Gibbs (born 1967), an observer and software engineer with the Catalina Sky Survey.	JPL · 14220
14223 Dolby	1999 XW_{1}	John Dolby (born 1961) was a telescope operator at the University of New Mexico's Capilla Peak Observatory during 1988–1989. Since 1995 he has provided consultation and technical assistance to the astronomical and biomedical communities about CCD imaging systems	JPL · 14223
14224 Gaede	1999 XU_{33}	Allison Gaede, 2001 DYSC mentor. Gaede is a teacher at the Reyburn Intermediate School, Clovis, California	JPL · 14224
14225 Alisahamilton	1999 XZ_{49}	Alisa Hamilton, 2001 DYSC mentor. Hamilton is a teacher at the College Station Middle School, College Station, Texas	JPL · 14225
14226 Hamura	1999 XR_{50}	Jay Hamura, 2001 DYSC mentor. Hamura is a teacher at the St. Andrew's Priory, Honolulu, Hawaii	JPL · 14226
14230 Mariahines	1999 XF_{100}	Maria L. Hines, 2001 DYSC mentor. Hines is a teacher at the Orchard Day Home School, Ft. Wayne, Indiana.	JPL · 14230
14232 Curtismiller	1999 XJ_{120}	Curtis Miller (born 1988) is a Guidance, Navigation and Control engineer for Lockheed Martin working on Natural Feature Tracking for the OSIRIS-REx Asteroid Sample Return Mission. Prior to this role, he worked as a GN&C operations engineer.	JPL · 14232
14234 Davidhoover	1999 XZ_{182}	David L. Hoover, 2001 DYSC mentor. Hoover is a teacher at the Middletown Middle School, Middletown, Maryland	JPL · 14234
14238 d'Artagnan	1999 YX_{13}	d'Artagnan, one of the Three Musketeers	MPC · 14238
14244 Labnow	2000 AT_{29}	Science teacher (MCMS) /scientist	MPC · 14244
14250 Kathleenmartin	2000 AJ_{63}	Kathleen B. Martin, 2001 DYSC mentor. Martin is a teacher at the Doolen Middle School, Tucson, Arizona	JPL · 14250
14252 Audreymeyer	2000 AD_{64}	Audrey W. Meyer, 2001 DYSC mentor. Meyer is a teacher at the Falmouth Academy, Falmouth, Massachusetts	JPL · 14252
14258 Katrinaminck	2000 AM_{116}	Katrina D. Minck, 2001 DYSC mentor. Minck is a teacher at the Manhattan Beach Middle School, Manhattan Beach, California	JPL · 14258
14262 Kratzer	2000 AC_{125}	Sherri Kratzer, 2002 DYSC mentor. She teaches at the Great Valley Middle School, Malvern, Pennsylvania	JPL · 14262
14267 Zook	2000 AJ_{153}	Herbert A. ("Herb") Zook (1932–2001) was a planetary scientist who advanced the understanding of the interplanetary dust complex by his studies at the NASA Johnson Space Center of meteoroid orbital evolution, collisions, resonant orbit interactions, radiation pressure and electromagnetic effects	JPL · 14267
14268 Azeus	2000 AK_{156}	Azeus, Minyan prince in Greek mythology. In Homer’s Iliad, he is named in the ancestry of Ascalaphus and Ialmenus, leaders of the Minyan contingent in the Greek expedition against Troy.	IAU · 14268
14274 Landstreet	2000 BL_{21}	John Darlington Landstreet (born 1940), a Canadian astronomer at the University of Western Ontario. He helped discover magnetic fields in white dwarf stars and developed Balmer-line polarimetry for detection of magnetic fields in middle-main sequence stars.	JPL · 14274
14275 Dianemurray	2000 BR_{26}	Diane K. Murray, 2001 DYSC mentor. Murray is a teacher at the J. F. Kennedy Elementary School, Butte, Montana.	JPL · 14275
14277 Parsa	2000 CS_{13}	Steve Parsa, 2001 DYSC mentor. Parsa is a teacher at the Palos Verdes Intermediate School, Palos Verdes, California	JPL · 14277
14278 Perrenot	2000 CV_{29}	Valerie T. Perrenot, 2001 DYSC mentor. Perrenot is a teacher at the Barbara Bush Middle School, San Antonio, Texas	JPL · 14278
14282 Cruijff	2097 P-L	Johan Cruijff (1947–2016) was a legendary Dutch football player who also became successful as a football coach in the Netherlands and Spain. His Cruyff Foundation supports sports projects for disabled and disadvantaged children. The name was suggested by Carl Koppeschaar	JPL · 14282
14291 Savereide	1104 T-1	Barbara Savereide (born 1964), sister of D. W. E. Green, who identified it.	JPL · 14291

== 14301–14400 ==
back to top

Named minor planet	Provisional	This minor planet was named for...	Ref; Catalog
14308 Hardeman	5193 T-3	Sjoerd Hardeman (1982–2011) was a member of the Jongeren WerkGroep voor sterrenkunde (Dutch Youth Association for astronomy). He was a leader on several astronomy holiday camps and gave many presentations on astronomy. He died from leukemia shortly before defending his PhD.	JPL · 14308
14309 Defoy	A908 SA	Ilse Defoy (1892–1947), wife of Christoph Schubart and mother of Heidelberg astronomer Joachim Schubart	JPL · 14309
14310 Shuttleworth	1966 PP	Mark Shuttleworth, South African businessman, first citizen of an African country to venture into space (on a Soyuz mission in 2002)	JPL · 14310
14312 Polytech	1976 UN_{2}	Saint Petersburg State Technical University (former Polytechnical Institute), founded in 1899, is one of the largest universities laying the foundation of higher polytechnic education in Russia.	JPL · 14312
14313 Dodaira	1976 UZ_{7}	Dodaira station was dedicated in 1962 with a 0.91-m reflector and 0.50-m Schmidt telescope as a branch station of the Tokyo Astronomical Observatory in Saitama prefecture, and its operation was terminated in Mar. 2000. It was located where the borders of Tokigawa, Ogawamachi and Higashichichibu meet.	MPC · 14313
14314 Tokigawa	1977 DQ_{3}	Tokigawa, a village east of the Chichibu mountain range in Saitama prefecture, north of Tokyo, near where Dodaira station was located.	JPL · 14314
14315 Ogawamachi	1977 EL_{5}	Ogawamachi, a town at the eastern edge of Chichibu mountain range in Saitama prefecture.	JPL · 14315
14316 Higashichichibu	1977 ES_{7}	Higashichichibu, a village of 4000 at the eastern edge of the Chichibu mountain range in Saitama prefecture.	JPL · 14316
14317 Antonov	1978 PC_{3}	Oleg Konstantinovich Antonov (1906–1984) worked in Kiev beginning in 1952 and was the founder of a national scientific and technical school of aircraft building. He made many types of gliders, passenger and transport aircraft distinguished by the latest features and discoveries. He was also a talented poet and artist.	JPL · 14317
14318 Buzinov	1978 SD_{3}	Victor Mikhajlovich Buzinov (1934–2006) was a Russian journalist and author from St. Petersburg. About three thousand of his Radio walks through the city won the recognition of citizens and promoted their civic consciousness. He wrote several books on the history of St. Petersburg that were awarded prestigious prizes.	JPL · 14318
14322 Shakura	1978 YM	Nikolai Ivanovich Shakura, Russian astrophysicist	JPL · 14322
14327 Lemke	1980 FE_{2}	Dietrich Lemke (born 1939), a German astronomer who is the principal investigator of the ISOPHOT instrument on board ESA's Infrared Space Observatory, has encouraged the study of minor planets in the thermal infrared, resulting in their being established as a new class of far-infrared/submillimeter calibrators.	JPL · 14327
14328 Granvik	1980 VH	Mikael Granvik (born 1977), a researcher at the University of Helsinki and senior research scientist, Finnish Geodetic Institute.	JPL · 14328
14329 Michellethompson	1981 EY_{10}	Michelle Thompson, Canadian planetary scientist at Purdue University.	IAU · 14329
14330 Tomlehrer	1981 EG_{21}	Thomas Andrew Lehrer, American musician, singer-songwriter, satirist, and mathematician who taught for 29 years at the University of California, Santa Cruz. Generations of scientists have been inspired by his musical works, including Lobachevsky, Wernher von Braun, and especially The Elements.	IAU · 14330
14331 Alyankovic	1981 EC_{26}	"Weird Al" Yankovic (b. 1959), an American parody musician.	IAU · 14331
14332 Brucebarnett	1981 EX_{26}	Bruce Barnett (b. 1956), an American Certified Public Accountant who was the first Chief Financial Officer of the Planetary Science Institute.	IAU · 14332
14333 Alanfischer	1981 ED_{34}	Alan Fischer (b. 1957), an American journalist and the first Public Information Officer of the Planetary Science Institute.	IAU · 14333
14334 Lindarueger	1981 EE_{38}	Linda Rueger (b. 1954), the first Human Resources Director of the Planetary Science Institute.	IAU · 14334
14335 Alexosipov	1981 RR_{3}	Alexandr Kuzmich Osipov (1920–2004) was a Ukrainian astronomer at the Astronomical Observatory of Kyiv National University. He was a talented teacher of many generations of students. His interests were wide-ranging, from observations of artificial satellites to studies of the motion and the figure of the moon, planets and comets.	JPL · 14335
14338 Shibakoukan	1982 VP_{3}	Shiba Koukan (1747–1818) was a western-style painter in the late Edo period	JPL · 14338
14339 Knorre	1983 GU	Ernest Khristov Knorre (1759–1810) was the first astronomer at Tartu University. His son Karl Khristov Knorre (1801–1883) was the first director of the naval Nikolaev Observatory. Victor Karlovich Knorre (1840–1919) worked in Nikolaev, Pulkovo and Berlin and discovered (158) Koronis and three other minor planets	JPL · 14339
14342 Iglika	1984 SL	Iglika Mancheva, whose father Hristo Manchev was a friend of the discoverers.	JPL · 14342
14345 Gritsevich	1985 PO	Maria Gritsevich (born 1977), a research scientist at the Finnish Geodetic Institute.	JPL · 14345
14346 Zhilyaev	1985 QG_{5}	Boris Efimovich Zhilyaev (born 1940) is a Ukrainian astronomer and chief of the high-speed photometry group at the main astronomical observatory of the National Academy of Sciences of Ukraine. He has organized an international network of synchronized HSPh telescopes to detect microsecond stellar variations at a level down to 0.001 magnitude.	JPL · 14346
14348 Cumming	1985 UO_{3}	Robert Cumming (born 1967), an astronomer at Onsala Space Observatory.	JPL · 14348
14349 Nikitamikhalkov	1985 UQ_{4}	Nikita Sergeyevich Mikhalkov (born 1945), Russian film director and has also acted in more than 40 films. He received awards from Cannes and Venice, and won an Oscar for the Best Foreign Film, Burnt by the Sun (1994). Since December 1997, he has been chairman of the Cinematographers' Union of Russia.	JPL · 14349
14351 Tomaskohout	1986 RF_{3}	Tomas Kohout (born 1980), a postdoctoral researcher at the University of Helsinki.	JPL · 14351
14354 Kolesnikov	1987 QX_{7}	Evgeny Kolesnikov, Russian scientist who has conducted research at the Tunguska impact site	JPL · 14354
14360 Ipatov	1988 CV_{4}	Sergej Ivanovich Ipatov (born 1952) is a Russian scientist and specialist in the migration of minor planets. During his stay in 1999 at the Uccle Observatory, he was shown to be a very fine observer who made several discoveries with the Uccle Schmidt telescope.	JPL · 14360
14361 Boscovich	1988 DE	Ruggiero Giuseppe Boscovich (1711–1787), Jesuit professor of mathematics and philosophy at Rome and Pavia. JPL	MPC · 14361
14365 Jeanpaul	1988 RZ_{2}	Jean Paul (Friedrich Richter, 1763–1825), a German writer and poet.	JPL · 14365
14366 Wilhelmraabe	1988 RX_{3}	Wilhelm Raabe (Jacob Corvinus, 1831–1910), The Lower-Saxon novelist and poet.	JPL · 14366
14367 Hippokrates	1988 RY_{3}	Hippokrates (460?-375 B.C.), a Greek physician.	JPL · 14367
14372 Paulgerhardt	1989 AD_{6}	Paul Gerhardt (1607–1676), a German poet and theologian.	JPL · 14372
14380 Bussey	1989 UC_{6}	D. Benjamin J. “Ben” Bussey, British planetary scientist whose career has focused on lunar exploration.	IAU · 14380
14382 Woszczyk	1990 ES_{6}	Andrzej Woszczyk (1935–2011), was a Polish astronomer, professor of astrophysics and chair of astronomy and astrophysics of the Toruń Center for Astronomy at the Nicolaus Copernicus University.	JPL · 14382
14395 Tommorgan	1990 TN_{3}	Thomas H. Morgan, a U.S. planetary scientist.	JPL · 14395
14400 Baudot	1990 WO_{4}	Jean-Maurice-Emile Baudot (1845–1903) invented a telegraphic code in 1874 that encoded each letter of the alphabet as a series of "on-or-off" signals. Because each signal has the same duration, this system is more efficient than Morse code, and it still used in telecommunications today.	JPL · 14400

== 14401–14500 ==
back to top

Named minor planet	Provisional	This minor planet was named for...	Ref; Catalog
14401 Reikoyukawa	1990 XV	Reiko Yukawa (born 1936) is a Japanese music critic, songwriter and translator. She is known for her work as a jazz critic for "Swing Journal" and as a radio disc jockey.	JPL · 14401
14403 de Machault	1991 GM_{8}	Guillaume de Machault (c. 1300–1377), a medieval poet and one of the last poet-musicians.	JPL · 14403
14411 Clérambault	1991 RE_{2}	Louis-Nicolas Clérambault (1676–1749), a composer of music for organ and harpsichord, was organist at several places in Paris. The uncontested master of the French cantata, he is particularly well known for his sonatas for violin and basso continuo	JPL · 14411
14412 Wolflojewski	1991 RU_{2}	Wolf von Lojewski, a prominent journalist, book author and long-standing correspondent of the German TV system ZDF in Europe and abroad.	JPL · 14412
14413 Geiger	1991 RT_{3}	Hans Geiger, German physicist.	JPL · 14413
14420 Massey	1991 SM	Steven (Steve) Massey (born 1962), a pioneer in the use of modern video cameras in astronomical imaging.	JPL · 14420
14424 Laval	1991 SR_{3}	Université Laval, Québec, Canada, oldest university of North America † ‡	MPC · 14424
14425 Fujimimachi	1991 TJ_{2}	Fujimimachi is a health resort town in central Japan known for its beautiful scenery and clean air. Mt. Nyukasa station, where this minor planet was discovered, is located in this town.	JPL · 14425
14426 Katotsuyoshi	1991 UO_{2}	Tsuyoshi Kato (born 1968) is one of the leading amateur astronomers in Saitama prefecture.	JPL · 14426
14428 Lazaridis	1991 VM_{12}	Mike Lazaridis, Canadian entrepreneur and founder of the Perimeter Institute †	MPC · 14428
14429 Coyne	1991 XC	George Coyne (born 1933), S.J., an astronomer at the Vatican Observatory since 1969.	JPL · 14429
14436 Morishita	1992 FC_{2}	After Yoko Morishita (born 1947) retired from the medical field in 2007, she decided to nurture her interest in astronomy. She is an enthusiastic supporter of activities at the Astronomical Society of Shikoku, making many contributions there to furthering the spread of astronomical awareness.	JPL · 14436
14438 MacLean	1992 HC_{2}	Steven Glenwood MacLean (born 1954), selected as a Canadian astronaut in 1983, is an expert in laser physics and space vision systems. He flew on space shuttle mission STS-52.	JPL · 14438
14439 Evermeersch	1992 RE_{2}	Etienne Vermeersch (born 1934), a Belgian philosopher and professor.	JPL · 14439
14441 Atakanoseki	1992 SJ	Atakanoseki, a checkpoint set up in Komatsu-city, Ishikawa Prefecture, in 1187. In the 400-year-old Kabuki play "Kanjincho"', two historical figures (Minamotono Yoshitsune, a great warrior, and Benkei, a brave monk) went through Atakanoseki in disguise to the northeastern part of Japan.	JPL · 14441
14443 Sekinenomatsu	1992 TV	Recognized as a special natural treasure that is estimated to be over 370 years old, the six-meter-high pine tree of Sekine is located in the San-nohe town, Aomori Prefecture.	JPL · 14443
14445 Koichi	1992 UZ_{3}	Koichi Nishimura (born 1943) is the chairman of the telescope manufacturing company that bears his name. Nishimura began manufacturing reflecting telescopes in 1926. Since then, their telescopes have been installed in science museums and astronomical observatories throughout Japan.	JPL · 14445
14446 Kinkowan	1992 UP_{6}	Kinkowan (Kagoshima Bay) in Kagoshima Prefecture, Japan. Mount Sakurajima, a famous active volcano, is in the centre of Kinkowan †	MPC · 14446
14447 Hosakakanai	1992 VL	Kanai Hosaka (1896–1937) was a Japanese astronomer. In 1910, he showed his drawing of 1P/Halley to Kenji Miyazawa (1896–1933) with the words, "The comet was like a night train going along the Milky Way". This probably inspired Kenji's best-known story "Night on the Galactic Railroad.".	JPL · 14447
14449 Myogizinzya	1992 WE_{1}	Myogizinzya is a historic Shinto shrine built in 537 on the main peak of Myogi Mountain in Gunma prefecture, located in the center of the Japanese archipelago.	JPL · 14449
14463 McCarter	1993 GA_{1}	David Graham McCarter (born 1946), a Canadian amateur astronomer in London, Ontario, is an indefatigable observer and a respected telescope maker who served as president of the Royal Astronomical Society of Canada, London Centre, beginning in 2000.	JPL · 14463
14466 Hodge	1993 OY_{2}	Paul W. Hodge (1934–2019), was a professor of astronomy at the University of Washington and, from 1984 to 2004, was editor of the Astronomical Journal.	JPL · 14466
14467 Vranckx	1993 OP_{3}	Rudy Vranckx (born 1959), a historian, has been a conflict journalist in the news department of the Flemish public service broadcaster VRT for more than 25 years. In a career, which included time spent in the Centre for Peace Studies at KU Leuven, he has reported on many conflicts all over the world.	JPL · 14467
14468 Ottostern	1993 OS_{12}	Otto Stern (1888–1969), a German Jewish experimental physicist.	JPL · 14468
14469 Komatsuataka	1993 RK	Komatsuataka is a seaside town in Komatsu City, Ishikawa Prefecture.	JPL · 14469
14479 Plekhanov	1994 CQ_{13}	Gennadij Plekhanov (born 1926) is a Russian scientist from Tomsk University who has conducted scientific investigations for 30 years at the Tunguska impact site near Vanavara. In July 1995 the discoverer accompanied him on an excursion to the Tunguska explosion area.	JPL · 14479
14486 Tuscia	1994 TE	The ancient name of Tuscany. The central Italian region once inhabited by the Etruscans, and located between the Tyrrhenian Sea and the Arno and Tiber rivers.	JPL · 14486
14487 Sakaisakae	1994 TU_{2}	Sakae Sakai (born 1953) is a well-known amateur astronomer.	JPL · 14487
14491 Hitachiomiya	1994 VY_{2}	Hitachiomiya city, located in the northeast of Kanto district in central Japan, came on the scene in Oct. 2004 through the merger of five towns and villages. The former Miwa village area of Hitachi Omiya city is now the site of the Bistar Astronomical Observatory	JPL · 14491
14492 Bistar	1994 VM_{6}	Bistar is the name of the astronomical observatory at Hanadate Nature Park in Hitachiomiya city, Ibaraki prefecture. Volunteers conduct stargazing parties at the observatory. In addition, the Mt. Hanadate Star Festival has been held there each summer since 1991	JPL · 14492
14495 Kazuakiwatanabe	1995 AK_{1}	Kazuaki Watanabe (b. 1958) runs Showa Kikai, a Japanese manufacturer of astronomical telescopes. Many of its telescopes are widely used in public observatories, research institutions and schools. Kazuaki is also involved in the development team for the compact echelle spectrograph for Saitama University's 0.55-meter reflecting telescope.	IAU · 14495
14498 Bernini	1995 DO_{2}	Gian Lorenzo Bernini, an Italian architect and sculptor who designed the colonnade of St. Peter's Basilica in Rome.	JPL · 14498
14499 Satotoshio	1995 VR_{1}	Toshio Sato (born 1936), a Japanese amateur astronomer and expert on the modern history of Japanese astronomy.	JPL · 14499
14500 Kibo	1995 WO_{7}	Kibo, a word meaning "hope" or "wish", became a Japanese nickname for the Experiment Module of the International Space Station.	JPL · 14500

== 14501–14600 ==
back to top

Named minor planet	Provisional	This minor planet was named for...	Ref; Catalog
14501 Tetsuokojima	1995 WA_{8}	Tetsuo Kojima (born 1945) is a Japanese amateur astronomer and an active member of Ota Astronomical Club.	JPL · 14501
14502 Morden	1995 WB_{22}	James C. Morden (1869–1944) was a Canadian historian, educator and author in Stamford Township (now Niagara Falls), Ontario. Morden also had an active local political career as a member of Stamford Township Council, and a public school was named for him in 1952.	JPL · 14502
14504 Tsujimura	1995 YL_{3}	Tamiyuki Tsujimura (1928–1998) was a technical staff member at the observatory of Kyoto University. He devoted himself to the development of the equipment at Ikoma and Ouda Stations	JPL · 14504
14505 Barentine	1996 AW_{4}	John C. Barentine (born 1976) has served as an observing specialist at the Apache Point Observatory 3.5-m telescope and Sloan Digital Sky Survey. Trained in stellar astronomy, he was introduced to planetary work by colleagues Gil Esquerdo and Carol Neese, who suggested this name.	JPL · 14505
14509 Lučenec	1996 ER_{2}	Lučenec is a small historical town in Slovakia. It is the cultural and industrial center of the Novohrad region, where the first discoverer, Adrián Galád, has spent his childhood. Lučenec dates from the thirteenth century and during its history, it has twice been razed by fire in 1622 and 1849.	JPL · 14509
14511 Nickel	1996 EU_{3}	Jack Allen "Triple" Nickel (born 1949) joined the Aircraft Operations Division at NASA's Johnson Space Center in 1997. Flying the Shuttle Trainer Aircraft (STA), Nickel helps teach astronauts to land the space shuttle. He is also a keen amateur astronomer and has made a 0.20-m telescope.	JPL · 14511
14513 Alicelindner	1996 GK_{17}	Alice Lindner (born 1948), German secretary at the Hoher List Observatory near Bonn, Germany. For many years she always has been very helpful in preparing the observations made at Hoher List by Eric Walter Elst who discovered this minor planet. Very reliable in her duties, she is appreciated by all colleagues at Hoher List.	JPL · 14513
14515 Koichisato	1996 HL_{1}	Koichi Sato (born 1960) is a local government employee and amateur astronomer, active in the Nanyo Astronomy Enthusiasts Club since 1984	JPL · 14515
14517 Monitoma	1996 LJ_{1}	Monika Pravcová (born 1976), sister of the discoverer, and Tomáš Kneslík (born 1977) fell in love in the year of the discovery of this minor planet and married in 2000 when it was numbered	JPL · 14517
14519 Ural	1996 TT_{38}	The Ural river, flowing from the Ural mountains into Kazakhstan and the Caspian Sea; it forms part of the traditional boundary between Europe and Asia	JPL · 14519
14526 Xenocrates	1997 JT_{3}	Xenocrates of Chalcedon (396–314 B.C.), Greek philosopher and mathematician, was a student of Plato and teacher of Epicurus. As head of the Academy (339-314 B.C.) he upheld Plato's policy that geometry and music are prerequisites to the study of philosophy. He wrote on the history of geometry and on number theory.	JPL · 14526
14533 Roy	1997 QY	René Roy (born 1938), French amateur astronomer and discoverer of minor planets. He was especially interested in CCD photometry (lightcurves) and astrometry of minor planets and comets.	JPL · 14533
14535 Kazuyukihanda	1997 RF	Kazuyuki Handa (born 1926) is a member of the Sakurae Tenmon Doukoukai who popularizes astronomy in Shimane prefecture. He established "Chiisana Shizenkan" (The Small Nature Museum) at Sakurae, where he spreads his message of learning through nature	JPL · 14535
14537 Týn nad Vltavou	1997 RL_{7}	Týn nad Vltavou, a town on the Vltava River in Bohemia, the Czech Republic	MPC · 14537
14539 Clocke Roeland	1997 RU_{9}	Clocke Roeland, the storm bell that is the symbol of the independent spirit of the Belgian (Flemish) city of Ghent	MPC · 14539
14541 Sacrobosco	1997 SF	Johannes de Sacrobosco (c. 1195– c. 1256) was an English astronomer at the University of Paris, and author of the Latin treatise Tractatus de sphaera mundi (1220–1230). It was the most popular medieval textbook on the elements of astronomy and geocentric cosmology, based heavily on Ptolemy's Almagest, and was used until the 17th century.	IAU · 14541
14542 Karitskaya	1997 SW_{9}	Eugenia Alexeevna Karitskaya (born 1947) is an astronomer at the Sternberg Astronomical Institute in Moscow and a specialist in the study of x-ray variable stars. Among many accomplishments, she contributed to the compilation of the General Catalogue of Variable Stars	JPL · 14542
14543 Sajigawasuiseki	1997 SF_{11}	Sajigawa-suiseki is a type of special rock found in the Saji River, which runs through Saji Village. Sajigawa-suiseki is popular and well known among Japanese and is favored for use in gardening, as well as in the making of specialty tray servers	JPL · 14543
14544 Ericjones	1997 SG_{21}	Eric M. Jones (born 1944) is an American astrophysicist and space historian. He incorporated the transcripts from the Apollo landings into the landmark web resource "The Apollo Lunar Surface Journal", expanding the transcripts to include annotations by the astronauts, as well as other documentation.	JPL · 14544
14550 Lehký	1997 UU_{7}	Martin Lehký (1972-2020) was a Czech amateur astronomer and visual and CCD observer of comets, variable stars and minor planets. He was also interested in observations of occultations of stars by solar-system bodies, eclipses, meteors and astrophotography	JPL · 14550
14551 Itagaki	1997 UN_{8}	Koichi Itagaki (born 1947), a confectionery manufacturing industry president, is also an amateur astronomer in Yamagata. He is credited with the discovery of supernovae 2001bq and 2001gd	JPL · 14551
14555 Shinohara	1997 VQ	Tomoe Shinohara (born 1979), a Japanese TV entertainer and designer, whose favorite hobby is astronomical observation and astrophotography.	JPL · 14555
14558 Wangganchang	1997 WG_{1}	Ganchang Wang (1907–1998) was one of the founders of the researches on nuclear physics, cosmic-ray and particle physics in China. He became a member of the Chinese Academy of Sciences in 1955	JPL · 14558
14564 Heasley	1998 BX_{13}	James N. Heasley (born 1947), an American astronomer who completed his Ph.D. at Yale University in 1973 and studies stellar pulsations and populations at the Institute for Astronomy in Honolulu.	JPL · 14564
14566 Hōkūleʻa	1998 MY_{7}	Hōkūleʻa is the Hawaiian word for the star Arcturus. It is also the name of a double-hulled sailing canoe used to retrace ancient ocean crossings of the ancestral Hawaiians, who navigated using stellar observations	JPL · 14566
14567 Nicovincenti	1998 MQ_{8}	Nicole Vincenti, 2002 DYSC mentor. She teaches at the Fairmont Elementary, Sanger, California	JPL · 14567
14568 Zanotta	1998 OK	Mauro Vittorio Zanotta (born 1963), Italian amateur astronomer from Milan, co-discoverer of comet C/1991 Y1 (Zanotta–Brewington) and AAVSO member Src, Src	MPC · 14568
14570 Burkam	1998 QS_{37}	Ann Burkam, 2002 DYSC mentor. She teaches at the Buckeye Valley Middle School, Delaware, Ohio	JPL · 14570
14571 Caralexander	1998 QC_{45}	Carolyn Alexander, 2002 DYSC mentor. She teaches at the Applegate Middle School, Applegate, Oregon	JPL · 14571
14572 Armando	1998 QX_{54}	Armando Blanco (born 1950) is head of the department of physics of University of Lecce. Blanco has studied spectral properties of solar system bodies and interstellar and circumstellar dust grains	JPL · 14572
14573 Montebugnoli	1998 QD_{55}	Stelio Montebugnoli (born 1948) is chief engineer in charge of the Medicina Radiotelescope Station. In Dec. 2001, he successfully collaborated in the first intercontinental planetary radar experiment in Italy, in which echoes were received from (33342) 1998 WT 24	JPL · 14573
14574 Payette	1998 QR_{58}	Julie Payette (born 1963), a Canadian astronaut who flew with the space shuttle Discovery on mission STS-96 to the International Space Station. Since 1992 she has been a member of the Canadian Astronaut Corps and has worked for NASA's astronaut office on robotics.	MPC · 14574
14575 Jamesblanc	1998 QC_{92}	James Blanc mentored, 2002 DYSC mentor. He teaches at the Blennerhassett Junior High, Parkersburg, West Virginia	JPL · 14575
14576 Jefholley	1998 QO_{92}	Jeffrey Holley, 2002 DYSC mentor. He teaches at the St. Peter Chanel Interparochial School, Paulina, Louisiana	JPL · 14576
14582 Conlin	1998 RK_{49}	Kimberly Conlin, 2002 DYSC mentor. She teaches at the Rocky Mountain Middle School, Heber, Utah	JPL · 14582
14583 Lester	1998 RN_{61}	Virginia Lester, 2002 DYSC mentor. She teaches at the Austin Academy for Excellence, Garland, Texas	JPL · 14583
14584 Lawson	1998 RH_{63}	Melissa Lawson, 2002 DYSC mentor. She teaches at the Hastings Middle School, Upper Arlington, Ohio	JPL · 14584
14588 Pharrams	1998 RH_{73}	Stacey Pharrams, 2002 Discovery Channel Young Scientist Challenge mentor. She teaches at the Carnegie Mellon University, Pittsburgh, Pennsylvania.	MPC · 14588
14589 Stevenbyrnes	1998 RW_{79}	Steven J. F. Byrnes (born 1984), 2003 Inter STS finalist. He attends the Roxbury Latin School, West Roxbury, Massachusetts.	MPC · 14589
14593 Everett	1998 SA_{26}	Everett Gibson (born 1940), a planetary geochemist at the NASA Johnson Space Center, concentrates on the abundances, distributions and isotopic compositions of the volatile elements in lunar samples and meteorites. He co-led the team that discovered possible relic biogenic activity in the martian meteorite ALH84001	JPL · 14593
14594 Jindrašilhán	1998 SS_{26}	Jindřich Šilhán (1944–2000) a Czech astronomer who was a major contributor to the development of visual observations in Czechia and Slovakia. He observed eclipsing binaries and organized a program to monitor them. His former students are some of the leaders of public observatories.	JPL · 14594
14595 Peaker	1998 SW_{32}	Brian Ronald Peaker (born 1959) is a Canadian competitive rower from London, Ontario, who represented Canada with distinction at numerous international events. Peaker and his crew mates won a silver medal at the 1996 Atlanta Olympics and a gold medal at the 1993 World Championships in the Czech Republic.	JPL · 14595
14596 Bergstralh	1998 SC_{55}	Jay T. Bergstralh (born 1943) is a planetary astronomer whose studies have comprised both spectroscopic observations and modeling of planetary atmospheres. He has served at NASA headquarters, where he contributed significantly to shaping the Discovery planetary exploration program.	MPC · 14596
14597 Waynerichie	1998 SV_{57}	R. Wayne Richie (born 1942) is a NASA engineer who has worked with both human and robotic space exploration. As Discovery program acquisition manager, he helped shape the technical, cost and risk assessment procedures in the selection process for the Discovery planetary exploration program	JPL · 14597
14598 Larrysmith	1998 SU_{60}	Larry W. Smith (born 1952) is a mechanical engineer, firefighter and paramedic who contributed to the fire containment during the 1989 Phillips chemical plant explosion, leading the initial rescue efforts and first recovery team into the structure	JPL · 14598
14600 Gainsbourg	1998 SG_{73}	Serge Gainsbourg (1928–1991) was a songwriter and an iconic figure in French music. His most famous song is Sous le soleil exactement	JPL · 14600

== 14601–14700 ==
back to top

Named minor planet	Provisional	This minor planet was named for...	Ref; Catalog
14605 Hyeyeonchoi	1998 SD_{123}	Hyeyeon Choi (born 1984), 2003 Inter STS finalist. She attends the Half Hollow Hills High School East, Dix Hills, New York.	JPL · 14605
14606 Hifleischer	1998 SK_{125}	Hilary Caren Fleischer (born 1985), 2003 Inter STS finalist. She attends the South Side High School, Rockville Centre, New York.	JPL · 14606
14611 Elsaadawi	1998 SA_{148}	Nawal El Saadawi (1931–2021), a medical doctor, graduated from the University of Cairo, and writer.	JPL · 14611
14612 Irtish	1998 SG_{164}	Irtish river, flowing from the Mongolian Altay Mountains of China into Kazakhstan and Russia before joining the Ob river	JPL · 14612
14613 Sanchez	1998 TP_{2}	Christian Sanchez is editor-in-chief of the French astronomy magazine Pulsar. A very nice and gentle person, he has worked with very little help to produce over 100 issues of a magazine that always contains much useful information for the amateur astronomer	JPL · 14613
14616 Van Gaal	1998 TK_{30}	Hendrik Van Gaal (1916–1998) was a Belgian priest and the founder of Urania, the public observatory of Antwerp. Van Gall strongly felt that religious institutions should not take a defensive attitude against, but rather encourage, science. The name was suggested by E. Goffin and M. Gyssens.	JPL · 14616
14617 Lasvergnas	1998 UA_{4}	Olivier Las Vergnas (born 1954), French Astronomer, creator of the Association astronomique de Paris en Sorbonne in 1970 and currently president of the French Astronomical Association.	MPC · 14617
14619 Plotkin	1998 UF_{9}	Howard Plotkin (born 1941) is a Canadian historian of science who joined the faculty at the University of Western Ontario and focused on astronomy.	JPL · 14619
14621 Tati	1998 UF_{18}	Jacques Tati (1908–1982), French comic genius, film writer, director and actor, is famous for comedy farces such as Jour De Fête (1946), rich with sound effects but virtually free of dialogue. His brilliant characterization of the quirky Mr. Hulot places him alongside the greats Chaplin and Keaton.	JPL · 14621
14622 Arcadiopoveda	1998 UN_{18}	Arcadio Poveda (born 1930) is a Mexican astronomer and a founder of a number of Mexican scientific institutions. He is best known for his pioneering work on determining the masses of elliptical galaxies	JPL · 14622
14623 Kamoun	1998 UE_{24}	Paul G. D. Kamoun (born 1953) has studied the radar detectability of comets. Using the 12.6-cm wavelength radar at Arecibo, he succeeded in detecting, for the first time, the nuclei of 2P/Encke (in 1980) and 26P/Grigg-Skjellerup (in 1982). The name was suggested by P. Michel	JPL · 14623
14624 Prymachenko	1998 UO_{24}	Maria Prymachenko (1909–1998) was a prolific Ukrainian artist who mainly expressed herself in the naïve style of painting. She was also an accomplished embroiderer and potter. The name was suggested by K. I. Churyumov	JPL · 14624
14627 Emilkowalski	1998 VA	Emil Kowalski (1918–1994) of Syosset, New York, though not a scientist himself, encouraged and fostered the discoverer's childhood interest in observational astronomy and space technology.	MPC · 14627
14631 Benbryan	1998 VS_{32}	Ben H. Bryan (born 1980) is the Lockheed Martin floor lead for the OSIRIS-REx Asteroid Sample Return Mission. He was also the lead manufacturing engineer for the OSIRIS-REx structure, a role he also performed on the Orion heat shield.	JPL · 14631
14632 Flensburg	1998 VY_{33}	Situated at the end of the beautiful firth, Flensburg is the most northern city in Germany. It is a bilingual town at the Danish border and hometown of the discoverer, who lived there for more than 20 years	JPL · 14632
14643 Morata	1998 WZ_{30}	Didier (born 1954) and Stephane (born 1977) Morata observe with a 0.30-m telescope from Martigues, in southern France. They have discovered novae in M31 and minor planets and are now undertaking spectroscopy of Be-type stars. Stephane is studying physics, and Didier is a chemist and editor of the magazine CCD et telescope	JPL · 14643
14654 Rajivgupta	1998 YV_{16}	Rajiv Gupta (born 1958) is a Canadian mathematician who has been a faculty member at the University of British Columbia since 1984. He has edited the Observer's Handbook of the Royal Astronomical Society of Canada since 2001 and began a term as president of the Society in 2002.	JPL · 14654
14656 Lijiang	1998 YN_{22}	Lijiang City, in the northwest of Yunnan Province in China, is in the center of the World Natural Heritage "Three Parallel Rivers of Yunnan Protected Areas" and contains the World Cultural Heritage "Old Town of Lijiang"	JPL · 14656
14659 Gregoriana	1999 AF_{24}	The Pontifical Gregorian University dates its origin to the founding of the Roman College in 1551. The name was suggested by Vatican astronomer G. Consolmagno on the occasion of the 64th meeting of Meteoritical Society in Rome in Sept. 2001	JPL · 14659
14664 Vandervelden	1999 BY_{25}	Erwin Van der Velden (1966–2005), an Australian astrophotographer who was active and valued member of the Brisbane and Southern (Australian) Astronomical Societies. He developed supreme imaging techniques for planetary and deep-sky objects taken by a Digital SLR camera and a Web-Cam.	JPL · 14664
14669 Beletic	1999 DC	James William Beletic (born 1956), a physicist. Asteroid awarded by Cyril Cavadore of the European Southern Observatory's Optical Detector Team, which J. Beletic led from 1994 Nov. 1 to 2000 Apr. 27. †	MPC · 14669
14674 INAOE	1999 UD_{5}	The Instituto Nacional de Astrofisica, Optica y Electronica (INAOE) is located in Tonantzitla, Puebla, Mexico, is a prominent Mexican center for research and graduate education in astronomy and astrophysics. It operates several observatories	JPL · 14674
14678 Pinney	1999 XN_{33}	Stacie Pinney, 2001 DYSC mentor. Pinney is a teacher at the Annunciation Catholic Academy, Altamonte, Florida	JPL · 14678
14679 Susanreed	1999 XN_{42}	Susan K. Reed, 2001 DYSC mentor. Reed is a teacher at the Bernalillo Middle School, Bernalillo, New Mexico	JPL · 14679
14681 Estellechurch	1999 XW_{108}	Estelle C. Church (born 1980) is a Lockheed Martin test engineer for the OSIRIS-REx Asteroid Sample Return Mission, focusing on the integration of the guidance system and the asteroid encounter mission phase. She also worked on the Juno and MAVEN missions and as an optics engineer.	JPL · 14681
14682 Davidhirsch	1999 XY_{110}	David Hirsch (born 1973) is the Lockheed Martin Flight Software (FSW) Lead and Certified Principal Engineer (CPE) for the OSIRIS-REx Asteroid Sample Return Mission. He was also the FSW CPE for the MAVEN mission and the FSW Integrator for the Phoenix Mars Lander, MRO, Juno and Genesis missions.	JPL · 14682
14683 Remy	1999 XG_{156}	Jennifer M. Remy, 2001 DYSC mentor. Remy is a teacher at the Springville Middle School, Springville, Utah	JPL · 14683
14684 Reyes	1999 XQ_{167}	Cynthia L. Reyes, 2001 DYSC mentor. Reyes is a teacher at the Seven Springs Middle School, New Port Richey, Florida	JPL · 14684
14693 Selwyn	2000 AH_{144}	Marilyn Selwyn, 2001 DYSC mentor. Selwyn is a teacher at the Tanque Verde Elementary School, Tucson, Arizona	JPL · 14693
14694 Skurat	2000 AR_{145}	Sister Karen Skurat, 2001 DYSC mentor. Skurat is a teacher at the St. Rita School, Hamden, Connecticut	JPL · 14694
14696 Lindawilliams	2000 AW_{203}	Linda H. Williams, 2001 DYSC mentor. Williams is a teacher at the Beech Grove Middle School, Beech Grove, Indiana	JPL · 14696
14697 Ronsawyer	2000 AO_{214}	Ron Sawyer (born 1955) is a Canadian amateur astronomer who is active in the Royal Astronomical Society of Canada, London Centre, and edited the London Centre's newsletter in the late 1970s. He helped organize the Society's General Assemblies in London, Ontario, in 1979 and 2001.	JPL · 14697
14698 Scottyoung	2000 AT_{230}	Scott Douglas Young (born 1971), of the Manitoba Planetarium, was director of the Alice G. Wallace Planetarium in Fitchburg, Massachusetts, during 1996–1999.	JPL · 14698
14699 Klarasmi	2000 AV_{239}	Klara Evgenyevna Smirnova (1936–2003) was a renowned Ukrainian philologist. Head of the English department at Kiev Shevchenko University, she was also an amateur astronomer and obtained several images of comet 1P/Halley during 1985–1986 using the Kiev 0.20-m refractor. The name was suggested by K. I. Churyumov	JPL · 14699
14700 Johnreid	2000 AC_{240}	Geologist John Barlow Reid (born 1940), a teacher for 30 years at Hampshire College, Massachusetts, has studied the earth and moon using isotopic methods. He also developed archaeological evidence for slavery migration and the life and health of past populations. The name was suggested by L. A. McFadden and R. Bedell	JPL · 14700

== 14701–14800 ==
back to top

Named minor planet	Provisional	This minor planet was named for...	Ref; Catalog
14701 Aizu	2000 AO_{240}	Aizu is the westernmost third of Fukushima prefecture, Japan.	JPL · 14701
14702 Benclark	2000 AY_{242}	Benton C. Clark III (born 1937), chief scientist at Space Exploration Systems of Lockheed Martin.	JPL · 14702
14708 Slaven	2000 CU_{26}	Kathy Slaven, 2001 DYSC mentor. Slaven is a teacher at the Beech Grove Middle School, Beech Grove, Indiana.	JPL · 14708
14719 Sobey	2000 CB_{85}	Glen Sobey, 2001 DYSC mentor. Sobey is a teacher at the Keystone Junior High School, San Antonio, Texas.	JPL · 14719
14724 SNO	2000 CA_{100}	The Sudbury Neutrino Observatory (SNO) †	MPC · 14724
14727 Suggs	2000 DU_{11}	Robert Michael Suggs (born 1955) began working for NASA in 1994 and is space environments team lead in the Engineering Directorate at Marshall Space Flight Center.	JPL · 14727
14728 Schuchardt	2000 DY_{14}	Maria Schuchardt (born 1955) is the data manager for the Lunar and Planetary Laboratory Space Imagery Center at the University of Arizona. She is also the LPL photographer and involved in many LPL outreach activities, including support for many NASA spacecraft missions	JPL · 14728
14734 Susanstoker	2000 DZ_{78}	Susan L. Stoker, 2001 DYSC mentor. Stoker is a teacher at the Edgewood Middle School, Moriarty, New Mexico.	JPL · 14734
14739 Edgarchavez	2000 EF_{21}	Edgar Chavez (born 1957) is an engineer who services electron microprobes at research institutions (such as the Lunar and Planetary Laboratory at the University of Arizona) used to analyze a variety of meteorites, terrestrial rocks and manmade materials	JPL · 14739
14741 Teamequinox	2000 EQ_{49}	{\tt e.quinox} is a student-led organization established at Imperial College, London, that won the IEEE's 2010 "Change the World" competition. Their winning project uses their engineering knowledge to provide a sustainable rural electrification system in developing countries in a scalable and economically viable manner	JPL · 14741
14764 Kilauea	7072 P-L	Kilauea, the active volcano on Hawaii.	JPL · 14764
14789 GAISH	1969 TY_{1}	GAISh (ГАИШ), Moscow University's Sternberg Astronomical Institute, founded in 1931 on the site of the observatory established by the university in 1831	JPL · 14789
14790 Beletskij	1970 OF	Vladimir Vasil'evich Beletskij (born 1930), a corresponding member of the Russian Academy of Sciences and professor of Moscow University, is a prominent expert in celestial mechanics and spaceflight theory. He developed a nonlinear theory for the rotation and orientation of natural celestial bodies and artificial satellites	JPL · 14790
14791 Atreus	1973 SU	Atreus was the son of Pelops, father of Agamemnon and Menelaos and brother of Thyestes	JPL · 14791
14792 Thyestes	1973 SG_{1}	Thyestes was the son of Pelops and brother of Atreus. Atreus killed the children of Thyestes and gave them to Thyestes to eat. Because of this Thyestes cursed the family of Atreus	JPL · 14792
14793 Gardner-Vandy	1975 SE_{2}	Kathryn Gardner-Vandy, American planetary scientist at Oklahoma State University and citizen of the Choctaw Nation.	IAU · 14793
14794 Konetskiy	1976 SD_{5}	Victor Victorovich Konetskiy (1929–2002) was a Russian writer who also became the captain of an ocean-going ship in the Arctic Ocean. He was the author of more than 50 well-known novels, stories and film scripts.	JPL · 14794
14795 Syoyou	1977 EE_{7}	Tubouchi Syoyou (1859–1935) accomplished the first complete translation of Shakespeare's dramas into Japanese. These works inspired the first discoverer to write his book Shakespearean Star Stories	JPL · 14795
14796 Emmabullock	1977 XF_{2}	Emma Bullock, British planetary scientist at Carnegie Science in Washington, DC.	IAU · 14796
14797 Timrose	1977 XZ_{2}	Timothy R. Rose, American geologist and Director of the Analytical Laboratories in the Department of Mineral Sciences at the Smithsonian National Museum of Natural History.	IAU · 14797
14799 Mitchschulte	1979 MS_{2}	Mitchell D. Schulte (b. 1965) is an American Program Scientist in the Planetary Science Division, NASA HQ, Washington, DC.	IAU · 14799

== 14801–14900 ==
back to top

Named minor planet	Provisional	This minor planet was named for...	Ref; Catalog
14802 Robwardell	1981 DJ_{2}	Lynn Rob Wardell, American-born Museum Specialist in the Department of Mineral Sciences at the Smithsonian National Museum of Natural History.	IAU · 14802
14804 Mariekschmidt	1981 EW_{13}	Mariek Schmidt, American planetary scientist at Brock University in Ontario, Canada.	IAU · 14804
14805 Amandaostwald	1981 ED_{15}	Amanda Ostwald, American planetary scientist at Michigan State University.	IAU · 14805
14806 Karner	1981 EV_{25}	James Karner, American planetary scientist at the University of Utah.	IAU · 14806
14807 Chrisanders	1981 EN_{26}	Chris Anders, American contractor in the Division of Meteorites at the Smithsonian National Museum of Natural History.	IAU · 14807
14808 Mijjum	1981 EV_{27}	Moshammat Mijjum, American planetary scientist and Postdoctoral Fellow at the Smithsonian National Museum of Natural History.	IAU · 14808
14809 Zoewilbur	1981 ES_{28}	Zoe E. Wilbur, American planetary scientist and Postdoctoral Fellow at the Smithsonian National Museum of Natural History.	IAU · 14809
14812 Rosario	1981 JR_{1}	Rosario, Argentina	JPL · 14812
14814 Gurij	1981 RL_{2}	Gurij Timofeevich Petrovsky (born 1931), director of the Vavilov State Optical Institute and president of the Rozhdestvensky International Optical Society.	JPL · 14814
14815 Rutberg	1981 TH_{3}	Filipp Grigor'evich Rutberg (born 1931), a Russian expert in electrophysics, is director of the Institute of Problems of Electrophysics in St. Petersburg.	JPL · 14815
14818 Mindeli	1982 UF_{7}	Elisbar Mindeli (1910–1980), a noted expert in coal mining, was the director of the Institute of Mountain Mechanics (1973–1980) and a corresponding member of the Georgian Academy of Sciences (1979–1980)	JPL · 14818
14819 Nikolaylaverov	1982 UC_{11}	Nikolay Pavlovich Laverov (born 1930), vice-president of the Russian Academy of Sciences, is an outstanding scientist, author of classical works in uranium geology and geochemistry, radiogeoecology, new energy sources and environmental protection	JPL · 14819
14820 Aizuyaichi	1982 VF_{4}	Aizu Yaichi (1881–1956), a student of Japanese classical literature and a poet of Japanese 31-syllable poems. He greatly admired the poet Ryokan.	JPL · 14820
14821 Motaeno	1982 VG_{4}	Motaeno-Minato was the old name of Tamashima Port, Okayama Prefecture, in the Edo period.	JPL · 14821
14825 Fieber-Beyer	1985 RQ	Sherry K. Fieber-Beyer (born 1975), a post-doctoral researcher and director of undergraduate studies at the Department of Space Studies, University of North Dakota.	JPL · 14825
14826 Nicollier	1985 SC_{1}	Claude Nicollier (born 1944), the first European mission specialist of NASA.	JPL · 14826
14827 Hypnos	1986 JK	Hypnos, the Greek god of sleep and twin brother of death. He entered the sleep of mortals and gave them, at the bidding of the Olympians, dreams of foolishness or inspiration, depending on the individual and their divine protectors or enemies.	JPL · 14827
14829 Povalyaeva	1986 TR_{11}	Marina Petrovna Povalyaeva (born 1956) is head of the program "Telephone communication for invalids" and organizer of charitable help to the children's branch of the central clinical hospital of the Simferopol area in Ukraine. She was decorated with the Order of Saint Peter and Paul and Order "For patriotism".	JPL · 14829
14831 Gentileschi	1987 BS_{1}	Artemisia Gentileschi (1593–c. 1656), an Italian painter, the only daughter of the Italian painter Orazio Gentileschi.	JPL · 14831
14832 Alechinsky	1987 QC_{3}	Pierre Alechinsky, a Belgian painter.	JPL · 14832
14833 Vilenius	1987 SP_{1}	Esa Vilenius (born 1974), a postdoctoral researcher at the Max Planck Institut f{ü}r extraterrestrische Physik in Garching, Germany.	JPL · 14833
14834 Isaev	1987 SR_{17}	Aleksej Mikhajlovich Isaev (1908–1971), the general designer and a laureate of many awards, was involved in the construction of liquid-propellant engines for many spacecraft, space apparatus and orbital stations.	JPL · 14834
14835 Holdridge	1987 WF_{1}	Mark E. Holdridge (born 1960), an operations manager at the Applied Physics Laboratory of Johns Hopkins University.	JPL · 14835
14836 Maxfrisch	1988 CY	Max Frisch (1911–1991), Swiss writer and playwright.	JPL · 14836
14843 Tanna	1988 VP_{3}	Tanna, the name of a railroad tunnel on the Tokaido main line, Japan, that runs for 7804 meters between Atami and Kannami	JPL · 14843
14845 Hegel	1988 VS_{6}	Georg Wilhelm Friedrich Hegel, German philosopher.	JPL · 14845
14846 Lampedusa	1989 BH	Italian writer Giuseppe Tomasi di Lampedusa (1896–1957) is famous for Il Gattopardo, whose fictional protagonist, Prince Fabrizio Salina, modeled on the author's own grandfather, was an amateur astronomer who discovered and named minor planets "Salina" in honor of his family and "Svelto" in memory of his favorite dog.	JPL · 14846
14850 Nagashimacho	1989 QH	Nagashimacho, a town located in the northwestern part of Kagoshima Prefecture, Japan. JPL	MPC · 14850
14853 Shimokawa	1989 SX	Yoji Shimokawa (born 1956) is a Japanese amateur astronomer. His major astronomical interest is the photography of nebula and star clusters, and he is active in organizing local star parties for amateur astronomers.	JPL · 14853
14871 Pyramus	1990 TH_{7}	In classic literature, Pyramus and Thisbe are two lovers whose union is prevented by their opposing parents and whose lives end in a tragic double suicide. The two lovers are now finally united forever in the minor-planet belt.	JPL · 14871
14872 Hoher List	1990 UR	The Observatory of Hoher List, in the Ardennes near Daun (Eifel), was established in 1957 by the University of Bonn.	JPL · 14872
14873 Shoyo	1990 UQ_{2}	Shoyo Senior High School in Takasago has departments in home economics, commercial studies and general education. Shoyo means the evergreen pine tree and the glorious sun. To be spirited, progressive, autonomous and cooperative is the motto of this comprehensive school, of which the second discoverer is a graduate.	JPL · 14873
14876 Dampier	1990 WD_{2}	William Dampier, sailor and the first to circumnavigate the Earth three times.	JPL · 14876
14877 Zauberflöte	1990 WC_{9}	Die Zauberflöte (The Magic Flute), opera by Wolfgang Amadeus Mozart (named on the occasion of the 250th anniversary of Mozart's birth)	JPL · 14877
14880 Moa	1991 CJ_{1}	A giant flightless bird of New Zealand thought to have become extinct by A.D. 1400, MOA is also the acronym of the project Microlensing Observations in Astrophysics which involves New Zealand and Japanese universities.	JPL · 14880
14885 Paskoff	1991 RF_{2}	Marie-Claude Paskoff, chief editor of the astronomical journal L'Astronomie, founded by Flammarion in 1882.	JPL · 14885
14888 Kanazawashi	1991 SN_{1}	Kanazawa ("Little Kyoto"), Ishikawa prefecture, Japan	JPL · 14888

== 14901–15000 ==
back to top

Named minor planet	Provisional	This minor planet was named for...	Ref; Catalog
14901 Hidatakayama	1992 SH	Hida Takayama city is located in the north of the Hida Mountains in the heart of Japan.	JPL · 14901
14902 Miyairi	1993 BE_{2}	Keinosuke Miyairi (1865–1946), of Kyushu Imperial University, a pioneer in epidemiology, discovered that the snail now called "Miyairi-gai" is an intermediate host for transmission of shistosoma japonicum infection. This enabled schistosomiasis to be controlled.	JPL · 14902
14909 Kamchatka	1993 PY_{3}	Kamchatka Peninsula	JPL · 14909
14911 Fukamatsu	1993 RH_{2}	Daihei Fukamatsu (born 1956) is a Japanese amateur astronomer with a strong interest in the development of astronomical teaching materials. He has carried out orbital calculations for comets since joining the Fukuoka Astronomical Society in 1978.	JPL · 14911
14914 Moreux	1993 TM_{26}	Théophile Moreux (1867–1954), commonly known as "Abbé Moreux", was a French astronomer and meteorologist.	JPL · 14914
14917 Taco	1994 AD_{11}	Kenneth Dale "Taco" Cockrell (born 1950), an engineer and pilot with NASA from 1987 to 1990, was then selected as an astronaut and flew on space shuttle missions STS-56, STS-69, STS-80, STS-98 and STS-111.	JPL · 14917
14918 Gonzálezalegre	1994 BP_{4}	José González Alegre y Álvarez, Spanish lawyer from Oviedo, Asturias.	IAU · 14918
14919 Robertohaver	1994 PG	Roberto Haver (born 1961) is an Italian amateur astronomer who has been actively involved in observing and studying comets and meteors for more than 20 years. He planned a search for comet 109P/Swift-Tuttle in 1992 with the Schmidt telescope at Cima Ekar and later found prerecovery images.	JPL · 14919
14922 Ohyama	1994 TA_{3}	Tetsuya Ohyama (born 1959) is a Japanese amateur astronomer skilled in the making of his own personal observatories.	JPL · 14922
14925 Naoko	1994 VU_{2}	Yamazaki (Sumino) Naoko, Japanese astronaut	JPL · 14925
14926 Hoshide	1994 VB_{3}	Hoshide Akihiko, Japanese astronaut	JPL · 14926
14927 Satoshi	1994 VW_{6}	Furukawa Satoshi, Japanese astronaut	JPL · 14927
14937 Thirsk	1995 CP_{3}	Robert Brent Thirsk, Canadian astronaut †	MPC · 14937
14939 Norikura	1995 DG_{1}	Mount Norikura (3026 m high), part of the northern Japan Alps, is an extinct volcano, located at the boundary of Nagano and Gifu prefectures.	JPL · 14939
14940 Freiligrath	1995 EL_{8}	Ferdinand Freiligrath (1810–1876), a German poet who pleaded in his poetry for democratic and social reforms and for liberty. Because he yearned for a national uprising, he was shadowed at times. At the end of his life, in Bismarck's time, he became a patriotic poet.	JPL · 14940
14941 Tomswift	1995 FY_{2}	Tom Swift and Tom Swift, Junior, were fictional father-and-son geniuses whose scientific adventures, in successive series of novels, inspired generations of young readers throughout the twentieth century to pursue science.	JPL · 14941
14942 Stevebaker	1995 MA	Steve Baker (born 1967), a key member of the Air Force Maui Optical and Supercomputing (AMOS) team.	JPL · 14942
14947 Luigibussolino	1996 AB_{4}	Luigi Bussolino, Italian aerospace engineer.	JPL · 14947
14948 Bartuška	1996 BA	Josef Bartuška (1898–1963) was a Czech avant-garde poet, painter, graphic artist, photographer and teacher. He also experimented with photograms and collages. In the inter-war period he belonged to the most significant artists of the South Bohemian art group, Linie	JPL · 14948
14950 Alexandradelbo	1996 BE_{2}	Alexandra Delbo (b. 2020), the daughter of planetary scientists Marco Delbo and Chrysa Avdellidou.	IAU · 14950
14953 Bevilacqua	1996 CB_{3}	Franco Bevilacqua (born 1937) is an Italian space engineer.	JPL · 14953
14959 TRIUMF	1996 JT_{3}	The Tri-University Meson Facility (TRIUMF) †	MPC · 14959
14960 Yule	1996 KO	George Udny Yule (1871–1951), statistician, lecturer at University College, London, and fellow of St. John's College, Cambridge.	JPL · 14960
14961 d'Auteroche	1996 LV_{3}	Jean-Baptiste Chappe d'Auteroche (1722–1769), a French astronomer who dedicated his life to observational astronomy. He observed the 1761 transit of Venus from Tobolsk and later published his Voyage en Siberie. In 1769, he went to observe the next transit in Baja California and perished in an epidemic shortly after making his observations.	JPL · 14961
14962 Masanoriabe	1996 TL_{15}	Masanori Abe (born 1958) became a member of the Nanyo Astronomical Lovers Club in 1987 and actively popularizes astronomy	JPL · 14962
14963 Toshikazu	1996 TM_{15}	Toshikazu Kanno (born 1959), a science teacher in junior high-school, has been a member of the Nanyo Astronomical Lovers Club since 1987 and actively popularizes astronomy	JPL · 14963
14964 Robertobacci	1996 VS	Roberto Bacci (born 1965), an active Italian amateur astronomer since his adolescence, has turned his primary interest to variable stars and meteors.	JPL · 14964
14965 Bonk	1997 KC	Werner Bonk (born 1923) is a German engineer and amateur astronomer who has measured several hundred positions of minor planets. He introduced the discoverer to astrometry and provided him with assistance and encouragement for many years.	MPC · 14965
14966 Jurijvega	1997 OU_{2}	Jurij Vega, Slovenian mathematician and military engineer, on the occasion of the 100th anniversary of the Jurij Vega Grammar School in Idrija, which the discoverer attended †	MPC · 14966
14967 Madrid	1997 PF_{4}	Madrid, capital city of Spain, is the birthplace and hometown of the second discoverer, Rafael Pacheco.	JPL · 14967
14968 Kubáček	1997 QG	Dalibor Kubácek (born 1957) worked at the Slovak Academy of Sciences in Bratislava, where he studied the structure of cometary comae by means of image processing. He willingly taught students and friends (including the discoverers) and helped to explain to them this relatively unknown procedure.	JPL · 14968
14969 Willacather	1997 QC_{1}	Willa Cather (1873–1947) was an American novelist and Pulitzer Prize-winner. Born in Virginia, she moved to Nebraska in 1883. Her early life on the prairie and sympathy for the immigrant pioneer influenced her mature years and shows in her best-known novels, My Antonia and Death Comes for the Archbishop.	JPL · 14969
14972 Olihainaut	1997 QP_{3}	Olivier R. Hainaut (born 1966) is a Belgian astronomer and discoverer of minor planets who is a specialist on distant comets and trans-Neptunian objects. An active observer and recoverer of several comets, he now heads the New Technology Telescope of the European Southern Observatory in La Silla.	JPL · 14972
14973 Rossirosina	1997 RZ	Rosina Rossi (born 1934), mother of the Italian discoverer Andrea Boattini	MPC · 14973
14974 Počátky	1997 SK_{1}	Počátky, a town in south Bohemia, the Czech Republic, where the discoverer Miloš Tichý was born †	MPC · 14974
14975 Serasin	1997 SA_{3}	Antonietta Serasin (born 1957) is an Italian amateur astronomer who lives in Padua.	MPC · 14975
14976 Josefčapek	1997 SD_{4}	Josef Čapek (1887–1945), was a Czech artist with wide interests, including painting, graphic arts and writing, authoring stories for children and coauthoring dramas together with his brother Karel. Part of his art was influenced by the growing threat posed by the fascists to Czechoslovakia in the 1930s.	JPL · 14976
14977 Bressler	1997 SE_{4}	Martin Bressler (1912–2009), was an Austrian amateur astronomer who started his astrometric program on minor planets in 1982. Always eager to learn new techniques, he enthusiastically switched from photographic emulsions to a CCD in 1993.	JPL · 14977
14980 Gustavbrom	1997 TW_{9}	Gustav Brom (Gustav Frkal), Czech 20th-century jazz musician, conductor, composer and singer	JPL · 14980
14981 Uenoiwakura	1997 TY_{17}	Iwakura High School was established in 1897 as a private railroad high school in Ueno.	JPL · 14981
14988 Tryggvason	1997 UA_{7}	Bjarni Tryggvason, Icelandic-Canadian astronaut †	MPC · 14988
14989 Tutte	1997 UB_{7}	William Tutte, Canadian mathematician †	MPC · 14989
14990 Zermelo	1997 UY_{10}	Ernst F. F. Zermelo (1871–1953), German mathematician.	JPL · 14990
14994 Uppenkamp	1997 UW_{18}	Wolfgang Uppenkamp (born 1953) a German teacher of English and German literature at the Pascal-Gymnasium in Grevenbroich, North Rhine-Westphalia. He uses innovative media to inspire his students.	JPL · 14994
14995 Archytas	1997 VY_{1}	Archytas (ca. 428-365 B.C.), a philosopher and mathematician of the Pythagorean school.	MPC · 14995
14998 Ogosemachi	1997 VU_{6}	Ogosemachi is a Japanese town in the center of Saitama Prefecture. It is famous for Kuroyama-santaki, three waterfalls in the Prefectural Kuroyama Nature Park, and Echigo Ume Grove, one of the three famous ume groves in the Kanto district.	JPL · 14998
14999 Karasaki	1997 VX_{8}	Hideyoshi Karasaki, Japanese occultation observer.	IAU · 14999
15000 CCD	1997 WZ_{16}	A charge-coupled device (CCD) is a two-dimensional array of light-sensitive microelectronic semiconductor capacitors. It is used as an imaging detector. With its high sensitivity and stability, the CCD has almost completely replaced the photographic emulsion and photomultiplier as the detector of choice in quantitative scientific work.	MPC · 15000

back to top

Preceded by 13,001–14,000	Meanings of minor-planet names List of minor planets: 14,001–15,000	Succeeded by 15,001–16,000
