= Hiroshi Abe (astronomer) =

Japanese astronomer

Minor planets discovered: 28
see § List of discovered minor planets

Hiroshi Abe (安部 裕史, Abe Hiroshi; born 1958) is a Japanese amateur astronomer affiliated with the Yatsuka Observatory. He is noted for numerous discoveries, including his 2007 discovery of the Nova Vulpeculae, and 28 numbered minor planets during 1993–1999.

The main-belt asteroid 5379 Abehiroshi, discovered by Osamu Muramatsu in 1991 is named in his honor. The official naming citation was published by the Minor Planet Center on 28 July 1999 (M.P.C. 35482).

== List of discovered minor planets ==
7097 Yatsuka	8 October 1993	list^{[A]}
7837 Mutsumi	11 October 1993	list^{[A]}
8099 Okudoiyoshimi	8 October 1993	list^{[A]}
8113 Matsue	21 April 1996	list^{[B]}
8114 Lafcadio	24 April 1996	list
8120 Kobe	2 November 1997	list
8725 Keiko	5 October 1996	list
9985 Akiko	12 May 1996	list^{[B]}
11322 Aquamarine	23 August 1995	list
11682 Shiwaku	3 March 1998	list

13176 Kobedaitenken	21 April 1996	list^{[B]}
13643 Takushi	21 April 1996	list
14535 Kazuyukihanda	1 September 1997	list
16760 Masanori	11 October 1996	list
21262 Kanba	24 April 1996	list^{[B]}
28340 Yukihiro	13 March 1999	list
29431 Shijimi	12 April 1997	list
35286 Takaoakihiro	14 October 1996	list
(43996) 1997 QH	22 August 1997	list
48778 Shokoyukako	1 September 1997	list

48779 Mariko	1 September 1997	list
49699 Hidetakasato	3 November 1999	list
58622 Setoguchi	2 November 1997	list^{[A]}
(65783) 1995 UK	17 October 1995	list
(90925) 1997 RK_{5}	8 September 1997	list
120735 Ogawakiyoshi	7 October 1997	list
134402 Ieshimatoshiaki	1 September 1997	list
136824 Nonamikeiko	8 September 1997	list
Co-discovery made with:^{A} S. Miyasaka^{B} R. H. McNaught

== See also ==
- List of astronomers § H. Abe
- List of minor planet discoverers § H. Abe
