= SFA Observatory =

Observatory in Texas, US

- Organization: Stephen F. Austin State University
- Observatory code: 740
- Location: Nacogdoches, Texas
- Coordinates: 31.7599°N 94.6610°W
- Altitude: 148 meters (486 ft)
- Established: 1976
- Website: SFA Observatory

Telescopes
- 41" Telescope: 1.04 m reflector
- 18" Telescope: 0.46 m reflector
- SFAVSA: radio array

The SFA Observatory (SFA) is an astronomical observatory located 17 km (11 miles) north of Nacogdoches, Texas (USA). The observatory is owned and operated by Stephen F. Austin State University (SFASU), and opened in 1976. It is used for undergraduate instruction and for graduate-level research.

== Telescopes ==
- A 1.04 m (41 in) reflecting telescope built at SFAU based on the design of a telescope at Lick Observatory began operating in 1984. The primary mirror and three secondary mirrors were fabricated in the early 1960s for an unfinished telescope for the University of Texas–Pan American. It is used primarily for photoelectric photometry.
- A 0.46 m (18 in) Ritchey–Chrétien reflector has been in operation at SFASU since 1976, but was originally located on Eniwetok Atoll in the Marshall Islands where it was used by NASA to study the Moon for the Apollo program. It is used primarily for photoelectric photometry.
- The SFA Very Small Array (SFAVSA) is a radio telescope array with two 3.0 m (9.8 ft) dishes that was built as a thesis project. It is now used for instruction.

== See also ==
- McDonald Observatory
- List of astronomical observatories
