= Seidai Miyasaka =

Japanese astronomer

Asteroids discovered: 4
7097 Yatsuka	October 8, 1993	^{[1]}
7837 Mutsumi	October 11, 1993	^{[1]}
8099 Okudoiyoshimi	October 8, 1993	^{[1]}
58622 Setoguchi	November 2, 1997	^{[1]}
^{1} co-discovered with Hiroshi Abe

Seidai Miyasaka (宮坂 正大, Miyasaka Seidai; born 1955) is a Japanese astronomer. The Minor Planet Center credits him with the co-discovery of four asteroids he made with Japanese astronomer Hiroshi Abe during 1993–1997.

The outer main-belt asteroid 3555 Miyasaka was named in his honour by prolific astronomer Takao Kobayashi, with whom Miyasaka has been collaborating for many years, acknowledging the fact, that he is one of the few Japanese observers who devote themselves to follow-up observations.

== See also ==
- Category:Japanese astronomers
