= Meanings of minor-planet names: 69001–70000 =

As minor planet discoveries are confirmed, they are given a permanent number by the IAU's Minor Planet Center (MPC), and the discoverers can then submit names for them, following the IAU's naming conventions. The list below concerns those minor planets in the specified number-range that have received names, and explains the meanings of those names.

Official naming citations of newly named small Solar System bodies are approved and published in a bulletin by IAU's Working Group for Small Bodies Nomenclature (WGSBN). Before May 2021, citations were published in MPC's Minor Planet Circulars for many decades. Recent citations can also be found on the JPL Small-Body Database (SBDB). Until his death in 2016, German astronomer Lutz D. Schmadel compiled these citations into the Dictionary of Minor Planet Names (DMP) and regularly updated the collection.

Based on Paul Herget's The Names of the Minor Planets, Schmadel also researched the unclear origin of numerous asteroids, most of which had been named prior to World War II. This article incorporates text from this source, which is in the public domain: SBDB New namings may only be added to this list below after official publication as the preannouncement of names is condemned. The WGSBN publishes a comprehensive guideline for the naming rules of non-cometary small Solar System bodies.

== 69001–69100 ==
Named minor planet	Provisional	This minor planet was named for...	Ref · Catalog
There are no named minor planets in this number range

== 69101–69200 ==
back to top

Named minor planet	Provisional	This minor planet was named for...	Ref · Catalog
69159 Ivanking	2003 JE_{16}	Ivan R. King (born 1927), prominent astronomer working mainly on the studies of globular clusters. He is best known for a family of dynamical models that bear his name. He is a recipient of numerous professional honors and distinctions, including the Presidency of the American Astronomical Society.	JPL · 69159

== 69201–69300 ==
back to top

Named minor planet	Provisional	This minor planet was named for...	Ref · Catalog
69228 Kamerunberg	5173 T-3	Mount Cameroon (called Kamerunberg in German), the 4040-meter active volcano, situated in Cameroon near the Gulf of Guinea.	JPL · 69228
69230 Hermes	1937 UB	Hermes, from Greek mythology, messenger of the gods, son of Zeus and Maia. His attributes are the most complex and varied of those of any of the major gods. He was a deity of wealth, god of trade and travelers, of commerce, manual skill, oratory and eloquence, of thieves and of the wind. Named by the Astronomisches Rechen-Institut.	JPL · 69230
69231 Alettajacobs	1972 FE	Aletta Jacobs (1854–1929), the first Dutch woman to graduate from a university and the first Dutch female physician. She helped initiate The Hague Congress of 1915 that led to the formation of the Women's International League for Peace and Freedom. The name was suggested by L. E. Timmerman.	JPL · 69231
69239 Johnstarling	1978 XT	John Starling, surgeon, vocalist and co-founder of the renowned Seldom Scene bluegrass band.	IAU · 69239
69245 Persiceto	1981 EO	San Giovanni in Persiceto, a small Italian town near Bologna, where an enthusiastic group of amateur astronomers, with the strong support of the municipality, created the Museo del Cielo e della Terra, a large complex devoted to the popularization of the natural sciences, in particular astronomy.	JPL · 69245
69259 Savostyanov	1982 ST_{7}	Savostyanov Fedor Vasil'evich (1924–2012), a Russian painter who painted portraits, landscapes, genre and battle paintings.	JPL · 69259
69260 Tonyjudt	1982 TJ	Tony Judt (1948–2010), an English-American historian, essayist, and historian. He is the Erich Maria Remarque Professor in European Studies at New York University, known for his publications on Israel and France, and especially for his book Postwar: A History of Europe Since 1945.	JPL · 69260
69261 Philaret	1982 YM_{1}	Philaret (Vasily Mikhailovich Drozdov, 1783–1867), metropolitan bishop of Moscow and Kolomna, was an honorary member of the Imperial Academy of Sciences, and ordinary academician in the Department of Russian Language and Literature. Name suggested by N. N. Drozdov.	JPL · 69261
69263 Big Ben	1987 BB_{2}	Big Ben, at Westminster, is the nickname of both the great bell and clock tower of the world's largest four-faced chiming clock. In May 2009 it celebrated its 150th anniversary.	JPL · 69263
69264 Nebra	1988 PE_{4}	The German town of Nebra where the Nebra sky disk from the Bronze Age has been found. First documented in 876, it is located on the Unstrut river, 35 kilometers from Tautenburg, where the discovering observatory is located.	JPL · 69264
69273 Derbyastro	1989 TN_{1}	The Derby and District Astronomical Society is based in Derby, England and was founded in 1974 by Jane Kirk.	IAU · 69273
69275 Wiesenthal	1989 WD_{4}	Simon Wiesenthal (1908–2005), Austro-Hungarian Nazi war criminal hunter who survived the Nazi camps of World War II. After the war, he courageously gathered data on the perpetrators of the Holocaust. He wrote several books, including I Hunted Eichmann and The Murderers Among Us.	JPL · 69275
69286 von Liebig	1990 TN_{9}	Justus von Liebig (1803–1873), a German chemist and full professor who made many important contributions to the fields of inorganic and organic, biological and agricultural chemistry. Students from all over Europe came to study with him. He introduced the mineral fertilizers.	JPL · 69286
69287 Günthereichhorn	1990 TW_{10}	Günther Eichhorn (born 1945), a German-American astronomer who developed and managed the Astrophysics Data System from 1992 to 2007. For this work he was awarded the 2008 Award for Services in Astronomy from the Royal Astronomical Society.	JPL · 69287
69288 Berlioz	1990 TW_{11}	Hector Berlioz (1803–1869), French Romantic composer and critic who is known for his dramatic Symphonie fantastique and great Requiem. He is regarded as the founder of the Program music. His paper Treatise on Instrumentation served as a leading handbook for later tonalists.	JPL · 69288
69295 Stecklum	1991 TO_{6}	Bringfried Stecklum (born 1954) is a German astrophysicist working on star formation with emphasis on high angular resolution measurements. In 2010 he resumed asteroid observations using the Tautenburg 1.34-m Schmidt telescope, with the main focus on near-Earth object confirmation.	JPL · 69295

== 69301–69400 ==
back to top

Named minor planet	Provisional	This minor planet was named for...	Ref · Catalog
69311 Russ	1992 QC	Russell Mark Steel (born 1964), brother of Duncan Steel who discovered this minor planet	JPL · 69311
69312 Rogerbacon	1992 SH_{17}	Roger Bacon (c. 1219–1292), English philosopher	JPL · 69312

== 69401–69500 ==
back to top

Named minor planet	Provisional	This minor planet was named for...	Ref · Catalog
69406 Martz-Kohl	1995 SX_{48}	The US Martz-Kohl Observatory is located in Frewsburg, New York, named after Marshal Martz and Ron Kohl's, who built one of the world's largest amateur telescopes for the observatory in the 1950s (Src).	IAU · 69406
69421 Keizosaji	1995 YT_{2}	Keizo Saji (1919–1999), well-known businessman in Japan and the honorary chief of the Saji Astro Park	JPL · 69421
69423 Openuni	1996 AA_{2}	The Open University (founded 23 April 1969) is the world's leading university for flexible, innovative distance learning, having educated over 2 million part-time students. Through its research in astronomy, planetary and space science, the OU has a distinguished history of involvement in major Solar System exploration missions.	IAU · 69423
69434 de Gerlache	1996 HC_{21}	Adrien de Gerlache (1866–1934), Belgian naval officer who led the Belgian Antarctic Expedition of 1897 to 1899	JPL · 69434
69460 Christibarnard	1996 UO_{1}	Christiaan Barnard (1922–2001) was a South African cardiac surgeon who performed the world's first human-to-human heart transplant in 1967 .	JPL · 69460
69469 Krumbenowe	1996 WR	Krumbenowe (Chrumbenowe) is the oldest documented name of the town of Český Krumlov. Dating from the mid–13th century, the name seems to originate from German words "Krumben Ouwe", "Krumme Aue" (skew mead) or, maybe, from the much older "Wilt Ahwa" (wild water), referring to the Vltava river.	JPL · 69469
69496 Zaoryuzan	1997 AE_{22}	Zao Ryuzan, a 1362-meter mountain located to the southeast of Yamagata city, Yamagata prefecture, Japan	JPL · 69496
69500 Ginobartali	1997 CB_{6}	Gino Bartali (1914–2000), an Italian cyclist.	JPL · 69500

== 69501–69600 ==
back to top

Named minor planet	Provisional	This minor planet was named for...	Ref · Catalog
69556 Félixdelafuente	1997 SA_{31}	Félix Rodríguez de la Fuente, Spanish naturalist, educator, and documentary filmmaker.	IAU · 69556
69565 Giulioscarfi	1998 AZ_{4}	Giulio Scarfì (born 1964), an Italian amateur astronomer and discoverer of minor planets, who owns the Monte Viseggi Observatory (126) as well as the Iota Scorpii Observatory (K78) in Italy. His interests include asteroid photometry (rotational light-curves) and near-Earth object observations.	IAU · 69565
69585 Albertoraugei	1998 DN_{35}	Alberto Raugei (born 1963) has been an amateur astronomer at the Gruppo Astrofili Montelupo since 1995. He is the business consultant of the group.	IAU · 69585
69594 Ulferika	1998 FF_{11}	Erika (born 1940) and Ulf Lehmann (born 1939), the parents of the discoverer Gerhard Lehmann	JPL · 69594
69596 Balkowski	1998 FT_{14}	Chantal Balkowski, French astronomer.	IAU · 69596

== 69601–69700 ==
back to top

Named minor planet	Provisional	This minor planet was named for...	Ref · Catalog
There are no named minor planets in this number range

== 69701–69800 ==
back to top

Named minor planet	Provisional	This minor planet was named for...	Ref · Catalog
69754 Mosesmendel	1998 MM_{39}	Moses Mendelssohn (1729–1786), German-Jewish philosopher	JPL · 69754
69756 Hélènecourtois	1998 OY_{3}	Hélène Courtois, French astrophysicist.	IAU · 69756

== 69801–69900 ==
back to top

Named minor planet	Provisional	This minor planet was named for...	Ref · Catalog
69839 Denishuber	1998 SJ_{10}	Denis Huber, French geotechnical engineer.	IAU · 69869
69848 Thomaspetit	1998 SQ_{35}	Thomas Petit, French amateur astronomer.	IAU · 69848
69869 Haining	1998 SX_{62}	The Chinese Haining City, located at the southern tip of the Yangtze River in northern Zhejiang province	JPL · 69869
69870 Fizeau	1998 SM_{64}	Hyppolite Fizeau (1819–1896), a French physicist who improved photographic processes	JPL · 69870

== 69901–70000 ==
back to top

Named minor planet	Provisional	This minor planet was named for...	Ref · Catalog
69949 Thierrydemange	1998 VN_{4}	Thierry Demange, French amateur astrophotographer.	IAU · 69949
69961 Millosevich	1998 VS_{33}	Elia Millosevich (1848–1919), Italian astronomer and discoverer of minor planets	MPC · 69961
69971 Tanzi	1998 WD_{2}	Pepe Tanzi (born 1945), Italian lighting industrial designer	JPL · 69971
69977 Saurodonati	1998 WL_{9}	Sauro Donati (born 1959), Italian amateur astronomer and discoverer of minor planets	JPL · 69977

back to top

Preceded by 68,001–69,000	Meanings of minor-planet names List of minor planets: 69,001–70,000	Succeeded by 70,001–71,000
