= Luigi Sannino =

Italian amateur astronomer

Asteroids discovered : 2
12575 Palmaria	September 4, 1999	with Paolo Pietrapiana
69565 Giulioscarfi	January 5, 1998	with Paolo Pietrapiana

Luigi Sannino (born 1981) is an Italian amateur astronomer. He is credited by the Minor Planet Center with the discovery of two asteroids in collaboration with Paolo Pietrapiana at the Monte Viseggi Observatory.

Sannino discovered (69565) 1998 AZ4 at age 18, making him the youngest asteroid discoverer in the world as of 2017.
