= List of minor planets: 69001–70000 =

The following is a partial list of minor planets, running from minor-planet number 69001 through 70000, inclusive. The primary data for this and other partial lists is based on JPL's "Small-Body Orbital Elements" and data available from the Minor Planet Center. Critical list information is also provided by the MPC, unless otherwise specified from Lowell Observatory. A detailed description of the table's columns and additional sources are given on the main page including a complete list of every page in this series, and a statistical break-up on the dynamical classification of minor planets.

Also see the summary list of all named bodies in numerical and alphabetical order, and the corresponding naming citations for the number range of this particular list. New namings may only be added to this list after official publication, as the preannouncement of names is condemned by the Working Group for Small Bodies Nomenclature of the International Astronomical Union.

Near-Earth obj.	MBA (inner)	MBA (outer)	Centaur
Mars-crosser	MBA (middle)	Jupiter trojan	Trans-Neptunian obj.
Unclassified

== 69001–69100 ==
Designation			Discovery			Properties		Ref
Permanent	Provisional	Named after	Date	Site	Discoverer(s)	Category	Diam.	Ref
69001	2002 TM_{173}	—	October 4, 2002	Socorro	LINEAR	·	5.1 km	MPC · JPL
69002	2002 TX_{181}	—	October 3, 2002	Socorro	LINEAR	KOR	2.9 km	MPC · JPL
69003	2002 TK_{196}	—	October 3, 2002	Socorro	LINEAR	·	4.0 km	MPC · JPL
69004	2002 TL_{198}	—	October 5, 2002	Kitt Peak	Spacewatch	·	8.9 km	MPC · JPL
69005	2002 TZ_{207}	—	October 4, 2002	Socorro	LINEAR	·	7.1 km	MPC · JPL
69006	2002 TS_{212}	—	October 7, 2002	Haleakala	NEAT	·	4.4 km	MPC · JPL
69007	2002 TN_{217}	—	October 7, 2002	Socorro	LINEAR	·	7.0 km	MPC · JPL
69008	2002 TV_{240}	—	October 6, 2002	Haleakala	NEAT	·	2.9 km	MPC · JPL
69009	2002 TJ_{250}	—	October 7, 2002	Anderson Mesa	LONEOS	KOR	3.3 km	MPC · JPL
69010	2002 TD_{256}	—	October 9, 2002	Socorro	LINEAR	·	2.8 km	MPC · JPL
69011	2002 TF_{259}	—	October 9, 2002	Socorro	LINEAR	·	5.3 km	MPC · JPL
69012	2002 TC_{284}	—	October 10, 2002	Socorro	LINEAR	·	1.7 km	MPC · JPL
69013	2002 TP_{290}	—	October 10, 2002	Socorro	LINEAR	EOS	5.1 km	MPC · JPL
69014	2002 UD_{1}	—	October 24, 2002	Haleakala	NEAT	URS	16 km	MPC · JPL
69015	2002 UE_{26}	—	October 31, 2002	Socorro	LINEAR	·	2.5 km	MPC · JPL
69016	2002 UX_{32}	—	October 31, 2002	Anderson Mesa	LONEOS	·	2.2 km	MPC · JPL
69017	2002 UK_{49}	—	October 31, 2002	Socorro	LINEAR	·	4.0 km	MPC · JPL
69018	2002 VH_{24}	—	November 5, 2002	Fountain Hills	Hills, Fountain	·	9.5 km	MPC · JPL
69019	2002 VA_{35}	—	November 5, 2002	Socorro	LINEAR	·	4.7 km	MPC · JPL
69020	2002 VU_{51}	—	November 6, 2002	Anderson Mesa	LONEOS	·	8.0 km	MPC · JPL
69021	2002 VR_{53}	—	November 6, 2002	Socorro	LINEAR	·	7.7 km	MPC · JPL
69022	2002 VS_{62}	—	November 5, 2002	Anderson Mesa	LONEOS	NYS	3.1 km	MPC · JPL
69023	2002 VY_{63}	—	November 6, 2002	Anderson Mesa	LONEOS	·	1.9 km	MPC · JPL
69024	2002 VH_{70}	—	November 7, 2002	Socorro	LINEAR	·	3.5 km	MPC · JPL
69025	2002 VS_{84}	—	November 7, 2002	Socorro	LINEAR	(5)	2.4 km	MPC · JPL
69026	2002 VL_{93}	—	November 11, 2002	Essen	Essen	RAF · slow	6.7 km	MPC · JPL
69027	2002 VW_{95}	—	November 11, 2002	Anderson Mesa	LONEOS	·	1.5 km	MPC · JPL
69028	2002 VG_{109}	—	November 12, 2002	Socorro	LINEAR	·	2.6 km	MPC · JPL
69029	2002 VT_{119}	—	November 12, 2002	Socorro	LINEAR	EUN	3.0 km	MPC · JPL
69030	2002 WD_{9}	—	November 24, 2002	Anderson Mesa	LONEOS	MAR	2.7 km	MPC · JPL
69031	2002 WX_{16}	—	November 28, 2002	Haleakala	NEAT	·	3.0 km	MPC · JPL
69032	2002 WG_{17}	—	November 28, 2002	Haleakala	NEAT	T_{j} (2.95)	9.6 km	MPC · JPL
69033	2002 XA_{2}	—	December 1, 2002	Socorro	LINEAR	·	1.6 km	MPC · JPL
69034	2002 XE_{15}	—	December 2, 2002	Socorro	LINEAR	·	2.8 km	MPC · JPL
69035	2002 XR_{30}	—	December 6, 2002	Socorro	LINEAR	slow	3.5 km	MPC · JPL
69036	2002 XN_{31}	—	December 6, 2002	Socorro	LINEAR	EOS	7.2 km	MPC · JPL
69037	2002 XD_{43}	—	December 9, 2002	Kitt Peak	Spacewatch	PAD	4.6 km	MPC · JPL
69038	2002 XU_{44}	—	December 7, 2002	Palomar	NEAT	MAR	2.8 km	MPC · JPL
69039	2002 XG_{47}	—	December 8, 2002	Haleakala	NEAT	·	2.0 km	MPC · JPL
69040	2002 XH_{47}	—	December 8, 2002	Haleakala	NEAT	JUN	3.1 km	MPC · JPL
69041	2002 XF_{49}	—	December 10, 2002	Socorro	LINEAR	·	3.3 km	MPC · JPL
69042	2002 XY_{51}	—	December 10, 2002	Socorro	LINEAR	V	1.4 km	MPC · JPL
69043	2002 XJ_{55}	—	December 10, 2002	Palomar	NEAT	·	1.3 km	MPC · JPL
69044	2002 XP_{57}	—	December 10, 2002	Palomar	NEAT	·	4.0 km	MPC · JPL
69045	2002 XN_{59}	—	December 11, 2002	Socorro	LINEAR	·	4.3 km	MPC · JPL
69046	2002 XV_{61}	—	December 10, 2002	Palomar	NEAT	·	3.8 km	MPC · JPL
69047	2002 XM_{68}	—	December 12, 2002	Haleakala	NEAT	EUN · slow	3.0 km	MPC · JPL
69048	2002 XR_{70}	—	December 10, 2002	Socorro	LINEAR	·	3.7 km	MPC · JPL
69049	2002 XP_{76}	—	December 11, 2002	Socorro	LINEAR	MAR	2.2 km	MPC · JPL
69050	2002 XE_{78}	—	December 11, 2002	Palomar	NEAT	·	3.4 km	MPC · JPL
69051	2002 XT_{79}	—	December 11, 2002	Socorro	LINEAR	ARM	5.7 km	MPC · JPL
69052	2002 XC_{82}	—	December 11, 2002	Palomar	NEAT	·	4.4 km	MPC · JPL
69053	2002 YJ_{3}	—	December 27, 2002	Anderson Mesa	LONEOS	·	4.9 km	MPC · JPL
69054	2002 YP_{6}	—	December 28, 2002	Anderson Mesa	LONEOS	EOS	4.6 km	MPC · JPL
69055	2002 YE_{7}	—	December 28, 2002	Anderson Mesa	LONEOS	·	5.0 km	MPC · JPL
69056	2002 YE_{8}	—	December 28, 2002	Kitt Peak	Spacewatch	PHO	4.9 km	MPC · JPL
69057	2002 YA_{13}	—	December 31, 2002	Socorro	LINEAR	·	2.5 km	MPC · JPL
69058	2002 YV_{14}	—	December 31, 2002	Kitt Peak	Spacewatch	·	2.1 km	MPC · JPL
69059	2002 YL_{18}	—	December 31, 2002	Socorro	LINEAR	·	2.0 km	MPC · JPL
69060	2002 YO_{20}	—	December 31, 2002	Socorro	LINEAR	THM	5.8 km	MPC · JPL
69061	2002 YN_{28}	—	December 31, 2002	Socorro	LINEAR	·	4.1 km	MPC · JPL
69062	2002 YF_{29}	—	December 31, 2002	Socorro	LINEAR	·	3.3 km	MPC · JPL
69063	2002 YG_{32}	—	December 30, 2002	Haleakala	NEAT	·	3.5 km	MPC · JPL
69064	2003 AZ_{7}	—	January 2, 2003	Anderson Mesa	LONEOS	PHO	3.6 km	MPC · JPL
69065	2003 AY_{11}	—	January 1, 2003	Socorro	LINEAR	·	5.8 km	MPC · JPL
69066	2003 AY_{28}	—	January 4, 2003	Socorro	LINEAR	·	1.4 km	MPC · JPL
69067	2003 AJ_{30}	—	January 4, 2003	Socorro	LINEAR	MAS	1.6 km	MPC · JPL
69068	2003 AO_{32}	—	January 5, 2003	Socorro	LINEAR	·	2.0 km	MPC · JPL
69069	2003 AR_{37}	—	January 7, 2003	Socorro	LINEAR	·	3.9 km	MPC · JPL
69070	2003 AQ_{38}	—	January 7, 2003	Socorro	LINEAR	V	2.2 km	MPC · JPL
69071	2003 AR_{39}	—	January 7, 2003	Socorro	LINEAR	·	4.6 km	MPC · JPL
69072	2003 AG_{41}	—	January 7, 2003	Socorro	LINEAR	HNS	2.0 km	MPC · JPL
69073	2003 AB_{43}	—	January 5, 2003	Socorro	LINEAR	·	4.6 km	MPC · JPL
69074	2003 AC_{43}	—	January 5, 2003	Socorro	LINEAR	·	3.8 km	MPC · JPL
69075	2003 AZ_{52}	—	January 5, 2003	Anderson Mesa	LONEOS	·	2.4 km	MPC · JPL
69076	2003 AC_{53}	—	January 5, 2003	Socorro	LINEAR	V	1.5 km	MPC · JPL
69077	2003 AR_{53}	—	January 5, 2003	Socorro	LINEAR	·	1.1 km	MPC · JPL
69078	2003 AO_{55}	—	January 5, 2003	Socorro	LINEAR	·	1.7 km	MPC · JPL
69079	2003 AS_{60}	—	January 7, 2003	Socorro	LINEAR	NYS	2.1 km	MPC · JPL
69080	2003 AA_{62}	—	January 7, 2003	Socorro	LINEAR	BAR	3.5 km	MPC · JPL
69081	2003 AZ_{64}	—	January 7, 2003	Socorro	LINEAR	·	6.4 km	MPC · JPL
69082	2003 AY_{75}	—	January 10, 2003	Socorro	LINEAR	·	2.4 km	MPC · JPL
69083	2003 AX_{77}	—	January 10, 2003	Socorro	LINEAR	LUT	9.8 km	MPC · JPL
69084	2003 BB	—	January 16, 2003	Palomar	NEAT	NYS	1.7 km	MPC · JPL
69085	2003 BE_{2}	—	January 25, 2003	Anderson Mesa	LONEOS	·	1.6 km	MPC · JPL
69086	2003 BU_{6}	—	January 25, 2003	Anderson Mesa	LONEOS	EOS	5.5 km	MPC · JPL
69087	2003 BQ_{11}	—	January 26, 2003	Anderson Mesa	LONEOS	·	6.0 km	MPC · JPL
69088	2003 BS_{17}	—	January 27, 2003	Socorro	LINEAR	MAR	3.2 km	MPC · JPL
69089	2003 BN_{18}	—	January 27, 2003	Anderson Mesa	LONEOS	MAS	1.5 km	MPC · JPL
69090	2003 BH_{20}	—	January 27, 2003	Anderson Mesa	LONEOS	·	2.9 km	MPC · JPL
69091	2003 BE_{25}	—	January 25, 2003	Palomar	NEAT	·	5.1 km	MPC · JPL
69092	2003 BQ_{25}	—	January 26, 2003	Palomar	NEAT	EUN	2.5 km	MPC · JPL
69093	2003 BM_{48}	—	January 26, 2003	Anderson Mesa	LONEOS	THM	5.0 km	MPC · JPL
69094	2003 BA_{49}	—	January 26, 2003	Haleakala	NEAT	·	3.1 km	MPC · JPL
69095	2003 BE_{53}	—	January 27, 2003	Socorro	LINEAR	NYS ·	3.8 km	MPC · JPL
69096	2003 BG_{54}	—	January 27, 2003	Palomar	NEAT	·	3.6 km	MPC · JPL
69097	2003 BR_{54}	—	January 27, 2003	Palomar	NEAT	·	3.8 km	MPC · JPL
69098	2003 BZ_{59}	—	January 27, 2003	Socorro	LINEAR	·	1.5 km	MPC · JPL
69099	2003 BA_{63}	—	January 28, 2003	Socorro	LINEAR	·	5.2 km	MPC · JPL
69100	2003 BM_{68}	—	January 28, 2003	Socorro	LINEAR	·	4.4 km	MPC · JPL

== 69101–69200 ==
back to top

Designation			Discovery			Properties		Ref
Permanent	Provisional	Named after	Date	Site	Discoverer(s)	Category	Diam.	Ref
69101	2003 BJ_{72}	—	January 28, 2003	Palomar	NEAT	·	5.2 km	MPC · JPL
69102	2003 BB_{73}	—	January 28, 2003	Palomar	NEAT	·	4.6 km	MPC · JPL
69103	2003 BG_{80}	—	January 31, 2003	Anderson Mesa	LONEOS	·	8.6 km	MPC · JPL
69104	2003 BG_{84}	—	January 31, 2003	Socorro	LINEAR	·	1.7 km	MPC · JPL
69105	2003 BR_{88}	—	January 27, 2003	Socorro	LINEAR	EOS	5.6 km	MPC · JPL
69106	2003 CC_{3}	—	February 2, 2003	Socorro	LINEAR	·	1.6 km	MPC · JPL
69107	2003 CG_{8}	—	February 1, 2003	Socorro	LINEAR	RAF	3.1 km	MPC · JPL
69108	2003 CH_{8}	—	February 1, 2003	Socorro	LINEAR	·	6.2 km	MPC · JPL
69109	2003 CM_{8}	—	February 1, 2003	Kitt Peak	Spacewatch	NYS	1.7 km	MPC · JPL
69110	2003 CK_{10}	—	February 2, 2003	Socorro	LINEAR	PHO	2.1 km	MPC · JPL
69111	2003 CE_{17}	—	February 7, 2003	Desert Eagle	W. K. Y. Yeung	·	2.3 km	MPC · JPL
69112	2003 DO_{4}	—	February 21, 2003	Palomar	NEAT	·	3.0 km	MPC · JPL
69113	2003 DG_{10}	—	February 22, 2003	Palomar	NEAT	·	2.1 km	MPC · JPL
69114	2003 DV_{17}	—	February 26, 2003	Haleakala	NEAT	(3025)	10 km	MPC · JPL
69115	2003 DD_{21}	—	February 22, 2003	Palomar	NEAT	·	3.7 km	MPC · JPL
69116	2003 EX_{1}	—	March 3, 2003	Haleakala	NEAT	·	1.2 km	MPC · JPL
69117	2003 EX_{2}	—	March 6, 2003	Socorro	LINEAR	·	2.7 km	MPC · JPL
69118	2003 EK_{16}	—	March 8, 2003	Reedy Creek	J. Broughton	·	2.5 km	MPC · JPL
69119	2003 EA_{21}	—	March 6, 2003	Anderson Mesa	LONEOS	T_{j} (2.99) · EUP	8.5 km	MPC · JPL
69120	2003 ET_{23}	—	March 6, 2003	Socorro	LINEAR	·	5.6 km	MPC · JPL
69121	2003 EJ_{26}	—	March 6, 2003	Anderson Mesa	LONEOS	NYS	2.5 km	MPC · JPL
69122	2003 EZ_{30}	—	March 6, 2003	Palomar	NEAT	·	6.0 km	MPC · JPL
69123	2003 EP_{39}	—	March 8, 2003	Socorro	LINEAR	EUN	2.8 km	MPC · JPL
69124	2003 EQ_{39}	—	March 8, 2003	Socorro	LINEAR	·	8.8 km	MPC · JPL
69125	2003 EK_{43}	—	March 10, 2003	Kitt Peak	Spacewatch	·	2.3 km	MPC · JPL
69126	2003 EC_{60}	—	March 7, 2003	Goodricke-Pigott	R. A. Tucker	·	6.6 km	MPC · JPL
69127	2003 FK_{12}	—	March 22, 2003	Palomar	NEAT	·	7.8 km	MPC · JPL
69128	2003 FR_{16}	—	March 23, 2003	Haleakala	NEAT	·	5.2 km	MPC · JPL
69129	2003 FG_{21}	—	March 24, 2003	Kitt Peak	Spacewatch	·	4.8 km	MPC · JPL
69130	2003 FC_{39}	—	March 23, 2003	Haleakala	NEAT	·	3.1 km	MPC · JPL
69131	2003 FP_{47}	—	March 24, 2003	Kitt Peak	Spacewatch	·	3.7 km	MPC · JPL
69132	2003 FG_{49}	—	March 24, 2003	Kitt Peak	Spacewatch	·	3.1 km	MPC · JPL
69133	2003 FK_{54}	—	March 25, 2003	Palomar	NEAT	LUT	10 km	MPC · JPL
69134	2003 FJ_{70}	—	March 26, 2003	Kitt Peak	Spacewatch	·	3.9 km	MPC · JPL
69135	2003 FP_{74}	—	March 26, 2003	Palomar	NEAT	fast	3.3 km	MPC · JPL
69136	2003 FE_{85}	—	March 28, 2003	Kitt Peak	Spacewatch	·	6.1 km	MPC · JPL
69137	2003 FS_{87}	—	March 28, 2003	Palomar	NEAT	V	1.4 km	MPC · JPL
69138	2003 FY_{90}	—	March 29, 2003	Anderson Mesa	LONEOS	·	8.2 km	MPC · JPL
69139	2003 FH_{91}	—	March 29, 2003	Anderson Mesa	LONEOS	HNS	2.2 km	MPC · JPL
69140	2003 FB_{100}	—	March 31, 2003	Anderson Mesa	LONEOS	EOS	4.3 km	MPC · JPL
69141	2003 FT_{112}	—	March 31, 2003	Socorro	LINEAR	·	5.4 km	MPC · JPL
69142	2003 FL_{115}	—	March 31, 2003	Socorro	LINEAR	H	1.6 km	MPC · JPL
69143	2003 FN_{115}	—	March 31, 2003	Socorro	LINEAR	EUN	4.2 km	MPC · JPL
69144	2003 FU_{115}	—	March 31, 2003	Socorro	LINEAR	·	4.3 km	MPC · JPL
69145	2003 FF_{119}	—	March 26, 2003	Anderson Mesa	LONEOS	EOS	3.8 km	MPC · JPL
69146	2003 FV_{121}	—	March 25, 2003	Anderson Mesa	LONEOS	V	1.9 km	MPC · JPL
69147	2003 GR_{1}	—	April 1, 2003	Socorro	LINEAR	·	4.3 km	MPC · JPL
69148	2003 GH_{8}	—	April 3, 2003	Anderson Mesa	LONEOS	·	4.6 km	MPC · JPL
69149	2003 GQ_{12}	—	April 1, 2003	Socorro	LINEAR	CLO	5.4 km	MPC · JPL
69150	2003 GZ_{15}	—	April 5, 2003	Haleakala	NEAT	·	6.7 km	MPC · JPL
69151	2003 GZ_{41}	—	April 7, 2003	Palomar	NEAT	·	5.5 km	MPC · JPL
69152	2003 GL_{50}	—	April 4, 2003	Haleakala	NEAT	slow	4.3 km	MPC · JPL
69153	2003 HJ_{22}	—	April 27, 2003	Anderson Mesa	LONEOS	V	1.4 km	MPC · JPL
69154	2003 HZ_{50}	—	April 28, 2003	Kitt Peak	Spacewatch	·	6.0 km	MPC · JPL
69155	2003 HL_{52}	—	April 30, 2003	Haleakala	NEAT	LUT	7.4 km	MPC · JPL
69156	2003 JH_{1}	—	May 1, 2003	Socorro	LINEAR	·	3.2 km	MPC · JPL
69157	2003 JZ_{3}	—	May 3, 2003	Reedy Creek	J. Broughton	BRA	3.5 km	MPC · JPL
69158	2003 JR_{13}	—	May 5, 2003	Anderson Mesa	LONEOS	·	4.8 km	MPC · JPL
69159 Ivanking	2003 JE_{16}	Ivanking	May 7, 2003	Catalina	CSS	·	3.1 km	MPC · JPL
69160	2029 P-L	—	September 24, 1960	Palomar	C. J. van Houten, I. van Houten-Groeneveld, T. Gehrels	NYS	2.4 km	MPC · JPL
69161	2203 P-L	—	September 24, 1960	Palomar	C. J. van Houten, I. van Houten-Groeneveld, T. Gehrels	V	1.5 km	MPC · JPL
69162	2736 P-L	—	September 24, 1960	Palomar	C. J. van Houten, I. van Houten-Groeneveld, T. Gehrels	HOF	4.6 km	MPC · JPL
69163	2744 P-L	—	September 24, 1960	Palomar	C. J. van Houten, I. van Houten-Groeneveld, T. Gehrels	·	5.9 km	MPC · JPL
69164	3031 P-L	—	September 24, 1960	Palomar	C. J. van Houten, I. van Houten-Groeneveld, T. Gehrels	·	7.3 km	MPC · JPL
69165	3044 P-L	—	September 24, 1960	Palomar	C. J. van Houten, I. van Houten-Groeneveld, T. Gehrels	·	1.7 km	MPC · JPL
69166	3075 P-L	—	September 24, 1960	Palomar	C. J. van Houten, I. van Houten-Groeneveld, T. Gehrels	·	2.8 km	MPC · JPL
69167	3082 P-L	—	September 24, 1960	Palomar	C. J. van Houten, I. van Houten-Groeneveld, T. Gehrels	·	4.2 km	MPC · JPL
69168	3515 P-L	—	October 17, 1960	Palomar	C. J. van Houten, I. van Houten-Groeneveld, T. Gehrels	·	6.8 km	MPC · JPL
69169	4066 P-L	—	September 24, 1960	Palomar	C. J. van Houten, I. van Houten-Groeneveld, T. Gehrels	·	3.2 km	MPC · JPL
69170	4199 P-L	—	September 24, 1960	Palomar	C. J. van Houten, I. van Houten-Groeneveld, T. Gehrels	V	1.2 km	MPC · JPL
69171	4230 P-L	—	September 24, 1960	Palomar	C. J. van Houten, I. van Houten-Groeneveld, T. Gehrels	·	4.1 km	MPC · JPL
69172	4283 P-L	—	September 24, 1960	Palomar	C. J. van Houten, I. van Houten-Groeneveld, T. Gehrels	·	5.2 km	MPC · JPL
69173	4304 P-L	—	September 24, 1960	Palomar	C. J. van Houten, I. van Houten-Groeneveld, T. Gehrels	·	2.3 km	MPC · JPL
69174	4514 P-L	—	September 24, 1960	Palomar	C. J. van Houten, I. van Houten-Groeneveld, T. Gehrels	KOR	2.6 km	MPC · JPL
69175	4550 P-L	—	September 24, 1960	Palomar	C. J. van Houten, I. van Houten-Groeneveld, T. Gehrels	·	3.0 km	MPC · JPL
69176	4602 P-L	—	September 24, 1960	Palomar	C. J. van Houten, I. van Houten-Groeneveld, T. Gehrels	·	8.2 km	MPC · JPL
69177	4618 P-L	—	September 24, 1960	Palomar	C. J. van Houten, I. van Houten-Groeneveld, T. Gehrels	NYS	2.2 km	MPC · JPL
69178	4729 P-L	—	September 24, 1960	Palomar	C. J. van Houten, I. van Houten-Groeneveld, T. Gehrels	NYS ·	3.1 km	MPC · JPL
69179	4756 P-L	—	September 24, 1960	Palomar	C. J. van Houten, I. van Houten-Groeneveld, T. Gehrels	·	4.1 km	MPC · JPL
69180	4770 P-L	—	September 24, 1960	Palomar	C. J. van Houten, I. van Houten-Groeneveld, T. Gehrels	·	5.9 km	MPC · JPL
69181	4821 P-L	—	September 24, 1960	Palomar	C. J. van Houten, I. van Houten-Groeneveld, T. Gehrels	(7744)	2.8 km	MPC · JPL
69182	4850 P-L	—	September 24, 1960	Palomar	C. J. van Houten, I. van Houten-Groeneveld, T. Gehrels	EUN	2.5 km	MPC · JPL
69183	6638 P-L	—	September 24, 1960	Palomar	C. J. van Houten, I. van Houten-Groeneveld, T. Gehrels	·	3.0 km	MPC · JPL
69184	6705 P-L	—	September 24, 1960	Palomar	C. J. van Houten, I. van Houten-Groeneveld, T. Gehrels	·	2.9 km	MPC · JPL
69185	6739 P-L	—	September 24, 1960	Palomar	C. J. van Houten, I. van Houten-Groeneveld, T. Gehrels	·	1.5 km	MPC · JPL
69186	6783 P-L	—	September 24, 1960	Palomar	C. J. van Houten, I. van Houten-Groeneveld, T. Gehrels	MRX	2.1 km	MPC · JPL
69187	1178 T-1	—	March 25, 1971	Palomar	C. J. van Houten, I. van Houten-Groeneveld, T. Gehrels	·	4.6 km	MPC · JPL
69188	1258 T-1	—	March 25, 1971	Palomar	C. J. van Houten, I. van Houten-Groeneveld, T. Gehrels	·	1.8 km	MPC · JPL
69189	1263 T-1	—	March 25, 1971	Palomar	C. J. van Houten, I. van Houten-Groeneveld, T. Gehrels	·	5.1 km	MPC · JPL
69190	2027 T-1	—	March 25, 1971	Palomar	C. J. van Houten, I. van Houten-Groeneveld, T. Gehrels	·	9.0 km	MPC · JPL
69191	2143 T-1	—	March 25, 1971	Palomar	C. J. van Houten, I. van Houten-Groeneveld, T. Gehrels	NYS	2.5 km	MPC · JPL
69192	3172 T-1	—	March 26, 1971	Palomar	C. J. van Houten, I. van Houten-Groeneveld, T. Gehrels	·	5.6 km	MPC · JPL
69193	3326 T-1	—	March 26, 1971	Palomar	C. J. van Houten, I. van Houten-Groeneveld, T. Gehrels	·	1.4 km	MPC · JPL
69194	1118 T-2	—	September 29, 1973	Palomar	C. J. van Houten, I. van Houten-Groeneveld, T. Gehrels	·	3.4 km	MPC · JPL
69195	1164 T-2	—	September 29, 1973	Palomar	C. J. van Houten, I. van Houten-Groeneveld, T. Gehrels	·	3.6 km	MPC · JPL
69196	1216 T-2	—	September 29, 1973	Palomar	C. J. van Houten, I. van Houten-Groeneveld, T. Gehrels	·	1.2 km	MPC · JPL
69197	1238 T-2	—	September 29, 1973	Palomar	C. J. van Houten, I. van Houten-Groeneveld, T. Gehrels	THM	6.5 km	MPC · JPL
69198	1255 T-2	—	September 29, 1973	Palomar	C. J. van Houten, I. van Houten-Groeneveld, T. Gehrels	NYS	2.0 km	MPC · JPL
69199	1278 T-2	—	September 29, 1973	Palomar	C. J. van Houten, I. van Houten-Groeneveld, T. Gehrels	EOS	5.3 km	MPC · JPL
69200	1300 T-2	—	September 29, 1973	Palomar	C. J. van Houten, I. van Houten-Groeneveld, T. Gehrels	NYS	1.8 km	MPC · JPL

== 69201–69300 ==
back to top

Designation			Discovery			Properties		Ref
Permanent	Provisional	Named after	Date	Site	Discoverer(s)	Category	Diam.	Ref
69201	1323 T-2	—	September 29, 1973	Palomar	C. J. van Houten, I. van Houten-Groeneveld, T. Gehrels	·	2.5 km	MPC · JPL
69202	2026 T-2	—	September 29, 1973	Palomar	C. J. van Houten, I. van Houten-Groeneveld, T. Gehrels	·	1.8 km	MPC · JPL
69203	2088 T-2	—	September 29, 1973	Palomar	C. J. van Houten, I. van Houten-Groeneveld, T. Gehrels	·	2.2 km	MPC · JPL
69204	2139 T-2	—	September 29, 1973	Palomar	C. J. van Houten, I. van Houten-Groeneveld, T. Gehrels	·	3.1 km	MPC · JPL
69205	2156 T-2	—	September 29, 1973	Palomar	C. J. van Houten, I. van Houten-Groeneveld, T. Gehrels	·	2.9 km	MPC · JPL
69206	2167 T-2	—	September 29, 1973	Palomar	C. J. van Houten, I. van Houten-Groeneveld, T. Gehrels	·	1.4 km	MPC · JPL
69207	3004 T-2	—	September 30, 1973	Palomar	C. J. van Houten, I. van Houten-Groeneveld, T. Gehrels	MAS	1.6 km	MPC · JPL
69208	3078 T-2	—	September 30, 1973	Palomar	C. J. van Houten, I. van Houten-Groeneveld, T. Gehrels	·	2.9 km	MPC · JPL
69209	3300 T-2	—	September 30, 1973	Palomar	C. J. van Houten, I. van Houten-Groeneveld, T. Gehrels	V	1.8 km	MPC · JPL
69210	3356 T-2	—	September 25, 1973	Palomar	C. J. van Houten, I. van Houten-Groeneveld, T. Gehrels	·	4.4 km	MPC · JPL
69211	4098 T-2	—	September 29, 1973	Palomar	C. J. van Houten, I. van Houten-Groeneveld, T. Gehrels	·	1.4 km	MPC · JPL
69212	4287 T-2	—	September 29, 1973	Palomar	C. J. van Houten, I. van Houten-Groeneveld, T. Gehrels	·	1.7 km	MPC · JPL
69213	4616 T-2	—	September 30, 1973	Palomar	C. J. van Houten, I. van Houten-Groeneveld, T. Gehrels	·	4.5 km	MPC · JPL
69214	5067 T-2	—	September 25, 1973	Palomar	C. J. van Houten, I. van Houten-Groeneveld, T. Gehrels	·	7.9 km	MPC · JPL
69215	5099 T-2	—	September 25, 1973	Palomar	C. J. van Houten, I. van Houten-Groeneveld, T. Gehrels	·	3.0 km	MPC · JPL
69216	1108 T-3	—	October 17, 1977	Palomar	C. J. van Houten, I. van Houten-Groeneveld, T. Gehrels	·	7.2 km	MPC · JPL
69217	2135 T-3	—	October 16, 1977	Palomar	C. J. van Houten, I. van Houten-Groeneveld, T. Gehrels	·	7.0 km	MPC · JPL
69218	2330 T-3	—	October 16, 1977	Palomar	C. J. van Houten, I. van Houten-Groeneveld, T. Gehrels	NYS	3.2 km	MPC · JPL
69219	2364 T-3	—	October 16, 1977	Palomar	C. J. van Houten, I. van Houten-Groeneveld, T. Gehrels	GEF	2.5 km	MPC · JPL
69220	3030 T-3	—	October 16, 1977	Palomar	C. J. van Houten, I. van Houten-Groeneveld, T. Gehrels	·	5.7 km	MPC · JPL
69221	3528 T-3	—	October 16, 1977	Palomar	C. J. van Houten, I. van Houten-Groeneveld, T. Gehrels	·	4.1 km	MPC · JPL
69222	4210 T-3	—	October 16, 1977	Palomar	C. J. van Houten, I. van Houten-Groeneveld, T. Gehrels	CYB	11 km	MPC · JPL
69223	4331 T-3	—	October 16, 1977	Palomar	C. J. van Houten, I. van Houten-Groeneveld, T. Gehrels	·	3.7 km	MPC · JPL
69224	4388 T-3	—	October 16, 1977	Palomar	C. J. van Houten, I. van Houten-Groeneveld, T. Gehrels	·	3.7 km	MPC · JPL
69225	5043 T-3	—	October 16, 1977	Palomar	C. J. van Houten, I. van Houten-Groeneveld, T. Gehrels	·	7.7 km	MPC · JPL
69226	5129 T-3	—	October 16, 1977	Palomar	C. J. van Houten, I. van Houten-Groeneveld, T. Gehrels	·	2.3 km	MPC · JPL
69227	5139 T-3	—	October 16, 1977	Palomar	C. J. van Houten, I. van Houten-Groeneveld, T. Gehrels	·	3.1 km	MPC · JPL
69228 Kamerunberg	5173 T-3	Kamerunberg	October 16, 1977	Palomar	C. J. van Houten, I. van Houten-Groeneveld, T. Gehrels	H	1.1 km	MPC · JPL
69229	5188 T-3	—	October 16, 1977	Palomar	C. J. van Houten, I. van Houten-Groeneveld, T. Gehrels	·	3.1 km	MPC · JPL
69230 Hermes	1937 UB	Hermes	October 28, 1937	Heidelberg	K. Reinmuth	APO +1km · PHA · moon	1.0 km	MPC · JPL
69231 Alettajacobs	1972 FE	Alettajacobs	March 16, 1972	Palomar	T. Gehrels	·	3.6 km	MPC · JPL
69232	1978 UJ_{4}	—	October 27, 1978	Palomar	C. M. Olmstead	·	2.0 km	MPC · JPL
69233	1978 UL_{6}	—	October 27, 1978	Palomar	C. M. Olmstead	NYS	3.1 km	MPC · JPL
69234	1978 VO_{2}	—	November 1, 1978	Caussols	K. Tomita	·	7.5 km	MPC · JPL
69235	1978 VS_{3}	—	November 7, 1978	Palomar	E. F. Helin, S. J. Bus	·	2.4 km	MPC · JPL
69236	1978 VF_{5}	—	November 6, 1978	Palomar	E. F. Helin, S. J. Bus	V	1.8 km	MPC · JPL
69237	1978 VR_{6}	—	November 7, 1978	Palomar	E. F. Helin, S. J. Bus	·	3.4 km	MPC · JPL
69238	1978 VZ_{8}	—	November 7, 1978	Palomar	E. F. Helin, S. J. Bus	·	3.1 km	MPC · JPL
69239 Johnstarling	1978 XT	Johnstarling	December 6, 1978	Palomar	E. Bowell, Warnock, A.	·	1.6 km	MPC · JPL
69240	1979 MZ_{1}	—	June 25, 1979	Siding Spring	E. F. Helin, S. J. Bus	·	5.6 km	MPC · JPL
69241	1979 MX_{3}	—	June 25, 1979	Siding Spring	E. F. Helin, S. J. Bus	·	1.3 km	MPC · JPL
69242	1979 MA_{7}	—	June 25, 1979	Siding Spring	E. F. Helin, S. J. Bus	HOF	6.4 km	MPC · JPL
69243	1979 MU_{7}	—	June 25, 1979	Siding Spring	E. F. Helin, S. J. Bus	·	1.4 km	MPC · JPL
69244	1979 MP_{8}	—	June 25, 1979	Siding Spring	E. F. Helin, S. J. Bus	·	2.2 km	MPC · JPL
69245 Persiceto	1981 EO	Persiceto	March 1, 1981	La Silla	G. de Sanctis, H. Debehogne	·	7.9 km	MPC · JPL
69246	1981 EZ_{4}	—	March 2, 1981	Siding Spring	S. J. Bus	·	2.5 km	MPC · JPL
69247	1981 ED_{10}	—	March 1, 1981	Siding Spring	S. J. Bus	·	1.5 km	MPC · JPL
69248	1981 EA_{19}	—	March 2, 1981	Siding Spring	S. J. Bus	·	3.6 km	MPC · JPL
69249	1981 EH_{27}	—	March 2, 1981	Siding Spring	S. J. Bus	EUN	3.7 km	MPC · JPL
69250	1981 EK_{32}	—	March 7, 1981	Siding Spring	S. J. Bus	·	2.0 km	MPC · JPL
69251	1981 ER_{33}	—	March 1, 1981	Siding Spring	S. J. Bus	(2076)	1.3 km	MPC · JPL
69252	1981 EC_{35}	—	March 2, 1981	Siding Spring	S. J. Bus	(2076)	2.0 km	MPC · JPL
69253	1981 EX_{35}	—	March 2, 1981	Siding Spring	S. J. Bus	V	1.2 km	MPC · JPL
69254	1981 EW_{37}	—	March 1, 1981	Siding Spring	S. J. Bus	·	2.1 km	MPC · JPL
69255	1981 ER_{40}	—	March 2, 1981	Siding Spring	S. J. Bus	·	2.4 km	MPC · JPL
69256	1981 EF_{46}	—	March 2, 1981	Siding Spring	S. J. Bus	·	1.6 km	MPC · JPL
69257	1981 ER_{47}	—	March 2, 1981	Siding Spring	S. J. Bus	·	4.4 km	MPC · JPL
69258	1981 UJ_{22}	—	October 24, 1981	Palomar	S. J. Bus	·	4.8 km	MPC · JPL
69259 Savostyanov	1982 ST_{7}	Savostyanov	September 18, 1982	Nauchnyj	N. S. Chernykh	·	3.0 km	MPC · JPL
69260 Tonyjudt	1982 TJ	Tonyjudt	October 13, 1982	Anderson Mesa	E. Bowell	·	3.5 km	MPC · JPL
69261 Philaret	1982 YM_{1}	Philaret	December 23, 1982	Nauchnyj	L. G. Karachkina	·	7.1 km	MPC · JPL
69262	1986 PV_{6}	—	August 12, 1986	Nauchnyj	L. V. Zhuravleva	·	2.8 km	MPC · JPL
69263 Big Ben	1987 BB_{2}	Big Ben	January 29, 1987	La Silla	E. W. Elst	·	2.3 km	MPC · JPL
69264 Nebra	1988 PE_{4}	Nebra	August 14, 1988	Tautenburg Observatory	F. Börngen	NYS	2.7 km	MPC · JPL
69265	1988 RF_{6}	—	September 5, 1988	La Silla	H. Debehogne	MAS	1.6 km	MPC · JPL
69266	1988 RJ_{6}	—	September 6, 1988	La Silla	H. Debehogne	ERI	5.9 km	MPC · JPL
69267	1988 RO_{6}	—	September 7, 1988	La Silla	H. Debehogne	V	3.3 km	MPC · JPL
69268	1988 SD_{2}	—	September 16, 1988	Cerro Tololo	S. J. Bus	·	2.8 km	MPC · JPL
69269	1988 VA_{1}	—	November 3, 1988	Brorfelde	P. Jensen	·	4.3 km	MPC · JPL
69270	1989 BB	—	January 29, 1989	Kitami	K. Endate, K. Watanabe	·	6.0 km	MPC · JPL
69271	1989 GK_{2}	—	April 3, 1989	La Silla	E. W. Elst	·	3.6 km	MPC · JPL
69272	1989 SC_{2}	—	September 26, 1989	La Silla	E. W. Elst	PHO	2.1 km	MPC · JPL
69273 Derbyastro	1989 TN_{1}	Derbyastro	October 4, 1989	Stakenbridge	B. G. W. Manning	·	4.6 km	MPC · JPL
69274	1989 UZ_{1}	—	October 29, 1989	Gekko	Y. Oshima	·	2.2 km	MPC · JPL
69275 Wiesenthal	1989 WD_{4}	Wiesenthal	November 28, 1989	Tautenburg Observatory	F. Börngen	DOR	5.9 km	MPC · JPL
69276	1989 YH_{8}	—	December 31, 1989	Haute Provence	E. W. Elst	·	2.9 km	MPC · JPL
69277	1990 EC_{1}	—	March 2, 1990	La Silla	E. W. Elst	·	2.2 km	MPC · JPL
69278	1990 EK_{2}	—	March 2, 1990	La Silla	E. W. Elst	·	3.9 km	MPC · JPL
69279	1990 ES_{2}	—	March 2, 1990	La Silla	E. W. Elst	·	3.0 km	MPC · JPL
69280	1990 RB_{7}	—	September 13, 1990	La Silla	H. Debehogne	·	3.8 km	MPC · JPL
69281	1990 SG_{6}	—	September 22, 1990	La Silla	E. W. Elst	(5)	3.1 km	MPC · JPL
69282	1990 SV_{6}	—	September 22, 1990	La Silla	E. W. Elst	MAR	5.0 km	MPC · JPL
69283	1990 ST_{7}	—	September 22, 1990	La Silla	E. W. Elst	·	4.2 km	MPC · JPL
69284	1990 SB_{9}	—	September 22, 1990	La Silla	E. W. Elst	·	1.6 km	MPC · JPL
69285	1990 ST_{14}	—	September 25, 1990	La Silla	H. Debehogne	·	3.7 km	MPC · JPL
69286 von Liebig	1990 TN_{9}	von Liebig	October 10, 1990	Tautenburg Observatory	F. Börngen, L. D. Schmadel	·	3.1 km	MPC · JPL
69287 Günthereichhorn	1990 TW_{10}	Günthereichhorn	October 10, 1990	Tautenburg Observatory	L. D. Schmadel, F. Börngen	·	1.2 km	MPC · JPL
69288 Berlioz	1990 TW_{11}	Berlioz	October 11, 1990	Tautenburg Observatory	F. Börngen, L. D. Schmadel	·	6.3 km	MPC · JPL
69289	1990 UU_{2}	—	October 24, 1990	Kitt Peak	Spacewatch	·	1.4 km	MPC · JPL
69290	1990 UQ_{4}	—	October 16, 1990	La Silla	E. W. Elst	·	1.7 km	MPC · JPL
69291	1990 WG_{1}	—	November 18, 1990	La Silla	E. W. Elst	HNS	4.3 km	MPC · JPL
69292	1990 WH_{2}	—	November 18, 1990	La Silla	E. W. Elst	EUN	4.0 km	MPC · JPL
69293	1991 GW_{10}	—	April 10, 1991	La Silla	E. W. Elst	·	4.1 km	MPC · JPL
69294	1991 PU_{9}	—	August 13, 1991	Palomar	E. F. Helin	T_{j} (2.98)	16 km	MPC · JPL
69295 Stecklum	1991 TO_{6}	Stecklum	October 2, 1991	Tautenburg Observatory	L. D. Schmadel, F. Börngen	·	8.3 km	MPC · JPL
69296	1992 BM_{4}	—	January 29, 1992	Kitt Peak	Spacewatch	·	3.3 km	MPC · JPL
69297	1992 DT_{8}	—	February 29, 1992	La Silla	UESAC	·	5.1 km	MPC · JPL
69298	1992 DR_{9}	—	February 29, 1992	La Silla	UESAC	·	4.0 km	MPC · JPL
69299	1992 EW_{6}	—	March 1, 1992	La Silla	UESAC	ADE	5.5 km	MPC · JPL
69300	1992 EH_{7}	—	March 1, 1992	La Silla	UESAC	·	3.9 km	MPC · JPL

== 69301–69400 ==
back to top

Designation			Discovery			Properties		Ref
Permanent	Provisional	Named after	Date	Site	Discoverer(s)	Category	Diam.	Ref
69301	1992 ES_{8}	—	March 2, 1992	La Silla	UESAC	·	5.8 km	MPC · JPL
69302	1992 EZ_{10}	—	March 6, 1992	La Silla	UESAC	3:2	12 km	MPC · JPL
69303	1992 EM_{13}	—	March 2, 1992	La Silla	UESAC	·	5.6 km	MPC · JPL
69304	1992 EA_{14}	—	March 2, 1992	La Silla	UESAC	·	1.9 km	MPC · JPL
69305	1992 EJ_{14}	—	March 2, 1992	La Silla	UESAC	·	3.0 km	MPC · JPL
69306	1992 EN_{29}	—	March 3, 1992	La Silla	UESAC	MRX	2.1 km	MPC · JPL
69307	1992 ON	—	July 28, 1992	Siding Spring	R. H. McNaught	H	1.3 km	MPC · JPL
69308	1992 PK_{1}	—	August 8, 1992	Caussols	E. W. Elst	·	2.5 km	MPC · JPL
69309	1992 PL_{1}	—	August 8, 1992	Caussols	E. W. Elst	·	1.3 km	MPC · JPL
69310	1992 PQ_{1}	—	August 8, 1992	Caussols	E. W. Elst	(2076)	1.9 km	MPC · JPL
69311 Russ	1992 QC	Russ	August 21, 1992	Siding Spring	D. I. Steel	·	4.3 km	MPC · JPL
69312 Rogerbacon	1992 SH_{17}	Rogerbacon	September 24, 1992	Tautenburg Observatory	F. Börngen, L. D. Schmadel	V	1.9 km	MPC · JPL
69313	1992 SW_{18}	—	September 22, 1992	La Silla	E. W. Elst	·	2.2 km	MPC · JPL
69314	1992 SW_{21}	—	September 22, 1992	La Silla	E. W. Elst	V	1.8 km	MPC · JPL
69315	1992 UR_{2}	—	October 20, 1992	Palomar	H. E. Holt	PHO · slow	4.5 km	MPC · JPL
69316	1993 FP_{8}	—	March 17, 1993	La Silla	UESAC	·	2.5 km	MPC · JPL
69317	1993 FB_{20}	—	March 17, 1993	La Silla	UESAC	slow	3.2 km	MPC · JPL
69318	1993 FQ_{20}	—	March 19, 1993	La Silla	UESAC	·	3.7 km	MPC · JPL
69319	1993 FA_{29}	—	March 21, 1993	La Silla	UESAC	EUN	3.1 km	MPC · JPL
69320	1993 FJ_{30}	—	March 21, 1993	La Silla	UESAC	·	4.1 km	MPC · JPL
69321	1993 FH_{34}	—	March 19, 1993	La Silla	UESAC	·	3.4 km	MPC · JPL
69322	1993 FX_{41}	—	March 19, 1993	La Silla	UESAC	·	4.2 km	MPC · JPL
69323	1993 FZ_{41}	—	March 19, 1993	La Silla	UESAC	EUN	4.4 km	MPC · JPL
69324	1993 FY_{46}	—	March 19, 1993	La Silla	UESAC	fast	2.8 km	MPC · JPL
69325	1993 FP_{48}	—	March 19, 1993	La Silla	UESAC	·	2.3 km	MPC · JPL
69326	1993 FU_{49}	—	March 19, 1993	La Silla	UESAC	(5)	3.7 km	MPC · JPL
69327	1993 FJ_{60}	—	March 19, 1993	La Silla	UESAC	·	2.6 km	MPC · JPL
69328	1993 FY_{80}	—	March 18, 1993	La Silla	UESAC	·	2.7 km	MPC · JPL
69329	1993 GH_{1}	—	April 15, 1993	Palomar	H. E. Holt	·	4.4 km	MPC · JPL
69330	1993 HO_{2}	—	April 19, 1993	Kitt Peak	Spacewatch	·	2.4 km	MPC · JPL
69331	1993 LE_{1}	—	June 13, 1993	Siding Spring	R. H. McNaught	EUN	3.5 km	MPC · JPL
69332	1993 LJ_{1}	—	June 13, 1993	Siding Spring	R. H. McNaught	JUN	3.8 km	MPC · JPL
69333	1993 OU_{8}	—	July 20, 1993	La Silla	E. W. Elst	·	6.6 km	MPC · JPL
69334	1993 PT_{1}	—	August 14, 1993	Kitt Peak	Spacewatch	NYS	1.2 km	MPC · JPL
69335	1993 RT_{6}	—	September 15, 1993	La Silla	E. W. Elst	KOR	2.8 km	MPC · JPL
69336	1993 SJ	—	September 16, 1993	Kitt Peak	Spacewatch	·	1.1 km	MPC · JPL
69337	1993 SQ_{5}	—	September 17, 1993	La Silla	E. W. Elst	·	2.0 km	MPC · JPL
69338	1993 TM_{6}	—	October 9, 1993	Kitt Peak	Spacewatch	·	4.1 km	MPC · JPL
69339	1993 TF_{11}	—	October 15, 1993	Kitt Peak	Spacewatch	·	1.6 km	MPC · JPL
69340	1993 TA_{15}	—	October 9, 1993	La Silla	E. W. Elst	·	1.8 km	MPC · JPL
69341	1993 TD_{18}	—	October 9, 1993	La Silla	E. W. Elst	·	4.4 km	MPC · JPL
69342	1993 TT_{19}	—	October 9, 1993	La Silla	E. W. Elst	·	4.0 km	MPC · JPL
69343	1993 TO_{29}	—	October 9, 1993	La Silla	E. W. Elst	·	1.4 km	MPC · JPL
69344	1993 TH_{30}	—	October 9, 1993	La Silla	E. W. Elst	·	1.7 km	MPC · JPL
69345	1993 TE_{31}	—	October 9, 1993	La Silla	E. W. Elst	·	1.3 km	MPC · JPL
69346	1993 TV_{32}	—	October 9, 1993	La Silla	E. W. Elst	·	1.4 km	MPC · JPL
69347	1993 TM_{41}	—	October 9, 1993	La Silla	E. W. Elst	·	5.7 km	MPC · JPL
69348	1993 UH_{8}	—	October 20, 1993	La Silla	E. W. Elst	·	1.4 km	MPC · JPL
69349	1993 VU	—	November 9, 1993	Palomar	E. F. Helin	PHO	2.2 km	MPC · JPL
69350	1993 YP	—	December 17, 1993	Siding Spring	G. J. Garradd	H	1.8 km	MPC · JPL
69351	1994 AE_{3}	—	January 15, 1994	Stroncone	A. Vagnozzi	NYS ·	3.3 km	MPC · JPL
69352	1994 AR_{5}	—	January 5, 1994	Kitt Peak	Spacewatch	·	2.0 km	MPC · JPL
69353	1994 AE_{9}	—	January 8, 1994	Kitt Peak	Spacewatch	NYS	2.8 km	MPC · JPL
69354	1994 CZ_{2}	—	February 10, 1994	Kitt Peak	Spacewatch	·	3.8 km	MPC · JPL
69355	1994 CM_{12}	—	February 7, 1994	La Silla	E. W. Elst	·	1.9 km	MPC · JPL
69356	1994 CA_{17}	—	February 8, 1994	La Silla	E. W. Elst	·	4.5 km	MPC · JPL
69357	1994 FU	—	March 21, 1994	Siding Spring	G. J. Garradd	PHO	5.0 km	MPC · JPL
69358	1994 PC_{9}	—	August 10, 1994	La Silla	E. W. Elst	·	6.8 km	MPC · JPL
69359	1994 PH_{10}	—	August 10, 1994	La Silla	E. W. Elst	PAD	3.6 km	MPC · JPL
69360	1994 PJ_{12}	—	August 10, 1994	La Silla	E. W. Elst	·	3.2 km	MPC · JPL
69361	1994 PA_{13}	—	August 10, 1994	La Silla	E. W. Elst	(17392)	2.8 km	MPC · JPL
69362	1994 PX_{13}	—	August 10, 1994	La Silla	E. W. Elst	·	3.6 km	MPC · JPL
69363	1994 PK_{14}	—	August 10, 1994	La Silla	E. W. Elst	·	3.6 km	MPC · JPL
69364	1994 PU_{30}	—	August 12, 1994	La Silla	E. W. Elst	·	3.1 km	MPC · JPL
69365	1994 QF	—	August 26, 1994	Farra d'Isonzo	Farra d'Isonzo	·	4.1 km	MPC · JPL
69366	1994 RF_{6}	—	September 12, 1994	Kitt Peak	Spacewatch	·	3.6 km	MPC · JPL
69367	1994 SD	—	September 30, 1994	Farra d'Isonzo	Farra d'Isonzo	·	3.4 km	MPC · JPL
69368	1994 SE_{8}	—	September 28, 1994	Kitt Peak	Spacewatch	·	2.5 km	MPC · JPL
69369	1994 SP_{9}	—	September 28, 1994	Kitt Peak	Spacewatch	(18466)	4.5 km	MPC · JPL
69370	1994 SF_{11}	—	September 29, 1994	Kitt Peak	Spacewatch	·	2.8 km	MPC · JPL
69371	1994 TA_{1}	—	October 2, 1994	Kitami	K. Endate, K. Watanabe	·	7.4 km	MPC · JPL
69372	1994 UA_{6}	—	October 28, 1994	Kitt Peak	Spacewatch	DOR	6.3 km	MPC · JPL
69373	1994 UL_{6}	—	October 28, 1994	Kitt Peak	Spacewatch	AGN	2.4 km	MPC · JPL
69374	1994 UH_{7}	—	October 28, 1994	Kitt Peak	Spacewatch	·	5.3 km	MPC · JPL
69375	1994 VG_{1}	—	November 4, 1994	Oizumi	T. Kobayashi	GEF	2.6 km	MPC · JPL
69376	1994 WR_{1}	—	November 27, 1994	Oizumi	T. Kobayashi	GEF	3.5 km	MPC · JPL
69377	1994 WJ_{3}	—	November 28, 1994	Kushiro	S. Ueda, H. Kaneda	·	3.9 km	MPC · JPL
69378	1994 WA_{8}	—	November 28, 1994	Kitt Peak	Spacewatch	DOR	5.1 km	MPC · JPL
69379	1994 WC_{13}	—	November 28, 1994	Kitt Peak	Spacewatch	·	3.3 km	MPC · JPL
69380	1994 YK_{2}	—	December 31, 1994	Oizumi	T. Kobayashi	·	8.8 km	MPC · JPL
69381	1995 BH	—	January 23, 1995	Oizumi	T. Kobayashi	·	4.2 km	MPC · JPL
69382	1995 BQ_{8}	—	January 29, 1995	Kitt Peak	Spacewatch	·	6.5 km	MPC · JPL
69383	1995 BK_{13}	—	January 31, 1995	Kitt Peak	Spacewatch	·	1.6 km	MPC · JPL
69384	1995 CQ_{3}	—	February 1, 1995	Kitt Peak	Spacewatch	·	4.3 km	MPC · JPL
69385	1995 DH_{6}	—	February 24, 1995	Kitt Peak	Spacewatch	·	1.7 km	MPC · JPL
69386	1995 DL_{6}	—	February 24, 1995	Kitt Peak	Spacewatch	·	1.7 km	MPC · JPL
69387	1995 DN_{7}	—	February 24, 1995	Kitt Peak	Spacewatch	·	7.8 km	MPC · JPL
69388	1995 ER_{5}	—	March 2, 1995	Kitt Peak	Spacewatch	EOS	4.1 km	MPC · JPL
69389	1995 FD_{4}	—	March 23, 1995	Kitt Peak	Spacewatch	·	1.6 km	MPC · JPL
69390	1995 FH_{5}	—	March 23, 1995	Kitt Peak	Spacewatch	PHO	1.8 km	MPC · JPL
69391	1995 FF_{6}	—	March 23, 1995	Kitt Peak	Spacewatch	·	6.4 km	MPC · JPL
69392	1995 FV_{7}	—	March 25, 1995	Kitt Peak	Spacewatch	·	1.6 km	MPC · JPL
69393	1995 FY_{7}	—	March 25, 1995	Kitt Peak	Spacewatch	·	2.1 km	MPC · JPL
69394	1995 FA_{8}	—	March 25, 1995	Kitt Peak	Spacewatch	·	5.2 km	MPC · JPL
69395	1995 FO_{12}	—	March 27, 1995	Kitt Peak	Spacewatch	·	6.3 km	MPC · JPL
69396	1995 FN_{17}	—	March 28, 1995	Kitt Peak	Spacewatch	·	1.5 km	MPC · JPL
69397	1995 FO_{17}	—	March 28, 1995	Kitt Peak	Spacewatch	·	1.5 km	MPC · JPL
69398	1995 FH_{19}	—	March 29, 1995	Kitt Peak	Spacewatch	·	5.6 km	MPC · JPL
69399	1995 GD_{4}	—	April 4, 1995	Kitt Peak	Spacewatch	VER	7.3 km	MPC · JPL
69400	1995 OO_{2}	—	July 22, 1995	Kitt Peak	Spacewatch	·	2.2 km	MPC · JPL

== 69401–69500 ==
back to top

Designation			Discovery			Properties		Ref
Permanent	Provisional	Named after	Date	Site	Discoverer(s)	Category	Diam.	Ref
69401	1995 QV_{3}	—	August 26, 1995	Siding Spring	R. H. McNaught	·	4.3 km	MPC · JPL
69402	1995 SM_{10}	—	September 17, 1995	Kitt Peak	Spacewatch	·	1.7 km	MPC · JPL
69403	1995 SR_{13}	—	September 18, 1995	Kitt Peak	Spacewatch	·	2.6 km	MPC · JPL
69404	1995 SS_{30}	—	September 20, 1995	Kitt Peak	Spacewatch	·	4.0 km	MPC · JPL
69405	1995 SW_{48}	—	September 30, 1995	Catalina Station	T. B. Spahr	H	2.4 km	MPC · JPL
69406 Martz-Kohl	1995 SX_{48}	Martz-Kohl	September 30, 1995	Catalina Station	C. W. Hergenrother	H · moon	3.2 km	MPC · JPL
69407	1995 SZ_{83}	—	September 24, 1995	Kitt Peak	Spacewatch	·	2.1 km	MPC · JPL
69408	1995 TT_{8}	—	October 1, 1995	Kitt Peak	Spacewatch	·	1.4 km	MPC · JPL
69409	1995 UQ	—	October 19, 1995	Dossobuono	Lai, L.	·	1.9 km	MPC · JPL
69410	1995 UB_{3}	—	October 23, 1995	Catalina Station	T. B. Spahr	H	1.4 km	MPC · JPL
69411	1995 UR_{8}	—	October 21, 1995	Chichibu	N. Satō, T. Urata	·	2.1 km	MPC · JPL
69412	1995 UJ_{37}	—	October 21, 1995	Kitt Peak	Spacewatch	·	2.4 km	MPC · JPL
69413	1995 VA	—	November 1, 1995	Oizumi	T. Kobayashi	MAR	2.4 km	MPC · JPL
69414	1995 VY_{11}	—	November 15, 1995	Kitt Peak	Spacewatch	·	2.4 km	MPC · JPL
69415	1995 WA_{13}	—	November 16, 1995	Kitt Peak	Spacewatch	·	2.2 km	MPC · JPL
69416	1995 WX_{16}	—	November 17, 1995	Kitt Peak	Spacewatch	·	4.0 km	MPC · JPL
69417	1995 WV_{35}	—	November 21, 1995	Kitt Peak	Spacewatch	3:2	9.2 km	MPC · JPL
69418	1995 WX_{42}	—	November 25, 1995	Kushiro	S. Ueda, H. Kaneda	EUN	4.3 km	MPC · JPL
69419	1995 XH_{3}	—	December 14, 1995	Kitt Peak	Spacewatch	·	3.8 km	MPC · JPL
69420	1995 YA_{1}	—	December 21, 1995	Oizumi	T. Kobayashi	slow	6.4 km	MPC · JPL
69421 Keizosaji	1995 YT_{2}	Keizosaji	December 22, 1995	Saji	Saji	·	2.1 km	MPC · JPL
69422	1995 YO_{7}	—	December 16, 1995	Kitt Peak	Spacewatch	EUN	3.5 km	MPC · JPL
69423 Openuni	1996 AA_{2}	Openuni	January 15, 1996	Farra d'Isonzo	Farra d'Isonzo	·	3.3 km	MPC · JPL
69424	1996 AG_{6}	—	January 12, 1996	Kitt Peak	Spacewatch	·	5.7 km	MPC · JPL
69425	1996 BC	—	January 16, 1996	Stroncone	A. Vagnozzi	·	3.5 km	MPC · JPL
69426	1996 BW_{6}	—	January 19, 1996	Kitt Peak	Spacewatch	·	3.8 km	MPC · JPL
69427	1996 BJ_{10}	—	January 21, 1996	Kitt Peak	Spacewatch	·	3.8 km	MPC · JPL
69428	1996 EA_{3}	—	March 9, 1996	Xinglong	SCAP	·	4.5 km	MPC · JPL
69429	1996 EB_{8}	—	March 11, 1996	Kitt Peak	Spacewatch	·	7.3 km	MPC · JPL
69430	1996 GA_{1}	—	April 15, 1996	Prescott	P. G. Comba	·	5.3 km	MPC · JPL
69431	1996 GG_{8}	—	April 12, 1996	Kitt Peak	Spacewatch	·	5.1 km	MPC · JPL
69432	1996 HC_{18}	—	April 18, 1996	La Silla	E. W. Elst	·	6.1 km	MPC · JPL
69433	1996 HY_{18}	—	April 18, 1996	La Silla	E. W. Elst	·	4.3 km	MPC · JPL
69434 de Gerlache	1996 HC_{21}	de Gerlache	April 18, 1996	La Silla	E. W. Elst	·	11 km	MPC · JPL
69435	1996 HH_{21}	—	April 18, 1996	La Silla	E. W. Elst	THM	6.0 km	MPC · JPL
69436	1996 JT_{7}	—	May 12, 1996	Kitt Peak	Spacewatch	·	6.3 km	MPC · JPL
69437	1996 KW_{2}	—	May 21, 1996	Xinglong	SCAP	L5	21 km	MPC · JPL
69438	1996 LU_{2}	—	June 11, 1996	Kitt Peak	Spacewatch	EOS	3.3 km	MPC · JPL
69439	1996 PX	—	August 9, 1996	Haleakala	NEAT	(883)	2.3 km	MPC · JPL
69440	1996 PV_{2}	—	August 14, 1996	Haleakala	NEAT	PHO	2.3 km	MPC · JPL
69441	1996 PG_{8}	—	August 8, 1996	La Silla	E. W. Elst	·	2.1 km	MPC · JPL
69442	1996 RA_{13}	—	September 8, 1996	Kitt Peak	Spacewatch	·	1.9 km	MPC · JPL
69443	1996 RB_{16}	—	September 13, 1996	Kitt Peak	Spacewatch	·	1.9 km	MPC · JPL
69444	1996 RN_{17}	—	September 13, 1996	Kitt Peak	Spacewatch	·	1.9 km	MPC · JPL
69445	1996 RZ_{20}	—	September 5, 1996	Kitt Peak	Spacewatch	·	2.2 km	MPC · JPL
69446	1996 SL_{4}	—	September 21, 1996	Xinglong	SCAP	·	1.7 km	MPC · JPL
69447	1996 SG_{8}	—	September 21, 1996	Xinglong	SCAP	·	1.3 km	MPC · JPL
69448	1996 TQ	—	October 4, 1996	Farra d'Isonzo	Farra d'Isonzo	NYS	2.4 km	MPC · JPL
69449	1996 TD_{2}	—	October 3, 1996	Xinglong	SCAP	·	2.2 km	MPC · JPL
69450	1996 TL_{3}	—	October 4, 1996	Kleť	Kleť	NYS	1.7 km	MPC · JPL
69451	1996 TD_{5}	—	October 8, 1996	Prescott	P. G. Comba	·	2.1 km	MPC · JPL
69452	1996 TL_{5}	—	October 9, 1996	Haleakala	NEAT	·	2.4 km	MPC · JPL
69453	1996 TG_{11}	—	October 11, 1996	Kitami	K. Endate	·	2.0 km	MPC · JPL
69454	1996 TE_{28}	—	October 7, 1996	Kitt Peak	Spacewatch	·	2.2 km	MPC · JPL
69455	1996 TB_{33}	—	October 10, 1996	Kitt Peak	Spacewatch	·	1.8 km	MPC · JPL
69456	1996 TO_{33}	—	October 10, 1996	Kitt Peak	Spacewatch	·	2.3 km	MPC · JPL
69457	1996 TP_{36}	—	October 12, 1996	Kitt Peak	Spacewatch	·	2.1 km	MPC · JPL
69458	1996 TQ_{54}	—	October 5, 1996	Xinglong	SCAP	·	1.8 km	MPC · JPL
69459	1996 TX_{62}	—	October 6, 1996	La Silla	E. W. Elst	·	1.9 km	MPC · JPL
69460 Christibarnard	1996 UO_{1}	Christibarnard	October 17, 1996	Colleverde	V. S. Casulli	·	2.0 km	MPC · JPL
69461	1996 UA_{3}	—	October 24, 1996	Modra	L. Kornoš, P. Kolény	·	2.3 km	MPC · JPL
69462	1996 UB_{4}	—	October 29, 1996	Xinglong	SCAP	V	1.1 km	MPC · JPL
69463	1996 VZ_{1}	—	November 1, 1996	Xinglong	SCAP	NYS	2.3 km	MPC · JPL
69464	1996 VV_{4}	—	November 13, 1996	Oizumi	T. Kobayashi	·	2.1 km	MPC · JPL
69465	1996 VR_{5}	—	November 14, 1996	Oizumi	T. Kobayashi	NYS	4.4 km	MPC · JPL
69466	1996 VZ_{5}	—	November 15, 1996	Oizumi	T. Kobayashi	·	4.1 km	MPC · JPL
69467	1996 VA_{14}	—	November 5, 1996	Kitt Peak	Spacewatch	·	4.8 km	MPC · JPL
69468	1996 VO_{15}	—	November 5, 1996	Kitt Peak	Spacewatch	MAS	1.6 km	MPC · JPL
69469 Krumbenowe	1996 WR	Krumbenowe	November 16, 1996	Kleť	J. Tichá, M. Tichý	·	1.4 km	MPC · JPL
69470	1996 XH	—	December 1, 1996	Oohira	T. Urata	·	2.6 km	MPC · JPL
69471	1996 XM_{1}	—	December 2, 1996	Oizumi	T. Kobayashi	NYS	3.2 km	MPC · JPL
69472	1996 XN_{1}	—	December 2, 1996	Oizumi	T. Kobayashi	NYS	2.3 km	MPC · JPL
69473	1996 XO_{1}	—	December 2, 1996	Oizumi	T. Kobayashi	V	2.4 km	MPC · JPL
69474	1996 XA_{3}	—	December 3, 1996	Oizumi	T. Kobayashi	·	4.7 km	MPC · JPL
69475	1996 XE_{9}	—	December 6, 1996	Kleť	Kleť	·	2.0 km	MPC · JPL
69476	1996 XF_{10}	—	December 1, 1996	Kitt Peak	Spacewatch	·	1.9 km	MPC · JPL
69477	1996 XS_{13}	—	December 4, 1996	Kitt Peak	Spacewatch	MAS	1.4 km	MPC · JPL
69478	1996 XO_{15}	—	December 10, 1996	Xinglong	SCAP	MAS	1.9 km	MPC · JPL
69479	1996 XH_{16}	—	December 4, 1996	Kitt Peak	Spacewatch	MAS	1.1 km	MPC · JPL
69480	1996 XL_{19}	—	December 8, 1996	Oizumi	T. Kobayashi	MAS	1.4 km	MPC · JPL
69481	1996 XU_{19}	—	December 11, 1996	Oizumi	T. Kobayashi	NYS	4.3 km	MPC · JPL
69482	1996 XC_{26}	—	December 8, 1996	Chichibu	N. Satō	NYS	2.7 km	MPC · JPL
69483	1996 XA_{31}	—	December 14, 1996	Oizumi	T. Kobayashi	·	2.3 km	MPC · JPL
69484	1996 YR_{1}	—	December 18, 1996	Xinglong	SCAP	·	3.5 km	MPC · JPL
69485	1997 AD	—	January 2, 1997	Oizumi	T. Kobayashi	·	4.3 km	MPC · JPL
69486	1997 AM_{1}	—	January 2, 1997	Chichibu	N. Satō	NYS	3.2 km	MPC · JPL
69487	1997 AZ_{2}	—	January 4, 1997	Oizumi	T. Kobayashi	·	4.2 km	MPC · JPL
69488	1997 AV_{3}	—	January 3, 1997	Oohira	T. Urata	·	4.4 km	MPC · JPL
69489	1997 AB_{4}	—	January 6, 1997	Oizumi	T. Kobayashi	·	1.7 km	MPC · JPL
69490	1997 AE_{5}	—	January 3, 1997	Chichibu	N. Satō	PHO	3.3 km	MPC · JPL
69491	1997 AZ_{5}	—	January 2, 1997	Xinglong	SCAP	·	2.5 km	MPC · JPL
69492	1997 AG_{7}	—	January 9, 1997	Oizumi	T. Kobayashi	·	2.0 km	MPC · JPL
69493	1997 AO_{12}	—	January 11, 1997	Prescott	P. G. Comba	PHO	2.4 km	MPC · JPL
69494	1997 AF_{15}	—	January 13, 1997	Oizumi	T. Kobayashi	·	4.8 km	MPC · JPL
69495	1997 AY_{17}	—	January 15, 1997	Oizumi	T. Kobayashi	·	2.5 km	MPC · JPL
69496 Zaoryuzan	1997 AE_{22}	Zaoryuzan	January 13, 1997	Nanyo	T. Okuni	·	2.6 km	MPC · JPL
69497	1997 BK_{2}	—	January 30, 1997	Oizumi	T. Kobayashi	·	2.2 km	MPC · JPL
69498	1997 CM_{1}	—	February 1, 1997	Oizumi	T. Kobayashi	·	6.2 km	MPC · JPL
69499	1997 CV_{4}	—	February 3, 1997	Haleakala	NEAT	PHO	2.5 km	MPC · JPL
69500 Ginobartali	1997 CB_{6}	Ginobartali	February 6, 1997	Colleverde	V. S. Casulli	NYS	2.2 km	MPC · JPL

== 69501–69600 ==
back to top

Designation			Discovery			Properties		Ref
Permanent	Provisional	Named after	Date	Site	Discoverer(s)	Category	Diam.	Ref
69501	1997 CK_{11}	—	February 3, 1997	Kitt Peak	Spacewatch	·	2.4 km	MPC · JPL
69502	1997 CK_{12}	—	February 3, 1997	Kitt Peak	Spacewatch	NYS	2.1 km	MPC · JPL
69503	1997 CF_{16}	—	February 6, 1997	Kitt Peak	Spacewatch	·	2.1 km	MPC · JPL
69504	1997 CG_{20}	—	February 12, 1997	Oizumi	T. Kobayashi	·	6.0 km	MPC · JPL
69505	1997 CX_{21}	—	February 11, 1997	Oohira	T. Urata	·	4.6 km	MPC · JPL
69506	1997 CF_{26}	—	February 14, 1997	Oizumi	T. Kobayashi	·	4.2 km	MPC · JPL
69507	1997 CQ_{27}	—	February 4, 1997	Xinglong	SCAP	·	2.3 km	MPC · JPL
69508	1997 ET_{2}	—	March 4, 1997	Oizumi	T. Kobayashi	·	3.2 km	MPC · JPL
69509	1997 ES_{4}	—	March 2, 1997	Kitt Peak	Spacewatch	·	2.1 km	MPC · JPL
69510	1997 EN_{5}	—	March 4, 1997	Kitt Peak	Spacewatch	·	3.0 km	MPC · JPL
69511	1997 ER_{33}	—	March 4, 1997	Socorro	LINEAR	NYS	3.0 km	MPC · JPL
69512	1997 EZ_{38}	—	March 5, 1997	Socorro	LINEAR	·	3.0 km	MPC · JPL
69513	1997 EP_{39}	—	March 5, 1997	Socorro	LINEAR	·	3.2 km	MPC · JPL
69514	1997 EQ_{46}	—	March 12, 1997	La Silla	E. W. Elst	·	5.6 km	MPC · JPL
69515	1997 EM_{47}	—	March 12, 1997	La Silla	E. W. Elst	·	3.1 km	MPC · JPL
69516	1997 FJ	—	March 21, 1997	Xinglong	SCAP	·	4.1 km	MPC · JPL
69517	1997 FM_{3}	—	March 31, 1997	Socorro	LINEAR	EUN	2.9 km	MPC · JPL
69518	1997 FS_{4}	—	March 28, 1997	Xinglong	SCAP	BAR	3.9 km	MPC · JPL
69519	1997 GT_{1}	—	April 2, 1997	Kitt Peak	Spacewatch	(5)	2.7 km	MPC · JPL
69520	1997 GC_{2}	—	April 7, 1997	Kitt Peak	Spacewatch	·	2.7 km	MPC · JPL
69521	1997 GY_{2}	—	April 7, 1997	Kitt Peak	Spacewatch	·	3.1 km	MPC · JPL
69522	1997 GY_{6}	—	April 2, 1997	Socorro	LINEAR	·	3.9 km	MPC · JPL
69523	1997 GH_{7}	—	April 2, 1997	Socorro	LINEAR	·	3.8 km	MPC · JPL
69524	1997 GM_{7}	—	April 2, 1997	Socorro	LINEAR	(194)	7.7 km	MPC · JPL
69525	1997 GF_{9}	—	April 3, 1997	Socorro	LINEAR	EUN	2.7 km	MPC · JPL
69526	1997 GN_{9}	—	April 3, 1997	Socorro	LINEAR	·	2.7 km	MPC · JPL
69527	1997 GU_{10}	—	April 3, 1997	Socorro	LINEAR	·	1.7 km	MPC · JPL
69528	1997 GV_{10}	—	April 3, 1997	Socorro	LINEAR	·	2.4 km	MPC · JPL
69529	1997 GU_{12}	—	April 3, 1997	Socorro	LINEAR	·	1.9 km	MPC · JPL
69530	1997 GN_{13}	—	April 3, 1997	Socorro	LINEAR	·	2.0 km	MPC · JPL
69531	1997 GV_{13}	—	April 3, 1997	Socorro	LINEAR	·	2.0 km	MPC · JPL
69532	1997 GC_{17}	—	April 3, 1997	Socorro	LINEAR	·	2.6 km	MPC · JPL
69533	1997 GT_{17}	—	April 3, 1997	Socorro	LINEAR	·	5.9 km	MPC · JPL
69534	1997 GG_{20}	—	April 5, 1997	Socorro	LINEAR	·	4.8 km	MPC · JPL
69535	1997 GN_{23}	—	April 6, 1997	Socorro	LINEAR	·	3.3 km	MPC · JPL
69536	1997 GN_{24}	—	April 7, 1997	Socorro	LINEAR	MAR	3.3 km	MPC · JPL
69537	1997 GZ_{32}	—	April 3, 1997	Socorro	LINEAR	·	3.3 km	MPC · JPL
69538	1997 GH_{36}	—	April 6, 1997	Socorro	LINEAR	EUN	5.8 km	MPC · JPL
69539	1997 GO_{40}	—	April 7, 1997	La Silla	E. W. Elst	·	2.4 km	MPC · JPL
69540	1997 HA_{1}	—	April 29, 1997	Modra	A. Galád, A. Pravda	·	2.7 km	MPC · JPL
69541	1997 HZ_{9}	—	April 30, 1997	Socorro	LINEAR	·	5.5 km	MPC · JPL
69542	1997 HL_{10}	—	April 30, 1997	Socorro	LINEAR	(7744)	3.7 km	MPC · JPL
69543	1997 JZ_{2}	—	May 4, 1997	Mauna Kea	Veillet, C.	·	2.9 km	MPC · JPL
69544	1997 JV_{9}	—	May 9, 1997	Mauna Kea	Veillet, C.	·	4.1 km	MPC · JPL
69545	1997 JF_{10}	—	May 11, 1997	Prescott	P. G. Comba	·	3.2 km	MPC · JPL
69546	1997 JO_{13}	—	May 3, 1997	La Silla	E. W. Elst	·	3.0 km	MPC · JPL
69547	1997 KU_{1}	—	May 27, 1997	Kitt Peak	Spacewatch	·	2.4 km	MPC · JPL
69548	1997 LA_{3}	—	June 5, 1997	Kitt Peak	Spacewatch	·	5.6 km	MPC · JPL
69549	1997 LC_{4}	—	June 9, 1997	Rand	G. R. Viscome	H	1.5 km	MPC · JPL
69550	1997 LA_{6}	—	June 13, 1997	Kitt Peak	Spacewatch	·	6.3 km	MPC · JPL
69551	1997 MY_{2}	—	June 28, 1997	Socorro	LINEAR	·	6.0 km	MPC · JPL
69552	1997 MT_{4}	—	June 28, 1997	Socorro	LINEAR	·	4.8 km	MPC · JPL
69553	1997 QS_{2}	—	August 31, 1997	Kleť	Z. Moravec	·	7.7 km	MPC · JPL
69554	1997 SZ_{4}	—	September 25, 1997	Farra d'Isonzo	Farra d'Isonzo	·	8.0 km	MPC · JPL
69555	1997 SQ_{9}	—	September 28, 1997	Kitt Peak	Spacewatch	·	6.2 km	MPC · JPL
69556 Félixdelafuente	1997 SA_{31}	Félixdelafuente	September 27, 1997	Mallorca	Á. López J., R. Pacheco	·	9.4 km	MPC · JPL
69557	1997 SY_{31}	—	September 30, 1997	Kitt Peak	Spacewatch	VER	6.6 km	MPC · JPL
69558	1997 TA_{26}	—	October 10, 1997	Xinglong	SCAP	·	5.4 km	MPC · JPL
69559	1997 UG_{5}	—	October 27, 1997	Prescott	P. G. Comba	(69559)	9.9 km	MPC · JPL
69560	1997 UW_{14}	—	October 31, 1997	Ondřejov	P. Pravec	·	7.9 km	MPC · JPL
69561	1997 YD_{2}	—	December 21, 1997	Oizumi	T. Kobayashi	·	2.2 km	MPC · JPL
69562	1997 YU_{6}	—	December 25, 1997	Chichibu	N. Satō	V	1.9 km	MPC · JPL
69563	1997 YP_{10}	—	December 28, 1997	Oizumi	T. Kobayashi	·	1.8 km	MPC · JPL
69564	1997 YA_{18}	—	December 31, 1997	Kitt Peak	Spacewatch	·	1.5 km	MPC · JPL
69565 Giulioscarfi	1998 AZ_{4}	Giulioscarfi	January 5, 1998	Monte Viseggi	L. Sannino, Pietrapiana, P.	·	1.9 km	MPC · JPL
69566	1998 BX	—	January 19, 1998	Oizumi	T. Kobayashi	T_{j} (2.99) · 3:2 · SHU	16 km	MPC · JPL
69567	1998 BC_{8}	—	January 25, 1998	Oizumi	T. Kobayashi	·	2.6 km	MPC · JPL
69568	1998 BK_{12}	—	January 23, 1998	Socorro	LINEAR	V · slow	2.0 km	MPC · JPL
69569	1998 BU_{12}	—	January 23, 1998	Socorro	LINEAR	V	1.5 km	MPC · JPL
69570	1998 BT_{24}	—	January 28, 1998	Oizumi	T. Kobayashi	·	3.6 km	MPC · JPL
69571	1998 BJ_{25}	—	January 28, 1998	Oizumi	T. Kobayashi	·	2.7 km	MPC · JPL
69572	1998 BY_{25}	—	January 29, 1998	Oizumi	T. Kobayashi	·	3.8 km	MPC · JPL
69573	1998 BQ_{26}	—	January 28, 1998	Sormano	P. Sicoli, A. Testa	·	2.0 km	MPC · JPL
69574	1998 BR_{35}	—	January 28, 1998	Kitt Peak	Spacewatch	V	1.4 km	MPC · JPL
69575	1998 BT_{36}	—	January 22, 1998	Kitt Peak	Spacewatch	MAS	1.2 km	MPC · JPL
69576	1998 BQ_{46}	—	January 28, 1998	Caussols	ODAS	·	2.1 km	MPC · JPL
69577	1998 CE_{5}	—	February 6, 1998	La Silla	E. W. Elst	·	4.7 km	MPC · JPL
69578	1998 DC	—	February 16, 1998	Xinglong	SCAP	·	2.4 km	MPC · JPL
69579	1998 DQ_{1}	—	February 20, 1998	Kleť	Kleť	·	1.2 km	MPC · JPL
69580	1998 DR_{7}	—	February 22, 1998	Haleakala	NEAT	·	6.0 km	MPC · JPL
69581	1998 DX_{8}	—	February 23, 1998	Kitt Peak	Spacewatch	·	2.0 km	MPC · JPL
69582	1998 DM_{10}	—	February 23, 1998	Haleakala	NEAT	·	3.4 km	MPC · JPL
69583	1998 DP_{10}	—	February 23, 1998	Haleakala	NEAT	·	2.0 km	MPC · JPL
69584	1998 DZ_{10}	—	February 17, 1998	Xinglong	SCAP	·	2.1 km	MPC · JPL
69585 Albertoraugei	1998 DN_{35}	Albertoraugei	February 27, 1998	Cima Ekar	A. Boattini, M. Tombelli	·	3.5 km	MPC · JPL
69586	1998 DE_{36}	—	February 25, 1998	La Silla	E. W. Elst	·	2.6 km	MPC · JPL
69587	1998 EZ_{1}	—	March 2, 1998	Caussols	ODAS	·	2.9 km	MPC · JPL
69588	1998 EF_{4}	—	March 2, 1998	Kitt Peak	Spacewatch	·	1.5 km	MPC · JPL
69589	1998 EM_{7}	—	March 1, 1998	Kitt Peak	Spacewatch	·	1.7 km	MPC · JPL
69590	1998 EL_{8}	—	March 3, 1998	Nachi-Katsuura	Y. Shimizu, T. Urata	·	3.0 km	MPC · JPL
69591	1998 EV_{13}	—	March 1, 1998	La Silla	E. W. Elst	·	3.0 km	MPC · JPL
69592	1998 EO_{14}	—	March 1, 1998	La Silla	E. W. Elst	·	4.7 km	MPC · JPL
69593	1998 EN_{21}	—	March 11, 1998	Xinglong	SCAP	·	2.3 km	MPC · JPL
69594 Ulferika	1998 FF_{11}	Ulferika	March 24, 1998	Drebach	G. Lehmann	NYS	2.5 km	MPC · JPL
69595	1998 FK_{11}	—	March 22, 1998	Oizumi	T. Kobayashi	V	2.0 km	MPC · JPL
69596 Balkowski	1998 FT_{14}	Balkowski	March 26, 1998	Caussols	ODAS	V	2.1 km	MPC · JPL
69597	1998 FQ_{15}	—	March 28, 1998	Caussols	ODAS	·	2.0 km	MPC · JPL
69598	1998 FT_{18}	—	March 20, 1998	Socorro	LINEAR	·	2.6 km	MPC · JPL
69599	1998 FH_{19}	—	March 20, 1998	Socorro	LINEAR	·	2.8 km	MPC · JPL
69600	1998 FC_{23}	—	March 20, 1998	Socorro	LINEAR	·	2.5 km	MPC · JPL

== 69601–69700 ==
back to top

Designation			Discovery			Properties		Ref
Permanent	Provisional	Named after	Date	Site	Discoverer(s)	Category	Diam.	Ref
69601	1998 FB_{27}	—	March 20, 1998	Socorro	LINEAR	·	2.6 km	MPC · JPL
69602	1998 FE_{28}	—	March 20, 1998	Socorro	LINEAR	·	2.4 km	MPC · JPL
69603	1998 FD_{29}	—	March 20, 1998	Socorro	LINEAR	·	2.1 km	MPC · JPL
69604	1998 FH_{35}	—	March 20, 1998	Socorro	LINEAR	·	2.1 km	MPC · JPL
69605	1998 FA_{38}	—	March 20, 1998	Socorro	LINEAR	·	2.5 km	MPC · JPL
69606	1998 FX_{40}	—	March 20, 1998	Socorro	LINEAR	·	2.7 km	MPC · JPL
69607	1998 FZ_{41}	—	March 20, 1998	Socorro	LINEAR	NYS	2.4 km	MPC · JPL
69608	1998 FJ_{42}	—	March 20, 1998	Socorro	LINEAR	·	3.2 km	MPC · JPL
69609	1998 FQ_{42}	—	March 20, 1998	Socorro	LINEAR	·	2.0 km	MPC · JPL
69610	1998 FD_{43}	—	March 20, 1998	Socorro	LINEAR	NYS	2.9 km	MPC · JPL
69611	1998 FP_{46}	—	March 20, 1998	Socorro	LINEAR	·	1.6 km	MPC · JPL
69612	1998 FW_{46}	—	March 20, 1998	Socorro	LINEAR	·	1.7 km	MPC · JPL
69613	1998 FK_{47}	—	March 20, 1998	Socorro	LINEAR	·	4.4 km	MPC · JPL
69614	1998 FK_{48}	—	March 20, 1998	Socorro	LINEAR	·	2.1 km	MPC · JPL
69615	1998 FF_{49}	—	March 20, 1998	Socorro	LINEAR	NYS	2.0 km	MPC · JPL
69616	1998 FY_{49}	—	March 20, 1998	Socorro	LINEAR	V	1.6 km	MPC · JPL
69617	1998 FD_{52}	—	March 20, 1998	Socorro	LINEAR	(2076)	2.8 km	MPC · JPL
69618	1998 FY_{52}	—	March 20, 1998	Socorro	LINEAR	·	2.2 km	MPC · JPL
69619	1998 FM_{53}	—	March 20, 1998	Socorro	LINEAR	·	2.3 km	MPC · JPL
69620	1998 FP_{53}	—	March 20, 1998	Socorro	LINEAR	·	2.1 km	MPC · JPL
69621	1998 FA_{54}	—	March 20, 1998	Socorro	LINEAR	·	2.9 km	MPC · JPL
69622	1998 FS_{54}	—	March 20, 1998	Socorro	LINEAR	·	2.7 km	MPC · JPL
69623	1998 FM_{55}	—	March 20, 1998	Socorro	LINEAR	·	2.2 km	MPC · JPL
69624	1998 FN_{57}	—	March 20, 1998	Socorro	LINEAR	·	2.1 km	MPC · JPL
69625	1998 FG_{58}	—	March 20, 1998	Socorro	LINEAR	V	2.9 km	MPC · JPL
69626	1998 FM_{59}	—	March 20, 1998	Socorro	LINEAR	NYS ·	4.9 km	MPC · JPL
69627	1998 FC_{62}	—	March 20, 1998	Socorro	LINEAR	·	3.5 km	MPC · JPL
69628	1998 FD_{62}	—	March 20, 1998	Socorro	LINEAR	V	2.2 km	MPC · JPL
69629	1998 FS_{62}	—	March 20, 1998	Socorro	LINEAR	·	1.8 km	MPC · JPL
69630	1998 FA_{63}	—	March 20, 1998	Socorro	LINEAR	·	2.3 km	MPC · JPL
69631	1998 FF_{63}	—	March 20, 1998	Socorro	LINEAR	EUN	2.0 km	MPC · JPL
69632	1998 FN_{64}	—	March 20, 1998	Socorro	LINEAR	·	1.7 km	MPC · JPL
69633	1998 FM_{65}	—	March 20, 1998	Socorro	LINEAR	·	1.6 km	MPC · JPL
69634	1998 FH_{68}	—	March 20, 1998	Socorro	LINEAR	NYS	2.6 km	MPC · JPL
69635	1998 FJ_{68}	—	March 20, 1998	Socorro	LINEAR	·	2.8 km	MPC · JPL
69636	1998 FE_{71}	—	March 20, 1998	Socorro	LINEAR	·	2.0 km	MPC · JPL
69637	1998 FN_{71}	—	March 20, 1998	Socorro	LINEAR	·	2.7 km	MPC · JPL
69638	1998 FU_{71}	—	March 20, 1998	Socorro	LINEAR	·	2.4 km	MPC · JPL
69639	1998 FR_{75}	—	March 24, 1998	Socorro	LINEAR	V	2.5 km	MPC · JPL
69640	1998 FP_{76}	—	March 24, 1998	Socorro	LINEAR	·	2.8 km	MPC · JPL
69641	1998 FQ_{77}	—	March 24, 1998	Socorro	LINEAR	·	2.5 km	MPC · JPL
69642	1998 FX_{77}	—	March 24, 1998	Socorro	LINEAR	·	2.1 km	MPC · JPL
69643	1998 FY_{77}	—	March 24, 1998	Socorro	LINEAR	·	2.2 km	MPC · JPL
69644	1998 FT_{78}	—	March 24, 1998	Socorro	LINEAR	·	2.0 km	MPC · JPL
69645	1998 FM_{79}	—	March 24, 1998	Socorro	LINEAR	·	2.9 km	MPC · JPL
69646	1998 FV_{79}	—	March 24, 1998	Socorro	LINEAR	·	2.1 km	MPC · JPL
69647	1998 FO_{84}	—	March 24, 1998	Socorro	LINEAR	·	2.2 km	MPC · JPL
69648	1998 FW_{87}	—	March 24, 1998	Socorro	LINEAR	·	1.7 km	MPC · JPL
69649	1998 FK_{98}	—	March 31, 1998	Socorro	LINEAR	·	2.0 km	MPC · JPL
69650	1998 FT_{99}	—	March 31, 1998	Socorro	LINEAR	·	2.9 km	MPC · JPL
69651	1998 FW_{99}	—	March 31, 1998	Socorro	LINEAR	·	3.4 km	MPC · JPL
69652	1998 FJ_{101}	—	March 31, 1998	Socorro	LINEAR	·	2.9 km	MPC · JPL
69653	1998 FT_{101}	—	March 31, 1998	Socorro	LINEAR	slow	2.8 km	MPC · JPL
69654	1998 FR_{102}	—	March 31, 1998	Socorro	LINEAR	·	3.2 km	MPC · JPL
69655	1998 FD_{106}	—	March 31, 1998	Socorro	LINEAR	V	1.4 km	MPC · JPL
69656	1998 FV_{108}	—	March 31, 1998	Socorro	LINEAR	·	2.4 km	MPC · JPL
69657	1998 FX_{108}	—	March 31, 1998	Socorro	LINEAR	·	2.7 km	MPC · JPL
69658	1998 FC_{114}	—	March 31, 1998	Socorro	LINEAR	·	3.1 km	MPC · JPL
69659	1998 FE_{116}	—	March 31, 1998	Socorro	LINEAR	·	2.9 km	MPC · JPL
69660	1998 FP_{117}	—	March 31, 1998	Socorro	LINEAR	·	4.2 km	MPC · JPL
69661	1998 FZ_{117}	—	March 31, 1998	Socorro	LINEAR	·	2.8 km	MPC · JPL
69662	1998 FR_{118}	—	March 31, 1998	Socorro	LINEAR	·	3.0 km	MPC · JPL
69663	1998 FM_{119}	—	March 31, 1998	Socorro	LINEAR	·	2.9 km	MPC · JPL
69664	1998 FN_{122}	—	March 20, 1998	Socorro	LINEAR	·	2.8 km	MPC · JPL
69665	1998 FQ_{122}	—	March 20, 1998	Socorro	LINEAR	·	4.5 km	MPC · JPL
69666	1998 FC_{123}	—	March 20, 1998	Socorro	LINEAR	slow	2.5 km	MPC · JPL
69667	1998 FL_{131}	—	March 22, 1998	Socorro	LINEAR	MAS	1.4 km	MPC · JPL
69668	1998 FD_{133}	—	March 20, 1998	Socorro	LINEAR	·	2.0 km	MPC · JPL
69669	1998 FF_{137}	—	March 28, 1998	Socorro	LINEAR	NYS	2.0 km	MPC · JPL
69670	1998 FM_{141}	—	March 29, 1998	Socorro	LINEAR	NYS	2.0 km	MPC · JPL
69671	1998 GY_{3}	—	April 2, 1998	Socorro	LINEAR	·	3.2 km	MPC · JPL
69672	1998 GX_{7}	—	April 2, 1998	Socorro	LINEAR	PHO	2.8 km	MPC · JPL
69673	1998 GX_{10}	—	April 2, 1998	La Silla	E. W. Elst	·	2.9 km	MPC · JPL
69674	1998 HP_{3}	—	April 19, 1998	Kitt Peak	Spacewatch	·	3.1 km	MPC · JPL
69675	1998 HT_{7}	—	April 23, 1998	Socorro	LINEAR	PHO	2.4 km	MPC · JPL
69676	1998 HV_{13}	—	April 18, 1998	Socorro	LINEAR	V	1.4 km	MPC · JPL
69677	1998 HC_{14}	—	April 24, 1998	Haleakala	NEAT	·	2.1 km	MPC · JPL
69678	1998 HA_{15}	—	April 18, 1998	Kitt Peak	Spacewatch	·	2.4 km	MPC · JPL
69679	1998 HR_{15}	—	April 22, 1998	Kitt Peak	Spacewatch	SUL	4.0 km	MPC · JPL
69680	1998 HC_{16}	—	April 22, 1998	Kitt Peak	Spacewatch	·	2.8 km	MPC · JPL
69681	1998 HN_{17}	—	April 18, 1998	Socorro	LINEAR	·	2.6 km	MPC · JPL
69682	1998 HA_{19}	—	April 18, 1998	Socorro	LINEAR	·	2.5 km	MPC · JPL
69683	1998 HK_{21}	—	April 20, 1998	Socorro	LINEAR	NYS	2.3 km	MPC · JPL
69684	1998 HA_{22}	—	April 20, 1998	Socorro	LINEAR	·	2.0 km	MPC · JPL
69685	1998 HD_{22}	—	April 20, 1998	Socorro	LINEAR	EUN	2.2 km	MPC · JPL
69686	1998 HR_{23}	—	April 28, 1998	Prescott	P. G. Comba	NYS	2.5 km	MPC · JPL
69687	1998 HK_{24}	—	April 24, 1998	Mauna Kea	Veillet, C.	·	2.7 km	MPC · JPL
69688	1998 HD_{25}	—	April 18, 1998	Kitt Peak	Spacewatch	·	2.3 km	MPC · JPL
69689	1998 HV_{28}	—	April 27, 1998	Kitt Peak	Spacewatch	V	1.3 km	MPC · JPL
69690	1998 HL_{30}	—	April 20, 1998	Socorro	LINEAR	·	2.6 km	MPC · JPL
69691	1998 HQ_{32}	—	April 20, 1998	Socorro	LINEAR	·	2.7 km	MPC · JPL
69692	1998 HZ_{32}	—	April 20, 1998	Socorro	LINEAR	NYS	2.0 km	MPC · JPL
69693	1998 HX_{33}	—	April 20, 1998	Socorro	LINEAR	·	2.5 km	MPC · JPL
69694	1998 HQ_{35}	—	April 20, 1998	Socorro	LINEAR	·	2.2 km	MPC · JPL
69695	1998 HL_{36}	—	April 20, 1998	Socorro	LINEAR	·	2.2 km	MPC · JPL
69696	1998 HA_{38}	—	April 20, 1998	Socorro	LINEAR	V	1.7 km	MPC · JPL
69697	1998 HH_{39}	—	April 20, 1998	Socorro	LINEAR	·	2.7 km	MPC · JPL
69698	1998 HW_{43}	—	April 20, 1998	Socorro	LINEAR	·	2.2 km	MPC · JPL
69699	1998 HS_{45}	—	April 20, 1998	Socorro	LINEAR	·	3.1 km	MPC · JPL
69700	1998 HL_{46}	—	April 20, 1998	Socorro	LINEAR	NYS	2.8 km	MPC · JPL

== 69701–69800 ==
back to top

Designation			Discovery			Properties		Ref
Permanent	Provisional	Named after	Date	Site	Discoverer(s)	Category	Diam.	Ref
69701	1998 HP_{49}	—	April 30, 1998	Haleakala	NEAT	·	1.8 km	MPC · JPL
69702	1998 HP_{57}	—	April 21, 1998	Socorro	LINEAR	·	5.7 km	MPC · JPL
69703	1998 HQ_{63}	—	April 21, 1998	Socorro	LINEAR	·	6.1 km	MPC · JPL
69704	1998 HS_{69}	—	April 21, 1998	Socorro	LINEAR	V	1.8 km	MPC · JPL
69705	1998 HM_{70}	—	April 21, 1998	Socorro	LINEAR	·	3.1 km	MPC · JPL
69706	1998 HJ_{77}	—	April 21, 1998	Socorro	LINEAR	·	3.0 km	MPC · JPL
69707	1998 HP_{79}	—	April 21, 1998	Socorro	LINEAR	·	2.2 km	MPC · JPL
69708	1998 HX_{85}	—	April 21, 1998	Socorro	LINEAR	NYS ·	5.0 km	MPC · JPL
69709	1998 HH_{87}	—	April 21, 1998	Socorro	LINEAR	·	3.3 km	MPC · JPL
69710	1998 HR_{88}	—	April 21, 1998	Socorro	LINEAR	·	1.9 km	MPC · JPL
69711	1998 HA_{89}	—	April 21, 1998	Socorro	LINEAR	EUN	2.4 km	MPC · JPL
69712	1998 HV_{90}	—	April 21, 1998	Socorro	LINEAR	V	1.8 km	MPC · JPL
69713	1998 HB_{98}	—	April 21, 1998	Socorro	LINEAR	·	3.5 km	MPC · JPL
69714	1998 HR_{98}	—	April 21, 1998	Socorro	LINEAR	·	3.1 km	MPC · JPL
69715	1998 HG_{104}	—	April 23, 1998	Socorro	LINEAR	·	3.3 km	MPC · JPL
69716	1998 HG_{105}	—	April 23, 1998	Socorro	LINEAR	·	2.5 km	MPC · JPL
69717	1998 HH_{108}	—	April 23, 1998	Socorro	LINEAR	·	2.6 km	MPC · JPL
69718	1998 HH_{116}	—	April 23, 1998	Socorro	LINEAR	·	4.6 km	MPC · JPL
69719	1998 HY_{119}	—	April 23, 1998	Socorro	LINEAR	·	2.0 km	MPC · JPL
69720	1998 HW_{120}	—	April 23, 1998	Socorro	LINEAR	·	2.3 km	MPC · JPL
69721	1998 HJ_{125}	—	April 23, 1998	Socorro	LINEAR	·	2.5 km	MPC · JPL
69722	1998 HO_{127}	—	April 18, 1998	Socorro	LINEAR	V	1.5 km	MPC · JPL
69723	1998 HV_{129}	—	April 19, 1998	Socorro	LINEAR	·	1.9 km	MPC · JPL
69724	1998 HF_{133}	—	April 19, 1998	Socorro	LINEAR	·	2.8 km	MPC · JPL
69725	1998 HA_{137}	—	April 20, 1998	Socorro	LINEAR	V	1.6 km	MPC · JPL
69726	1998 HR_{144}	—	April 21, 1998	Socorro	LINEAR	·	2.4 km	MPC · JPL
69727	1998 HD_{145}	—	April 21, 1998	Socorro	LINEAR	·	2.5 km	MPC · JPL
69728	1998 HG_{145}	—	April 21, 1998	Socorro	LINEAR	·	3.0 km	MPC · JPL
69729	1998 HE_{149}	—	April 25, 1998	La Silla	E. W. Elst	ADE	6.4 km	MPC · JPL
69730	1998 HF_{149}	—	April 25, 1998	La Silla	E. W. Elst	fast	4.3 km	MPC · JPL
69731	1998 HP_{152}	—	April 22, 1998	Socorro	LINEAR	·	1.8 km	MPC · JPL
69732	1998 JE	—	May 1, 1998	Kitt Peak	Spacewatch	·	4.2 km	MPC · JPL
69733	1998 JS_{2}	—	May 1, 1998	Anderson Mesa	LONEOS	·	3.0 km	MPC · JPL
69734	1998 KF_{1}	—	May 18, 1998	Anderson Mesa	LONEOS	NYS	2.5 km	MPC · JPL
69735	1998 KB_{7}	—	May 22, 1998	Anderson Mesa	LONEOS	V	2.4 km	MPC · JPL
69736	1998 KT_{7}	—	May 23, 1998	Anderson Mesa	LONEOS	·	3.0 km	MPC · JPL
69737	1998 KS_{12}	—	May 22, 1998	Socorro	LINEAR	·	4.0 km	MPC · JPL
69738	1998 KL_{16}	—	May 22, 1998	Socorro	LINEAR	·	2.1 km	MPC · JPL
69739	1998 KX_{19}	—	May 22, 1998	Socorro	LINEAR	·	2.1 km	MPC · JPL
69740	1998 KK_{26}	—	May 22, 1998	Kitt Peak	Spacewatch	EUN	3.2 km	MPC · JPL
69741	1998 KR_{43}	—	May 23, 1998	Socorro	LINEAR	PHO	3.6 km	MPC · JPL
69742	1998 KD_{44}	—	May 22, 1998	Socorro	LINEAR	·	2.1 km	MPC · JPL
69743	1998 KG_{53}	—	May 23, 1998	Socorro	LINEAR	·	3.8 km	MPC · JPL
69744	1998 KM_{56}	—	May 22, 1998	Socorro	LINEAR	·	2.6 km	MPC · JPL
69745	1998 KR_{57}	—	May 22, 1998	Socorro	LINEAR	·	2.4 km	MPC · JPL
69746	1998 KC_{58}	—	May 28, 1998	Xinglong	SCAP	·	2.7 km	MPC · JPL
69747	1998 KD_{58}	—	May 28, 1998	Xinglong	SCAP	·	2.9 km	MPC · JPL
69748	1998 KG_{59}	—	May 23, 1998	Socorro	LINEAR	·	2.1 km	MPC · JPL
69749	1998 MZ_{1}	—	June 21, 1998	Prescott	P. G. Comba	·	7.4 km	MPC · JPL
69750	1998 MA_{5}	—	June 19, 1998	Kitt Peak	Spacewatch	·	5.9 km	MPC · JPL
69751	1998 MV_{17}	—	June 22, 1998	Kitt Peak	Spacewatch	·	4.2 km	MPC · JPL
69752	1998 ME_{32}	—	June 24, 1998	Socorro	LINEAR	(5)	2.8 km	MPC · JPL
69753	1998 ML_{34}	—	June 24, 1998	Socorro	LINEAR	·	4.1 km	MPC · JPL
69754 Mosesmendel	1998 MM_{39}	Mosesmendel	June 26, 1998	La Silla	E. W. Elst	ADE	5.8 km	MPC · JPL
69755	1998 MQ_{40}	—	June 26, 1998	La Silla	E. W. Elst	·	2.7 km	MPC · JPL
69756 Hélènecourtois	1998 OY_{3}	Hélènecourtois	July 24, 1998	Caussols	ODAS	HOF	4.0 km	MPC · JPL
69757	1998 OD_{7}	—	July 28, 1998	Xinglong	SCAP	GEF	3.6 km	MPC · JPL
69758	1998 OP_{10}	—	July 26, 1998	La Silla	E. W. Elst	ADE	8.8 km	MPC · JPL
69759	1998 OT_{10}	—	July 26, 1998	La Silla	E. W. Elst	HOF	7.7 km	MPC · JPL
69760	1998 PR	—	August 15, 1998	Prescott	P. G. Comba	PAD	6.7 km	MPC · JPL
69761	1998 QM_{4}	—	August 21, 1998	Woomera	F. B. Zoltowski	·	3.2 km	MPC · JPL
69762	1998 QS_{5}	—	August 23, 1998	Prescott	P. G. Comba	·	7.6 km	MPC · JPL
69763	1998 QH_{9}	—	August 17, 1998	Socorro	LINEAR	·	5.9 km	MPC · JPL
69764	1998 QS_{10}	—	August 17, 1998	Socorro	LINEAR	ADE	5.8 km	MPC · JPL
69765	1998 QN_{12}	—	August 17, 1998	Socorro	LINEAR	·	6.3 km	MPC · JPL
69766	1998 QZ_{19}	—	August 17, 1998	Socorro	LINEAR	PAD	5.7 km	MPC · JPL
69767	1998 QA_{20}	—	August 17, 1998	Socorro	LINEAR	·	5.3 km	MPC · JPL
69768	1998 QF_{24}	—	August 17, 1998	Socorro	LINEAR	·	5.0 km	MPC · JPL
69769	1998 QM_{24}	—	August 17, 1998	Socorro	LINEAR	·	4.0 km	MPC · JPL
69770	1998 QN_{26}	—	August 24, 1998	Reedy Creek	J. Broughton	·	5.3 km	MPC · JPL
69771	1998 QT_{32}	—	August 17, 1998	Socorro	LINEAR	KOR	3.6 km	MPC · JPL
69772	1998 QU_{32}	—	August 17, 1998	Socorro	LINEAR	·	5.5 km	MPC · JPL
69773	1998 QT_{34}	—	August 17, 1998	Socorro	LINEAR	·	4.2 km	MPC · JPL
69774	1998 QN_{41}	—	August 17, 1998	Socorro	LINEAR	KOR	3.8 km	MPC · JPL
69775	1998 QK_{46}	—	August 17, 1998	Socorro	LINEAR	·	6.8 km	MPC · JPL
69776	1998 QB_{49}	—	August 17, 1998	Socorro	LINEAR	·	3.2 km	MPC · JPL
69777	1998 QJ_{49}	—	August 17, 1998	Socorro	LINEAR	GAL	4.4 km	MPC · JPL
69778	1998 QM_{53}	—	August 20, 1998	Anderson Mesa	LONEOS	EOS	5.6 km	MPC · JPL
69779	1998 QZ_{53}	—	August 19, 1998	Anderson Mesa	LONEOS	(32418)	4.7 km	MPC · JPL
69780	1998 QG_{55}	—	August 27, 1998	Anderson Mesa	LONEOS	·	6.4 km	MPC · JPL
69781	1998 QL_{59}	—	August 26, 1998	Kitt Peak	Spacewatch	·	4.5 km	MPC · JPL
69782	1998 QF_{60}	—	August 26, 1998	Kitt Peak	Spacewatch	KOR	3.6 km	MPC · JPL
69783	1998 QC_{67}	—	August 24, 1998	Socorro	LINEAR	·	3.8 km	MPC · JPL
69784	1998 QP_{70}	—	August 24, 1998	Socorro	LINEAR	EUN	3.2 km	MPC · JPL
69785	1998 QU_{71}	—	August 24, 1998	Socorro	LINEAR	·	6.6 km	MPC · JPL
69786	1998 QS_{77}	—	August 24, 1998	Socorro	LINEAR	·	5.5 km	MPC · JPL
69787	1998 QH_{80}	—	August 24, 1998	Socorro	LINEAR	·	3.4 km	MPC · JPL
69788	1998 QY_{85}	—	August 24, 1998	Socorro	LINEAR	·	4.1 km	MPC · JPL
69789	1998 QS_{87}	—	August 24, 1998	Socorro	LINEAR	·	3.8 km	MPC · JPL
69790	1998 QM_{88}	—	August 24, 1998	Socorro	LINEAR	·	5.8 km	MPC · JPL
69791	1998 QG_{89}	—	August 24, 1998	Socorro	LINEAR	·	4.7 km	MPC · JPL
69792	1998 QS_{96}	—	August 19, 1998	Socorro	LINEAR	·	7.9 km	MPC · JPL
69793	1998 QV_{96}	—	August 19, 1998	Socorro	LINEAR	·	4.1 km	MPC · JPL
69794	1998 QM_{104}	—	August 26, 1998	La Silla	E. W. Elst	·	6.7 km	MPC · JPL
69795	1998 RA_{3}	—	September 13, 1998	Kitt Peak	Spacewatch	KOR	3.2 km	MPC · JPL
69796	1998 RV_{5}	—	September 15, 1998	Caussols	ODAS	·	4.4 km	MPC · JPL
69797	1998 RF_{6}	—	September 14, 1998	Anderson Mesa	LONEOS	·	3.1 km	MPC · JPL
69798	1998 RU_{11}	—	September 13, 1998	Kitt Peak	Spacewatch	EOS	4.4 km	MPC · JPL
69799	1998 RD_{12}	—	September 14, 1998	Kitt Peak	Spacewatch	·	3.3 km	MPC · JPL
69800	1998 RD_{13}	—	September 14, 1998	Kitt Peak	Spacewatch	KOR	4.1 km	MPC · JPL

== 69801–69900 ==
back to top

Designation			Discovery			Properties		Ref
Permanent	Provisional	Named after	Date	Site	Discoverer(s)	Category	Diam.	Ref
69801	1998 RS_{14}	—	September 14, 1998	Kitt Peak	Spacewatch	·	6.6 km	MPC · JPL
69802	1998 RX_{15}	—	September 14, 1998	Xinglong	SCAP	KOR	3.4 km	MPC · JPL
69803	1998 RL_{20}	—	September 15, 1998	Reedy Creek	J. Broughton	·	4.1 km	MPC · JPL
69804	1998 RV_{22}	—	September 14, 1998	Socorro	LINEAR	GEF	2.9 km	MPC · JPL
69805	1998 RF_{23}	—	September 14, 1998	Socorro	LINEAR	·	5.4 km	MPC · JPL
69806	1998 RC_{24}	—	September 14, 1998	Socorro	LINEAR	·	4.4 km	MPC · JPL
69807	1998 RE_{24}	—	September 14, 1998	Socorro	LINEAR	AGN	2.8 km	MPC · JPL
69808	1998 RO_{29}	—	September 14, 1998	Socorro	LINEAR	·	4.6 km	MPC · JPL
69809	1998 RM_{33}	—	September 14, 1998	Socorro	LINEAR	MRX	3.1 km	MPC · JPL
69810	1998 RF_{42}	—	September 14, 1998	Socorro	LINEAR	·	5.4 km	MPC · JPL
69811	1998 RC_{47}	—	September 14, 1998	Socorro	LINEAR	·	7.4 km	MPC · JPL
69812	1998 RV_{47}	—	September 14, 1998	Socorro	LINEAR	EOS	3.9 km	MPC · JPL
69813	1998 RB_{50}	—	September 14, 1998	Socorro	LINEAR	AGN	3.2 km	MPC · JPL
69814	1998 RD_{50}	—	September 14, 1998	Socorro	LINEAR	·	3.5 km	MPC · JPL
69815	1998 RC_{54}	—	September 14, 1998	Socorro	LINEAR	·	6.0 km	MPC · JPL
69816	1998 RS_{57}	—	September 14, 1998	Socorro	LINEAR	GEF	3.6 km	MPC · JPL
69817	1998 RB_{58}	—	September 14, 1998	Socorro	LINEAR	·	3.1 km	MPC · JPL
69818	1998 RP_{61}	—	September 14, 1998	Socorro	LINEAR	·	5.6 km	MPC · JPL
69819	1998 RK_{62}	—	September 14, 1998	Socorro	LINEAR	·	5.5 km	MPC · JPL
69820	1998 RR_{63}	—	September 14, 1998	Socorro	LINEAR	·	3.3 km	MPC · JPL
69821	1998 RA_{65}	—	September 14, 1998	Socorro	LINEAR	KOR	3.4 km	MPC · JPL
69822	1998 RD_{65}	—	September 14, 1998	Socorro	LINEAR	·	3.3 km	MPC · JPL
69823	1998 RQ_{68}	—	September 14, 1998	Socorro	LINEAR	KOR	3.8 km	MPC · JPL
69824	1998 RO_{70}	—	September 14, 1998	Socorro	LINEAR	GEF	4.1 km	MPC · JPL
69825	1998 RU_{71}	—	September 14, 1998	Socorro	LINEAR	KOR ·	5.9 km	MPC · JPL
69826	1998 RE_{72}	—	September 14, 1998	Socorro	LINEAR	EOS	5.5 km	MPC · JPL
69827	1998 RR_{72}	—	September 14, 1998	Socorro	LINEAR	KOR	4.9 km	MPC · JPL
69828	1998 RX_{73}	—	September 14, 1998	Socorro	LINEAR	·	6.0 km	MPC · JPL
69829	1998 RS_{74}	—	September 14, 1998	Socorro	LINEAR	GEF	4.6 km	MPC · JPL
69830	1998 RA_{75}	—	September 14, 1998	Socorro	LINEAR	·	5.2 km	MPC · JPL
69831	1998 RO_{75}	—	September 14, 1998	Socorro	LINEAR	·	5.0 km	MPC · JPL
69832	1998 RA_{76}	—	September 14, 1998	Socorro	LINEAR	·	5.5 km	MPC · JPL
69833	1998 RO_{76}	—	September 14, 1998	Socorro	LINEAR	EOS	4.2 km	MPC · JPL
69834	1998 RH_{77}	—	September 14, 1998	Socorro	LINEAR	·	4.9 km	MPC · JPL
69835	1998 RV_{78}	—	September 14, 1998	Socorro	LINEAR	·	5.7 km	MPC · JPL
69836	1998 SZ_{2}	—	September 18, 1998	Goodricke-Pigott	R. A. Tucker	·	5.0 km	MPC · JPL
69837	1998 SE_{4}	—	September 19, 1998	Prescott	P. G. Comba	EOS	6.5 km	MPC · JPL
69838	1998 SX_{5}	—	September 20, 1998	Kitt Peak	Spacewatch	·	3.1 km	MPC · JPL
69839 Denishuber	1998 SJ_{10}	Denishuber	September 18, 1998	Caussols	ODAS	·	5.5 km	MPC · JPL
69840	1998 SM_{10}	—	September 16, 1998	Uenohara	N. Kawasato	·	9.3 km	MPC · JPL
69841	1998 SA_{12}	—	September 22, 1998	Caussols	ODAS	·	3.9 km	MPC · JPL
69842	1998 SE_{20}	—	September 20, 1998	Kitt Peak	Spacewatch	·	5.9 km	MPC · JPL
69843	1998 SL_{22}	—	September 23, 1998	Višnjan Observatory	Višnjan	KOR	3.2 km	MPC · JPL
69844	1998 SY_{22}	—	September 23, 1998	Woomera	F. B. Zoltowski	EOS	4.7 km	MPC · JPL
69845	1998 SU_{26}	—	September 24, 1998	Ondřejov	P. Pravec	·	11 km	MPC · JPL
69846	1998 SO_{32}	—	September 23, 1998	Kitt Peak	Spacewatch	·	4.2 km	MPC · JPL
69847	1998 SD_{35}	—	September 26, 1998	Socorro	LINEAR	H	990 m	MPC · JPL
69848 Thomaspetit	1998 SQ_{35}	Thomaspetit	September 22, 1998	Caussols	ODAS	·	11 km	MPC · JPL
69849	1998 SZ_{38}	—	September 23, 1998	Kitt Peak	Spacewatch	·	2.6 km	MPC · JPL
69850	1998 SN_{40}	—	September 24, 1998	Kitt Peak	Spacewatch	·	5.1 km	MPC · JPL
69851	1998 SY_{45}	—	September 25, 1998	Kitt Peak	Spacewatch	·	7.1 km	MPC · JPL
69852	1998 SH_{51}	—	September 26, 1998	Kitt Peak	Spacewatch	THM	3.9 km	MPC · JPL
69853	1998 SP_{53}	—	September 16, 1998	Anderson Mesa	LONEOS	·	7.5 km	MPC · JPL
69854	1998 SS_{54}	—	September 16, 1998	Anderson Mesa	LONEOS	·	6.5 km	MPC · JPL
69855	1998 SX_{55}	—	September 16, 1998	Anderson Mesa	LONEOS	·	4.5 km	MPC · JPL
69856	1998 SZ_{56}	—	September 17, 1998	Anderson Mesa	LONEOS	KOR	3.6 km	MPC · JPL
69857	1998 SG_{57}	—	September 17, 1998	Anderson Mesa	LONEOS	KOR	3.9 km	MPC · JPL
69858	1998 SM_{57}	—	September 17, 1998	Anderson Mesa	LONEOS	·	4.7 km	MPC · JPL
69859	1998 SQ_{57}	—	September 17, 1998	Anderson Mesa	LONEOS	·	6.7 km	MPC · JPL
69860	1998 SX_{57}	—	September 17, 1998	Anderson Mesa	LONEOS	·	4.9 km	MPC · JPL
69861	1998 SP_{58}	—	September 17, 1998	Anderson Mesa	LONEOS	EOS	5.3 km	MPC · JPL
69862	1998 SB_{59}	—	September 17, 1998	Anderson Mesa	LONEOS	·	7.5 km	MPC · JPL
69863	1998 SD_{59}	—	September 17, 1998	Anderson Mesa	LONEOS	KOR	4.5 km	MPC · JPL
69864	1998 SG_{59}	—	September 17, 1998	Anderson Mesa	LONEOS	·	6.3 km	MPC · JPL
69865	1998 SO_{60}	—	September 17, 1998	Anderson Mesa	LONEOS	·	4.5 km	MPC · JPL
69866	1998 ST_{60}	—	September 17, 1998	Anderson Mesa	LONEOS	KOR	3.8 km	MPC · JPL
69867	1998 SA_{61}	—	September 17, 1998	Anderson Mesa	LONEOS	KOR	3.7 km	MPC · JPL
69868	1998 SU_{61}	—	September 17, 1998	Anderson Mesa	LONEOS	EOS	5.4 km	MPC · JPL
69869 Haining	1998 SX_{62}	Haining	September 25, 1998	Xinglong	SCAP	·	9.6 km	MPC · JPL
69870 Fizeau	1998 SM_{64}	Fizeau	September 20, 1998	La Silla	E. W. Elst	·	8.3 km	MPC · JPL
69871	1998 SW_{64}	—	September 20, 1998	La Silla	E. W. Elst	·	6.4 km	MPC · JPL
69872	1998 SY_{70}	—	September 21, 1998	La Silla	E. W. Elst	EOS	6.2 km	MPC · JPL
69873	1998 SB_{71}	—	September 21, 1998	La Silla	E. W. Elst	EOS	8.1 km	MPC · JPL
69874	1998 SQ_{73}	—	September 21, 1998	La Silla	E. W. Elst	·	6.9 km	MPC · JPL
69875	1998 SB_{74}	—	September 21, 1998	La Silla	E. W. Elst	THM	3.3 km	MPC · JPL
69876	1998 SV_{74}	—	September 21, 1998	La Silla	E. W. Elst	HYG	6.5 km	MPC · JPL
69877	1998 SU_{79}	—	September 26, 1998	Socorro	LINEAR	·	3.4 km	MPC · JPL
69878	1998 SJ_{81}	—	September 26, 1998	Socorro	LINEAR	·	4.1 km	MPC · JPL
69879	1998 SN_{81}	—	September 26, 1998	Socorro	LINEAR	·	3.9 km	MPC · JPL
69880	1998 SQ_{81}	—	September 26, 1998	Socorro	LINEAR	KOR	4.5 km	MPC · JPL
69881	1998 SL_{91}	—	September 26, 1998	Socorro	LINEAR	·	5.1 km	MPC · JPL
69882	1998 SP_{92}	—	September 26, 1998	Socorro	LINEAR	·	7.2 km	MPC · JPL
69883	1998 SK_{98}	—	September 26, 1998	Socorro	LINEAR	·	5.6 km	MPC · JPL
69884	1998 SF_{99}	—	September 26, 1998	Socorro	LINEAR	·	5.9 km	MPC · JPL
69885	1998 SD_{100}	—	September 26, 1998	Socorro	LINEAR	·	13 km	MPC · JPL
69886	1998 SH_{100}	—	September 26, 1998	Socorro	LINEAR	EOS	6.1 km	MPC · JPL
69887	1998 SJ_{100}	—	September 26, 1998	Socorro	LINEAR	EUN	4.0 km	MPC · JPL
69888	1998 SB_{102}	—	September 26, 1998	Socorro	LINEAR	·	3.5 km	MPC · JPL
69889	1998 SU_{110}	—	September 26, 1998	Socorro	LINEAR	·	2.2 km	MPC · JPL
69890	1998 SZ_{110}	—	September 26, 1998	Socorro	LINEAR	(5)	2.5 km	MPC · JPL
69891	1998 SF_{112}	—	September 26, 1998	Socorro	LINEAR	KOR	3.7 km	MPC · JPL
69892	1998 SF_{114}	—	September 26, 1998	Socorro	LINEAR	EOS	7.1 km	MPC · JPL
69893	1998 SL_{118}	—	September 26, 1998	Socorro	LINEAR	·	5.4 km	MPC · JPL
69894	1998 SD_{125}	—	September 26, 1998	Socorro	LINEAR	EOS	5.3 km	MPC · JPL
69895	1998 SA_{126}	—	September 26, 1998	Socorro	LINEAR	·	3.4 km	MPC · JPL
69896	1998 SE_{130}	—	September 26, 1998	Socorro	LINEAR	KOR	5.0 km	MPC · JPL
69897	1998 SN_{131}	—	September 26, 1998	Socorro	LINEAR	·	5.2 km	MPC · JPL
69898	1998 SX_{134}	—	September 26, 1998	Socorro	LINEAR	GEF	4.0 km	MPC · JPL
69899	1998 SZ_{137}	—	September 26, 1998	Socorro	LINEAR	·	5.6 km	MPC · JPL
69900	1998 SN_{138}	—	September 26, 1998	Socorro	LINEAR	·	3.3 km	MPC · JPL

== 69901–70000 ==
back to top

Designation			Discovery			Properties		Ref
Permanent	Provisional	Named after	Date	Site	Discoverer(s)	Category	Diam.	Ref
69901	1998 SA_{141}	—	September 26, 1998	Socorro	LINEAR	·	3.8 km	MPC · JPL
69902	1998 SS_{141}	—	September 26, 1998	Socorro	LINEAR	EOS	3.5 km	MPC · JPL
69903	1998 SU_{142}	—	September 26, 1998	Socorro	LINEAR	EOS	7.7 km	MPC · JPL
69904	1998 SH_{143}	—	September 26, 1998	Socorro	LINEAR	HYG	8.8 km	MPC · JPL
69905	1998 SA_{146}	—	September 20, 1998	La Silla	E. W. Elst	EOS	3.8 km	MPC · JPL
69906	1998 SU_{146}	—	September 20, 1998	La Silla	E. W. Elst	·	5.9 km	MPC · JPL
69907	1998 SW_{146}	—	September 20, 1998	La Silla	E. W. Elst	·	6.6 km	MPC · JPL
69908	1998 SU_{153}	—	September 26, 1998	Socorro	LINEAR	HOF	6.4 km	MPC · JPL
69909	1998 SS_{154}	—	September 26, 1998	Socorro	LINEAR	·	5.9 km	MPC · JPL
69910	1998 SE_{155}	—	September 26, 1998	Socorro	LINEAR	·	5.1 km	MPC · JPL
69911	1998 SF_{155}	—	September 26, 1998	Socorro	LINEAR	·	5.2 km	MPC · JPL
69912	1998 SE_{156}	—	September 26, 1998	Socorro	LINEAR	·	4.6 km	MPC · JPL
69913	1998 SF_{157}	—	September 26, 1998	Socorro	LINEAR	·	8.1 km	MPC · JPL
69914	1998 ST_{158}	—	September 26, 1998	Socorro	LINEAR	·	8.5 km	MPC · JPL
69915	1998 SU_{165}	—	September 23, 1998	Catalina	CSS	H	870 m	MPC · JPL
69916	1998 SV_{166}	—	September 23, 1998	Kitt Peak	Spacewatch	·	2.9 km	MPC · JPL
69917	1998 TF	—	October 10, 1998	Oizumi	T. Kobayashi	·	12 km	MPC · JPL
69918	1998 TP_{6}	—	October 15, 1998	Reedy Creek	J. Broughton	·	6.5 km	MPC · JPL
69919	1998 TK_{9}	—	October 12, 1998	Kitt Peak	Spacewatch	HYG	9.2 km	MPC · JPL
69920	1998 TQ_{9}	—	October 12, 1998	Kitt Peak	Spacewatch	·	6.1 km	MPC · JPL
69921	1998 TM_{19}	—	October 15, 1998	Xinglong	SCAP	TEL	3.6 km	MPC · JPL
69922	1998 TF_{20}	—	October 13, 1998	Kitt Peak	Spacewatch	·	10 km	MPC · JPL
69923	1998 TR_{22}	—	October 13, 1998	Kitt Peak	Spacewatch	·	4.6 km	MPC · JPL
69924	1998 TX_{22}	—	October 13, 1998	Kitt Peak	Spacewatch	·	5.4 km	MPC · JPL
69925	1998 TU_{30}	—	October 10, 1998	Anderson Mesa	LONEOS	·	6.9 km	MPC · JPL
69926	1998 TZ_{31}	—	October 11, 1998	Anderson Mesa	LONEOS	·	5.3 km	MPC · JPL
69927	1998 TN_{32}	—	October 11, 1998	Anderson Mesa	LONEOS	·	5.0 km	MPC · JPL
69928	1998 TY_{32}	—	October 14, 1998	Anderson Mesa	LONEOS	GEF	3.8 km	MPC · JPL
69929	1998 TA_{33}	—	October 14, 1998	Anderson Mesa	LONEOS	THM	5.8 km	MPC · JPL
69930	1998 TQ_{33}	—	October 14, 1998	Anderson Mesa	LONEOS	·	5.8 km	MPC · JPL
69931	1998 UA	—	October 16, 1998	Catalina	CSS	(14916)	6.9 km	MPC · JPL
69932	1998 UK	—	October 16, 1998	Prescott	P. G. Comba	·	5.0 km	MPC · JPL
69933	1998 UA_{7}	—	October 21, 1998	Višnjan Observatory	K. Korlević	·	11 km	MPC · JPL
69934	1998 US_{13}	—	October 23, 1998	Kitt Peak	Spacewatch	KOR	3.1 km	MPC · JPL
69935	1998 UA_{17}	—	October 27, 1998	Catalina	CSS	H	1.7 km	MPC · JPL
69936	1998 UD_{17}	—	October 17, 1998	Xinglong	SCAP	EOS	5.5 km	MPC · JPL
69937	1998 UZ_{21}	—	October 28, 1998	Socorro	LINEAR	·	3.3 km	MPC · JPL
69938	1998 US_{23}	—	October 17, 1998	Anderson Mesa	LONEOS	·	4.8 km	MPC · JPL
69939	1998 UQ_{25}	—	October 18, 1998	La Silla	E. W. Elst	·	11 km	MPC · JPL
69940	1998 UD_{26}	—	October 18, 1998	La Silla	E. W. Elst	(18466)	4.2 km	MPC · JPL
69941	1998 UL_{30}	—	October 18, 1998	La Silla	E. W. Elst	EOS	5.3 km	MPC · JPL
69942	1998 UC_{31}	—	October 25, 1998	Kushiro	S. Ueda, H. Kaneda	·	7.6 km	MPC · JPL
69943	1998 UE_{34}	—	October 28, 1998	Socorro	LINEAR	·	6.4 km	MPC · JPL
69944	1998 UM_{35}	—	October 28, 1998	Socorro	LINEAR	·	4.5 km	MPC · JPL
69945	1998 UD_{38}	—	October 28, 1998	Socorro	LINEAR	·	5.8 km	MPC · JPL
69946	1998 UU_{40}	—	October 28, 1998	Socorro	LINEAR	·	3.7 km	MPC · JPL
69947	1998 UZ_{44}	—	October 20, 1998	Anderson Mesa	LONEOS	VER	6.8 km	MPC · JPL
69948	1998 VD_{2}	—	November 9, 1998	Caussols	ODAS	·	3.1 km	MPC · JPL
69949 Thierrydemange	1998 VN_{4}	Thierrydemange	November 11, 1998	Caussols	ODAS	·	8.3 km	MPC · JPL
69950	1998 VW_{4}	—	November 12, 1998	Ondřejov	L. Kotková	·	8.4 km	MPC · JPL
69951	1998 VK_{6}	—	November 11, 1998	Nachi-Katsuura	Y. Shimizu, T. Urata	·	4.9 km	MPC · JPL
69952	1998 VW_{12}	—	November 10, 1998	Socorro	LINEAR	THM	6.0 km	MPC · JPL
69953	1998 VO_{17}	—	November 10, 1998	Socorro	LINEAR	GEF	3.2 km	MPC · JPL
69954	1998 VC_{19}	—	November 10, 1998	Socorro	LINEAR	·	5.1 km	MPC · JPL
69955	1998 VK_{21}	—	November 10, 1998	Socorro	LINEAR	·	13 km	MPC · JPL
69956	1998 VP_{26}	—	November 10, 1998	Socorro	LINEAR	·	4.9 km	MPC · JPL
69957	1998 VM_{29}	—	November 10, 1998	Socorro	LINEAR	·	4.2 km	MPC · JPL
69958	1998 VP_{29}	—	November 10, 1998	Socorro	LINEAR	(1298) · fast	7.6 km	MPC · JPL
69959	1998 VM_{31}	—	November 14, 1998	Oizumi	T. Kobayashi	AEG	8.2 km	MPC · JPL
69960	1998 VN_{31}	—	November 11, 1998	Višnjan Observatory	K. Korlević	·	7.7 km	MPC · JPL
69961 Millosevich	1998 VS_{33}	Millosevich	November 15, 1998	Sormano	P. Sicoli, F. Manca	H	1.3 km	MPC · JPL
69962	1998 VX_{34}	—	November 12, 1998	Kushiro	S. Ueda, H. Kaneda	·	7.2 km	MPC · JPL
69963	1998 VP_{35}	—	November 4, 1998	Xinglong	SCAP	GEF	4.5 km	MPC · JPL
69964	1998 VM_{36}	—	November 14, 1998	Socorro	LINEAR	·	6.6 km	MPC · JPL
69965	1998 VN_{40}	—	November 14, 1998	Kitt Peak	Spacewatch	KOR	3.0 km	MPC · JPL
69966	1998 VF_{46}	—	November 15, 1998	Anderson Mesa	LONEOS	·	6.5 km	MPC · JPL
69967	1998 VS_{49}	—	November 11, 1998	Socorro	LINEAR	·	6.2 km	MPC · JPL
69968	1998 VX_{51}	—	November 13, 1998	Socorro	LINEAR	·	5.2 km	MPC · JPL
69969	1998 VX_{54}	—	November 14, 1998	Socorro	LINEAR	·	10 km	MPC · JPL
69970	1998 WV	—	November 17, 1998	Oizumi	T. Kobayashi	·	8.4 km	MPC · JPL
69971 Tanzi	1998 WD_{2}	Tanzi	November 18, 1998	Sormano	M. Cavagna	·	13 km	MPC · JPL
69972	1998 WJ_{2}	—	November 19, 1998	Farra d'Isonzo	Farra d'Isonzo	·	4.6 km	MPC · JPL
69973	1998 WO_{4}	—	November 17, 1998	Catalina	CSS	H	1.3 km	MPC · JPL
69974	1998 WH_{5}	—	November 18, 1998	Catalina	CSS	·	9.1 km	MPC · JPL
69975	1998 WU_{5}	—	November 17, 1998	Dossobuono	Lai, L.	(18466)	5.8 km	MPC · JPL
69976	1998 WD_{6}	—	November 18, 1998	Kushiro	S. Ueda, H. Kaneda	·	8.1 km	MPC · JPL
69977 Saurodonati	1998 WL_{9}	Saurodonati	November 28, 1998	Monte Agliale	Mazzoni, E., Ziboli, M.	·	7.0 km	MPC · JPL
69978	1998 WL_{10}	—	November 21, 1998	Socorro	LINEAR	·	3.5 km	MPC · JPL
69979	1998 WJ_{14}	—	November 21, 1998	Socorro	LINEAR	THM	5.5 km	MPC · JPL
69980	1998 WP_{15}	—	November 21, 1998	Socorro	LINEAR	URS	10 km	MPC · JPL
69981	1998 WE_{16}	—	November 21, 1998	Socorro	LINEAR	HYG	6.8 km	MPC · JPL
69982	1998 WY_{16}	—	November 21, 1998	Socorro	LINEAR	·	5.1 km	MPC · JPL
69983	1998 WO_{17}	—	November 21, 1998	Socorro	LINEAR	·	9.9 km	MPC · JPL
69984	1998 WG_{18}	—	November 21, 1998	Socorro	LINEAR	EOS	5.1 km	MPC · JPL
69985	1998 WV_{22}	—	November 18, 1998	Socorro	LINEAR	VER	7.9 km	MPC · JPL
69986	1998 WW_{24}	—	November 18, 1998	Kitt Peak	M. W. Buie	plutino	90 km	MPC · JPL
69987	1998 WA_{25}	—	November 19, 1998	Kitt Peak	M. W. Buie	cubewano (cold)	131 km	MPC · JPL
69988	1998 WA_{31}	—	November 18, 1998	Kitt Peak	M. W. Buie	res · 2:5	159 km	MPC · JPL
69989	1998 WK_{31}	—	November 19, 1998	Anderson Mesa	LONEOS	·	5.0 km	MPC · JPL
69990	1998 WU_{31}	—	November 18, 1998	Kitt Peak	M. W. Buie	plutino	113 km	MPC · JPL
69991	1998 WP_{32}	—	November 19, 1998	Anderson Mesa	LONEOS	·	6.5 km	MPC · JPL
69992	1998 WC_{33}	—	November 20, 1998	Anderson Mesa	LONEOS	(5651)	9.1 km	MPC · JPL
69993	1998 WS_{37}	—	November 21, 1998	Kitt Peak	Spacewatch	(1298)	7.9 km	MPC · JPL
69994	1998 WT_{37}	—	November 21, 1998	Kitt Peak	Spacewatch	·	6.8 km	MPC · JPL
69995	1998 WE_{38}	—	November 21, 1998	Kitt Peak	Spacewatch	·	4.8 km	MPC · JPL
69996	1998 WV_{40}	—	November 18, 1998	Socorro	LINEAR	EOS	5.7 km	MPC · JPL
69997	1998 WX_{40}	—	November 18, 1998	Socorro	LINEAR	·	8.5 km	MPC · JPL
69998	1998 XD	—	December 1, 1998	Xinglong	SCAP	·	3.9 km	MPC · JPL
69999	1998 XN	—	December 9, 1998	Kleť	Kleť	CYB · slow	8.4 km	MPC · JPL
70000	1998 XX_{6}	—	December 8, 1998	Kitt Peak	Spacewatch	THM	5.8 km	MPC · JPL

back to top

== See also ==
- Meanings of minor-planet names: 69001–70000
