= List of minor planets: 464001–465000 =

The following is a partial list of minor planets, running from minor-planet number 464001 through 465000, inclusive. The primary data for this and other partial lists is based on JPL's "Small-Body Orbital Elements" and data available from the Minor Planet Center. Critical list information is also provided by the MPC, unless otherwise specified from Lowell Observatory. A detailed description of the table's columns and additional sources are given on the main page including a complete list of every page in this series, and a statistical break-up on the dynamical classification of minor planets.

Also see the summary list of all named bodies in numerical and alphabetical order, and the corresponding naming citations for the number range of this particular list. New namings may only be added to this list after official publication, as the preannouncement of names is condemned by the Working Group for Small Bodies Nomenclature of the International Astronomical Union.

Near-Earth obj.	MBA (inner)	MBA (outer)	Centaur
Mars-crosser	MBA (middle)	Jupiter trojan	Trans-Neptunian obj.
Unclassified

== 464001–464100 ==
Designation			Discovery			Properties		Ref
Permanent	Provisional	Named after	Date	Site	Discoverer(s)	Category	Diam.	Ref
464001	2014 WH_{69}	—	October 15, 2004	Kitt Peak	Deep Ecliptic Survey	·	630 m	MPC · JPL
464002	2014 WQ_{72}	—	November 19, 2006	Catalina	CSS	MAR	1.4 km	MPC · JPL
464003	2014 WA_{73}	—	August 20, 2006	Palomar	NEAT	·	1.6 km	MPC · JPL
464004	2014 WE_{73}	—	March 26, 2003	Anderson Mesa	LONEOS	·	2.1 km	MPC · JPL
464005	2014 WH_{73}	—	October 1, 2003	Kitt Peak	Spacewatch	·	2.4 km	MPC · JPL
464006	2014 WW_{77}	—	August 27, 1995	Kitt Peak	Spacewatch	·	2.0 km	MPC · JPL
464007	2014 WL_{80}	—	November 16, 2009	Kitt Peak	Spacewatch	KOR	1.1 km	MPC · JPL
464008	2014 WL_{83}	—	January 28, 2011	Mount Lemmon	Mount Lemmon Survey	KOR	1.1 km	MPC · JPL
464009	2014 WL_{93}	—	December 17, 2009	Kitt Peak	Spacewatch	·	1.9 km	MPC · JPL
464010	2014 WW_{103}	—	November 25, 2005	Kitt Peak	Spacewatch	·	2.1 km	MPC · JPL
464011	2014 WE_{107}	—	January 11, 2008	Kitt Peak	Spacewatch	·	1.2 km	MPC · JPL
464012	2014 WA_{108}	—	November 12, 2010	Mount Lemmon	Mount Lemmon Survey	·	1.3 km	MPC · JPL
464013	2014 WH_{109}	—	June 15, 2010	WISE	WISE	·	1.7 km	MPC · JPL
464014	2014 WY_{117}	—	October 26, 1995	Kitt Peak	Spacewatch	SUL	1.9 km	MPC · JPL
464015	2014 WE_{119}	—	December 14, 2010	Mount Lemmon	Mount Lemmon Survey	·	2.1 km	MPC · JPL
464016	2014 WQ_{121}	—	September 28, 2003	Anderson Mesa	LONEOS	V	690 m	MPC · JPL
464017	2014 WZ_{122}	—	December 4, 2008	Mount Lemmon	Mount Lemmon Survey	·	1.1 km	MPC · JPL
464018	2014 WB_{123}	—	October 9, 2005	Kitt Peak	Spacewatch	·	1.3 km	MPC · JPL
464019	2014 WJ_{123}	—	August 25, 2004	Kitt Peak	Spacewatch	·	2.1 km	MPC · JPL
464020	2014 WP_{123}	—	March 4, 2005	Kitt Peak	Spacewatch	·	2.1 km	MPC · JPL
464021	2014 WT_{123}	—	January 29, 2011	Mount Lemmon	Mount Lemmon Survey	·	1.7 km	MPC · JPL
464022	2014 WN_{124}	—	November 8, 2009	Catalina	CSS	·	1.8 km	MPC · JPL
464023	2014 WB_{125}	—	October 22, 2005	Kitt Peak	Spacewatch	·	1.8 km	MPC · JPL
464024	2014 WH_{125}	—	April 5, 2005	Palomar	NEAT	·	2.9 km	MPC · JPL
464025	2014 WJ_{130}	—	August 28, 2000	Cerro Tololo	Deep Ecliptic Survey	·	1.4 km	MPC · JPL
464026	2014 WW_{130}	—	September 25, 2009	Kitt Peak	Spacewatch	HOF	2.4 km	MPC · JPL
464027	2014 WM_{133}	—	December 29, 2008	Kitt Peak	Spacewatch	3:2	4.9 km	MPC · JPL
464028	2014 WY_{133}	—	September 24, 2008	Mount Lemmon	Mount Lemmon Survey	·	2.4 km	MPC · JPL
464029	2014 WB_{134}	—	November 30, 2003	Kitt Peak	Spacewatch	·	2.1 km	MPC · JPL
464030	2014 WK_{135}	—	April 29, 2006	Kitt Peak	Spacewatch	·	2.8 km	MPC · JPL
464031	2014 WZ_{137}	—	February 20, 2006	Kitt Peak	Spacewatch	·	550 m	MPC · JPL
464032	2014 WS_{138}	—	October 20, 2003	Kitt Peak	Spacewatch	·	1.9 km	MPC · JPL
464033	2014 WJ_{144}	—	February 2, 2005	Kitt Peak	Spacewatch	·	1.8 km	MPC · JPL
464034	2014 WR_{158}	—	November 17, 2004	Campo Imperatore	CINEOS	·	690 m	MPC · JPL
464035	2014 WZ_{160}	—	August 27, 2009	Kitt Peak	Spacewatch	·	1.5 km	MPC · JPL
464036	2014 WO_{162}	—	December 21, 2006	Kitt Peak	Spacewatch	·	1.2 km	MPC · JPL
464037	2014 WB_{170}	—	May 21, 2006	Kitt Peak	Spacewatch	·	750 m	MPC · JPL
464038	2014 WD_{179}	—	March 20, 1999	Apache Point	SDSS	·	1.7 km	MPC · JPL
464039	2014 WN_{180}	—	December 13, 2010	Kitt Peak	Spacewatch	·	1.4 km	MPC · JPL
464040	2014 WS_{181}	—	November 11, 2010	Mount Lemmon	Mount Lemmon Survey	AEO	990 m	MPC · JPL
464041	2014 WO_{185}	—	March 26, 2003	Palomar	NEAT	ADE	2.1 km	MPC · JPL
464042	2014 WA_{186}	—	September 14, 2006	Catalina	CSS	·	1.3 km	MPC · JPL
464043	2014 WW_{193}	—	September 29, 2003	Anderson Mesa	LONEOS	·	2.0 km	MPC · JPL
464044	2014 WL_{194}	—	October 10, 2008	Mount Lemmon	Mount Lemmon Survey	EOS	1.8 km	MPC · JPL
464045	2014 WT_{198}	—	April 27, 2011	Kitt Peak	Spacewatch	·	2.5 km	MPC · JPL
464046	2014 WK_{200}	—	February 28, 2009	Kitt Peak	Spacewatch	T_{j} (2.99) · 3:2	7.4 km	MPC · JPL
464047	2014 WC_{210}	—	February 26, 2012	Mount Lemmon	Mount Lemmon Survey	·	1.1 km	MPC · JPL
464048	2014 WH_{211}	—	October 8, 2004	Kitt Peak	Spacewatch	·	1.9 km	MPC · JPL
464049	2014 WV_{212}	—	April 29, 2011	Mount Lemmon	Mount Lemmon Survey	·	2.4 km	MPC · JPL
464050	2014 WQ_{214}	—	December 31, 2008	Mount Lemmon	Mount Lemmon Survey	CYB	3.8 km	MPC · JPL
464051	2014 WO_{218}	—	December 11, 2009	Mount Lemmon	Mount Lemmon Survey	·	2.1 km	MPC · JPL
464052	2014 WW_{219}	—	December 6, 2005	Kitt Peak	Spacewatch	·	1.3 km	MPC · JPL
464053	2014 WL_{220}	—	April 1, 2008	Kitt Peak	Spacewatch	·	1.3 km	MPC · JPL
464054	2014 WO_{224}	—	January 25, 2006	Kitt Peak	Spacewatch	KOR	1.1 km	MPC · JPL
464055	2014 WP_{227}	—	March 8, 2008	Kitt Peak	Spacewatch	·	1.6 km	MPC · JPL
464056	2014 WG_{232}	—	June 10, 2012	Mount Lemmon	Mount Lemmon Survey	EOS	1.6 km	MPC · JPL
464057	2014 WL_{232}	—	March 19, 2010	WISE	WISE	·	3.5 km	MPC · JPL
464058	2014 WU_{232}	—	November 10, 2010	Kitt Peak	Spacewatch	·	1.4 km	MPC · JPL
464059	2014 WG_{233}	—	August 23, 2003	Cerro Tololo	Deep Ecliptic Survey	·	2.0 km	MPC · JPL
464060	2014 WW_{235}	—	March 18, 2010	WISE	WISE	·	2.5 km	MPC · JPL
464061	2014 WC_{237}	—	October 23, 2009	Mount Lemmon	Mount Lemmon Survey	·	2.1 km	MPC · JPL
464062	2014 WU_{239}	—	September 23, 2009	Mount Lemmon	Mount Lemmon Survey	AGN	990 m	MPC · JPL
464063	2014 WP_{249}	—	January 17, 2007	Kitt Peak	Spacewatch	·	1.6 km	MPC · JPL
464064	2014 WU_{250}	—	September 17, 2004	Kitt Peak	Spacewatch	·	1.7 km	MPC · JPL
464065	2014 WK_{253}	—	February 2, 2008	Kitt Peak	Spacewatch	·	1.1 km	MPC · JPL
464066	2014 WK_{254}	—	April 6, 2011	Mount Lemmon	Mount Lemmon Survey	·	2.7 km	MPC · JPL
464067	2014 WW_{259}	—	January 24, 2007	Mount Lemmon	Mount Lemmon Survey	·	1.3 km	MPC · JPL
464068	2014 WB_{269}	—	April 14, 2007	Kitt Peak	Spacewatch	·	2.2 km	MPC · JPL
464069	2014 WJ_{269}	—	September 6, 2008	Mount Lemmon	Mount Lemmon Survey	·	2.2 km	MPC · JPL
464070	2014 WT_{270}	—	April 28, 2010	WISE	WISE	·	3.9 km	MPC · JPL
464071	2014 WR_{271}	—	December 6, 2010	Mount Lemmon	Mount Lemmon Survey	·	1.5 km	MPC · JPL
464072	2014 WM_{273}	—	December 1, 2005	Kitt Peak	Spacewatch	MRX	990 m	MPC · JPL
464073	2014 WZ_{274}	—	April 3, 2008	Mount Lemmon	Mount Lemmon Survey	·	1.2 km	MPC · JPL
464074	2014 WX_{275}	—	March 6, 2008	Catalina	CSS	EUN	1.6 km	MPC · JPL
464075	2014 WS_{286}	—	November 10, 2009	Mount Lemmon	Mount Lemmon Survey	INA	2.6 km	MPC · JPL
464076	2014 WF_{294}	—	August 28, 2005	Kitt Peak	Spacewatch	·	1.3 km	MPC · JPL
464077	2014 WG_{294}	—	January 10, 2003	Socorro	LINEAR	·	2.1 km	MPC · JPL
464078	2014 WJ_{296}	—	March 9, 2011	Mount Lemmon	Mount Lemmon Survey	EOS	1.9 km	MPC · JPL
464079	2014 WB_{297}	—	April 29, 2011	Mount Lemmon	Mount Lemmon Survey	·	2.4 km	MPC · JPL
464080	2014 WB_{298}	—	March 2, 2006	Kitt Peak	Spacewatch	·	4.3 km	MPC · JPL
464081	2014 WJ_{301}	—	December 9, 2002	Bergisch Gladbach	W. Bickel	EUN	1.4 km	MPC · JPL
464082	2014 WH_{302}	—	December 14, 2010	Mount Lemmon	Mount Lemmon Survey	·	2.1 km	MPC · JPL
464083	2014 WD_{308}	—	June 8, 2013	Mount Lemmon	Mount Lemmon Survey	·	1.8 km	MPC · JPL
464084	2014 WJ_{314}	—	December 3, 2007	Kitt Peak	Spacewatch	V	780 m	MPC · JPL
464085	2014 WF_{319}	—	November 2, 2010	Mount Lemmon	Mount Lemmon Survey	·	1.1 km	MPC · JPL
464086	2014 WN_{319}	—	January 28, 2011	Catalina	CSS	·	2.3 km	MPC · JPL
464087	2014 WB_{327}	—	March 28, 2011	Mount Lemmon	Mount Lemmon Survey	·	2.1 km	MPC · JPL
464088	2014 WG_{327}	—	May 1, 2012	Mount Lemmon	Mount Lemmon Survey	·	1.2 km	MPC · JPL
464089	2014 WT_{331}	—	February 28, 2008	Mount Lemmon	Mount Lemmon Survey	·	960 m	MPC · JPL
464090	2014 WP_{334}	—	September 12, 2007	Mount Lemmon	Mount Lemmon Survey	·	670 m	MPC · JPL
464091	2014 WM_{348}	—	August 13, 2010	Kitt Peak	Spacewatch	V	600 m	MPC · JPL
464092	2014 WC_{350}	—	August 7, 2008	Kitt Peak	Spacewatch	·	2.3 km	MPC · JPL
464093	2014 WK_{350}	—	November 30, 2005	Anderson Mesa	LONEOS	·	1.9 km	MPC · JPL
464094	2014 WP_{352}	—	January 30, 2012	Mount Lemmon	Mount Lemmon Survey	·	940 m	MPC · JPL
464095	2014 WJ_{384}	—	February 7, 2002	Palomar	NEAT	·	2.0 km	MPC · JPL
464096	2014 WU_{391}	—	March 27, 2012	Mount Lemmon	Mount Lemmon Survey	·	1.7 km	MPC · JPL
464097	2014 WU_{393}	—	January 23, 2011	Mount Lemmon	Mount Lemmon Survey	BRA	1.4 km	MPC · JPL
464098	2014 WY_{393}	—	July 16, 2010	WISE	WISE	·	2.0 km	MPC · JPL
464099	2014 WA_{394}	—	January 17, 2007	Kitt Peak	Spacewatch	·	1.4 km	MPC · JPL
464100	2014 WL_{402}	—	February 11, 2000	Kitt Peak	Spacewatch	·	1.5 km	MPC · JPL

== 464101–464200 ==
back to top

Designation			Discovery			Properties		Ref
Permanent	Provisional	Named after	Date	Site	Discoverer(s)	Category	Diam.	Ref
464101	2014 WL_{407}	—	November 17, 2009	Mount Lemmon	Mount Lemmon Survey	·	3.3 km	MPC · JPL
464102	2014 WV_{407}	—	February 21, 2003	Palomar	NEAT	(5)	1.6 km	MPC · JPL
464103	2014 WN_{408}	—	September 28, 2003	Anderson Mesa	LONEOS	·	2.3 km	MPC · JPL
464104	2014 WP_{411}	—	October 21, 2008	Kitt Peak	Spacewatch	·	3.5 km	MPC · JPL
464105	2014 WV_{421}	—	November 9, 2009	Catalina	CSS	·	2.2 km	MPC · JPL
464106	2014 WM_{424}	—	September 28, 2013	Kitt Peak	Spacewatch	·	2.7 km	MPC · JPL
464107	2014 WA_{428}	—	December 20, 2009	Mount Lemmon	Mount Lemmon Survey	·	2.7 km	MPC · JPL
464108	2014 WU_{434}	—	March 16, 2002	Kitt Peak	Spacewatch	·	1.8 km	MPC · JPL
464109	2014 WH_{435}	—	December 24, 2005	Catalina	CSS	·	2.1 km	MPC · JPL
464110	2014 WV_{447}	—	February 7, 2011	Mount Lemmon	Mount Lemmon Survey	HOF	2.0 km	MPC · JPL
464111	2014 WH_{449}	—	October 25, 2005	Kitt Peak	Spacewatch	WIT	970 m	MPC · JPL
464112	2014 WW_{454}	—	November 1, 2010	Mount Lemmon	Mount Lemmon Survey	·	2.1 km	MPC · JPL
464113	2014 WN_{455}	—	October 26, 2009	Mount Lemmon	Mount Lemmon Survey	·	2.7 km	MPC · JPL
464114	2014 WT_{458}	—	December 6, 2005	Kitt Peak	Spacewatch	·	1.8 km	MPC · JPL
464115	2014 WE_{459}	—	October 10, 2007	Kitt Peak	Spacewatch	·	810 m	MPC · JPL
464116	2014 WF_{459}	—	August 30, 2005	Kitt Peak	Spacewatch	·	1.3 km	MPC · JPL
464117	2014 WG_{465}	—	December 1, 2003	Kitt Peak	Spacewatch	·	1.3 km	MPC · JPL
464118	2014 WC_{468}	—	February 6, 2007	Kitt Peak	Spacewatch	3:2	5.0 km	MPC · JPL
464119	2014 WJ_{468}	—	October 16, 2007	Catalina	CSS	·	4.3 km	MPC · JPL
464120	2014 WX_{469}	—	October 9, 2008	Mount Lemmon	Mount Lemmon Survey	EOS	2.1 km	MPC · JPL
464121	2014 WG_{470}	—	October 9, 2008	Mount Lemmon	Mount Lemmon Survey	·	2.8 km	MPC · JPL
464122	2014 WZ_{470}	—	November 26, 2009	Kitt Peak	Spacewatch	·	2.6 km	MPC · JPL
464123	2014 WZ_{475}	—	April 24, 2006	Kitt Peak	Spacewatch	·	2.5 km	MPC · JPL
464124	2014 WD_{478}	—	April 30, 2005	Kitt Peak	Spacewatch	·	3.8 km	MPC · JPL
464125	2014 WO_{486}	—	October 1, 2005	Mount Lemmon	Mount Lemmon Survey	·	1.6 km	MPC · JPL
464126	2014 WK_{488}	—	September 5, 2008	Kitt Peak	Spacewatch	·	2.0 km	MPC · JPL
464127	2014 WG_{490}	—	February 2, 2005	Kitt Peak	Spacewatch	·	2.9 km	MPC · JPL
464128	2014 WV_{492}	—	September 10, 2007	Mount Lemmon	Mount Lemmon Survey	·	2.9 km	MPC · JPL
464129	2014 WC_{493}	—	July 28, 2013	Kitt Peak	Spacewatch	·	3.2 km	MPC · JPL
464130	2014 WG_{495}	—	April 6, 2011	Mount Lemmon	Mount Lemmon Survey	·	2.5 km	MPC · JPL
464131	2014 WH_{497}	—	November 12, 2001	Socorro	LINEAR	·	2.4 km	MPC · JPL
464132	2014 WP_{498}	—	May 8, 2005	Mount Lemmon	Mount Lemmon Survey	·	1.5 km	MPC · JPL
464133	2014 WY_{498}	—	November 5, 2010	Mount Lemmon	Mount Lemmon Survey	·	1.5 km	MPC · JPL
464134	2014 WF_{503}	—	May 7, 2008	Mount Lemmon	Mount Lemmon Survey	·	2.2 km	MPC · JPL
464135	2014 WK_{504}	—	December 12, 2010	Socorro	LINEAR	EUN	1.1 km	MPC · JPL
464136	2014 WV_{504}	—	September 26, 2003	Palomar	NEAT	·	3.0 km	MPC · JPL
464137	2014 WA_{506}	—	November 14, 2003	Palomar	NEAT	·	3.2 km	MPC · JPL
464138	2014 XC_{1}	—	December 31, 2002	Anderson Mesa	LONEOS	·	1.9 km	MPC · JPL
464139	2014 XO_{1}	—	February 26, 2012	Mount Lemmon	Mount Lemmon Survey	·	1.5 km	MPC · JPL
464140	2014 XU_{2}	—	March 30, 2003	Kitt Peak	Spacewatch	·	1.5 km	MPC · JPL
464141	2014 XW_{4}	—	October 6, 2008	Mount Lemmon	Mount Lemmon Survey	·	2.8 km	MPC · JPL
464142	2014 XD_{5}	—	October 10, 2005	Kitt Peak	Spacewatch	·	2.1 km	MPC · JPL
464143	2014 XK_{12}	—	November 4, 2007	Kitt Peak	Spacewatch	·	920 m	MPC · JPL
464144	2014 XC_{16}	—	January 10, 2007	Kitt Peak	Spacewatch	·	1.2 km	MPC · JPL
464145	2014 XF_{19}	—	March 4, 2008	Kitt Peak	Spacewatch	·	1.5 km	MPC · JPL
464146	2014 XJ_{26}	—	November 21, 2009	Mount Lemmon	Mount Lemmon Survey	·	2.5 km	MPC · JPL
464147	2014 XX_{27}	—	November 14, 2001	Kitt Peak	Spacewatch	·	1.4 km	MPC · JPL
464148	2014 XY_{29}	—	November 17, 1995	Kitt Peak	Spacewatch	·	2.0 km	MPC · JPL
464149	2014 YF_{5}	—	June 23, 2012	Mount Lemmon	Mount Lemmon Survey	EOS	2.5 km	MPC · JPL
464150 Kresken	2014 YN_{5}	Kresken	November 18, 2009	Mount Lemmon	Mount Lemmon Survey	·	3.2 km	MPC · JPL
464151	2014 YB_{10}	—	October 21, 2006	Mount Lemmon	Mount Lemmon Survey	·	1.9 km	MPC · JPL
464152	2014 YF_{22}	—	January 16, 2004	Kitt Peak	Spacewatch	·	3.0 km	MPC · JPL
464153	2014 YO_{22}	—	September 3, 2013	Kitt Peak	Spacewatch	·	2.8 km	MPC · JPL
464154	2014 YN_{25}	—	September 24, 2005	Kitt Peak	Spacewatch	·	1.4 km	MPC · JPL
464155	2014 YW_{35}	—	October 7, 2005	Kitt Peak	Spacewatch	·	1.3 km	MPC · JPL
464156	2014 YK_{36}	—	October 6, 2004	Kitt Peak	Spacewatch	HOF	2.7 km	MPC · JPL
464157	2014 YE_{38}	—	November 7, 2008	Mount Lemmon	Mount Lemmon Survey	·	3.1 km	MPC · JPL
464158	2014 YW_{48}	—	December 10, 2010	Mount Lemmon	Mount Lemmon Survey	·	1.9 km	MPC · JPL
464159	2015 AC_{1}	—	December 10, 2010	Mount Lemmon	Mount Lemmon Survey	·	1.8 km	MPC · JPL
464160	2015 AQ_{1}	—	November 15, 1995	Kitt Peak	Spacewatch	CYB	5.8 km	MPC · JPL
464161	2015 AE_{2}	—	March 27, 2011	Mount Lemmon	Mount Lemmon Survey	·	2.8 km	MPC · JPL
464162	2015 AQ_{17}	—	April 21, 2006	Kitt Peak	Spacewatch	·	4.2 km	MPC · JPL
464163	2015 AB_{27}	—	May 8, 2010	Mount Lemmon	Mount Lemmon Survey	·	3.2 km	MPC · JPL
464164	2015 AF_{27}	—	March 12, 2005	Socorro	LINEAR	·	1.3 km	MPC · JPL
464165	2015 AB_{29}	—	January 15, 2004	Kitt Peak	Spacewatch	·	3.5 km	MPC · JPL
464166	2015 AT_{30}	—	May 11, 2005	Palomar	NEAT	T_{j} (2.98)	3.7 km	MPC · JPL
464167	2015 AL_{31}	—	December 20, 2004	Mount Lemmon	Mount Lemmon Survey	EOS	2.0 km	MPC · JPL
464168	2015 AC_{38}	—	October 11, 1999	Kitt Peak	Spacewatch	·	2.1 km	MPC · JPL
464169	2015 AL_{46}	—	October 20, 2003	Kitt Peak	Spacewatch	THM	2.3 km	MPC · JPL
464170	2015 AA_{57}	—	September 20, 2003	Palomar	NEAT	·	1.0 km	MPC · JPL
464171	2015 AA_{63}	—	March 12, 2002	Kitt Peak	Spacewatch	AGN	1.4 km	MPC · JPL
464172	2015 AM_{64}	—	January 21, 2006	Mount Lemmon	Mount Lemmon Survey	HOF	3.1 km	MPC · JPL
464173	2015 AS_{94}	—	November 21, 2009	Mount Lemmon	Mount Lemmon Survey	·	3.4 km	MPC · JPL
464174	2015 AN_{126}	—	February 13, 2004	Kitt Peak	Spacewatch	·	4.7 km	MPC · JPL
464175	2015 AT_{136}	—	January 28, 2006	Kitt Peak	Spacewatch	AGN	1.5 km	MPC · JPL
464176	2015 AN_{140}	—	July 28, 2008	Siding Spring	SSS	·	1.7 km	MPC · JPL
464177	2015 AX_{162}	—	March 16, 2010	Catalina	CSS	T_{j} (2.98)	3.7 km	MPC · JPL
464178	2015 AH_{169}	—	February 27, 2006	Kitt Peak	Spacewatch	·	1.9 km	MPC · JPL
464179	2015 AV_{178}	—	January 15, 2004	Kitt Peak	Spacewatch	·	4.7 km	MPC · JPL
464180	2015 AA_{179}	—	September 12, 2001	Socorro	LINEAR	·	1.2 km	MPC · JPL
464181	2015 AT_{203}	—	December 18, 2003	Kitt Peak	Spacewatch	·	4.0 km	MPC · JPL
464182	2015 AL_{207}	—	October 28, 2005	Catalina	CSS	·	1.8 km	MPC · JPL
464183	2015 AQ_{230}	—	September 18, 1995	Kitt Peak	Spacewatch	VER	2.8 km	MPC · JPL
464184	2015 AR_{250}	—	March 14, 2007	Kitt Peak	Spacewatch	·	2.5 km	MPC · JPL
464185	2015 AX_{250}	—	May 10, 2007	Kitt Peak	Spacewatch	·	2.9 km	MPC · JPL
464186	2015 AO_{269}	—	December 31, 1997	Kitt Peak	Spacewatch	·	4.5 km	MPC · JPL
464187	2015 AN_{274}	—	September 27, 2003	Apache Point	SDSS	·	2.0 km	MPC · JPL
464188	2015 BU_{1}	—	March 13, 2008	Kitt Peak	Spacewatch	3:2	4.2 km	MPC · JPL
464189	2015 BW_{1}	—	September 16, 2013	Mount Lemmon	Mount Lemmon Survey	·	3.6 km	MPC · JPL
464190	2015 BB_{10}	—	September 14, 2007	Catalina	CSS	·	4.5 km	MPC · JPL
464191	2015 BF_{10}	—	March 27, 1995	Kitt Peak	Spacewatch	·	920 m	MPC · JPL
464192	2015 BJ_{10}	—	October 22, 2003	Apache Point	SDSS	·	1.9 km	MPC · JPL
464193	2015 BY_{16}	—	January 19, 2004	Kitt Peak	Spacewatch	EOS	2.0 km	MPC · JPL
464194	2015 BD_{19}	—	April 5, 2000	Socorro	LINEAR	·	2.9 km	MPC · JPL
464195	2015 BZ_{31}	—	September 15, 2013	Mount Lemmon	Mount Lemmon Survey	·	3.4 km	MPC · JPL
464196	2015 BN_{37}	—	October 25, 2008	Mount Lemmon	Mount Lemmon Survey	·	2.9 km	MPC · JPL
464197	2015 BJ_{38}	—	April 15, 2004	Kitt Peak	Spacewatch	·	1.9 km	MPC · JPL
464198	2015 BN_{38}	—	September 30, 2000	Socorro	LINEAR	ADE	2.4 km	MPC · JPL
464199	2015 BO_{42}	—	February 7, 2003	Palomar	NEAT	·	1.2 km	MPC · JPL
464200	2015 BN_{67}	—	September 27, 2009	Mount Lemmon	Mount Lemmon Survey	·	1.8 km	MPC · JPL

== 464201–464300 ==
back to top

Designation			Discovery			Properties		Ref
Permanent	Provisional	Named after	Date	Site	Discoverer(s)	Category	Diam.	Ref
464201	2015 BU_{82}	—	October 8, 2007	Catalina	CSS	·	3.5 km	MPC · JPL
464202	2015 BW_{83}	—	February 25, 2006	Kitt Peak	Spacewatch	·	1.9 km	MPC · JPL
464203	2015 BC_{87}	—	May 23, 2006	Kitt Peak	Spacewatch	EOS	1.8 km	MPC · JPL
464204	2015 BF_{87}	—	September 10, 2007	Mount Lemmon	Mount Lemmon Survey	·	3.1 km	MPC · JPL
464205	2015 BO_{100}	—	March 20, 2010	Mount Lemmon	Mount Lemmon Survey	EOS	3.8 km	MPC · JPL
464206	2015 BE_{116}	—	October 6, 2005	Mount Lemmon	Mount Lemmon Survey	3:2	4.3 km	MPC · JPL
464207	2015 BF_{117}	—	September 3, 2002	Palomar	NEAT	·	4.0 km	MPC · JPL
464208	2015 BO_{123}	—	August 30, 2006	Anderson Mesa	LONEOS	·	5.1 km	MPC · JPL
464209	2015 BL_{126}	—	April 6, 2005	Mount Lemmon	Mount Lemmon Survey	·	2.3 km	MPC · JPL
464210	2015 BJ_{162}	—	November 16, 2009	Mount Lemmon	Mount Lemmon Survey	·	1.6 km	MPC · JPL
464211	2015 BW_{165}	—	December 24, 2006	Mount Lemmon	Mount Lemmon Survey	3:2 · SHU	5.0 km	MPC · JPL
464212	2015 BO_{169}	—	September 12, 2007	Mount Lemmon	Mount Lemmon Survey	THM	2.2 km	MPC · JPL
464213	2015 BD_{171}	—	February 7, 2011	Mount Lemmon	Mount Lemmon Survey	·	1.2 km	MPC · JPL
464214	2015 BG_{204}	—	September 7, 2008	Mount Lemmon	Mount Lemmon Survey	·	1.7 km	MPC · JPL
464215	2015 BQ_{207}	—	January 14, 2002	Socorro	LINEAR	·	2.4 km	MPC · JPL
464216	2015 BM_{208}	—	December 1, 2003	Kitt Peak	Spacewatch	·	2.5 km	MPC · JPL
464217	2015 BK_{209}	—	October 23, 2009	Mount Lemmon	Mount Lemmon Survey	EOS	2.7 km	MPC · JPL
464218	2015 BQ_{214}	—	October 4, 2005	Mount Lemmon	Mount Lemmon Survey	·	1.4 km	MPC · JPL
464219	2015 BF_{218}	—	September 10, 2007	Mount Lemmon	Mount Lemmon Survey	·	2.5 km	MPC · JPL
464220	2015 BK_{221}	—	January 10, 2006	Mount Lemmon	Mount Lemmon Survey	·	2.2 km	MPC · JPL
464221	2015 BX_{225}	—	February 14, 2010	Mount Lemmon	Mount Lemmon Survey	·	3.9 km	MPC · JPL
464222	2015 BW_{233}	—	May 27, 2006	Catalina	CSS	·	4.1 km	MPC · JPL
464223	2015 BB_{242}	—	November 30, 2005	Mount Lemmon	Mount Lemmon Survey	·	2.0 km	MPC · JPL
464224	2015 BP_{242}	—	April 19, 2006	Kitt Peak	Spacewatch	·	2.0 km	MPC · JPL
464225	2015 BA_{243}	—	February 19, 2010	Mount Lemmon	Mount Lemmon Survey	·	2.9 km	MPC · JPL
464226	2015 BZ_{264}	—	November 11, 2001	Apache Point	SDSS	·	1.0 km	MPC · JPL
464227	2015 BH_{286}	—	April 20, 2007	Mount Lemmon	Mount Lemmon Survey	·	3.5 km	MPC · JPL
464228	2015 BX_{296}	—	November 27, 2009	Mount Lemmon	Mount Lemmon Survey	·	2.8 km	MPC · JPL
464229	2015 BN_{320}	—	August 23, 2007	Kitt Peak	Spacewatch	EOS	2.3 km	MPC · JPL
464230	2015 BK_{326}	—	September 13, 2007	Mount Lemmon	Mount Lemmon Survey	·	3.1 km	MPC · JPL
464231	2015 BQ_{348}	—	September 22, 2003	Palomar	NEAT	·	4.3 km	MPC · JPL
464232	2015 BC_{360}	—	February 7, 2002	Kitt Peak	Spacewatch	·	2.3 km	MPC · JPL
464233	2015 BK_{373}	—	November 28, 2005	Mount Lemmon	Mount Lemmon Survey	·	1.7 km	MPC · JPL
464234	2015 BL_{412}	—	August 8, 2004	Socorro	LINEAR	·	1.5 km	MPC · JPL
464235	2015 BY_{449}	—	January 19, 1994	Kitt Peak	Spacewatch	·	2.1 km	MPC · JPL
464236	2015 BJ_{511}	—	September 15, 2006	Kitt Peak	Spacewatch	·	3.8 km	MPC · JPL
464237	2015 CO_{1}	—	June 1, 2010	WISE	WISE	·	3.4 km	MPC · JPL
464238	2015 CK_{5}	—	October 15, 2007	Mount Lemmon	Mount Lemmon Survey	·	3.5 km	MPC · JPL
464239	2015 CR_{10}	—	January 15, 1996	Kitt Peak	Spacewatch	CYB	4.2 km	MPC · JPL
464240	2015 CN_{20}	—	March 13, 2010	Mount Lemmon	Mount Lemmon Survey	HYG	2.5 km	MPC · JPL
464241	2015 CY_{20}	—	August 13, 2006	Palomar	NEAT	·	4.4 km	MPC · JPL
464242	2015 DU_{13}	—	November 13, 1996	Kitt Peak	Spacewatch	THM	3.2 km	MPC · JPL
464243	2015 DG_{65}	—	March 3, 2006	Mount Lemmon	Mount Lemmon Survey	·	2.1 km	MPC · JPL
464244	2015 DB_{100}	—	December 16, 2009	Mount Lemmon	Mount Lemmon Survey	HOF	3.3 km	MPC · JPL
464245	2015 DR_{109}	—	October 23, 1997	Kitt Peak	Spacewatch	EOS	2.0 km	MPC · JPL
464246	2015 DY_{114}	—	January 1, 2009	Mount Lemmon	Mount Lemmon Survey	·	3.3 km	MPC · JPL
464247	2015 DW_{142}	—	November 30, 1999	Kitt Peak	Spacewatch	V	770 m	MPC · JPL
464248	2015 DJ_{143}	—	December 22, 2003	Kitt Peak	Spacewatch	·	2.9 km	MPC · JPL
464249	2015 DH_{148}	—	March 12, 2010	Mount Lemmon	Mount Lemmon Survey	VER	2.6 km	MPC · JPL
464250	2015 DQ_{149}	—	March 9, 2005	Kitt Peak	Spacewatch	·	2.5 km	MPC · JPL
464251	2015 DF_{150}	—	November 1, 2006	Mount Lemmon	Mount Lemmon Survey	3:2	6.0 km	MPC · JPL
464252	2015 DG_{150}	—	September 9, 2007	Kitt Peak	Spacewatch	·	3.2 km	MPC · JPL
464253	2015 DV_{156}	—	December 10, 2005	Kitt Peak	Spacewatch	·	2.3 km	MPC · JPL
464254	2015 DH_{193}	—	November 6, 2008	Kitt Peak	Spacewatch	EOS	2.3 km	MPC · JPL
464255	2015 DP_{216}	—	September 11, 2007	Mount Lemmon	Mount Lemmon Survey	EOS	2.2 km	MPC · JPL
464256	2015 EN_{1}	—	March 19, 2010	Kitt Peak	Spacewatch	·	3.2 km	MPC · JPL
464257	2015 EY_{11}	—	August 12, 2007	XuYi	PMO NEO Survey Program	EOS	2.3 km	MPC · JPL
464258	2015 FB_{2}	—	November 29, 2003	Kitt Peak	Spacewatch	EOS	1.8 km	MPC · JPL
464259	2015 FM_{2}	—	December 2, 2008	Mount Lemmon	Mount Lemmon Survey	·	3.3 km	MPC · JPL
464260	2015 FR_{2}	—	April 14, 2005	Kitt Peak	Spacewatch	EOS	2.6 km	MPC · JPL
464261	2015 FE_{3}	—	December 21, 2008	Mount Lemmon	Mount Lemmon Survey	·	3.0 km	MPC · JPL
464262	2015 FW_{6}	—	March 20, 2010	Mount Lemmon	Mount Lemmon Survey	·	3.9 km	MPC · JPL
464263	2015 FE_{53}	—	March 3, 2000	Kitt Peak	Spacewatch	·	1.6 km	MPC · JPL
464264	2015 FW_{118}	—	December 8, 2004	Socorro	LINEAR	·	3.0 km	MPC · JPL
464265	2015 FT_{125}	—	October 5, 2002	Kitt Peak	Spacewatch	·	2.4 km	MPC · JPL
464266	2015 FK_{127}	—	September 18, 2007	Catalina	CSS	·	3.2 km	MPC · JPL
464267	2015 FJ_{137}	—	August 22, 2003	Palomar	NEAT	·	2.7 km	MPC · JPL
464268	2015 FV_{140}	—	September 17, 2009	Kitt Peak	Spacewatch	L4 · 006	10 km	MPC · JPL
464269	2015 LC_{32}	—	December 17, 2012	Kislovodsk	ISON-Kislovodsk Observatory	·	1.8 km	MPC · JPL
464270	2015 RB_{31}	—	September 28, 2008	Mount Lemmon	Mount Lemmon Survey	·	800 m	MPC · JPL
464271	2015 TO_{67}	—	September 17, 1996	Haleakala	NEAT	·	980 m	MPC · JPL
464272	2015 UC_{66}	—	February 23, 1998	Kitt Peak	Spacewatch	(18466)	2.0 km	MPC · JPL
464273	2015 WU_{2}	—	January 19, 1996	Xinglong	SCAP	·	1.4 km	MPC · JPL
464274	2015 WD_{10}	—	May 8, 2008	Kitt Peak	Spacewatch	·	2.9 km	MPC · JPL
464275	2015 XG_{168}	—	March 6, 1994	Kitt Peak	Spacewatch	·	3.4 km	MPC · JPL
464276	2015 XW_{245}	—	October 25, 2005	Mount Lemmon	Mount Lemmon Survey	GEF	1.3 km	MPC · JPL
464277	2015 XY_{383}	—	January 13, 2005	Catalina	CSS	·	4.8 km	MPC · JPL
464278	2015 YH_{4}	—	June 27, 2001	Anderson Mesa	LONEOS	H	700 m	MPC · JPL
464279	2015 YY_{4}	—	February 7, 2010	WISE	WISE	·	2.7 km	MPC · JPL
464280	2015 YA_{9}	—	April 1, 2008	Mount Lemmon	Mount Lemmon Survey	·	1.6 km	MPC · JPL
464281	2015 YJ_{9}	—	February 1, 2005	Kitt Peak	Spacewatch	THM	2.9 km	MPC · JPL
464282	2016 AU_{1}	—	April 28, 2004	Kitt Peak	Spacewatch	·	1.8 km	MPC · JPL
464283	2016 AR_{26}	—	January 7, 2006	Mount Lemmon	Mount Lemmon Survey	EOS	1.6 km	MPC · JPL
464284	2016 AA_{45}	—	October 8, 2005	Kitt Peak	Spacewatch	·	2.0 km	MPC · JPL
464285	2016 AT_{54}	—	March 2, 2006	Mount Lemmon	Mount Lemmon Survey	·	3.4 km	MPC · JPL
464286	2016 AB_{73}	—	March 8, 2005	Mount Lemmon	Mount Lemmon Survey	·	3.3 km	MPC · JPL
464287	2016 AK_{73}	—	May 2, 2006	Mount Lemmon	Mount Lemmon Survey	·	2.4 km	MPC · JPL
464288	2016 AV_{73}	—	January 13, 2005	Kitt Peak	Spacewatch	·	2.7 km	MPC · JPL
464289	2016 AP_{74}	—	September 24, 2008	Mount Lemmon	Mount Lemmon Survey	·	2.6 km	MPC · JPL
464290	2016 AH_{75}	—	September 3, 2013	Haleakala	Pan-STARRS 1	EOS	1.7 km	MPC · JPL
464291	2016 AZ_{75}	—	October 19, 2011	Mount Lemmon	Mount Lemmon Survey	·	710 m	MPC · JPL
464292	2016 AG_{78}	—	February 9, 2007	Kitt Peak	Spacewatch	·	2.1 km	MPC · JPL
464293	2016 AE_{79}	—	October 3, 2003	Kitt Peak	Spacewatch	·	1.2 km	MPC · JPL
464294	2016 AL_{93}	—	December 26, 2011	Kitt Peak	Spacewatch	·	1.2 km	MPC · JPL
464295	2016 AS_{94}	—	April 7, 2010	WISE	WISE	·	4.2 km	MPC · JPL
464296	2016 AR_{95}	—	December 28, 2007	Kitt Peak	Spacewatch	·	1.4 km	MPC · JPL
464297	2016 AV_{95}	—	March 2, 2006	Kitt Peak	Spacewatch	·	580 m	MPC · JPL
464298	2016 AA_{98}	—	September 15, 2009	Kitt Peak	Spacewatch	·	1.7 km	MPC · JPL
464299	2016 AP_{98}	—	December 13, 2006	Socorro	LINEAR	·	1.5 km	MPC · JPL
464300	2016 AT_{98}	—	April 8, 2003	Kitt Peak	Spacewatch	·	1.3 km	MPC · JPL

== 464301–464400 ==
back to top

Designation			Discovery			Properties		Ref
Permanent	Provisional	Named after	Date	Site	Discoverer(s)	Category	Diam.	Ref
464301	2016 AR_{99}	—	November 11, 2009	Mount Lemmon	Mount Lemmon Survey	·	1.4 km	MPC · JPL
464302	2016 AD_{100}	—	December 25, 2005	Kitt Peak	Spacewatch	·	1.7 km	MPC · JPL
464303	2016 AG_{100}	—	November 3, 2005	Mount Lemmon	Mount Lemmon Survey	·	2.2 km	MPC · JPL
464304	2016 AU_{100}	—	November 9, 2009	Catalina	CSS	·	3.2 km	MPC · JPL
464305	2016 AY_{100}	—	December 3, 2010	Kitt Peak	Spacewatch	·	1.8 km	MPC · JPL
464306	2016 AG_{101}	—	September 12, 2002	Palomar	NEAT	·	890 m	MPC · JPL
464307	2016 AG_{102}	—	January 26, 2006	Kitt Peak	Spacewatch	·	2.2 km	MPC · JPL
464308	2016 AC_{103}	—	November 1, 2005	Mount Lemmon	Mount Lemmon Survey	PAD	1.5 km	MPC · JPL
464309	2016 AX_{103}	—	December 4, 2005	Kitt Peak	Spacewatch	·	2.6 km	MPC · JPL
464310	2016 AQ_{104}	—	November 12, 2010	Mount Lemmon	Mount Lemmon Survey	·	1.5 km	MPC · JPL
464311	2016 AY_{104}	—	April 7, 2008	Catalina	CSS	JUN	1.1 km	MPC · JPL
464312	2016 AD_{105}	—	July 24, 2000	Kitt Peak	Spacewatch	·	1.7 km	MPC · JPL
464313	2016 AK_{105}	—	September 9, 2008	Catalina	CSS	·	3.0 km	MPC · JPL
464314	2016 AP_{105}	—	November 27, 2011	Mount Lemmon	Mount Lemmon Survey	·	1.1 km	MPC · JPL
464315	2016 AK_{106}	—	February 22, 2006	Catalina	CSS	·	1.7 km	MPC · JPL
464316	2016 AP_{106}	—	November 20, 2009	Kitt Peak	Spacewatch	·	1.5 km	MPC · JPL
464317	2016 AN_{107}	—	February 23, 2007	Kitt Peak	Spacewatch	·	2.1 km	MPC · JPL
464318	2016 AQ_{107}	—	December 24, 2006	Kitt Peak	Spacewatch	·	1.5 km	MPC · JPL
464319	2016 AS_{107}	—	February 2, 2009	Kitt Peak	Spacewatch	·	930 m	MPC · JPL
464320	2016 AX_{107}	—	December 30, 2005	Kitt Peak	Spacewatch	·	1.6 km	MPC · JPL
464321	2016 AZ_{107}	—	February 25, 2012	Kitt Peak	Spacewatch	·	1.8 km	MPC · JPL
464322	2016 AK_{108}	—	March 4, 2005	Mount Lemmon	Mount Lemmon Survey	·	1.2 km	MPC · JPL
464323	2016 AR_{108}	—	September 12, 2007	Mount Lemmon	Mount Lemmon Survey	·	1 km	MPC · JPL
464324	2016 AS_{108}	—	August 28, 2005	Kitt Peak	Spacewatch	EUN	1.2 km	MPC · JPL
464325	2016 AA_{109}	—	February 16, 2010	Kitt Peak	Spacewatch	CYB	3.3 km	MPC · JPL
464326	2016 AV_{109}	—	March 4, 2005	Kitt Peak	Spacewatch	·	1.3 km	MPC · JPL
464327	2016 AB_{110}	—	April 9, 1997	Kitt Peak	Spacewatch	·	1.3 km	MPC · JPL
464328	2016 AQ_{110}	—	March 20, 1999	Apache Point	SDSS	·	1.3 km	MPC · JPL
464329	2016 AU_{110}	—	January 16, 2003	Palomar	NEAT	·	1.6 km	MPC · JPL
464330	2016 AH_{111}	—	January 26, 2006	Mount Lemmon	Mount Lemmon Survey	KOR	1.3 km	MPC · JPL
464331	2016 AL_{111}	—	November 1, 1999	Kitt Peak	Spacewatch	NYS	1.2 km	MPC · JPL
464332	2016 AU_{111}	—	July 29, 2010	WISE	WISE	·	1.8 km	MPC · JPL
464333	2016 AY_{111}	—	March 23, 2012	Mount Lemmon	Mount Lemmon Survey	·	2.9 km	MPC · JPL
464334	2016 AZ_{111}	—	January 17, 2005	Catalina	CSS	·	3.5 km	MPC · JPL
464335	2016 AD_{112}	—	October 30, 2005	Kitt Peak	Spacewatch	·	2.1 km	MPC · JPL
464336	2016 AQ_{112}	—	November 14, 2006	Kitt Peak	Spacewatch	·	1.2 km	MPC · JPL
464337	2016 AC_{113}	—	December 29, 2011	Kitt Peak	Spacewatch	·	1.1 km	MPC · JPL
464338	2016 AL_{113}	—	December 1, 2008	Mount Lemmon	Mount Lemmon Survey	·	1.1 km	MPC · JPL
464339	2016 AJ_{114}	—	May 1, 2012	Mount Lemmon	Mount Lemmon Survey	·	1.8 km	MPC · JPL
464340	2016 AT_{114}	—	February 20, 2006	Kitt Peak	Spacewatch	·	1.5 km	MPC · JPL
464341	2016 AH_{115}	—	August 9, 2010	WISE	WISE	·	2.8 km	MPC · JPL
464342	2016 AZ_{116}	—	January 19, 2005	Kitt Peak	Spacewatch	·	1.4 km	MPC · JPL
464343	2016 AG_{118}	—	January 28, 2000	Kitt Peak	Spacewatch	H	440 m	MPC · JPL
464344	2016 AL_{118}	—	April 19, 2007	Kitt Peak	Spacewatch	KOR	1.5 km	MPC · JPL
464345	2016 AQ_{118}	—	September 15, 2010	Mount Lemmon	Mount Lemmon Survey	(5)	890 m	MPC · JPL
464346	2016 AC_{119}	—	January 30, 2006	Kitt Peak	Spacewatch	·	1.7 km	MPC · JPL
464347	2016 AK_{119}	—	December 20, 2004	Mount Lemmon	Mount Lemmon Survey	·	2.3 km	MPC · JPL
464348	2016 AO_{120}	—	February 10, 2002	Socorro	LINEAR	·	2.5 km	MPC · JPL
464349	2016 AP_{120}	—	March 9, 2005	Mount Lemmon	Mount Lemmon Survey	·	2.3 km	MPC · JPL
464350	2016 AM_{121}	—	May 24, 2001	Apache Point	SDSS	·	2.0 km	MPC · JPL
464351	2016 AF_{122}	—	March 9, 2011	Mount Lemmon	Mount Lemmon Survey	·	2.0 km	MPC · JPL
464352	2016 AH_{122}	—	July 15, 2005	Mount Lemmon	Mount Lemmon Survey	·	1.3 km	MPC · JPL
464353	2016 AM_{122}	—	October 20, 2011	Mount Lemmon	Mount Lemmon Survey	·	640 m	MPC · JPL
464354	2016 AS_{122}	—	September 28, 2008	Catalina	CSS	·	4.0 km	MPC · JPL
464355	2016 AV_{122}	—	February 2, 2005	Kitt Peak	Spacewatch	·	3.8 km	MPC · JPL
464356	2016 AC_{123}	—	November 3, 2010	Mount Lemmon	Mount Lemmon Survey	·	1.6 km	MPC · JPL
464357	2016 AG_{140}	—	August 29, 2005	Kitt Peak	Spacewatch	·	1.5 km	MPC · JPL
464358	2016 AQ_{140}	—	November 26, 2000	Socorro	LINEAR	·	2.0 km	MPC · JPL
464359	2016 AE_{141}	—	March 31, 2008	Mount Lemmon	Mount Lemmon Survey	·	2.0 km	MPC · JPL
464360	2016 AF_{142}	—	September 29, 2009	Mount Lemmon	Mount Lemmon Survey	EOS	1.3 km	MPC · JPL
464361	2016 AO_{142}	—	March 8, 2005	Kitt Peak	Spacewatch	·	2.6 km	MPC · JPL
464362	2016 AM_{143}	—	April 29, 2000	Socorro	LINEAR	·	1.7 km	MPC · JPL
464363	2016 AO_{147}	—	June 8, 2013	Mount Lemmon	Mount Lemmon Survey	·	1.2 km	MPC · JPL
464364	2016 AB_{148}	—	January 16, 2005	Kitt Peak	Spacewatch	EOS	2.6 km	MPC · JPL
464365	2016 AB_{149}	—	December 16, 2006	Kitt Peak	Spacewatch	EUN	1.2 km	MPC · JPL
464366	2016 AB_{152}	—	May 4, 2006	Kitt Peak	Spacewatch	·	2.8 km	MPC · JPL
464367	2016 AF_{154}	—	September 7, 2008	Mount Lemmon	Mount Lemmon Survey	·	2.5 km	MPC · JPL
464368	2016 AO_{159}	—	October 23, 2006	Mount Lemmon	Mount Lemmon Survey	·	1.2 km	MPC · JPL
464369	2016 AV_{171}	—	June 3, 2008	Mount Lemmon	Mount Lemmon Survey	BRA	2.2 km	MPC · JPL
464370	2016 AP_{172}	—	March 12, 2010	WISE	WISE	·	3.9 km	MPC · JPL
464371	2016 AU_{172}	—	March 9, 2005	Catalina	CSS	·	2.0 km	MPC · JPL
464372	2016 AY_{172}	—	September 17, 2009	Mount Lemmon	Mount Lemmon Survey	·	1.9 km	MPC · JPL
464373	2016 AV_{173}	—	October 29, 2006	Catalina	CSS	·	2.6 km	MPC · JPL
464374	2016 AX_{173}	—	October 6, 2000	Anderson Mesa	LONEOS	·	1.6 km	MPC · JPL
464375	2016 AJ_{176}	—	September 20, 2003	Palomar	NEAT	·	3.4 km	MPC · JPL
464376	2016 AT_{176}	—	October 10, 2002	Apache Point	SDSS	·	3.0 km	MPC · JPL
464377	2016 AC_{177}	—	October 29, 2003	Kitt Peak	Spacewatch	TIR	2.2 km	MPC · JPL
464378	2016 AQ_{178}	—	October 1, 2005	Mount Lemmon	Mount Lemmon Survey	GEF	1.3 km	MPC · JPL
464379	2016 AK_{183}	—	December 14, 2010	Mount Lemmon	Mount Lemmon Survey	·	1.7 km	MPC · JPL
464380	2016 AW_{184}	—	February 4, 2005	Kitt Peak	Spacewatch	·	1.2 km	MPC · JPL
464381	2016 AN_{185}	—	January 25, 2006	Kitt Peak	Spacewatch	·	590 m	MPC · JPL
464382	2016 AC_{187}	—	November 21, 2009	Catalina	CSS	·	3.6 km	MPC · JPL
464383	2016 AH_{187}	—	March 10, 2010	WISE	WISE	·	2.9 km	MPC · JPL
464384	2016 AL_{187}	—	November 23, 2009	Catalina	CSS	·	3.7 km	MPC · JPL
464385	2016 AW_{187}	—	September 25, 2009	Kitt Peak	Spacewatch	KOR	1.4 km	MPC · JPL
464386	2016 AE_{194}	—	April 30, 2012	Mount Lemmon	Mount Lemmon Survey	·	3.6 km	MPC · JPL
464387	2016 BU_{1}	—	November 29, 2003	Kitt Peak	Spacewatch	·	1.3 km	MPC · JPL
464388	2016 BQ_{2}	—	April 7, 2013	Kitt Peak	Spacewatch	·	720 m	MPC · JPL
464389	2016 BS_{2}	—	February 27, 2006	Kitt Peak	Spacewatch	·	710 m	MPC · JPL
464390	2016 BV_{4}	—	March 11, 2005	Anderson Mesa	LONEOS	·	2.4 km	MPC · JPL
464391	2016 BW_{4}	—	March 8, 2005	Mount Lemmon	Mount Lemmon Survey	THM	1.8 km	MPC · JPL
464392	2016 BX_{4}	—	December 24, 2001	Kitt Peak	Spacewatch	·	2.7 km	MPC · JPL
464393	2016 BA_{7}	—	November 16, 2009	Mount Lemmon	Mount Lemmon Survey	·	3.2 km	MPC · JPL
464394	2016 BO_{7}	—	January 5, 2003	Socorro	LINEAR	EUN	1.4 km	MPC · JPL
464395	2016 BP_{12}	—	January 29, 1998	Kitt Peak	Spacewatch	·	1.4 km	MPC · JPL
464396	2016 BR_{12}	—	February 14, 1999	Caussols	ODAS	·	3.9 km	MPC · JPL
464397	2016 BF_{13}	—	October 27, 2003	Kitt Peak	Spacewatch	(31811)	3.6 km	MPC · JPL
464398	2016 BJ_{13}	—	March 2, 1997	Kitt Peak	Spacewatch	KOR	1.6 km	MPC · JPL
464399	2016 BP_{13}	—	August 7, 2007	Siding Spring	SSS	·	4.2 km	MPC · JPL
464400	2016 BB_{14}	—	January 7, 2002	Socorro	LINEAR	PHO	1.3 km	MPC · JPL

== 464401–464500 ==
back to top

Designation			Discovery			Properties		Ref
Permanent	Provisional	Named after	Date	Site	Discoverer(s)	Category	Diam.	Ref
464401	2016 BV_{15}	—	December 10, 2004	Kitt Peak	Spacewatch	·	4.2 km	MPC · JPL
464402	2016 BC_{18}	—	October 31, 2005	Mount Lemmon	Mount Lemmon Survey	·	1.6 km	MPC · JPL
464403	2016 BL_{18}	—	April 30, 1997	Kitt Peak	Spacewatch	·	1.4 km	MPC · JPL
464404	2016 BN_{18}	—	December 13, 2006	Kitt Peak	Spacewatch	·	1.6 km	MPC · JPL
464405	2016 BO_{18}	—	October 13, 1999	Apache Point	SDSS	·	1.3 km	MPC · JPL
464406	2016 BX_{18}	—	January 19, 2005	Kitt Peak	Spacewatch	MAS	660 m	MPC · JPL
464407	2016 BL_{19}	—	December 14, 2010	Mount Lemmon	Mount Lemmon Survey	·	2.2 km	MPC · JPL
464408	2016 BE_{20}	—	May 6, 2006	Kitt Peak	Spacewatch	·	2.6 km	MPC · JPL
464409	2016 BH_{20}	—	December 20, 2004	Mount Lemmon	Mount Lemmon Survey	THM	2.0 km	MPC · JPL
464410	2016 BE_{21}	—	September 15, 2004	Kitt Peak	Spacewatch	·	2.7 km	MPC · JPL
464411	2016 BU_{21}	—	March 9, 2005	Catalina	CSS	·	4.9 km	MPC · JPL
464412	2016 BW_{21}	—	January 27, 2012	Mount Lemmon	Mount Lemmon Survey	·	870 m	MPC · JPL
464413	2016 BH_{23}	—	December 17, 2003	Kitt Peak	Spacewatch	·	1.3 km	MPC · JPL
464414	2016 BA_{24}	—	December 20, 2009	Mount Lemmon	Mount Lemmon Survey	·	3.8 km	MPC · JPL
464415	2016 BE_{24}	—	October 17, 2003	Kitt Peak	Spacewatch	·	1.4 km	MPC · JPL
464416	2016 BL_{24}	—	March 8, 2005	Kitt Peak	Spacewatch	·	1.2 km	MPC · JPL
464417	2016 BH_{25}	—	September 28, 2003	Kitt Peak	Spacewatch	NYS	1.1 km	MPC · JPL
464418	2016 BP_{25}	—	January 26, 2011	Kitt Peak	Spacewatch	·	1.8 km	MPC · JPL
464419	2016 BY_{26}	—	March 3, 2010	WISE	WISE	LIX	2.7 km	MPC · JPL
464420	2016 BA_{27}	—	December 20, 2004	Mount Lemmon	Mount Lemmon Survey	·	3.3 km	MPC · JPL
464421	2016 BU_{29}	—	September 6, 2008	Mount Lemmon	Mount Lemmon Survey	LIX	3.2 km	MPC · JPL
464422	2016 BX_{29}	—	September 9, 2008	Mount Lemmon	Mount Lemmon Survey	EOS	1.8 km	MPC · JPL
464423	2016 BD_{30}	—	September 27, 2009	Mount Lemmon	Mount Lemmon Survey	·	2.2 km	MPC · JPL
464424	2016 BE_{30}	—	March 11, 2008	Kitt Peak	Spacewatch	·	1.3 km	MPC · JPL
464425	2016 BH_{30}	—	October 6, 2008	Kitt Peak	Spacewatch	·	3.2 km	MPC · JPL
464426	2016 BQ_{30}	—	November 24, 2006	Mount Lemmon	Mount Lemmon Survey	·	2.0 km	MPC · JPL
464427	2016 BC_{31}	—	October 21, 2009	Mount Lemmon	Mount Lemmon Survey	·	2.0 km	MPC · JPL
464428	2016 BN_{31}	—	February 8, 2010	WISE	WISE	·	3.8 km	MPC · JPL
464429	2016 BL_{32}	—	October 26, 2005	Kitt Peak	Spacewatch	·	1.9 km	MPC · JPL
464430	2016 BE_{33}	—	March 13, 2008	Mount Lemmon	Mount Lemmon Survey	·	830 m	MPC · JPL
464431	2016 BH_{33}	—	March 10, 2005	Mount Lemmon	Mount Lemmon Survey	·	950 m	MPC · JPL
464432	2016 BJ_{33}	—	October 8, 2004	Kitt Peak	Spacewatch	·	1.9 km	MPC · JPL
464433	2016 BU_{33}	—	September 26, 2003	Apache Point	SDSS	V	590 m	MPC · JPL
464434	2016 BN_{34}	—	January 25, 2007	Kitt Peak	Spacewatch	·	2.7 km	MPC · JPL
464435	2016 BQ_{34}	—	April 14, 2001	Kitt Peak	Spacewatch	·	3.1 km	MPC · JPL
464436	2016 BE_{35}	—	December 14, 2010	Mount Lemmon	Mount Lemmon Survey	·	2.7 km	MPC · JPL
464437	2016 BF_{35}	—	September 11, 2007	Mount Lemmon	Mount Lemmon Survey	·	720 m	MPC · JPL
464438	2016 BP_{35}	—	December 17, 2001	Socorro	LINEAR	V	690 m	MPC · JPL
464439	2016 BQ_{35}	—	September 13, 1998	Kitt Peak	Spacewatch	EOS	1.9 km	MPC · JPL
464440	2016 BS_{35}	—	December 20, 2004	Mount Lemmon	Mount Lemmon Survey	·	4.6 km	MPC · JPL
464441	2016 BU_{35}	—	September 15, 2010	Mount Lemmon	Mount Lemmon Survey	EUN	950 m	MPC · JPL
464442	2016 BA_{36}	—	October 19, 2010	Mount Lemmon	Mount Lemmon Survey	·	1.3 km	MPC · JPL
464443	2016 BB_{36}	—	January 15, 2005	Kitt Peak	Spacewatch	·	1.0 km	MPC · JPL
464444	2016 BE_{36}	—	February 10, 1999	Socorro	LINEAR	·	4.3 km	MPC · JPL
464445	2016 BF_{36}	—	February 6, 2002	Socorro	LINEAR	·	2.6 km	MPC · JPL
464446	2016 BJ_{36}	—	May 10, 2005	Mount Lemmon	Mount Lemmon Survey	·	2.0 km	MPC · JPL
464447	2016 BK_{36}	—	May 2, 2000	Anderson Mesa	LONEOS	·	3.3 km	MPC · JPL
464448	2016 BP_{36}	—	January 1, 2012	Mount Lemmon	Mount Lemmon Survey	·	1.4 km	MPC · JPL
464449	2016 BQ_{36}	—	August 21, 2008	Kitt Peak	Spacewatch	·	4.0 km	MPC · JPL
464450	2016 BT_{36}	—	March 28, 2008	Mount Lemmon	Mount Lemmon Survey	·	840 m	MPC · JPL
464451	2016 BA_{37}	—	February 25, 2011	Mount Lemmon	Mount Lemmon Survey	·	2.2 km	MPC · JPL
464452	2016 BC_{37}	—	January 10, 2011	Mount Lemmon	Mount Lemmon Survey	·	2.7 km	MPC · JPL
464453	2016 BB_{38}	—	January 4, 2011	Mount Lemmon	Mount Lemmon Survey	·	2.1 km	MPC · JPL
464454	2016 BY_{38}	—	November 17, 2009	Mount Lemmon	Mount Lemmon Survey	·	2.3 km	MPC · JPL
464455	2016 BR_{40}	—	March 12, 2011	Mount Lemmon	Mount Lemmon Survey	EOS	2.0 km	MPC · JPL
464456	2016 BA_{41}	—	August 28, 2009	Kitt Peak	Spacewatch	·	1.1 km	MPC · JPL
464457	2016 BJ_{41}	—	January 23, 1998	Kitt Peak	Spacewatch	·	1.1 km	MPC · JPL
464458	2016 BR_{41}	—	October 1, 2003	Kitt Peak	Spacewatch	·	3.3 km	MPC · JPL
464459	2016 BE_{42}	—	February 17, 2007	Kitt Peak	Spacewatch	·	1.8 km	MPC · JPL
464460	2016 BP_{43}	—	December 19, 2004	Mount Lemmon	Mount Lemmon Survey	THM	2.2 km	MPC · JPL
464461	2016 BU_{43}	—	January 17, 2005	Kitt Peak	Spacewatch	·	3.4 km	MPC · JPL
464462	2016 BX_{43}	—	November 25, 2005	Catalina	CSS	·	1.8 km	MPC · JPL
464463	2016 BC_{44}	—	January 16, 2005	Kitt Peak	Spacewatch	EOS	2.2 km	MPC · JPL
464464	2016 BH_{44}	—	October 9, 2004	Kitt Peak	Spacewatch	·	530 m	MPC · JPL
464465	2016 BY_{44}	—	December 25, 2005	Mount Lemmon	Mount Lemmon Survey	KOR	1.2 km	MPC · JPL
464466	2016 BZ_{45}	—	December 15, 2004	Kitt Peak	Spacewatch	·	870 m	MPC · JPL
464467	2016 BV_{46}	—	November 9, 2009	Kitt Peak	Spacewatch	·	2.6 km	MPC · JPL
464468	2016 BX_{46}	—	September 21, 2009	Mount Lemmon	Mount Lemmon Survey	KOR	1.3 km	MPC · JPL
464469	2016 BE_{47}	—	September 30, 2003	Kitt Peak	Spacewatch	EOS	2.3 km	MPC · JPL
464470	2016 BU_{47}	—	April 12, 2005	Kitt Peak	Spacewatch	MAS	590 m	MPC · JPL
464471	2016 BX_{47}	—	December 14, 2010	Mount Lemmon	Mount Lemmon Survey	·	2.1 km	MPC · JPL
464472	2016 BF_{48}	—	September 2, 2008	Kitt Peak	Spacewatch	·	2.8 km	MPC · JPL
464473	2016 BY_{48}	—	September 25, 2005	Kitt Peak	Spacewatch	·	1.8 km	MPC · JPL
464474	2016 BB_{49}	—	September 10, 2007	Mount Lemmon	Mount Lemmon Survey	·	640 m	MPC · JPL
464475	2016 BG_{49}	—	January 28, 2007	Mount Lemmon	Mount Lemmon Survey	AGN	1.1 km	MPC · JPL
464476	2016 BA_{51}	—	February 10, 2010	WISE	WISE	·	3.6 km	MPC · JPL
464477	2016 BC_{52}	—	January 31, 2009	Kitt Peak	Spacewatch	·	670 m	MPC · JPL
464478	2016 BK_{52}	—	February 2, 2005	Kitt Peak	Spacewatch	·	3.2 km	MPC · JPL
464479	2016 BS_{53}	—	October 18, 2003	Apache Point	SDSS	·	2.0 km	MPC · JPL
464480	2016 BV_{53}	—	May 10, 2000	Apache Point	SDSS	·	2.3 km	MPC · JPL
464481	2016 BR_{54}	—	March 10, 1999	Kitt Peak	Spacewatch	·	1.7 km	MPC · JPL
464482	2016 BS_{54}	—	January 16, 2005	Kitt Peak	Spacewatch	·	1.0 km	MPC · JPL
464483	2016 BM_{55}	—	March 11, 2005	Anderson Mesa	LONEOS	·	5.1 km	MPC · JPL
464484	2016 BK_{57}	—	October 30, 2005	Mount Lemmon	Mount Lemmon Survey	·	2.0 km	MPC · JPL
464485	2016 BK_{59}	—	November 8, 2009	Catalina	CSS	·	3.6 km	MPC · JPL
464486	2016 BY_{62}	—	January 26, 2007	Kitt Peak	Spacewatch	GEF	1.3 km	MPC · JPL
464487	2016 BN_{63}	—	March 10, 2007	Mount Lemmon	Mount Lemmon Survey	·	1.8 km	MPC · JPL
464488	2016 BS_{63}	—	February 25, 2011	Kitt Peak	Spacewatch	·	2.5 km	MPC · JPL
464489	2016 BB_{64}	—	March 8, 2005	Mount Lemmon	Mount Lemmon Survey	·	1.1 km	MPC · JPL
464490	2016 BO_{64}	—	January 10, 2007	Catalina	CSS	·	1.8 km	MPC · JPL
464491	2016 BS_{64}	—	November 15, 2006	Mount Lemmon	Mount Lemmon Survey	·	1.2 km	MPC · JPL
464492	2016 BJ_{68}	—	January 4, 2006	Mount Lemmon	Mount Lemmon Survey	·	690 m	MPC · JPL
464493	2016 BB_{69}	—	February 8, 2010	WISE	WISE	·	2.4 km	MPC · JPL
464494	2016 BQ_{69}	—	February 25, 2006	Kitt Peak	Spacewatch	·	920 m	MPC · JPL
464495	2016 BV_{69}	—	March 25, 2012	Mount Lemmon	Mount Lemmon Survey	HOF	2.4 km	MPC · JPL
464496	2016 BZ_{69}	—	February 4, 2005	Mount Lemmon	Mount Lemmon Survey	V	630 m	MPC · JPL
464497	2016 BL_{70}	—	April 28, 2008	Mount Lemmon	Mount Lemmon Survey	·	1.6 km	MPC · JPL
464498	2016 BZ_{71}	—	March 1, 2005	Kitt Peak	Spacewatch	·	3.6 km	MPC · JPL
464499	2016 BU_{72}	—	May 3, 2010	Kitt Peak	Spacewatch	·	600 m	MPC · JPL
464500	2016 BC_{74}	—	December 17, 2009	Mount Lemmon	Mount Lemmon Survey	·	5.0 km	MPC · JPL

== 464501–464600 ==
back to top

Designation			Discovery			Properties		Ref
Permanent	Provisional	Named after	Date	Site	Discoverer(s)	Category	Diam.	Ref
464501	2016 BW_{75}	—	February 1, 2005	Catalina	CSS	·	3.3 km	MPC · JPL
464502	2016 BX_{75}	—	October 23, 2008	Kitt Peak	Spacewatch	·	560 m	MPC · JPL
464503	2016 BB_{77}	—	October 18, 2007	Kitt Peak	Spacewatch	·	860 m	MPC · JPL
464504	2016 BF_{77}	—	March 19, 2007	Mount Lemmon	Mount Lemmon Survey	·	2.0 km	MPC · JPL
464505	2016 BJ_{77}	—	November 1, 2005	Mount Lemmon	Mount Lemmon Survey	·	1.6 km	MPC · JPL
464506	2016 BM_{77}	—	September 19, 2009	Mount Lemmon	Mount Lemmon Survey	·	1.7 km	MPC · JPL
464507	2016 BP_{77}	—	October 10, 2002	Apache Point	SDSS	·	2.5 km	MPC · JPL
464508	2016 BR_{77}	—	February 10, 2002	Kitt Peak	Spacewatch	·	1.2 km	MPC · JPL
464509	2016 BS_{77}	—	December 5, 2010	Kitt Peak	Spacewatch	HOF	3.0 km	MPC · JPL
464510	2016 BA_{78}	—	August 24, 2008	Kitt Peak	Spacewatch	·	2.5 km	MPC · JPL
464511	2016 BO_{79}	—	April 21, 2009	Kitt Peak	Spacewatch	V	600 m	MPC · JPL
464512	2016 BD_{80}	—	March 14, 2011	Mount Lemmon	Mount Lemmon Survey	·	1.7 km	MPC · JPL
464513	2016 BJ_{80}	—	April 18, 2007	Kitt Peak	Spacewatch	·	1.6 km	MPC · JPL
464514	2016 CN	—	March 1, 2005	Kitt Peak	Spacewatch	·	2.2 km	MPC · JPL
464515	2016 CL_{1}	—	May 22, 2006	Kitt Peak	Spacewatch	·	800 m	MPC · JPL
464516	2016 CN_{1}	—	December 30, 2005	Kitt Peak	Spacewatch	·	2.3 km	MPC · JPL
464517	2016 CR_{1}	—	December 27, 2005	Kitt Peak	Spacewatch	·	2.2 km	MPC · JPL
464518	2016 CN_{3}	—	September 21, 2003	Kitt Peak	Spacewatch	V	810 m	MPC · JPL
464519	2016 CP_{4}	—	October 5, 2004	Anderson Mesa	LONEOS	·	910 m	MPC · JPL
464520	2016 CE_{5}	—	October 24, 1995	Kitt Peak	Spacewatch	AGN	1.6 km	MPC · JPL
464521	2016 CM_{8}	—	November 13, 2010	Kitt Peak	Spacewatch	(29841)	1.4 km	MPC · JPL
464522	2016 CW_{9}	—	November 26, 2005	Mount Lemmon	Mount Lemmon Survey	·	420 m	MPC · JPL
464523	2016 CY_{11}	—	March 13, 2005	Kitt Peak	Spacewatch	NYS	1.1 km	MPC · JPL
464524	2016 CR_{12}	—	March 6, 2010	WISE	WISE	·	2.3 km	MPC · JPL
464525	2016 CG_{13}	—	April 19, 2009	Kitt Peak	Spacewatch	·	1.3 km	MPC · JPL
464526	2016 CJ_{13}	—	September 23, 2001	Kitt Peak	Spacewatch	·	1.4 km	MPC · JPL
464527	2016 CX_{13}	—	January 8, 2000	Kitt Peak	Spacewatch	·	1.9 km	MPC · JPL
464528	2016 CA_{15}	—	January 17, 2005	Kitt Peak	Spacewatch	·	2.6 km	MPC · JPL
464529	2016 CZ_{15}	—	January 27, 2007	Kitt Peak	Spacewatch	·	1.7 km	MPC · JPL
464530	2016 CT_{16}	—	April 7, 2005	Kitt Peak	Spacewatch	·	1.4 km	MPC · JPL
464531	2016 CB_{17}	—	November 4, 2005	Mount Lemmon	Mount Lemmon Survey	HOF	2.4 km	MPC · JPL
464532	2016 CW_{17}	—	November 2, 2010	Mount Lemmon	Mount Lemmon Survey	·	2.1 km	MPC · JPL
464533	2016 CB_{18}	—	March 21, 1999	Apache Point	SDSS	·	3.5 km	MPC · JPL
464534	2016 CZ_{19}	—	February 7, 2010	WISE	WISE	·	2.3 km	MPC · JPL
464535	2016 CX_{21}	—	October 28, 2005	Mount Lemmon	Mount Lemmon Survey	HOF	2.8 km	MPC · JPL
464536	2016 CO_{22}	—	January 17, 2005	Kitt Peak	Spacewatch	·	1.2 km	MPC · JPL
464537	2016 CG_{23}	—	March 16, 2005	Catalina	CSS	THB	3.1 km	MPC · JPL
464538	2016 CH_{23}	—	March 2, 2005	Kitt Peak	Spacewatch	·	1.4 km	MPC · JPL
464539	2016 CT_{23}	—	May 11, 2007	Mount Lemmon	Mount Lemmon Survey	EOS	2.2 km	MPC · JPL
464540	2016 CW_{23}	—	February 10, 2007	Catalina	CSS	·	2.2 km	MPC · JPL
464541	2016 CF_{27}	—	September 16, 2003	Kitt Peak	Spacewatch	EMA	2.6 km	MPC · JPL
464542	2016 CO_{32}	—	October 24, 2011	Mount Lemmon	Mount Lemmon Survey	·	630 m	MPC · JPL
464543	2016 CU_{32}	—	April 5, 2010	WISE	WISE	·	3.2 km	MPC · JPL
464544	2016 CW_{32}	—	September 18, 2003	Kitt Peak	Spacewatch	·	1.2 km	MPC · JPL
464545	2016 CP_{35}	—	February 13, 2004	Kitt Peak	Spacewatch	·	830 m	MPC · JPL
464546	2016 CK_{36}	—	October 25, 2005	Mount Lemmon	Mount Lemmon Survey	AST	1.7 km	MPC · JPL
464547	2016 CL_{36}	—	January 17, 2007	Kitt Peak	Spacewatch	·	1.1 km	MPC · JPL
464548	2016 CK_{37}	—	September 22, 2003	Kitt Peak	Spacewatch	·	2.4 km	MPC · JPL
464549	2016 CC_{38}	—	January 22, 2006	Mount Lemmon	Mount Lemmon Survey	·	710 m	MPC · JPL
464550	2016 CV_{38}	—	September 9, 2007	Kitt Peak	Spacewatch	·	760 m	MPC · JPL
464551	2016 CG_{40}	—	December 27, 2006	Kitt Peak	Spacewatch	·	1.6 km	MPC · JPL
464552	2016 CS_{40}	—	October 23, 2006	Mount Lemmon	Mount Lemmon Survey	·	1.1 km	MPC · JPL
464553	2016 CU_{40}	—	May 30, 2013	Kitt Peak	Spacewatch	·	2.4 km	MPC · JPL
464554	2016 CX_{40}	—	October 3, 2006	Mount Lemmon	Mount Lemmon Survey	(5)	1.1 km	MPC · JPL
464555	2016 CW_{42}	—	October 17, 2009	Kitt Peak	Spacewatch	·	1.8 km	MPC · JPL
464556	2016 CF_{43}	—	March 17, 2010	WISE	WISE	·	3.5 km	MPC · JPL
464557	2016 CN_{43}	—	November 4, 1996	Kitt Peak	Spacewatch	·	1.9 km	MPC · JPL
464558	2016 CZ_{43}	—	October 16, 2007	Catalina	CSS	·	1.3 km	MPC · JPL
464559	2016 CC_{44}	—	October 29, 2008	Kitt Peak	Spacewatch	·	930 m	MPC · JPL
464560	2016 CS_{44}	—	March 28, 2008	Mount Lemmon	Mount Lemmon Survey	·	1.5 km	MPC · JPL
464561	2016 CC_{47}	—	December 19, 2004	Mount Lemmon	Mount Lemmon Survey	V	670 m	MPC · JPL
464562	2016 CT_{48}	—	September 27, 2006	Kitt Peak	Spacewatch	·	1.0 km	MPC · JPL
464563	2016 CX_{49}	—	March 15, 2007	Kitt Peak	Spacewatch	·	2.0 km	MPC · JPL
464564	2016 CC_{50}	—	March 8, 2010	WISE	WISE	·	2.6 km	MPC · JPL
464565	2016 CZ_{51}	—	November 21, 2008	Kitt Peak	Spacewatch	HYG	3.1 km	MPC · JPL
464566	2016 CE_{52}	—	January 19, 2005	Kitt Peak	Spacewatch	·	2.8 km	MPC · JPL
464567	2016 CD_{56}	—	March 31, 2003	Kitt Peak	Spacewatch	·	740 m	MPC · JPL
464568	2016 CP_{60}	—	October 27, 2008	Mount Lemmon	Mount Lemmon Survey	·	3.8 km	MPC · JPL
464569	2016 CY_{63}	—	March 13, 2011	Mount Lemmon	Mount Lemmon Survey	·	3.0 km	MPC · JPL
464570	2016 CQ_{64}	—	November 12, 2001	Apache Point	SDSS	·	1.7 km	MPC · JPL
464571	2016 CS_{64}	—	October 18, 2003	Kitt Peak	Spacewatch	·	2.6 km	MPC · JPL
464572	2016 CA_{66}	—	October 27, 2005	Kitt Peak	Spacewatch	DOR	2.5 km	MPC · JPL
464573	2016 CY_{67}	—	March 16, 2007	Kitt Peak	Spacewatch	·	2.2 km	MPC · JPL
464574	2016 CG_{69}	—	December 3, 1996	Kitt Peak	Spacewatch	·	3.6 km	MPC · JPL
464575	2016 CW_{69}	—	October 5, 2002	Apache Point	SDSS	·	4.0 km	MPC · JPL
464576	2016 CS_{70}	—	November 22, 2006	Mount Lemmon	Mount Lemmon Survey	·	1.6 km	MPC · JPL
464577	2016 CN_{72}	—	November 25, 2005	Mount Lemmon	Mount Lemmon Survey	·	780 m	MPC · JPL
464578	2016 CO_{72}	—	April 3, 2010	WISE	WISE	·	3.5 km	MPC · JPL
464579	2016 CW_{74}	—	October 17, 2003	Kitt Peak	Spacewatch	·	3.1 km	MPC · JPL
464580	2016 CK_{76}	—	October 13, 2014	Mount Lemmon	Mount Lemmon Survey	·	1.9 km	MPC · JPL
464581	2016 CD_{81}	—	February 20, 2006	Kitt Peak	Spacewatch	EOS	1.9 km	MPC · JPL
464582	2016 CB_{89}	—	October 21, 2003	Palomar	NEAT	EOS	2.0 km	MPC · JPL
464583	2016 CE_{96}	—	November 18, 2003	Kitt Peak	Spacewatch	EOS	2.1 km	MPC · JPL
464584	2016 CM_{97}	—	February 6, 2011	Catalina	CSS	·	2.8 km	MPC · JPL
464585	2016 CT_{98}	—	April 7, 2006	Mount Lemmon	Mount Lemmon Survey	·	490 m	MPC · JPL
464586	2016 CZ_{100}	—	July 5, 2000	Kitt Peak	Spacewatch	·	2.1 km	MPC · JPL
464587	2016 CK_{103}	—	September 12, 2002	Palomar	NEAT	·	3.3 km	MPC · JPL
464588	2016 CW_{105}	—	June 8, 1999	Kitt Peak	Spacewatch	·	1.3 km	MPC · JPL
464589	2016 CG_{106}	—	October 7, 2005	Mount Lemmon	Mount Lemmon Survey	·	1.7 km	MPC · JPL
464590	2016 CH_{108}	—	November 18, 2006	Mount Lemmon	Mount Lemmon Survey	·	1.1 km	MPC · JPL
464591	2016 CF_{109}	—	November 10, 2010	Mount Lemmon	Mount Lemmon Survey	·	1.6 km	MPC · JPL
464592	2016 CY_{109}	—	March 12, 2008	Kitt Peak	Spacewatch	·	1.3 km	MPC · JPL
464593	2016 CP_{110}	—	January 12, 2010	Mount Lemmon	Mount Lemmon Survey	·	3.3 km	MPC · JPL
464594	2016 CK_{111}	—	June 16, 2009	Mount Lemmon	Mount Lemmon Survey	·	1.9 km	MPC · JPL
464595	2016 CH_{112}	—	October 8, 2008	Mount Lemmon	Mount Lemmon Survey	·	2.5 km	MPC · JPL
464596	2016 CS_{116}	—	November 3, 2004	Kitt Peak	Spacewatch	·	1.8 km	MPC · JPL
464597	2016 CN_{119}	—	March 17, 2010	WISE	WISE	·	2.4 km	MPC · JPL
464598	2016 CB_{121}	—	February 24, 2006	Kitt Peak	Spacewatch	·	1.9 km	MPC · JPL
464599	2016 CC_{121}	—	November 21, 2005	Kitt Peak	Spacewatch	·	2.3 km	MPC · JPL
464600	2016 CH_{121}	—	December 29, 2008	Kitt Peak	Spacewatch	·	630 m	MPC · JPL

== 464601–464700 ==
back to top

Designation			Discovery			Properties		Ref
Permanent	Provisional	Named after	Date	Site	Discoverer(s)	Category	Diam.	Ref
464601	2016 CN_{123}	—	April 26, 2006	Kitt Peak	Spacewatch	·	830 m	MPC · JPL
464602	2016 CU_{123}	—	November 19, 2009	Kitt Peak	Spacewatch	·	1.7 km	MPC · JPL
464603	2016 CF_{128}	—	September 11, 2007	Kitt Peak	Spacewatch	·	3.0 km	MPC · JPL
464604	2016 CR_{130}	—	October 22, 2003	Kitt Peak	Spacewatch	·	2.1 km	MPC · JPL
464605	2016 CT_{134}	—	January 29, 2011	Mount Lemmon	Mount Lemmon Survey	·	1.5 km	MPC · JPL
464606	2016 CE_{136}	—	November 17, 2001	Haleakala	NEAT	H	690 m	MPC · JPL
464607	2016 CD_{138}	—	March 10, 2005	Anderson Mesa	LONEOS	·	2.9 km	MPC · JPL
464608	2016 CG_{138}	—	February 23, 2012	Mount Lemmon	Mount Lemmon Survey	·	1.5 km	MPC · JPL
464609	2016 CV_{138}	—	August 28, 2006	Kitt Peak	Spacewatch	·	1.1 km	MPC · JPL
464610	2016 CW_{138}	—	January 31, 2006	Kitt Peak	Spacewatch	H	410 m	MPC · JPL
464611	2016 CW_{139}	—	February 5, 2009	Catalina	CSS	·	830 m	MPC · JPL
464612	2016 CJ_{140}	—	April 14, 2007	Mount Lemmon	Mount Lemmon Survey	·	1.8 km	MPC · JPL
464613	2016 CG_{141}	—	March 5, 2010	WISE	WISE	EOS	1.9 km	MPC · JPL
464614	2016 CE_{144}	—	April 20, 1993	Kitt Peak	Spacewatch	·	1.6 km	MPC · JPL
464615	2016 CJ_{167}	—	January 11, 2011	Mount Lemmon	Mount Lemmon Survey	·	2.1 km	MPC · JPL
464616	2016 CE_{175}	—	March 9, 2010	WISE	WISE	HYG	2.5 km	MPC · JPL
464617	2016 CU_{239}	—	December 21, 2003	Kitt Peak	Spacewatch	·	4.4 km	MPC · JPL
464618	2016 CO_{241}	—	November 6, 2005	Mount Lemmon	Mount Lemmon Survey	·	1.8 km	MPC · JPL
464619	2016 CP_{241}	—	October 8, 2002	Anderson Mesa	LONEOS	·	2.8 km	MPC · JPL
464620	2016 CN_{243}	—	November 18, 2003	Kitt Peak	Spacewatch	·	2.9 km	MPC · JPL
464621	2016 CD_{244}	—	December 20, 2009	Mount Lemmon	Mount Lemmon Survey	·	2.0 km	MPC · JPL
464622	2016 CB_{245}	—	October 27, 2008	Mount Lemmon	Mount Lemmon Survey	·	3.1 km	MPC · JPL
464623	1995 SB_{41}	—	September 25, 1995	Kitt Peak	Spacewatch	TIR	2.3 km	MPC · JPL
464624	1997 SG_{15}	—	September 28, 1997	Kitt Peak	Spacewatch	EOS	1.6 km	MPC · JPL
464625	1997 TJ_{27}	—	October 2, 1997	Kitt Peak	Spacewatch	·	600 m	MPC · JPL
464626	1998 SO_{172}	—	September 19, 1998	Apache Point	SDSS	EOS	1.6 km	MPC · JPL
464627	1998 UN_{50}	—	October 19, 1998	Kitt Peak	Spacewatch	·	790 m	MPC · JPL
464628	1999 CR_{147}	—	February 9, 1999	Kitt Peak	Spacewatch	·	1.3 km	MPC · JPL
464629	1999 CO_{159}	—	February 11, 1999	Kitt Peak	Spacewatch	·	1.5 km	MPC · JPL
464630	1999 EG_{8}	—	March 13, 1999	Kitt Peak	Spacewatch	·	3.7 km	MPC · JPL
464631	1999 RN_{193}	—	September 7, 1999	Kitt Peak	Spacewatch	·	960 m	MPC · JPL
464632	1999 TG_{23}	—	October 3, 1999	Kitt Peak	Spacewatch	·	2.0 km	MPC · JPL
464633	1999 TB_{46}	—	October 3, 1999	Kitt Peak	Spacewatch	·	890 m	MPC · JPL
464634	1999 TQ_{52}	—	October 5, 1999	Kitt Peak	Spacewatch	·	1.7 km	MPC · JPL
464635	1999 TB_{87}	—	October 15, 1999	Kitt Peak	Spacewatch	·	2.0 km	MPC · JPL
464636	1999 TY_{225}	—	October 2, 1999	Kitt Peak	Spacewatch	NYS	1.2 km	MPC · JPL
464637	1999 VG_{155}	—	October 2, 1999	Catalina	CSS	PHO	920 m	MPC · JPL
464638	2000 BY_{39}	—	January 27, 2000	Kitt Peak	Spacewatch	·	2.0 km	MPC · JPL
464639	2000 PO_{30}	—	August 2, 2000	Mauna Kea	M. Connors, Veillet, C.	AMO	520 m	MPC · JPL
464640	2000 QG_{115}	—	August 25, 2000	Socorro	LINEAR	·	740 m	MPC · JPL
464641	2000 QE_{145}	—	August 31, 2000	Socorro	LINEAR	·	710 m	MPC · JPL
464642	2000 QQ_{148}	—	August 1, 2000	Socorro	LINEAR	(1547)	1.9 km	MPC · JPL
464643	2000 QH_{180}	—	August 31, 2000	Socorro	LINEAR	·	1.6 km	MPC · JPL
464644	2000 RO_{38}	—	September 1, 2000	Socorro	LINEAR	·	1.3 km	MPC · JPL
464645	2000 SB_{49}	—	September 23, 2000	Socorro	LINEAR	·	830 m	MPC · JPL
464646	2000 SO_{199}	—	September 24, 2000	Socorro	LINEAR	·	1.5 km	MPC · JPL
464647	2000 SV_{359}	—	September 26, 2000	Anderson Mesa	LONEOS	·	800 m	MPC · JPL
464648	2000 TR_{28}	—	October 5, 2000	Haleakala	NEAT	·	1.8 km	MPC · JPL
464649	2000 VR_{1}	—	October 19, 2000	Kitt Peak	Spacewatch	·	1.9 km	MPC · JPL
464650	2000 VY_{44}	—	November 3, 2000	Socorro	LINEAR	·	3.3 km	MPC · JPL
464651	2000 WS_{122}	—	November 29, 2000	Socorro	LINEAR	·	1.2 km	MPC · JPL
464652	2001 GE_{4}	—	April 15, 2001	Kitt Peak	Spacewatch	·	1.1 km	MPC · JPL
464653	2001 KF_{32}	—	May 17, 2001	Kitt Peak	Spacewatch	H	530 m	MPC · JPL
464654	2001 NC_{13}	—	July 12, 2001	Palomar	NEAT	·	1.6 km	MPC · JPL
464655	2001 QA_{59}	—	August 17, 2001	Socorro	LINEAR	·	820 m	MPC · JPL
464656	2001 RS_{12}	—	August 27, 2001	Kitt Peak	Spacewatch	·	2.5 km	MPC · JPL
464657	2001 RU_{112}	—	September 12, 2001	Socorro	LINEAR	·	1.6 km	MPC · JPL
464658	2001 RX_{132}	—	September 12, 2001	Socorro	LINEAR	·	750 m	MPC · JPL
464659	2001 SH_{10}	—	September 19, 2001	Socorro	LINEAR	THB	2.9 km	MPC · JPL
464660	2001 SG_{41}	—	September 16, 2001	Socorro	LINEAR	H	510 m	MPC · JPL
464661	2001 SE_{102}	—	September 20, 2001	Socorro	LINEAR	·	1.1 km	MPC · JPL
464662	2001 SD_{119}	—	September 16, 2001	Socorro	LINEAR	·	1.4 km	MPC · JPL
464663	2001 SW_{133}	—	September 16, 2001	Socorro	LINEAR	·	3.1 km	MPC · JPL
464664	2001 SS_{201}	—	September 19, 2001	Socorro	LINEAR	·	1.3 km	MPC · JPL
464665	2001 SZ_{228}	—	September 19, 2001	Socorro	LINEAR	·	3.3 km	MPC · JPL
464666	2001 SA_{237}	—	September 19, 2001	Socorro	LINEAR	·	1.0 km	MPC · JPL
464667	2001 SR_{284}	—	September 22, 2001	Kitt Peak	Spacewatch	·	790 m	MPC · JPL
464668	2001 SZ_{304}	—	September 20, 2001	Socorro	LINEAR	·	2.8 km	MPC · JPL
464669	2001 SE_{314}	—	September 22, 2001	Socorro	LINEAR	·	1.0 km	MPC · JPL
464670	2001 SL_{341}	—	September 21, 2001	Socorro	LINEAR	·	2.6 km	MPC · JPL
464671	2001 SD_{353}	—	September 17, 2001	Kitt Peak	Spacewatch	·	880 m	MPC · JPL
464672	2001 TV_{16}	—	October 13, 2001	Socorro	LINEAR	H	500 m	MPC · JPL
464673	2001 TY_{59}	—	September 20, 2001	Socorro	LINEAR	·	610 m	MPC · JPL
464674	2001 TD_{86}	—	October 14, 2001	Socorro	LINEAR	·	1.1 km	MPC · JPL
464675	2001 TD_{89}	—	October 14, 2001	Socorro	LINEAR	·	690 m	MPC · JPL
464676	2001 TG_{93}	—	October 14, 2001	Socorro	LINEAR	·	1.6 km	MPC · JPL
464677	2001 TB_{127}	—	October 13, 2001	Kitt Peak	Spacewatch	·	1.0 km	MPC · JPL
464678	2001 TQ_{206}	—	October 11, 2001	Socorro	LINEAR	·	1.7 km	MPC · JPL
464679	2001 UD_{10}	—	October 23, 2001	Kitt Peak	Spacewatch	H	400 m	MPC · JPL
464680	2001 UM_{55}	—	October 13, 2001	Anderson Mesa	LONEOS	·	1.6 km	MPC · JPL
464681	2001 UA_{62}	—	October 17, 2001	Socorro	LINEAR	·	1.1 km	MPC · JPL
464682	2001 UU_{78}	—	October 13, 2001	Socorro	LINEAR	·	1.5 km	MPC · JPL
464683	2001 UK_{118}	—	October 22, 2001	Socorro	LINEAR	EUN	1.2 km	MPC · JPL
464684	2001 UR_{165}	—	October 23, 2001	Palomar	NEAT	H	640 m	MPC · JPL
464685	2001 UY_{212}	—	October 21, 2001	Kitt Peak	Spacewatch	·	3.2 km	MPC · JPL
464686	2001 VN_{67}	—	November 10, 2001	Socorro	LINEAR	·	2.5 km	MPC · JPL
464687	2001 VS_{125}	—	November 18, 2001	Socorro	LINEAR	·	1.6 km	MPC · JPL
464688	2001 WX_{45}	—	November 19, 2001	Socorro	LINEAR	·	1.6 km	MPC · JPL
464689	2001 WQ_{50}	—	November 17, 2001	Socorro	LINEAR	·	1.4 km	MPC · JPL
464690	2001 WR_{56}	—	October 24, 2001	Socorro	LINEAR	·	1.6 km	MPC · JPL
464691	2001 XP_{79}	—	November 17, 2001	Socorro	LINEAR	·	1.7 km	MPC · JPL
464692	2001 XA_{104}	—	December 14, 2001	Socorro	LINEAR	H	540 m	MPC · JPL
464693	2001 XO_{260}	—	October 19, 2001	Kitt Peak	Spacewatch	·	1.6 km	MPC · JPL
464694	2002 AK_{41}	—	January 9, 2002	Socorro	LINEAR	·	1.6 km	MPC · JPL
464695	2002 CL_{72}	—	January 19, 2002	Kitt Peak	Spacewatch	·	2.0 km	MPC · JPL
464696	2002 EA_{37}	—	February 12, 2002	Kitt Peak	Spacewatch	·	1.6 km	MPC · JPL
464697	2002 EC_{163}	—	March 10, 2002	Kitt Peak	Spacewatch	(2076)	630 m	MPC · JPL
464698	2002 GV_{155}	—	April 9, 2002	Anderson Mesa	LONEOS	H	510 m	MPC · JPL
464699	2002 GD_{186}	—	April 13, 2002	Palomar	NEAT	·	720 m	MPC · JPL
464700	2002 JE_{114}	—	May 15, 2002	Haleakala	NEAT	·	2.3 km	MPC · JPL

== 464701–464800 ==
back to top

Designation			Discovery			Properties		Ref
Permanent	Provisional	Named after	Date	Site	Discoverer(s)	Category	Diam.	Ref
464701	2002 NZ_{31}	—	July 5, 2002	Socorro	LINEAR	·	1.7 km	MPC · JPL
464702	2002 PT_{30}	—	August 6, 2002	Palomar	NEAT	·	1.1 km	MPC · JPL
464703	2002 PB_{64}	—	August 2, 2002	Campo Imperatore	CINEOS	·	2.7 km	MPC · JPL
464704	2002 PT_{105}	—	August 12, 2002	Socorro	LINEAR	·	1.5 km	MPC · JPL
464705	2002 PK_{166}	—	August 14, 2002	Palomar	R. Matson	·	890 m	MPC · JPL
464706	2002 QE_{73}	—	August 27, 2002	Palomar	NEAT	·	1.2 km	MPC · JPL
464707	2002 QD_{86}	—	August 17, 2002	Palomar	NEAT	NYS	1.1 km	MPC · JPL
464708	2002 QR_{86}	—	August 17, 2002	Palomar	NEAT	·	940 m	MPC · JPL
464709	2002 QN_{93}	—	August 18, 2002	Palomar	NEAT	·	1.5 km	MPC · JPL
464710	2002 QW_{100}	—	August 19, 2002	Palomar	NEAT	·	1.3 km	MPC · JPL
464711	2002 QW_{128}	—	August 29, 2002	Palomar	NEAT	NYS	880 m	MPC · JPL
464712	2002 QQ_{139}	—	August 17, 2002	Palomar	NEAT	·	760 m	MPC · JPL
464713	2002 QF_{140}	—	August 19, 2002	Palomar	NEAT	·	2.4 km	MPC · JPL
464714	2002 RF_{9}	—	September 4, 2002	Palomar	NEAT	·	1.1 km	MPC · JPL
464715	2002 RX_{69}	—	September 4, 2002	Anderson Mesa	LONEOS	·	1.2 km	MPC · JPL
464716	2002 RM_{148}	—	September 11, 2002	Palomar	NEAT	·	1.3 km	MPC · JPL
464717	2002 RN_{182}	—	September 11, 2002	Palomar	NEAT	·	2.9 km	MPC · JPL
464718	2002 RV_{202}	—	September 6, 2002	Socorro	LINEAR	(5)	1.4 km	MPC · JPL
464719	2002 RM_{247}	—	September 14, 2002	Palomar	NEAT	·	2.3 km	MPC · JPL
464720	2002 RX_{258}	—	September 14, 2002	Palomar	NEAT	NYS	710 m	MPC · JPL
464721	2002 SM_{10}	—	September 27, 2002	Palomar	NEAT	NYS	1.2 km	MPC · JPL
464722	2002 SC_{67}	—	September 17, 2002	Palomar	NEAT	·	2.5 km	MPC · JPL
464723	2002 TE_{44}	—	October 2, 2002	Socorro	LINEAR	·	3.0 km	MPC · JPL
464724	2002 TR_{107}	—	October 4, 2002	Socorro	LINEAR	·	990 m	MPC · JPL
464725	2002 TB_{171}	—	September 14, 2002	Anderson Mesa	LONEOS	·	2.6 km	MPC · JPL
464726	2002 TQ_{224}	—	October 8, 2002	Anderson Mesa	LONEOS	·	1.3 km	MPC · JPL
464727	2002 TV_{264}	—	October 10, 2002	Socorro	LINEAR	·	2.7 km	MPC · JPL
464728	2002 TB_{304}	—	October 4, 2002	Apache Point	SDSS	·	2.6 km	MPC · JPL
464729	2002 TS_{310}	—	October 4, 2002	Apache Point	SDSS	·	1.1 km	MPC · JPL
464730	2002 TW_{357}	—	October 10, 2002	Apache Point	SDSS	·	2.8 km	MPC · JPL
464731	2002 UQ_{44}	—	October 29, 2002	Kitt Peak	Spacewatch	·	3.0 km	MPC · JPL
464732	2002 UD_{56}	—	October 29, 2002	Apache Point	SDSS	·	2.4 km	MPC · JPL
464733	2002 XR_{4}	—	December 3, 2002	Palomar	NEAT	H	510 m	MPC · JPL
464734	2002 XG_{16}	—	December 3, 2002	Palomar	NEAT	H	620 m	MPC · JPL
464735	2003 CB_{13}	—	February 3, 2003	Palomar	NEAT	·	1.9 km	MPC · JPL
464736	2003 EV_{53}	—	March 11, 2003	Socorro	LINEAR	·	3.1 km	MPC · JPL
464737	2003 GA_{3}	—	March 10, 2003	Campo Imperatore	CINEOS	·	660 m	MPC · JPL
464738	2003 HN_{19}	—	April 26, 2003	Kitt Peak	Spacewatch	·	510 m	MPC · JPL
464739	2003 KD_{16}	—	May 22, 2003	Kitt Peak	Spacewatch	·	1.6 km	MPC · JPL
464740	2003 NO_{5}	—	July 4, 2003	Socorro	LINEAR	·	2.2 km	MPC · JPL
464741	2003 OP_{18}	—	July 25, 2003	Socorro	LINEAR	·	1.9 km	MPC · JPL
464742	2003 PB	—	August 1, 2003	Socorro	LINEAR	·	790 m	MPC · JPL
464743 Stanislavkomárek	2003 PA_{11}	Stanislavkomárek	August 6, 2003	Kleť	KLENOT	·	620 m	MPC · JPL
464744	2003 QO_{48}	—	August 20, 2003	Campo Imperatore	CINEOS	·	580 m	MPC · JPL
464745 Péterrózsa	2003 RQ_{7}	Péterrózsa	September 5, 2003	Piszkéstető	K. Sárneczky, B. Sipőcz	·	1.9 km	MPC · JPL
464746	2003 RQ_{23}	—	September 14, 2003	Palomar	NEAT	·	630 m	MPC · JPL
464747	2003 SL_{23}	—	September 16, 2003	Haleakala	NEAT	·	2.4 km	MPC · JPL
464748	2003 SG_{27}	—	September 18, 2003	Socorro	LINEAR	·	700 m	MPC · JPL
464749	2003 SS_{27}	—	September 18, 2003	Palomar	NEAT	T_{j} (2.96) · 3:2	7.5 km	MPC · JPL
464750	2003 SW_{40}	—	September 3, 2003	Socorro	LINEAR	·	1.1 km	MPC · JPL
464751	2003 SX_{141}	—	September 20, 2003	Socorro	LINEAR	·	2.9 km	MPC · JPL
464752	2003 SH_{196}	—	September 20, 2003	Palomar	NEAT	·	930 m	MPC · JPL
464753	2003 SY_{199}	—	September 21, 2003	Anderson Mesa	LONEOS	PHO	3.6 km	MPC · JPL
464754	2003 SF_{205}	—	September 18, 2003	Kitt Peak	Spacewatch	·	2.3 km	MPC · JPL
464755	2003 SA_{220}	—	September 28, 2003	Socorro	LINEAR	·	1.1 km	MPC · JPL
464756	2003 SZ_{268}	—	September 20, 2003	Kitt Peak	Spacewatch	·	1.7 km	MPC · JPL
464757	2003 SP_{291}	—	September 30, 2003	Socorro	LINEAR	·	1.5 km	MPC · JPL
464758	2003 SB_{324}	—	September 16, 2003	Kitt Peak	Spacewatch	·	830 m	MPC · JPL
464759	2003 SZ_{332}	—	September 30, 2003	Kitt Peak	Spacewatch	MAS	670 m	MPC · JPL
464760	2003 SG_{394}	—	September 26, 2003	Apache Point	SDSS	·	890 m	MPC · JPL
464761	2003 SQ_{400}	—	September 26, 2003	Apache Point	SDSS	·	1.3 km	MPC · JPL
464762	2003 SU_{427}	—	September 19, 2003	Kitt Peak	Spacewatch	·	690 m	MPC · JPL
464763	2003 TD_{6}	—	October 1, 2003	Anderson Mesa	LONEOS	·	980 m	MPC · JPL
464764	2003 US_{20}	—	October 20, 2003	Kitt Peak	Spacewatch	·	890 m	MPC · JPL
464765	2003 UY_{22}	—	October 19, 2003	Kitt Peak	Spacewatch	·	2.9 km	MPC · JPL
464766	2003 UJ_{62}	—	August 26, 2003	Socorro	LINEAR	·	2.1 km	MPC · JPL
464767	2003 UB_{165}	—	October 21, 2003	Kitt Peak	Spacewatch	·	2.6 km	MPC · JPL
464768	2003 UM_{171}	—	October 19, 2003	Kitt Peak	Spacewatch	·	2.2 km	MPC · JPL
464769	2003 UG_{175}	—	September 16, 2003	Kitt Peak	Spacewatch	(2076)	860 m	MPC · JPL
464770	2003 UT_{211}	—	October 23, 2003	Kitt Peak	Spacewatch	·	1.1 km	MPC · JPL
464771	2003 UQ_{219}	—	October 21, 2003	Kitt Peak	Spacewatch	V	580 m	MPC · JPL
464772	2003 UW_{229}	—	October 23, 2003	Anderson Mesa	LONEOS	·	2.0 km	MPC · JPL
464773	2003 UL_{260}	—	September 28, 2003	Kitt Peak	Spacewatch	MAS	520 m	MPC · JPL
464774	2003 UB_{275}	—	October 29, 2003	Socorro	LINEAR	·	920 m	MPC · JPL
464775	2003 UU_{281}	—	October 29, 2003	Anderson Mesa	LONEOS	·	1.0 km	MPC · JPL
464776	2003 UF_{286}	—	September 28, 2003	Kitt Peak	Spacewatch	EOS	1.4 km	MPC · JPL
464777	2003 UN_{328}	—	October 17, 2003	Apache Point	SDSS	(2076)	720 m	MPC · JPL
464778	2003 US_{378}	—	October 22, 2003	Apache Point	SDSS	TRE	1.8 km	MPC · JPL
464779	2003 WS_{15}	—	October 20, 2003	Kitt Peak	Spacewatch	·	1.6 km	MPC · JPL
464780	2003 WK_{53}	—	November 20, 2003	Kitt Peak	Spacewatch	·	2.4 km	MPC · JPL
464781	2003 WZ_{68}	—	November 2, 2003	Socorro	LINEAR	·	2.9 km	MPC · JPL
464782	2003 WQ_{108}	—	November 20, 2003	Kitt Peak	Spacewatch	·	2.7 km	MPC · JPL
464783	2003 WV_{133}	—	November 21, 2003	Socorro	LINEAR	·	2.8 km	MPC · JPL
464784	2003 WM_{148}	—	November 24, 2003	Kitt Peak	Spacewatch	EOS	2.3 km	MPC · JPL
464785	2003 WJ_{158}	—	November 28, 2003	Kitt Peak	Spacewatch	·	2.0 km	MPC · JPL
464786	2003 WN_{176}	—	November 19, 2003	Kitt Peak	Spacewatch	·	1.0 km	MPC · JPL
464787	2003 XY_{27}	—	December 1, 2003	Kitt Peak	Spacewatch	·	1.9 km	MPC · JPL
464788	2003 XP_{34}	—	December 1, 2003	Kitt Peak	Spacewatch	EOS	1.6 km	MPC · JPL
464789	2004 AQ_{13}	—	January 13, 2004	Kitt Peak	Spacewatch	·	810 m	MPC · JPL
464790	2004 BB_{8}	—	January 17, 2004	Kitt Peak	Spacewatch	·	1.1 km	MPC · JPL
464791	2004 BK_{8}	—	December 29, 2003	Kitt Peak	Spacewatch	·	2.3 km	MPC · JPL
464792	2004 BH_{15}	—	December 21, 2003	Kitt Peak	Spacewatch	·	3.2 km	MPC · JPL
464793	2004 BE_{26}	—	January 16, 2004	Mount Graham	Ryan, W. H.	·	2.3 km	MPC · JPL
464794	2004 BE_{70}	—	January 22, 2004	Socorro	LINEAR	·	3.7 km	MPC · JPL
464795	2004 BA_{138}	—	January 19, 2004	Kitt Peak	Spacewatch	·	2.3 km	MPC · JPL
464796	2004 ER_{70}	—	March 15, 2004	Kitt Peak	Spacewatch	·	2.2 km	MPC · JPL
464797	2004 FZ_{1}	—	March 18, 2004	Socorro	LINEAR	APO	730 m	MPC · JPL
464798	2004 JX_{20}	—	May 15, 2004	Catalina	CSS	ATE +1km	1.1 km	MPC · JPL
464799	2004 JZ_{32}	—	May 15, 2004	Socorro	LINEAR	·	1.3 km	MPC · JPL
464800	2004 JU_{34}	—	May 15, 2004	Socorro	LINEAR	·	840 m	MPC · JPL

== 464801–464900 ==
back to top

Designation			Discovery			Properties		Ref
Permanent	Provisional	Named after	Date	Site	Discoverer(s)	Category	Diam.	Ref
464801	2004 JN_{53}	—	April 25, 2004	Kitt Peak	Spacewatch	·	820 m	MPC · JPL
464802	2004 ND_{6}	—	July 11, 2004	Socorro	LINEAR	·	1.1 km	MPC · JPL
464803	2004 PY_{60}	—	August 9, 2004	Socorro	LINEAR	·	1.4 km	MPC · JPL
464804	2004 PY_{91}	—	July 11, 2004	Socorro	LINEAR	·	1.7 km	MPC · JPL
464805	2004 QS_{13}	—	August 22, 2004	Reedy Creek	J. Broughton	·	2.8 km	MPC · JPL
464806	2004 RF_{72}	—	September 8, 2004	Socorro	LINEAR	·	2.0 km	MPC · JPL
464807	2004 RY_{73}	—	September 8, 2004	Socorro	LINEAR	MRX	1.1 km	MPC · JPL
464808	2004 RJ_{101}	—	September 8, 2004	Socorro	LINEAR	·	660 m	MPC · JPL
464809	2004 RS_{103}	—	August 12, 2004	Socorro	LINEAR	·	1.5 km	MPC · JPL
464810	2004 RF_{120}	—	September 7, 2004	Kitt Peak	Spacewatch	·	1.9 km	MPC · JPL
464811	2004 RC_{175}	—	July 14, 2004	Socorro	LINEAR	·	1.6 km	MPC · JPL
464812	2004 RK_{176}	—	September 10, 2004	Socorro	LINEAR	JUN	1.0 km	MPC · JPL
464813	2004 RD_{213}	—	September 11, 2004	Socorro	LINEAR	·	2.5 km	MPC · JPL
464814	2004 RH_{252}	—	September 14, 2004	Socorro	LINEAR	H	540 m	MPC · JPL
464815	2004 RV_{257}	—	August 27, 2004	Catalina	CSS	·	770 m	MPC · JPL
464816	2004 ST_{23}	—	September 17, 2004	Kitt Peak	Spacewatch	·	1.6 km	MPC · JPL
464817	2004 SK_{29}	—	September 9, 2004	Socorro	LINEAR	·	730 m	MPC · JPL
464818	2004 TV_{26}	—	October 4, 2004	Kitt Peak	Spacewatch	(1547)	1.4 km	MPC · JPL
464819	2004 TG_{53}	—	October 4, 2004	Kitt Peak	Spacewatch	·	2.6 km	MPC · JPL
464820	2004 TX_{82}	—	October 5, 2004	Kitt Peak	Spacewatch	·	1.4 km	MPC · JPL
464821	2004 TD_{107}	—	October 7, 2004	Socorro	LINEAR	·	1.8 km	MPC · JPL
464822	2004 TF_{112}	—	October 7, 2004	Kitt Peak	Spacewatch	·	1.8 km	MPC · JPL
464823	2004 TL_{194}	—	October 7, 2004	Kitt Peak	Spacewatch	·	2.5 km	MPC · JPL
464824	2004 TY_{207}	—	October 7, 2004	Kitt Peak	Spacewatch	615	1.4 km	MPC · JPL
464825	2004 TQ_{317}	—	October 11, 2004	Kitt Peak	Spacewatch	H	440 m	MPC · JPL
464826	2004 TR_{368}	—	October 7, 2004	Kitt Peak	Spacewatch	·	2.0 km	MPC · JPL
464827	2004 VV_{41}	—	November 4, 2004	Kitt Peak	Spacewatch	(16286)	1.5 km	MPC · JPL
464828	2004 VT_{54}	—	November 5, 2004	Socorro	LINEAR	·	2.8 km	MPC · JPL
464829	2004 XY_{36}	—	December 11, 2004	Campo Imperatore	CINEOS	·	810 m	MPC · JPL
464830	2004 XD_{42}	—	December 2, 2004	Palomar	NEAT	H	490 m	MPC · JPL
464831	2005 AR_{20}	—	December 20, 2004	Mount Lemmon	Mount Lemmon Survey	·	760 m	MPC · JPL
464832	2005 BG_{26}	—	November 21, 2004	Campo Imperatore	CINEOS	·	3.3 km	MPC · JPL
464833	2005 CV_{3}	—	February 1, 2005	Kitt Peak	Spacewatch	·	2.0 km	MPC · JPL
464834	2005 CX_{10}	—	February 1, 2005	Kitt Peak	Spacewatch	·	970 m	MPC · JPL
464835	2005 CS_{12}	—	February 2, 2005	Catalina	CSS	·	2.1 km	MPC · JPL
464836	2005 CU_{14}	—	February 2, 2005	Kitt Peak	Spacewatch	·	610 m	MPC · JPL
464837	2005 CT_{46}	—	February 2, 2005	Kitt Peak	Spacewatch	·	3.2 km	MPC · JPL
464838	2005 CB_{51}	—	February 2, 2005	Kitt Peak	Spacewatch	·	3.4 km	MPC · JPL
464839	2005 CX_{67}	—	February 2, 2005	Catalina	CSS	·	2.8 km	MPC · JPL
464840	2005 EZ_{17}	—	March 3, 2005	Kitt Peak	Spacewatch	·	2.1 km	MPC · JPL
464841	2005 EY_{66}	—	March 4, 2005	Mount Lemmon	Mount Lemmon Survey	·	870 m	MPC · JPL
464842	2005 EF_{153}	—	March 7, 2005	Socorro	LINEAR	H	470 m	MPC · JPL
464843	2005 ET_{167}	—	March 4, 2005	Kitt Peak	Spacewatch	·	1.0 km	MPC · JPL
464844	2005 EB_{213}	—	March 4, 2005	Mount Lemmon	Mount Lemmon Survey	NYS	750 m	MPC · JPL
464845	2005 EF_{227}	—	March 9, 2005	Mount Lemmon	Mount Lemmon Survey	·	2.3 km	MPC · JPL
464846	2005 EX_{230}	—	March 3, 2005	Catalina	CSS	·	990 m	MPC · JPL
464847	2005 EM_{252}	—	March 10, 2005	Mount Lemmon	Mount Lemmon Survey	·	870 m	MPC · JPL
464848	2005 EE_{257}	—	March 11, 2005	Mount Lemmon	Mount Lemmon Survey	NYS	890 m	MPC · JPL
464849	2005 ES_{285}	—	March 13, 2005	Kitt Peak	Spacewatch	·	2.2 km	MPC · JPL
464850	2005 EL_{286}	—	March 8, 2005	Catalina	CSS	H	510 m	MPC · JPL
464851	2005 EP_{330}	—	March 15, 2005	Mount Lemmon	Mount Lemmon Survey	THB	3.4 km	MPC · JPL
464852	2005 FZ_{12}	—	March 17, 2005	Catalina	CSS	·	1.5 km	MPC · JPL
464853	2005 GM_{23}	—	March 11, 2005	Kitt Peak	Spacewatch	·	2.7 km	MPC · JPL
464854	2005 GF_{29}	—	April 4, 2005	Kitt Peak	Spacewatch	·	2.5 km	MPC · JPL
464855	2005 GJ_{40}	—	April 4, 2005	Mount Lemmon	Mount Lemmon Survey	MAS	700 m	MPC · JPL
464856	2005 GC_{45}	—	April 5, 2005	Mount Lemmon	Mount Lemmon Survey	NYS	780 m	MPC · JPL
464857	2005 GA_{47}	—	March 17, 2005	Kitt Peak	Spacewatch	·	1.1 km	MPC · JPL
464858	2005 GS_{49}	—	April 5, 2005	Mount Lemmon	Mount Lemmon Survey	·	1.0 km	MPC · JPL
464859	2005 GE_{68}	—	April 2, 2005	Catalina	CSS	·	2.2 km	MPC · JPL
464860	2005 GY_{76}	—	April 5, 2005	Catalina	CSS	T_{j} (2.99)	3.8 km	MPC · JPL
464861	2005 GV_{98}	—	April 7, 2005	Kitt Peak	Spacewatch	·	1.0 km	MPC · JPL
464862	2005 GP_{109}	—	April 10, 2005	Mount Lemmon	Mount Lemmon Survey	MAS	750 m	MPC · JPL
464863	2005 GA_{110}	—	April 10, 2005	Mount Lemmon	Mount Lemmon Survey	PHO	970 m	MPC · JPL
464864	2005 GF_{136}	—	April 10, 2005	Kitt Peak	Spacewatch	·	1.2 km	MPC · JPL
464865	2005 GB_{176}	—	April 14, 2005	Kitt Peak	Spacewatch	·	4.0 km	MPC · JPL
464866	2005 GV_{209}	—	April 6, 2005	Catalina	CSS	·	3.8 km	MPC · JPL
464867	2005 GO_{223}	—	April 6, 2005	Catalina	CSS	·	1.5 km	MPC · JPL
464868	2005 HM_{6}	—	April 30, 2005	Kitt Peak	Spacewatch	·	1.6 km	MPC · JPL
464869	2005 JL_{22}	—	May 4, 2005	Kitt Peak	Deep Lens Survey	T_{j} (2.99)	3.4 km	MPC · JPL
464870	2005 JX_{24}	—	May 3, 2005	Kitt Peak	Spacewatch	·	960 m	MPC · JPL
464871	2005 JN_{28}	—	May 3, 2005	Kitt Peak	Spacewatch	·	2.7 km	MPC · JPL
464872	2005 JB_{32}	—	May 4, 2005	Socorro	LINEAR	·	1.1 km	MPC · JPL
464873	2005 JF_{61}	—	May 8, 2005	Kitt Peak	Spacewatch	·	3.5 km	MPC · JPL
464874	2005 JZ_{83}	—	May 8, 2005	Kitt Peak	Spacewatch	V	620 m	MPC · JPL
464875	2005 JD_{89}	—	May 11, 2005	Kitt Peak	Spacewatch	·	2.8 km	MPC · JPL
464876	2005 JP_{99}	—	April 30, 2005	Kitt Peak	Spacewatch	·	2.2 km	MPC · JPL
464877	2005 JY_{130}	—	April 30, 2005	Kitt Peak	Spacewatch	·	3.0 km	MPC · JPL
464878	2005 JL_{141}	—	May 14, 2005	Mount Lemmon	Mount Lemmon Survey	NYS	1.1 km	MPC · JPL
464879	2005 JF_{158}	—	April 9, 2005	Mount Lemmon	Mount Lemmon Survey	EOS	2.0 km	MPC · JPL
464880	2005 JK_{175}	—	May 10, 2005	Kitt Peak	Spacewatch	·	3.1 km	MPC · JPL
464881	2005 JF_{177}	—	May 5, 2005	Kitt Peak	Deep Lens Survey	H	670 m	MPC · JPL
464882	2005 KB_{4}	—	March 10, 2005	Mount Lemmon	Mount Lemmon Survey	ERI	1.4 km	MPC · JPL
464883	2005 KE_{13}	—	May 19, 2005	Mount Lemmon	Mount Lemmon Survey	·	2.9 km	MPC · JPL
464884	2005 LY_{1}	—	June 1, 2005	Kitt Peak	Spacewatch	ERI	1.5 km	MPC · JPL
464885	2005 LS_{3}	—	June 4, 2005	Socorro	LINEAR	AMO	380 m	MPC · JPL
464886	2005 LO_{13}	—	May 8, 2005	Kitt Peak	Spacewatch	·	3.2 km	MPC · JPL
464887	2005 LX_{16}	—	May 4, 2005	Mount Lemmon	Mount Lemmon Survey	·	4.1 km	MPC · JPL
464888	2005 MU_{7}	—	May 29, 2005	Siding Spring	SSS	·	1.2 km	MPC · JPL
464889	2005 MN_{19}	—	June 29, 2005	Kitt Peak	Spacewatch	·	3.4 km	MPC · JPL
464890	2005 NZ_{124}	—	July 4, 2005	Kitt Peak	Spacewatch	·	1 km	MPC · JPL
464891	2005 PA_{4}	—	August 6, 2005	Socorro	LINEAR	T_{j} (2.95)	5.1 km	MPC · JPL
464892	2005 PJ_{21}	—	August 9, 2005	Socorro	LINEAR	·	1.9 km	MPC · JPL
464893	2005 QQ_{140}	—	August 28, 2005	Siding Spring	SSS	T_{j} (2.93)	3.7 km	MPC · JPL
464894	2005 QM_{142}	—	August 30, 2005	Kitt Peak	Spacewatch	CYB	4.6 km	MPC · JPL
464895	2005 RX_{21}	—	August 28, 2005	Kitt Peak	Spacewatch	·	1.5 km	MPC · JPL
464896	2005 RS_{40}	—	September 12, 2005	Socorro	LINEAR	·	1.8 km	MPC · JPL
464897	2005 SM_{9}	—	September 23, 2005	Catalina	CSS	·	1.4 km	MPC · JPL
464898	2005 SA_{20}	—	September 9, 2005	Socorro	LINEAR	·	1.7 km	MPC · JPL
464899	2005 SV_{30}	—	September 23, 2005	Catalina	CSS	·	1.3 km	MPC · JPL
464900	2005 SH_{37}	—	September 24, 2005	Kitt Peak	Spacewatch	·	1.2 km	MPC · JPL

== 464901–465000 ==
back to top

Designation			Discovery			Properties		Ref
Permanent	Provisional	Named after	Date	Site	Discoverer(s)	Category	Diam.	Ref
464901	2005 SC_{64}	—	September 26, 2005	Kitt Peak	Spacewatch	(5)	1.0 km	MPC · JPL
464902	2005 SE_{80}	—	September 24, 2005	Kitt Peak	Spacewatch	·	1.2 km	MPC · JPL
464903	2005 SW_{120}	—	September 29, 2005	Kitt Peak	Spacewatch	ADE	2.0 km	MPC · JPL
464904	2005 SP_{153}	—	September 26, 2005	Kitt Peak	Spacewatch	·	1.2 km	MPC · JPL
464905	2005 SR_{185}	—	September 29, 2005	Mount Lemmon	Mount Lemmon Survey	·	630 m	MPC · JPL
464906	2005 SF_{189}	—	September 29, 2005	Mount Lemmon	Mount Lemmon Survey	·	1.4 km	MPC · JPL
464907	2005 SR_{189}	—	September 29, 2005	Mount Lemmon	Mount Lemmon Survey	(5)	980 m	MPC · JPL
464908	2005 SY_{190}	—	September 29, 2005	Anderson Mesa	LONEOS	·	1.8 km	MPC · JPL
464909	2005 SP_{260}	—	September 23, 2005	Kitt Peak	Spacewatch	EUN	1.3 km	MPC · JPL
464910	2005 TT	—	October 3, 2005	Palomar	NEAT	·	2.1 km	MPC · JPL
464911	2005 TZ_{12}	—	October 2, 2005	Mount Lemmon	Mount Lemmon Survey	·	1.3 km	MPC · JPL
464912	2005 TQ_{20}	—	October 1, 2005	Mount Lemmon	Mount Lemmon Survey	CYB	3.4 km	MPC · JPL
464913	2005 TD_{81}	—	October 3, 2005	Kitt Peak	Spacewatch	·	1.4 km	MPC · JPL
464914	2005 TS_{83}	—	October 3, 2005	Kitt Peak	Spacewatch	·	890 m	MPC · JPL
464915	2005 TF_{104}	—	October 3, 2005	Socorro	LINEAR	EUN	1.2 km	MPC · JPL
464916	2005 TO_{133}	—	October 9, 2005	Kitt Peak	Spacewatch	·	1.3 km	MPC · JPL
464917	2005 TW_{141}	—	September 29, 2005	Kitt Peak	Spacewatch	·	1.1 km	MPC · JPL
464918	2005 TJ_{143}	—	September 24, 2005	Kitt Peak	Spacewatch	·	1.2 km	MPC · JPL
464919	2005 TR_{154}	—	September 29, 2005	Kitt Peak	Spacewatch	·	1.0 km	MPC · JPL
464920	2005 TF_{170}	—	October 10, 2005	Kitt Peak	Spacewatch	·	1.5 km	MPC · JPL
464921	2005 UC_{40}	—	October 24, 2005	Kitt Peak	Spacewatch	·	1.5 km	MPC · JPL
464922	2005 UF_{45}	—	October 22, 2005	Kitt Peak	Spacewatch	·	1.7 km	MPC · JPL
464923	2005 UR_{52}	—	September 25, 2005	Kitt Peak	Spacewatch	·	1.4 km	MPC · JPL
464924	2005 UZ_{94}	—	October 22, 2005	Kitt Peak	Spacewatch	MRX	990 m	MPC · JPL
464925	2005 UY_{95}	—	October 22, 2005	Kitt Peak	Spacewatch	·	1.1 km	MPC · JPL
464926	2005 UW_{122}	—	October 24, 2005	Kitt Peak	Spacewatch	·	1.2 km	MPC · JPL
464927	2005 UZ_{161}	—	October 5, 2005	Catalina	CSS	·	1.8 km	MPC · JPL
464928	2005 UL_{165}	—	October 24, 2005	Kitt Peak	Spacewatch	·	1.2 km	MPC · JPL
464929	2005 UZ_{169}	—	October 24, 2005	Kitt Peak	Spacewatch	·	1.7 km	MPC · JPL
464930	2005 UK_{170}	—	October 24, 2005	Kitt Peak	Spacewatch	·	1.0 km	MPC · JPL
464931	2005 UM_{199}	—	October 25, 2005	Kitt Peak	Spacewatch	·	1.3 km	MPC · JPL
464932	2005 UJ_{211}	—	October 27, 2005	Kitt Peak	Spacewatch	·	1.2 km	MPC · JPL
464933	2005 UV_{213}	—	October 22, 2005	Palomar	NEAT	·	1.6 km	MPC · JPL
464934	2005 UR_{233}	—	October 25, 2005	Kitt Peak	Spacewatch	MAR	1.1 km	MPC · JPL
464935	2005 UW_{234}	—	October 25, 2005	Kitt Peak	Spacewatch	·	2.0 km	MPC · JPL
464936	2005 UG_{253}	—	September 30, 2005	Mount Lemmon	Mount Lemmon Survey	·	1.4 km	MPC · JPL
464937	2005 UE_{287}	—	October 26, 2005	Kitt Peak	Spacewatch	·	1.5 km	MPC · JPL
464938	2005 UV_{293}	—	October 26, 2005	Kitt Peak	Spacewatch	·	1.1 km	MPC · JPL
464939	2005 UH_{325}	—	September 24, 2005	Kitt Peak	Spacewatch	·	1.4 km	MPC · JPL
464940	2005 UO_{330}	—	October 28, 2005	Mount Lemmon	Mount Lemmon Survey	·	1.4 km	MPC · JPL
464941	2005 UT_{397}	—	October 1, 2005	Socorro	LINEAR	·	1.6 km	MPC · JPL
464942	2005 UG_{401}	—	October 27, 2005	Kitt Peak	Spacewatch	·	1.4 km	MPC · JPL
464943	2005 UZ_{483}	—	October 1, 2005	Catalina	CSS	·	1.4 km	MPC · JPL
464944	2005 UY_{509}	—	October 23, 2005	Palomar	NEAT	·	1.5 km	MPC · JPL
464945	2005 US_{513}	—	October 22, 2005	Catalina	CSS	·	1.3 km	MPC · JPL
464946	2005 VN_{16}	—	November 3, 2005	Socorro	LINEAR	(5)	1.2 km	MPC · JPL
464947	2005 VS_{27}	—	October 24, 2005	Kitt Peak	Spacewatch	·	1.5 km	MPC · JPL
464948	2005 VE_{37}	—	September 30, 2005	Mount Lemmon	Mount Lemmon Survey	·	1.7 km	MPC · JPL
464949	2005 VT_{49}	—	November 2, 2005	Socorro	LINEAR	EUN	1.2 km	MPC · JPL
464950	2005 VE_{72}	—	November 1, 2005	Mount Lemmon	Mount Lemmon Survey	·	1.6 km	MPC · JPL
464951	2005 VU_{73}	—	November 6, 2005	Kitt Peak	Spacewatch	·	1.4 km	MPC · JPL
464952	2005 VZ_{81}	—	November 3, 2005	Catalina	CSS	EUN	1.2 km	MPC · JPL
464953	2005 VT_{128}	—	September 30, 2005	Anderson Mesa	LONEOS	·	1.3 km	MPC · JPL
464954	2005 WG_{9}	—	October 25, 2005	Mount Lemmon	Mount Lemmon Survey	·	1.4 km	MPC · JPL
464955	2005 WK_{11}	—	November 1, 2005	Kitt Peak	Spacewatch	AEO	810 m	MPC · JPL
464956	2005 WD_{15}	—	September 30, 2005	Mount Lemmon	Mount Lemmon Survey	·	1.7 km	MPC · JPL
464957	2005 WX_{15}	—	October 1, 2005	Mount Lemmon	Mount Lemmon Survey	3:2	4.7 km	MPC · JPL
464958	2005 WW_{36}	—	November 22, 2005	Kitt Peak	Spacewatch	·	2.0 km	MPC · JPL
464959	2005 WC_{73}	—	November 25, 2005	Kitt Peak	Spacewatch	·	2.1 km	MPC · JPL
464960	2005 WL_{86}	—	November 28, 2005	Mount Lemmon	Mount Lemmon Survey	·	1.5 km	MPC · JPL
464961	2005 WQ_{111}	—	November 6, 2005	Mount Lemmon	Mount Lemmon Survey	·	2.1 km	MPC · JPL
464962	2005 WC_{119}	—	November 26, 2005	Mount Lemmon	Mount Lemmon Survey	·	2.3 km	MPC · JPL
464963	2005 WS_{124}	—	November 25, 2005	Kitt Peak	Spacewatch	NEM	1.7 km	MPC · JPL
464964	2005 WJ_{133}	—	November 25, 2005	Mount Lemmon	Mount Lemmon Survey	·	1.2 km	MPC · JPL
464965	2005 WT_{155}	—	November 10, 2005	Catalina	CSS	·	1.4 km	MPC · JPL
464966	2005 WQ_{165}	—	October 31, 2005	Mount Lemmon	Mount Lemmon Survey	·	1.2 km	MPC · JPL
464967	2005 WU_{188}	—	November 6, 2005	Kitt Peak	Spacewatch	·	1.9 km	MPC · JPL
464968	2005 XN_{47}	—	December 2, 2005	Kitt Peak	Spacewatch	·	1.8 km	MPC · JPL
464969	2005 XE_{55}	—	December 5, 2005	Socorro	LINEAR	·	2.2 km	MPC · JPL
464970	2005 XW_{55}	—	November 25, 2005	Mount Lemmon	Mount Lemmon Survey	·	1.5 km	MPC · JPL
464971	2005 XF_{89}	—	November 26, 2005	Kitt Peak	Spacewatch	·	1.9 km	MPC · JPL
464972	2005 XT_{99}	—	October 22, 2005	Kitt Peak	Spacewatch	·	1.1 km	MPC · JPL
464973	2005 YW_{15}	—	December 22, 2005	Kitt Peak	Spacewatch	·	1.8 km	MPC · JPL
464974	2005 YB_{29}	—	December 24, 2005	Kitt Peak	Spacewatch	·	2.5 km	MPC · JPL
464975	2005 YH_{48}	—	December 22, 2005	Kitt Peak	Spacewatch	HOF	2.6 km	MPC · JPL
464976	2005 YO_{100}	—	December 6, 2005	Kitt Peak	Spacewatch	·	1.7 km	MPC · JPL
464977	2005 YQ_{195}	—	December 31, 2005	Kitt Peak	Spacewatch	·	1.7 km	MPC · JPL
464978	2005 YN_{203}	—	December 25, 2005	Mount Lemmon	Mount Lemmon Survey	·	2.4 km	MPC · JPL
464979	2005 YJ_{206}	—	December 27, 2005	Kitt Peak	Spacewatch	·	1.6 km	MPC · JPL
464980	2005 YW_{265}	—	November 25, 2005	Mount Lemmon	Mount Lemmon Survey	·	1.6 km	MPC · JPL
464981	2006 AQ_{11}	—	January 2, 2006	Mount Lemmon	Mount Lemmon Survey	GEF	1.2 km	MPC · JPL
464982	2006 AB_{14}	—	December 29, 2005	Kitt Peak	Spacewatch	EUN	1.2 km	MPC · JPL
464983	2006 AF_{91}	—	December 28, 2005	Mount Lemmon	Mount Lemmon Survey	·	1.5 km	MPC · JPL
464984	2006 AA_{97}	—	January 3, 2006	Socorro	LINEAR	·	520 m	MPC · JPL
464985	2006 BX_{24}	—	January 23, 2006	Mount Lemmon	Mount Lemmon Survey	·	2.2 km	MPC · JPL
464986	2006 BP_{26}	—	January 20, 2006	Kitt Peak	Spacewatch	HOF	2.6 km	MPC · JPL
464987	2006 BM_{73}	—	January 23, 2006	Kitt Peak	Spacewatch	·	2.0 km	MPC · JPL
464988	2006 BB_{77}	—	January 8, 2006	Mount Lemmon	Mount Lemmon Survey	DOR	1.8 km	MPC · JPL
464989	2006 BK_{102}	—	January 23, 2006	Mount Lemmon	Mount Lemmon Survey	·	2.0 km	MPC · JPL
464990	2006 BU_{113}	—	January 25, 2006	Kitt Peak	Spacewatch	·	1.7 km	MPC · JPL
464991	2006 BQ_{118}	—	January 26, 2006	Kitt Peak	Spacewatch	·	580 m	MPC · JPL
464992	2006 BN_{136}	—	January 28, 2006	Mount Lemmon	Mount Lemmon Survey	AGN	1.1 km	MPC · JPL
464993	2006 BK_{145}	—	January 23, 2006	Socorro	LINEAR	·	2.3 km	MPC · JPL
464994	2006 BD_{256}	—	January 27, 2006	Mount Lemmon	Mount Lemmon Survey	KOR	1.7 km	MPC · JPL
464995	2006 DE_{28}	—	February 20, 2006	Kitt Peak	Spacewatch	·	530 m	MPC · JPL
464996	2006 DC_{33}	—	February 7, 2006	Mount Lemmon	Mount Lemmon Survey	·	2.9 km	MPC · JPL
464997	2006 DA_{79}	—	February 24, 2006	Kitt Peak	Spacewatch	·	430 m	MPC · JPL
464998	2006 DS_{91}	—	February 24, 2006	Kitt Peak	Spacewatch	·	750 m	MPC · JPL
464999	2006 DB_{95}	—	February 24, 2006	Kitt Peak	Spacewatch	H	390 m	MPC · JPL
465000	2006 DX_{98}	—	February 25, 2006	Kitt Peak	Spacewatch	·	540 m	MPC · JPL

back to top

== Meaning of names ==
As minor planet discoveries are confirmed, they are given a permanent number by the IAU's Minor Planet Center (MPC), and the discoverers can then submit names for them, following the IAU's naming conventions. The list below concerns those minor planets in the specified number-range that have received names, and explains the meanings of those names.

Official naming citations of newly named small Solar System bodies are approved and published in a bulletin by IAU's Working Group for Small Bodies Nomenclature (WGSBN). Before May 2021, citations were published in MPC's Minor Planet Circulars for many decades. Recent citations can also be found on the JPL Small-Body Database (SBDB). Until his death in 2016, German astronomer Lutz D. Schmadel compiled these citations into the Dictionary of Minor Planet Names (DMP) and regularly updated the collection.

Based on Paul Herget's The Names of the Minor Planets, Schmadel also researched the unclear origin of numerous asteroids, most of which had been named prior to World War II. This article incorporates text from this source, which is in the public domain: SBDB New namings may only be added to this list below after official publication as the preannouncement of names is condemned. The WGSBN publishes a comprehensive guideline for the naming rules of non-cometary small Solar System bodies.

Named minor planet	Provisional	This minor planet was named for...	Ref · Catalog
464150 Kresken	2014 YN_{5}	Rainer Kresken (b. 1962), a German amateur astronomer.	IAU · 464150
464743 Stanislavkomárek	2003 PA_{11}	Stanislav Komárek (born 1958) is a Czech biologist, philosopher, writer and essayist. He has authored more than twenty books. His main focus is the history of biology, the relation between culture and nature, and biological aesthetics. Since 1990 he has served as a professor at Charles University in Prague.	JPL · 464743
464745 Péterrózsa	2003 RQ_{7}	Rózsa Péter (1905–1977) was a Hungarian mathematician and professor at Eötvös Loránd University, best known as the "founding mother of recursion theory".	IAU · 464745
