= Martin Connors =

Canadian astronomerprofessor

Martin Gerard Connors (born 1954) is a Canadian astronomer, space physicist, author and professor.

== Career ==
Connors received a PhD in Physics from the University of Alberta in 1998. He is a Professor at Athabasca University. He tutors and develops courses in Mathematics, Physics, and Astronomy. He was part of the team credited with the discovery of the first Earth trojan asteroid, an asteroid that orbits the Sun on a similar orbital path as that of Earth. The 300-meter-diameter asteroid was designated 2010 TK7. The asteroid was discovered in October 2010 by the NEOWISE team of astronomers using NASA's Wide-field Infrared Survey Explorer (WISE). Connors himself is credited with the near-Earth and Apollo asteroid (464639) 2000 PO_{30}, which he co-discovered together with astronomer Christian Veillet at the Mauna Kea Observatories in August 2000. He was co-discoverer of the orbital properties of the "retrograde Trojan" 514107 Kaʻepaokaʻāwela.

Connors' first book "Invisible Solar System" was published by Taylor and Francis/CRC Press in 2024.

== Awards and honors ==
The asteroid 13700 Connors, discovered by the Spacewatch survey in 1998, was named in his honor. He held a Canada Research Chair at Athabasca University and has received that organization's teaching and research awards.

== See also ==
- List of minor planet discoverers § M. Connors
