= List of minor planets: 608001–609000 =

The following is a partial list of minor planets, running from minor-planet number 608001 through 609000, inclusive. The primary data for this and other partial lists is based on JPL's "Small-Body Orbital Elements" and data available from the Minor Planet Center. Critical list information is also provided by the MPC, unless otherwise specified from Lowell Observatory. A detailed description of the table's columns and additional sources are given on the main page including a complete list of every page in this series, and a statistical break-up on the dynamical classification of minor planets.

Also see the summary list of all named bodies in numerical and alphabetical order, and the corresponding naming citations for the number range of this particular list. New namings may only be added to this list after official publication, as the preannouncement of names is condemned by the Working Group for Small Bodies Nomenclature of the International Astronomical Union.

Near-Earth obj.	MBA (inner)	MBA (outer)	Centaur
Mars-crosser	MBA (middle)	Jupiter trojan	Trans-Neptunian obj.
Unclassified

== 608001–608100 ==
Designation			Discovery			Properties		Ref
Permanent	Provisional	Named after	Date	Site	Discoverer(s)	Category	Diam.	Ref
608001	2002 TG_{380}	—	October 6, 2002	Palomar	NEAT	T_{j} (2.98)	3.6 km	MPC · JPL
608002	2002 TN_{380}	—	March 8, 2005	Mount Lemmon	Mount Lemmon Survey	·	1.7 km	MPC · JPL
608003	2002 TT_{383}	—	September 30, 2006	Mount Lemmon	Mount Lemmon Survey	·	870 m	MPC · JPL
608004	2002 TZ_{384}	—	October 5, 2002	Apache Point	SDSS	·	1.6 km	MPC · JPL
608005	2002 TF_{386}	—	November 3, 2007	Kitt Peak	Spacewatch	AGN	860 m	MPC · JPL
608006	2002 TW_{386}	—	October 8, 2002	Palomar	NEAT	·	2.4 km	MPC · JPL
608007	2002 TM_{387}	—	March 19, 2009	Mount Lemmon	Mount Lemmon Survey	PAD	1.5 km	MPC · JPL
608008	2002 TX_{388}	—	September 4, 2011	Haleakala	Pan-STARRS 1	·	1.4 km	MPC · JPL
608009	2002 TE_{389}	—	October 6, 2002	Palomar	NEAT	·	1.3 km	MPC · JPL
608010	2002 TH_{389}	—	November 19, 2006	Kitt Peak	Spacewatch	MAS	720 m	MPC · JPL
608011	2002 TW_{389}	—	November 17, 2006	Kitt Peak	Spacewatch	·	1.2 km	MPC · JPL
608012	2002 TL_{390}	—	February 13, 2011	Mount Lemmon	Mount Lemmon Survey	·	900 m	MPC · JPL
608013	2002 TO_{390}	—	April 9, 2014	Mount Lemmon	Mount Lemmon Survey	EUN	1.3 km	MPC · JPL
608014	2002 TL_{391}	—	September 24, 2011	Catalina	CSS	·	1.5 km	MPC · JPL
608015	2002 TM_{393}	—	September 24, 2011	Haleakala	Pan-STARRS 1	·	1.5 km	MPC · JPL
608016	2002 TN_{394}	—	October 15, 2002	Palomar	NEAT	·	1.8 km	MPC · JPL
608017	2002 UZ_{30}	—	October 29, 2002	Kitt Peak	Spacewatch	APO	370 m	MPC · JPL
608018	2002 UN_{71}	—	February 10, 2013	Haleakala	Pan-STARRS 1	GEF	1.0 km	MPC · JPL
608019	2002 UQ_{76}	—	October 29, 2002	Palomar	NEAT	·	820 m	MPC · JPL
608020	2002 UN_{77}	—	October 18, 2002	Palomar	NEAT	TIN	1.1 km	MPC · JPL
608021	2002 UK_{78}	—	September 18, 2007	Mount Lemmon	Mount Lemmon Survey	AGN	1.2 km	MPC · JPL
608022	2002 UR_{78}	—	October 28, 2002	Palomar	NEAT	·	1.1 km	MPC · JPL
608023	2002 VA_{2}	—	November 2, 2002	Haleakala	NEAT	·	1.9 km	MPC · JPL
608024	2002 VA_{15}	—	November 6, 2002	Needville	Needville	·	1.5 km	MPC · JPL
608025	2002 VW_{98}	—	November 1, 2002	La Palma	A. Fitzsimmons	·	1.9 km	MPC · JPL
608026	2002 VN_{107}	—	November 1, 2002	Palomar	NEAT	·	2.6 km	MPC · JPL
608027	2002 VA_{124}	—	November 5, 2002	Socorro	LINEAR	·	1.5 km	MPC · JPL
608028	2002 VZ_{129}	—	November 4, 2002	Kitt Peak	Spacewatch	AST	1.4 km	MPC · JPL
608029	2002 VA_{136}	—	November 14, 2002	Socorro	LINEAR	·	2.3 km	MPC · JPL
608030	2002 VH_{141}	—	September 4, 2011	Haleakala	Pan-STARRS 1	MRX	740 m	MPC · JPL
608031	2002 VT_{142}	—	November 5, 2002	Palomar	NEAT	·	1.1 km	MPC · JPL
608032	2002 VE_{145}	—	November 4, 2002	Palomar	NEAT	·	1.5 km	MPC · JPL
608033	2002 VG_{145}	—	November 4, 2002	Palomar	NEAT	NYS	910 m	MPC · JPL
608034	2002 VS_{148}	—	June 18, 2006	Siding Spring	SSS	·	2.7 km	MPC · JPL
608035	2002 VW_{149}	—	November 6, 2002	Anderson Mesa	LONEOS	·	2.2 km	MPC · JPL
608036	2002 VL_{150}	—	October 2, 2013	Catalina	CSS	PHO	960 m	MPC · JPL
608037	2002 VZ_{150}	—	March 23, 2014	Kitt Peak	Spacewatch	·	1.7 km	MPC · JPL
608038	2002 VE_{151}	—	November 3, 2007	Kitt Peak	Spacewatch	·	1.3 km	MPC · JPL
608039	2002 VG_{151}	—	January 23, 2011	Mount Lemmon	Mount Lemmon Survey	NYS	1.0 km	MPC · JPL
608040	2002 VH_{151}	—	October 25, 2016	Haleakala	Pan-STARRS 1	·	1.4 km	MPC · JPL
608041	2002 VP_{152}	—	October 3, 2013	Haleakala	Pan-STARRS 1	CLA	1.4 km	MPC · JPL
608042	2002 VF_{153}	—	April 29, 2014	Haleakala	Pan-STARRS 1	·	1.6 km	MPC · JPL
608043	2002 VJ_{153}	—	February 28, 2009	Mount Lemmon	Mount Lemmon Survey	HOF	2.1 km	MPC · JPL
608044	2002 VL_{153}	—	September 22, 2009	Kitt Peak	Spacewatch	CLA	1.1 km	MPC · JPL
608045	2002 VF_{154}	—	October 2, 2013	Haleakala	Pan-STARRS 1	NYS	940 m	MPC · JPL
608046	2002 WA_{7}	—	November 16, 2002	Palomar	NEAT	NYS	1.0 km	MPC · JPL
608047	2002 WB_{21}	—	November 24, 2002	Palomar	NEAT	·	1.8 km	MPC · JPL
608048	2002 WW_{26}	—	November 22, 2002	Palomar	NEAT	·	2.3 km	MPC · JPL
608049	2002 WF_{29}	—	November 22, 2002	Palomar	NEAT	H	560 m	MPC · JPL
608050	2002 WP_{30}	—	November 24, 2002	Palomar	NEAT	·	980 m	MPC · JPL
608051	2002 WT_{30}	—	November 7, 2002	Kitt Peak	Spacewatch	·	1.8 km	MPC · JPL
608052	2002 WW_{31}	—	February 13, 2011	Mount Lemmon	Mount Lemmon Survey	·	1.1 km	MPC · JPL
608053	2002 WW_{32}	—	September 28, 2009	Mount Lemmon	Mount Lemmon Survey	·	990 m	MPC · JPL
608054	2002 XA_{99}	—	November 12, 2002	Socorro	LINEAR	·	2.0 km	MPC · JPL
608055	2002 XR_{108}	—	December 6, 2002	Socorro	LINEAR	·	2.3 km	MPC · JPL
608056	2002 XB_{118}	—	January 27, 2007	Kitt Peak	Spacewatch	·	930 m	MPC · JPL
608057	2002 XF_{120}	—	November 23, 2006	Mount Lemmon	Mount Lemmon Survey	·	1.1 km	MPC · JPL
608058	2002 XU_{121}	—	October 1, 2005	Kitt Peak	Spacewatch	·	570 m	MPC · JPL
608059	2002 XA_{122}	—	April 4, 2008	Kitt Peak	Spacewatch	PHO	700 m	MPC · JPL
608060	2002 XB_{124}	—	April 7, 2014	Kitt Peak	Spacewatch	KOR	1.0 km	MPC · JPL
608061	2002 YS_{13}	—	December 31, 2002	Socorro	LINEAR	·	1.5 km	MPC · JPL
608062	2003 AB_{71}	—	January 10, 2003	Kitt Peak	Spacewatch	·	1.4 km	MPC · JPL
608063	2003 AA_{95}	—	November 19, 2008	Kitt Peak	Spacewatch	·	4.0 km	MPC · JPL
608064	2003 AC_{95}	—	February 6, 2007	Kitt Peak	Spacewatch	·	840 m	MPC · JPL
608065	2003 BM_{5}	—	January 24, 2003	La Silla	A. Boattini, Hainaut, O.	·	1.5 km	MPC · JPL
608066	2003 BG_{45}	—	January 27, 2003	Kitt Peak	Spacewatch	KOR	1.6 km	MPC · JPL
608067	2003 BC_{58}	—	January 27, 2003	Socorro	LINEAR	·	1.1 km	MPC · JPL
608068	2003 BX_{74}	—	January 24, 2003	Palomar	NEAT	·	2.0 km	MPC · JPL
608069	2003 BK_{76}	—	January 29, 2003	Palomar	NEAT	H	650 m	MPC · JPL
608070	2003 BZ_{76}	—	January 29, 2003	Palomar	NEAT	·	1.9 km	MPC · JPL
608071	2003 BK_{94}	—	October 14, 2009	Mount Lemmon	Mount Lemmon Survey	·	1.5 km	MPC · JPL
608072	2003 BG_{95}	—	January 4, 2016	Haleakala	Pan-STARRS 1	·	560 m	MPC · JPL
608073	2003 BV_{95}	—	September 19, 2014	Haleakala	Pan-STARRS 1	·	790 m	MPC · JPL
608074	2003 BC_{96}	—	September 4, 2010	Mount Lemmon	Mount Lemmon Survey	·	1.6 km	MPC · JPL
608075	2003 BF_{96}	—	January 8, 2016	Haleakala	Pan-STARRS 1	·	610 m	MPC · JPL
608076	2003 BV_{102}	—	November 17, 2011	Mount Lemmon	Mount Lemmon Survey	·	1.6 km	MPC · JPL
608077	2003 CQ_{27}	—	April 15, 2015	iTelescope	Dawson, B. C.	·	1.3 km	MPC · JPL
608078	2003 DM_{25}	—	February 23, 2003	Campo Imperatore	CINEOS	·	1 km	MPC · JPL
608079	2003 EG_{65}	—	February 9, 2008	Kitt Peak	Spacewatch	KOR	1.3 km	MPC · JPL
608080	2003 EL_{65}	—	March 20, 2007	Kitt Peak	Spacewatch	·	1.4 km	MPC · JPL
608081	2003 EP_{65}	—	March 11, 2003	Kitt Peak	Spacewatch	KOR	1.2 km	MPC · JPL
608082	2003 FG_{127}	—	March 31, 2003	Kitt Peak	Deep Ecliptic Survey	KOR	1.2 km	MPC · JPL
608083	2003 FG_{134}	—	March 31, 2003	Kitt Peak	Spacewatch	·	760 m	MPC · JPL
608084	2003 FO_{134}	—	March 30, 2003	Kitt Peak	Deep Ecliptic Survey	·	630 m	MPC · JPL
608085	2003 FA_{135}	—	March 6, 2013	Haleakala	Pan-STARRS 1	·	630 m	MPC · JPL
608086	2003 FW_{136}	—	June 5, 2014	Haleakala	Pan-STARRS 1	·	2.0 km	MPC · JPL
608087	2003 FM_{137}	—	March 31, 2003	Kitt Peak	Spacewatch	·	560 m	MPC · JPL
608088	2003 FU_{137}	—	May 21, 2014	Haleakala	Pan-STARRS 1	KOR	1.4 km	MPC · JPL
608089	2003 FD_{138}	—	March 24, 2003	Kitt Peak	Spacewatch	NYS	1.1 km	MPC · JPL
608090	2003 FN_{138}	—	March 2, 2008	Mount Lemmon	Mount Lemmon Survey	·	2.3 km	MPC · JPL
608091	2003 FN_{139}	—	March 19, 2013	Haleakala	Pan-STARRS 1	KOR	1.2 km	MPC · JPL
608092	2003 FP_{140}	—	March 4, 2008	Kitt Peak	Spacewatch	·	1.6 km	MPC · JPL
608093	2003 GG_{52}	—	April 5, 2003	Kitt Peak	Spacewatch	·	760 m	MPC · JPL
608094	2003 GQ_{57}	—	February 16, 2015	Haleakala	Pan-STARRS 1	L4	7.1 km	MPC · JPL
608095	2003 GA_{59}	—	February 11, 2011	Mount Lemmon	Mount Lemmon Survey	·	1.2 km	MPC · JPL
608096	2003 GR_{59}	—	April 11, 2003	Kitt Peak	Spacewatch	·	1.5 km	MPC · JPL
608097	2003 GE_{60}	—	March 31, 2008	Mount Lemmon	Mount Lemmon Survey	EOS	1.8 km	MPC · JPL
608098	2003 GN_{60}	—	June 20, 2010	Mount Lemmon	Mount Lemmon Survey	·	580 m	MPC · JPL
608099	2003 GX_{60}	—	March 19, 2013	Haleakala	Pan-STARRS 1	·	490 m	MPC · JPL
608100	2003 GY_{60}	—	February 17, 2015	Haleakala	Pan-STARRS 1	·	850 m	MPC · JPL

== 608101–608200 ==
back to top

Designation			Discovery			Properties		Ref
Permanent	Provisional	Named after	Date	Site	Discoverer(s)	Category	Diam.	Ref
608101	2003 GU_{61}	—	April 10, 2003	Kitt Peak	Spacewatch	EOS	1.6 km	MPC · JPL
608102	2003 GA_{62}	—	September 29, 2010	Mount Lemmon	Mount Lemmon Survey	·	1.5 km	MPC · JPL
608103	2003 GB_{62}	—	February 10, 2016	Haleakala	Pan-STARRS 1	·	560 m	MPC · JPL
608104	2003 GG_{62}	—	January 26, 2012	Haleakala	Pan-STARRS 1	L4	6.5 km	MPC · JPL
608105	2003 GA_{63}	—	February 14, 2013	Haleakala	Pan-STARRS 1	·	1.5 km	MPC · JPL
608106	2003 GK_{64}	—	March 3, 2008	Mount Lemmon	Mount Lemmon Survey	·	1.6 km	MPC · JPL
608107	2003 GZ_{64}	—	October 1, 2015	Mount Lemmon	Mount Lemmon Survey	EOS	1.5 km	MPC · JPL
608108	2003 GG_{65}	—	October 9, 2008	Mount Lemmon	Mount Lemmon Survey	L4	6.6 km	MPC · JPL
608109	2003 GK_{66}	—	April 1, 2003	Kitt Peak	Deep Ecliptic Survey	KON	1.4 km	MPC · JPL
608110	2003 HB_{25}	—	April 25, 2003	Kitt Peak	Spacewatch	·	460 m	MPC · JPL
608111	2003 HA_{26}	—	April 25, 2003	Kitt Peak	Spacewatch	·	540 m	MPC · JPL
608112	2003 HF_{59}	—	January 29, 2012	Mount Lemmon	Mount Lemmon Survey	·	860 m	MPC · JPL
608113	2003 HV_{59}	—	April 15, 2013	Haleakala	Pan-STARRS 1	·	600 m	MPC · JPL
608114	2003 HF_{60}	—	November 12, 2010	Kitt Peak	Spacewatch	L4	8.5 km	MPC · JPL
608115	2003 HT_{60}	—	April 24, 2003	Kitt Peak	Spacewatch	·	530 m	MPC · JPL
608116	2003 HX_{60}	—	March 31, 2008	Kitt Peak	Spacewatch	·	1.5 km	MPC · JPL
608117	2003 HC_{61}	—	January 23, 2015	Haleakala	Pan-STARRS 1	MAR	1.0 km	MPC · JPL
608118	2003 HE_{61}	—	April 11, 2008	Kitt Peak	Spacewatch	EOS	1.7 km	MPC · JPL
608119	2003 HM_{61}	—	April 30, 2003	Kitt Peak	Spacewatch	·	550 m	MPC · JPL
608120	2003 HX_{61}	—	October 13, 2015	Haleakala	Pan-STARRS 1	H	450 m	MPC · JPL
608121	2003 HV_{62}	—	April 16, 2007	Catalina	CSS	RAF	1.0 km	MPC · JPL
608122	2003 HE_{63}	—	April 30, 2003	Kitt Peak	Spacewatch	·	2.2 km	MPC · JPL
608123	2003 HF_{63}	—	October 8, 2004	Anderson Mesa	LONEOS	·	2.6 km	MPC · JPL
608124	2003 HO_{63}	—	February 28, 2008	Kitt Peak	Spacewatch	·	1.9 km	MPC · JPL
608125	2003 HQ_{63}	—	February 11, 2016	Haleakala	Pan-STARRS 1	·	590 m	MPC · JPL
608126	2003 HT_{63}	—	March 13, 2008	Kitt Peak	Spacewatch	·	1.7 km	MPC · JPL
608127	2003 HR_{64}	—	July 7, 2016	Haleakala	Pan-STARRS 1	·	1.2 km	MPC · JPL
608128	2003 HQ_{65}	—	April 29, 2003	Kitt Peak	Spacewatch	·	670 m	MPC · JPL
608129	2003 HV_{65}	—	April 25, 2003	Kitt Peak	Spacewatch	·	1.2 km	MPC · JPL
608130	2003 JW	—	May 1, 2003	Kitt Peak	Spacewatch	·	1.6 km	MPC · JPL
608131	2003 JU_{18}	—	November 1, 2011	Mount Lemmon	Mount Lemmon Survey	·	580 m	MPC · JPL
608132	2003 JE_{19}	—	May 1, 2003	Kitt Peak	Spacewatch	·	1.8 km	MPC · JPL
608133	2003 JG_{19}	—	November 30, 2005	Kitt Peak	Spacewatch	·	1.2 km	MPC · JPL
608134	2003 KD_{8}	—	May 23, 2003	Kitt Peak	Spacewatch	T_{j} (2.96)	2.1 km	MPC · JPL
608135	2003 KD_{31}	—	May 26, 2003	Kitt Peak	Spacewatch	·	910 m	MPC · JPL
608136	2003 KW_{36}	—	January 9, 2014	Haleakala	Pan-STARRS 1	·	1.2 km	MPC · JPL
608137	2003 KM_{38}	—	May 26, 2014	Haleakala	Pan-STARRS 1	·	2.2 km	MPC · JPL
608138	2003 KX_{38}	—	February 16, 2015	Haleakala	Pan-STARRS 1	MAR	810 m	MPC · JPL
608139	2003 LO_{8}	—	June 2, 2003	Cerro Tololo	Deep Ecliptic Survey	·	1.2 km	MPC · JPL
608140	2003 LS_{9}	—	April 13, 2008	Mount Lemmon	Mount Lemmon Survey	·	2.0 km	MPC · JPL
608141	2003 LU_{9}	—	November 29, 2005	Kitt Peak	Spacewatch	·	1.3 km	MPC · JPL
608142	2003 LZ_{9}	—	October 14, 2009	Bergisch Gladbach	W. Bickel	·	2.5 km	MPC · JPL
608143	2003 LO_{10}	—	January 23, 2018	Mount Lemmon	Mount Lemmon Survey	·	2.0 km	MPC · JPL
608144	2003 LB_{11}	—	April 15, 2008	Mount Lemmon	Mount Lemmon Survey	·	2.0 km	MPC · JPL
608145	2003 LF_{11}	—	October 8, 2015	Mount Lemmon	Mount Lemmon Survey	·	1.8 km	MPC · JPL
608146	2003 MZ_{6}	—	May 28, 2003	Kitt Peak	Spacewatch	·	1.5 km	MPC · JPL
608147	2003 MT_{7}	—	June 27, 2003	Nogales	P. R. Holvorcem, M. Schwartz	ADE	2.0 km	MPC · JPL
608148	2003 ME_{13}	—	June 22, 2003	Mauna Kea	Burdullis, T., Martin, P.	·	1.3 km	MPC · JPL
608149	2003 ML_{13}	—	August 13, 2010	Kitt Peak	Spacewatch	·	530 m	MPC · JPL
608150	2003 ND_{13}	—	July 9, 2003	Mount Graham	Ryan, W., Martinez, C.	TIR	2.6 km	MPC · JPL
608151	2003 NP_{13}	—	July 8, 2003	Palomar	NEAT	·	640 m	MPC · JPL
608152	2003 NR_{13}	—	November 20, 2008	Kitt Peak	Spacewatch	(5)	1.1 km	MPC · JPL
608153	2003 NL_{14}	—	January 19, 2012	Haleakala	Pan-STARRS 1	·	2.2 km	MPC · JPL
608154	2003 NV_{14}	—	March 5, 2013	Haleakala	Pan-STARRS 1	·	2.0 km	MPC · JPL
608155	2003 OM_{3}	—	July 22, 2003	Haleakala	NEAT	MAR	1.3 km	MPC · JPL
608156	2003 OZ_{7}	—	July 26, 2003	Socorro	LINEAR	·	1.3 km	MPC · JPL
608157	2003 OV_{15}	—	July 23, 2003	Palomar	NEAT	EUN	980 m	MPC · JPL
608158	2003 OA_{18}	—	July 28, 2003	Cerro Tololo	I. P. Griffin, Miranda, A.	·	1.1 km	MPC · JPL
608159	2003 OU_{21}	—	July 8, 2003	Palomar	NEAT	·	1.4 km	MPC · JPL
608160	2003 OQ_{23}	—	July 22, 2003	Campo Imperatore	CINEOS	·	3.3 km	MPC · JPL
608161	2003 OP_{30}	—	July 25, 2003	Palomar	NEAT	·	1.3 km	MPC · JPL
608162	2003 OF_{33}	—	July 22, 2003	Haleakala	NEAT	·	3.7 km	MPC · JPL
608163	2003 OE_{35}	—	November 11, 2010	Mount Lemmon	Mount Lemmon Survey	·	3.8 km	MPC · JPL
608164	2003 OF_{35}	—	July 23, 2003	Palomar	NEAT	·	1.1 km	MPC · JPL
608165	2003 OP_{35}	—	November 1, 2007	Kitt Peak	Spacewatch	·	710 m	MPC · JPL
608166	2003 PT_{10}	—	August 5, 2003	Kitt Peak	Spacewatch	BAR	1.0 km	MPC · JPL
608167	2003 PL_{13}	—	August 4, 2003	Kitt Peak	Spacewatch	·	570 m	MPC · JPL
608168	2003 PR_{13}	—	August 4, 2003	Kitt Peak	Spacewatch	·	2.6 km	MPC · JPL
608169	2003 QR_{10}	—	July 25, 2003	Palomar	NEAT	ADE	2.2 km	MPC · JPL
608170	2003 QY_{13}	—	August 19, 2003	Campo Imperatore	CINEOS	·	2.3 km	MPC · JPL
608171	2003 QB_{39}	—	August 22, 2003	Palomar	NEAT	·	2.9 km	MPC · JPL
608172	2003 QD_{50}	—	August 22, 2003	Palomar	NEAT	·	1.5 km	MPC · JPL
608173	2003 QN_{71}	—	July 26, 2003	Campo Imperatore	CINEOS	·	3.3 km	MPC · JPL
608174	2003 QE_{74}	—	July 23, 2003	Palomar	NEAT	JUN	990 m	MPC · JPL
608175	2003 QB_{84}	—	August 24, 2003	Cerro Tololo	Deep Ecliptic Survey	·	1.4 km	MPC · JPL
608176	2003 QD_{90}	—	August 26, 2003	Cerro Tololo	Deep Ecliptic Survey	·	1.0 km	MPC · JPL
608177	2003 QP_{105}	—	August 31, 2003	Črni Vrh	Mikuž, H.	MAR	1.2 km	MPC · JPL
608178	2003 QO_{117}	—	August 26, 2003	Cerro Tololo	Deep Ecliptic Survey	·	1.1 km	MPC · JPL
608179	2003 QN_{120}	—	August 23, 2003	Palomar	NEAT	·	1.9 km	MPC · JPL
608180	2003 QR_{120}	—	August 28, 2003	Palomar	NEAT	V	480 m	MPC · JPL
608181	2003 QT_{120}	—	August 28, 2003	Palomar	NEAT	·	610 m	MPC · JPL
608182	2003 QB_{121}	—	October 1, 2016	Mount Bigelow	CSS	·	1.8 km	MPC · JPL
608183	2003 QM_{121}	—	March 17, 2005	Mount Lemmon	Mount Lemmon Survey	·	1.1 km	MPC · JPL
608184	2003 QS_{122}	—	December 15, 2014	Mount Lemmon	Mount Lemmon Survey	·	570 m	MPC · JPL
608185	2003 QZ_{122}	—	August 26, 2003	Cerro Tololo	Deep Ecliptic Survey	·	720 m	MPC · JPL
608186	2003 QB_{123}	—	October 18, 2012	Haleakala	Pan-STARRS 1	·	930 m	MPC · JPL
608187	2003 QC_{123}	—	November 5, 2007	Mount Lemmon	Mount Lemmon Survey	·	660 m	MPC · JPL
608188	2003 QN_{123}	—	December 13, 2010	Mount Lemmon	Mount Lemmon Survey	EOS	1.8 km	MPC · JPL
608189	2003 QT_{123}	—	March 16, 2010	Mount Lemmon	Mount Lemmon Survey	·	1.0 km	MPC · JPL
608190	2003 QM_{124}	—	August 26, 2003	Cerro Tololo	Deep Ecliptic Survey	·	2.5 km	MPC · JPL
608191	2003 QZ_{124}	—	August 22, 2003	Palomar	NEAT	BAR	1.1 km	MPC · JPL
608192	2003 RA_{17}	—	September 15, 2003	Palomar	NEAT	·	2.5 km	MPC · JPL
608193	2003 RZ_{27}	—	September 6, 2003	Campo Imperatore	CINEOS	ADE	1.7 km	MPC · JPL
608194	2003 RB_{28}	—	September 16, 2012	Kitt Peak	Spacewatch	·	1.1 km	MPC · JPL
608195	2003 SR	—	September 16, 2003	Kitt Peak	Spacewatch	VER	2.2 km	MPC · JPL
608196	2003 SL_{2}	—	September 16, 2003	Kitt Peak	Spacewatch	JUN	950 m	MPC · JPL
608197	2003 SE_{16}	—	September 17, 2003	Kitt Peak	Spacewatch	T_{j} (2.99)	2.4 km	MPC · JPL
608198	2003 SP_{16}	—	September 17, 2003	Kitt Peak	Spacewatch	·	2.8 km	MPC · JPL
608199	2003 SV_{18}	—	September 16, 2003	Kitt Peak	Spacewatch	·	1.2 km	MPC · JPL
608200	2003 SN_{21}	—	September 16, 2003	Kitt Peak	Spacewatch	·	2.2 km	MPC · JPL

== 608201–608300 ==
back to top

Designation			Discovery			Properties		Ref
Permanent	Provisional	Named after	Date	Site	Discoverer(s)	Category	Diam.	Ref
608201	2003 ST_{21}	—	September 16, 2003	Kitt Peak	Spacewatch	·	3.2 km	MPC · JPL
608202	2003 SJ_{28}	—	September 18, 2003	Palomar	NEAT	·	1.7 km	MPC · JPL
608203	2003 ST_{37}	—	September 16, 2003	Palomar	NEAT	·	2.9 km	MPC · JPL
608204	2003 SK_{78}	—	September 19, 2003	Kitt Peak	Spacewatch	·	2.6 km	MPC · JPL
608205	2003 SH_{92}	—	September 18, 2003	Kitt Peak	Spacewatch	·	660 m	MPC · JPL
608206	2003 SN_{96}	—	September 19, 2003	Palomar	NEAT	·	1.9 km	MPC · JPL
608207	2003 ST_{96}	—	September 19, 2003	Kitt Peak	Spacewatch	·	2.4 km	MPC · JPL
608208	2003 SU_{102}	—	September 20, 2003	Kitt Peak	Spacewatch	·	1.9 km	MPC · JPL
608209	2003 SV_{102}	—	September 20, 2003	Kitt Peak	Spacewatch	·	3.1 km	MPC · JPL
608210	2003 SJ_{109}	—	September 20, 2003	Kitt Peak	Spacewatch	·	2.7 km	MPC · JPL
608211	2003 SH_{112}	—	September 16, 2003	Kitt Peak	Spacewatch	·	2.1 km	MPC · JPL
608212	2003 SL_{118}	—	September 16, 2003	Kitt Peak	Spacewatch	·	2.3 km	MPC · JPL
608213	2003 SP_{120}	—	September 17, 2003	Palomar	NEAT	MAR	920 m	MPC · JPL
608214	2003 SG_{121}	—	September 17, 2003	Kitt Peak	Spacewatch	·	2.6 km	MPC · JPL
608215	2003 SQ_{149}	—	September 17, 2003	Palomar	NEAT	·	1.2 km	MPC · JPL
608216	2003 SX_{158}	—	September 19, 2003	Kitt Peak	Spacewatch	EUN	920 m	MPC · JPL
608217	2003 SB_{178}	—	September 19, 2003	Palomar	NEAT	·	1.7 km	MPC · JPL
608218	2003 SW_{183}	—	September 20, 2003	Socorro	LINEAR	·	1.2 km	MPC · JPL
608219	2003 SH_{184}	—	September 21, 2003	Kitt Peak	Spacewatch	·	1.3 km	MPC · JPL
608220	2003 SX_{194}	—	September 20, 2003	Palomar	NEAT	·	1.3 km	MPC · JPL
608221	2003 SE_{196}	—	September 20, 2003	Palomar	NEAT	·	2.2 km	MPC · JPL
608222	2003 SD_{207}	—	September 26, 2003	Socorro	LINEAR	·	1.5 km	MPC · JPL
608223	2003 SK_{211}	—	August 28, 2003	Palomar	NEAT	·	1.9 km	MPC · JPL
608224	2003 ST_{241}	—	September 27, 2003	Kitt Peak	Spacewatch	·	1.2 km	MPC · JPL
608225	2003 SB_{242}	—	September 18, 2003	Kitt Peak	Spacewatch	·	2.3 km	MPC · JPL
608226	2003 SY_{242}	—	September 27, 2003	Kitt Peak	Spacewatch	·	640 m	MPC · JPL
608227	2003 SR_{256}	—	September 4, 2003	Kitt Peak	Spacewatch	·	610 m	MPC · JPL
608228	2003 SB_{262}	—	September 21, 2003	Kitt Peak	Spacewatch	·	630 m	MPC · JPL
608229	2003 SD_{267}	—	September 29, 2003	Kitt Peak	Spacewatch	·	3.4 km	MPC · JPL
608230	2003 SV_{268}	—	September 30, 2003	Kitt Peak	Spacewatch	VER	3.0 km	MPC · JPL
608231	2003 SV_{271}	—	December 16, 1999	Kitt Peak	Spacewatch	·	1.8 km	MPC · JPL
608232	2003 SX_{271}	—	September 26, 2003	Goodricke-Pigott	R. A. Tucker	·	1.5 km	MPC · JPL
608233	2003 SL_{274}	—	September 28, 2003	Kitt Peak	Spacewatch	·	1.0 km	MPC · JPL
608234	2003 SB_{278}	—	September 20, 2003	Palomar	NEAT	·	1.3 km	MPC · JPL
608235	2003 SK_{287}	—	September 29, 2003	Kitt Peak	Spacewatch	·	1.1 km	MPC · JPL
608236	2003 SO_{302}	—	September 19, 2003	Kitt Peak	Spacewatch	·	1.6 km	MPC · JPL
608237	2003 SP_{310}	—	September 28, 2003	Kitt Peak	Spacewatch	·	2.2 km	MPC · JPL
608238	2003 SY_{311}	—	September 17, 2003	Kitt Peak	Spacewatch	(194)	1.2 km	MPC · JPL
608239	2003 SP_{324}	—	September 17, 2003	Kitt Peak	Spacewatch	·	1.2 km	MPC · JPL
608240	2003 SM_{326}	—	September 18, 2003	Kitt Peak	Spacewatch	·	2.8 km	MPC · JPL
608241	2003 SN_{329}	—	September 22, 2003	Palomar	NEAT	·	590 m	MPC · JPL
608242	2003 SX_{333}	—	September 18, 2003	Kitt Peak	Spacewatch	·	1.4 km	MPC · JPL
608243	2003 SJ_{334}	—	September 29, 2003	Kitt Peak	Spacewatch	·	1.4 km	MPC · JPL
608244	2003 SD_{340}	—	September 28, 2003	Apache Point	SDSS Collaboration	·	1.4 km	MPC · JPL
608245	2003 SD_{341}	—	January 15, 2005	Kitt Peak	Spacewatch	·	1.2 km	MPC · JPL
608246	2003 SX_{343}	—	September 19, 2003	Palomar	NEAT	·	790 m	MPC · JPL
608247	2003 SJ_{344}	—	February 2, 2005	Kitt Peak	Spacewatch	·	1.1 km	MPC · JPL
608248	2003 SB_{345}	—	August 28, 2003	Palomar	NEAT	·	580 m	MPC · JPL
608249	2003 SC_{347}	—	September 18, 2003	Kitt Peak	Spacewatch	·	500 m	MPC · JPL
608250	2003 SE_{347}	—	September 18, 2003	Kitt Peak	Spacewatch	·	2.0 km	MPC · JPL
608251	2003 SQ_{348}	—	September 18, 2003	Kitt Peak	Spacewatch	·	1.3 km	MPC · JPL
608252	2003 SF_{349}	—	September 18, 2003	Kitt Peak	Spacewatch	·	640 m	MPC · JPL
608253	2003 SJ_{349}	—	September 18, 2003	Kitt Peak	Spacewatch	·	1.1 km	MPC · JPL
608254	2003 SV_{349}	—	September 18, 2003	Kitt Peak	Spacewatch	THM	1.9 km	MPC · JPL
608255	2003 SW_{354}	—	September 23, 2003	Palomar	NEAT	·	740 m	MPC · JPL
608256	2003 SL_{355}	—	September 25, 2003	Palomar	NEAT	·	1.3 km	MPC · JPL
608257	2003 SP_{355}	—	September 26, 2003	Socorro	LINEAR	·	2.7 km	MPC · JPL
608258	2003 SQ_{356}	—	September 18, 2003	Kitt Peak	Spacewatch	EUN	920 m	MPC · JPL
608259	2003 SF_{359}	—	September 21, 2003	Kitt Peak	Spacewatch	·	1.6 km	MPC · JPL
608260	2003 SE_{362}	—	September 22, 2003	Kitt Peak	Spacewatch	·	2.8 km	MPC · JPL
608261	2003 SS_{362}	—	September 22, 2003	Kitt Peak	Spacewatch	·	2.5 km	MPC · JPL
608262	2003 SX_{364}	—	September 26, 2003	Apache Point	SDSS Collaboration	·	2.5 km	MPC · JPL
608263	2003 SZ_{364}	—	September 26, 2003	Apache Point	SDSS Collaboration	·	2.5 km	MPC · JPL
608264	2003 SN_{367}	—	September 26, 2003	Apache Point	SDSS	·	680 m	MPC · JPL
608265	2003 SS_{367}	—	September 26, 2003	Apache Point	SDSS Collaboration	VER	2.0 km	MPC · JPL
608266	2003 SB_{368}	—	September 16, 2003	Kitt Peak	Spacewatch	·	1.3 km	MPC · JPL
608267	2003 SS_{368}	—	September 26, 2003	Apache Point	SDSS Collaboration	·	2.2 km	MPC · JPL
608268	2003 SX_{368}	—	September 27, 2003	Kitt Peak	Spacewatch	ADE	1.3 km	MPC · JPL
608269	2003 SB_{369}	—	September 27, 2003	Kitt Peak	Spacewatch	·	2.6 km	MPC · JPL
608270	2003 SR_{369}	—	September 17, 2003	Kitt Peak	Spacewatch	·	1.3 km	MPC · JPL
608271	2003 SS_{369}	—	September 17, 2003	Kitt Peak	Spacewatch	·	1.5 km	MPC · JPL
608272	2003 SP_{371}	—	September 26, 2003	Apache Point	SDSS Collaboration	VER	1.9 km	MPC · JPL
608273	2003 SD_{372}	—	September 29, 2003	Kitt Peak	Spacewatch	·	2.5 km	MPC · JPL
608274	2003 SH_{375}	—	September 28, 2003	Kitt Peak	Spacewatch	·	1.0 km	MPC · JPL
608275	2003 SG_{379}	—	September 29, 2003	Kitt Peak	Spacewatch	·	2.1 km	MPC · JPL
608276	2003 SA_{381}	—	September 26, 2003	Apache Point	SDSS Collaboration	·	2.5 km	MPC · JPL
608277	2003 SH_{382}	—	September 26, 2003	Apache Point	SDSS	·	1.4 km	MPC · JPL
608278	2003 SO_{382}	—	March 8, 2005	Mount Lemmon	Mount Lemmon Survey	·	620 m	MPC · JPL
608279	2003 SJ_{385}	—	September 26, 2003	Apache Point	SDSS Collaboration	·	2.5 km	MPC · JPL
608280	2003 SC_{387}	—	October 2, 2003	Kitt Peak	Spacewatch	·	1.3 km	MPC · JPL
608281	2003 SM_{387}	—	September 26, 2003	Apache Point	SDSS Collaboration	·	700 m	MPC · JPL
608282	2003 SZ_{390}	—	September 26, 2003	Apache Point	SDSS	V	710 m	MPC · JPL
608283	2003 SF_{391}	—	September 26, 2003	Apache Point	SDSS Collaboration	·	780 m	MPC · JPL
608284	2003 SV_{391}	—	September 26, 2003	Apache Point	SDSS Collaboration	·	2.4 km	MPC · JPL
608285	2003 SE_{397}	—	September 26, 2003	Apache Point	SDSS Collaboration	·	790 m	MPC · JPL
608286	2003 SJ_{397}	—	September 26, 2003	Apache Point	SDSS	·	2.8 km	MPC · JPL
608287	2003 SQ_{398}	—	September 26, 2003	Apache Point	SDSS Collaboration	·	1.9 km	MPC · JPL
608288	2003 SK_{399}	—	September 26, 2003	Apache Point	SDSS Collaboration	·	3.0 km	MPC · JPL
608289	2003 SM_{399}	—	September 26, 2003	Apache Point	SDSS Collaboration	·	2.6 km	MPC · JPL
608290	2003 SW_{399}	—	September 26, 2003	Apache Point	SDSS Collaboration	VER	2.0 km	MPC · JPL
608291	2003 SB_{402}	—	September 26, 2003	Apache Point	SDSS Collaboration	EUN	1.0 km	MPC · JPL
608292	2003 SA_{407}	—	September 27, 2003	Apache Point	SDSS Collaboration	URS	2.4 km	MPC · JPL
608293	2003 SD_{407}	—	September 27, 2003	Apache Point	SDSS	·	3.5 km	MPC · JPL
608294	2003 SG_{410}	—	September 28, 2003	Kitt Peak	Spacewatch	·	1.2 km	MPC · JPL
608295	2003 SC_{411}	—	September 27, 2003	Kitt Peak	Spacewatch	VER	2.3 km	MPC · JPL
608296	2003 SO_{411}	—	September 28, 2003	Apache Point	SDSS Collaboration	·	1.3 km	MPC · JPL
608297	2003 SH_{413}	—	September 28, 2003	Apache Point	SDSS Collaboration	·	1.0 km	MPC · JPL
608298	2003 SQ_{413}	—	September 18, 2003	Kitt Peak	Spacewatch	·	1.4 km	MPC · JPL
608299	2003 SW_{413}	—	September 29, 2003	Kitt Peak	Spacewatch	·	1.2 km	MPC · JPL
608300	2003 SE_{414}	—	September 28, 2003	Apache Point	SDSS Collaboration	·	1.3 km	MPC · JPL

== 608301–608400 ==
back to top

Designation			Discovery			Properties		Ref
Permanent	Provisional	Named after	Date	Site	Discoverer(s)	Category	Diam.	Ref
608301	2003 SY_{415}	—	September 30, 2003	Kitt Peak	Spacewatch	·	1.2 km	MPC · JPL
608302	2003 SE_{418}	—	September 28, 2003	Apache Point	SDSS Collaboration	·	2.7 km	MPC · JPL
608303	2003 SM_{425}	—	December 3, 2005	Mauna Kea	A. Boattini	MIS	2.3 km	MPC · JPL
608304	2003 SN_{425}	—	April 26, 2006	Mount Lemmon	Mount Lemmon Survey	·	650 m	MPC · JPL
608305	2003 ST_{425}	—	September 17, 2003	Kitt Peak	Spacewatch	·	1.1 km	MPC · JPL
608306	2003 SK_{426}	—	March 4, 2005	Kitt Peak	Spacewatch	·	600 m	MPC · JPL
608307	2003 SK_{427}	—	August 26, 2003	Cerro Tololo	Deep Ecliptic Survey	·	1.5 km	MPC · JPL
608308	2003 SE_{436}	—	September 20, 2003	Kitt Peak	Spacewatch	·	860 m	MPC · JPL
608309	2003 SG_{436}	—	January 7, 2014	Mount Lemmon	Mount Lemmon Survey	·	1.6 km	MPC · JPL
608310	2003 SN_{436}	—	September 18, 2003	Palomar	NEAT	·	1.3 km	MPC · JPL
608311	2003 SS_{436}	—	September 29, 2003	Kitt Peak	Spacewatch	·	690 m	MPC · JPL
608312	2003 SY_{436}	—	September 22, 2003	Kitt Peak	Spacewatch	·	770 m	MPC · JPL
608313	2003 SM_{437}	—	January 8, 2011	Mount Lemmon	Mount Lemmon Survey	VER	2.3 km	MPC · JPL
608314	2003 ST_{437}	—	November 1, 2010	Mount Lemmon	Mount Lemmon Survey	·	580 m	MPC · JPL
608315	2003 SF_{438}	—	September 29, 2003	Apache Point	SDSS	·	1.2 km	MPC · JPL
608316	2003 SJ_{438}	—	September 13, 2010	La Sagra	OAM	V	490 m	MPC · JPL
608317	2003 SL_{438}	—	December 25, 2005	Mount Lemmon	Mount Lemmon Survey	·	2.5 km	MPC · JPL
608318	2003 SO_{438}	—	October 23, 2009	Mount Lemmon	Mount Lemmon Survey	·	2.6 km	MPC · JPL
608319	2003 SP_{438}	—	September 21, 2003	Kitt Peak	Spacewatch	·	540 m	MPC · JPL
608320	2003 SU_{438}	—	October 11, 2012	Kitt Peak	Spacewatch	·	1.5 km	MPC · JPL
608321	2003 SY_{438}	—	September 27, 2003	Kitt Peak	Spacewatch	·	640 m	MPC · JPL
608322	2003 SZ_{438}	—	September 28, 2003	Kitt Peak	Spacewatch	·	640 m	MPC · JPL
608323	2003 SC_{439}	—	April 22, 2007	Mount Lemmon	Mount Lemmon Survey	·	2.7 km	MPC · JPL
608324	2003 SR_{439}	—	November 19, 2008	Mount Lemmon	Mount Lemmon Survey	·	1.6 km	MPC · JPL
608325	2003 SY_{439}	—	December 4, 2008	Kitt Peak	Spacewatch	·	1.3 km	MPC · JPL
608326	2003 SL_{440}	—	March 13, 2001	Prescott	P. G. Comba	·	2.4 km	MPC · JPL
608327	2003 SX_{440}	—	March 26, 2014	Mount Lemmon	Mount Lemmon Survey	·	1.3 km	MPC · JPL
608328	2003 SZ_{440}	—	December 10, 2010	Mount Lemmon	Mount Lemmon Survey	VER	2.6 km	MPC · JPL
608329	2003 SD_{441}	—	September 19, 2003	Kitt Peak	Spacewatch	THM	2.0 km	MPC · JPL
608330	2003 SE_{441}	—	February 9, 2005	Kitt Peak	Spacewatch	EUN	980 m	MPC · JPL
608331	2003 SL_{441}	—	September 28, 2003	Kitt Peak	Spacewatch	·	1.3 km	MPC · JPL
608332	2003 SP_{441}	—	September 18, 2003	Kitt Peak	Spacewatch	·	1.4 km	MPC · JPL
608333	2003 SV_{441}	—	September 27, 2016	Mount Lemmon	Mount Lemmon Survey	·	1.4 km	MPC · JPL
608334	2003 SX_{441}	—	September 30, 2003	Kitt Peak	Spacewatch	HNS	840 m	MPC · JPL
608335	2003 SC_{442}	—	October 1, 2014	Haleakala	Pan-STARRS 1	·	2.4 km	MPC · JPL
608336	2003 SN_{442}	—	May 6, 2006	Mount Lemmon	Mount Lemmon Survey	·	660 m	MPC · JPL
608337	2003 SO_{442}	—	September 18, 2003	Kitt Peak	Spacewatch	EOS	1.8 km	MPC · JPL
608338	2003 SP_{442}	—	February 4, 2005	Mount Lemmon	Mount Lemmon Survey	·	1.0 km	MPC · JPL
608339	2003 SU_{442}	—	September 9, 2010	Kitt Peak	Spacewatch	·	610 m	MPC · JPL
608340	2003 SW_{442}	—	February 9, 2005	Kitt Peak	Spacewatch	·	1.3 km	MPC · JPL
608341	2003 SX_{442}	—	October 10, 2012	Haleakala	Pan-STARRS 1	·	1.4 km	MPC · JPL
608342	2003 SA_{443}	—	September 23, 2003	Palomar	NEAT	·	1.3 km	MPC · JPL
608343	2003 SM_{443}	—	February 7, 2011	Mount Lemmon	Mount Lemmon Survey	·	2.7 km	MPC · JPL
608344	2003 SV_{443}	—	June 27, 2011	Mount Lemmon	Mount Lemmon Survey	·	1.3 km	MPC · JPL
608345	2003 SA_{444}	—	January 13, 2011	Mount Lemmon	Mount Lemmon Survey	·	2.7 km	MPC · JPL
608346	2003 SR_{444}	—	September 20, 2003	Kitt Peak	Spacewatch	ELF	2.6 km	MPC · JPL
608347	2003 ST_{444}	—	September 30, 2003	Kitt Peak	Spacewatch	·	920 m	MPC · JPL
608348	2003 SB_{445}	—	July 25, 2015	Haleakala	Pan-STARRS 1	·	1.2 km	MPC · JPL
608349	2003 SN_{445}	—	July 30, 2014	Kitt Peak	Spacewatch	·	2.5 km	MPC · JPL
608350	2003 SU_{445}	—	October 26, 2016	Haleakala	Pan-STARRS 1	·	1.2 km	MPC · JPL
608351	2003 SL_{446}	—	September 28, 2003	Apache Point	SDSS Collaboration	(2076)	500 m	MPC · JPL
608352	2003 SM_{446}	—	February 25, 2006	Kitt Peak	Spacewatch	·	2.4 km	MPC · JPL
608353	2003 SE_{448}	—	September 18, 2003	Palomar	NEAT	·	2.5 km	MPC · JPL
608354	2003 SH_{448}	—	September 28, 2003	Kitt Peak	Spacewatch	·	2.4 km	MPC · JPL
608355	2003 SM_{450}	—	September 21, 2003	Palomar	NEAT	·	2.7 km	MPC · JPL
608356	2003 SO_{450}	—	August 10, 2011	Haleakala	Pan-STARRS 1	T_{j} (2.98) · 3:2	3.8 km	MPC · JPL
608357	2003 SP_{450}	—	November 12, 2012	Mount Lemmon	Mount Lemmon Survey	·	1.2 km	MPC · JPL
608358	2003 SD_{451}	—	April 23, 2015	Haleakala	Pan-STARRS 1	EUN	890 m	MPC · JPL
608359	2003 SF_{452}	—	September 18, 2003	Kitt Peak	Spacewatch	·	530 m	MPC · JPL
608360	2003 SK_{455}	—	July 13, 2016	Mount Lemmon	Mount Lemmon Survey	·	1.4 km	MPC · JPL
608361	2003 SN_{457}	—	March 30, 2012	Kitt Peak	Spacewatch	·	2.5 km	MPC · JPL
608362	2003 SK_{458}	—	August 20, 2014	Haleakala	Pan-STARRS 1	·	2.7 km	MPC · JPL
608363	2003 SN_{458}	—	September 19, 2003	Palomar	NEAT	·	3.8 km	MPC · JPL
608364	2003 SO_{458}	—	September 20, 2003	Kitt Peak	Spacewatch	·	3.2 km	MPC · JPL
608365	2003 SU_{458}	—	January 30, 2011	Haleakala	Pan-STARRS 1	·	2.4 km	MPC · JPL
608366	2003 SF_{459}	—	January 30, 2012	Mount Lemmon	Mount Lemmon Survey	·	2.5 km	MPC · JPL
608367	2003 SJ_{459}	—	February 20, 2014	Mount Lemmon	Mount Lemmon Survey	·	1.3 km	MPC · JPL
608368	2003 SW_{459}	—	January 10, 2018	Haleakala	Pan-STARRS 1	THB	2.5 km	MPC · JPL
608369	2003 SB_{460}	—	December 4, 2016	Mount Lemmon	Mount Lemmon Survey	MAR	930 m	MPC · JPL
608370	2003 SC_{460}	—	August 27, 2014	Haleakala	Pan-STARRS 1	·	2.2 km	MPC · JPL
608371	2003 SR_{460}	—	February 9, 2014	Mount Lemmon	Mount Lemmon Survey	·	1.2 km	MPC · JPL
608372	2003 SP_{461}	—	September 4, 2014	Haleakala	Pan-STARRS 1	·	2.2 km	MPC · JPL
608373	2003 SA_{463}	—	September 30, 2003	Kitt Peak	Spacewatch	·	1.3 km	MPC · JPL
608374	2003 SP_{463}	—	March 2, 2016	Mount Lemmon	Mount Lemmon Survey	·	680 m	MPC · JPL
608375	2003 SW_{463}	—	September 16, 2003	Kitt Peak	Spacewatch	·	580 m	MPC · JPL
608376	2003 SQ_{464}	—	September 30, 2003	Kitt Peak	Spacewatch	·	2.5 km	MPC · JPL
608377	2003 SA_{466}	—	September 18, 2003	Kitt Peak	Spacewatch	·	1.0 km	MPC · JPL
608378	2003 SB_{466}	—	September 19, 2003	Kitt Peak	Spacewatch	·	1.2 km	MPC · JPL
608379	2003 SC_{466}	—	September 29, 2003	Kitt Peak	Spacewatch	·	1.1 km	MPC · JPL
608380	2003 SE_{466}	—	September 29, 2003	Kitt Peak	Spacewatch	·	1.1 km	MPC · JPL
608381	2003 SF_{466}	—	September 28, 2003	Apache Point	SDSS Collaboration	VER	2.2 km	MPC · JPL
608382	2003 SQ_{466}	—	September 28, 2003	Kitt Peak	Spacewatch	·	1.2 km	MPC · JPL
608383	2003 SS_{467}	—	August 24, 2003	Cerro Tololo	Deep Ecliptic Survey	·	990 m	MPC · JPL
608384	2003 SV_{467}	—	September 29, 2003	Kitt Peak	Spacewatch	·	2.2 km	MPC · JPL
608385	2003 SK_{468}	—	September 18, 2003	Kitt Peak	Spacewatch	·	2.0 km	MPC · JPL
608386	2003 SO_{468}	—	September 22, 2003	Kitt Peak	Spacewatch	·	1.1 km	MPC · JPL
608387	2003 SX_{468}	—	September 19, 2003	Kitt Peak	Spacewatch	·	1.8 km	MPC · JPL
608388	2003 SN_{469}	—	September 16, 2003	Kitt Peak	Spacewatch	·	1.0 km	MPC · JPL
608389	2003 ST_{469}	—	September 26, 2003	Apache Point	SDSS Collaboration	·	2.3 km	MPC · JPL
608390	2003 SJ_{474}	—	September 18, 2003	Kitt Peak	Spacewatch	V	520 m	MPC · JPL
608391	2003 TX_{2}	—	October 1, 2003	Kitt Peak	Spacewatch	V	500 m	MPC · JPL
608392	2003 TG_{4}	—	October 2, 2003	Kitt Peak	Spacewatch	·	2.4 km	MPC · JPL
608393	2003 TR_{5}	—	October 3, 2003	Kitt Peak	Spacewatch	·	1.3 km	MPC · JPL
608394	2003 TK_{19}	—	October 15, 2003	Palomar	NEAT	·	1.1 km	MPC · JPL
608395	2003 TY_{21}	—	October 1, 2003	Kitt Peak	Spacewatch	·	2.4 km	MPC · JPL
608396	2003 TB_{22}	—	October 1, 2003	Kitt Peak	Spacewatch	·	1.3 km	MPC · JPL
608397	2003 TN_{22}	—	September 25, 2003	Palomar	NEAT	·	1.2 km	MPC · JPL
608398	2003 TU_{22}	—	October 1, 2003	Kitt Peak	Spacewatch	·	2.2 km	MPC · JPL
608399	2003 TP_{23}	—	October 1, 2003	Kitt Peak	Spacewatch	·	1.9 km	MPC · JPL
608400	2003 TK_{24}	—	October 1, 2003	Kitt Peak	Spacewatch	·	1.1 km	MPC · JPL

== 608401–608500 ==
back to top

Designation			Discovery			Properties		Ref
Permanent	Provisional	Named after	Date	Site	Discoverer(s)	Category	Diam.	Ref
608401	2003 TF_{33}	—	October 1, 2003	Kitt Peak	Spacewatch	·	1.7 km	MPC · JPL
608402	2003 TB_{34}	—	October 1, 2003	Kitt Peak	Spacewatch	·	2.7 km	MPC · JPL
608403	2003 TQ_{34}	—	October 1, 2003	Kitt Peak	Spacewatch	·	3.0 km	MPC · JPL
608404	2003 TP_{37}	—	October 2, 2003	Kitt Peak	Spacewatch	·	2.9 km	MPC · JPL
608405	2003 TB_{40}	—	October 2, 2003	Kitt Peak	Spacewatch	·	2.8 km	MPC · JPL
608406	2003 TT_{40}	—	October 2, 2003	Kitt Peak	Spacewatch	·	2.3 km	MPC · JPL
608407	2003 TW_{40}	—	October 2, 2003	Kitt Peak	Spacewatch	·	3.1 km	MPC · JPL
608408	2003 TN_{45}	—	September 21, 2003	Kitt Peak	Spacewatch	VER	2.4 km	MPC · JPL
608409	2003 TL_{46}	—	October 3, 2003	Kitt Peak	Spacewatch	·	3.3 km	MPC · JPL
608410	2003 TP_{47}	—	September 19, 2003	Kitt Peak	Spacewatch	·	2.5 km	MPC · JPL
608411	2003 TQ_{47}	—	September 17, 2003	Palomar	NEAT	EOS	1.9 km	MPC · JPL
608412	2003 TP_{50}	—	October 4, 2003	Kitt Peak	Spacewatch	·	2.4 km	MPC · JPL
608413	2003 TY_{50}	—	October 4, 2003	Kitt Peak	Spacewatch	·	1.8 km	MPC · JPL
608414	2003 TX_{59}	—	November 1, 2007	Kitt Peak	Spacewatch	·	950 m	MPC · JPL
608415	2003 TB_{60}	—	September 15, 2010	Catalina	CSS	·	790 m	MPC · JPL
608416	2003 TZ_{60}	—	October 3, 2003	Kitt Peak	Spacewatch	V	540 m	MPC · JPL
608417	2003 TD_{61}	—	July 25, 2011	Haleakala	Pan-STARRS 1	·	1.8 km	MPC · JPL
608418	2003 TE_{61}	—	October 23, 2009	Mount Lemmon	Mount Lemmon Survey	·	2.7 km	MPC · JPL
608419	2003 TH_{61}	—	October 1, 2003	Kitt Peak	Spacewatch	·	1.2 km	MPC · JPL
608420	2003 TU_{61}	—	October 1, 2003	Kitt Peak	Spacewatch	·	2.0 km	MPC · JPL
608421	2003 TA_{62}	—	July 11, 2016	Haleakala	Pan-STARRS 1	·	1.4 km	MPC · JPL
608422	2003 TJ_{62}	—	October 1, 2003	Kitt Peak	Spacewatch	·	940 m	MPC · JPL
608423	2003 TP_{62}	—	October 4, 2003	Kitt Peak	Spacewatch	·	810 m	MPC · JPL
608424	2003 TS_{62}	—	September 24, 2008	Mount Lemmon	Mount Lemmon Survey	·	1.8 km	MPC · JPL
608425	2003 TH_{63}	—	January 29, 2011	Mount Lemmon	Mount Lemmon Survey	·	2.3 km	MPC · JPL
608426	2003 TX_{63}	—	August 28, 2014	Haleakala	Pan-STARRS 1	·	2.6 km	MPC · JPL
608427	2003 TX_{64}	—	October 2, 2003	Kitt Peak	Spacewatch	·	1.4 km	MPC · JPL
608428	2003 TE_{65}	—	October 1, 2003	Kitt Peak	Spacewatch	·	2.3 km	MPC · JPL
608429	2003 UR	—	October 16, 2003	Socorro	LINEAR	PHO	880 m	MPC · JPL
608430	2003 UK_{1}	—	September 21, 2003	Palomar	NEAT	V	480 m	MPC · JPL
608431	2003 UG_{17}	—	October 17, 2003	Kitt Peak	Spacewatch	·	790 m	MPC · JPL
608432	2003 UY_{20}	—	October 13, 2003	Palomar	NEAT	H	580 m	MPC · JPL
608433	2003 US_{35}	—	October 16, 2003	Palomar	NEAT	·	1.8 km	MPC · JPL
608434	2003 UL_{43}	—	October 17, 2003	Kitt Peak	Spacewatch	·	1.6 km	MPC · JPL
608435	2003 UC_{46}	—	October 18, 2003	Kitt Peak	Spacewatch	·	1.5 km	MPC · JPL
608436	2003 UM_{49}	—	October 16, 2003	Palomar	NEAT	ADE	2.0 km	MPC · JPL
608437	2003 UV_{55}	—	October 1, 2003	Kitt Peak	Spacewatch	·	1.3 km	MPC · JPL
608438	2003 UM_{61}	—	September 22, 2003	Palomar	NEAT	(1547)	1.4 km	MPC · JPL
608439	2003 UC_{67}	—	September 27, 2003	Kitt Peak	Spacewatch	·	2.6 km	MPC · JPL
608440	2003 UC_{71}	—	October 18, 2003	Kitt Peak	Spacewatch	·	930 m	MPC · JPL
608441	2003 UF_{74}	—	September 22, 2003	Kitt Peak	Spacewatch	JUN	830 m	MPC · JPL
608442	2003 UO_{84}	—	October 18, 2003	Kitt Peak	Spacewatch	NEM	1.8 km	MPC · JPL
608443	2003 UZ_{87}	—	September 28, 2003	Kitt Peak	Spacewatch	·	2.8 km	MPC · JPL
608444	2003 UG_{88}	—	September 28, 2003	Kitt Peak	Spacewatch	URS	2.7 km	MPC · JPL
608445	2003 UG_{90}	—	September 23, 2003	Palomar	NEAT	·	1.5 km	MPC · JPL
608446	2003 UU_{91}	—	October 20, 2003	Kitt Peak	Spacewatch	THM	2.4 km	MPC · JPL
608447	2003 UL_{96}	—	September 22, 2003	Palomar	NEAT	TIR	3.1 km	MPC · JPL
608448	2003 UX_{103}	—	October 17, 2003	Kitt Peak	Spacewatch	·	660 m	MPC · JPL
608449	2003 US_{114}	—	October 20, 2003	Kitt Peak	Spacewatch	·	1.7 km	MPC · JPL
608450	2003 UC_{115}	—	October 20, 2003	Kitt Peak	Spacewatch	·	1.2 km	MPC · JPL
608451	2003 UG_{130}	—	October 18, 2003	Palomar	NEAT	·	2.2 km	MPC · JPL
608452	2003 UD_{134}	—	September 19, 2003	Palomar	NEAT	·	2.0 km	MPC · JPL
608453	2003 UO_{153}	—	September 18, 2003	Kitt Peak	Spacewatch	·	1.4 km	MPC · JPL
608454	2003 UW_{154}	—	October 20, 2003	Kitt Peak	Spacewatch	·	650 m	MPC · JPL
608455	2003 UY_{154}	—	October 20, 2003	Kitt Peak	Spacewatch	·	1.2 km	MPC · JPL
608456	2003 UB_{156}	—	October 20, 2003	Kitt Peak	Spacewatch	·	640 m	MPC · JPL
608457	2003 US_{170}	—	October 19, 2003	Palomar	NEAT	HNS	1.9 km	MPC · JPL
608458	2003 UD_{172}	—	September 30, 2003	Kitt Peak	Spacewatch	NYS	590 m	MPC · JPL
608459	2003 UQ_{176}	—	October 21, 2003	Anderson Mesa	LONEOS	·	1.6 km	MPC · JPL
608460	2003 UD_{178}	—	September 20, 2003	Palomar	NEAT	·	740 m	MPC · JPL
608461	2003 UB_{179}	—	September 22, 2003	Kitt Peak	Spacewatch	·	750 m	MPC · JPL
608462	2003 UP_{197}	—	September 25, 2003	Haleakala	NEAT	·	2.7 km	MPC · JPL
608463	2003 UY_{204}	—	September 22, 2003	Kitt Peak	Spacewatch	·	1.4 km	MPC · JPL
608464	2003 UR_{207}	—	September 26, 2003	Desert Eagle	W. K. Y. Yeung	·	1.2 km	MPC · JPL
608465	2003 UZ_{226}	—	October 23, 2003	Kitt Peak	Spacewatch	·	740 m	MPC · JPL
608466	2003 UH_{233}	—	September 28, 2003	Kitt Peak	Spacewatch	·	1.4 km	MPC · JPL
608467	2003 UR_{234}	—	October 19, 2003	Kitt Peak	Spacewatch	·	1.5 km	MPC · JPL
608468	2003 US_{234}	—	October 24, 2003	Kitt Peak	Spacewatch	EOS	2.2 km	MPC · JPL
608469	2003 UE_{236}	—	September 19, 2003	Kitt Peak	Spacewatch	·	2.2 km	MPC · JPL
608470	2003 UV_{237}	—	October 23, 2003	Kitt Peak	Spacewatch	·	3.1 km	MPC · JPL
608471	2003 UU_{275}	—	October 24, 2003	Socorro	LINEAR	HNS	1.5 km	MPC · JPL
608472	2003 UD_{281}	—	September 8, 2003	Kvistaberg	Uppsala-DLR Asteroid Survey	·	1.1 km	MPC · JPL
608473	2003 UF_{287}	—	October 23, 2003	Kitt Peak	Spacewatch	·	2.4 km	MPC · JPL
608474	2003 UE_{290}	—	October 22, 2003	Kitt Peak	Deep Ecliptic Survey	THB	2.0 km	MPC · JPL
608475	2003 UT_{290}	—	October 23, 2003	Kitt Peak	Spacewatch	·	3.0 km	MPC · JPL
608476	2003 UZ_{293}	—	October 21, 2003	Anderson Mesa	LONEOS	TIR	3.3 km	MPC · JPL
608477	2003 UL_{300}	—	October 16, 2003	Kitt Peak	Spacewatch	·	2.3 km	MPC · JPL
608478	2003 UN_{301}	—	October 17, 2003	Kitt Peak	Spacewatch	·	2.5 km	MPC · JPL
608479	2003 UO_{305}	—	October 18, 2003	Kitt Peak	Spacewatch	VER	2.6 km	MPC · JPL
608480	2003 UD_{306}	—	October 18, 2003	Kitt Peak	Spacewatch	·	540 m	MPC · JPL
608481	2003 UJ_{306}	—	October 1, 2003	Kitt Peak	Spacewatch	·	1.4 km	MPC · JPL
608482	2003 UK_{306}	—	October 18, 2003	Kitt Peak	Spacewatch	·	2.9 km	MPC · JPL
608483	2003 UB_{307}	—	October 18, 2003	Kitt Peak	Spacewatch	·	2.3 km	MPC · JPL
608484	2003 UP_{307}	—	October 18, 2003	Anderson Mesa	LONEOS	·	3.2 km	MPC · JPL
608485	2003 UO_{313}	—	January 28, 2000	Kitt Peak	Spacewatch	·	1.2 km	MPC · JPL
608486	2003 UC_{314}	—	October 2, 2003	Kitt Peak	Spacewatch	EUN	1.3 km	MPC · JPL
608487	2003 UK_{315}	—	October 2, 2003	Kitt Peak	Spacewatch	·	1.2 km	MPC · JPL
608488	2003 UX_{316}	—	September 23, 2003	Palomar	NEAT	·	1.4 km	MPC · JPL
608489	2003 UR_{318}	—	September 20, 2003	Palomar	NEAT	JUN	760 m	MPC · JPL
608490	2003 US_{318}	—	October 19, 2003	Socorro	LINEAR	·	3.4 km	MPC · JPL
608491	2003 UO_{320}	—	September 28, 2003	Anderson Mesa	LONEOS	·	610 m	MPC · JPL
608492	2003 UX_{324}	—	August 27, 2003	Palomar	NEAT	·	1.5 km	MPC · JPL
608493	2003 UB_{325}	—	August 20, 2003	Palomar	NEAT	·	2.9 km	MPC · JPL
608494	2003 UA_{326}	—	September 27, 2003	Kitt Peak	Spacewatch	3:2	6.6 km	MPC · JPL
608495	2003 UQ_{326}	—	October 17, 2003	Apache Point	SDSS Collaboration	·	2.3 km	MPC · JPL
608496	2003 UG_{327}	—	August 28, 2003	Palomar	NEAT	·	2.9 km	MPC · JPL
608497	2003 UU_{327}	—	October 17, 2003	Apache Point	SDSS Collaboration	3:2	4.4 km	MPC · JPL
608498	2003 US_{328}	—	September 20, 2003	Kitt Peak	Spacewatch	VER	2.5 km	MPC · JPL
608499	2003 UK_{329}	—	October 17, 2003	Apache Point	SDSS Collaboration	·	3.0 km	MPC · JPL
608500	2003 UP_{329}	—	August 26, 2003	Cerro Tololo	Deep Ecliptic Survey	HNS	790 m	MPC · JPL

== 608501–608600 ==
back to top

Designation			Discovery			Properties		Ref
Permanent	Provisional	Named after	Date	Site	Discoverer(s)	Category	Diam.	Ref
608501	2003 UJ_{331}	—	August 20, 2003	Palomar	NEAT	ADE	2.0 km	MPC · JPL
608502	2003 UL_{331}	—	October 18, 2003	Apache Point	SDSS Collaboration	·	1.3 km	MPC · JPL
608503	2003 UR_{331}	—	September 17, 2003	Kitt Peak	Spacewatch	·	1.4 km	MPC · JPL
608504	2003 UR_{334}	—	October 18, 2003	Apache Point	SDSS Collaboration	·	1.7 km	MPC · JPL
608505	2003 UM_{335}	—	September 18, 2003	Kitt Peak	Spacewatch	·	1.4 km	MPC · JPL
608506	2003 UT_{337}	—	October 18, 2003	Kitt Peak	Spacewatch	·	1.3 km	MPC · JPL
608507	2003 UQ_{338}	—	October 20, 2003	Kitt Peak	Spacewatch	·	570 m	MPC · JPL
608508	2003 UF_{341}	—	October 19, 2003	Apache Point	SDSS	·	2.9 km	MPC · JPL
608509	2003 UL_{341}	—	October 19, 2003	Apache Point	SDSS	·	2.9 km	MPC · JPL
608510	2003 UP_{350}	—	January 16, 2005	Kitt Peak	Spacewatch	MIS	2.5 km	MPC · JPL
608511	2003 UU_{352}	—	October 19, 2003	Apache Point	SDSS Collaboration	·	1.1 km	MPC · JPL
608512	2003 UO_{353}	—	October 19, 2003	Apache Point	SDSS	·	3.0 km	MPC · JPL
608513	2003 UV_{353}	—	October 19, 2003	Apache Point	SDSS	·	1.3 km	MPC · JPL
608514	2003 US_{360}	—	September 27, 2003	Kitt Peak	Spacewatch	EOS	1.9 km	MPC · JPL
608515	2003 UT_{360}	—	September 21, 2003	Kitt Peak	Spacewatch	·	1.4 km	MPC · JPL
608516	2003 UH_{365}	—	October 20, 2003	Kitt Peak	Spacewatch	·	2.4 km	MPC · JPL
608517	2003 UY_{365}	—	October 20, 2003	Kitt Peak	Spacewatch	·	1.6 km	MPC · JPL
608518	2003 UT_{366}	—	October 20, 2003	Kitt Peak	Spacewatch	MAR	1.1 km	MPC · JPL
608519	2003 UB_{367}	—	October 21, 2003	Kitt Peak	Spacewatch	·	2.5 km	MPC · JPL
608520	2003 UX_{367}	—	October 21, 2003	Kitt Peak	Spacewatch	·	1.2 km	MPC · JPL
608521	2003 UZ_{369}	—	October 21, 2003	Kitt Peak	Spacewatch	NYS	770 m	MPC · JPL
608522	2003 UD_{371}	—	October 22, 2003	Apache Point	SDSS	·	2.9 km	MPC · JPL
608523	2003 UE_{371}	—	October 22, 2003	Apache Point	SDSS	EUN	920 m	MPC · JPL
608524	2003 UM_{372}	—	August 23, 2003	Palomar	NEAT	·	2.3 km	MPC · JPL
608525	2003 UO_{372}	—	September 21, 2003	Kitt Peak	Spacewatch	·	980 m	MPC · JPL
608526	2003 UH_{373}	—	September 28, 2003	Kitt Peak	Spacewatch	·	2.1 km	MPC · JPL
608527	2003 UC_{374}	—	October 22, 2003	Apache Point	SDSS Collaboration	VER	2.4 km	MPC · JPL
608528	2003 UR_{374}	—	September 20, 2003	Kitt Peak	Spacewatch	·	2.2 km	MPC · JPL
608529	2003 UZ_{374}	—	October 22, 2003	Apache Point	SDSS	·	650 m	MPC · JPL
608530	2003 UO_{375}	—	October 20, 2003	Kitt Peak	Spacewatch	URS	3.6 km	MPC · JPL
608531	2003 UU_{375}	—	September 19, 2003	Kitt Peak	Spacewatch	EOS	2.0 km	MPC · JPL
608532	2003 UP_{376}	—	September 29, 2003	Kitt Peak	Spacewatch	·	1.5 km	MPC · JPL
608533	2003 UA_{378}	—	September 18, 2003	Kitt Peak	Spacewatch	·	1.2 km	MPC · JPL
608534	2003 UN_{381}	—	October 22, 2003	Apache Point	SDSS	·	2.4 km	MPC · JPL
608535	2003 UR_{381}	—	October 22, 2003	Apache Point	SDSS Collaboration	·	2.8 km	MPC · JPL
608536	2003 UU_{382}	—	September 18, 2003	Kitt Peak	Spacewatch	T_{j} (2.94)	2.7 km	MPC · JPL
608537	2003 UP_{386}	—	October 22, 2003	Apache Point	SDSS Collaboration	V	550 m	MPC · JPL
608538	2003 UG_{387}	—	October 22, 2003	Apache Point	SDSS Collaboration	·	2.0 km	MPC · JPL
608539	2003 UX_{388}	—	October 22, 2003	Apache Point	SDSS Collaboration	·	2.5 km	MPC · JPL
608540	2003 UW_{389}	—	October 22, 2003	Apache Point	SDSS	·	2.6 km	MPC · JPL
608541	2003 UH_{390}	—	October 22, 2003	Apache Point	SDSS Collaboration	·	2.2 km	MPC · JPL
608542	2003 UJ_{390}	—	September 27, 2003	Apache Point	SDSS Collaboration	EUN	1.3 km	MPC · JPL
608543	2003 UA_{391}	—	October 22, 2003	Apache Point	SDSS	·	610 m	MPC · JPL
608544	2003 UX_{392}	—	October 22, 2003	Apache Point	SDSS Collaboration	RAF	960 m	MPC · JPL
608545	2003 UY_{393}	—	October 22, 2003	Apache Point	SDSS Collaboration	·	2.6 km	MPC · JPL
608546	2003 UU_{394}	—	October 22, 2003	Apache Point	SDSS Collaboration	·	2.6 km	MPC · JPL
608547	2003 UM_{395}	—	October 22, 2003	Apache Point	SDSS Collaboration	·	2.3 km	MPC · JPL
608548	2003 UT_{395}	—	December 19, 2004	Mount Lemmon	Mount Lemmon Survey	·	3.8 km	MPC · JPL
608549	2003 UX_{395}	—	October 22, 2003	Apache Point	SDSS Collaboration	·	1.3 km	MPC · JPL
608550	2003 UG_{396}	—	October 22, 2003	Apache Point	SDSS Collaboration	·	2.5 km	MPC · JPL
608551	2003 UX_{396}	—	December 19, 2004	Mount Lemmon	Mount Lemmon Survey	EOS	2.6 km	MPC · JPL
608552	2003 UO_{397}	—	October 22, 2003	Apache Point	SDSS Collaboration	EUN	1.1 km	MPC · JPL
608553	2003 UR_{397}	—	October 22, 2003	Apache Point	SDSS Collaboration	·	2.5 km	MPC · JPL
608554	2003 UW_{398}	—	October 22, 2003	Apache Point	SDSS Collaboration	·	2.6 km	MPC · JPL
608555	2003 UL_{399}	—	October 22, 2003	Apache Point	SDSS Collaboration	·	1.3 km	MPC · JPL
608556	2003 UE_{400}	—	October 16, 2003	Kitt Peak	Spacewatch	THM	2.7 km	MPC · JPL
608557	2003 UZ_{400}	—	September 30, 2003	Kitt Peak	Spacewatch	·	1.5 km	MPC · JPL
608558	2003 UD_{402}	—	October 23, 2003	Apache Point	SDSS	·	1.5 km	MPC · JPL
608559	2003 UU_{403}	—	September 28, 2003	Kitt Peak	Spacewatch	HNS	1.3 km	MPC · JPL
608560	2003 UQ_{404}	—	September 28, 2003	Anderson Mesa	LONEOS	·	1.6 km	MPC · JPL
608561	2003 UR_{404}	—	October 23, 2003	Apache Point	SDSS Collaboration	·	1.1 km	MPC · JPL
608562	2003 UH_{405}	—	October 23, 2003	Apache Point	SDSS	·	2.7 km	MPC · JPL
608563	2003 UA_{407}	—	October 23, 2003	Kitt Peak	Spacewatch	·	1.8 km	MPC · JPL
608564	2003 UL_{408}	—	February 2, 2005	Kitt Peak	Spacewatch	·	1.6 km	MPC · JPL
608565	2003 UO_{409}	—	October 23, 2003	Apache Point	SDSS Collaboration	·	2.4 km	MPC · JPL
608566	2003 US_{409}	—	October 23, 2003	Apache Point	SDSS Collaboration	URS	2.0 km	MPC · JPL
608567	2003 UB_{411}	—	October 23, 2003	Apache Point	SDSS Collaboration	·	2.2 km	MPC · JPL
608568	2003 UD_{412}	—	October 23, 2003	Apache Point	SDSS	JUN	970 m	MPC · JPL
608569	2003 UF_{417}	—	September 18, 2003	Kitt Peak	Spacewatch	·	2.5 km	MPC · JPL
608570	2003 UB_{419}	—	August 28, 2003	Palomar	NEAT	·	3.6 km	MPC · JPL
608571	2003 UN_{419}	—	November 16, 2003	Kitt Peak	Spacewatch	·	780 m	MPC · JPL
608572	2003 UO_{419}	—	October 20, 2003	Kitt Peak	Spacewatch	·	740 m	MPC · JPL
608573	2003 UP_{419}	—	October 29, 2003	Kitt Peak	Spacewatch	·	800 m	MPC · JPL
608574	2003 UQ_{419}	—	October 23, 2003	Kitt Peak	Spacewatch	·	1.5 km	MPC · JPL
608575	2003 UW_{419}	—	October 11, 2010	Mount Lemmon	Mount Lemmon Survey	·	820 m	MPC · JPL
608576	2003 UC_{420}	—	December 15, 2007	Mount Lemmon	Mount Lemmon Survey	·	860 m	MPC · JPL
608577	2003 UF_{420}	—	October 23, 2003	Kitt Peak	Deep Ecliptic Survey	·	900 m	MPC · JPL
608578	2003 UV_{420}	—	April 29, 2009	Kitt Peak	Spacewatch	MAS	590 m	MPC · JPL
608579	2003 UA_{421}	—	May 30, 2008	Mount Lemmon	Mount Lemmon Survey	TIR	3.3 km	MPC · JPL
608580	2003 UG_{422}	—	December 11, 2012	Mount Lemmon	Mount Lemmon Survey	·	1.3 km	MPC · JPL
608581	2003 UH_{422}	—	January 5, 2006	Mount Lemmon	Mount Lemmon Survey	·	3.2 km	MPC · JPL
608582	2003 UQ_{422}	—	March 26, 2011	Mount Lemmon	Mount Lemmon Survey	·	2.8 km	MPC · JPL
608583	2003 UT_{422}	—	April 27, 2012	Haleakala	Pan-STARRS 1	·	2.7 km	MPC · JPL
608584	2003 UW_{422}	—	September 28, 1997	Kitt Peak	Spacewatch	·	2.9 km	MPC · JPL
608585	2003 UZ_{422}	—	October 19, 2012	Haleakala	Pan-STARRS 1	·	1.3 km	MPC · JPL
608586	2003 UD_{423}	—	April 1, 2012	Mount Lemmon	Mount Lemmon Survey	·	770 m	MPC · JPL
608587	2003 UF_{423}	—	October 23, 2003	Kitt Peak	Spacewatch	·	570 m	MPC · JPL
608588	2003 UG_{423}	—	May 21, 2015	Haleakala	Pan-STARRS 1	(17392)	1.2 km	MPC · JPL
608589	2003 UL_{423}	—	April 2, 2009	Mount Lemmon	Mount Lemmon Survey	·	760 m	MPC · JPL
608590	2003 UN_{423}	—	August 10, 2007	Kitt Peak	Spacewatch	·	1.2 km	MPC · JPL
608591	2003 UR_{424}	—	February 5, 2011	Catalina	CSS	·	2.8 km	MPC · JPL
608592	2003 UV_{424}	—	December 13, 2010	Mount Lemmon	Mount Lemmon Survey	·	3.2 km	MPC · JPL
608593	2003 UC_{425}	—	November 19, 2009	Kitt Peak	Spacewatch	·	3.3 km	MPC · JPL
608594	2003 UF_{425}	—	December 10, 2014	Mount Lemmon	Mount Lemmon Survey	·	860 m	MPC · JPL
608595	2003 UH_{425}	—	October 22, 2003	Junk Bond	D. Healy	EUN	1.0 km	MPC · JPL
608596	2003 UT_{425}	—	October 29, 2003	Kitt Peak	Spacewatch	·	1.5 km	MPC · JPL
608597	2003 UY_{425}	—	March 3, 2006	Catalina	CSS	·	2.8 km	MPC · JPL
608598	2003 UV_{426}	—	February 27, 2012	Haleakala	Pan-STARRS 1	·	640 m	MPC · JPL
608599	2003 UB_{427}	—	August 30, 2014	Haleakala	Pan-STARRS 1	·	2.6 km	MPC · JPL
608600	2003 UH_{427}	—	October 17, 2003	Kitt Peak	Spacewatch	·	720 m	MPC · JPL

== 608601–608700 ==
back to top

Designation			Discovery			Properties		Ref
Permanent	Provisional	Named after	Date	Site	Discoverer(s)	Category	Diam.	Ref
608601	2003 US_{427}	—	October 25, 2003	Kitt Peak	Spacewatch	HNS	1.2 km	MPC · JPL
608602	2003 UV_{427}	—	June 7, 2013	Haleakala	Pan-STARRS 1	·	890 m	MPC · JPL
608603	2003 UD_{428}	—	October 20, 2003	Kitt Peak	Spacewatch	·	1.4 km	MPC · JPL
608604	2003 UH_{428}	—	October 20, 2003	Kitt Peak	Spacewatch	·	1.7 km	MPC · JPL
608605	2003 UJ_{428}	—	October 23, 2003	Kitt Peak	Spacewatch	NYS	590 m	MPC · JPL
608606	2003 UU_{428}	—	November 8, 2009	Kitt Peak	Spacewatch	·	2.8 km	MPC · JPL
608607	2003 UX_{428}	—	November 16, 2009	Mount Lemmon	Mount Lemmon Survey	·	2.4 km	MPC · JPL
608608	2003 UD_{429}	—	November 6, 2012	Mount Lemmon	Mount Lemmon Survey	·	1.5 km	MPC · JPL
608609	2003 UP_{429}	—	November 16, 2003	Kitt Peak	Spacewatch	ADE	1.4 km	MPC · JPL
608610	2003 UU_{429}	—	June 1, 2014	Haleakala	Pan-STARRS 1	TIR	2.6 km	MPC · JPL
608611	2003 UL_{431}	—	October 20, 2003	Kitt Peak	Spacewatch	·	760 m	MPC · JPL
608612	2003 UY_{432}	—	October 4, 2003	Kitt Peak	Spacewatch	EOS	1.9 km	MPC · JPL
608613	2003 UD_{433}	—	November 20, 2016	Mount Lemmon	Mount Lemmon Survey	EUN	1.2 km	MPC · JPL
608614	2003 UK_{433}	—	November 6, 2015	Haleakala	Pan-STARRS 1	TIR	2.2 km	MPC · JPL
608615	2003 UZ_{433}	—	March 24, 2006	Mount Lemmon	Mount Lemmon Survey	·	2.6 km	MPC · JPL
608616	2003 UB_{434}	—	November 26, 2017	Mount Lemmon	Mount Lemmon Survey	·	600 m	MPC · JPL
608617	2003 UK_{434}	—	October 12, 2010	Mount Lemmon	Mount Lemmon Survey	V	440 m	MPC · JPL
608618	2003 UL_{434}	—	January 29, 2012	Kitt Peak	Spacewatch	·	740 m	MPC · JPL
608619	2003 UQ_{434}	—	January 23, 2006	Mount Lemmon	Mount Lemmon Survey	·	1.9 km	MPC · JPL
608620	2003 UA_{436}	—	May 10, 2011	Mount Lemmon	Mount Lemmon Survey	·	1.4 km	MPC · JPL
608621	2003 UP_{439}	—	October 19, 2003	Kitt Peak	Spacewatch	·	1.3 km	MPC · JPL
608622	2003 UU_{439}	—	September 27, 2016	Haleakala	Pan-STARRS 1	·	1.1 km	MPC · JPL
608623	2003 UY_{439}	—	March 16, 2012	Haleakala	Pan-STARRS 1	·	580 m	MPC · JPL
608624	2003 UK_{440}	—	January 12, 2011	Kitt Peak	Spacewatch	·	2.0 km	MPC · JPL
608625	2003 UC_{441}	—	January 13, 2015	Haleakala	Pan-STARRS 1	·	690 m	MPC · JPL
608626	2003 UK_{441}	—	October 1, 2014	Haleakala	Pan-STARRS 1	·	2.5 km	MPC · JPL
608627	2003 UF_{442}	—	September 3, 2008	Kitt Peak	Spacewatch	VER	2.2 km	MPC · JPL
608628	2003 UA_{443}	—	October 1, 2014	Haleakala	Pan-STARRS 1	·	2.3 km	MPC · JPL
608629	2003 US_{443}	—	September 12, 2016	Haleakala	Pan-STARRS 1	·	1.1 km	MPC · JPL
608630	2003 UL_{448}	—	October 22, 2003	Kitt Peak	Spacewatch	·	1.3 km	MPC · JPL
608631	2003 VT_{12}	—	October 11, 2010	Catalina	CSS	·	880 m	MPC · JPL
608632	2003 VH_{13}	—	January 1, 2009	Kitt Peak	Spacewatch	·	1.2 km	MPC · JPL
608633	2003 WF_{10}	—	October 25, 2003	Socorro	LINEAR	·	1.5 km	MPC · JPL
608634	2003 WL_{14}	—	November 16, 2003	Kitt Peak	Spacewatch	·	1.2 km	MPC · JPL
608635	2003 WE_{18}	—	November 19, 2003	Socorro	LINEAR	·	1.5 km	MPC · JPL
608636	2003 WD_{28}	—	November 14, 2003	Palomar	NEAT	·	2.5 km	MPC · JPL
608637	2003 WG_{42}	—	November 21, 2003	Nogales	P. R. Holvorcem, M. Schwartz	GAL	1.2 km	MPC · JPL
608638	2003 WQ_{47}	—	November 18, 2003	Kitt Peak	Spacewatch	·	860 m	MPC · JPL
608639	2003 WK_{49}	—	October 19, 2003	Palomar	NEAT	HNS	1.6 km	MPC · JPL
608640	2003 WV_{55}	—	November 20, 2003	Socorro	LINEAR	·	1.6 km	MPC · JPL
608641	2003 WY_{70}	—	October 19, 2003	Palomar	NEAT	JUN	900 m	MPC · JPL
608642	2003 WL_{76}	—	October 25, 2003	Kitt Peak	Spacewatch	·	1.3 km	MPC · JPL
608643	2003 WQ_{89}	—	December 6, 1996	Kitt Peak	Spacewatch	·	730 m	MPC · JPL
608644	2003 WA_{97}	—	October 20, 2003	Kitt Peak	Spacewatch	·	1.4 km	MPC · JPL
608645	2003 WG_{111}	—	November 20, 2003	Kitt Peak	Spacewatch	EUN	1.5 km	MPC · JPL
608646	2003 WH_{122}	—	November 20, 2003	Kitt Peak	Spacewatch	HYG	2.8 km	MPC · JPL
608647	2003 WE_{133}	—	November 21, 2003	Socorro	LINEAR	·	1.1 km	MPC · JPL
608648	2003 WL_{143}	—	September 29, 2003	Anderson Mesa	LONEOS	·	850 m	MPC · JPL
608649	2003 WC_{162}	—	November 30, 2003	Kitt Peak	Spacewatch	·	1.2 km	MPC · JPL
608650	2003 WN_{162}	—	November 30, 2003	Kitt Peak	Spacewatch	·	1.7 km	MPC · JPL
608651	2003 WZ_{164}	—	November 30, 2003	Kitt Peak	Spacewatch	·	2.5 km	MPC · JPL
608652	2003 WK_{173}	—	October 25, 2003	Kitt Peak	Spacewatch	NYS	560 m	MPC · JPL
608653	2003 WB_{177}	—	November 20, 2003	Kitt Peak	Deep Ecliptic Survey	EOS	1.4 km	MPC · JPL
608654	2003 WP_{187}	—	November 23, 2003	Kitt Peak	Deep Ecliptic Survey	·	1.1 km	MPC · JPL
608655	2003 WV_{187}	—	November 23, 2003	Kitt Peak	Deep Ecliptic Survey	·	2.6 km	MPC · JPL
608656	2003 WY_{195}	—	November 20, 2003	Apache Point	SDSS	·	920 m	MPC · JPL
608657	2003 WA_{196}	—	January 14, 2008	Kitt Peak	Spacewatch	·	1.0 km	MPC · JPL
608658	2003 WH_{196}	—	January 18, 2008	Mount Lemmon	Mount Lemmon Survey	V	620 m	MPC · JPL
608659	2003 WJ_{196}	—	October 28, 2010	Kitt Peak	Spacewatch	·	880 m	MPC · JPL
608660	2003 WP_{196}	—	November 30, 2003	Kitt Peak	Spacewatch	PHO	1 km	MPC · JPL
608661	2003 WQ_{196}	—	April 1, 2005	Kitt Peak	Spacewatch	·	1.1 km	MPC · JPL
608662	2003 WV_{196}	—	December 4, 2008	Mount Lemmon	Mount Lemmon Survey	·	1.5 km	MPC · JPL
608663	2003 WY_{196}	—	March 18, 2010	Kitt Peak	Spacewatch	·	1.6 km	MPC · JPL
608664	2003 WA_{197}	—	November 9, 2009	Kitt Peak	Spacewatch	·	3.5 km	MPC · JPL
608665	2003 WK_{197}	—	January 21, 2012	Kitt Peak	Spacewatch	·	1.1 km	MPC · JPL
608666	2003 WL_{197}	—	July 17, 2016	Haleakala	Pan-STARRS 1	·	1.7 km	MPC · JPL
608667	2003 WM_{197}	—	June 8, 2013	Mount Lemmon	Mount Lemmon Survey	·	730 m	MPC · JPL
608668	2003 WT_{197}	—	March 4, 2008	Mount Lemmon	Mount Lemmon Survey	·	720 m	MPC · JPL
608669	2003 WZ_{197}	—	December 1, 2003	Kitt Peak	Spacewatch	ERI	930 m	MPC · JPL
608670	2003 WD_{198}	—	October 22, 2012	Kitt Peak	Spacewatch	·	1.6 km	MPC · JPL
608671	2003 WK_{198}	—	August 16, 2014	Haleakala	Pan-STARRS 1	·	3.5 km	MPC · JPL
608672	2003 WM_{198}	—	February 25, 2011	Mount Lemmon	Mount Lemmon Survey	·	2.3 km	MPC · JPL
608673	2003 WV_{198}	—	December 19, 2007	Mount Lemmon	Mount Lemmon Survey	·	1.1 km	MPC · JPL
608674	2003 WZ_{198}	—	September 17, 2014	Charleston	R. Holmes	VER	2.7 km	MPC · JPL
608675	2003 WA_{199}	—	November 30, 2003	Kitt Peak	Spacewatch	HNS	1.1 km	MPC · JPL
608676	2003 WE_{199}	—	September 17, 2010	Mount Lemmon	Mount Lemmon Survey	·	590 m	MPC · JPL
608677	2003 WM_{199}	—	August 30, 2011	Haleakala	Pan-STARRS 1	·	1.4 km	MPC · JPL
608678	2003 WN_{199}	—	November 26, 2003	Kitt Peak	Spacewatch	·	700 m	MPC · JPL
608679	2003 WS_{199}	—	January 13, 2005	Kitt Peak	Spacewatch	·	3.0 km	MPC · JPL
608680	2003 WN_{200}	—	November 19, 2003	Kitt Peak	Spacewatch	·	1.3 km	MPC · JPL
608681	2003 WQ_{200}	—	March 1, 2012	Kitt Peak	Spacewatch	·	810 m	MPC · JPL
608682	2003 WZ_{200}	—	August 29, 2014	Mount Lemmon	Mount Lemmon Survey	·	2.9 km	MPC · JPL
608683	2003 WB_{201}	—	July 13, 2013	Haleakala	Pan-STARRS 1	·	2.9 km	MPC · JPL
608684	2003 WC_{201}	—	November 30, 2003	Kitt Peak	Spacewatch	·	1.5 km	MPC · JPL
608685	2003 WC_{202}	—	October 24, 2003	Kitt Peak	Spacewatch	V	460 m	MPC · JPL
608686	2003 WF_{202}	—	November 26, 2003	Kitt Peak	Spacewatch	·	1.2 km	MPC · JPL
608687	2003 WE_{204}	—	October 20, 2007	Kitt Peak	Spacewatch	GAL	1.1 km	MPC · JPL
608688	2003 WZ_{204}	—	September 25, 2016	Haleakala	Pan-STARRS 1	·	1.8 km	MPC · JPL
608689	2003 WN_{205}	—	September 25, 2006	Mount Lemmon	Mount Lemmon Survey	·	870 m	MPC · JPL
608690	2003 WY_{205}	—	March 8, 2005	Kitt Peak	Spacewatch	·	760 m	MPC · JPL
608691	2003 WG_{206}	—	January 16, 2009	Mount Lemmon	Mount Lemmon Survey	·	1.5 km	MPC · JPL
608692	2003 WP_{206}	—	November 14, 2012	Mauna Kea	M. Micheli, Draginda, A.	·	1.6 km	MPC · JPL
608693	2003 WH_{208}	—	November 18, 2003	Kitt Peak	Spacewatch	HNS	1.0 km	MPC · JPL
608694	2003 WJ_{208}	—	February 27, 2012	Haleakala	Pan-STARRS 1	·	990 m	MPC · JPL
608695	2003 WS_{208}	—	December 10, 2012	Kitt Peak	Spacewatch	·	1.2 km	MPC · JPL
608696	2003 WZ_{209}	—	March 13, 2005	Kitt Peak	Spacewatch	·	1.9 km	MPC · JPL
608697	2003 WH_{210}	—	September 28, 2008	Mount Lemmon	Mount Lemmon Survey	·	2.6 km	MPC · JPL
608698	2003 WJ_{210}	—	November 20, 2003	Kitt Peak	Spacewatch	VER	2.2 km	MPC · JPL
608699	2003 WN_{210}	—	November 30, 2003	Kitt Peak	Spacewatch	·	2.6 km	MPC · JPL
608700	2003 WO_{210}	—	September 7, 2008	Mount Lemmon	Mount Lemmon Survey	·	2.4 km	MPC · JPL

== 608701–608800 ==
back to top

Designation			Discovery			Properties		Ref
Permanent	Provisional	Named after	Date	Site	Discoverer(s)	Category	Diam.	Ref
608701	2003 WS_{210}	—	November 26, 2003	Kitt Peak	Spacewatch	·	1.4 km	MPC · JPL
608702	2003 WT_{210}	—	September 19, 2007	Kitt Peak	Spacewatch	(17392)	1.6 km	MPC · JPL
608703	2003 WF_{211}	—	February 26, 2014	Mount Lemmon	Mount Lemmon Survey	·	1.3 km	MPC · JPL
608704	2003 WH_{211}	—	November 20, 2003	Kitt Peak	Spacewatch	·	2.8 km	MPC · JPL
608705	2003 WM_{211}	—	November 19, 2003	Kitt Peak	Spacewatch	·	670 m	MPC · JPL
608706	2003 WU_{211}	—	May 3, 2016	Mount Lemmon	Mount Lemmon Survey	MAS	520 m	MPC · JPL
608707	2003 WM_{212}	—	August 28, 2016	Mount Lemmon	Mount Lemmon Survey	·	1.5 km	MPC · JPL
608708	2003 WC_{213}	—	November 16, 2003	Kitt Peak	Spacewatch	·	2.6 km	MPC · JPL
608709	2003 WK_{213}	—	November 20, 2003	Kitt Peak	Spacewatch	·	3.2 km	MPC · JPL
608710	2003 WZ_{213}	—	September 19, 2014	Haleakala	Pan-STARRS 1	·	2.2 km	MPC · JPL
608711	2003 WC_{214}	—	May 16, 2013	Haleakala	Pan-STARRS 1	·	710 m	MPC · JPL
608712	2003 WQ_{215}	—	November 19, 2003	Kitt Peak	Spacewatch	·	2.5 km	MPC · JPL
608713	2003 XA_{24}	—	December 1, 2003	Kitt Peak	Spacewatch	·	1.6 km	MPC · JPL
608714	2003 XP_{24}	—	November 20, 2003	Kitt Peak	Spacewatch	·	2.2 km	MPC · JPL
608715	2003 XE_{25}	—	November 20, 2003	Kitt Peak	Spacewatch	·	1.4 km	MPC · JPL
608716	2003 XS_{28}	—	December 1, 2003	Kitt Peak	Spacewatch	·	860 m	MPC · JPL
608717	2003 XN_{29}	—	December 1, 2003	Kitt Peak	Spacewatch	·	1.3 km	MPC · JPL
608718	2003 XX_{44}	—	December 22, 2012	Haleakala	Pan-STARRS 1	·	1.5 km	MPC · JPL
608719	2003 XZ_{44}	—	May 27, 2014	Mount Lemmon	Mount Lemmon Survey	ADE	1.8 km	MPC · JPL
608720	2003 XJ_{45}	—	February 5, 2011	Haleakala	Pan-STARRS 1	·	2.5 km	MPC · JPL
608721	2003 XV_{45}	—	October 22, 2016	Mount Lemmon	Mount Lemmon Survey	·	1.5 km	MPC · JPL
608722	2003 XG_{46}	—	December 10, 2009	Mount Lemmon	Mount Lemmon Survey	·	2.6 km	MPC · JPL
608723	2003 YN_{2}	—	December 17, 2003	Socorro	LINEAR	H	450 m	MPC · JPL
608724	2003 YF_{8}	—	December 18, 2003	Socorro	LINEAR	PHO	1.0 km	MPC · JPL
608725	2003 YL_{8}	—	December 19, 2003	Socorro	LINEAR	H	510 m	MPC · JPL
608726	2003 YA_{59}	—	March 26, 2001	Kitt Peak	Deep Ecliptic Survey	NYS	1.2 km	MPC · JPL
608727	2003 YO_{67}	—	December 19, 2003	Kitt Peak	Spacewatch	·	1.8 km	MPC · JPL
608728	2003 YE_{68}	—	December 19, 2003	Kitt Peak	Spacewatch	·	1.6 km	MPC · JPL
608729	2003 YA_{72}	—	December 18, 2003	Socorro	LINEAR	·	2.1 km	MPC · JPL
608730	2003 YA_{104}	—	December 16, 2003	Kitt Peak	Spacewatch	·	1.4 km	MPC · JPL
608731	2003 YH_{120}	—	December 27, 2003	Socorro	LINEAR	EUN	1.3 km	MPC · JPL
608732	2003 YO_{123}	—	December 28, 2003	Kitt Peak	Spacewatch	·	1.8 km	MPC · JPL
608733	2003 YU_{134}	—	December 28, 2003	Kitt Peak	Spacewatch	HNS	1.4 km	MPC · JPL
608734	2003 YZ_{151}	—	December 29, 2003	Socorro	LINEAR	·	2.2 km	MPC · JPL
608735	2003 YR_{157}	—	November 20, 2003	Kitt Peak	Spacewatch	·	2.0 km	MPC · JPL
608736	2003 YA_{158}	—	December 17, 2003	Kitt Peak	Spacewatch	·	3.4 km	MPC · JPL
608737	2003 YJ_{172}	—	December 18, 2003	Kitt Peak	Spacewatch	·	1.9 km	MPC · JPL
608738	2003 YL_{172}	—	December 18, 2003	Kitt Peak	Spacewatch	·	990 m	MPC · JPL
608739	2003 YH_{177}	—	November 24, 2003	Kitt Peak	Spacewatch	·	3.4 km	MPC · JPL
608740	2003 YD_{183}	—	December 13, 2010	Mount Lemmon	Mount Lemmon Survey	·	1.1 km	MPC · JPL
608741	2003 YF_{183}	—	December 22, 2003	Kitt Peak	Spacewatch	·	1.2 km	MPC · JPL
608742	2003 YJ_{183}	—	December 18, 2003	Kitt Peak	Spacewatch	·	930 m	MPC · JPL
608743	2003 YO_{183}	—	March 13, 2008	Mauna Kea	F. Bernardi, M. Micheli	·	700 m	MPC · JPL
608744	2003 YC_{184}	—	April 7, 2014	Mount Lemmon	Mount Lemmon Survey	·	1.7 km	MPC · JPL
608745	2003 YD_{184}	—	February 13, 2008	Mount Lemmon	Mount Lemmon Survey	·	940 m	MPC · JPL
608746	2003 YE_{184}	—	December 6, 2012	Nogales	M. Schwartz, P. R. Holvorcem	·	2.0 km	MPC · JPL
608747	2003 YX_{184}	—	October 19, 2007	Kitt Peak	Spacewatch	·	1.8 km	MPC · JPL
608748	2003 YR_{185}	—	January 1, 2009	Kitt Peak	Spacewatch	·	1.5 km	MPC · JPL
608749	2003 YL_{187}	—	January 13, 2008	Kitt Peak	Spacewatch	MAS	670 m	MPC · JPL
608750	2003 YV_{187}	—	April 4, 2014	Haleakala	Pan-STARRS 1	NEM	2.0 km	MPC · JPL
608751	2003 YO_{188}	—	October 15, 2007	Mount Lemmon	Mount Lemmon Survey	·	1.8 km	MPC · JPL
608752	2003 YP_{188}	—	October 9, 2007	Mount Lemmon	Mount Lemmon Survey	·	1.6 km	MPC · JPL
608753	2003 YY_{188}	—	March 27, 2012	Kitt Peak	Spacewatch	V	480 m	MPC · JPL
608754	2003 YC_{190}	—	December 22, 2003	Kitt Peak	Spacewatch	MAS	490 m	MPC · JPL
608755	2003 YL_{190}	—	October 10, 2008	Mount Lemmon	Mount Lemmon Survey	·	2.5 km	MPC · JPL
608756	2004 AS_{3}	—	January 13, 2004	Anderson Mesa	LONEOS	·	1.8 km	MPC · JPL
608757	2004 AF_{8}	—	January 13, 2004	Palomar	NEAT	H	580 m	MPC · JPL
608758	2004 AL_{10}	—	January 15, 2004	Kitt Peak	Spacewatch	·	1.7 km	MPC · JPL
608759	2004 AY_{17}	—	January 15, 2004	Kitt Peak	Spacewatch	MRX	890 m	MPC · JPL
608760	2004 AV_{22}	—	January 15, 2004	Kitt Peak	Spacewatch	MAS	530 m	MPC · JPL
608761	2004 AN_{27}	—	September 19, 2014	Haleakala	Pan-STARRS 1	·	2.6 km	MPC · JPL
608762	2004 BE	—	January 16, 2004	Palomar	NEAT	H	440 m	MPC · JPL
608763	2004 BF	—	January 16, 2004	Palomar	NEAT	H	560 m	MPC · JPL
608764	2004 BG_{2}	—	January 16, 2004	Palomar	NEAT	·	1.0 km	MPC · JPL
608765	2004 BD_{26}	—	January 18, 2004	Needville	J. Dellinger	·	3.2 km	MPC · JPL
608766	2004 BX_{45}	—	January 21, 2004	Socorro	LINEAR	·	1.8 km	MPC · JPL
608767	2004 BC_{60}	—	June 28, 2001	Kitt Peak	Spacewatch	GEF	1.5 km	MPC · JPL
608768	2004 BT_{66}	—	January 16, 2004	Kitt Peak	Spacewatch	·	1.9 km	MPC · JPL
608769	2004 BC_{68}	—	January 16, 2004	Palomar	NEAT	H	450 m	MPC · JPL
608770	2004 BT_{85}	—	January 22, 2004	Socorro	LINEAR	H	410 m	MPC · JPL
608771	2004 BZ_{112}	—	January 27, 2004	Kitt Peak	Spacewatch	·	770 m	MPC · JPL
608772	2004 BD_{118}	—	December 28, 2003	Anderson Mesa	LONEOS	·	1.8 km	MPC · JPL
608773	2004 BF_{127}	—	January 16, 2004	Kitt Peak	Spacewatch	MRX	660 m	MPC · JPL
608774	2004 BP_{130}	—	January 16, 2004	Kitt Peak	Spacewatch	·	1.6 km	MPC · JPL
608775	2004 BZ_{134}	—	January 18, 2004	Kitt Peak	Spacewatch	·	1.4 km	MPC · JPL
608776	2004 BO_{135}	—	January 19, 2004	Kitt Peak	Spacewatch	·	1.2 km	MPC · JPL
608777	2004 BC_{136}	—	January 19, 2004	Kitt Peak	Spacewatch	·	640 m	MPC · JPL
608778	2004 BC_{139}	—	January 19, 2004	Kitt Peak	Spacewatch	·	1.4 km	MPC · JPL
608779	2004 BG_{141}	—	January 19, 2004	Kitt Peak	Spacewatch	·	1.5 km	MPC · JPL
608780	2004 BC_{142}	—	January 19, 2004	Kitt Peak	Spacewatch	·	1.9 km	MPC · JPL
608781	2004 BV_{142}	—	January 19, 2004	Kitt Peak	Spacewatch	·	740 m	MPC · JPL
608782	2004 BP_{156}	—	January 28, 2004	Kitt Peak	Spacewatch	·	1.9 km	MPC · JPL
608783	2004 BD_{164}	—	January 17, 2004	Palomar	NEAT	·	2.0 km	MPC · JPL
608784	2004 BH_{164}	—	November 15, 2010	Kitt Peak	Spacewatch	V	650 m	MPC · JPL
608785	2004 BN_{164}	—	February 11, 2008	Mount Lemmon	Mount Lemmon Survey	NYS	860 m	MPC · JPL
608786	2004 BV_{164}	—	February 10, 2014	Haleakala	Pan-STARRS 1	·	2.2 km	MPC · JPL
608787	2004 BF_{165}	—	March 3, 2009	Kitt Peak	Spacewatch	AGN	980 m	MPC · JPL
608788	2004 BP_{165}	—	May 12, 2010	Mount Lemmon	Mount Lemmon Survey	·	2.1 km	MPC · JPL
608789	2004 BD_{166}	—	April 30, 2014	Haleakala	Pan-STARRS 1	·	1.7 km	MPC · JPL
608790	2004 BJ_{166}	—	November 2, 2007	Kitt Peak	Spacewatch	·	1.6 km	MPC · JPL
608791	2004 BK_{166}	—	November 9, 2007	Kitt Peak	Spacewatch	·	1.4 km	MPC · JPL
608792	2004 BN_{166}	—	January 9, 2013	Kitt Peak	Spacewatch	·	1.4 km	MPC · JPL
608793	2004 BU_{166}	—	January 30, 2004	Kitt Peak	Spacewatch	AEO	900 m	MPC · JPL
608794	2004 BB_{167}	—	September 9, 2007	Mount Lemmon	Mount Lemmon Survey	GEF	880 m	MPC · JPL
608795	2004 BE_{167}	—	July 28, 2011	Haleakala	Pan-STARRS 1	·	1.7 km	MPC · JPL
608796	2004 BO_{167}	—	September 18, 2006	Kitt Peak	Spacewatch	·	690 m	MPC · JPL
608797	2004 BA_{169}	—	November 25, 2013	Haleakala	Pan-STARRS 1	H	490 m	MPC · JPL
608798	2004 BP_{169}	—	September 18, 2011	Mount Lemmon	Mount Lemmon Survey	HOF	2.1 km	MPC · JPL
608799	2004 BM_{170}	—	January 28, 2004	Kitt Peak	Spacewatch	·	1.7 km	MPC · JPL
608800	2004 BX_{170}	—	April 8, 2008	Kitt Peak	Spacewatch	·	630 m	MPC · JPL

== 608801–608900 ==
back to top

Designation			Discovery			Properties		Ref
Permanent	Provisional	Named after	Date	Site	Discoverer(s)	Category	Diam.	Ref
608801	2004 BG_{171}	—	May 23, 2014	Mount Lemmon	Mount Lemmon Survey	·	1.5 km	MPC · JPL
608802	2004 BK_{171}	—	August 1, 2015	Haleakala	Pan-STARRS 1	EUN	1.4 km	MPC · JPL
608803	2004 BN_{171}	—	September 21, 2011	Haleakala	Pan-STARRS 1	HOF	2.2 km	MPC · JPL
608804	2004 BQ_{171}	—	November 20, 2009	Mount Lemmon	Mount Lemmon Survey	·	2.8 km	MPC · JPL
608805	2004 BR_{171}	—	December 23, 2012	Haleakala	Pan-STARRS 1	·	1.5 km	MPC · JPL
608806	2004 BQ_{172}	—	February 20, 2009	Kitt Peak	Spacewatch	·	1.4 km	MPC · JPL
608807	2004 BM_{173}	—	January 28, 2004	Kitt Peak	Spacewatch	·	1.2 km	MPC · JPL
608808	2004 CZ_{5}	—	February 10, 2004	Palomar	NEAT	·	1.7 km	MPC · JPL
608809	2004 CP_{6}	—	January 30, 2004	Kitt Peak	Spacewatch	H	320 m	MPC · JPL
608810	2004 CQ_{7}	—	February 10, 2004	Catalina	CSS	·	1.7 km	MPC · JPL
608811	2004 CA_{15}	—	February 11, 2004	Kitt Peak	Spacewatch	AEO	960 m	MPC · JPL
608812	2004 CU_{17}	—	February 10, 2004	Palomar	NEAT	·	930 m	MPC · JPL
608813	2004 CK_{28}	—	January 19, 2004	Kitt Peak	Spacewatch	·	1.8 km	MPC · JPL
608814	2004 CZ_{45}	—	February 13, 2004	Kitt Peak	Spacewatch	·	980 m	MPC · JPL
608815	2004 CC_{54}	—	February 11, 2004	Kitt Peak	Spacewatch	·	1.5 km	MPC · JPL
608816	2004 CS_{65}	—	January 17, 2004	Palomar	NEAT	PHO	890 m	MPC · JPL
608817	2004 CB_{91}	—	February 12, 2004	Kitt Peak	Spacewatch	·	2.1 km	MPC · JPL
608818	2004 CK_{118}	—	February 11, 2004	Kitt Peak	Spacewatch	·	2.0 km	MPC · JPL
608819	2004 CL_{131}	—	August 14, 2006	Palomar	NEAT	·	2.5 km	MPC · JPL
608820	2004 CN_{131}	—	December 25, 2010	Mount Lemmon	Mount Lemmon Survey	·	930 m	MPC · JPL
608821	2004 CP_{131}	—	January 20, 2015	Haleakala	Pan-STARRS 1	·	1.1 km	MPC · JPL
608822	2004 CJ_{132}	—	April 27, 2012	Haleakala	Pan-STARRS 1	H	320 m	MPC · JPL
608823	2004 CY_{132}	—	February 13, 2004	Kitt Peak	Spacewatch	·	1.4 km	MPC · JPL
608824	2004 CC_{134}	—	May 4, 2014	Mount Lemmon	Mount Lemmon Survey	·	1.3 km	MPC · JPL
608825	2004 CY_{134}	—	January 17, 2013	Kitt Peak	Spacewatch	·	1.8 km	MPC · JPL
608826	2004 CP_{135}	—	February 23, 2015	Haleakala	Pan-STARRS 1	H	370 m	MPC · JPL
608827	2004 CQ_{135}	—	February 28, 2008	Kitt Peak	Spacewatch	NYS	860 m	MPC · JPL
608828	2004 DD_{8}	—	February 17, 2004	Kitt Peak	Spacewatch	·	2.0 km	MPC · JPL
608829	2004 DL_{8}	—	February 17, 2004	Kitt Peak	Spacewatch	BRA	1.1 km	MPC · JPL
608830	2004 DL_{39}	—	February 11, 2004	Palomar	NEAT	·	1.5 km	MPC · JPL
608831	2004 DR_{53}	—	February 12, 2004	Kitt Peak	Spacewatch	·	1.5 km	MPC · JPL
608832	2004 DY_{61}	—	February 16, 2004	Kitt Peak	Spacewatch	H	310 m	MPC · JPL
608833	2004 DB_{65}	—	February 11, 2004	Kitt Peak	Spacewatch	AST	1.5 km	MPC · JPL
608834	2004 DX_{67}	—	February 26, 2004	Kitt Peak	Deep Ecliptic Survey	·	1.8 km	MPC · JPL
608835	2004 DR_{76}	—	February 18, 2004	Kitt Peak	Spacewatch	MAS	740 m	MPC · JPL
608836	2004 DC_{78}	—	April 21, 2009	Mount Lemmon	Mount Lemmon Survey	·	2.0 km	MPC · JPL
608837	2004 DP_{80}	—	December 1, 2010	Mount Lemmon	Mount Lemmon Survey	·	1.0 km	MPC · JPL
608838	2004 DS_{80}	—	November 8, 2010	Mount Lemmon	Mount Lemmon Survey	ERI	1.3 km	MPC · JPL
608839	2004 DX_{80}	—	February 17, 2004	Kitt Peak	Spacewatch	NYS	870 m	MPC · JPL
608840	2004 DG_{81}	—	February 28, 2008	Mount Lemmon	Mount Lemmon Survey	NYS	980 m	MPC · JPL
608841	2004 DA_{82}	—	December 21, 2014	Mount Lemmon	Mount Lemmon Survey	·	1.0 km	MPC · JPL
608842	2004 DB_{82}	—	March 19, 2009	Kitt Peak	Spacewatch	·	2.2 km	MPC · JPL
608843	2004 DF_{83}	—	January 27, 2015	Haleakala	Pan-STARRS 1	·	720 m	MPC · JPL
608844	2004 DY_{84}	—	October 24, 2011	Haleakala	Pan-STARRS 1	·	1.7 km	MPC · JPL
608845	2004 DJ_{85}	—	April 24, 2008	Mount Lemmon	Mount Lemmon Survey	·	1.2 km	MPC · JPL
608846	2004 DB_{87}	—	January 1, 2008	Kitt Peak	Spacewatch	·	2.2 km	MPC · JPL
608847	2004 DE_{87}	—	January 21, 2013	Haleakala	Pan-STARRS 1	·	2.1 km	MPC · JPL
608848	2004 DK_{87}	—	March 27, 2008	Kitt Peak	Spacewatch	·	890 m	MPC · JPL
608849	2004 DN_{87}	—	September 23, 2011	Kitt Peak	Spacewatch	·	1.7 km	MPC · JPL
608850	2004 EP_{2}	—	March 13, 2004	Palomar	NEAT	·	1.2 km	MPC · JPL
608851	2004 EO_{4}	—	March 10, 2004	Palomar	NEAT	·	2.3 km	MPC · JPL
608852	2004 EX_{12}	—	March 11, 2004	Palomar	NEAT	·	1.1 km	MPC · JPL
608853	2004 EN_{33}	—	March 12, 2004	Andrushivka	Andrushivka	·	1.1 km	MPC · JPL
608854	2004 EX_{46}	—	March 15, 2004	Kitt Peak	Spacewatch	·	870 m	MPC · JPL
608855	2004 EK_{51}	—	March 14, 2004	Kitt Peak	Spacewatch	·	1.9 km	MPC · JPL
608856	2004 EE_{67}	—	March 15, 2004	Kitt Peak	Spacewatch	·	2.1 km	MPC · JPL
608857	2004 EE_{70}	—	March 15, 2004	Kitt Peak	Spacewatch	·	1.9 km	MPC · JPL
608858	2004 EB_{72}	—	February 23, 2004	Socorro	LINEAR	PHO	900 m	MPC · JPL
608859	2004 EV_{87}	—	March 14, 2004	Kitt Peak	Spacewatch	·	730 m	MPC · JPL
608860	2004 EM_{92}	—	March 15, 2004	Kitt Peak	Spacewatch	·	950 m	MPC · JPL
608861	2004 EA_{102}	—	March 15, 2004	Kitt Peak	Spacewatch	·	1.8 km	MPC · JPL
608862	2004 EB_{102}	—	March 15, 2004	Kitt Peak	Spacewatch	·	1.8 km	MPC · JPL
608863	2004 EM_{103}	—	March 15, 2004	Kitt Peak	Spacewatch	·	1.8 km	MPC · JPL
608864	2004 EB_{111}	—	March 15, 2004	Kitt Peak	Spacewatch	·	1.3 km	MPC · JPL
608865	2004 EX_{116}	—	February 9, 2013	Haleakala	Pan-STARRS 1	·	1.8 km	MPC · JPL
608866	2004 EP_{117}	—	June 28, 2005	Kitt Peak	Spacewatch	·	2.9 km	MPC · JPL
608867	2004 FS_{5}	—	March 19, 2004	Palomar	NEAT	H	540 m	MPC · JPL
608868	2004 FP_{53}	—	March 17, 2004	Kitt Peak	Spacewatch	·	2.1 km	MPC · JPL
608869	2004 FY_{57}	—	March 17, 2004	Kitt Peak	Spacewatch	CLA	1.3 km	MPC · JPL
608870	2004 FW_{73}	—	March 17, 2004	Kitt Peak	Spacewatch	AGN	1.0 km	MPC · JPL
608871	2004 FK_{77}	—	March 18, 2004	Socorro	LINEAR	·	1.7 km	MPC · JPL
608872	2004 FG_{111}	—	March 26, 2004	Socorro	LINEAR	·	1 km	MPC · JPL
608873	2004 FP_{124}	—	March 27, 2004	Kitt Peak	Spacewatch	·	1.9 km	MPC · JPL
608874	2004 FD_{133}	—	March 23, 2004	Socorro	LINEAR	·	2.3 km	MPC · JPL
608875	2004 FL_{141}	—	March 14, 2004	Palomar	NEAT	·	1.9 km	MPC · JPL
608876	2004 FA_{147}	—	March 23, 2004	Catalina	CSS	GAL	2.0 km	MPC · JPL
608877	2004 FR_{150}	—	March 16, 2004	Kitt Peak	Spacewatch	·	1.7 km	MPC · JPL
608878	2004 FV_{150}	—	March 16, 2004	Kitt Peak	Spacewatch	·	950 m	MPC · JPL
608879	2004 FZ_{150}	—	March 16, 2004	Kitt Peak	Spacewatch	·	1.7 km	MPC · JPL
608880	2004 FF_{151}	—	March 16, 2004	Kitt Peak	Spacewatch	NYS	1.2 km	MPC · JPL
608881	2004 FS_{153}	—	February 13, 2004	Kitt Peak	Spacewatch	·	2.2 km	MPC · JPL
608882	2004 FU_{153}	—	March 17, 2004	Kitt Peak	Spacewatch	H	310 m	MPC · JPL
608883	2004 FR_{167}	—	April 15, 2008	Mount Lemmon	Mount Lemmon Survey	·	970 m	MPC · JPL
608884	2004 FZ_{167}	—	September 19, 2006	Kitt Peak	Spacewatch	·	1.7 km	MPC · JPL
608885	2004 FS_{168}	—	November 16, 2006	Kitt Peak	Spacewatch	MAS	460 m	MPC · JPL
608886	2004 FY_{168}	—	March 5, 2013	Mount Lemmon	Mount Lemmon Survey	·	1.6 km	MPC · JPL
608887	2004 FP_{169}	—	December 22, 2012	Haleakala	Pan-STARRS 1	GEF	1 km	MPC · JPL
608888	2004 FC_{170}	—	January 9, 2013	Kitt Peak	Spacewatch	·	2.0 km	MPC · JPL
608889	2004 FE_{170}	—	October 31, 2010	Mount Lemmon	Mount Lemmon Survey	H	410 m	MPC · JPL
608890	2004 FK_{170}	—	October 4, 2005	Mount Lemmon	Mount Lemmon Survey	·	610 m	MPC · JPL
608891	2004 FP_{170}	—	October 28, 2011	Catalina	CSS	·	2.4 km	MPC · JPL
608892	2004 FO_{171}	—	October 26, 2011	Haleakala	Pan-STARRS 1	AGN	1.0 km	MPC · JPL
608893	2004 FX_{171}	—	March 31, 1995	Kitt Peak	Spacewatch	·	1.8 km	MPC · JPL
608894	2004 FS_{172}	—	September 24, 2011	Haleakala	Pan-STARRS 1	·	1.5 km	MPC · JPL
608895	2004 FT_{172}	—	January 17, 2013	Haleakala	Pan-STARRS 1	HOF	2.1 km	MPC · JPL
608896	2004 FU_{172}	—	August 27, 2016	Haleakala	Pan-STARRS 1	V	460 m	MPC · JPL
608897	2004 FD_{173}	—	March 21, 2004	Kitt Peak	Spacewatch	·	1.6 km	MPC · JPL
608898	2004 FG_{173}	—	January 16, 2018	Haleakala	Pan-STARRS 1	GEF	990 m	MPC · JPL
608899	2004 FM_{173}	—	December 30, 2007	Kitt Peak	Spacewatch	·	1.5 km	MPC · JPL
608900	2004 FQ_{173}	—	February 16, 2015	Haleakala	Pan-STARRS 1	·	770 m	MPC · JPL

== 608901–609000 ==
back to top

Designation			Discovery			Properties		Ref
Permanent	Provisional	Named after	Date	Site	Discoverer(s)	Category	Diam.	Ref
608901	2004 FO_{175}	—	April 27, 2009	Mount Lemmon	Mount Lemmon Survey	·	1.6 km	MPC · JPL
608902	2004 FZ_{177}	—	March 18, 2004	Kitt Peak	Spacewatch	·	1.7 km	MPC · JPL
608903	2004 GQ_{4}	—	April 11, 2004	Palomar	NEAT	·	1.2 km	MPC · JPL
608904	2004 GK_{5}	—	April 11, 2004	Palomar	NEAT	·	2.7 km	MPC · JPL
608905	2004 GY_{5}	—	April 12, 2004	Palomar	NEAT	·	1.0 km	MPC · JPL
608906	2004 GX_{24}	—	April 13, 2004	Palomar	NEAT	H	480 m	MPC · JPL
608907	2004 GQ_{50}	—	April 12, 2004	Kitt Peak	Spacewatch	·	2.1 km	MPC · JPL
608908	2004 GS_{62}	—	March 16, 2004	Kitt Peak	Spacewatch	DOR	1.9 km	MPC · JPL
608909	2004 GG_{67}	—	April 13, 2004	Kitt Peak	Spacewatch	·	2.0 km	MPC · JPL
608910	2004 GS_{71}	—	April 14, 2004	Kitt Peak	Spacewatch	DOR	2.5 km	MPC · JPL
608911	2004 GX_{87}	—	April 15, 2004	Anderson Mesa	LONEOS	·	1.3 km	MPC · JPL
608912	2004 GG_{89}	—	February 13, 2011	Mount Lemmon	Mount Lemmon Survey	·	1.0 km	MPC · JPL
608913	2004 GQ_{89}	—	September 29, 2011	Kitt Peak	Spacewatch	·	1.7 km	MPC · JPL
608914	2004 GX_{89}	—	October 4, 2013	Kitt Peak	Spacewatch	V	480 m	MPC · JPL
608915	2004 HM_{21}	—	March 26, 2004	Kitt Peak	Spacewatch	·	1.7 km	MPC · JPL
608916	2004 HO_{23}	—	April 16, 2004	Kitt Peak	Spacewatch	·	1.1 km	MPC · JPL
608917	2004 HP_{52}	—	April 24, 2004	Socorro	LINEAR	·	1.9 km	MPC · JPL
608918	2004 HA_{55}	—	April 10, 2004	Palomar	NEAT	·	2.2 km	MPC · JPL
608919	2004 HZ_{70}	—	April 24, 2004	Bergisch Gladbach	W. Bickel	PHO	690 m	MPC · JPL
608920	2004 HZ_{79}	—	August 29, 2009	Kitt Peak	Spacewatch	·	1.1 km	MPC · JPL
608921	2004 HJ_{81}	—	October 19, 2011	Mount Lemmon	Mount Lemmon Survey	·	1.8 km	MPC · JPL
608922	2004 HN_{81}	—	April 27, 2012	Haleakala	Pan-STARRS 1	·	740 m	MPC · JPL
608923	2004 HU_{81}	—	September 25, 2006	Kitt Peak	Spacewatch	GEF	1.3 km	MPC · JPL
608924	2004 HT_{83}	—	March 18, 2013	Mount Lemmon	Mount Lemmon Survey	MRX	830 m	MPC · JPL
608925	2004 HX_{83}	—	January 8, 2011	Mount Lemmon	Mount Lemmon Survey	·	820 m	MPC · JPL
608926	2004 HZ_{83}	—	November 4, 2016	Haleakala	Pan-STARRS 1	·	2.2 km	MPC · JPL
608927	2004 JG_{12}	—	March 15, 2004	Palomar	NEAT	·	1.7 km	MPC · JPL
608928	2004 JJ_{38}	—	May 14, 2004	Kitt Peak	Spacewatch	H	460 m	MPC · JPL
608929	2004 JD_{48}	—	May 13, 2004	Kitt Peak	Spacewatch	·	1.8 km	MPC · JPL
608930	2004 JA_{57}	—	October 28, 2008	Kitt Peak	Spacewatch	·	580 m	MPC · JPL
608931	2004 KQ_{19}	—	January 10, 2011	Mount Lemmon	Mount Lemmon Survey	·	1.3 km	MPC · JPL
608932	2004 KB_{20}	—	September 8, 2015	Haleakala	Pan-STARRS 1	·	2.6 km	MPC · JPL
608933	2004 LE_{19}	—	June 11, 2004	Kitt Peak	Spacewatch	·	2.0 km	MPC · JPL
608934	2004 LC_{29}	—	June 14, 2004	Kitt Peak	Spacewatch	·	2.2 km	MPC · JPL
608935	2004 LR_{29}	—	June 14, 2004	Kitt Peak	Spacewatch	EUN	1.0 km	MPC · JPL
608936	2004 LH_{33}	—	June 11, 2004	Kitt Peak	Spacewatch	·	1.4 km	MPC · JPL
608937	2004 MA_{9}	—	February 23, 2007	Mount Lemmon	Mount Lemmon Survey	NYS	1.1 km	MPC · JPL
608938	2004 MO_{9}	—	December 13, 2006	Kitt Peak	Spacewatch	·	2.8 km	MPC · JPL
608939	2004 NV_{5}	—	June 11, 2004	Kitt Peak	Spacewatch	·	1.2 km	MPC · JPL
608940	2004 NC_{17}	—	June 22, 2004	Kitt Peak	Spacewatch	·	620 m	MPC · JPL
608941	2004 NW_{18}	—	June 15, 2004	Kitt Peak	Spacewatch	·	980 m	MPC · JPL
608942	2004 OU_{9}	—	July 19, 2004	Reedy Creek	J. Broughton	·	960 m	MPC · JPL
608943	2004 OR_{13}	—	July 22, 2004	Mauna Kea	Veillet, C.	EOS	1.4 km	MPC · JPL
608944	2004 OW_{15}	—	July 16, 2004	Cerro Tololo	Deep Ecliptic Survey	·	620 m	MPC · JPL
608945	2004 OJ_{16}	—	March 18, 2010	Mount Lemmon	Mount Lemmon Survey	·	440 m	MPC · JPL
608946	2004 OG_{17}	—	July 17, 2004	Cerro Tololo	Deep Ecliptic Survey	·	730 m	MPC · JPL
608947	2004 OH_{17}	—	July 17, 2004	Cerro Tololo	Deep Ecliptic Survey	·	2.2 km	MPC · JPL
608948	2004 OJ_{17}	—	July 22, 2004	Siding Spring	R. H. McNaught	EOS	1.4 km	MPC · JPL
608949	2004 OO_{17}	—	July 16, 2004	Cerro Tololo	Deep Ecliptic Survey	·	1.3 km	MPC · JPL
608950	2004 PG_{12}	—	August 7, 2004	Palomar	NEAT	·	2.1 km	MPC · JPL
608951	2004 PT_{14}	—	August 7, 2004	Palomar	NEAT	·	1.4 km	MPC · JPL
608952	2004 PL_{43}	—	August 6, 2004	Palomar	NEAT	·	1.2 km	MPC · JPL
608953	2004 PY_{59}	—	August 9, 2004	Anderson Mesa	LONEOS	·	1.8 km	MPC · JPL
608954	2004 PE_{114}	—	August 5, 2004	Palomar	NEAT	·	580 m	MPC · JPL
608955	2004 PT_{114}	—	August 13, 2004	Cerro Tololo	Deep Ecliptic Survey	·	2.1 km	MPC · JPL
608956	2004 PB_{116}	—	December 6, 2005	Kitt Peak	Spacewatch	·	910 m	MPC · JPL
608957	2004 PN_{117}	—	August 23, 2004	Kitt Peak	Spacewatch	·	1.9 km	MPC · JPL
608958	2004 PH_{119}	—	February 16, 2013	Kitt Peak	Spacewatch	·	470 m	MPC · JPL
608959	2004 PX_{121}	—	August 14, 2004	Cerro Tololo	Deep Ecliptic Survey	·	1.7 km	MPC · JPL
608960	2004 QL_{15}	—	August 23, 2004	Kitt Peak	Spacewatch	EOS	1.3 km	MPC · JPL
608961	2004 QY_{16}	—	August 25, 2004	Wrightwood	J. Bauer, D. Mayes	·	620 m	MPC · JPL
608962	2004 QO_{29}	—	October 29, 2010	Mount Lemmon	Mount Lemmon Survey	·	1.9 km	MPC · JPL
608963	2004 QR_{29}	—	November 5, 2005	Kitt Peak	Spacewatch	·	2.7 km	MPC · JPL
608964	2004 QA_{30}	—	August 22, 2004	Kitt Peak	Spacewatch	·	620 m	MPC · JPL
608965	2004 QM_{30}	—	January 26, 2014	Haleakala	Pan-STARRS 1	·	1.3 km	MPC · JPL
608966	2004 QN_{30}	—	November 27, 2009	Mount Lemmon	Mount Lemmon Survey	(5)	930 m	MPC · JPL
608967	2004 QY_{30}	—	July 29, 2008	Mount Lemmon	Mount Lemmon Survey	·	1.1 km	MPC · JPL
608968	2004 QD_{31}	—	October 31, 2010	Mount Lemmon	Mount Lemmon Survey	·	1.8 km	MPC · JPL
608969	2004 QB_{32}	—	October 28, 2010	Mount Lemmon	Mount Lemmon Survey	·	1.8 km	MPC · JPL
608970	2004 QW_{33}	—	August 6, 2012	Haleakala	Pan-STARRS 1	EUN	880 m	MPC · JPL
608971	2004 QP_{35}	—	August 25, 2004	Kitt Peak	Spacewatch	EOS	1.5 km	MPC · JPL
608972	2004 QV_{35}	—	March 13, 2007	Mount Lemmon	Mount Lemmon Survey	·	910 m	MPC · JPL
608973	2004 QN_{36}	—	November 12, 2010	Mount Lemmon	Mount Lemmon Survey	EMA	2.2 km	MPC · JPL
608974	2004 QA_{37}	—	August 23, 2004	Kitt Peak	Spacewatch	THM	1.6 km	MPC · JPL
608975	2004 RK_{13}	—	September 5, 2004	Kleť	J. Tichá, M. Tichý	·	2.2 km	MPC · JPL
608976	2004 RQ_{13}	—	September 6, 2004	Needville	Needville	·	1.8 km	MPC · JPL
608977	2004 RP_{61}	—	September 8, 2004	Socorro	LINEAR	·	1.9 km	MPC · JPL
608978	2004 RX_{72}	—	September 6, 2004	Vail-Jarnac	Jarnac	·	670 m	MPC · JPL
608979	2004 RK_{79}	—	September 8, 2004	Palomar	NEAT	·	720 m	MPC · JPL
608980	2004 RT_{93}	—	September 8, 2004	Socorro	LINEAR	·	2.5 km	MPC · JPL
608981	2004 RA_{96}	—	August 25, 2004	Kitt Peak	Spacewatch	·	1.8 km	MPC · JPL
608982	2004 RZ_{100}	—	August 10, 2004	Socorro	LINEAR	·	2.3 km	MPC · JPL
608983	2004 RE_{108}	—	August 25, 2004	Kitt Peak	Spacewatch	·	1.1 km	MPC · JPL
608984	2004 RX_{121}	—	September 7, 2004	Kitt Peak	Spacewatch	·	1.7 km	MPC · JPL
608985	2004 RN_{124}	—	September 7, 2004	Kitt Peak	Spacewatch	·	1.2 km	MPC · JPL
608986	2004 RG_{125}	—	September 7, 2004	Kitt Peak	Spacewatch	·	1.9 km	MPC · JPL
608987	2004 RQ_{126}	—	September 7, 2004	Kitt Peak	Spacewatch	·	490 m	MPC · JPL
608988	2004 RS_{128}	—	September 7, 2004	Kitt Peak	Spacewatch	·	450 m	MPC · JPL
608989	2004 RC_{129}	—	September 7, 2004	Kitt Peak	Spacewatch	·	2.0 km	MPC · JPL
608990	2004 RB_{131}	—	September 7, 2004	Kitt Peak	Spacewatch	EOS	1.4 km	MPC · JPL
608991	2004 RG_{134}	—	September 7, 2004	Kitt Peak	Spacewatch	·	790 m	MPC · JPL
608992	2004 RQ_{134}	—	September 7, 2004	Kitt Peak	Spacewatch	·	2.0 km	MPC · JPL
608993	2004 RV_{134}	—	September 7, 2004	Kitt Peak	Spacewatch	·	1.4 km	MPC · JPL
608994	2004 RT_{135}	—	September 7, 2004	Kitt Peak	Spacewatch	·	1.7 km	MPC · JPL
608995	2004 RM_{136}	—	September 7, 2004	Palomar	NEAT	(1547)	1.3 km	MPC · JPL
608996	2004 RE_{142}	—	September 8, 2004	Socorro	LINEAR	(5)	1.5 km	MPC · JPL
608997	2004 RT_{142}	—	September 8, 2004	Socorro	LINEAR	·	1.3 km	MPC · JPL
608998	2004 RF_{163}	—	September 12, 1994	Kitt Peak	Spacewatch	EOS	1.5 km	MPC · JPL
608999	2004 RR_{168}	—	September 8, 2004	Socorro	LINEAR	·	540 m	MPC · JPL
609000	2004 RC_{182}	—	September 10, 2004	Socorro	LINEAR	·	470 m	MPC · JPL

back to top
