= James Bauer (astronomer) =

American astronomer

James "Gerbs" Bauer (born 1968 in Michigan, USA) is an American astronomer who studies comets and related bodies. He was the first to quantify the seasonal surface changes on Neptune's moon Triton. He also observed the aftermath of the Deep Impact probe's collision with comet Tempel 1.

Comet Tempel-Tuttle was recovered on March 4, 1997 by Karen Meech, Olivier Hainaut and James Bauer at the University of Hawai`i. At the time it was very faint (22.5 mag), but the recovery proved that it was returning on schedule and that its orbit was very well determined.

Currently, he is the deputy PI of the Wide-field Infrared Survey Explorer mission. His analysis of the images of comet Hartley 2 taken by the WISE spacecraft revealed that the object was shedding mass. The asteroid 16232 Chijagerbs is named after him and his wife, Chija Bauer. They have one daughter and one son.
