= List of minor planets: 5001–6000 =

The following is a partial list of minor planets, running from minor-planet number 5001 through 6000, inclusive. The primary data for this and other partial lists is based on JPL's "Small-Body Orbital Elements" and data available from the Minor Planet Center. Critical list information is also provided by the MPC, unless otherwise specified from Lowell Observatory. A detailed description of the table's columns and additional sources are given on the main page including a complete list of every page in this series, and a statistical break-up on the dynamical classification of minor planets.

Also see the summary list of all named bodies in numerical and alphabetical order, and the corresponding naming citations for the number range of this particular list. New namings may only be added to this list after official publication, as the preannouncement of names is condemned by the Working Group for Small Bodies Nomenclature of the International Astronomical Union.

Near-Earth obj.	MBA (inner)	MBA (outer)	Centaur
Mars-crosser	MBA (middle)	Jupiter trojan	Trans-Neptunian obj.
Unclassified

== 5001–5100 ==
Designation			Discovery			Properties		Ref
Permanent	Provisional	Named after	Date	Site	Discoverer(s)	Category	Diam.	Ref
5001 EMP	1987 SB_{1}	EMP	September 19, 1987	Anderson Mesa	E. Bowell	EUN	9.7 km (6.0 mi)	MPC · JPL
5002 Marnix	1987 SS_{3}	Marnix	September 20, 1987	Smolyan	E. W. Elst	·	4.7 km (2.9 mi)	MPC · JPL
5003 Silvanominuto	1988 ER_{2}	Silvanominuto	March 15, 1988	La Silla	W. Ferreri	·	3.9 km (2.4 mi)	MPC · JPL
5004 Bruch	1988 RR_{3}	Bruch	September 8, 1988	Tautenburg Observatory	F. Börngen	·	3.6 km (2.2 mi)	MPC · JPL
5005 Kegler	1988 UB	Kegler	October 16, 1988	Kushiro	S. Ueda, H. Kaneda	·	3.5 km (2.2 mi)	MPC · JPL
5006 Teller	1989 GL_{5}	Teller	April 5, 1989	Palomar	E. F. Helin	·	13 km (8.1 mi)	MPC · JPL
5007 Keay	1990 UH_{2}	Keay	October 20, 1990	Siding Spring	R. H. McNaught	EUN	7.3 km (4.5 mi)	MPC · JPL
5008 Miyazawakenji	1991 DV	Miyazawakenji	February 20, 1991	Dynic	A. Sugie	·	7.2 km (4.5 mi)	MPC · JPL
5009 Sethos	2562 P-L	Sethos	September 24, 1960	Palomar	C. J. van Houten, I. van Houten-Groeneveld, T. Gehrels	·	3.4 km (2.1 mi)	MPC · JPL
5010 Amenemhêt	4594 P-L	Amenemhêt	September 24, 1960	Palomar	C. J. van Houten, I. van Houten-Groeneveld, T. Gehrels	·	10 km (6.2 mi)	MPC · JPL
5011 Ptah	6743 P-L	Ptah	September 24, 1960	Palomar	C. J. van Houten, I. van Houten-Groeneveld, T. Gehrels	APO +1 km (0.62 mi) · PHA	1.7 km (1.1 mi)	MPC · JPL
5012 Eurymedon	9507 P-L	Eurymedon	October 17, 1960	Palomar	C. J. van Houten, I. van Houten-Groeneveld, T. Gehrels	L4	37 km (23 mi)	MPC · JPL
5013 Suzhousanzhong	1964 VT_{1}	Suzhousanzhong	November 9, 1964	Nanking	Purple Mountain	·	10 km (6.2 mi)	MPC · JPL
5014 Gorchakov	1974 ST	Gorchakov	September 19, 1974	Nauchnij	L. I. Chernykh	(3460)	19 km (12 mi)	MPC · JPL
5015 Litke	1975 VP	Litke	November 1, 1975	Nauchnij	T. M. Smirnova	·	4.1 km (2.5 mi)	MPC · JPL
5016 Migirenko	1976 GX_{3}	Migirenko	April 2, 1976	Nauchnij	N. S. Chernykh	·	5.4 km (3.4 mi)	MPC · JPL
5017 Tenchi	1977 DS_{2}	Tenchi	February 18, 1977	Kiso	H. Kosai, K. Furukawa	(1118)	22 km (14 mi)	MPC · JPL
5018 Tenmu	1977 DY_{8}	Tenmu	February 19, 1977	Kiso	H. Kosai, K. Furukawa	·	3.8 km (2.4 mi)	MPC · JPL
5019 Erfjord	1979 MS_{6}	Erfjord	June 25, 1979	Siding Spring	E. F. Helin, S. J. Bus	V	5.2 km (3.2 mi)	MPC · JPL
5020 Asimov	1981 EX_{19}	Asimov	March 2, 1981	Siding Spring	S. J. Bus	·	3.5 km (2.2 mi)	MPC · JPL
5021 Krylania	1982 VK_{12}	Krylania	November 13, 1982	Nauchnij	L. G. Karachkina	THM	18 km (11 mi)	MPC · JPL
5022 Roccapalumba	1984 HE_{1}	Roccapalumba	April 23, 1984	La Silla	W. Ferreri	·	33 km (21 mi)	MPC · JPL
5023 Agapenor	1985 TG_{3}	Agapenor	October 11, 1985	Palomar	C. S. Shoemaker, E. M. Shoemaker	L4	28 km (17 mi)	MPC · JPL
5024 Bechmann	1985 VP	Bechmann	November 14, 1985	Brorfelde	P. Jensen	(1118)	27 km (17 mi)	MPC · JPL
5025 Mecisteus	1986 TS_{6}	Mecisteus	October 5, 1986	Piwnice	M. Antal	L4 · slow?	40 km (25 mi)	MPC · JPL
5026 Martes	1987 QL_{1}	Martes	August 22, 1987	Kleť	A. Mrkos	ERI	7.5 km (4.7 mi)	MPC · JPL
5027 Androgeos	1988 BX_{1}	Androgeos	January 21, 1988	Palomar	C. S. Shoemaker	L4	60 km (37 mi)	MPC · JPL
5028 Halaesus	1988 BY_{1}	Halaesus	January 23, 1988	Palomar	C. S. Shoemaker	L4	51 km (32 mi)	MPC · JPL
5029 Ireland	1988 BL_{2}	Ireland	January 24, 1988	Palomar	C. S. Shoemaker, E. M. Shoemaker	·	12 km (7.5 mi)	MPC · JPL
5030 Gyldenkerne	1988 VK_{4}	Gyldenkerne	November 3, 1988	Brorfelde	P. Jensen	·	7.5 km (4.7 mi)	MPC · JPL
5031 Švejcar	1990 FW_{1}	Švejcar	March 16, 1990	Kleť	Z. Vávrová	MAS	8.5 km (5.3 mi)	MPC · JPL
5032 Conradhirsh	1990 OO	Conradhirsh	July 18, 1990	Palomar	E. F. Helin	EOS	8.7 km (5.4 mi)	MPC · JPL
5033 Mistral	1990 PF	Mistral	August 15, 1990	Haute-Provence	E. W. Elst	KOR	9.3 km (5.8 mi)	MPC · JPL
5034 Joeharrington	1991 PW_{10}	Joeharrington	August 7, 1991	Palomar	H. E. Holt	·	4.8 km (3.0 mi)	MPC · JPL
5035 Swift	1991 UX	Swift	October 18, 1991	Kushiro	S. Ueda, H. Kaneda	EUN	8.9 km (5.5 mi)	MPC · JPL
5036 Tuttle	1991 US_{2}	Tuttle	October 31, 1991	Kushiro	S. Ueda, H. Kaneda	·	23 km (14 mi)	MPC · JPL
5037 Habing	6552 P-L	Habing	September 24, 1960	Palomar	C. J. van Houten, I. van Houten-Groeneveld, T. Gehrels	moon	5.7 km (3.5 mi)	MPC · JPL
5038 Overbeek	1948 KF	Overbeek	May 31, 1948	Johannesburg	E. L. Johnson	·	3.8 km (2.4 mi)	MPC · JPL
5039 Rosenkavalier	1967 GM_{1}	Rosenkavalier	April 11, 1967	Tautenburg Observatory	F. Börngen	EOS	12 km (7.5 mi)	MPC · JPL
5040 Rabinowitz	1972 RF	Rabinowitz	September 15, 1972	Palomar	T. Gehrels	PHO	7.0 km (4.3 mi)	MPC · JPL
5041 Theotes	1973 SW_{1}	Theotes	September 19, 1973	Palomar	C. J. van Houten, I. van Houten-Groeneveld, T. Gehrels	L4	42 km (26 mi)	MPC · JPL
5042 Colpa	1974 ME	Colpa	June 20, 1974	El Leoncito	Félix Aguilar Observatory	EOS · slow	18 km (11 mi)	MPC · JPL
5043 Zadornov	1974 SB_{5}	Zadornov	September 19, 1974	Nauchnij	L. I. Chernykh	THM	15 km (9.3 mi)	MPC · JPL
5044 Shestaka	1977 QH_{4}	Shestaka	August 18, 1977	Nauchnij	N. S. Chernykh	·	6.4 km (4.0 mi)	MPC · JPL
5045 Hoyin	1978 UL_{2}	Hoyin	October 29, 1978	Nanking	Purple Mountain	THM	10 km (6.2 mi)	MPC · JPL
5046 Carletonmoore	1981 DQ	Carletonmoore	February 28, 1981	Siding Spring	S. J. Bus	·	6.4 km (4.0 mi)	MPC · JPL
5047 Zanda	1981 EO_{42}	Zanda	March 2, 1981	Siding Spring	S. J. Bus	·	6.0 km (3.7 mi)	MPC · JPL
5048 Moriarty	1981 GC	Moriarty	April 1, 1981	Anderson Mesa	E. Bowell	slow	11 km (6.8 mi)	MPC · JPL
5049 Sherlock	1981 VC_{1}	Sherlock	November 2, 1981	Anderson Mesa	E. Bowell	·	5.0 km (3.1 mi)	MPC · JPL
5050 Doctorwatson	1983 RD_{2}	Doctorwatson	September 14, 1983	Anderson Mesa	E. Bowell	·	7.8 km (4.8 mi)	MPC · JPL
5051 Ralph	1984 SM	Ralph	September 24, 1984	Brorfelde	P. Jensen	V	4.6 km (2.9 mi)	MPC · JPL
5052 Nancyruth	1984 UT_{3}	Nancyruth	October 23, 1984	Palomar	C. S. Shoemaker, E. M. Shoemaker	·	4.6 km (2.9 mi)	MPC · JPL
5053 Chladni	1985 FB_{2}	Chladni	March 22, 1985	Anderson Mesa	E. Bowell	·	9.6 km (6.0 mi)	MPC · JPL
5054 Keil	1986 AO_{2}	Keil	January 12, 1986	Anderson Mesa	E. Bowell	·	4.4 km (2.7 mi)	MPC · JPL
5055 Opekushin	1986 PB_{5}	Opekushin	August 13, 1986	Nauchnij	L. I. Chernykh	THM	16 km (9.9 mi)	MPC · JPL
5056 Rahua	1986 RQ_{5}	Rahua	September 9, 1986	La Silla	H. Debehogne	slow	7.3 km (4.5 mi)	MPC · JPL
5057 Weeks	1987 DC_{6}	Weeks	February 22, 1987	La Silla	H. Debehogne	·	16 km (9.9 mi)	MPC · JPL
5058 Tarrega	1987 OM	Tarrega	July 28, 1987	Geisei	T. Seki	·	5.8 km (3.6 mi)	MPC · JPL
5059 Saroma	1988 AF	Saroma	January 11, 1988	Kitami	K. Endate, K. Watanabe	EUN	9.5 km (5.9 mi)	MPC · JPL
5060 Yoneta	1988 BO_{5}	Yoneta	January 24, 1988	Kushiro	S. Ueda, H. Kaneda	·	8.4 km (5.2 mi)	MPC · JPL
5061 McIntosh	1988 DJ	McIntosh	February 22, 1988	Siding Spring	R. H. McNaught	EOS	10 km (6.2 mi)	MPC · JPL
5062 Glennmiller	1989 CZ	Glennmiller	February 6, 1989	Palomar	E. F. Helin	·	4.2 km (2.6 mi)	MPC · JPL
5063 Monteverdi	1989 CJ_{5}	Monteverdi	February 2, 1989	Tautenburg Observatory	F. Börngen	NYS	6.5 km (4.0 mi)	MPC · JPL
5064 Tanchozuru	1990 FS	Tanchozuru	March 16, 1990	Kushiro	Matsuyama, M., K. Watanabe	slow	4.8 km (3.0 mi)	MPC · JPL
5065 Johnstone	1990 FP_{1}	Johnstone	March 24, 1990	Palomar	E. F. Helin	·	13 km (8.1 mi)	MPC · JPL
5066 Garradd	1990 MA	Garradd	June 22, 1990	Siding Spring	R. H. McNaught	·	3.1 km (1.9 mi)	MPC · JPL
5067 Occidental	1990 OX	Occidental	July 19, 1990	Palomar	E. F. Helin	·	10 km (6.2 mi)	MPC · JPL
5068 Cragg	1990 TC	Cragg	October 9, 1990	Siding Spring	R. H. McNaught	·	14 km (8.7 mi)	MPC · JPL
5069 Tokeidai	1991 QB	Tokeidai	August 16, 1991	JCPM Sapporo	K. Watanabe	·	6.2 km (3.9 mi)	MPC · JPL
5070 Arai	1991 XT	Arai	December 9, 1991	Kushiro	S. Ueda, H. Kaneda	·	28 km (17 mi)	MPC · JPL
5071 Schoenmaker	3099 T-2	Schoenmaker	September 30, 1973	Palomar	C. J. van Houten, I. van Houten-Groeneveld, T. Gehrels	·	16 km (9.9 mi)	MPC · JPL
5072 Hioki	1931 TS_{1}	Hioki	October 9, 1931	Heidelberg	K. Reinmuth	KOR	7.5 km (4.7 mi)	MPC · JPL
5073 Junttura	1943 EN	Junttura	March 3, 1943	Turku	Y. Väisälä	·	5.9 km (3.7 mi)	MPC · JPL
5074 Goetzoertel	1949 QQ_{1}	Goetzoertel	August 24, 1949	Brooklyn	Indiana University	EOS	13 km (8.1 mi)	MPC · JPL
5075 Goryachev	1969 TN_{4}	Goryachev	October 13, 1969	Nauchnij	B. A. Burnasheva	NYS · slow	4.8 km (3.0 mi)	MPC · JPL
5076 Lebedev-Kumach	1973 SG_{4}	Lebedev-Kumach	September 26, 1973	Nauchnij	L. I. Chernykh	·	4.7 km (2.9 mi)	MPC · JPL
5077 Favaloro	1974 MG	Favaloro	June 17, 1974	El Leoncito	Félix Aguilar Observatory	·	4.5 km (2.8 mi)	MPC · JPL
5078 Solovjev-Sedoj	1974 SW	Solovjev-Sedoj	September 19, 1974	Nauchnij	L. I. Chernykh	·	7.9 km (4.9 mi)	MPC · JPL
5079 Brubeck	1975 DB	Brubeck	February 16, 1975	El Leoncito	Félix Aguilar Observatory	·	16 km (9.9 mi)	MPC · JPL
5080 Oja	1976 EB	Oja	March 2, 1976	Kvistaberg	C.-I. Lagerkvist	(883)	7.8 km (4.8 mi)	MPC · JPL
5081 Sanguin	1976 WC_{1}	Sanguin	November 18, 1976	El Leoncito	Félix Aguilar Observatory	PHO	17 km (11 mi)	MPC · JPL
5082 Nihonsyoki	1977 DN_{4}	Nihonsyoki	February 18, 1977	Kiso	H. Kosai, K. Furukawa	THM	13 km (8.1 mi)	MPC · JPL
5083 Irinara	1977 EV	Irinara	March 13, 1977	Nauchnij	N. S. Chernykh	·	8.2 km (5.1 mi)	MPC · JPL
5084 Gnedin	1977 FN_{1}	Gnedin	March 26, 1977	Nauchnij	N. S. Chernykh	(1298)	18 km (11 mi)	MPC · JPL
5085 Hippocrene	1977 NN	Hippocrene	July 14, 1977	Nauchnij	N. S. Chernykh	·	4.0 km (2.5 mi)	MPC · JPL
5086 Demin	1978 RH_{1}	Demin	September 5, 1978	Nauchnij	N. S. Chernykh	·	4.2 km (2.6 mi)	MPC · JPL
5087 Emelʹyanov	1978 RM_{2}	Emelʹyanov	September 12, 1978	Nauchnij	N. S. Chernykh	PAD	13 km (8.1 mi)	MPC · JPL
5088 Tancredi	1979 QZ_{1}	Tancredi	August 22, 1979	La Silla	C.-I. Lagerkvist	THM	16 km (9.9 mi)	MPC · JPL
5089 Nádherná	1979 SN	Nádherná	September 25, 1979	Kleť	A. Mrkos	·	8.9 km (5.5 mi)	MPC · JPL
5090 Wyeth	1980 CG	Wyeth	February 9, 1980	Harvard Observatory	Harvard Observatory	·	7.3 km (4.5 mi)	MPC · JPL
5091 Isakovskij	1981 SD_{4}	Isakovskij	September 25, 1981	Nauchnij	L. I. Chernykh	HOF	14 km (8.7 mi)	MPC · JPL
5092 Manara	1982 FJ	Manara	March 21, 1982	Anderson Mesa	E. Bowell	URS	25 km (16 mi)	MPC · JPL
5093 Svirelia	1982 TG_{1}	Svirelia	October 14, 1982	Nauchnij	L. G. Karachkina	EUN	7.9 km (4.9 mi)	MPC · JPL
5094 Seryozha	1982 UT_{6}	Seryozha	October 20, 1982	Nauchnij	L. G. Karachkina	KOR	7.7 km (4.8 mi)	MPC · JPL
5095 Escalante	1983 NL	Escalante	July 10, 1983	Anderson Mesa	E. Bowell	PHO	6.4 km (4.0 mi)	MPC · JPL
5096 Luzin	1983 RC_{5}	Luzin	September 5, 1983	Nauchnij	L. V. Zhuravleva	·	6.9 km (4.3 mi)	MPC · JPL
5097 Axford	1983 TW_{1}	Axford	October 12, 1983	Anderson Mesa	E. Bowell	·	13 km (8.1 mi)	MPC · JPL
5098 Tomsolomon	1985 CH_{2}	Tomsolomon	February 14, 1985	La Silla	H. Debehogne	·	5.6 km (3.5 mi)	MPC · JPL
5099 Iainbanks	1985 DY_{1}	Iainbanks	February 16, 1985	La Silla	H. Debehogne	·	6.2 km (3.9 mi)	MPC · JPL
5100 Pasachoff	1985 GW	Pasachoff	April 15, 1985	Anderson Mesa	E. Bowell	·	11 km (6.8 mi)	MPC · JPL

== 5101–5200 ==
back to top

Designation			Discovery			Properties		Ref
Permanent	Provisional	Named after	Date	Site	Discoverer(s)	Category	Diam.	Ref
5101 Akhmerov	1985 UB_{5}	Akhmerov	October 22, 1985	Nauchnij	L. V. Zhuravleva	EOS	11 km (6.8 mi)	MPC · JPL
5102 Benfranklin	1986 RD_{1}	Benfranklin	September 2, 1986	Kleť	A. Mrkos	·	17 km (11 mi)	MPC · JPL
5103 Diviš	1986 RP_{1}	Diviš	September 4, 1986	Kleť	A. Mrkos	PAD	12 km (7.5 mi)	MPC · JPL
5104 Skripnichenko	1986 RU_{5}	Skripnichenko	September 7, 1986	Nauchnij	L. I. Chernykh	·	9.7 km (6.0 mi)	MPC · JPL
5105 Westerhout	1986 TM_{1}	Westerhout	October 4, 1986	Anderson Mesa	E. Bowell	·	10 km (6.2 mi)	MPC · JPL
5106 Mortensen	1987 DJ	Mortensen	February 19, 1987	Brorfelde	P. Jensen	EOS	14 km (8.7 mi)	MPC · JPL
5107 Laurenbacall	1987 DS_{6}	Laurenbacall	February 24, 1987	La Silla	H. Debehogne	·	17 km (11 mi)	MPC · JPL
5108 Lübeck	1987 QG_{2}	Lübeck	August 21, 1987	La Silla	E. W. Elst	V	4.6 km (2.9 mi)	MPC · JPL
5109 Robertmiller	1987 RM_{1}	Robertmiller	September 13, 1987	La Silla	H. Debehogne	·	4.7 km (2.9 mi)	MPC · JPL
5110 Belgirate	1987 SV	Belgirate	September 19, 1987	Anderson Mesa	E. Bowell	·	10 km (6.2 mi)	MPC · JPL
5111 Jacliff	1987 SE_{4}	Jacliff	September 29, 1987	Anderson Mesa	E. Bowell	V	6.4 km (4.0 mi)	MPC · JPL
5112 Kusaji	1987 SM_{13}	Kusaji	September 23, 1987	Kushiro	S. Ueda, H. Kaneda	moon	3.4 km (2.1 mi)	MPC · JPL
5113 Kohno	1988 BN	Kohno	January 19, 1988	Geisei	T. Seki	·	7.4 km (4.6 mi)	MPC · JPL
5114 Yezo	1988 CO	Yezo	February 15, 1988	Kushiro	S. Ueda, H. Kaneda	·	8.5 km (5.3 mi)	MPC · JPL
5115 Frimout	1988 CD_{4}	Frimout	February 13, 1988	La Silla	E. W. Elst	EOS	14 km (8.7 mi)	MPC · JPL
5116 Korsør	1988 EU	Korsør	March 13, 1988	Brorfelde	P. Jensen	HYG	19 km (12 mi)	MPC · JPL
5117 Mokotoyama	1988 GH	Mokotoyama	April 8, 1988	Kitami	K. Endate, K. Watanabe	·	20 km (12 mi)	MPC · JPL
5118 Elnapoul	1988 RB	Elnapoul	September 7, 1988	Brorfelde	P. Jensen	·	10 km (6.2 mi)	MPC · JPL
5119 Imbrius	1988 RA_{1}	Imbrius	September 8, 1988	Brorfelde	P. Jensen	L5	49 km (30 mi)	MPC · JPL
5120 Bitias	1988 TZ_{1}	Bitias	October 13, 1988	Palomar	C. S. Shoemaker	L5	48 km (30 mi)	MPC · JPL
5121 Numazawa	1989 AX_{1}	Numazawa	January 15, 1989	Kitami	M. Yanai, K. Watanabe	·	7.2 km (4.5 mi)	MPC · JPL
5122 Mucha	1989 AZ_{1}	Mucha	January 3, 1989	Kleť	A. Mrkos	·	9.2 km (5.7 mi)	MPC · JPL
5123 Cynus	1989 BL	Cynus	January 28, 1989	Gekko	Y. Oshima	L4	35 km (22 mi)	MPC · JPL
5124 Muraoka	1989 CW	Muraoka	February 4, 1989	Geisei	T. Seki	·	4.1 km (2.5 mi)	MPC · JPL
5125 Okushiri	1989 CN_{1}	Okushiri	February 10, 1989	Kushiro	S. Ueda, H. Kaneda	·	5.6 km (3.5 mi)	MPC · JPL
5126 Achaemenides	1989 CH_{2}	Achaemenides	February 1, 1989	Palomar	C. S. Shoemaker	L4	52 km (32 mi)	MPC · JPL
5127 Bruhns	1989 CO_{3}	Bruhns	February 4, 1989	La Silla	E. W. Elst	·	5.7 km (3.5 mi)	MPC · JPL
5128 Wakabayashi	1989 FJ	Wakabayashi	March 30, 1989	Ayashi Station	M. Koishikawa	·	18 km (11 mi)	MPC · JPL
5129 Groom	1989 GN	Groom	April 7, 1989	Palomar	E. F. Helin	·	7.5 km (4.7 mi)	MPC · JPL
5130 Ilioneus	1989 SC_{7}	Ilioneus	September 30, 1989	Palomar	C. S. Shoemaker	L5	61 km (38 mi)	MPC · JPL
5131	1990 BG	—	January 21, 1990	Palomar	E. F. Helin, B. Roman	APO +1 km (0.62 mi)	3.9 km (2.4 mi)	MPC · JPL
5132 Maynard	1990 ME	Maynard	June 22, 1990	Palomar	H. E. Holt	·	11 km (6.8 mi)	MPC · JPL
5133 Phillipadams	1990 PA	Phillipadams	August 12, 1990	Siding Spring	R. H. McNaught	·	23 km (14 mi)	MPC · JPL
5134 Ebilson	1990 SM_{2}	Ebilson	September 17, 1990	Palomar	H. E. Holt	·	11 km (6.8 mi)	MPC · JPL
5135 Nibutani	1990 UE	Nibutani	October 16, 1990	Kushiro	S. Ueda, H. Kaneda	moon	4.8 km (3.0 mi)	MPC · JPL
5136 Baggaley	1990 UG_{2}	Baggaley	October 20, 1990	Siding Spring	R. H. McNaught	EOS	13 km (8.1 mi)	MPC · JPL
5137 Frevert	1990 VC	Frevert	November 8, 1990	Chions	J. M. Baur	MAR	6.7 km (4.2 mi)	MPC · JPL
5138 Gyoda	1990 VD_{2}	Gyoda	November 13, 1990	Okutama	Hioki, T., Hayakawa, S.	THM ·	15 km (9.3 mi)	MPC · JPL
5139 Rumoi	1990 VH_{4}	Rumoi	November 13, 1990	Kagoshima	M. Mukai, Takeishi, M.	KOR	12 km (7.5 mi)	MPC · JPL
5140 Kida	1990 XH	Kida	December 8, 1990	Kushiro	S. Ueda, H. Kaneda	slow	19 km (12 mi)	MPC · JPL
5141 Tachibana	1990 YB	Tachibana	December 16, 1990	Geisei	T. Seki	KOR	8.7 km (5.4 mi)	MPC · JPL
5142 Okutama	1990 YD	Okutama	December 18, 1990	Okutama	Hioki, T., Hayakawa, S.	·	6.2 km (3.9 mi)	MPC · JPL
5143 Heracles	1991 VL	Heracles	November 7, 1991	Palomar	C. S. Shoemaker	APO +1 km (0.62 mi) · moon	4.8 km (3.0 mi)	MPC · JPL
5144 Achates	1991 XX	Achates	December 2, 1991	Palomar	C. S. Shoemaker	L5	81 km (50 mi)	MPC · JPL
5145 Pholus	1992 AD	Pholus	January 9, 1992	Kitt Peak	Spacewatch	centaur	190 km (120 mi)	MPC · JPL
5146 Moiwa	1992 BP	Moiwa	January 28, 1992	Kushiro	S. Ueda, H. Kaneda	·	13 km (8.1 mi)	MPC · JPL
5147 Maruyama	1992 BQ	Maruyama	January 28, 1992	Kushiro	S. Ueda, H. Kaneda	·	7.7 km (4.8 mi)	MPC · JPL
5148 Giordano	5557 P-L	Giordano	October 17, 1960	Palomar	C. J. van Houten, I. van Houten-Groeneveld, T. Gehrels	·	8.1 km (5.0 mi)	MPC · JPL
5149 Leibniz	6582 P-L	Leibniz	September 24, 1960	Palomar	C. J. van Houten, I. van Houten-Groeneveld, T. Gehrels	THM	10 km (6.2 mi)	MPC · JPL
5150 Fellini	7571 P-L	Fellini	October 17, 1960	Palomar	C. J. van Houten, I. van Houten-Groeneveld, T. Gehrels	·	5.4 km (3.4 mi)	MPC · JPL
5151 Weerstra	2160 T-2	Weerstra	September 29, 1973	Palomar	C. J. van Houten, I. van Houten-Groeneveld, T. Gehrels	THM	11 km (6.8 mi)	MPC · JPL
5152 Labs	1931 UD	Labs	October 18, 1931	Heidelberg	K. Reinmuth	EUN	6.7 km (4.2 mi)	MPC · JPL
5153 Gierasch	1940 GO	Gierasch	April 9, 1940	Turku	Y. Väisälä	·	27 km (17 mi)	MPC · JPL
5154 Leonov	1969 TL_{1}	Leonov	October 8, 1969	Nauchnij	L. I. Chernykh	·	14 km (8.7 mi)	MPC · JPL
5155 Denisyuk	1972 HR	Denisyuk	April 18, 1972	Nauchnij	T. M. Smirnova	HYG	15 km (9.3 mi)	MPC · JPL
5156 Golant	1972 KL	Golant	May 18, 1972	Nauchnij	T. M. Smirnova	·	6.8 km (4.2 mi)	MPC · JPL
5157 Hindemith	1973 UB_{5}	Hindemith	October 27, 1973	Tautenburg Observatory	F. Börngen	THM	14 km (8.7 mi)	MPC · JPL
5158 Ogarev	1976 YY	Ogarev	December 16, 1976	Nauchnij	L. I. Chernykh	NYS ·	8.0 km (5.0 mi)	MPC · JPL
5159 Burbine	1977 RG	Burbine	September 9, 1977	Harvard Observatory	Harvard Observatory	GEF	6.4 km (4.0 mi)	MPC · JPL
5160 Camoes	1979 YO	Camoes	December 23, 1979	La Silla	H. Debehogne, Netto, E. R.	·	6.0 km (3.7 mi)	MPC · JPL
5161 Wightman	1980 TX_{3}	Wightman	October 9, 1980	Palomar	C. S. Shoemaker	KOR	8.4 km (5.2 mi)	MPC · JPL
5162 Piemonte	1982 BW	Piemonte	January 18, 1982	Anderson Mesa	E. Bowell	EOS	17 km (11 mi)	MPC · JPL
5163 Vollmayr-Lee	1983 TD_{2}	Vollmayr-Lee	October 9, 1983	Anderson Mesa	Wagner, J.	·	6.9 km (4.3 mi)	MPC · JPL
5164 Mullo	1984 WE_{1}	Mullo	November 20, 1984	Caussols	C. Pollas	T_{j} (2.79) · CYB	10 km (6.2 mi)	MPC · JPL
5165 Videnom	1985 CG	Videnom	February 11, 1985	Brorfelde	P. Jensen	NYS	4.2 km (2.6 mi)	MPC · JPL
5166 Olson	1985 FU_{1}	Olson	March 22, 1985	Anderson Mesa	E. Bowell	·	11 km (6.8 mi)	MPC · JPL
5167 Joeharms	1985 GU_{1}	Joeharms	April 11, 1985	Palomar	C. S. Shoemaker, E. M. Shoemaker	·	17 km (11 mi)	MPC · JPL
5168 Jenner	1986 EJ	Jenner	March 6, 1986	Palomar	C. S. Shoemaker, E. M. Shoemaker	PHO	6.0 km (3.7 mi)	MPC · JPL
5169 Duffell	1986 RU_{2}	Duffell	September 6, 1986	Anderson Mesa	E. Bowell	·	4.4 km (2.7 mi)	MPC · JPL
5170 Sissons	1987 EH	Sissons	March 3, 1987	Anderson Mesa	E. Bowell	EOS	11 km (6.8 mi)	MPC · JPL
5171 Augustesen	1987 SQ_{3}	Augustesen	September 25, 1987	Brorfelde	P. Jensen	slow	6.4 km (4.0 mi)	MPC · JPL
5172 Yoshiyuki	1987 UX_{1}	Yoshiyuki	October 28, 1987	Kushiro	S. Ueda, H. Kaneda	·	3.5 km (2.2 mi)	MPC · JPL
5173 Stjerneborg	1988 EM_{1}	Stjerneborg	March 13, 1988	Brorfelde	P. Jensen	·	6.0 km (3.7 mi)	MPC · JPL
5174 Okugi	1988 HF	Okugi	April 16, 1988	Kitami	M. Yanai, K. Watanabe	RAF	5.7 km (3.5 mi)	MPC · JPL
5175 Ables	1988 VS_{4}	Ables	November 4, 1988	Palomar	C. S. Shoemaker, E. M. Shoemaker	H	4.3 km (2.7 mi)	MPC · JPL
5176 Yoichi	1989 AU	Yoichi	January 4, 1989	Kushiro	S. Ueda, H. Kaneda	·	17 km (11 mi)	MPC · JPL
5177 Hugowolf	1989 AY_{6}	Hugowolf	January 10, 1989	Tautenburg Observatory	F. Börngen	·	8.9 km (5.5 mi)	MPC · JPL
5178 Pattazhy	1989 CD_{4}	Pattazhy	February 1, 1989	Kavalur	Rajamohan, R.	·	4.3 km (2.7 mi)	MPC · JPL
5179 Takeshima	1989 EO_{1}	Takeshima	March 1, 1989	Geisei	T. Seki	V · slow	4.3 km (2.7 mi)	MPC · JPL
5180 Ohno	1989 GF	Ohno	April 6, 1989	Kitami	T. Fujii, K. Watanabe	·	5.3 km (3.3 mi)	MPC · JPL
5181 SURF	1989 GO	SURF	April 7, 1989	Palomar	E. F. Helin	NYS	6.2 km (3.9 mi)	MPC · JPL
5182 Bray	1989 NE	Bray	July 1, 1989	Palomar	E. F. Helin	·	9.3 km (5.8 mi)	MPC · JPL
5183 Robyn	1990 OA_{1}	Robyn	July 22, 1990	Palomar	E. F. Helin	MAR	9.0 km (5.6 mi)	MPC · JPL
5184 Cavaillé-Coll	1990 QY_{7}	Cavaillé-Coll	August 16, 1990	La Silla	E. W. Elst	·	4.1 km (2.5 mi)	MPC · JPL
5185 Alerossi	1990 RV_{2}	Alerossi	September 15, 1990	Palomar	H. E. Holt	·	14 km (8.7 mi)	MPC · JPL
5186 Donalu	1990 SB_{4}	Donalu	September 22, 1990	Palomar	B. Roman	·	11 km (6.8 mi)	MPC · JPL
5187 Domon	1990 TK_{1}	Domon	October 15, 1990	Kitami	K. Endate, K. Watanabe	KOR	8.9 km (5.5 mi)	MPC · JPL
5188 Paine	1990 TZ_{2}	Paine	October 15, 1990	Palomar	E. F. Helin	EUN	6.5 km (4.0 mi)	MPC · JPL
5189	1990 UQ	—	October 20, 1990	Siding Spring	R. H. McNaught	APO +1 km (0.62 mi) · PHA	960 m (3,150 ft)	MPC · JPL
5190 Fry	1990 UR_{2}	Fry	October 16, 1990	Kushiro	S. Ueda, H. Kaneda	·	15 km (9.3 mi)	MPC · JPL
5191 Paddack	1990 VO_{3}	Paddack	November 13, 1990	Kushiro	S. Ueda, H. Kaneda	EOS	14 km (8.7 mi)	MPC · JPL
5192 Yabuki	1991 CC	Yabuki	February 4, 1991	Kitami	T. Fujii, K. Watanabe	·	32 km (20 mi)	MPC · JPL
5193 Tanakawataru	1992 ET	Tanakawataru	March 7, 1992	Kushiro	S. Ueda, H. Kaneda	THM	22 km (14 mi)	MPC · JPL
5194 Böttger	4641 P-L	Böttger	September 24, 1960	Palomar	C. J. van Houten, I. van Houten-Groeneveld, T. Gehrels	·	6.2 km (3.9 mi)	MPC · JPL
5195 Kaendler	3289 T-1	Kaendler	March 26, 1971	Palomar	C. J. van Houten, I. van Houten-Groeneveld, T. Gehrels	·	4.3 km (2.7 mi)	MPC · JPL
5196 Bustelli	3102 T-2	Bustelli	September 30, 1973	Palomar	C. J. van Houten, I. van Houten-Groeneveld, T. Gehrels	EUN	5.9 km (3.7 mi)	MPC · JPL
5197 Rottmann	4265 T-2	Rottmann	September 29, 1973	Palomar	C. J. van Houten, I. van Houten-Groeneveld, T. Gehrels	EOS	11 km (6.8 mi)	MPC · JPL
5198 Fongyunwah	1975 BP_{1}	Fongyunwah	January 16, 1975	Nanking	Purple Mountain	THM	17 km (11 mi)	MPC · JPL
5199 Dortmund	1981 RP_{2}	Dortmund	September 7, 1981	Nauchnij	L. G. Karachkina	·	8.8 km (5.5 mi)	MPC · JPL
5200 Pamal	1983 CM	Pamal	February 11, 1983	Anderson Mesa	E. Bowell	·	3.9 km (2.4 mi)	MPC · JPL

== 5201–5300 ==
back to top

Designation			Discovery			Properties		Ref
Permanent	Provisional	Named after	Date	Site	Discoverer(s)	Category	Diam.	Ref
5201 Ferraz-Mello	1983 XF	Ferraz-Mello	December 1, 1983	Anderson Mesa	E. Bowell	T_{j} (2.97) · CYB · 2:1J (unstable)	6.1 km (3.8 mi)	MPC · JPL
5202 Charleseliot	1983 XX	Charleseliot	December 5, 1983	Kleť	A. Mrkos	PHO · slow	9.2 km (5.7 mi)	MPC · JPL
5203 Pavarotti	1984 SF_{1}	Pavarotti	September 27, 1984	Kleť	Z. Vávrová	·	5.0 km (3.1 mi)	MPC · JPL
5204 Herakleitos	1988 CN_{2}	Herakleitos	February 11, 1988	La Silla	E. W. Elst	THM ·	13 km (8.1 mi)	MPC · JPL
5205 Servián	1988 CU_{7}	Servián	February 11, 1988	Kushiro	S. Ueda, H. Kaneda	·	5.0 km (3.1 mi)	MPC · JPL
5206 Kodomonomori	1988 ED	Kodomonomori	March 7, 1988	Gekko	Y. Oshima	EUN	7.5 km (4.7 mi)	MPC · JPL
5207 Hearnshaw	1988 HE	Hearnshaw	April 15, 1988	Lake Tekapo	A. C. Gilmore, P. M. Kilmartin	EUN	5.9 km (3.7 mi)	MPC · JPL
5208 Royer	1989 CH_{1}	Royer	February 6, 1989	Palomar	E. F. Helin	MAR	8.1 km (5.0 mi)	MPC · JPL
5209 Oloosson	1989 CW_{1}	Oloosson	February 13, 1989	Geisei	T. Seki	L4	48 km (30 mi)	MPC · JPL
5210 Saint-Saëns	1989 EL_{6}	Saint-Saëns	March 7, 1989	Tautenburg Observatory	F. Börngen	NYS ·	8.5 km (5.3 mi)	MPC · JPL
5211 Stevenson	1989 NX	Stevenson	July 8, 1989	Palomar	C. S. Shoemaker, E. M. Shoemaker	PHO	5.5 km (3.4 mi)	MPC · JPL
5212 Celiacruz	1989 SS	Celiacruz	September 29, 1989	Kushiro	S. Ueda, H. Kaneda	·	13 km (8.1 mi)	MPC · JPL
5213 Takahashi	1990 FU	Takahashi	March 18, 1990	Kitami	K. Endate, K. Watanabe	EOS	14 km (8.7 mi)	MPC · JPL
5214 Oozora	1990 VN_{3}	Oozora	November 13, 1990	Kitami	A. Takahashi, K. Watanabe	·	4.9 km (3.0 mi)	MPC · JPL
5215 Tsurui	1991 AE	Tsurui	January 9, 1991	Kushiro	Matsuyama, M., K. Watanabe	EUN	12 km (7.5 mi)	MPC · JPL
5216 Cannizzo	1941 HA	Cannizzo	April 16, 1941	Turku	L. Oterma	EUN	11 km (6.8 mi)	MPC · JPL
5217 Chaozhou	1966 CL	Chaozhou	February 13, 1966	Nanking	Purple Mountain	NYS	7.2 km (4.5 mi)	MPC · JPL
5218 Kutsak	1969 TB_{3}	Kutsak	October 9, 1969	Nauchnij	B. A. Burnasheva	·	9.3 km (5.8 mi)	MPC · JPL
5219 Zemka	1976 GU_{3}	Zemka	April 2, 1976	Nauchnij	N. S. Chernykh	THM	17 km (11 mi)	MPC · JPL
5220 Vika	1979 SA_{8}	Vika	September 23, 1979	Nauchnij	N. S. Chernykh	·	5.1 km (3.2 mi)	MPC · JPL
5221 Fabribudweis	1980 FB	Fabribudweis	March 16, 1980	Kleť	L. Brožek	THM	14 km (8.7 mi)	MPC · JPL
5222 Ioffe	1980 TL_{13}	Ioffe	October 11, 1980	Nauchnij	N. S. Chernykh	PAL	18 km (11 mi)	MPC · JPL
5223 McSween	1981 EX_{6}	McSween	March 6, 1981	Siding Spring	S. J. Bus	·	13 km (8.1 mi)	MPC · JPL
5224 Abbe	1982 DX_{3}	Abbe	February 21, 1982	Tautenburg Observatory	F. Börngen	·	4.9 km (3.0 mi)	MPC · JPL
5225 Loral	1983 TS_{1}	Loral	October 12, 1983	Anderson Mesa	E. Bowell	THM	15 km (9.3 mi)	MPC · JPL
5226 Pollack	1983 WL	Pollack	November 28, 1983	Anderson Mesa	E. Bowell	·	5.5 km (3.4 mi)	MPC · JPL
5227 Bocacara	1986 PE	Bocacara	August 4, 1986	Palomar	INAS	·	5.2 km (3.2 mi)	MPC · JPL
5228 Máca	1986 VT	Máca	November 3, 1986	Kleť	Z. Vávrová	THM	14 km (8.7 mi)	MPC · JPL
5229 Irurita	1987 DE_{6}	Irurita	February 23, 1987	La Silla	H. Debehogne	·	18 km (11 mi)	MPC · JPL
5230 Asahina	1988 EF	Asahina	March 10, 1988	Palomar	J. Alu	·	5.7 km (3.5 mi)	MPC · JPL
5231 Verne	1988 JV	Verne	May 9, 1988	Palomar	C. S. Shoemaker	EUN	11 km (6.8 mi)	MPC · JPL
5232 Jordaens	1988 PR_{1}	Jordaens	August 14, 1988	Haute-Provence	E. W. Elst	moon	12 km (7.5 mi)	MPC · JPL
5233 Nastes	1988 RL_{10}	Nastes	September 14, 1988	Cerro Tololo	S. J. Bus	L5	29 km (18 mi)	MPC · JPL
5234 Sechenov	1989 VP	Sechenov	November 4, 1989	Nauchnij	L. G. Karachkina	PAL	14 km (8.7 mi)	MPC · JPL
5235 Jean-Loup	1990 SA_{1}	Jean-Loup	September 16, 1990	Palomar	H. E. Holt	·	6.7 km (4.2 mi)	MPC · JPL
5236 Yoko	1990 TG_{3}	Yoko	October 10, 1990	Kani	Y. Mizuno, T. Furuta	·	8.3 km (5.2 mi)	MPC · JPL
5237 Yoshikawa	1990 UF_{3}	Yoshikawa	October 26, 1990	Oohira	T. Urata	·	14 km (8.7 mi)	MPC · JPL
5238 Naozane	1990 VE_{2}	Naozane	November 13, 1990	Okutama	Hioki, T., Hayakawa, S.	BAP	5.9 km (3.7 mi)	MPC · JPL
5239 Reiki	1990 VC_{4}	Reiki	November 14, 1990	Yatsugatake	S. Izumikawa, O. Muramatsu	·	10 km (6.2 mi)	MPC · JPL
5240 Kwasan	1990 XE	Kwasan	December 7, 1990	Toyota	K. Suzuki, T. Urata	V	7.0 km (4.3 mi)	MPC · JPL
5241 Beeson	1990 YL	Beeson	December 23, 1990	Kushiro	S. Ueda, H. Kaneda	·	16 km (9.9 mi)	MPC · JPL
5242 Kenreimonin	1991 BO	Kenreimonin	January 18, 1991	Karasuyama	S. Inoda, T. Urata	AGN	7.5 km (4.7 mi)	MPC · JPL
5243 Clasien	1246 T-2	Clasien	September 29, 1973	Palomar	C. J. van Houten, I. van Houten-Groeneveld, T. Gehrels	DOR	14 km (8.7 mi)	MPC · JPL
5244 Amphilochos	1973 SQ_{1}	Amphilochos	September 29, 1973	Palomar	C. J. van Houten, I. van Houten-Groeneveld, T. Gehrels	L4	37 km (23 mi)	MPC · JPL
5245 Maslyakov	1976 GR_{2}	Maslyakov	April 1, 1976	Nauchnij	N. S. Chernykh	·	4.0 km (2.5 mi)	MPC · JPL
5246 Migliorini	1979 OB	Migliorini	July 26, 1979	Anderson Mesa	E. Bowell	·	3.7 km (2.3 mi)	MPC · JPL
5247 Krylov	1982 UP_{6}	Krylov	October 20, 1982	Nauchnij	L. G. Karachkina	PHO	7.7 km (4.8 mi)	MPC · JPL
5248 Scardia	1983 GQ	Scardia	April 6, 1983	La Silla	H. Debehogne, G. de Sanctis	·	4.2 km (2.6 mi)	MPC · JPL
5249 Giza	1983 HJ	Giza	April 18, 1983	Anderson Mesa	N. G. Thomas	THM	21 km (13 mi)	MPC · JPL
5250 Jas	1984 QF	Jas	August 21, 1984	Kleť	A. Mrkos	EUN	7.1 km (4.4 mi)	MPC · JPL
5251 Bradwood	1985 KA	Bradwood	May 18, 1985	Lake Tekapo	A. C. Gilmore, P. M. Kilmartin	PHO	4.6 km (2.9 mi)	MPC · JPL
5252 Vikrymov	1985 PZ_{1}	Vikrymov	August 13, 1985	Nauchnij	N. S. Chernykh	·	3.1 km (1.9 mi)	MPC · JPL
5253 Fredclifford	1985 XB	Fredclifford	December 15, 1985	Palomar	S. Singer-Brewster	H	2.4 km (1.5 mi)	MPC · JPL
5254 Ulysses	1986 VG_{1}	Ulysses	November 7, 1986	Haute-Provence	E. W. Elst	L4	76 km (47 mi)	MPC · JPL
5255 Johnsophie	1988 KF	Johnsophie	May 19, 1988	Palomar	E. F. Helin	·	14 km (8.7 mi)	MPC · JPL
5256 Farquhar	1988 NN	Farquhar	July 11, 1988	Palomar	E. F. Helin, Mikolajczak, C., Coker, R.	·	12 km (7.5 mi)	MPC · JPL
5257 Laogonus	1988 RS_{10}	Laogonus	September 14, 1988	Cerro Tololo	S. J. Bus	L5	20 km (12 mi)	MPC · JPL
5258 Rhoeo	1989 AU_{1}	Rhoeo	January 1, 1989	Gekko	Y. Oshima	L4	53 km (33 mi)	MPC · JPL
5259 Epeigeus	1989 BB_{1}	Epeigeus	January 30, 1989	Palomar	C. S. Shoemaker, E. M. Shoemaker	L4	45 km (28 mi)	MPC · JPL
5260 Philvéron	1989 RH	Philvéron	September 2, 1989	Haute-Provence	E. W. Elst	EUN	6.5 km (4.0 mi)	MPC · JPL
5261 Eureka	1990 MB	Eureka	June 20, 1990	Palomar	D. H. Levy, H. E. Holt	moon	1.9 km (1.2 mi)	MPC · JPL
5262 Brucegoldberg	1990 XB_{1}	Brucegoldberg	December 14, 1990	Palomar	E. F. Helin	·	33 km (21 mi)	MPC · JPL
5263 Arrius	1991 GY_{9}	Arrius	April 13, 1991	Siding Spring	D. I. Steel	·	26 km (16 mi)	MPC · JPL
5264 Telephus	1991 KC	Telephus	May 17, 1991	Palomar	C. S. Shoemaker, E. M. Shoemaker	L4	68 km (42 mi)	MPC · JPL
5265 Schadow	2570 P-L	Schadow	September 24, 1960	Palomar	C. J. van Houten, I. van Houten-Groeneveld, T. Gehrels	HYG	10 km (6.2 mi)	MPC · JPL
5266 Rauch	4047 T-2	Rauch	September 29, 1973	Palomar	C. J. van Houten, I. van Houten-Groeneveld, T. Gehrels	·	11 km (6.8 mi)	MPC · JPL
5267 Zegmott	1966 CF	Zegmott	February 13, 1966	Nanking	Purple Mountain	·	4.6 km (2.9 mi)	MPC · JPL
5268 Černohorský	1971 US_{1}	Černohorský	October 26, 1971	Hamburg-Bergedorf	L. Kohoutek	·	8.8 km (5.5 mi)	MPC · JPL
5269 Paustovskij	1978 SL_{6}	Paustovskij	September 28, 1978	Nauchnij	N. S. Chernykh	·	3.4 km (2.1 mi)	MPC · JPL
5270 Kakabadze	1979 KR	Kakabadze	May 19, 1979	La Silla	R. M. West	·	9.9 km (6.2 mi)	MPC · JPL
5271 Kaylamaya	1979 MH_{7}	Kaylamaya	June 25, 1979	Siding Spring	E. F. Helin, S. J. Bus	EUN	4.7 km (2.9 mi)	MPC · JPL
5272 Dickinson	1981 QH_{2}	Dickinson	August 30, 1981	Anderson Mesa	E. Bowell	·	3.3 km (2.1 mi)	MPC · JPL
5273 Peilisheng	1982 DQ_{6}	Peilisheng	February 16, 1982	Xinglong	Purple Mountain	·	4.5 km (2.8 mi)	MPC · JPL
5274 Degewij	1985 RS	Degewij	September 14, 1985	Anderson Mesa	E. Bowell	ADE	16 km (9.9 mi)	MPC · JPL
5275 Zdislava	1986 UU	Zdislava	October 28, 1986	Kleť	Z. Vávrová	·	4.6 km (2.9 mi)	MPC · JPL
5276 Gulkis	1987 GK	Gulkis	April 1, 1987	Palomar	E. F. Helin	·	9.8 km (6.1 mi)	MPC · JPL
5277 Brisbane	1988 DO	Brisbane	February 22, 1988	Siding Spring	R. H. McNaught	·	3.0 km (1.9 mi)	MPC · JPL
5278 Polly	1988 EJ_{1}	Polly	March 12, 1988	Palomar	E. F. Helin	·	4.4 km (2.7 mi)	MPC · JPL
5279 Arthuradel	1988 LA	Arthuradel	June 8, 1988	Palomar	Rodriquez, T.	·	7.6 km (4.7 mi)	MPC · JPL
5280 Andrewbecker	1988 PT	Andrewbecker	August 11, 1988	Palomar	Mikolajczak, C., Coker, R.	·	11 km (6.8 mi)	MPC · JPL
5281 Lindstrom	1988 SO_{1}	Lindstrom	September 6, 1988	Cerro Tololo	S. J. Bus	EOS	17 km (11 mi)	MPC · JPL
5282 Yamatotakeru	1988 VT	Yamatotakeru	November 2, 1988	Gekko	Y. Oshima	·	5.9 km (3.7 mi)	MPC · JPL
5283 Pyrrhus	1989 BW	Pyrrhus	January 31, 1989	Palomar	C. S. Shoemaker	L4	48 km (30 mi)	MPC · JPL
5284 Orsilocus	1989 CK_{2}	Orsilocus	February 1, 1989	Palomar	C. S. Shoemaker, E. M. Shoemaker	L4	50 km (31 mi)	MPC · JPL
5285 Krethon	1989 EO_{11}	Krethon	March 9, 1989	Palomar	C. S. Shoemaker, E. M. Shoemaker	L4	50 km (31 mi)	MPC · JPL
5286 Haruomukai	1989 VT_{1}	Haruomukai	November 4, 1989	Kagoshima	M. Mukai, Takeishi, M.	KOR	9.1 km (5.7 mi)	MPC · JPL
5287 Heishu	1989 WE	Heishu	November 20, 1989	Kani	Y. Mizuno, T. Furuta	·	8.2 km (5.1 mi)	MPC · JPL
5288 Nankichi	1989 XD	Nankichi	December 3, 1989	Kani	Y. Mizuno, T. Furuta	EUN	8.7 km (5.4 mi)	MPC · JPL
5289 Niemelä	1990 KG_{2}	Niemelä	May 28, 1990	El Leoncito	Félix Aguilar Observatory	EOS	9.9 km (6.2 mi)	MPC · JPL
5290 Langevin	1990 OD_{4}	Langevin	July 30, 1990	Palomar	H. E. Holt	·	18 km (11 mi)	MPC · JPL
5291 Yuuko	1990 YT	Yuuko	December 20, 1990	Kushiro	Matsuyama, M., K. Watanabe	NYS	5.3 km (3.3 mi)	MPC · JPL
5292 Mackwell	1991 AJ_{1}	Mackwell	January 12, 1991	Fujieda	Shiozawa, H., M. Kizawa	MAR	9.4 km (5.8 mi)	MPC · JPL
5293 Bentengahama	1991 BQ_{2}	Bentengahama	January 23, 1991	Kushiro	Matsuyama, M., K. Watanabe	EUN	12 km (7.5 mi)	MPC · JPL
5294 Onnetoh	1991 CB	Onnetoh	February 3, 1991	Kitami	K. Endate, K. Watanabe	·	13 km (8.1 mi)	MPC · JPL
5295 Masayo	1991 CE	Masayo	February 5, 1991	Kani	Y. Mizuno, T. Furuta	HYG ·	21 km (13 mi)	MPC · JPL
5296 Friedrich	9546 P-L	Friedrich	October 17, 1960	Palomar	C. J. van Houten, I. van Houten-Groeneveld, T. Gehrels	THM	19 km (12 mi)	MPC · JPL
5297 Schinkel	4170 T-2	Schinkel	September 29, 1973	Palomar	C. J. van Houten, I. van Houten-Groeneveld, T. Gehrels	·	5.1 km (3.2 mi)	MPC · JPL
5298 Paraskevopoulos	1966 PK	Paraskevopoulos	August 7, 1966	Bloemfontein	Boyden Observatory	·	9.4 km (5.8 mi)	MPC · JPL
5299 Bittesini	1969 LB	Bittesini	June 8, 1969	El Leoncito	C. U. Cesco	·	18 km (11 mi)	MPC · JPL
5300 Sats	1974 SX_{1}	Sats	September 19, 1974	Nauchnij	L. I. Chernykh	·	3.9 km (2.4 mi)	MPC · JPL

== 5301–5400 ==
back to top

Designation			Discovery			Properties		Ref
Permanent	Provisional	Named after	Date	Site	Discoverer(s)	Category	Diam.	Ref
5301 Novobranets	1974 SD_{3}	Novobranets	September 20, 1974	Nauchnij	L. V. Zhuravleva	CYB	21 km (13 mi)	MPC · JPL
5302 Romanoserra	1976 YF_{5}	Romanoserra	December 18, 1976	Nauchnij	N. S. Chernykh	·	5.2 km (3.2 mi)	MPC · JPL
5303 Parijskij	1978 TT_{2}	Parijskij	October 3, 1978	Nauchnij	N. S. Chernykh	KOR	8.6 km (5.3 mi)	MPC · JPL
5304 Bazhenov	1978 TA_{7}	Bazhenov	October 2, 1978	Nauchnij	L. V. Zhuravleva	·	18 km (11 mi)	MPC · JPL
5305 Bernievolz	1978 VS_{5}	Bernievolz	November 7, 1978	Palomar	E. F. Helin, S. J. Bus	NYS	5.3 km (3.3 mi)	MPC · JPL
5306 Fangfen	1980 BB	Fangfen	January 25, 1980	Harvard Observatory	Harvard Observatory	KOR	8.3 km (5.2 mi)	MPC · JPL
5307 Paul-André	1980 YC	Paul-André	December 30, 1980	Anderson Mesa	E. Bowell	·	7.3 km (4.5 mi)	MPC · JPL
5308 Hutchison	1981 DC_{2}	Hutchison	February 28, 1981	Siding Spring	S. J. Bus	EUN	5.7 km (3.5 mi)	MPC · JPL
5309 MacPherson	1981 ED_{25}	MacPherson	March 2, 1981	Siding Spring	S. J. Bus	·	3.6 km (2.2 mi)	MPC · JPL
5310 Papike	1981 EP_{26}	Papike	March 2, 1981	Siding Spring	S. J. Bus	·	3.0 km (1.9 mi)	MPC · JPL
5311 Rutherford	1981 GD_{1}	Rutherford	April 3, 1981	Lake Tekapo	A. C. Gilmore, P. M. Kilmartin	·	9.3 km (5.8 mi)	MPC · JPL
5312 Schott	1981 VP_{2}	Schott	November 3, 1981	Tautenburg Observatory	F. Börngen	·	7.8 km (4.8 mi)	MPC · JPL
5313 Nunes	1982 SC_{2}	Nunes	September 18, 1982	La Silla	H. Debehogne	·	5.5 km (3.4 mi)	MPC · JPL
5314 Wilkickia	1982 SG_{4}	Wilkickia	September 20, 1982	Nauchnij	N. S. Chernykh	EOS	12 km (7.5 mi)	MPC · JPL
5315 Balʹmont	1982 SV_{5}	Balʹmont	September 16, 1982	Nauchnij	L. I. Chernykh	·	3.6 km (2.2 mi)	MPC · JPL
5316 Filatov	1982 UB_{7}	Filatov	October 21, 1982	Nauchnij	L. G. Karachkina	slow?	46 km (29 mi)	MPC · JPL
5317 Verolacqua	1983 CE	Verolacqua	February 11, 1983	Palomar	C. S. Shoemaker	EUN	9.4 km (5.8 mi)	MPC · JPL
5318 Dientzenhofer	1985 HG_{1}	Dientzenhofer	April 21, 1985	Kleť	A. Mrkos	·	6.3 km (3.9 mi)	MPC · JPL
5319 Petrovskaya	1985 RK_{6}	Petrovskaya	September 15, 1985	Nauchnij	N. S. Chernykh	moon	4.9 km (3.0 mi)	MPC · JPL
5320 Lisbeth	1985 VD	Lisbeth	November 14, 1985	Brorfelde	P. Jensen, K. Augustesen, Fogh Olsen, H. J.	·	17 km (11 mi)	MPC · JPL
5321 Jagras	1985 VN	Jagras	November 14, 1985	Brorfelde	P. Jensen, K. Augustesen, Fogh Olsen, H. J.	EUN	7.1 km (4.4 mi)	MPC · JPL
5322 Ghaffari	1986 QB_{1}	Ghaffari	August 26, 1986	La Silla	H. Debehogne	KOR	11 km (6.8 mi)	MPC · JPL
5323 Fogh	1986 TL_{4}	Fogh	October 13, 1986	Brorfelde	P. Jensen	NYS	5.5 km (3.4 mi)	MPC · JPL
5324 Lyapunov	1987 SL	Lyapunov	September 22, 1987	Nauchnij	L. G. Karachkina	T_{j} (2.88) · AMO +1 km (0.62 mi)	3.0 km (1.9 mi)	MPC · JPL
5325 Silver	1988 JQ	Silver	May 12, 1988	Palomar	C. S. Shoemaker	PHO	9.4 km (5.8 mi)	MPC · JPL
5326 Vittoriosacco	1988 RT_{6}	Vittoriosacco	September 8, 1988	La Silla	H. Debehogne	MAR	7.4 km (4.6 mi)	MPC · JPL
5327 Gertwilkens	1989 EX_{1}	Gertwilkens	March 5, 1989	Kleť	Z. Vávrová	·	12 km (7.5 mi)	MPC · JPL
5328 Nisiyamakoiti	1989 UH_{1}	Nisiyamakoiti	October 26, 1989	Kushiro	S. Ueda, H. Kaneda	·	4.5 km (2.8 mi)	MPC · JPL
5329 Decaro	1989 YP	Decaro	December 21, 1989	Siding Spring	R. H. McNaught	·	11 km (6.8 mi)	MPC · JPL
5330 Senrikyu	1990 BQ_{1}	Senrikyu	January 21, 1990	Dynic	A. Sugie	·	17 km (11 mi)	MPC · JPL
5331 Erimomisaki	1990 BT_{1}	Erimomisaki	January 27, 1990	Kitami	K. Endate, K. Watanabe	·	9.2 km (5.7 mi)	MPC · JPL
5332 Davidaguilar	1990 DA	Davidaguilar	February 16, 1990	Dynic	A. Sugie	AMO +1 km (0.62 mi)	3.6 km (2.2 mi)	MPC · JPL
5333 Kanaya	1990 UH	Kanaya	October 18, 1990	Susono	M. Akiyama, T. Furuta	·	14 km (8.7 mi)	MPC · JPL
5334 Mishima	1991 CF	Mishima	February 8, 1991	Susono	M. Akiyama, T. Furuta	·	6.2 km (3.9 mi)	MPC · JPL
5335 Damocles	1991 DA	Damocles	February 18, 1991	Siding Spring	R. H. McNaught	T_{j} (1.15) · damocloid · critical	10 km (6.2 mi)	MPC · JPL
5336 Kley	1991 JE_{1}	Kley	May 7, 1991	Uenohara	N. Kawasato	·	25 km (16 mi)	MPC · JPL
5337 Aoki	1991 LD	Aoki	June 6, 1991	Kiyosato	S. Otomo, O. Muramatsu	·	31 km (19 mi)	MPC · JPL
5338 Michelblanc	1991 RJ_{5}	Michelblanc	September 13, 1991	Palomar	H. E. Holt	KOR	9.5 km (5.9 mi)	MPC · JPL
5339 Desmars	1992 CD	Desmars	February 4, 1992	Okutama	Hioki, T., Hayakawa, S.	·	16 km (9.9 mi)	MPC · JPL
5340 Burton	4027 P-L	Burton	September 24, 1960	Palomar	C. J. van Houten, I. van Houten-Groeneveld, T. Gehrels	·	10 km (6.2 mi)	MPC · JPL
5341 Purgathofer	6040 P-L	Purgathofer	September 24, 1960	Palomar	C. J. van Houten, I. van Houten-Groeneveld, T. Gehrels	·	2.9 km (1.8 mi)	MPC · JPL
5342 Le Poole	3129 T-2	Le Poole	September 30, 1973	Palomar	C. J. van Houten, I. van Houten-Groeneveld, T. Gehrels	PHO	5.2 km (3.2 mi)	MPC · JPL
5343 Ryzhov	1977 SG_{3}	Ryzhov	September 23, 1977	Nauchnij	N. S. Chernykh	·	5.1 km (3.2 mi)	MPC · JPL
5344 Ryabov	1978 RN	Ryabov	September 1, 1978	Nauchnij	N. S. Chernykh	·	11 km (6.8 mi)	MPC · JPL
5345 Boynton	1981 EY_{8}	Boynton	March 1, 1981	Siding Spring	S. J. Bus	DOR	8.8 km (5.5 mi)	MPC · JPL
5346 Benedetti	1981 QE_{3}	Benedetti	August 24, 1981	La Silla	H. Debehogne	THM	16 km (9.9 mi)	MPC · JPL
5347 Orestelesca	1985 DX_{2}	Orestelesca	February 24, 1985	Palomar	E. F. Helin	EOS	11 km (6.8 mi)	MPC · JPL
5348 Kennoguchi	1988 BB	Kennoguchi	January 16, 1988	Chiyoda	T. Kojima	DOR	15 km (9.3 mi)	MPC · JPL
5349 Paulharris	1988 RA	Paulharris	September 7, 1988	Palomar	E. F. Helin	·	10 km (6.2 mi)	MPC · JPL
5350 Epetersen	1989 GL_{1}	Epetersen	April 3, 1989	La Silla	E. W. Elst	·	5.9 km (3.7 mi)	MPC · JPL
5351 Diderot	1989 SG_{5}	Diderot	September 26, 1989	La Silla	E. W. Elst	·	3.7 km (2.3 mi)	MPC · JPL
5352 Fujita	1989 YN	Fujita	December 27, 1989	Yatsugatake	Y. Kushida, O. Muramatsu	·	4.2 km (2.6 mi)	MPC · JPL
5353 Baillié	1989 YT	Baillié	December 20, 1989	Gekko	Y. Oshima	·	6.3 km (3.9 mi)	MPC · JPL
5354 Hisayo	1990 BJ_{2}	Hisayo	January 30, 1990	Kushiro	S. Ueda, H. Kaneda	·	16 km (9.9 mi)	MPC · JPL
5355 Akihiro	1991 CA	Akihiro	February 3, 1991	Kushiro	S. Ueda, H. Kaneda	·	5.8 km (3.6 mi)	MPC · JPL
5356 Neagari	1991 FF_{1}	Neagari	March 21, 1991	Kitami	K. Endate, K. Watanabe	EUN	9.9 km (6.2 mi)	MPC · JPL
5357 Sekiguchi	1992 EL	Sekiguchi	March 2, 1992	Kitami	T. Fujii, K. Watanabe	EOS ·	14 km (8.7 mi)	MPC · JPL
5358 Meineko	1992 QH	Meineko	August 26, 1992	Kushiro	S. Ueda, H. Kaneda	·	14 km (8.7 mi)	MPC · JPL
5359 Markzakharov	1974 QX_{1}	Markzakharov	August 24, 1974	Nauchnij	L. I. Chernykh	·	4.4 km (2.7 mi)	MPC · JPL
5360 Rozhdestvenskij	1975 VD_{9}	Rozhdestvenskij	November 8, 1975	Nauchnij	N. S. Chernykh	(1101)	28 km (17 mi)	MPC · JPL
5361 Goncharov	1976 YC_{2}	Goncharov	December 16, 1976	Nauchnij	L. I. Chernykh	(1298)	24 km (15 mi)	MPC · JPL
5362 Johnyoung	1978 CH	Johnyoung	February 2, 1978	Palomar	Gibson, J.	CYB	22 km (14 mi)	MPC · JPL
5363 Kupka	1979 UQ	Kupka	October 19, 1979	Kleť	A. Mrkos	·	5.9 km (3.7 mi)	MPC · JPL
5364 Christophschäfer	1980 RC_{1}	Christophschäfer	September 2, 1980	Kleť	Z. Vávrová	·	12 km (7.5 mi)	MPC · JPL
5365 Fievez	1981 EN_{1}	Fievez	March 7, 1981	La Silla	H. Debehogne, G. de Sanctis	·	2.8 km (1.7 mi)	MPC · JPL
5366 Rhianjones	1981 EY_{30}	Rhianjones	March 2, 1981	Siding Spring	S. J. Bus	·	4.2 km (2.6 mi)	MPC · JPL
5367 Sollenberger	1982 TT	Sollenberger	October 13, 1982	Anderson Mesa	E. Bowell	EOS	13 km (8.1 mi)	MPC · JPL
5368 Vitagliano	1984 SW_{5}	Vitagliano	September 21, 1984	La Silla	H. Debehogne	3:2	35 km (22 mi)	MPC · JPL
5369 Virgiugum	1985 SE_{1}	Virgiugum	September 22, 1985	Zimmerwald	P. Wild	·	4.5 km (2.8 mi)	MPC · JPL
5370 Taranis	1986 RA	Taranis	September 2, 1986	Palomar	A. Maury	T_{j} (2.73) · AMO · CYB · +1 km (0.62 mi) · 2:1J (unstable)	3.6 km (2.2 mi)	MPC · JPL
5371 Albertoaccomazzi	1987 VG_{1}	Albertoaccomazzi	November 15, 1987	Kushiro	S. Ueda, H. Kaneda	EOS	18 km (11 mi)	MPC · JPL
5372 Bikki	1987 WS	Bikki	November 29, 1987	Kitami	K. Endate, K. Watanabe	·	9.7 km (6.0 mi)	MPC · JPL
5373 Michaelkurtz	1988 VV_{3}	Michaelkurtz	November 14, 1988	Kushiro	S. Ueda, H. Kaneda	·	9.6 km (6.0 mi)	MPC · JPL
5374 Hokutosei	1989 AM_{1}	Hokutosei	January 4, 1989	Kitami	M. Yanai, K. Watanabe	·	39 km (24 mi)	MPC · JPL
5375 Siedentopf	1989 AN_{6}	Siedentopf	January 11, 1989	Tautenburg Observatory	F. Börngen	THM	10 km (6.2 mi)	MPC · JPL
5376 Maruthiakella	1990 DD	Maruthiakella	February 16, 1990	Kushiro	S. Ueda, H. Kaneda	PHO	8.9 km (5.5 mi)	MPC · JPL
5377 Komori	1991 FM	Komori	March 17, 1991	Kiyosato	S. Otomo, O. Muramatsu	·	3.9 km (2.4 mi)	MPC · JPL
5378 Ellyett	1991 GD	Ellyett	April 9, 1991	Siding Spring	R. H. McNaught	H	3.0 km (1.9 mi)	MPC · JPL
5379 Abehiroshi	1991 HG	Abehiroshi	April 16, 1991	Kiyosato	S. Otomo, O. Muramatsu	·	6.3 km (3.9 mi)	MPC · JPL
5380 Sprigg	1991 JT	Sprigg	May 7, 1991	Siding Spring	R. H. McNaught	·	6.6 km (4.1 mi)	MPC · JPL
5381 Sekhmet	1991 JY	Sekhmet	May 14, 1991	Palomar	C. S. Shoemaker	ATE +1 km (0.62 mi) · moon	940 m (3,080 ft)	MPC · JPL
5382 McKay	1991 JR_{2}	McKay	May 8, 1991	Siding Spring	R. H. McNaught	EUN	10 km (6.2 mi)	MPC · JPL
5383 Leavitt	4293 T-2	Leavitt	September 29, 1973	Palomar	C. J. van Houten, I. van Houten-Groeneveld, T. Gehrels	KOR	7.5 km (4.7 mi)	MPC · JPL
5384 Changjiangcun	1957 VA	Changjiangcun	November 11, 1957	Nanking	C.-H. Chang	H	8.2 km (5.1 mi)	MPC · JPL
5385 Kamenka	1975 TS_{3}	Kamenka	October 3, 1975	Nauchnij	L. I. Chernykh	·	17 km (11 mi)	MPC · JPL
5386 Bajaja	1975 TH_{6}	Bajaja	October 1, 1975	El Leoncito	Félix Aguilar Observatory	·	6.6 km (4.1 mi)	MPC · JPL
5387 Casleo	1980 NB	Casleo	July 11, 1980	Cerro El Roble	Cerro El Roble	NYS	5.5 km (3.4 mi)	MPC · JPL
5388 Mottola	1981 ED_{1}	Mottola	March 5, 1981	La Silla	H. Debehogne, G. de Sanctis	EUN	5.2 km (3.2 mi)	MPC · JPL
5389 Choikaiyau	1981 UB_{10}	Choikaiyau	October 29, 1981	Nanking	Purple Mountain	·	4.5 km (2.8 mi)	MPC · JPL
5390 Huichiming	1981 YO_{1}	Huichiming	December 19, 1981	Nanking	Purple Mountain	H · slow	3.4 km (2.1 mi)	MPC · JPL
5391 Emmons	1985 RE_{2}	Emmons	September 13, 1985	Palomar	E. F. Helin	·	5.6 km (3.5 mi)	MPC · JPL
5392 Parker	1986 AK	Parker	January 12, 1986	Palomar	C. S. Shoemaker	·	7.1 km (4.4 mi)	MPC · JPL
5393 Goldstein	1986 ET	Goldstein	March 5, 1986	Anderson Mesa	E. Bowell	·	6.4 km (4.0 mi)	MPC · JPL
5394 Jurgens	1986 EZ_{1}	Jurgens	March 6, 1986	Anderson Mesa	E. Bowell	NYS	4.9 km (3.0 mi)	MPC · JPL
5395 Shosasaki	1988 RK_{11}	Shosasaki	September 14, 1988	Cerro Tololo	S. J. Bus	·	3.0 km (1.9 mi)	MPC · JPL
5396 Kathleenhowell	1988 SH_{1}	Kathleenhowell	September 20, 1988	La Silla	H. Debehogne	·	7.4 km (4.6 mi)	MPC · JPL
5397 Vojislava	1988 VB_{5}	Vojislava	November 14, 1988	Gekko	Y. Oshima	·	11 km (6.8 mi)	MPC · JPL
5398 Jennifergannon	1989 AK_{1}	Jennifergannon	January 13, 1989	Kushiro	S. Ueda, H. Kaneda	·	10 km (6.2 mi)	MPC · JPL
5399 Awa	1989 BT	Awa	January 29, 1989	Tokushima	M. Iwamoto, T. Furuta	·	17 km (11 mi)	MPC · JPL
5400 Anniewalker	1989 CM	Anniewalker	February 4, 1989	Kushiro	S. Ueda, H. Kaneda	THM	11 km (6.8 mi)	MPC · JPL

== 5401–5500 ==
back to top

Designation			Discovery			Properties		Ref
Permanent	Provisional	Named after	Date	Site	Discoverer(s)	Category	Diam.	Ref
5401 Minamioda	1989 EV	Minamioda	March 6, 1989	Minami-Oda	T. Nomura, K. Kawanishi	GEF	9.6 km (6.0 mi)	MPC · JPL
5402 Kejosmith	1989 UK_{2}	Kejosmith	October 27, 1989	Palomar	E. F. Helin	moon	4.2 km (2.6 mi)	MPC · JPL
5403 Takachiho	1990 DM	Takachiho	February 20, 1990	Yatsugatake	Y. Kushida, Inoue, M.	·	15 km (9.3 mi)	MPC · JPL
5404 Uemura	1991 EE_{1}	Uemura	March 15, 1991	Kitami	K. Endate, K. Watanabe	·	5.7 km (3.5 mi)	MPC · JPL
5405 Neverland	1991 GY	Neverland	April 11, 1991	Yatsugatake	Y. Kushida, O. Muramatsu	·	10 km (6.2 mi)	MPC · JPL
5406 Jonjoseph	1991 PH_{11}	Jonjoseph	August 9, 1991	Palomar	H. E. Holt	·	17 km (11 mi)	MPC · JPL
5407	1992 AX	—	January 4, 1992	Kushiro	S. Ueda, H. Kaneda	moon	2.8 km (1.7 mi)	MPC · JPL
5408 Thé	1232 T-1	Thé	March 25, 1971	Palomar	C. J. van Houten, I. van Houten-Groeneveld, T. Gehrels	·	4.2 km (2.6 mi)	MPC · JPL
5409 Saale	1962 SR	Saale	September 30, 1962	Tautenburg Observatory	F. Börngen	·	6.8 km (4.2 mi)	MPC · JPL
5410 Spivakov	1967 DA	Spivakov	February 16, 1967	Nauchnij	T. M. Smirnova	·	9.6 km (6.0 mi)	MPC · JPL
5411 Liia	1973 AT_{3}	Liia	January 2, 1973	Nauchnij	N. S. Chernykh	·	19 km (12 mi)	MPC · JPL
5412 Rou	1973 SR_{3}	Rou	September 25, 1973	Nauchnij	L. V. Zhuravleva	NYS	4.9 km (3.0 mi)	MPC · JPL
5413 Smyslov	1977 EC_{2}	Smyslov	March 13, 1977	Nauchnij	N. S. Chernykh	THM	18 km (11 mi)	MPC · JPL
5414 Sokolov	1977 RW_{6}	Sokolov	September 11, 1977	Nauchnij	N. S. Chernykh	KOR	7.6 km (4.7 mi)	MPC · JPL
5415 Lyanzuridi	1978 TB_{2}	Lyanzuridi	October 3, 1978	Nauchnij	N. S. Chernykh	·	4.6 km (2.9 mi)	MPC · JPL
5416 Estremadoyro	1978 VE_{5}	Estremadoyro	November 7, 1978	Palomar	E. F. Helin, S. J. Bus	DOR	19 km (12 mi)	MPC · JPL
5417 Solovaya	1981 QT	Solovaya	August 24, 1981	Kleť	L. Brožek	·	5.6 km (3.5 mi)	MPC · JPL
5418 Joyce	1981 QG_{1}	Joyce	August 29, 1981	Kleť	A. Mrkos	·	14 km (8.7 mi)	MPC · JPL
5419 Benua	1981 SW_{7}	Benua	September 29, 1981	Nauchnij	L. V. Zhuravleva	·	14 km (8.7 mi)	MPC · JPL
5420 Jancis	1982 JR_{1}	Jancis	May 15, 1982	Palomar	Palomar	·	12 km (7.5 mi)	MPC · JPL
5421 Ulanova	1982 TD_{2}	Ulanova	October 14, 1982	Nauchnij	L. V. Zhuravleva, L. G. Karachkina	·	4.2 km (2.6 mi)	MPC · JPL
5422 Hodgkin	1982 YL_{1}	Hodgkin	December 23, 1982	Nauchnij	L. G. Karachkina	·	16 km (9.9 mi)	MPC · JPL
5423 Horahořejš	1983 DC	Horahořejš	February 16, 1983	Kleť	Z. Vávrová	·	8.9 km (5.5 mi)	MPC · JPL
5424 Covington	1983 TN_{1}	Covington	October 12, 1983	Anderson Mesa	E. Bowell	·	4.4 km (2.7 mi)	MPC · JPL
5425 Vojtěch	1984 SA_{1}	Vojtěch	September 20, 1984	Kleť	A. Mrkos	V · moon	7.1 km (4.4 mi)	MPC · JPL
5426 Sharp	1985 DD	Sharp	February 16, 1985	Palomar	C. S. Shoemaker	H · moon	2.0 km (1.2 mi)	MPC · JPL
5427 Jensmartin	1986 JQ	Jensmartin	May 13, 1986	Brorfelde	P. Jensen	H	3.2 km (2.0 mi)	MPC · JPL
5428	1987 RA_{1}	—	September 13, 1987	La Silla	H. Debehogne	KOR	9.3 km (5.8 mi)	MPC · JPL
5429	1988 BZ_{1}	—	January 25, 1988	Kushiro	S. Ueda, H. Kaneda	THM	14 km (8.7 mi)	MPC · JPL
5430 Luu	1988 JA_{1}	Luu	May 12, 1988	Palomar	C. S. Shoemaker, E. M. Shoemaker	PHO	6.7 km (4.2 mi)	MPC · JPL
5431 Maxinehelin	1988 MB	Maxinehelin	June 19, 1988	Palomar	E. F. Helin	·	6.2 km (3.9 mi)	MPC · JPL
5432 Imakiire	1988 VN	Imakiire	November 3, 1988	Chiyoda	T. Kojima	·	6.0 km (3.7 mi)	MPC · JPL
5433 Kairen	1988 VZ_{2}	Kairen	November 10, 1988	Chiyoda	T. Kojima	·	8.5 km (5.3 mi)	MPC · JPL
5434 Tomwhitney	1989 ES	Tomwhitney	March 6, 1989	Palomar	E. F. Helin	URS	17 km (11 mi)	MPC · JPL
5435 Kameoka	1990 BS_{1}	Kameoka	January 21, 1990	Dynic	A. Sugie	·	26 km (16 mi)	MPC · JPL
5436 Eumelos	1990 DK	Eumelos	February 20, 1990	Palomar	C. S. Shoemaker, E. M. Shoemaker	L4	38 km (24 mi)	MPC · JPL
5437	1990 DU_{3}	—	February 26, 1990	La Silla	H. Debehogne	V	6.5 km (4.0 mi)	MPC · JPL
5438 Lorre	1990 QJ	Lorre	August 18, 1990	Palomar	E. F. Helin	·	28 km (17 mi)	MPC · JPL
5439 Couturier	1990 RW	Couturier	September 14, 1990	Palomar	H. E. Holt	3:2 · slow	22 km (14 mi)	MPC · JPL
5440 Terao	1991 HD	Terao	April 16, 1991	Dynic	A. Sugie	·	5.5 km (3.4 mi)	MPC · JPL
5441 Andymurray	1991 JZ_{1}	Andymurray	May 8, 1991	Siding Spring	R. H. McNaught	EOS	15 km (9.3 mi)	MPC · JPL
5442 Drossart	1991 NH_{1}	Drossart	July 12, 1991	Palomar	H. E. Holt	KOR	7.4 km (4.6 mi)	MPC · JPL
5443 Encrenaz	1991 NX_{1}	Encrenaz	July 14, 1991	Palomar	H. E. Holt	·	11 km (6.8 mi)	MPC · JPL
5444 Gautier	1991 PM_{8}	Gautier	August 5, 1991	Palomar	H. E. Holt	·	5.0 km (3.1 mi)	MPC · JPL
5445 Williwaw	1991 PA_{12}	Williwaw	August 7, 1991	Palomar	H. E. Holt	·	8.8 km (5.5 mi)	MPC · JPL
5446 Heyler	1991 PB_{13}	Heyler	August 5, 1991	Palomar	H. E. Holt	THM	19 km (12 mi)	MPC · JPL
5447 Lallement	1991 PO_{14}	Lallement	August 6, 1991	Palomar	H. E. Holt	EOS	11 km (6.8 mi)	MPC · JPL
5448 Siebold	1992 SP	Siebold	September 26, 1992	Dynic	A. Sugie	·	6.4 km (4.0 mi)	MPC · JPL
5449	1992 US_{5}	—	October 28, 1992	Kushiro	S. Ueda, H. Kaneda	EOS	11 km (6.8 mi)	MPC · JPL
5450 Sokrates	2780 P-L	Sokrates	September 24, 1960	Palomar	C. J. van Houten, I. van Houten-Groeneveld, T. Gehrels	·	21 km (13 mi)	MPC · JPL
5451 Plato	4598 P-L	Plato	September 24, 1960	Palomar	C. J. van Houten, I. van Houten-Groeneveld, T. Gehrels	·	8.7 km (5.4 mi)	MPC · JPL
5452	1937 NN	—	July 5, 1937	Johannesburg	C. Jackson	·	6.6 km (4.1 mi)	MPC · JPL
5453 Zakharchenya	1975 VS_{5}	Zakharchenya	November 3, 1975	Nauchnij	T. M. Smirnova	·	4.6 km (2.9 mi)	MPC · JPL
5454 Kojiki	1977 EW_{5}	Kojiki	March 12, 1977	Kiso	H. Kosai, K. Furukawa	(1298)	17 km (11 mi)	MPC · JPL
5455 Surkov	1978 RV_{5}	Surkov	September 13, 1978	Nauchnij	N. S. Chernykh	·	4.0 km (2.5 mi)	MPC · JPL
5456 Merman	1979 HH_{3}	Merman	April 25, 1979	Nauchnij	N. S. Chernykh	V	4.2 km (2.6 mi)	MPC · JPL
5457 Queen's	1980 TW_{5}	Queen's	October 9, 1980	Palomar	C. S. Shoemaker	moon	21 km (13 mi)	MPC · JPL
5458 Aizman	1980 TB_{12}	Aizman	October 10, 1980	Nauchnij	N. S. Chernykh	·	18 km (11 mi)	MPC · JPL
5459 Saraburger	1981 QP_{3}	Saraburger	August 26, 1981	La Silla	H. Debehogne	KOR	6.8 km (4.2 mi)	MPC · JPL
5460 Tsénaatʼaʼí	1983 AW	Tsénaatʼaʼí	January 12, 1983	Anderson Mesa	B. A. Skiff	·	3.5 km (2.2 mi)	MPC · JPL
5461 Autumn	1983 HB_{1}	Autumn	April 18, 1983	Anderson Mesa	N. G. Thomas	·	21 km (13 mi)	MPC · JPL
5462	1984 SX_{5}	—	September 21, 1984	La Silla	H. Debehogne	V	3.9 km (2.4 mi)	MPC · JPL
5463 Danwelcher	1985 TO	Danwelcher	October 15, 1985	Anderson Mesa	E. Bowell	·	5.0 km (3.1 mi)	MPC · JPL
5464 Weller	1985 VC_{1}	Weller	November 7, 1985	Anderson Mesa	E. Bowell	EUN	9.7 km (6.0 mi)	MPC · JPL
5465 Chumakov	1986 RF_{13}	Chumakov	September 9, 1986	Nauchnij	L. G. Karachkina	KOR	7.7 km (4.8 mi)	MPC · JPL
5466 Makibi	1986 WP_{8}	Makibi	November 30, 1986	Kiso	H. Kosai, K. Furukawa	THM	8.9 km (5.5 mi)	MPC · JPL
5467	1988 AG	—	January 11, 1988	Okutama	Hioki, T., N. Kawasato	·	10 km (6.2 mi)	MPC · JPL
5468 Hamatonbetsu	1988 BK	Hamatonbetsu	January 16, 1988	Kagoshima	M. Mukai, Takeishi, M.	·	24 km (15 mi)	MPC · JPL
5469	1988 BK_{4}	—	January 21, 1988	La Silla	H. Debehogne	·	15 km (9.3 mi)	MPC · JPL
5470 Kurtlindstrom	1988 BK_{5}	Kurtlindstrom	January 28, 1988	Siding Spring	R. H. McNaught	·	14 km (8.7 mi)	MPC · JPL
5471 Tunguska	1988 PK_{1}	Tunguska	August 13, 1988	Haute-Provence	E. W. Elst	EOS	16 km (9.9 mi)	MPC · JPL
5472	1988 RR	—	September 13, 1988	Kushiro	S. Ueda, H. Kaneda	·	3.9 km (2.4 mi)	MPC · JPL
5473 Yamanashi	1988 VR	Yamanashi	November 5, 1988	Yatsugatake	Y. Kushida, O. Muramatsu	·	5.2 km (3.2 mi)	MPC · JPL
5474 Gingasen	1988 XE_{1}	Gingasen	December 3, 1988	Kitami	T. Fujii, K. Watanabe	moon	5.0 km (3.1 mi)	MPC · JPL
5475 Hanskennedy	1989 QO	Hanskennedy	August 26, 1989	Siding Spring	R. H. McNaught	H	2.0 km (1.2 mi)	MPC · JPL
5476 Mulius	1989 TO_{11}	Mulius	October 2, 1989	Cerro Tololo	S. J. Bus	L5	35 km (22 mi)	MPC · JPL
5477 Holmes	1989 UH_{2}	Holmes	October 27, 1989	Palomar	E. F. Helin	H · moon	3.1 km (1.9 mi)	MPC · JPL
5478 Wartburg	1989 UE_{4}	Wartburg	October 23, 1989	Tautenburg Observatory	F. Börngen	·	9.0 km (5.6 mi)	MPC · JPL
5479 Grahamryder	1989 UT_{5}	Grahamryder	October 30, 1989	Cerro Tololo	S. J. Bus	EUN	5.8 km (3.6 mi)	MPC · JPL
5480	1989 YK_{8}	—	December 23, 1989	Kushiro	S. Ueda, H. Kaneda	·	15 km (9.3 mi)	MPC · JPL
5481 Kiuchi	1990 CH	Kiuchi	February 15, 1990	Kitami	K. Endate, K. Watanabe	V · moon	4.7 km (2.9 mi)	MPC · JPL
5482 Korankei	1990 DX	Korankei	February 27, 1990	Toyota	K. Suzuki, T. Urata	·	5.7 km (3.5 mi)	MPC · JPL
5483 Cherkashin	1990 UQ_{11}	Cherkashin	October 17, 1990	Nauchnij	L. I. Chernykh	·	17 km (11 mi)	MPC · JPL
5484 Inoda	1990 VH_{1}	Inoda	November 7, 1990	Oohira	T. Urata	PHO	10 km (6.2 mi)	MPC · JPL
5485 Kaula	1991 RQ_{21}	Kaula	September 11, 1991	Palomar	H. E. Holt	·	10 km (6.2 mi)	MPC · JPL
5486	1991 UT_{2}	—	October 31, 1991	Kushiro	S. Ueda, H. Kaneda	·	7.2 km (4.5 mi)	MPC · JPL
5487	1991 UM_{4}	—	October 18, 1991	Kushiro	S. Ueda, H. Kaneda	·	7.0 km (4.3 mi)	MPC · JPL
5488 Kiyosato	1991 VK_{5}	Kiyosato	November 13, 1991	Kiyosato	S. Otomo	EOS	19 km (12 mi)	MPC · JPL
5489 Oberkochen	1993 BF_{2}	Oberkochen	January 17, 1993	Yatsugatake	Y. Kushida, O. Muramatsu	EUN	13 km (8.1 mi)	MPC · JPL
5490 Burbidge	2019 P-L	Burbidge	September 24, 1960	Palomar	C. J. van Houten, I. van Houten-Groeneveld, T. Gehrels	·	3.6 km (2.2 mi)	MPC · JPL
5491 Kaulbach	3128 T-1	Kaulbach	March 26, 1971	Palomar	C. J. van Houten, I. van Houten-Groeneveld, T. Gehrels	·	4.3 km (2.7 mi)	MPC · JPL
5492 Thoma	3227 T-1	Thoma	March 26, 1971	Palomar	C. J. van Houten, I. van Houten-Groeneveld, T. Gehrels	WAT	13 km (8.1 mi)	MPC · JPL
5493 Spitzweg	1617 T-2	Spitzweg	September 24, 1973	Palomar	C. J. van Houten, I. van Houten-Groeneveld, T. Gehrels	·	7.2 km (4.5 mi)	MPC · JPL
5494 Johanmohr	1933 UM_{1}	Johanmohr	October 19, 1933	Heidelberg	K. Reinmuth	KOR	8.9 km (5.5 mi)	MPC · JPL
5495 Rumyantsev	1972 RY_{3}	Rumyantsev	September 6, 1972	Nauchnij	L. V. Zhuravleva	CYB	26 km (16 mi)	MPC · JPL
5496	1973 NA	—	July 4, 1973	Palomar	E. F. Helin	T_{j} (2.53) · APO +1 km (0.62 mi)	2.1 km (1.3 mi)	MPC · JPL
5497 Sararussell	1975 SS	Sararussell	September 30, 1975	Palomar	S. J. Bus	EOS	11 km (6.8 mi)	MPC · JPL
5498 Gustafsson	1980 FT_{3}	Gustafsson	March 16, 1980	La Silla	C.-I. Lagerkvist	·	3.5 km (2.2 mi)	MPC · JPL
5499	1981 SU_{2}	—	September 29, 1981	Haute-Provence	Haute Provence	·	3.8 km (2.4 mi)	MPC · JPL
5500 Twilley	1981 WR	Twilley	November 24, 1981	Anderson Mesa	E. Bowell	moon	4.5 km (2.8 mi)	MPC · JPL

== 5501–5600 ==
back to top

Designation			Discovery			Properties		Ref
Permanent	Provisional	Named after	Date	Site	Discoverer(s)	Category	Diam.	Ref
5501	1982 FF_{2}	—	March 30, 1982	Socorro	Taff, L. G.	·	7.3 km (4.5 mi)	MPC · JPL
5502 Brashear	1984 EC	Brashear	March 1, 1984	Anderson Mesa	E. Bowell	EUN	6.5 km (4.0 mi)	MPC · JPL
5503	1985 CE_{2}	—	February 13, 1985	La Silla	H. Debehogne	·	7.4 km (4.6 mi)	MPC · JPL
5504 Lanzerotti	1985 FC_{2}	Lanzerotti	March 22, 1985	Anderson Mesa	E. Bowell	·	7.2 km (4.5 mi)	MPC · JPL
5505 Rundetaarn	1986 VD_{1}	Rundetaarn	November 6, 1986	Brorfelde	P. Jensen	·	22 km (14 mi)	MPC · JPL
5506 Artiglio	1987 SV_{11}	Artiglio	September 24, 1987	La Silla	H. Debehogne	ERI	11 km (6.8 mi)	MPC · JPL
5507 Niijima	1987 UJ	Niijima	October 21, 1987	Toyota	K. Suzuki, T. Urata	(5)	5.5 km (3.4 mi)	MPC · JPL
5508 Gomyou	1988 EB	Gomyou	March 9, 1988	Oohira	Oohira	·	15 km (9.3 mi)	MPC · JPL
5509 Rennsteig	1988 RD_{3}	Rennsteig	September 8, 1988	Tautenburg Observatory	F. Börngen	·	3.1 km (1.9 mi)	MPC · JPL
5510	1988 RF_{7}	—	September 2, 1988	La Silla	H. Debehogne	·	4.3 km (2.7 mi)	MPC · JPL
5511 Cloanthus	1988 TH_{1}	Cloanthus	October 8, 1988	Palomar	C. S. Shoemaker, E. M. Shoemaker	L5 · slow	40 km (25 mi)	MPC · JPL
5512	1988 VD_{7}	—	November 10, 1988	Okutama	Hioki, T., N. Kawasato	·	5.3 km (3.3 mi)	MPC · JPL
5513 Yukio	1988 WB	Yukio	November 27, 1988	Oohira	Kakei, W., M. Kizawa, T. Urata	·	5.1 km (3.2 mi)	MPC · JPL
5514 Karelraška	1989 BN_{1}	Karelraška	January 29, 1989	Kleť	Z. Vávrová	·	5.2 km (3.2 mi)	MPC · JPL
5515 Naderi	1989 EL_{1}	Naderi	March 5, 1989	Palomar	E. F. Helin	·	7.0 km (4.3 mi)	MPC · JPL
5516 Jawilliamson	1989 JK	Jawilliamson	May 2, 1989	Palomar	E. F. Helin	·	12 km (7.5 mi)	MPC · JPL
5517 Johnerogers	1989 LJ	Johnerogers	June 4, 1989	Palomar	E. F. Helin	EUN	6.0 km (3.7 mi)	MPC · JPL
5518 Mariobotta	1989 YF	Mariobotta	December 30, 1989	Chions	J. M. Baur	slow	7.2 km (4.5 mi)	MPC · JPL
5519 Lellouch	1990 QB_{4}	Lellouch	August 23, 1990	Palomar	H. E. Holt	·	20 km (12 mi)	MPC · JPL
5520 Natori	1990 RB	Natori	September 12, 1990	Oohira	T. Urata	EOS	12 km (7.5 mi)	MPC · JPL
5521 Morpurgo	1991 PM_{1}	Morpurgo	August 15, 1991	Palomar	E. F. Helin	·	10 km (6.2 mi)	MPC · JPL
5522 De Rop	1991 PJ_{5}	De Rop	August 3, 1991	La Silla	E. W. Elst	NYS	5.4 km (3.4 mi)	MPC · JPL
5523 Luminet	1991 PH_{8}	Luminet	August 5, 1991	Palomar	H. E. Holt	KOR	8.1 km (5.0 mi)	MPC · JPL
5524 Lecacheux	1991 RA_{30}	Lecacheux	September 15, 1991	Palomar	H. E. Holt	·	20 km (12 mi)	MPC · JPL
5525	1991 TS_{4}	—	October 15, 1991	Uenohara	N. Kawasato	·	5.3 km (3.3 mi)	MPC · JPL
5526 Kenzo	1991 UP_{1}	Kenzo	October 18, 1991	Oohira	T. Urata	EUN	7.4 km (4.6 mi)	MPC · JPL
5527	1991 UQ_{3}	—	October 31, 1991	Kushiro	S. Ueda, H. Kaneda	·	4.9 km (3.0 mi)	MPC · JPL
5528	1992 AJ	—	January 2, 1992	Kushiro	S. Ueda, H. Kaneda	·	21 km (13 mi)	MPC · JPL
5529 Perry	2557 P-L	Perry	September 24, 1960	Palomar	C. J. van Houten, I. van Houten-Groeneveld, T. Gehrels	·	3.6 km (2.2 mi)	MPC · JPL
5530 Eisinga	2835 P-L	Eisinga	September 24, 1960	Palomar	C. J. van Houten, I. van Houten-Groeneveld, T. Gehrels	·	4.7 km (2.9 mi)	MPC · JPL
5531 Carolientje	1051 T-2	Carolientje	September 29, 1973	Palomar	C. J. van Houten, I. van Houten-Groeneveld, T. Gehrels	·	10 km (6.2 mi)	MPC · JPL
5532 Ichinohe	1932 CY	Ichinohe	February 14, 1932	Heidelberg	K. Reinmuth	·	18 km (11 mi)	MPC · JPL
5533 Bagrov	1935 SC	Bagrov	September 21, 1935	Crimea–Simeis	P. F. Shajn	·	4.5 km (2.8 mi)	MPC · JPL
5534	1941 UN	—	October 15, 1941	Turku	L. Oterma	·	8.5 km (5.3 mi)	MPC · JPL
5535 Annefrank	1942 EM	Annefrank	March 23, 1942	Heidelberg	K. Reinmuth	(254)	4.8 km (3.0 mi)	MPC · JPL
5536 Honeycutt	1955 QN	Honeycutt	August 23, 1955	Brooklyn	Indiana University	moon	7.0 km (4.3 mi)	MPC · JPL
5537 Sanya	1964 TA_{2}	Sanya	October 9, 1964	Nanking	Purple Mountain	·	3.9 km (2.4 mi)	MPC · JPL
5538 Luichewoo	1964 TU_{2}	Luichewoo	October 9, 1964	Nanking	Purple Mountain	slow	3.6 km (2.2 mi)	MPC · JPL
5539 Limporyen	1965 UA_{1}	Limporyen	October 16, 1965	Nanking	Purple Mountain	NYS	10 km (6.2 mi)	MPC · JPL
5540 Smirnova	1971 QR_{1}	Smirnova	August 30, 1971	Nauchnij	T. M. Smirnova	(5)	3.6 km (2.2 mi)	MPC · JPL
5541 Seimei	1976 UH_{16}	Seimei	October 22, 1976	Kiso	H. Kosai, K. Furukawa	·	13 km (8.1 mi)	MPC · JPL
5542 Moffatt	1978 PT_{4}	Moffatt	August 6, 1978	Bickley	Perth Observatory	MAR	8.6 km (5.3 mi)	MPC · JPL
5543 Sharaf	1978 TW_{2}	Sharaf	October 3, 1978	Nauchnij	N. S. Chernykh	·	4.4 km (2.7 mi)	MPC · JPL
5544 Kazakov	1978 TH_{6}	Kazakov	October 2, 1978	Nauchnij	L. V. Zhuravleva	EUN	6.7 km (4.2 mi)	MPC · JPL
5545 Makarov	1978 VY_{14}	Makarov	November 1, 1978	Nauchnij	L. V. Zhuravleva	·	6.1 km (3.8 mi)	MPC · JPL
5546 Salavat	1979 YS	Salavat	December 18, 1979	La Silla	H. Debehogne	EUN	8.4 km (5.2 mi)	MPC · JPL
5547 Acadiau	1980 LE_{1}	Acadiau	June 11, 1980	Palomar	C. S. Shoemaker	EUN	9.2 km (5.7 mi)	MPC · JPL
5548 Thosharriot	1980 TH	Thosharriot	October 3, 1980	Kleť	Z. Vávrová	EOS	12 km (7.5 mi)	MPC · JPL
5549 Bobstefanik	1981 GM_{1}	Bobstefanik	April 1, 1981	Harvard Observatory	Harvard Observatory	EUN	6.4 km (4.0 mi)	MPC · JPL
5550	1981 UB_{1}	—	October 30, 1981	Socorro	Taff, L. G.	THM	18 km (11 mi)	MPC · JPL
5551 Glikson	1982 BJ	Glikson	January 24, 1982	Palomar	C. S. Shoemaker, E. M. Shoemaker	PHO	5.6 km (3.5 mi)	MPC · JPL
5552 Studnička	1982 SJ_{1}	Studnička	September 16, 1982	Kleť	A. Mrkos	·	7.3 km (4.5 mi)	MPC · JPL
5553 Chodas	1984 CM_{1}	Chodas	February 6, 1984	Anderson Mesa	E. Bowell	CLO	10 km (6.2 mi)	MPC · JPL
5554 Keesey	1985 TW_{1}	Keesey	October 15, 1985	Anderson Mesa	E. Bowell	·	4.2 km (2.6 mi)	MPC · JPL
5555 Wimberly	1986 VF_{5}	Wimberly	November 5, 1986	Anderson Mesa	E. Bowell	EOS	11 km (6.8 mi)	MPC · JPL
5556	1988 AL	—	January 15, 1988	Kushiro	S. Ueda, H. Kaneda	·	13 km (8.1 mi)	MPC · JPL
5557 Chimikeppuko	1989 CM_{1}	Chimikeppuko	February 7, 1989	Kitami	K. Endate, K. Watanabe	·	7.1 km (4.4 mi)	MPC · JPL
5558 Johnnapier	1989 WL_{2}	Johnnapier	November 24, 1989	Siding Spring	R. H. McNaught	H	2.3 km (1.4 mi)	MPC · JPL
5559 Beategordon	1990 MV	Beategordon	June 27, 1990	Palomar	E. F. Helin	·	7.6 km (4.7 mi)	MPC · JPL
5560 Amytis	1990 MX	Amytis	June 27, 1990	Palomar	E. F. Helin	·	4.7 km (2.9 mi)	MPC · JPL
5561 Iguchi	1991 QD	Iguchi	August 17, 1991	Kiyosato	S. Otomo	slow	6.9 km (4.3 mi)	MPC · JPL
5562 Sumi	1991 VS	Sumi	November 4, 1991	Kushiro	S. Ueda, H. Kaneda	·	4.5 km (2.8 mi)	MPC · JPL
5563 Yuuri	1991 VZ_{1}	Yuuri	November 9, 1991	Kushiro	S. Ueda, H. Kaneda	·	10 km (6.2 mi)	MPC · JPL
5564 Hikari	1991 VH_{2}	Hikari	November 9, 1991	Kushiro	S. Ueda, H. Kaneda	·	6.2 km (3.9 mi)	MPC · JPL
5565 Ukyounodaibu	1991 VN_{2}	Ukyounodaibu	November 10, 1991	Yakiimo	Natori, A., T. Urata	·	12 km (7.5 mi)	MPC · JPL
5566	1991 VY_{3}	—	November 11, 1991	Kushiro	S. Ueda, H. Kaneda	THM	14 km (8.7 mi)	MPC · JPL
5567 Durisen	1953 FK_{1}	Durisen	March 21, 1953	Brooklyn	Indiana University	·	36 km (22 mi)	MPC · JPL
5568 Mufson	1953 TS_{2}	Mufson	October 14, 1953	Brooklyn	Indiana University	·	5.2 km (3.2 mi)	MPC · JPL
5569 Colby	1974 FO	Colby	March 22, 1974	Cerro El Roble	C. Torres	·	8.0 km (5.0 mi)	MPC · JPL
5570 Kirsan	1976 GM_{7}	Kirsan	April 4, 1976	Nauchnij	N. S. Chernykh	·	15 km (9.3 mi)	MPC · JPL
5571 Lesliegreen	1978 LG	Lesliegreen	June 1, 1978	La Silla	K. W. Kamper	EOS	14 km (8.7 mi)	MPC · JPL
5572 Bliskunov	1978 SS_{2}	Bliskunov	September 26, 1978	Nauchnij	L. V. Zhuravleva	·	20 km (12 mi)	MPC · JPL
5573 Hilarydownes	1981 QX	Hilarydownes	August 24, 1981	Kleť	A. Mrkos	·	10 km (6.2 mi)	MPC · JPL
5574 Seagrave	1984 FS	Seagrave	March 20, 1984	Kleť	Z. Vávrová	EUN	8.9 km (5.5 mi)	MPC · JPL
5575 Ryanpark	1985 RP_{2}	Ryanpark	September 4, 1985	La Silla	H. Debehogne	THM	10 km (6.2 mi)	MPC · JPL
5576 Albanese	1986 UM_{1}	Albanese	October 26, 1986	Caussols	CERGA	·	24 km (15 mi)	MPC · JPL
5577 Priestley	1986 WQ_{2}	Priestley	November 21, 1986	Siding Spring	J. D. Waldron	H · slow	4.0 km (2.5 mi)	MPC · JPL
5578 Takakura	1987 BC	Takakura	January 28, 1987	Ojima	T. Niijima, T. Urata	KOR	8.1 km (5.0 mi)	MPC · JPL
5579 Uhlherr	1988 JL	Uhlherr	May 11, 1988	Palomar	C. S. Shoemaker, E. M. Shoemaker	H	2.7 km (1.7 mi)	MPC · JPL
5580 Sharidake	1988 RP_{1}	Sharidake	September 10, 1988	Kitami	K. Endate, K. Watanabe	·	3.8 km (2.4 mi)	MPC · JPL
5581 Mitsuko	1989 CY_{1}	Mitsuko	February 10, 1989	Tokushima	M. Iwamoto, T. Furuta	NYS	6.2 km (3.9 mi)	MPC · JPL
5582	1989 CU_{8}	—	February 13, 1989	La Silla	H. Debehogne	KOR	7.6 km (4.7 mi)	MPC · JPL
5583 Braunerová	1989 EY_{1}	Braunerová	March 5, 1989	Kleť	A. Mrkos	KOR	8.2 km (5.1 mi)	MPC · JPL
5584 Izenberg	1989 KK	Izenberg	May 31, 1989	Palomar	H. E. Holt	EUN	6.7 km (4.2 mi)	MPC · JPL
5585 Parks	1990 MJ	Parks	June 28, 1990	Palomar	E. F. Helin	·	6.8 km (4.2 mi)	MPC · JPL
5586	1990 RE_{6}	—	September 9, 1990	La Silla	H. Debehogne	·	7.2 km (4.5 mi)	MPC · JPL
5587	1990 SB	—	September 16, 1990	Palomar	H. E. Holt, Brown, J. A.	AMO +1 km (0.62 mi)	3.6 km (2.2 mi)	MPC · JPL
5588 Jennabelle	1990 SW_{3}	Jennabelle	September 23, 1990	Palomar	B. Roman	·	11 km (6.8 mi)	MPC · JPL
5589 De Meis	1990 SD_{14}	De Meis	September 23, 1990	La Silla	H. Debehogne	·	7.4 km (4.6 mi)	MPC · JPL
5590	1990 VA	—	November 9, 1990	Kitt Peak	Spacewatch	ATE	370 m (1,210 ft)	MPC · JPL
5591 Koyo	1990 VF_{2}	Koyo	November 10, 1990	Oohira	T. Urata	HOF	17 km (11 mi)	MPC · JPL
5592 Oshima	1990 VB_{4}	Oshima	November 14, 1990	Toyota	K. Suzuki, T. Urata	VER	23 km (14 mi)	MPC · JPL
5593 Jonsujatha	1991 JN_{1}	Jonsujatha	May 9, 1991	Palomar	E. F. Helin	(2076)	7.3 km (4.5 mi)	MPC · JPL
5594 Jimmiller	1991 NK_{1}	Jimmiller	July 12, 1991	Palomar	H. E. Holt	VER	26 km (16 mi)	MPC · JPL
5595 Roth	1991 PJ	Roth	August 5, 1991	Palomar	H. E. Holt	·	9.8 km (6.1 mi)	MPC · JPL
5596 Morbidelli	1991 PQ_{10}	Morbidelli	August 7, 1991	Palomar	H. E. Holt	·	5.7 km (3.5 mi)	MPC · JPL
5597 Warren	1991 PC_{13}	Warren	August 5, 1991	Palomar	H. E. Holt	·	4.0 km (2.5 mi)	MPC · JPL
5598 Carlmurray	1991 PN_{18}	Carlmurray	August 8, 1991	Palomar	H. E. Holt	·	6.9 km (4.3 mi)	MPC · JPL
5599	1991 SG_{1}	—	September 29, 1991	Kushiro	S. Ueda, H. Kaneda	·	6.4 km (4.0 mi)	MPC · JPL
5600	1991 UY	—	October 18, 1991	Kushiro	S. Ueda, H. Kaneda	·	5.9 km (3.7 mi)	MPC · JPL

== 5601–5700 ==
back to top

Designation			Discovery			Properties		Ref
Permanent	Provisional	Named after	Date	Site	Discoverer(s)	Category	Diam.	Ref
5601	1991 VR	—	November 4, 1991	Kushiro	S. Ueda, H. Kaneda	·	4.5 km (2.8 mi)	MPC · JPL
5602	1991 VM_{1}	—	November 4, 1991	Kushiro	S. Ueda, H. Kaneda	(254)	3.8 km (2.4 mi)	MPC · JPL
5603 Rausudake	1992 CE	Rausudake	February 5, 1992	Kitami	K. Endate, K. Watanabe	3:2	46 km (29 mi)	MPC · JPL
5604	1992 FE	—	March 26, 1992	Siding Spring	R. H. McNaught	ATE +1 km (0.62 mi) · PHA	550 m (1,800 ft)	MPC · JPL
5605 Kushida	1993 DB	Kushida	February 17, 1993	Kiyosato	S. Otomo	·	5.2 km (3.2 mi)	MPC · JPL
5606 Muramatsu	1993 EH	Muramatsu	March 1, 1993	Kiyosato	S. Otomo	·	4.8 km (3.0 mi)	MPC · JPL
5607	1993 EN	—	March 12, 1993	Kushiro	S. Ueda, H. Kaneda	·	9.1 km (5.7 mi)	MPC · JPL
5608 Olmos	1993 EO	Olmos	March 12, 1993	Kushiro	S. Ueda, H. Kaneda	slow	6.7 km (4.2 mi)	MPC · JPL
5609 Stroncone	1993 FU	Stroncone	March 22, 1993	Stroncone	A. Vagnozzi	THM	14 km (8.7 mi)	MPC · JPL
5610 Balster	2041 T-3	Balster	October 16, 1977	Palomar	C. J. van Houten, I. van Houten-Groeneveld, T. Gehrels	AGN	7.8 km (4.8 mi)	MPC · JPL
5611	1943 DL	—	February 26, 1943	Turku	L. Oterma	EUN · slow ·	9.4 km (5.8 mi)	MPC · JPL
5612 Nevskij	1975 TX_{2}	Nevskij	October 3, 1975	Nauchnij	L. I. Chernykh	·	5.2 km (3.2 mi)	MPC · JPL
5613 Donskoj	1976 YP_{1}	Donskoj	December 16, 1976	Nauchnij	L. I. Chernykh	THM	14 km (8.7 mi)	MPC · JPL
5614 Yakovlev	1979 VN	Yakovlev	November 11, 1979	Nauchnij	N. S. Chernykh	·	13 km (8.1 mi)	MPC · JPL
5615 Iskander	1983 PZ	Iskander	August 4, 1983	Nauchnij	L. G. Karachkina	(2076)	5.5 km (3.4 mi)	MPC · JPL
5616 Vogtland	1987 ST_{10}	Vogtland	September 29, 1987	Tautenburg Observatory	F. Börngen	·	10 km (6.2 mi)	MPC · JPL
5617 Emelyanenko	1989 EL	Emelyanenko	March 5, 1989	Palomar	E. F. Helin	slow	4.7 km (2.9 mi)	MPC · JPL
5618 Saitama	1990 EA	Saitama	March 4, 1990	Dynic	A. Sugie	·	3.7 km (2.3 mi)	MPC · JPL
5619 Shair	1990 HC_{1}	Shair	April 26, 1990	Palomar	E. F. Helin	·	12 km (7.5 mi)	MPC · JPL
5620 Jasonwheeler	1990 OA	Jasonwheeler	July 19, 1990	Palomar	B. Roman, E. F. Helin	AMO +1 km (0.62 mi)	1.3 km (0.81 mi)	MPC · JPL
5621 Erb	1990 SG_{4}	Erb	September 23, 1990	Palomar	K. J. Lawrence	·	3.3 km (2.1 mi)	MPC · JPL
5622 Percyjulian	1990 TL_{4}	Percyjulian	October 14, 1990	Palomar	E. F. Helin	GEF	9.7 km (6.0 mi)	MPC · JPL
5623 Iwamori	1990 UY	Iwamori	October 20, 1990	Dynic	A. Sugie	EOS	14 km (8.7 mi)	MPC · JPL
5624 Shirley	1991 AY_{1}	Shirley	January 11, 1991	Palomar	E. F. Helin	·	20 km (12 mi)	MPC · JPL
5625 Jamesferguson	1991 AO_{2}	Jamesferguson	January 7, 1991	Siding Spring	R. H. McNaught	ADE	15 km (9.3 mi)	MPC · JPL
5626 Melissabrucker	1991 FE	Melissabrucker	March 18, 1991	Kitt Peak	Spacewatch	AMO +1 km (0.62 mi)	4.8 km (3.0 mi)	MPC · JPL
5627 Short	1991 MA	Short	June 16, 1991	Siding Spring	R. H. McNaught	H	2.7 km (1.7 mi)	MPC · JPL
5628 Preussen	1991 RP_{7}	Preussen	September 13, 1991	Tautenburg Observatory	L. D. Schmadel, F. Börngen	·	12 km (7.5 mi)	MPC · JPL
5629 Kuwana	1993 DA_{1}	Kuwana	February 20, 1993	Okutama	Hioki, T., Hayakawa, S.	EOS	14 km (8.7 mi)	MPC · JPL
5630 Billschaefer	1993 FZ	Billschaefer	March 21, 1993	Palomar	Child, J. B.	·	4.8 km (3.0 mi)	MPC · JPL
5631 Sekihokutouge	1993 FE_{1}	Sekihokutouge	March 20, 1993	Kitami	K. Endate, K. Watanabe	·	4.5 km (2.8 mi)	MPC · JPL
5632 Ingelehmann	1993 GG	Ingelehmann	April 15, 1993	Palomar	C. S. Shoemaker, E. M. Shoemaker	·	13 km (8.1 mi)	MPC · JPL
5633	1978 UL_{7}	—	October 27, 1978	Palomar	C. M. Olmstead	·	4.5 km (2.8 mi)	MPC · JPL
5634 Victorborge	1978 VT_{6}	Victorborge	November 7, 1978	Palomar	E. F. Helin, S. J. Bus	·	4.0 km (2.5 mi)	MPC · JPL
5635 Cole	1981 ER_{5}	Cole	March 2, 1981	Siding Spring	S. J. Bus	·	3.5 km (2.2 mi)	MPC · JPL
5636 Jacobson	1985 QN	Jacobson	August 22, 1985	Anderson Mesa	E. Bowell	·	7.8 km (4.8 mi)	MPC · JPL
5637 Gyas	1988 RF_{1}	Gyas	September 10, 1988	Palomar	C. S. Shoemaker, E. M. Shoemaker	L5	28 km (17 mi)	MPC · JPL
5638 Deikoon	1988 TA_{3}	Deikoon	October 10, 1988	Palomar	C. S. Shoemaker, E. M. Shoemaker	L5	41 km (25 mi)	MPC · JPL
5639 Ćuk	1989 PE	Ćuk	August 9, 1989	Palomar	J. Alu, E. F. Helin	H	3.4 km (2.1 mi)	MPC · JPL
5640 Yoshino	1989 UR_{3}	Yoshino	October 21, 1989	Kagoshima	M. Mukai, Takeishi, M.	·	5.8 km (3.6 mi)	MPC · JPL
5641 McCleese	1990 DJ	McCleese	February 27, 1990	Palomar	E. F. Helin	H · slow	5.7 km (3.5 mi)	MPC · JPL
5642 Bobbywilliams	1990 OK_{1}	Bobbywilliams	July 27, 1990	Palomar	H. E. Holt	·	3.2 km (2.0 mi)	MPC · JPL
5643 Roques	1990 QC_{2}	Roques	August 22, 1990	Palomar	H. E. Holt	·	3.5 km (2.2 mi)	MPC · JPL
5644 Maureenbell	1990 QG_{2}	Maureenbell	August 22, 1990	Palomar	H. E. Holt	slow	16 km (9.9 mi)	MPC · JPL
5645	1990 SP	—	September 20, 1990	Siding Spring	R. H. McNaught	APO +1 km (0.62 mi)	1.7 km (1.1 mi)	MPC · JPL
5646	1990 TR	—	October 11, 1990	Kushiro	S. Ueda, H. Kaneda	AMO +1 km (0.62 mi) · moon	4.3 km (2.7 mi)	MPC · JPL
5647 Sarojininaidu	1990 TZ	Sarojininaidu	October 14, 1990	Palomar	E. F. Helin	·	8.6 km (5.3 mi)	MPC · JPL
5648 Axius	1990 VU_{1}	Axius	November 11, 1990	Kitami	K. Endate, K. Watanabe	L5	59 km (37 mi)	MPC · JPL
5649 Donnashirley	1990 WZ_{2}	Donnashirley	November 18, 1990	Palomar	E. F. Helin	·	2.6 km (1.6 mi)	MPC · JPL
5650 Mochihito-o	1990 XK	Mochihito-o	December 10, 1990	Yakiimo	Natori, A., T. Urata	EUN	11 km (6.8 mi)	MPC · JPL
5651 Traversa	1991 CA_{2}	Traversa	February 14, 1991	Haute-Provence	E. W. Elst	(5651)	27 km (17 mi)	MPC · JPL
5652 Amphimachus	1992 HS_{3}	Amphimachus	April 24, 1992	Palomar	C. S. Shoemaker, E. M. Shoemaker	L4	54 km (34 mi)	MPC · JPL
5653 Camarillo	1992 WD_{5}	Camarillo	November 21, 1992	Palomar	E. F. Helin, K. J. Lawrence	AMO +1 km (0.62 mi)	1.5 km (0.93 mi)	MPC · JPL
5654 Terni	1993 KG	Terni	May 20, 1993	Stroncone	A. Vagnozzi	·	19 km (12 mi)	MPC · JPL
5655 Barney	1159 T-2	Barney	September 29, 1973	Palomar	C. J. van Houten, I. van Houten-Groeneveld, T. Gehrels	MAR	6.6 km (4.1 mi)	MPC · JPL
5656 Oldfield	A920 TA	Oldfield	October 8, 1920	Hamburg-Bergedorf	W. Baade	·	7.7 km (4.8 mi)	MPC · JPL
5657 Groombridge	1936 QE_{1}	Groombridge	August 28, 1936	Heidelberg	K. Reinmuth	EUN	7.4 km (4.6 mi)	MPC · JPL
5658 Clausbaader	1950 DO	Clausbaader	February 17, 1950	Heidelberg	K. Reinmuth	·	12 km (7.5 mi)	MPC · JPL
5659 Vergara	1968 OA_{1}	Vergara	July 18, 1968	Cerro El Roble	C. Torres, Cofre, S.	V	2.2 km (1.4 mi)	MPC · JPL
5660	1974 MA	—	June 26, 1974	Palomar	C. T. Kowal	APO +1 km (0.62 mi)	3.0 km (1.9 mi)	MPC · JPL
5661 Hildebrand	1977 PO_{1}	Hildebrand	August 14, 1977	Nauchnij	N. S. Chernykh	T_{j} (2.96) · 3:2	34 km (21 mi)	MPC · JPL
5662 Wendycalvin	1981 EL_{4}	Wendycalvin	March 2, 1981	Siding Spring	S. J. Bus	EOS	9.4 km (5.8 mi)	MPC · JPL
5663 McKeegan	1981 EQ_{12}	McKeegan	March 1, 1981	Siding Spring	S. J. Bus	·	5.5 km (3.4 mi)	MPC · JPL
5664 Eugster	1981 EX_{43}	Eugster	March 6, 1981	Siding Spring	S. J. Bus	V	2.5 km (1.6 mi)	MPC · JPL
5665 Begemann	1982 BD_{13}	Begemann	January 30, 1982	Palomar	S. J. Bus	·	3.6 km (2.2 mi)	MPC · JPL
5666 Rabelais	1982 TP_{1}	Rabelais	October 14, 1982	Nauchnij	L. G. Karachkina	·	12 km (7.5 mi)	MPC · JPL
5667 Nakhimovskaya	1983 QH_{1}	Nakhimovskaya	August 16, 1983	Nauchnij	T. M. Smirnova	·	4.7 km (2.9 mi)	MPC · JPL
5668 Foucault	1984 FU	Foucault	March 22, 1984	Kleť	A. Mrkos	·	5.1 km (3.2 mi)	MPC · JPL
5669	1985 CC_{2}	—	February 12, 1985	La Silla	H. Debehogne	·	6.1 km (3.8 mi)	MPC · JPL
5670 Rosstaylor	1985 VF_{2}	Rosstaylor	November 7, 1985	Palomar	C. S. Shoemaker, E. M. Shoemaker	·	30 km (19 mi)	MPC · JPL
5671 Chanal	1985 XR	Chanal	December 13, 1985	Caussols	CERGA	·	8.2 km (5.1 mi)	MPC · JPL
5672 Libby	1986 EE_{2}	Libby	March 6, 1986	Anderson Mesa	E. Bowell	slow	6.6 km (4.1 mi)	MPC · JPL
5673 McAllister	1986 RT_{2}	McAllister	September 6, 1986	Anderson Mesa	E. Bowell	·	5.3 km (3.3 mi)	MPC · JPL
5674 Wolff	1986 RW_{2}	Wolff	September 6, 1986	Anderson Mesa	E. Bowell	moon	6.0 km (3.7 mi)	MPC · JPL
5675 Evgenilebedev	1986 RY_{5}	Evgenilebedev	September 7, 1986	Nauchnij	L. I. Chernykh	V	4.1 km (2.5 mi)	MPC · JPL
5676 Voltaire	1986 RH_{12}	Voltaire	September 9, 1986	Nauchnij	L. G. Karachkina	PHO	10 km (6.2 mi)	MPC · JPL
5677 Aberdonia	1987 SQ_{1}	Aberdonia	September 21, 1987	Anderson Mesa	E. Bowell	KOR	8.8 km (5.5 mi)	MPC · JPL
5678 DuBridge	1989 TS	DuBridge	October 1, 1989	Palomar	E. F. Helin	·	5.9 km (3.7 mi)	MPC · JPL
5679 Akkado	1989 VR	Akkado	November 2, 1989	Kitami	K. Endate, K. Watanabe	KOR	6.3 km (3.9 mi)	MPC · JPL
5680 Nasmyth	1989 YZ_{1}	Nasmyth	December 30, 1989	Siding Spring	R. H. McNaught	THM	10 km (6.2 mi)	MPC · JPL
5681 Bakulev	1990 RS_{17}	Bakulev	September 15, 1990	Nauchnij	L. V. Zhuravleva	·	4.8 km (3.0 mi)	MPC · JPL
5682 Beresford	1990 TB	Beresford	October 9, 1990	Siding Spring	R. H. McNaught	·	4.1 km (2.5 mi)	MPC · JPL
5683 Bifukumonin	1990 UD	Bifukumonin	October 19, 1990	Oohira	T. Urata	·	4.3 km (2.7 mi)	MPC · JPL
5684 Kogo	1990 UB_{2}	Kogo	October 21, 1990	Oohira	T. Urata	·	4.0 km (2.5 mi)	MPC · JPL
5685 Sanenobufukui	1990 XA	Sanenobufukui	December 8, 1990	Minami-Oda	T. Nomura, K. Kawanishi	GEF	13 km (8.1 mi)	MPC · JPL
5686 Chiyonoura	1990 YQ	Chiyonoura	December 20, 1990	Kushiro	Matsuyama, M., K. Watanabe	NYS	3.9 km (2.4 mi)	MPC · JPL
5687 Yamamotoshinobu	1991 AB_{1}	Yamamotoshinobu	January 13, 1991	Yatsugatake	Y. Kushida, O. Muramatsu	slow	14 km (8.7 mi)	MPC · JPL
5688 Kleewyck	1991 AD_{2}	Kleewyck	January 12, 1991	Palomar	E. F. Helin	·	8.1 km (5.0 mi)	MPC · JPL
5689 Rhön	1991 RZ_{2}	Rhön	September 9, 1991	Tautenburg Observatory	F. Börngen, L. D. Schmadel	·	8.7 km (5.4 mi)	MPC · JPL
5690	1992 EU	—	March 7, 1992	Kushiro	S. Ueda, H. Kaneda	·	5.8 km (3.6 mi)	MPC · JPL
5691 Fredwatson	1992 FD	Fredwatson	March 26, 1992	Siding Spring	R. H. McNaught	PHO · slow	5.5 km (3.4 mi)	MPC · JPL
5692 Shirao	1992 FR	Shirao	March 23, 1992	Kitami	K. Endate, K. Watanabe	·	9.5 km (5.9 mi)	MPC · JPL
5693	1993 EA	—	March 3, 1993	Kitt Peak	Spacewatch	APO +1 km (0.62 mi) · PHA	1.6 km (0.99 mi)	MPC · JPL
5694 Berényi	3051 P-L	Berényi	September 24, 1960	Palomar	C. J. van Houten, I. van Houten-Groeneveld, T. Gehrels	EUN	6.3 km (3.9 mi)	MPC · JPL
5695 Remillieux	4577 P-L	Remillieux	September 24, 1960	Palomar	C. J. van Houten, I. van Houten-Groeneveld, T. Gehrels	EUN	7.1 km (4.4 mi)	MPC · JPL
5696 Ibsen	4582 P-L	Ibsen	September 24, 1960	Palomar	C. J. van Houten, I. van Houten-Groeneveld, T. Gehrels	·	10 km (6.2 mi)	MPC · JPL
5697 Arrhenius	6766 P-L	Arrhenius	September 24, 1960	Palomar	C. J. van Houten, I. van Houten-Groeneveld, T. Gehrels	·	17 km (11 mi)	MPC · JPL
5698 Nolde	4121 T-1	Nolde	March 26, 1971	Palomar	C. J. van Houten, I. van Houten-Groeneveld, T. Gehrels	THM	17 km (11 mi)	MPC · JPL
5699 Munch	2141 T-3	Munch	October 16, 1977	Palomar	C. J. van Houten, I. van Houten-Groeneveld, T. Gehrels	·	4.3 km (2.7 mi)	MPC · JPL
5700 Homerus	5166 T-3	Homerus	October 16, 1977	Palomar	C. J. van Houten, I. van Houten-Groeneveld, T. Gehrels	EUN	5.8 km (3.6 mi)	MPC · JPL

== 5701–5800 ==
back to top

Designation			Discovery			Properties		Ref
Permanent	Provisional	Named after	Date	Site	Discoverer(s)	Category	Diam.	Ref
5701 Baltuck	1929 VS	Baltuck	November 3, 1929	Flagstaff	C. W. Tombaugh	·	8.6 km (5.3 mi)	MPC · JPL
5702 Morando	1931 FC	Morando	March 16, 1931	Heidelberg	M. F. Wolf	·	5.1 km (3.2 mi)	MPC · JPL
5703 Hevelius	1931 VS	Hevelius	November 15, 1931	Heidelberg	K. Reinmuth	EUN	5.9 km (3.7 mi)	MPC · JPL
5704 Schumacher	1950 DE	Schumacher	February 17, 1950	Heidelberg	K. Reinmuth	·	24 km (15 mi)	MPC · JPL
5705 Ericsterken	1965 UA	Ericsterken	October 21, 1965	Uccle	H. Debehogne	·	4.5 km (2.8 mi)	MPC · JPL
5706 Finkelstein	1971 SS_{1}	Finkelstein	September 23, 1971	Nauchnij	Crimean Astrophysical Observatory	THM	14 km (8.7 mi)	MPC · JPL
5707 Shevchenko	1976 GY_{3}	Shevchenko	April 2, 1976	Nauchnij	N. S. Chernykh	·	5.7 km (3.5 mi)	MPC · JPL
5708 Melancholia	1977 TC_{1}	Melancholia	October 12, 1977	Zimmerwald	P. Wild	·	3.6 km (2.2 mi)	MPC · JPL
5709 Tamyeunleung	1977 TS_{3}	Tamyeunleung	October 12, 1977	Nanking	Purple Mountain	·	18 km (11 mi)	MPC · JPL
5710 Silentium	1977 UP	Silentium	October 18, 1977	Zimmerwald	P. Wild	·	4.3 km (2.7 mi)	MPC · JPL
5711 Eneev	1978 SO_{4}	Eneev	September 27, 1978	Nauchnij	L. I. Chernykh	3:2 · slow	39 km (24 mi)	MPC · JPL
5712 Funke	1979 SR	Funke	September 25, 1979	Kleť	A. Mrkos	GEF	7.2 km (4.5 mi)	MPC · JPL
5713	1982 FF_{3}	—	March 21, 1982	La Silla	H. Debehogne	·	3.9 km (2.4 mi)	MPC · JPL
5714 Krasinsky	1982 PR	Krasinsky	August 14, 1982	Nauchnij	N. S. Chernykh	THM	20 km (12 mi)	MPC · JPL
5715 Kramer	1982 SE_{1}	Kramer	September 22, 1982	Anderson Mesa	E. Bowell	HYG	16 km (9.9 mi)	MPC · JPL
5716 Pickard	1982 UH	Pickard	October 17, 1982	Anderson Mesa	E. Bowell	·	9.1 km (5.7 mi)	MPC · JPL
5717 Damir	1982 UM_{6}	Damir	October 20, 1982	Nauchnij	L. G. Karachkina	NYS	5.8 km (3.6 mi)	MPC · JPL
5718 Roykerr	1983 PB	Roykerr	August 4, 1983	Lake Tekapo	A. C. Gilmore, P. M. Kilmartin	·	2.6 km (1.6 mi)	MPC · JPL
5719 Křižík	1983 RX	Křižík	September 7, 1983	Kleť	A. Mrkos	·	5.5 km (3.4 mi)	MPC · JPL
5720 Halweaver	1984 FN	Halweaver	March 29, 1984	Palomar	C. S. Shoemaker, E. M. Shoemaker	·	4.3 km (2.7 mi)	MPC · JPL
5721	1984 SO_{5}	—	September 18, 1984	La Silla	H. Debehogne	·	8.5 km (5.3 mi)	MPC · JPL
5722 Johnscherrer	1986 JS	Johnscherrer	May 2, 1986	Palomar	INAS	·	4.0 km (2.5 mi)	MPC · JPL
5723 Hudson	1986 RR_{2}	Hudson	September 6, 1986	Anderson Mesa	E. Bowell	·	2.9 km (1.8 mi)	MPC · JPL
5724	1986 WE	—	November 22, 1986	Toyota	K. Suzuki, T. Urata	·	5.7 km (3.5 mi)	MPC · JPL
5725 Nördlingen	1988 BK_{2}	Nördlingen	January 23, 1988	Palomar	C. S. Shoemaker, E. M. Shoemaker	HNS	7.6 km (4.7 mi)	MPC · JPL
5726 Rubin	1988 BN_{2}	Rubin	January 24, 1988	Palomar	C. S. Shoemaker, E. M. Shoemaker	PHO	5.2 km (3.2 mi)	MPC · JPL
5727 Pierobenvenuti	1988 BB_{4}	Pierobenvenuti	January 19, 1988	La Silla	H. Debehogne	·	4.2 km (2.6 mi)	MPC · JPL
5728 Umbertobenvenuti	1988 BJ_{4}	Umbertobenvenuti	January 20, 1988	La Silla	H. Debehogne	·	4.5 km (2.8 mi)	MPC · JPL
5729	1988 TA_{1}	—	October 13, 1988	Kushiro	S. Ueda, H. Kaneda	EOS	13 km (8.1 mi)	MPC · JPL
5730 Yonosuke	1988 TP_{1}	Yonosuke	October 13, 1988	Gekko	Y. Oshima	·	8.2 km (5.1 mi)	MPC · JPL
5731 Zeus	1988 VP_{4}	Zeus	November 4, 1988	Palomar	C. S. Shoemaker, E. M. Shoemaker	APO +1 km (0.62 mi)	5.2 km (3.2 mi)	MPC · JPL
5732	1988 WC	—	November 29, 1988	Yorii	M. Arai, H. Mori	·	3.3 km (2.1 mi)	MPC · JPL
5733	1989 AQ	—	January 4, 1989	Kushiro	S. Ueda, H. Kaneda	THM · slow	21 km (13 mi)	MPC · JPL
5734 Noguchi	1989 AL_{1}	Noguchi	January 15, 1989	Kitami	K. Endate, K. Watanabe	V	3.7 km (2.3 mi)	MPC · JPL
5735 Loripaul	1989 LM	Loripaul	June 4, 1989	Palomar	E. F. Helin	·	4.0 km (2.5 mi)	MPC · JPL
5736 Sanford	1989 LW	Sanford	June 6, 1989	Palomar	E. F. Helin	PHO	5.1 km (3.2 mi)	MPC · JPL
5737 Itoh	1989 SK	Itoh	September 30, 1989	Minami-Oda	T. Nomura, K. Kawanishi	·	5.4 km (3.4 mi)	MPC · JPL
5738 Billpickering	1989 UY_{3}	Billpickering	October 27, 1989	Palomar	E. F. Helin	·	4.3 km (2.7 mi)	MPC · JPL
5739 Robertburns	1989 WK_{2}	Robertburns	November 24, 1989	Siding Spring	R. H. McNaught	·	5.7 km (3.5 mi)	MPC · JPL
5740 Toutoumi	1989 WM_{3}	Toutoumi	November 29, 1989	Gekko	Y. Oshima	·	8.9 km (5.5 mi)	MPC · JPL
5741 Akanemaruta	1989 XC	Akanemaruta	December 2, 1989	Oohira	Oohira	·	8.5 km (5.3 mi)	MPC · JPL
5742	1990 TN_{4}	—	October 9, 1990	Siding Spring	R. H. McNaught	·	17 km (11 mi)	MPC · JPL
5743 Kato	1990 UW	Kato	October 19, 1990	Susono	M. Akiyama, T. Furuta	·	5.3 km (3.3 mi)	MPC · JPL
5744 Yorimasa	1990 XP	Yorimasa	December 14, 1990	Yakiimo	Natori, A., T. Urata	(883)	4.0 km (2.5 mi)	MPC · JPL
5745	1991 AN	—	January 9, 1991	Okutama	Hioki, T., Hayakawa, S.	·	4.4 km (2.7 mi)	MPC · JPL
5746	1991 CK	—	February 5, 1991	Yorii	M. Arai, H. Mori	·	7.1 km (4.4 mi)	MPC · JPL
5747 Williamina	1991 CO_{3}	Williamina	February 10, 1991	Siding Spring	R. H. McNaught	PHO · slow	9.3 km (5.8 mi)	MPC · JPL
5748 Davebrin	1991 DX	Davebrin	February 19, 1991	Palomar	E. F. Helin	EUN	4.7 km (2.9 mi)	MPC · JPL
5749 Urduja	1991 FV	Urduja	March 17, 1991	Palomar	E. F. Helin	EOS	13 km (8.1 mi)	MPC · JPL
5750 Kandatai	1991 GG_{1}	Kandatai	April 11, 1991	Kitami	A. Takahashi, K. Watanabe	EOS	13 km (8.1 mi)	MPC · JPL
5751 Zao	1992 AC	Zao	January 5, 1992	Ayashi Station	M. Koishikawa	AMO +1 km (0.62 mi)	2.3 km (1.4 mi)	MPC · JPL
5752	1992 CJ	—	February 10, 1992	Uenohara	N. Kawasato	·	4.8 km (3.0 mi)	MPC · JPL
5753 Yoshidatadahiko	1992 EM	Yoshidatadahiko	March 4, 1992	Kitami	K. Endate, K. Watanabe	·	5.8 km (3.6 mi)	MPC · JPL
5754	1992 FR_{2}	—	March 24, 1992	Kushiro	S. Ueda, H. Kaneda	·	6.3 km (3.9 mi)	MPC · JPL
5755	1992 OP_{7}	—	July 20, 1992	La Silla	H. Debehogne, Á. López-G.	EOS	15 km (9.3 mi)	MPC · JPL
5756 Wassenbergh	6034 P-L	Wassenbergh	September 24, 1960	Palomar	C. J. van Houten, I. van Houten-Groeneveld, T. Gehrels	·	3.9 km (2.4 mi)	MPC · JPL
5757 Tichá	1967 JN	Tichá	May 6, 1967	El Leoncito	C. U. Cesco, A. R. Klemola	·	21 km (13 mi)	MPC · JPL
5758 Brunini	1976 QZ_{1}	Brunini	August 20, 1976	El Leoncito	Félix Aguilar Observatory	·	4.4 km (2.7 mi)	MPC · JPL
5759 Zoshchenko	1980 BJ_{4}	Zoshchenko	January 22, 1980	Nauchnij	L. G. Karachkina	KOR	7.0 km (4.3 mi)	MPC · JPL
5760 Mittlefehldt	1981 EX_{13}	Mittlefehldt	March 1, 1981	Siding Spring	S. J. Bus	EOS	11 km (6.8 mi)	MPC · JPL
5761 Andreivanov	1981 ED_{21}	Andreivanov	March 2, 1981	Siding Spring	S. J. Bus	·	7.4 km (4.6 mi)	MPC · JPL
5762 Wänke	1981 EG_{28}	Wänke	March 2, 1981	Siding Spring	S. J. Bus	·	4.0 km (2.5 mi)	MPC · JPL
5763 Williamtobin	1982 MA	Williamtobin	June 23, 1982	Lake Tekapo	A. C. Gilmore, P. M. Kilmartin	·	4.2 km (2.6 mi)	MPC · JPL
5764	1985 CS_{1}	—	February 10, 1985	La Silla	H. Debehogne	·	5.2 km (3.2 mi)	MPC · JPL
5765 Izett	1986 GU	Izett	April 4, 1986	Palomar	C. S. Shoemaker, E. M. Shoemaker	BAR	9.0 km (5.6 mi)	MPC · JPL
5766 Carmelofalco	1986 QR_{3}	Carmelofalco	August 29, 1986	La Silla	H. Debehogne	·	4.8 km (3.0 mi)	MPC · JPL
5767 Moldun	1986 RV_{2}	Moldun	September 6, 1986	Anderson Mesa	E. Bowell	·	4.1 km (2.5 mi)	MPC · JPL
5768 Pittich	1986 TN_{1}	Pittich	October 4, 1986	Anderson Mesa	E. Bowell	·	10 km (6.2 mi)	MPC · JPL
5769 Michard	1987 PL	Michard	August 6, 1987	Caussols	CERGA	EOS	12 km (7.5 mi)	MPC · JPL
5770 Aricam	1987 RY	Aricam	September 12, 1987	La Silla	H. Debehogne	THM	14 km (8.7 mi)	MPC · JPL
5771 Somerville	1987 ST_{1}	Somerville	September 21, 1987	Anderson Mesa	E. Bowell	·	28 km (17 mi)	MPC · JPL
5772 Johnlambert	1988 LB	Johnlambert	June 15, 1988	Palomar	E. F. Helin	EUN · moon	7.4 km (4.6 mi)	MPC · JPL
5773 Hopper	1989 NO	Hopper	July 2, 1989	Palomar	E. F. Helin	slow	4.6 km (2.9 mi)	MPC · JPL
5774 Ratliff	1989 NR	Ratliff	July 2, 1989	Palomar	E. F. Helin	·	4.1 km (2.5 mi)	MPC · JPL
5775 Inuyama	1989 SP	Inuyama	September 29, 1989	Kani	Y. Mizuno, T. Furuta	·	7.4 km (4.6 mi)	MPC · JPL
5776	1989 UT_{2}	—	October 29, 1989	Okutama	Hioki, T., N. Kawasato	EUN	7.5 km (4.7 mi)	MPC · JPL
5777 Hanaki	1989 XF	Hanaki	December 3, 1989	Kani	Y. Mizuno, T. Furuta	RAF	7.6 km (4.7 mi)	MPC · JPL
5778 Jurafrance	1989 YF_{5}	Jurafrance	December 28, 1989	Haute-Provence	E. W. Elst	MAR	10 km (6.2 mi)	MPC · JPL
5779 Schupmann	1990 BC_{1}	Schupmann	January 23, 1990	Kushiro	S. Ueda, H. Kaneda	EOS	11 km (6.8 mi)	MPC · JPL
5780 Lafontaine	1990 EJ_{2}	Lafontaine	March 2, 1990	La Silla	E. W. Elst	CYB	23 km (14 mi)	MPC · JPL
5781 Barkhatova	1990 SM_{28}	Barkhatova	September 24, 1990	Nauchnij	G. R. Kastelʹ, L. V. Zhuravleva	moon	5.7 km (3.5 mi)	MPC · JPL
5782 Akirafujiwara	1991 AF	Akirafujiwara	January 7, 1991	Siding Spring	R. H. McNaught	·	4.7 km (2.9 mi)	MPC · JPL
5783 Kumagaya	1991 CO	Kumagaya	February 5, 1991	Okutama	Hioki, T., Hayakawa, S.	·	5.8 km (3.6 mi)	MPC · JPL
5784 Yoron	1991 CY	Yoron	February 9, 1991	Yakiimo	Natori, A., T. Urata	·	6.8 km (4.2 mi)	MPC · JPL
5785 Fulton	1991 FU	Fulton	March 17, 1991	Palomar	E. F. Helin	EUN	7.8 km (4.8 mi)	MPC · JPL
5786 Talos	1991 RC	Talos	September 3, 1991	Siding Spring	R. H. McNaught	APO +1 km (0.62 mi)	1.3 km (0.81 mi)	MPC · JPL
5787	1992 FA_{1}	—	March 26, 1992	Kushiro	S. Ueda, H. Kaneda	·	5.4 km (3.4 mi)	MPC · JPL
5788	1992 NJ	—	July 1, 1992	Siding Spring	R. H. McNaught	·	18 km (11 mi)	MPC · JPL
5789 Sellin	4018 P-L	Sellin	September 24, 1960	Palomar	C. J. van Houten, I. van Houten-Groeneveld, T. Gehrels	(5)	5.1 km (3.2 mi)	MPC · JPL
5790 Nagasaki	9540 P-L	Nagasaki	October 17, 1960	Palomar	C. J. van Houten, I. van Houten-Groeneveld, T. Gehrels	(5)	5.7 km (3.5 mi)	MPC · JPL
5791 Comello	4053 T-2	Comello	September 29, 1973	Palomar	C. J. van Houten, I. van Houten-Groeneveld, T. Gehrels	KOR	7.6 km (4.7 mi)	MPC · JPL
5792 Unstrut	1964 BF	Unstrut	January 18, 1964	Tautenburg Observatory	F. Börngen	·	13 km (8.1 mi)	MPC · JPL
5793 Ringuelet	1975 TK_{6}	Ringuelet	October 5, 1975	El Leoncito	Félix Aguilar Observatory	·	8.1 km (5.0 mi)	MPC · JPL
5794 Irmina	1976 SW_{3}	Irmina	September 24, 1976	Nauchnij	N. S. Chernykh	HYG	11 km (6.8 mi)	MPC · JPL
5795 Roshchina	1978 SH_{1}	Roshchina	September 27, 1978	Nauchnij	L. I. Chernykh	·	4.9 km (3.0 mi)	MPC · JPL
5796 Klemm	1978 VK_{5}	Klemm	November 7, 1978	Palomar	E. F. Helin, S. J. Bus	·	5.7 km (3.5 mi)	MPC · JPL
5797 Bivoj	1980 AA	Bivoj	January 13, 1980	Kleť	A. Mrkos	AMO	400 m (1,300 ft)	MPC · JPL
5798 Burnett	1980 RL_{7}	Burnett	September 13, 1980	Palomar	S. J. Bus	·	8.6 km (5.3 mi)	MPC · JPL
5799 Brewington	1980 TG_{4}	Brewington	October 9, 1980	Palomar	C. S. Shoemaker	·	5.4 km (3.4 mi)	MPC · JPL
5800 Pollock	1982 UV_{1}	Pollock	October 16, 1982	Kleť	A. Mrkos	·	11 km (6.8 mi)	MPC · JPL

== 5801–5900 ==
back to top

Designation			Discovery			Properties		Ref
Permanent	Provisional	Named after	Date	Site	Discoverer(s)	Category	Diam.	Ref
5801 Vasarely	1984 BK	Vasarely	January 26, 1984	Kleť	A. Mrkos	·	13 km (8.1 mi)	MPC · JPL
5802 Casteldelpiano	1984 HL_{1}	Casteldelpiano	April 27, 1984	La Silla	V. Zappalà	·	4.9 km (3.0 mi)	MPC · JPL
5803 Ötzi	1984 OA	Ötzi	July 21, 1984	Kleť	A. Mrkos	·	16 km (9.9 mi)	MPC · JPL
5804 Bambinidipraga	1985 RL_{1}	Bambinidipraga	September 9, 1985	Kleť	A. Mrkos	·	6.0 km (3.7 mi)	MPC · JPL
5805 Glasgow	1985 YH	Glasgow	December 18, 1985	Anderson Mesa	E. Bowell	EUN	9.2 km (5.7 mi)	MPC · JPL
5806 Archieroy	1986 AG_{1}	Archieroy	January 11, 1986	Anderson Mesa	E. Bowell	H	6.8 km (4.2 mi)	MPC · JPL
5807 Mshatka	1986 QA_{4}	Mshatka	August 30, 1986	Nauchnij	L. I. Chernykh	slow	13 km (8.1 mi)	MPC · JPL
5808 Babelʹ	1987 QV_{10}	Babelʹ	August 27, 1987	Nauchnij	L. G. Karachkina	EOS	13 km (8.1 mi)	MPC · JPL
5809 Kulibin	1987 RG_{6}	Kulibin	September 4, 1987	Nauchnij	L. V. Zhuravleva	KOR	7.8 km (4.8 mi)	MPC · JPL
5810	1988 EN	—	March 10, 1988	Gekko	Y. Oshima	·	5.1 km (3.2 mi)	MPC · JPL
5811 Keck	1988 KC	Keck	May 19, 1988	Palomar	E. F. Helin	·	7.6 km (4.7 mi)	MPC · JPL
5812 Jayewinkler	1988 PJ_{1}	Jayewinkler	August 11, 1988	Siding Spring	Noymer, A. J.	MAR	7.0 km (4.3 mi)	MPC · JPL
5813 Eizaburo	1988 VL	Eizaburo	November 3, 1988	Chiyoda	T. Kojima	·	7.2 km (4.5 mi)	MPC · JPL
5814	1988 XW_{1}	—	December 11, 1988	Kushiro	S. Ueda, H. Kaneda	EOS	16 km (9.9 mi)	MPC · JPL
5815 Shinsengumi	1989 AH	Shinsengumi	January 3, 1989	Geisei	T. Seki	·	18 km (11 mi)	MPC · JPL
5816 Potsdam	1989 AO_{6}	Potsdam	January 11, 1989	Tautenburg Observatory	F. Börngen	EOS	9.8 km (6.1 mi)	MPC · JPL
5817 Robertfrazer	1989 RZ	Robertfrazer	September 5, 1989	Palomar	E. F. Helin	·	6.5 km (4.0 mi)	MPC · JPL
5818	1989 RC_{1}	—	September 5, 1989	Lake Tekapo	A. C. Gilmore, P. M. Kilmartin	·	9.1 km (5.7 mi)	MPC · JPL
5819 Lauretta	1989 UZ_{4}	Lauretta	October 29, 1989	Cerro Tololo	S. J. Bus	·	6.1 km (3.8 mi)	MPC · JPL
5820 Babelsberg	1989 UF_{7}	Babelsberg	October 23, 1989	Tautenburg Observatory	F. Börngen	slow	11 km (6.8 mi)	MPC · JPL
5821 Yukiomaeda	1989 VV	Yukiomaeda	November 4, 1989	Oohira	Oohira	·	6.9 km (4.3 mi)	MPC · JPL
5822 Masakichi	1989 WL	Masakichi	November 21, 1989	Okutama	Hioki, T., Hayakawa, S.	slow	7.6 km (4.7 mi)	MPC · JPL
5823 Oryo	1989 YH	Oryo	December 20, 1989	Geisei	T. Seki	GEF	8.7 km (5.4 mi)	MPC · JPL
5824 Inagaki	1989 YM	Inagaki	December 24, 1989	Geisei	T. Seki	EUN	9.8 km (6.1 mi)	MPC · JPL
5825 Rakuyou	1990 BR_{1}	Rakuyou	January 21, 1990	Dynic	A. Sugie	ADE ·	12 km (7.5 mi)	MPC · JPL
5826 Bradstreet	1990 DB	Bradstreet	February 16, 1990	Kushiro	S. Ueda, H. Kaneda	·	19 km (12 mi)	MPC · JPL
5827 Letunov	1990 VB_{15}	Letunov	November 15, 1990	Nauchnij	L. I. Chernykh	slow	5.2 km (3.2 mi)	MPC · JPL
5828	1991 AM	—	January 14, 1991	Kitt Peak	Spacewatch	APO +1 km (0.62 mi)	1.5 km (0.93 mi)	MPC · JPL
5829 Ishidagoro	1991 CT_{1}	Ishidagoro	February 11, 1991	Kiyosato	S. Otomo, O. Muramatsu	(883)	3.7 km (2.3 mi)	MPC · JPL
5830 Simohiro	1991 EG	Simohiro	March 9, 1991	Ojima	T. Niijima, T. Urata	·	3.0 km (1.9 mi)	MPC · JPL
5831 Dizzy	1991 JG	Dizzy	May 4, 1991	Kushiro	S. Ueda, H. Kaneda	ADE	16 km (9.9 mi)	MPC · JPL
5832 Martaprincipe	1991 LE_{1}	Martaprincipe	June 15, 1991	Palomar	E. F. Helin	·	24 km (15 mi)	MPC · JPL
5833 Peterson	1991 PQ	Peterson	August 5, 1991	Palomar	H. E. Holt	CYB	27 km (17 mi)	MPC · JPL
5834 Kasai	1992 SZ_{14}	Kasai	September 28, 1992	Kushiro	S. Ueda, H. Kaneda	·	12 km (7.5 mi)	MPC · JPL
5835 Mainfranken	1992 SP_{24}	Mainfranken	September 21, 1992	Tautenburg Observatory	F. Börngen	·	10 km (6.2 mi)	MPC · JPL
5836	1993 MF	—	June 22, 1993	Palomar	E. F. Helin, K. J. Lawrence	AMO +1 km (0.62 mi)	2.8 km (1.7 mi)	MPC · JPL
5837 Hedin	2548 P-L	Hedin	September 24, 1960	Palomar	C. J. van Houten, I. van Houten-Groeneveld, T. Gehrels	THM	12 km (7.5 mi)	MPC · JPL
5838 Hamsun	2170 T-2	Hamsun	September 29, 1973	Palomar	C. J. van Houten, I. van Houten-Groeneveld, T. Gehrels	·	4.9 km (3.0 mi)	MPC · JPL
5839 GOI	1974 SJ_{3}	GOI	September 21, 1974	Nauchnij	N. S. Chernykh	·	25 km (16 mi)	MPC · JPL
5840 Raybrown	1978 ON	Raybrown	July 28, 1978	Bickley	Perth Observatory	AGN	9.7 km (6.0 mi)	MPC · JPL
5841 Stone	1982 ST	Stone	September 19, 1982	Palomar	E. F. Helin	H	2.2 km (1.4 mi)	MPC · JPL
5842 Cancelli	1986 CV_{1}	Cancelli	February 8, 1986	La Silla	H. Debehogne	MAR · slow	5.6 km (3.5 mi)	MPC · JPL
5843	1986 UG	—	October 30, 1986	Toyota	K. Suzuki, T. Urata	·	3.4 km (2.1 mi)	MPC · JPL
5844 Chlupáč	1986 UQ	Chlupáč	October 28, 1986	Kleť	Z. Vávrová	·	4.3 km (2.7 mi)	MPC · JPL
5845 Davidbrewster	1988 QP	Davidbrewster	August 19, 1988	Siding Spring	R. H. McNaught	EOS	17 km (11 mi)	MPC · JPL
5846 Hessen	1989 AW_{6}	Hessen	January 11, 1989	Tautenburg Observatory	F. Börngen	·	3.7 km (2.3 mi)	MPC · JPL
5847 Wakiya	1989 YB	Wakiya	December 18, 1989	Kitami	K. Endate, K. Watanabe	(887)	7.9 km (4.9 mi)	MPC · JPL
5848 Harutoriko	1990 BZ_{1}	Harutoriko	January 30, 1990	Kushiro	Matsuyama, M., K. Watanabe	·	6.0 km (3.7 mi)	MPC · JPL
5849 Bhanji	1990 HF_{1}	Bhanji	April 27, 1990	Palomar	E. F. Helin	·	28 km (17 mi)	MPC · JPL
5850 Masaharu	1990 XM	Masaharu	December 8, 1990	Kitami	K. Endate, K. Watanabe	slow	3.3 km (2.1 mi)	MPC · JPL
5851 Inagawa	1991 DM_{1}	Inagawa	February 23, 1991	Karasuyama	S. Inoda, T. Urata	EUN · slow	9.8 km (6.1 mi)	MPC · JPL
5852 Nanette	1991 HO	Nanette	April 19, 1991	Palomar	C. S. Shoemaker, D. H. Levy	·	24 km (15 mi)	MPC · JPL
5853	1992 QG	—	August 26, 1992	Kushiro	S. Ueda, H. Kaneda	·	6.3 km (3.9 mi)	MPC · JPL
5854	1992 UP	—	October 19, 1992	Kushiro	S. Ueda, H. Kaneda	THM ·	18 km (11 mi)	MPC · JPL
5855 Yukitsuna	1992 UO_{2}	Yukitsuna	October 26, 1992	Yakiimo	Natori, A., T. Urata	MAR	11 km (6.8 mi)	MPC · JPL
5856 Peluk	1994 AL_{2}	Peluk	January 5, 1994	Kushiro	S. Ueda, H. Kaneda	MAR	6.2 km (3.9 mi)	MPC · JPL
5857 Neglinka	1975 TM_{2}	Neglinka	October 3, 1975	Nauchnij	L. I. Chernykh	·	4.3 km (2.7 mi)	MPC · JPL
5858 Borovitskia	1978 SU_{5}	Borovitskia	September 28, 1978	Nauchnij	L. I. Chernykh	V	5.6 km (3.5 mi)	MPC · JPL
5859 Ostozhenka	1979 FD_{2}	Ostozhenka	March 23, 1979	Nauchnij	N. S. Chernykh	NYS	6.0 km (3.7 mi)	MPC · JPL
5860 Deankoontz	1981 QE_{1}	Deankoontz	August 28, 1981	Kleť	Z. Vávrová	NYS	3.9 km (2.4 mi)	MPC · JPL
5861 Glynjones	1982 RW	Glynjones	September 15, 1982	Anderson Mesa	E. Bowell	·	3.9 km (2.4 mi)	MPC · JPL
5862 Sakanoue	1983 AB	Sakanoue	January 13, 1983	Geisei	T. Seki	NYS	4.0 km (2.5 mi)	MPC · JPL
5863 Tara	1983 RB	Tara	September 7, 1983	Palomar	C. S. Shoemaker, E. M. Shoemaker	AMO +1 km (0.62 mi)	1.3 km (0.81 mi)	MPC · JPL
5864 Montgolfier	1983 RC_{4}	Montgolfier	September 2, 1983	Anderson Mesa	N. G. Thomas	(887)	5.2 km (3.2 mi)	MPC · JPL
5865 Qualytemocrina	1984 QQ	Qualytemocrina	August 31, 1984	Kleť	A. Mrkos	·	6.0 km (3.7 mi)	MPC · JPL
5866 Sachsen	1988 PM_{2}	Sachsen	August 13, 1988	Tautenburg Observatory	F. Börngen	HOF	13 km (8.1 mi)	MPC · JPL
5867	1988 RE	—	September 11, 1988	Palomar	Phinney, J.	·	1.7 km (1.1 mi)	MPC · JPL
5868 Ohta	1988 TQ	Ohta	October 13, 1988	Kitami	K. Endate, K. Watanabe	·	8.4 km (5.2 mi)	MPC · JPL
5869 Tanith	1988 VN_{4}	Tanith	November 4, 1988	Palomar	C. S. Shoemaker	AMO +1 km (0.62 mi)	1.3 km (0.81 mi)	MPC · JPL
5870 Baltimore	1989 CC_{1}	Baltimore	February 11, 1989	Palomar	E. F. Helin	·	7.5 km (4.7 mi)	MPC · JPL
5871 Bobbell	1989 CE_{2}	Bobbell	February 11, 1989	Palomar	E. F. Helin	H	2.4 km (1.5 mi)	MPC · JPL
5872 Sugano	1989 SL	Sugano	September 30, 1989	Minami-Oda	T. Nomura, K. Kawanishi	moon	5.2 km (3.2 mi)	MPC · JPL
5873 Archilochos	1989 SB_{3}	Archilochos	September 26, 1989	La Silla	E. W. Elst	(254)	4.1 km (2.5 mi)	MPC · JPL
5874	1989 XB	—	December 2, 1989	Uenohara	N. Kawasato	·	4.2 km (2.6 mi)	MPC · JPL
5875 Kuga	1989 XO	Kuga	December 5, 1989	Kitami	K. Endate, K. Watanabe	·	7.5 km (4.7 mi)	MPC · JPL
5876	1990 DM_{2}	—	February 24, 1990	La Silla	H. Debehogne	AGN	7.1 km (4.4 mi)	MPC · JPL
5877 Toshimaihara	1990 FP	Toshimaihara	March 23, 1990	Palomar	E. F. Helin	·	6.6 km (4.1 mi)	MPC · JPL
5878 Charlene	1991 CC_{1}	Charlene	February 14, 1991	Palomar	E. F. Helin	·	6.4 km (4.0 mi)	MPC · JPL
5879 Almeria	1992 CH_{1}	Almeria	February 8, 1992	Calar Alto	K. Birkle, Hopp, U.	AMO +1 km (0.62 mi)	1.1 km (0.68 mi)	MPC · JPL
5880	1992 MA	—	June 22, 1992	Kushiro	S. Ueda, H. Kaneda	THM	14 km (8.7 mi)	MPC · JPL
5881 Akashi	1992 SR_{12}	Akashi	September 27, 1992	Minami-Oda	M. Sugano, T. Nomura	KOR	8.8 km (5.5 mi)	MPC · JPL
5882	1992 WW_{5}	—	November 18, 1992	Uenohara	N. Kawasato	KOR	5.6 km (3.5 mi)	MPC · JPL
5883 Josephblack	1993 VM_{5}	Josephblack	November 6, 1993	Siding Spring	R. H. McNaught	·	21 km (13 mi)	MPC · JPL
5884 Dolezal	6045 P-L	Dolezal	September 24, 1960	Palomar	C. J. van Houten, I. van Houten-Groeneveld, T. Gehrels	DOR	12 km (7.5 mi)	MPC · JPL
5885 Apeldoorn	3137 T-2	Apeldoorn	September 30, 1973	Palomar	C. J. van Houten, I. van Houten-Groeneveld, T. Gehrels	·	17 km (11 mi)	MPC · JPL
5886 Rutger	1975 LR	Rutger	June 13, 1975	El Leoncito	Félix Aguilar Observatory	EOS	17 km (11 mi)	MPC · JPL
5887 Yauza	1976 SG_{2}	Yauza	September 24, 1976	Nauchnij	N. S. Chernykh	·	5.4 km (3.4 mi)	MPC · JPL
5888 Ruders	1978 VU_{7}	Ruders	November 7, 1978	Palomar	E. F. Helin, S. J. Bus	KOR	8.0 km (5.0 mi)	MPC · JPL
5889 Mickiewicz	1979 FA_{3}	Mickiewicz	March 31, 1979	Nauchnij	N. S. Chernykh	·	26 km (16 mi)	MPC · JPL
5890 Carlsberg	1979 KG	Carlsberg	May 19, 1979	La Silla	R. M. West	EUN	8.1 km (5.0 mi)	MPC · JPL
5891 Gehrig	1981 SM	Gehrig	September 22, 1981	Kleť	A. Mrkos	·	5.5 km (3.4 mi)	MPC · JPL
5892 Milesdavis	1981 YS_{1}	Milesdavis	December 23, 1981	Nanking	Purple Mountain	·	3.7 km (2.3 mi)	MPC · JPL
5893 Coltrane	1982 EF	Coltrane	March 15, 1982	Kleť	Z. Vávrová	EUN	7.3 km (4.5 mi)	MPC · JPL
5894 Telč	1982 RM_{1}	Telč	September 14, 1982	Kleť	A. Mrkos	·	5.9 km (3.7 mi)	MPC · JPL
5895 Žbirka	1982 UF_{2}	Žbirka	October 16, 1982	Kleť	Z. Vávrová	·	4.0 km (2.5 mi)	MPC · JPL
5896 Narrenschiff	1982 VV_{10}	Narrenschiff	November 12, 1982	Nauchnij	L. G. Karachkina	·	4.8 km (3.0 mi)	MPC · JPL
5897 Novotná	1984 SZ_{1}	Novotná	September 29, 1984	Kleť	A. Mrkos	(5)	5.4 km (3.4 mi)	MPC · JPL
5898	1985 KE	—	May 23, 1985	Lake Tekapo	A. C. Gilmore, P. M. Kilmartin	·	14 km (8.7 mi)	MPC · JPL
5899 Jedicke	1986 AH	Jedicke	January 9, 1986	Palomar	C. S. Shoemaker, E. M. Shoemaker	H · moon	2.7 km (1.7 mi)	MPC · JPL
5900 Jensen	1986 TL	Jensen	October 3, 1986	Brorfelde	P. Jensen	LIX	20 km (12 mi)	MPC · JPL

== 5901–6000 ==
back to top

Designation			Discovery			Properties		Ref
Permanent	Provisional	Named after	Date	Site	Discoverer(s)	Category	Diam.	Ref
5901	1986 WB_{1}	—	November 25, 1986	Kleť	Z. Vávrová	·	4.0 km (2.5 mi)	MPC · JPL
5902 Talima	1987 QY_{10}	Talima	August 27, 1987	Nauchnij	L. G. Karachkina	EOS	13 km (8.1 mi)	MPC · JPL
5903	1989 AN_{1}	—	January 6, 1989	Kushiro	S. Ueda, H. Kaneda	slow	6.6 km (4.1 mi)	MPC · JPL
5904 Württemberg	1989 AE_{7}	Württemberg	January 10, 1989	Tautenburg Observatory	F. Börngen	·	9.8 km (6.1 mi)	MPC · JPL
5905 Johnson	1989 CJ_{1}	Johnson	February 11, 1989	Palomar	E. F. Helin	H · moon	4.7 km (2.9 mi)	MPC · JPL
5906	1989 SN_{5}	—	September 24, 1989	Lake Tekapo	A. C. Gilmore, P. M. Kilmartin	·	3.0 km (1.9 mi)	MPC · JPL
5907 Rhigmus	1989 TU_{5}	Rhigmus	October 2, 1989	Cerro Tololo	S. J. Bus	L5	31 km (19 mi)	MPC · JPL
5908 Aichi	1989 UF	Aichi	October 20, 1989	Kani	Y. Mizuno, T. Furuta	·	4.9 km (3.0 mi)	MPC · JPL
5909 Nagoya	1989 UT	Nagoya	October 23, 1989	Kani	Y. Mizuno, T. Furuta	·	5.1 km (3.2 mi)	MPC · JPL
5910 Zátopek	1989 WH_{4}	Zátopek	November 29, 1989	Kleť	A. Mrkos	·	4.3 km (2.7 mi)	MPC · JPL
5911	1989 WO_{7}	—	November 25, 1989	Kushiro	S. Ueda, H. Kaneda	·	3.8 km (2.4 mi)	MPC · JPL
5912 Oyatoshiyuki	1989 YR	Oyatoshiyuki	December 20, 1989	Ojima	T. Niijima, T. Urata	NYS	5.7 km (3.5 mi)	MPC · JPL
5913	1990 BU	—	January 21, 1990	Yorii	M. Arai, H. Mori	EUN	11 km (6.8 mi)	MPC · JPL
5914 Kathywhaler	1990 WK	Kathywhaler	November 20, 1990	Siding Spring	R. H. McNaught	SYL · CYB	38 km (24 mi)	MPC · JPL
5915 Yoshihiro	1991 EU	Yoshihiro	March 9, 1991	Geisei	T. Seki	·	3.8 km (2.4 mi)	MPC · JPL
5916 van der Woude	1991 JD_{1}	van der Woude	May 8, 1991	Palomar	E. F. Helin	·	8.2 km (5.1 mi)	MPC · JPL
5917 Chibasai	1991 NG	Chibasai	July 7, 1991	Palomar	E. F. Helin	MAR	10 km (6.2 mi)	MPC · JPL
5918	1991 NV_{3}	—	July 6, 1991	La Silla	H. Debehogne	KOR	7.6 km (4.7 mi)	MPC · JPL
5919 Patrickmartin	1991 PW_{12}	Patrickmartin	August 5, 1991	Palomar	H. E. Holt	THM ·	20 km (12 mi)	MPC · JPL
5920 Davidbell	1992 SX_{17}	Davidbell	September 30, 1992	Palomar	H. E. Holt	·	17 km (11 mi)	MPC · JPL
5921	1992 UL	—	October 19, 1992	Kushiro	S. Ueda, H. Kaneda	·	4.2 km (2.6 mi)	MPC · JPL
5922 Shouichi	1992 UV	Shouichi	October 21, 1992	Kiyosato	S. Otomo	TEL	29 km (18 mi)	MPC · JPL
5923 Liedeke	1992 WC_{8}	Liedeke	November 26, 1992	Kitt Peak	Spacewatch	KOR	8.1 km (5.0 mi)	MPC · JPL
5924 Teruo	1994 CH_{1}	Teruo	February 7, 1994	Oizumi	T. Kobayashi	·	14 km (8.7 mi)	MPC · JPL
5925	1994 CP_{1}	—	February 5, 1994	Kushiro	S. Ueda, H. Kaneda	·	6.1 km (3.8 mi)	MPC · JPL
5926 Schönfeld	1929 PB	Schönfeld	August 4, 1929	Heidelberg	M. F. Wolf	·	4.4 km (2.7 mi)	MPC · JPL
5927 Krogh	1938 HA	Krogh	April 19, 1938	Hamburg-Bergedorf	W. Dieckvoss	·	16 km (9.9 mi)	MPC · JPL
5928 Pindarus	1973 SK_{1}	Pindarus	September 19, 1973	Palomar	C. J. van Houten, I. van Houten-Groeneveld, T. Gehrels	HIL · 3:2 · slow	30 km (19 mi)	MPC · JPL
5929 Manzano	1974 XT	Manzano	December 14, 1974	El Leoncito	Félix Aguilar Observatory	·	4.2 km (2.6 mi)	MPC · JPL
5930 Zhiganov	1975 VW_{2}	Zhiganov	November 2, 1975	Nauchnij	T. M. Smirnova	·	4.9 km (3.0 mi)	MPC · JPL
5931 Zhvanetskij	1976 GK_{3}	Zhvanetskij	April 1, 1976	Nauchnij	N. S. Chernykh	(5931)	21 km (13 mi)	MPC · JPL
5932 Prutkov	1976 GO_{3}	Prutkov	April 1, 1976	Nauchnij	N. S. Chernykh	slow	5.9 km (3.7 mi)	MPC · JPL
5933 Kemurdzhian	1976 QN	Kemurdzhian	August 26, 1976	Nauchnij	N. S. Chernykh	·	3.6 km (2.2 mi)	MPC · JPL
5934 Mats	1976 SJ	Mats	September 20, 1976	Kvistaberg	C.-I. Lagerkvist, Rickman, H.	NYS	4.0 km (2.5 mi)	MPC · JPL
5935 Ostankino	1977 EF_{1}	Ostankino	March 13, 1977	Nauchnij	N. S. Chernykh	EUN	6.9 km (4.3 mi)	MPC · JPL
5936 Khadzhinov	1979 FQ_{2}	Khadzhinov	March 29, 1979	Nauchnij	N. S. Chernykh	EOS	13 km (8.1 mi)	MPC · JPL
5937 Lodén	1979 XQ	Lodén	December 11, 1979	Kvistaberg	C.-I. Lagerkvist	·	5.2 km (3.2 mi)	MPC · JPL
5938 Keller	1980 FH_{2}	Keller	March 16, 1980	La Silla	C.-I. Lagerkvist	·	5.5 km (3.4 mi)	MPC · JPL
5939 Toshimayeda	1981 EU_{8}	Toshimayeda	March 1, 1981	Siding Spring	S. J. Bus	·	6.0 km (3.7 mi)	MPC · JPL
5940 Feliksobolev	1981 TJ_{4}	Feliksobolev	October 8, 1981	Nauchnij	L. I. Chernykh	EOS	12 km (7.5 mi)	MPC · JPL
5941 Valencia	1982 UQ_{6}	Valencia	October 20, 1982	Nauchnij	L. G. Karachkina	KOR	8.2 km (5.1 mi)	MPC · JPL
5942 Denzilrobert	1983 AN_{2}	Denzilrobert	January 10, 1983	Palomar	Behymer, B. E., Marley, M. S.	EOS	14 km (8.7 mi)	MPC · JPL
5943 Lovi	1984 EG	Lovi	March 1, 1984	Anderson Mesa	E. Bowell	(883)	4.3 km (2.7 mi)	MPC · JPL
5944 Utesov	1984 JA_{2}	Utesov	May 2, 1984	Nauchnij	L. G. Karachkina	EOS	14 km (8.7 mi)	MPC · JPL
5945 Roachapproach	1984 SQ_{3}	Roachapproach	September 28, 1984	Anderson Mesa	B. A. Skiff	·	6.5 km (4.0 mi)	MPC · JPL
5946 Hrozný	1984 UC_{1}	Hrozný	October 28, 1984	Kleť	A. Mrkos	·	8.4 km (5.2 mi)	MPC · JPL
5947 Bonnie	1985 FD	Bonnie	March 21, 1985	Palomar	C. S. Shoemaker, E. M. Shoemaker	·	11 km (6.8 mi)	MPC · JPL
5948 Longo	1985 JL	Longo	May 15, 1985	Anderson Mesa	E. Bowell	CLO	10 km (6.2 mi)	MPC · JPL
5949	1985 RL_{3}	—	September 6, 1985	La Silla	H. Debehogne	·	5.9 km (3.7 mi)	MPC · JPL
5950 Leukippos	1986 PS_{4}	Leukippos	August 9, 1986	Smolyan	E. W. Elst, V. G. Ivanova	EOS	10 km (6.2 mi)	MPC · JPL
5951 Alicemonet	1986 TZ_{1}	Alicemonet	October 7, 1986	Anderson Mesa	E. Bowell	·	5.9 km (3.7 mi)	MPC · JPL
5952 Davemonet	1987 EV	Davemonet	March 4, 1987	Anderson Mesa	E. Bowell	·	4.9 km (3.0 mi)	MPC · JPL
5953 Shelton	1987 HS	Shelton	April 25, 1987	Palomar	C. S. Shoemaker, E. M. Shoemaker	PHO	4.8 km (3.0 mi)	MPC · JPL
5954 Epikouros	1987 QS_{1}	Epikouros	August 19, 1987	La Silla	E. W. Elst	·	5.7 km (3.5 mi)	MPC · JPL
5955 Khromchenko	1987 RT_{3}	Khromchenko	September 2, 1987	Nauchnij	L. I. Chernykh	GEF	7.4 km (4.6 mi)	MPC · JPL
5956 d'Alembert	1988 CF_{5}	d'Alembert	February 13, 1988	La Silla	E. W. Elst	·	12 km (7.5 mi)	MPC · JPL
5957 Irina	1988 JN	Irina	May 11, 1988	Palomar	C. S. Shoemaker, E. M. Shoemaker	·	15 km (9.3 mi)	MPC · JPL
5958 Barrande	1989 BS_{1}	Barrande	January 29, 1989	Kleť	A. Mrkos	·	5.3 km (3.3 mi)	MPC · JPL
5959 Shaklan	1989 NB_{1}	Shaklan	July 2, 1989	Palomar	E. F. Helin	URS	20 km (12 mi)	MPC · JPL
5960 Wakkanai	1989 US	Wakkanai	October 21, 1989	Kagoshima	M. Mukai, Takeishi, M.	·	4.7 km (2.9 mi)	MPC · JPL
5961 Watt	1989 YH_{1}	Watt	December 30, 1989	Siding Spring	R. H. McNaught	NYS	3.7 km (2.3 mi)	MPC · JPL
5962 Shikokutenkyo	1990 HK	Shikokutenkyo	April 18, 1990	Geisei	T. Seki	EUN	8.1 km (5.0 mi)	MPC · JPL
5963 Terryalfriend	1990 QP_{2}	Terryalfriend	August 24, 1990	Palomar	H. E. Holt	KOR	10 km (6.2 mi)	MPC · JPL
5964 Johnjunkins	1990 QN_{4}	Johnjunkins	August 23, 1990	Palomar	H. E. Holt	·	13 km (8.1 mi)	MPC · JPL
5965 Meisel	1990 SV_{15}	Meisel	September 16, 1990	Palomar	H. E. Holt	·	8.1 km (5.0 mi)	MPC · JPL
5966 Tomeko	1990 VS_{6}	Tomeko	November 15, 1990	Geisei	T. Seki	·	7.4 km (4.6 mi)	MPC · JPL
5967 Edithlevy	1991 CM_{5}	Edithlevy	February 9, 1991	Palomar	C. S. Shoemaker	H	3.1 km (1.9 mi)	MPC · JPL
5968 Trauger	1991 FC	Trauger	March 17, 1991	Palomar	E. F. Helin	H	4.8 km (3.0 mi)	MPC · JPL
5969 Ryuichiro	1991 FT	Ryuichiro	March 17, 1991	Geisei	T. Seki	V	4.1 km (2.5 mi)	MPC · JPL
5970 Ohdohrikouen	1991 JS_{1}	Ohdohrikouen	May 13, 1991	JCPM Sapporo	K. Watanabe	·	3.9 km (2.4 mi)	MPC · JPL
5971 Tickell	1991 NT_{2}	Tickell	July 12, 1991	Palomar	H. E. Holt	EUN	8.7 km (5.4 mi)	MPC · JPL
5972 Harryatkinson	1991 PS_{12}	Harryatkinson	August 5, 1991	Palomar	H. E. Holt	·	9.9 km (6.2 mi)	MPC · JPL
5973 Takimoto	1991 QC	Takimoto	August 17, 1991	Kiyosato	S. Otomo	·	7.3 km (4.5 mi)	MPC · JPL
5974	1991 UZ_{2}	—	October 31, 1991	Kushiro	S. Ueda, H. Kaneda	·	16 km (9.9 mi)	MPC · JPL
5975 Otakemayumi	1992 SG	Otakemayumi	September 21, 1992	Kitami	K. Endate, K. Watanabe	MAR	10 km (6.2 mi)	MPC · JPL
5976 Kalatajean	1992 SR_{2}	Kalatajean	September 25, 1992	Harvard Observatory	Oak Ridge Observatory	EUN	11 km (6.8 mi)	MPC · JPL
5977	1992 TH_{1}	—	October 1, 1992	Palomar	H. E. Holt	·	11 km (6.8 mi)	MPC · JPL
5978 Kaminokuni	1992 WT	Kaminokuni	November 16, 1992	Kitami	K. Endate, K. Watanabe	·	6.1 km (3.8 mi)	MPC · JPL
5979	1992 XF	—	December 15, 1992	Kushiro	S. Ueda, H. Kaneda	·	12 km (7.5 mi)	MPC · JPL
5980	1993 FP_{2}	—	March 26, 1993	Kushiro	S. Ueda, H. Kaneda	·	4.2 km (2.6 mi)	MPC · JPL
5981 Kresilas	2140 P-L	Kresilas	September 24, 1960	Palomar	C. J. van Houten, I. van Houten-Groeneveld, T. Gehrels	·	9.5 km (5.9 mi)	MPC · JPL
5982 Polykletus	4862 T-1	Polykletus	May 13, 1971	Palomar	C. J. van Houten, I. van Houten-Groeneveld, T. Gehrels	·	7.4 km (4.6 mi)	MPC · JPL
5983 Praxiteles	2285 T-2	Praxiteles	September 29, 1973	Palomar	C. J. van Houten, I. van Houten-Groeneveld, T. Gehrels	·	5.7 km (3.5 mi)	MPC · JPL
5984 Lysippus	4045 T-3	Lysippus	October 16, 1977	Palomar	C. J. van Houten, I. van Houten-Groeneveld, T. Gehrels	·	5.7 km (3.5 mi)	MPC · JPL
5985	1942 RJ	—	September 7, 1942	Turku	L. Oterma	·	6.2 km (3.9 mi)	MPC · JPL
5986 Xenophon	1969 TA	Xenophon	October 2, 1969	Zimmerwald	P. Wild	·	8.2 km (5.1 mi)	MPC · JPL
5987 Liviogratton	1975 LQ	Liviogratton	June 6, 1975	El Leoncito	Félix Aguilar Observatory	·	4.7 km (2.9 mi)	MPC · JPL
5988 Gorodnitskij	1976 GN_{2}	Gorodnitskij	April 1, 1976	Nauchnij	N. S. Chernykh	EUN	6.3 km (3.9 mi)	MPC · JPL
5989 Sorin	1976 QC_{1}	Sorin	August 26, 1976	Nauchnij	N. S. Chernykh	·	3.5 km (2.2 mi)	MPC · JPL
5990 Panticapaeon	1977 EO	Panticapaeon	March 9, 1977	Nauchnij	N. S. Chernykh	·	4.9 km (3.0 mi)	MPC · JPL
5991 Ivavladis	1979 HE_{3}	Ivavladis	April 25, 1979	Nauchnij	N. S. Chernykh	NYS	4.2 km (2.6 mi)	MPC · JPL
5992 Nittler	1981 DZ	Nittler	February 28, 1981	Siding Spring	S. J. Bus	·	7.5 km (4.7 mi)	MPC · JPL
5993 Tammydickinson	1981 EU_{22}	Tammydickinson	March 2, 1981	Siding Spring	S. J. Bus	·	4.4 km (2.7 mi)	MPC · JPL
5994 Yakubovich	1981 SZ_{7}	Yakubovich	September 29, 1981	Nauchnij	L. V. Zhuravleva	·	12 km (7.5 mi)	MPC · JPL
5995 Saint-Aignan	1982 DK	Saint-Aignan	February 20, 1982	Anderson Mesa	E. Bowell	·	7.8 km (4.8 mi)	MPC · JPL
5996 Julioángel	1983 NR	Julioángel	July 11, 1983	Anderson Mesa	E. Bowell	·	8.6 km (5.3 mi)	MPC · JPL
5997 Dirac	1983 TH	Dirac	October 1, 1983	Kleť	A. Mrkos	·	4.7 km (2.9 mi)	MPC · JPL
5998 Sitenský	1986 RK_{1}	Sitenský	September 2, 1986	Kleť	A. Mrkos	·	10 km (6.2 mi)	MPC · JPL
5999 Plescia	1987 HA	Plescia	April 23, 1987	Palomar	C. S. Shoemaker, E. M. Shoemaker	·	7.1 km (4.4 mi)	MPC · JPL
6000 United Nations	1987 UN	United Nations	October 27, 1987	Brorfelde	P. Jensen	EUN	11 km (6.8 mi)	MPC · JPL

back to top

== See also ==
- Meanings of minor-planet names: 5001–6000
