= List of minor planets: 10001–11000 =

The following is a partial list of minor planets, running from minor-planet number 10001 through 11000, inclusive. The primary data for this and other partial lists is based on JPL's "Small-Body Orbital Elements" and data available from the Minor Planet Center. Critical list information is also provided by the MPC, unless otherwise specified from Lowell Observatory. A detailed description of the table's columns and additional sources are given on the main page including a complete list of every page in this series, and a statistical break-up on the dynamical classification of minor planets.

Also see the summary list of all named bodies in numerical and alphabetical order, and the corresponding naming citations for the number range of this particular list. New namings may only be added to this list after official publication, as the preannouncement of names is condemned by the Working Group for Small Bodies Nomenclature of the International Astronomical Union.

Near-Earth obj.	MBA (inner)	MBA (outer)	Centaur
Mars-crosser	MBA (middle)	Jupiter trojan	Trans-Neptunian obj.
Unclassified

== 10001–10100 ==
Designation			Discovery			Properties		Ref
Permanent	Provisional	Named after	Date	Site	Discoverer(s)	Category	Diam.	Ref
10001 Palermo	1969 TM_{1}	Palermo	October 8, 1969	Nauchnij	L. I. Chernykh	V · slow	4.1 km	MPC; JPL
10002 Bagdasarian	1969 TQ_{1}	Bagdasarian	October 8, 1969	Nauchnij	L. I. Chernykh	THM	8.6 km	MPC; JPL
10003 Caryhuang	1971 UD_{1}	Caryhuang	October 26, 1971	Hamburg-Bergedorf	L. Kohoutek	·	3.5 km	MPC; JPL
10004 Igormakarov	1975 VV_{2}	Igormakarov	November 2, 1975	Nauchnij	T. M. Smirnova	·	8.1 km	MPC; JPL
10005 Chernega	1976 SS_{2}	Chernega	September 24, 1976	Nauchnij	N. S. Chernykh	·	9.0 km	MPC; JPL
10006 Sessai	1976 UR_{15}	Sessai	October 22, 1976	Kiso	H. Kosai, K. Furukawa	·	7.6 km	MPC; JPL
10007 Malytheatre	1976 YF_{3}	Malytheatre	December 16, 1976	Nauchnij	L. I. Chernykh	·	26 km	MPC; JPL
10008 Raisanyo	1977 DT_{2}	Raisanyo	February 18, 1977	Kiso	H. Kosai, K. Furukawa	·	5.5 km	MPC; JPL
10009 Hirosetanso	1977 EA_{6}	Hirosetanso	March 12, 1977	Kiso	H. Kosai, K. Furukawa	·	4.3 km	MPC; JPL
10010 Rudruna	1978 PW_{3}	Rudruna	August 9, 1978	Nauchnij	N. S. Chernykh, L. I. Chernykh	V	3.0 km	MPC; JPL
10011 Avidzba	1978 QY_{1}	Avidzba	August 31, 1978	Nauchnij	N. S. Chernykh	·	4.2 km	MPC; JPL
10012 Tmutarakania	1978 RE_{3}	Tmutarakania	September 3, 1978	Nauchnij	N. S. Chernykh, L. G. Karachkina	NYS	4.0 km	MPC; JPL
10013 Stenholm	1978 RR_{8}	Stenholm	September 2, 1978	La Silla	C.-I. Lagerkvist	·	10 km	MPC; JPL
10014 Shaim	1978 SE_{3}	Shaim	September 26, 1978	Nauchnij	L. V. Zhuravleva	·	7.4 km	MPC; JPL
10015 Valenlebedev	1978 SA_{5}	Valenlebedev	September 27, 1978	Nauchnij	L. I. Chernykh	·	2.6 km	MPC; JPL
10016 Yugan	1978 SW_{7}	Yugan	September 26, 1978	Nauchnij	L. V. Zhuravleva	·	3.0 km	MPC; JPL
10017 Jaotsungi	1978 UP_{2}	Jaotsungi	October 30, 1978	Nanking	Purple Mountain	·	4.5 km	MPC; JPL
10018 Lykawka	1979 MG_{4}	Lykawka	June 25, 1979	Siding Spring	E. F. Helin, S. J. Bus	THM	11 km	MPC; JPL
10019 Wesleyfraser	1979 MK_{7}	Wesleyfraser	June 25, 1979	Siding Spring	E. F. Helin, S. J. Bus	slow	11 km	MPC; JPL
10020 Bagenal	1979 OQ_{5}	Bagenal	July 24, 1979	Palomar	S. J. Bus	·	9.2 km	MPC; JPL
10021 Henja	1979 QC_{1}	Henja	August 22, 1979	La Silla	C.-I. Lagerkvist	·	7.2 km	MPC; JPL
10022 Zubov	1979 SU_{2}	Zubov	September 22, 1979	Nauchnij	N. S. Chernykh	V	4.1 km	MPC; JPL
10023 Vladifedorov	1979 WX_{3}	Vladifedorov	November 17, 1979	Nauchnij	L. I. Chernykh	MAS	7.3 km	MPC; JPL
10024 Marthahazen	1980 EB	Marthahazen	March 10, 1980	Harvard Observatory	Harvard Observatory	·	7.4 km	MPC; JPL
10025 Rauer	1980 FO_{1}	Rauer	March 16, 1980	La Silla	C.-I. Lagerkvist	KOR	8.2 km	MPC; JPL
10026 Sophiexeon	1980 RE_{1}	Sophiexeon	September 3, 1980	Kleť	A. Mrkos	KON	11 km	MPC; JPL
10027 Perozzi	1981 FL	Perozzi	March 30, 1981	Anderson Mesa	E. Bowell	·	7.7 km	MPC; JPL
10028 Bonus	1981 JM_{2}	Bonus	May 5, 1981	Palomar	C. S. Shoemaker	NYS · fast	3.7 km	MPC; JPL
10029 Hiramperkins	1981 QF	Hiramperkins	August 30, 1981	Anderson Mesa	E. Bowell	·	4.4 km	MPC; JPL
10030 Philkeenan	1981 QG	Philkeenan	August 30, 1981	Anderson Mesa	E. Bowell	·	11 km	MPC; JPL
10031 Vladarnolda	1981 RB_{2}	Vladarnolda	September 7, 1981	Nauchnij	L. G. Karachkina	EUN	6.3 km	MPC; JPL
10032 Hans-Ulrich	1981 RF_{7}	Hans-Ulrich	September 3, 1981	Palomar	S. J. Bus	·	5.7 km	MPC; JPL
10033 Bodewits	1981 UJ_{23}	Bodewits	October 24, 1981	Palomar	S. J. Bus	EOS	8.3 km	MPC; JPL
10034 Birlan	1981 YG	Birlan	December 30, 1981	Anderson Mesa	E. Bowell	·	10 km	MPC; JPL
10035 Davidgheesling	1982 DC_{2}	Davidgheesling	February 16, 1982	Kleť	L. Brožek	·	5.4 km	MPC; JPL
10036 McGaha	1982 OF	McGaha	July 24, 1982	Anderson Mesa	E. Bowell	·	2.7 km	MPC; JPL
10037 Raypickard	1984 BQ	Raypickard	January 26, 1984	Kleť	A. Mrkos	·	5.5 km	MPC; JPL
10038 Tanaro	1984 HO_{1}	Tanaro	April 28, 1984	La Silla	V. Zappalà	·	3.2 km	MPC; JPL
10039 Keet Seel	1984 LK	Keet Seel	June 2, 1984	Anderson Mesa	B. A. Skiff	·	11 km	MPC; JPL
10040 Ghillar	1984 QM	Ghillar	August 24, 1984	Kleť	Z. Vávrová	·	2.7 km	MPC; JPL
10041 Parkinson	1985 HS_{1}	Parkinson	April 24, 1985	Palomar	C. S. Shoemaker, E. M. Shoemaker	PHO	3.8 km	MPC; JPL
10042 Budstewart	1985 PL	Budstewart	August 14, 1985	Anderson Mesa	E. Bowell	·	6.2 km	MPC; JPL
10043 Janegann	1985 PN	Janegann	August 14, 1985	Anderson Mesa	E. Bowell	·	16 km	MPC; JPL
10044 Squyres	1985 RU	Squyres	September 15, 1985	Palomar	C. S. Shoemaker, E. M. Shoemaker	moon	4.6 km	MPC; JPL
10045 Dorarussell	1985 RJ_{3}	Dorarussell	September 6, 1985	La Silla	H. Debehogne	THM	16 km	MPC; JPL
10046 Creighton	1986 JC	Creighton	May 2, 1986	Palomar	INAS	·	10 km	MPC; JPL
10047 Davidchapman	1986 QK_{2}	Davidchapman	August 28, 1986	La Silla	H. Debehogne	PHO	4.8 km	MPC; JPL
10048 Grönbech	1986 TQ	Grönbech	October 3, 1986	Brorfelde	P. Jensen	·	7.6 km	MPC; JPL
10049 Vorovich	1986 TZ_{11}	Vorovich	October 3, 1986	Nauchnij	L. G. Karachkina	(1298)	6.1 km	MPC; JPL
10050 Rayman	1987 MA_{1}	Rayman	June 28, 1987	Palomar	E. F. Helin	·	13 km	MPC; JPL
10051 Albee	1987 QG_{6}	Albee	August 23, 1987	Palomar	E. F. Helin	·	2.2 km	MPC; JPL
10052 Nason	1987 SM_{12}	Nason	September 16, 1987	La Silla	H. Debehogne	KOR	6.1 km	MPC; JPL
10053 Noeldetilly	1987 SR_{12}	Noeldetilly	September 16, 1987	La Silla	H. Debehogne	·	4.5 km	MPC; JPL
10054 Solomin	1987 SQ_{17}	Solomin	September 17, 1987	Nauchnij	L. I. Chernykh	slow	4.0 km	MPC; JPL
10055 Silcher	1987 YC_{1}	Silcher	December 22, 1987	Tautenburg Observatory	F. Börngen	·	6.2 km	MPC; JPL
10056 Johnschroer	1988 BX_{3}	Johnschroer	January 19, 1988	La Silla	H. Debehogne	V	4.0 km	MPC; JPL
10057 L'Obel	1988 CO_{1}	L'Obel	February 11, 1988	La Silla	E. W. Elst	·	7.8 km	MPC; JPL
10058 Ikwilliamson	1988 DD_{5}	Ikwilliamson	February 25, 1988	Siding Spring	R. H. McNaught	·	6.2 km	MPC; JPL
10059 McCullough	1988 FS_{2}	McCullough	March 21, 1988	Smolyan	Bulgarian National Observatory	NYS	4.4 km	MPC; JPL
10060 Amymilne	1988 GL	Amymilne	April 12, 1988	Palomar	C. S. Shoemaker, E. M. Shoemaker	PHO	4.5 km	MPC; JPL
10061 Ndolaprata	1988 PG_{1}	Ndolaprata	August 11, 1988	Siding Spring	Noymer, A. J.	·	10 km	MPC; JPL
10062 Kimhay	1988 RV_{4}	Kimhay	September 1, 1988	La Silla	H. Debehogne	·	4.0 km	MPC; JPL
10063 Erinleeryan	1988 SZ_{2}	Erinleeryan	September 16, 1988	Cerro Tololo	S. J. Bus	3:2	20 km	MPC; JPL
10064 Hirosetamotsu	1988 UO	Hirosetamotsu	October 31, 1988	Chiyoda	T. Kojima	·	9.6 km	MPC; JPL
10065 Greglisk	1988 XK	Greglisk	December 3, 1988	Gekko	Y. Oshima	·	12 km	MPC; JPL
10066 Pihack	1988 XV_{2}	Pihack	December 1, 1988	Brorfelde	P. Jensen	·	2.5 km	MPC; JPL
10067 Bertuch	1989 AL_{6}	Bertuch	January 11, 1989	Tautenburg Observatory	F. Börngen	·	2.8 km	MPC; JPL
10068 Dodoens	1989 CT_{2}	Dodoens	February 4, 1989	La Silla	E. W. Elst	·	3.1 km	MPC; JPL
10069 Fontenelle	1989 CW_{2}	Fontenelle	February 4, 1989	La Silla	E. W. Elst	EOS	12 km	MPC; JPL
10070 Liuzongli	1989 CB_{8}	Liuzongli	February 7, 1989	La Silla	H. Debehogne	·	3.3 km	MPC; JPL
10071 Paraguay	1989 EZ_{2}	Paraguay	March 2, 1989	La Silla	E. W. Elst	·	2.8 km	MPC; JPL
10072 Uruguay	1989 GF_{1}	Uruguay	April 3, 1989	La Silla	E. W. Elst	·	3.5 km	MPC; JPL
10073 Peterhiscocks	1989 GJ_{2}	Peterhiscocks	April 3, 1989	La Silla	E. W. Elst	·	5.0 km	MPC; JPL
10074 Van den Berghe	1989 GH_{4}	Van den Berghe	April 3, 1989	La Silla	E. W. Elst	·	3.9 km	MPC; JPL
10075 Campeche	1989 GR_{4}	Campeche	April 3, 1989	La Silla	E. W. Elst	·	4.2 km	MPC; JPL
10076 Rogerhill	1989 PK	Rogerhill	August 9, 1989	Palomar	E. F. Helin	·	6.5 km	MPC; JPL
10077 Raykoenig	1989 UL_{1}	Raykoenig	October 26, 1989	Kushiro	S. Ueda, H. Kaneda	·	8.3 km	MPC; JPL
10078 Stanthorpe	1989 UJ_{3}	Stanthorpe	October 30, 1989	Geisei	T. Seki	EUN	5.2 km	MPC; JPL
10079 Meunier	1989 XD_{2}	Meunier	December 2, 1989	La Silla	E. W. Elst	·	4.3 km	MPC; JPL
10080 Macevans	1990 OF_{1}	Macevans	July 18, 1990	Palomar	E. F. Helin	·	17 km	MPC; JPL
10081 Dantaylor	1990 OW_{1}	Dantaylor	July 29, 1990	Palomar	H. E. Holt	·	3.5 km	MPC; JPL
10082 Bronson	1990 OF_{2}	Bronson	July 29, 1990	Palomar	H. E. Holt	ERI	5.9 km	MPC; JPL
10083 Gordonanderson	1990 QE_{2}	Gordonanderson	August 22, 1990	Palomar	H. E. Holt	·	3.2 km	MPC; JPL
10084 Rossparker	1990 QC_{5}	Rossparker	August 25, 1990	Palomar	H. E. Holt	·	3.9 km	MPC; JPL
10085 Jekennedy	1990 QF_{5}	Jekennedy	August 25, 1990	Palomar	H. E. Holt	·	19 km	MPC; JPL
10086 McCurdy	1990 SZ	McCurdy	September 16, 1990	Palomar	H. E. Holt	·	4.6 km	MPC; JPL
10087 Dechesne	1990 SG_{3}	Dechesne	September 18, 1990	Palomar	H. E. Holt	·	4.2 km	MPC; JPL
10088 Digne	1990 SG_{8}	Digne	September 22, 1990	La Silla	E. W. Elst	·	5.6 km	MPC; JPL
10089 Turgot	1990 SS_{9}	Turgot	September 22, 1990	La Silla	E. W. Elst	NYS	4.0 km	MPC; JPL
10090 Sikorsky	1990 TK_{15}	Sikorsky	October 13, 1990	Nauchnij	L. G. Karachkina, G. R. Kastelʹ	V	4.6 km	MPC; JPL
10091 Bandaisan	1990 VD_{3}	Bandaisan	November 11, 1990	Geisei	T. Seki	·	4.1 km	MPC; JPL
10092 Sasaki	1990 VD_{4}	Sasaki	November 15, 1990	Kitami	K. Endate, K. Watanabe	·	2.9 km	MPC; JPL
10093 Diesel	1990 WX_{1}	Diesel	November 18, 1990	La Silla	E. W. Elst	V	2.5 km	MPC; JPL
10094 Eijikato	1991 DK	Eijikato	February 20, 1991	Geisei	T. Seki	MAR	9.5 km	MPC; JPL
10095 Carlloewe	1991 RP_{2}	Carlloewe	September 9, 1991	Tautenburg Observatory	F. Börngen, L. D. Schmadel	EOS	10 km	MPC; JPL
10096 Colleenohare	1991 RK_{5}	Colleenohare	September 13, 1991	Palomar	H. E. Holt	EOS	11 km	MPC; JPL
10097 Humbroncos	1991 RV_{16}	Humbroncos	September 15, 1991	Palomar	H. E. Holt	·	2.9 km	MPC; JPL
10098 Jaymiematthews	1991 SC_{1}	Jaymiematthews	September 30, 1991	Siding Spring	R. H. McNaught	EOS	8.8 km	MPC; JPL
10099 Glazebrook	1991 VB_{9}	Glazebrook	November 4, 1991	Kitt Peak	Spacewatch	THM	10 km	MPC; JPL
10100 Bürgel	1991 XH_{1}	Bürgel	December 10, 1991	Tautenburg Observatory	F. Börngen	MAS	3.7 km	MPC; JPL

== 10101–10200 ==
back to top

Designation			Discovery			Properties		Ref
Permanent	Provisional	Named after	Date	Site	Discoverer(s)	Category	Diam.	Ref
10101 Fourier	1992 BM_{2}	Fourier	January 30, 1992	La Silla	E. W. Elst	·	3.9 km	MPC; JPL
10102 Digerhuvud	1992 DA_{6}	Digerhuvud	February 29, 1992	La Silla	UESAC	MAS	2.8 km	MPC; JPL
10103 Jungfrun	1992 DB_{9}	Jungfrun	February 29, 1992	La Silla	UESAC	·	4.4 km	MPC; JPL
10104 Hoburgsgubben	1992 EY_{9}	Hoburgsgubben	March 2, 1992	La Silla	UESAC	·	4.3 km	MPC; JPL
10105 Holmhällar	1992 EM_{12}	Holmhällar	March 6, 1992	La Silla	UESAC	THM	12 km	MPC; JPL
10106 Lergrav	1992 EV_{15}	Lergrav	March 1, 1992	La Silla	UESAC	NYS	1.9 km	MPC; JPL
10107 Kenny	1992 FW_{1}	Kenny	March 27, 1992	Siding Spring	D. I. Steel	PHO	3.2 km	MPC; JPL
10108 Tomlinson	1992 HM	Tomlinson	April 26, 1992	Palomar	C. S. Shoemaker, E. M. Shoemaker	PHO	4.8 km	MPC; JPL
10109 Sidhu	1992 KQ	Sidhu	May 29, 1992	Palomar	E. F. Helin	EUN	9.5 km	MPC; JPL
10110 Jameshead	1992 LJ	Jameshead	June 3, 1992	Palomar	G. J. Leonard	·	4.8 km	MPC; JPL
10111 Fresnel	1992 OO_{1}	Fresnel	July 25, 1992	Caussols	E. W. Elst	·	9.9 km	MPC; JPL
10112 Skookumjim	1992 OP_{1}	Skookumjim	July 31, 1992	Palomar	H. E. Holt	·	8.7 km	MPC; JPL
10113 Alantitle	1992 PX_{2}	Alantitle	August 6, 1992	Palomar	H. E. Holt	·	10 km	MPC; JPL
10114 Greifswald	1992 RZ	Greifswald	September 4, 1992	Tautenburg Observatory	L. D. Schmadel, F. Börngen	KOR	7.9 km	MPC; JPL
10115	1992 SK	—	September 24, 1992	Palomar	E. F. Helin, J. Alu	APO +1km · PHA	940 m	MPC; JPL
10116 Robertfranz	1992 SJ_{2}	Robertfranz	September 21, 1992	Tautenburg Observatory	F. Börngen, L. D. Schmadel	EOS	8.6 km	MPC; JPL
10117 Tanikawa	1992 TW	Tanikawa	October 1, 1992	Kitami	M. Yanai, K. Watanabe	EOS ·	9.1 km	MPC; JPL
10118 Jiwu	1992 UK_{1}	Jiwu	October 19, 1992	Kushiro	S. Ueda, H. Kaneda	GEF · slow	7.3 km	MPC; JPL
10119 Remarque	1992 YC_{1}	Remarque	December 18, 1992	Caussols	E. W. Elst	THM	14 km	MPC; JPL
10120 Ypres	1992 YH_{2}	Ypres	December 18, 1992	Caussols	E. W. Elst	VER	13 km	MPC; JPL
10121 Arzamas	1993 BS_{4}	Arzamas	January 27, 1993	Caussols	E. W. Elst	THM	11 km	MPC; JPL
10122 Fröding	1993 BC_{5}	Fröding	January 27, 1993	Caussols	E. W. Elst	THM	12 km	MPC; JPL
10123 Fideöja	1993 FJ_{16}	Fideöja	March 17, 1993	La Silla	UESAC	moon	3.5 km	MPC; JPL
10124 Hemse	1993 FE_{23}	Hemse	March 21, 1993	La Silla	UESAC	·	5.2 km	MPC; JPL
10125 Stenkyrka	1993 FB_{24}	Stenkyrka	March 21, 1993	La Silla	UESAC	·	3.4 km	MPC; JPL
10126 Lärbro	1993 FW_{24}	Lärbro	March 21, 1993	La Silla	UESAC	·	4.1 km	MPC; JPL
10127 Fröjel	1993 FF_{26}	Fröjel	March 21, 1993	La Silla	UESAC	·	2.3 km	MPC; JPL
10128 Bro	1993 FT_{31}	Bro	March 19, 1993	La Silla	UESAC	·	3.5 km	MPC; JPL
10129 Fole	1993 FO_{40}	Fole	March 19, 1993	La Silla	UESAC	·	3.2 km	MPC; JPL
10130 Ardre	1993 FJ_{50}	Ardre	March 19, 1993	La Silla	UESAC	·	3.2 km	MPC; JPL
10131 Stånga	1993 FP_{73}	Stånga	March 21, 1993	La Silla	UESAC	·	2.2 km	MPC; JPL
10132 Lummelunda	1993 FL_{84}	Lummelunda	March 20, 1993	La Silla	UESAC	moon	3.6 km	MPC; JPL
10133 Gerdahorneck	1993 GC_{1}	Gerdahorneck	April 15, 1993	Palomar	H. E. Holt	·	5.4 km	MPC; JPL
10134 Joycepenner	1993 HL_{6}	Joycepenner	April 17, 1993	La Silla	H. Debehogne	·	4.6 km	MPC; JPL
10135 Wimhermsen	1993 LZ_{1}	Wimhermsen	June 13, 1993	Palomar	H. E. Holt	V	4.5 km	MPC; JPL
10136 Gauguin	1993 OM_{3}	Gauguin	July 20, 1993	La Silla	E. W. Elst	·	3.5 km	MPC; JPL
10137 Thucydides	1993 PV_{6}	Thucydides	August 15, 1993	Caussols	E. W. Elst	·	3.3 km	MPC; JPL
10138 Ohtanihiroshi	1993 SS_{1}	Ohtanihiroshi	September 16, 1993	Kitami	K. Endate, K. Watanabe	(5)	5.8 km	MPC; JPL
10139 Ronsard	1993 ST_{4}	Ronsard	September 19, 1993	Caussols	E. W. Elst	·	4.0 km	MPC; JPL
10140 Villon	1993 SX_{4}	Villon	September 19, 1993	Caussols	E. W. Elst	NYS · moon	4.8 km	MPC; JPL
10141 Gotenba	1993 VE	Gotenba	November 5, 1993	Kiyosato	S. Otomo	EUN	9.3 km	MPC; JPL
10142 Sakka	1993 VG_{1}	Sakka	November 15, 1993	Dynic	A. Sugie	·	10 km	MPC; JPL
10143 Kamogawa	1994 AP_{1}	Kamogawa	January 8, 1994	Dynic	A. Sugie	·	22 km	MPC; JPL
10144 Bernardbigot	1994 AB_{2}	Bernardbigot	January 9, 1994	Yatsugatake	Y. Kushida, O. Muramatsu	·	7.1 km	MPC; JPL
10145	1994 CK_{1}	—	February 10, 1994	Kitt Peak	Spacewatch	APO +1km	1.4 km	MPC; JPL
10146 Mukaitadashi	1994 CV_{1}	Mukaitadashi	February 8, 1994	Kitami	K. Endate, K. Watanabe	·	10 km	MPC; JPL
10147 Mizugatsuka	1994 CK_{2}	Mizugatsuka	February 13, 1994	Ōizumi	T. Kobayashi	THM	12 km	MPC; JPL
10148 Shirase	1994 GR_{9}	Shirase	April 14, 1994	Kiyosato	S. Otomo	THM	16 km	MPC; JPL
10149 Cavagna	1994 PA	Cavagna	August 3, 1994	San Marcello	M. Tombelli, A. Boattini	·	2.2 km	MPC; JPL
10150	1994 PN	—	August 7, 1994	Siding Spring	G. J. Garradd	T_{j} (2.98) · AMO +1km	2.9 km	MPC; JPL
10151 Rubens	1994 PF_{22}	Rubens	August 12, 1994	La Silla	E. W. Elst	·	5.0 km	MPC; JPL
10152 Ukichiro	1994 RJ_{11}	Ukichiro	September 11, 1994	Kiyosato	S. Otomo	V	4.6 km	MPC; JPL
10153 Goldman	1994 UB	Goldman	October 26, 1994	Sudbury	D. di Cicco	·	3.7 km	MPC; JPL
10154 Tanuki	1994 UH	Tanuki	October 31, 1994	Ōizumi	T. Kobayashi	·	4.1 km	MPC; JPL
10155 Numaguti	1994 VZ_{2}	Numaguti	November 4, 1994	Kitami	K. Endate, K. Watanabe	·	3.6 km	MPC; JPL
10156 Darnley	1994 VQ_{7}	Darnley	November 7, 1994	Kushiro	S. Ueda, H. Kaneda	·	2.8 km	MPC; JPL
10157 Asagiri	1994 WE_{1}	Asagiri	November 27, 1994	Ōizumi	T. Kobayashi	V	3.5 km	MPC; JPL
10158 Taroubou	1994 XK	Taroubou	December 3, 1994	Ōizumi	T. Kobayashi	·	5.0 km	MPC; JPL
10159 Tokara	1994 XS_{4}	Tokara	December 9, 1994	Ōizumi	T. Kobayashi	·	4.6 km	MPC; JPL
10160 Totoro	1994 YQ_{1}	Totoro	December 31, 1994	Ōizumi	T. Kobayashi	V	3.1 km	MPC; JPL
10161 Nakanoshima	1994 YZ_{1}	Nakanoshima	December 31, 1994	Ōizumi	T. Kobayashi	·	5.6 km	MPC; JPL
10162 Issunboushi	1995 AL	Issunboushi	January 2, 1995	Ojima	T. Niijima, T. Urata	·	3.3 km	MPC; JPL
10163 Onomichi	1995 BH_{1}	Onomichi	January 26, 1995	Kuma Kogen	A. Nakamura	·	2.8 km	MPC; JPL
10164 Akusekijima	1995 BS_{1}	Akusekijima	January 27, 1995	Ōizumi	T. Kobayashi	EUN	7.6 km	MPC; JPL
10165	1995 BL_{2}	—	January 31, 1995	Kitt Peak	Spacewatch	APO +1km	830 m	MPC; JPL
10166 Takarajima	1995 BN_{3}	Takarajima	January 30, 1995	Ōizumi	T. Kobayashi	·	4.9 km	MPC; JPL
10167 Yoshiwatiso	1995 BQ_{15}	Yoshiwatiso	January 31, 1995	Geisei	T. Seki	NYS	4.2 km	MPC; JPL
10168 Stony Ridge	1995 CN	Stony Ridge	February 4, 1995	Stony Ridge	Child, J. B., Rogers, J. E.	·	4.6 km	MPC; JPL
10169 Ogasawara	1995 DK	Ogasawara	February 21, 1995	Ōizumi	T. Kobayashi	·	7.4 km	MPC; JPL
10170 Petrjakeš	1995 DA_{1}	Petrjakeš	February 22, 1995	Kleť	M. Tichý, Z. Moravec	·	6.2 km	MPC; JPL
10171 Takaotengu	1995 EE_{8}	Takaotengu	March 7, 1995	Nyukasa	M. Hirasawa, S. Suzuki	·	14 km	MPC; JPL
10172 Humphreys	1995 FW_{19}	Humphreys	March 31, 1995	Kitt Peak	Spacewatch	PAD	9.8 km	MPC; JPL
10173 Hanzelkazikmund	1995 HA	Hanzelkazikmund	April 21, 1995	Ondřejov	P. Pravec, L. Kotková	EOS	6.0 km	MPC; JPL
10174 Emička	1995 JD	Emička	May 2, 1995	Kleť	Z. Moravec	·	4.5 km	MPC; JPL
10175 Aenona	1996 CR_{1}	Aenona	February 14, 1996	Višnjan Observatory	K. Korlević, Matković, D.	·	4.0 km	MPC; JPL
10176 Gaiavettori	1996 CW_{7}	Gaiavettori	February 14, 1996	Cima Ekar	M. Tombelli, U. Munari	·	2.9 km	MPC; JPL
10177 Ellison	1996 CK_{9}	Ellison	February 10, 1996	Kitt Peak	Spacewatch	·	4.9 km	MPC; JPL
10178 Iriki	1996 DD	Iriki	February 18, 1996	Ōizumi	T. Kobayashi	·	3.2 km	MPC; JPL
10179 Ishigaki	1996 DE	Ishigaki	February 18, 1996	Ōizumi	T. Kobayashi	MAR	6.3 km	MPC; JPL
10180	1996 EE_{2}	—	March 15, 1996	Loomberah	G. J. Garradd	·	3.6 km	MPC; JPL
10181 Davidacomba	1996 FP_{3}	Davidacomba	March 26, 1996	Prescott	P. G. Comba	·	1.6 km	MPC; JPL
10182 Junkobiwaki	1996 FL_{5}	Junkobiwaki	March 20, 1996	Kitami	K. Endate, K. Watanabe	·	4.8 km	MPC; JPL
10183 Ampère	1996 GV_{20}	Ampère	April 15, 1996	La Silla	E. W. Elst	·	2.3 km	MPC; JPL
10184 Galvani	1996 HC_{19}	Galvani	April 18, 1996	La Silla	E. W. Elst	·	4.5 km	MPC; JPL
10185 Gaudi	1996 HD_{21}	Gaudi	April 18, 1996	La Silla	E. W. Elst	·	7.9 km	MPC; JPL
10186 Albéniz	1996 HD_{24}	Albéniz	April 20, 1996	La Silla	E. W. Elst	·	4.0 km	MPC; JPL
10187	1996 JV	—	May 12, 1996	Catalina Station	T. B. Spahr	PHO	6.2 km	MPC; JPL
10188 Yasuoyoneda	1996 JY	Yasuoyoneda	May 14, 1996	Moriyama	R. H. McNaught, Ikari, Y.	·	5.4 km	MPC; JPL
10189 Normanrockwell	1996 JK_{16}	Normanrockwell	May 15, 1996	Kitt Peak	Spacewatch	·	9.7 km	MPC; JPL
10190 Suzannedodd	1996 NC	Suzannedodd	July 14, 1996	Haleakalā	NEAT	·	5.1 km	MPC; JPL
10191 Scottbolton	1996 NU_{1}	Scottbolton	July 14, 1996	Haleakalā	NEAT	·	12 km	MPC; JPL
10192 Wanglizhe	1996 OQ_{1}	Wanglizhe	July 20, 1996	Xinglong	SCAP	KOR	4.4 km	MPC; JPL
10193 Nishimoto	1996 PR_{1}	Nishimoto	August 8, 1996	Haleakalā	AMOS	·	8.6 km	MPC; JPL
10194 Tonygeorge	1996 QN_{1}	Tonygeorge	August 18, 1996	Rand	G. R. Viscome	EOS	7.6 km	MPC; JPL
10195 Nebraska	1996 RS_{5}	Nebraska	September 13, 1996	Lime Creek	R. Linderholm	·	10 km	MPC; JPL
10196 Akiraarai	1996 TJ_{15}	Akiraarai	October 9, 1996	Kushiro	S. Ueda, H. Kaneda	THM	9.9 km	MPC; JPL
10197 Senigalliesi	1996 UO	Senigalliesi	October 18, 1996	Pianoro	V. Goretti	KOR	6.6 km	MPC; JPL
10198 Pinelli	1996 XN_{26}	Pinelli	December 6, 1996	Asiago	M. Tombelli, U. Munari	KOR	6.5 km	MPC; JPL
10199 Chariklo	1997 CU_{26}	Chariklo	February 15, 1997	Spacewatch	Spacewatch	centaur	302 km	MPC; JPL
10200 Quadri	1997 NZ_{2}	Quadri	July 7, 1997	Pianoro	V. Goretti	·	6.2 km	MPC; JPL

== 10201–10300 ==
back to top

Designation			Discovery			Properties		Ref
Permanent	Provisional	Named after	Date	Site	Discoverer(s)	Category	Diam.	Ref
10201 Korado	1997 NL_{6}	Korado	July 12, 1997	Farra d'Isonzo	Farra d'Isonzo	·	2.3 km	MPC; JPL
10202 Mioaramandea	1997 PE	Mioaramandea	August 1, 1997	Haleakalā	NEAT	V	4.4 km	MPC; JPL
10203 Flinders	1997 PQ	Flinders	August 1, 1997	Woomera	F. B. Zoltowski	·	3.6 km	MPC; JPL
10204 Turing	1997 PK_{1}	Turing	August 1, 1997	Prescott	P. G. Comba	·	4.4 km	MPC; JPL
10205 Pokorný	1997 PX_{1}	Pokorný	August 7, 1997	Kleť	M. Tichý, Z. Moravec	·	4.8 km	MPC; JPL
10206	1997 PC_{2}	—	August 7, 1997	Fitchburg	L. L. Amburgey	·	3.5 km	MPC; JPL
10207 Comeniana	1997 QA	Comeniana	August 16, 1997	Modra	L. Kornoš, P. Kolény	·	4.9 km	MPC; JPL
10208 Germanicus	1997 QN_{1}	Germanicus	August 30, 1997	Stroncone	A. Vagnozzi	(883) · moon	3.6 km	MPC; JPL
10209 Izanaki	1997 QY_{1}	Izanaki	August 24, 1997	Nachi-Katsuura	Y. Shimizu, T. Urata	NYS	4.3 km	MPC; JPL
10210 Nathues	1997 QV_{3}	Nathues	August 30, 1997	Caussols	ODAS	·	4.5 km	MPC; JPL
10211 La Spezia	1997 RG_{3}	La Spezia	September 6, 1997	Monte Viseggi	Viseggi, Monte	NYS	5.3 km	MPC; JPL
10212	1997 RA_{7}	—	September 3, 1997	Church Stretton	S. P. Laurie	·	4.7 km	MPC; JPL
10213 Koukolík	1997 RK_{7}	Koukolík	September 10, 1997	Kleť	M. Tichý, Z. Moravec	·	3.4 km	MPC; JPL
10214	1997 RT_{9}	—	September 10, 1997	Uccle	T. Pauwels	·	5.2 km	MPC; JPL
10215 Lavilledemirmont	1997 SQ	Lavilledemirmont	September 20, 1997	Ondřejov	L. Kotková	·	7.0 km	MPC; JPL
10216 Popastro	1997 SN_{3}	Popastro	September 22, 1997	Church Stretton	S. P. Laurie	MRX	5.8 km	MPC; JPL
10217 Richardcook	1997 SN_{4}	Richardcook	September 27, 1997	Haleakalā	NEAT	·	7.7 km	MPC; JPL
10218 Bierstadt	1997 SJ_{23}	Bierstadt	September 29, 1997	Kitt Peak	Spacewatch	·	3.4 km	MPC; JPL
10219 Penco	1997 UJ_{5}	Penco	October 25, 1997	San Marcello	L. Tesi, A. Boattini	·	3.4 km	MPC; JPL
10220 Pigott	1997 UG_{7}	Pigott	October 20, 1997	Goodricke-Pigott	R. A. Tucker	EUN	4.5 km	MPC; JPL
10221 Kubrick	1997 UM_{9}	Kubrick	October 28, 1997	Ondřejov	P. Pravec	·	4.2 km	MPC; JPL
10222 Klotz	1997 UV_{10}	Klotz	October 29, 1997	Ramonville	Buil, C.	GEF	7.3 km	MPC; JPL
10223 Zashikiwarashi	1997 UD_{11}	Zashikiwarashi	October 31, 1997	Oohira	T. Urata	THM	11 km	MPC; JPL
10224 Hisashi	1997 UK_{22}	Hisashi	October 26, 1997	Chichibu	N. Satō	NYS	8.5 km	MPC; JPL
10225	1997 VQ_{1}	—	November 1, 1997	Kushiro	S. Ueda, H. Kaneda	·	10 km	MPC; JPL
10226 Seishika	1997 VK_{5}	Seishika	November 8, 1997	Ōizumi	T. Kobayashi	·	16 km	MPC; JPL
10227 Izanami	1997 VO_{6}	Izanami	November 4, 1997	Gekko	T. Kagawa, T. Urata	·	17 km	MPC; JPL
10228	1997 VY_{8}	—	November 1, 1997	Kushiro	S. Ueda, H. Kaneda	EOS	8.9 km	MPC; JPL
10229	1997 WR_{3}	—	November 19, 1997	Nachi-Katsuura	Y. Shimizu, T. Urata	V	4.4 km	MPC; JPL
10230 Andrewnorton	1997 WU_{35}	Andrewnorton	November 29, 1997	Socorro	LINEAR	KOR	5.3 km	MPC; JPL
10231 Penrose	1997 WQ_{37}	Penrose	November 29, 1997	Socorro	LINEAR	·	5.2 km	MPC; JPL
10232	1997 WR_{49}	—	November 26, 1997	Socorro	LINEAR	·	9.3 km	MPC; JPL
10233 Le Creusot	1997 XQ_{2}	Le Creusot	December 5, 1997	Le Creusot	J.-C. Merlin	·	6.1 km	MPC; JPL
10234 Sixtygarden	1997 YB_{8}	Sixtygarden	December 27, 1997	Kleť	J. Tichá, M. Tichý	EOS	9.1 km	MPC; JPL
10235	1998 QR_{37}	—	August 17, 1998	Socorro	LINEAR	·	10 km	MPC; JPL
10236 Aayushkaran	1998 QA_{93}	Aayushkaran	August 28, 1998	Socorro	LINEAR	·	5.4 km	MPC; JPL
10237 Adzic	1998 SJ_{119}	Adzic	September 26, 1998	Socorro	LINEAR	·	2.1 km	MPC; JPL
10238 Ananyakarthik	1998 SO_{140}	Ananyakarthik	September 26, 1998	Socorro	LINEAR	·	3.1 km	MPC; JPL
10239 Hermann	1998 TY_{30}	Hermann	October 10, 1998	Anderson Mesa	LONEOS	·	20 km	MPC; JPL
10240	1998 VW_{34}	—	November 12, 1998	Kushiro	S. Ueda, H. Kaneda	KOR	4.7 km	MPC; JPL
10241 Miličević	1999 AU_{6}	Miličević	January 9, 1999	Višnjan Observatory	K. Korlević	·	11 km	MPC; JPL
10242 Wasserkuppe	2808 P-L	Wasserkuppe	September 24, 1960	Palomar	C. J. van Houten, I. van Houten-Groeneveld, T. Gehrels	NYS	4.2 km	MPC; JPL
10243 Hohe Meissner	3553 P-L	Hohe Meissner	October 22, 1960	Palomar	C. J. van Houten, I. van Houten-Groeneveld, T. Gehrels	DOR	9.9 km	MPC; JPL
10244 Thüringer Wald	4668 P-L	Thüringer Wald	September 26, 1960	Palomar	C. J. van Houten, I. van Houten-Groeneveld, T. Gehrels	·	3.3 km	MPC; JPL
10245 Inselsberg	6071 P-L	Inselsberg	September 24, 1960	Palomar	C. J. van Houten, I. van Houten-Groeneveld, T. Gehrels	GEF	6.3 km	MPC; JPL
10246 Frankenwald	6381 P-L	Frankenwald	September 24, 1960	Palomar	C. J. van Houten, I. van Houten-Groeneveld, T. Gehrels	·	4.1 km	MPC; JPL
10247 Amphiaraos	6629 P-L	Amphiaraos	September 24, 1960	Palomar	C. J. van Houten, I. van Houten-Groeneveld, T. Gehrels	L4	27 km	MPC; JPL
10248 Fichtelgebirge	7639 P-L	Fichtelgebirge	October 17, 1960	Palomar	C. J. van Houten, I. van Houten-Groeneveld, T. Gehrels	·	7.0 km	MPC; JPL
10249 Harz	9515 P-L	Harz	October 17, 1960	Palomar	C. J. van Houten, I. van Houten-Groeneveld, T. Gehrels	·	3.6 km	MPC; JPL
10250 Hellahaasse	1252 T-1	Hellahaasse	March 25, 1971	Palomar	C. J. van Houten, I. van Houten-Groeneveld, T. Gehrels	·	3.5 km	MPC; JPL
10251 Mulisch	3089 T-1	Mulisch	March 26, 1971	Palomar	C. J. van Houten, I. van Houten-Groeneveld, T. Gehrels	·	2.4 km	MPC; JPL
10252 Heidigraf	4164 T-1	Heidigraf	March 26, 1971	Palomar	C. J. van Houten, I. van Houten-Groeneveld, T. Gehrels	KOR	5.8 km	MPC; JPL
10253 Westerwald	2116 T-2	Westerwald	September 29, 1973	Palomar	C. J. van Houten, I. van Houten-Groeneveld, T. Gehrels	·	2.3 km	MPC; JPL
10254 Hunsrück	2314 T-2	Hunsrück	September 29, 1973	Palomar	C. J. van Houten, I. van Houten-Groeneveld, T. Gehrels	·	4.2 km	MPC; JPL
10255 Taunus	3398 T-3	Taunus	October 16, 1977	Palomar	C. J. van Houten, I. van Houten-Groeneveld, T. Gehrels	·	3.2 km	MPC; JPL
10256 Vredevoogd	4157 T-3	Vredevoogd	October 16, 1977	Palomar	C. J. van Houten, I. van Houten-Groeneveld, T. Gehrels	BAP	3.4 km	MPC; JPL
10257 Garecynthia	4333 T-3	Garecynthia	October 16, 1977	Palomar	C. J. van Houten, I. van Houten-Groeneveld, T. Gehrels	CYB	10 km	MPC; JPL
10258 Sárneczky	1940 AB	Sárneczky	January 6, 1940	Konkoly	G. Kulin	·	14 km	MPC; JPL
10259 Osipovyurij	1972 HL	Osipovyurij	April 18, 1972	Nauchnij	T. M. Smirnova	·	22 km	MPC; JPL
10260 Stellaseitz	1972 TC	Stellaseitz	October 4, 1972	Hamburg-Bergedorf	L. Kohoutek	EUN	6.3 km	MPC; JPL
10261 Nikdollezhalʹ	1974 QF_{1}	Nikdollezhalʹ	August 22, 1974	Nauchnij	L. V. Zhuravleva	·	12 km	MPC; JPL
10262 Samoilov	1975 TQ_{3}	Samoilov	October 3, 1975	Nauchnij	L. I. Chernykh	EUN	11 km	MPC; JPL
10263 Vadimsimona	1976 SE_{5}	Vadimsimona	September 24, 1976	Nauchnij	N. S. Chernykh	fast	16 km	MPC; JPL
10264 Marov	1978 PH_{3}	Marov	August 8, 1978	Nauchnij	N. S. Chernykh	THM	13 km	MPC; JPL
10265 Gunnarsson	1978 RY_{6}	Gunnarsson	September 2, 1978	La Silla	C.-I. Lagerkvist	·	6.9 km	MPC; JPL
10266 Vladishukhov	1978 SA_{7}	Vladishukhov	September 26, 1978	Nauchnij	L. V. Zhuravleva	DOR	10 km	MPC; JPL
10267 Giuppone	1978 VD_{7}	Giuppone	November 7, 1978	Palomar	E. F. Helin, S. J. Bus	KOR	4.9 km	MPC; JPL
10268	1979 HW_{6}	—	April 26, 1979	Bickley	Perth Observatory	·	2.9 km	MPC; JPL
10269 Tusi	1979 SU_{11}	Tusi	September 24, 1979	Nauchnij	N. S. Chernykh	THM	16 km	MPC; JPL
10270 Skoglöv	1980 FX_{3}	Skoglöv	March 16, 1980	La Silla	C.-I. Lagerkvist	·	2.7 km	MPC; JPL
10271 Dymond	1980 TV_{2}	Dymond	October 14, 1980	Haute-Provence	H. Debehogne, L. Houziaux	·	4.0 km	MPC; JPL
10272 Yuko	1981 EF_{13}	Yuko	March 1, 1981	Siding Spring	S. J. Bus	·	4.0 km	MPC; JPL
10273 Katvolk	1981 ED_{14}	Katvolk	March 1, 1981	Siding Spring	S. J. Bus	·	2.7 km	MPC; JPL
10274 Larryevans	1981 ET_{15}	Larryevans	March 1, 1981	Siding Spring	S. J. Bus	·	6.0 km	MPC; JPL
10275 Nathankaib	1981 EC_{16}	Nathankaib	March 1, 1981	Siding Spring	S. J. Bus	·	6.7 km	MPC; JPL
10276 Matney	1981 EK_{23}	Matney	March 3, 1981	Siding Spring	S. J. Bus	·	5.7 km	MPC; JPL
10277 Micheli	1981 EC_{27}	Micheli	March 2, 1981	Siding Spring	S. J. Bus	·	8.8 km	MPC; JPL
10278 Virkki	1981 EW_{30}	Virkki	March 2, 1981	Siding Spring	S. J. Bus	slow	2.6 km	MPC; JPL
10279 Rhiannonblaauw	1981 ET_{42}	Rhiannonblaauw	March 2, 1981	Siding Spring	S. J. Bus	NYS	3.7 km	MPC; JPL
10280 Yequanzhi	1981 EA_{43}	Yequanzhi	March 2, 1981	Siding Spring	S. J. Bus	NYS	3.3 km	MPC; JPL
10281 Libourel	1981 EE_{45}	Libourel	March 11, 1981	Siding Spring	S. J. Bus	·	12 km	MPC; JPL
10282 Emilykramer	1981 ET_{46}	Emilykramer	March 2, 1981	Siding Spring	S. J. Bus	·	3.1 km	MPC; JPL
10283 Cromer	1981 JE_{2}	Cromer	May 5, 1981	Palomar	C. S. Shoemaker	NYS	4.7 km	MPC; JPL
10284 Damienlemay	1981 QY_{2}	Damienlemay	August 24, 1981	La Silla	H. Debehogne	KOR	6.8 km	MPC; JPL
10285 Renémichelsen	1982 QX_{1}	Renémichelsen	August 17, 1982	La Silla	C.-I. Lagerkvist	V	3.9 km	MPC; JPL
10286 Shnollia	1982 SM_{6}	Shnollia	September 16, 1982	Nauchnij	L. I. Chernykh	V	4.2 km	MPC; JPL
10287 Smale	1982 UK_{7}	Smale	October 21, 1982	Nauchnij	L. G. Karachkina	·	11 km	MPC; JPL
10288 Saville	1983 WN	Saville	November 28, 1983	Anderson Mesa	E. Bowell	·	8.6 km	MPC; JPL
10289 Geoffperry	1984 QS	Geoffperry	August 24, 1984	Harvard Observatory	Oak Ridge Observatory	(3460)	11 km	MPC; JPL
10290 Kettering	1985 SR	Kettering	September 17, 1985	Harvard Observatory	Oak Ridge Observatory	NYS	4.1 km	MPC; JPL
10291	1985 UT	—	October 20, 1985	Kleť	A. Mrkos	·	22 km	MPC; JPL
10292	1986 PM	—	August 2, 1986	Palomar	INAS	BAP	4.3 km	MPC; JPL
10293 Pribina	1986 TU_{6}	Pribina	October 5, 1986	Piwnice	M. Antal	EOS	11 km	MPC; JPL
10294	1988 AA_{2}	—	January 14, 1988	Kleť	A. Mrkos	·	3.5 km	MPC; JPL
10295 Hippolyta	1988 GB	Hippolyta	April 12, 1988	Palomar	C. S. Shoemaker, E. M. Shoemaker	·	1.6 km	MPC; JPL
10296 Rominadisisto	1988 RQ_{12}	Rominadisisto	September 14, 1988	Cerro Tololo	S. J. Bus	3:2	14 km	MPC; JPL
10297 Lynnejones	1988 RJ_{13}	Lynnejones	September 14, 1988	Cerro Tololo	S. J. Bus	·	6.4 km	MPC; JPL
10298 Jiangchuanhuang	1988 SU_{2}	Jiangchuanhuang	September 16, 1988	Cerro Tololo	S. J. Bus	·	7.9 km	MPC; JPL
10299	1988 VS_{3}	—	November 13, 1988	Gekko	Y. Oshima	ADE ·	12 km	MPC; JPL
10300 Tanakadate	1989 EG_{1}	Tanakadate	March 6, 1989	Geisei	T. Seki	·	3.4 km	MPC; JPL

== 10301–10400 ==
back to top

Designation			Discovery			Properties		Ref
Permanent	Provisional	Named after	Date	Site	Discoverer(s)	Category	Diam.	Ref
10301 Kataoka	1989 FH	Kataoka	March 30, 1989	Kitami	K. Endate, K. Watanabe	·	3.2 km	MPC; JPL
10302	1989 ML	—	June 29, 1989	Palomar	E. F. Helin, J. Alu	AMO	450 m	MPC; JPL
10303 Fréret	1989 RD_{2}	Fréret	September 2, 1989	Haute-Provence	E. W. Elst	·	3.4 km	MPC; JPL
10304 Iwaki	1989 SY	Iwaki	September 30, 1989	Kitami	K. Endate, K. Watanabe	·	5.6 km	MPC; JPL
10305 Grignard	1989 YP_{5}	Grignard	December 29, 1989	Haute-Provence	E. W. Elst	·	11 km	MPC; JPL
10306 Pagnol	1990 QY	Pagnol	August 21, 1990	Haute Provence	E. W. Elst	·	9.9 km	MPC; JPL
10307 Carlschmidt	1990 QX_{1}	Carlschmidt	August 22, 1990	Palomar	H. E. Holt	·	2.9 km	MPC; JPL
10308	1990 QC_{3}	—	August 28, 1990	Palomar	H. E. Holt	·	3.0 km	MPC; JPL
10309	1990 QC_{6}	—	August 23, 1990	Palomar	H. E. Holt	·	3.1 km	MPC; JPL
10310 Delacroix	1990 QZ_{8}	Delacroix	August 16, 1990	La Silla	E. W. Elst	·	7.0 km	MPC; JPL
10311 Fantin-Latour	1990 QL_{9}	Fantin-Latour	August 16, 1990	La Silla	E. W. Elst	KOR	6.1 km	MPC; JPL
10312	1990 QT_{9}	—	August 23, 1990	Palomar	H. E. Holt	·	3.8 km	MPC; JPL
10313 Vanessa-Mae	1990 QW_{17}	Vanessa-Mae	August 26, 1990	Nauchnij	L. V. Zhuravleva	·	2.6 km	MPC; JPL
10314	1990 RF	—	September 14, 1990	Palomar	H. E. Holt	slow	22 km	MPC; JPL
10315 Brewster	1990 SC_{4}	Brewster	September 23, 1990	Palomar	E. F. Helin	·	4.4 km	MPC; JPL
10316 Williamturner	1990 SF_{9}	Williamturner	September 22, 1990	La Silla	E. W. Elst	HYG	13 km	MPC; JPL
10317	1990 SA_{15}	—	September 17, 1990	Palomar	H. E. Holt	(2076)	4.1 km	MPC; JPL
10318 Sumaura	1990 TX	Sumaura	October 15, 1990	Minami-Oda	T. Nomura, K. Kawanishi	·	3.9 km	MPC; JPL
10319 Toshiharu	1990 TB_{1}	Toshiharu	October 11, 1990	Kitami	A. Takahashi, K. Watanabe	·	3.8 km	MPC; JPL
10320 Reiland	1990 TR_{1}	Reiland	October 14, 1990	Palomar	E. F. Helin	V	2.8 km	MPC; JPL
10321 Rampo	1990 UN_{2}	Rampo	October 26, 1990	Geisei	T. Seki	·	3.9 km	MPC; JPL
10322 Mayuminarita	1990 VT_{1}	Mayuminarita	November 11, 1990	Kitami	K. Endate, K. Watanabe	NYS	3.1 km	MPC; JPL
10323 Frazer	1990 VW_{6}	Frazer	November 14, 1990	La Silla	E. W. Elst	·	3.7 km	MPC; JPL
10324 Vladimirov	1990 VB_{14}	Vladimirov	November 14, 1990	Nauchnij	L. G. Karachkina	NYS	3.3 km	MPC; JPL
10325 Bexa	1990 WB_{2}	Bexa	November 18, 1990	La Silla	E. W. Elst	·	4.4 km	MPC; JPL
10326 Kuragano	1990 WS_{2}	Kuragano	November 21, 1990	Kitami	K. Endate, K. Watanabe	NYS	4.4 km	MPC; JPL
10327 Batens	1990 WQ_{6}	Batens	November 21, 1990	La Silla	E. W. Elst	·	3.5 km	MPC; JPL
10328	1991 GC_{1}	—	April 10, 1991	Palomar	E. F. Helin	·	8.8 km	MPC; JPL
10329	1991 GJ_{1}	—	April 11, 1991	Kushiro	S. Ueda, H. Kaneda	EUN	6.1 km	MPC; JPL
10330 Durkheim	1991 GH_{3}	Durkheim	April 8, 1991	La Silla	E. W. Elst	(5)	5.8 km	MPC; JPL
10331 Peterbluhm	1991 GM_{10}	Peterbluhm	April 9, 1991	Tautenburg Observatory	F. Börngen	3:2 · slow	20 km	MPC; JPL
10332 Défi	1991 JT_{1}	Défi	May 13, 1991	Palomar	C. S. Shoemaker, D. H. Levy	·	7.0 km	MPC; JPL
10333 Portnoff	1991 NZ_{6}	Portnoff	July 12, 1991	La Silla	H. Debehogne	·	8.5 km	MPC; JPL
10334 Gibbon	1991 PG_{5}	Gibbon	August 3, 1991	La Silla	E. W. Elst	·	5.7 km	MPC; JPL
10335	1991 PG_{9}	—	August 15, 1991	Palomar	E. F. Helin	GEF	4.5 km	MPC; JPL
10336	1991 PJ_{12}	—	August 7, 1991	Palomar	H. E. Holt	·	12 km	MPC; JPL
10337	1991 RO_{1}	—	September 10, 1991	Dynic	A. Sugie	·	8.5 km	MPC; JPL
10338	1991 RB_{11}	—	September 10, 1991	Palomar	H. E. Holt	·	13 km	MPC; JPL
10339	1991 RK_{17}	—	September 11, 1991	Palomar	H. E. Holt	·	4.9 km	MPC; JPL
10340 Jostjahn	1991 RT_{40}	Jostjahn	September 10, 1991	Tautenburg Observatory	F. Börngen	KOR	7.0 km	MPC; JPL
10341	1991 SC_{2}	—	September 16, 1991	Palomar	H. E. Holt	KOR	6.2 km	MPC; JPL
10342	1991 TQ	—	October 1, 1991	Siding Spring	R. H. McNaught	·	8.3 km	MPC; JPL
10343 Church	1991 VW_{8}	Church	November 4, 1991	Kitt Peak	Spacewatch	THM	10 km	MPC; JPL
10344 Llanodelhato	1992 CA_{2}	Llanodelhato	February 12, 1992	Mérida	Naranjo, O. A., J. Stock	·	3.7 km	MPC; JPL
10345	1992 DC_{11}	—	February 29, 1992	La Silla	UESAC	·	2.1 km	MPC; JPL
10346 Triathlon	1992 GA_{1}	Triathlon	April 2, 1992	Palomar	C. S. Shoemaker, D. H. Levy	PHO	3.8 km	MPC; JPL
10347 Murom	1992 HG_{4}	Murom	April 23, 1992	La Silla	E. W. Elst	·	3.7 km	MPC; JPL
10348 Poelchau	1992 HL_{4}	Poelchau	April 29, 1992	Tautenburg Observatory	F. Börngen	·	4.9 km	MPC; JPL
10349	1992 LN	—	June 3, 1992	Palomar	G. J. Leonard	V	4.2 km	MPC; JPL
10350 Spallanzani	1992 OG_{2}	Spallanzani	July 26, 1992	La Silla	E. W. Elst	·	9.4 km	MPC; JPL
10351 Seiichisato	1992 SE_{1}	Seiichisato	September 23, 1992	Kitami	K. Endate, K. Watanabe	EUN · slow	9.4 km	MPC; JPL
10352 Kawamura	1992 UO_{3}	Kawamura	October 26, 1992	Kitami	K. Endate, K. Watanabe	·	6.8 km	MPC; JPL
10353 Momotaro	1992 YS_{2}	Momotaro	December 20, 1992	Kiyosato	S. Otomo	KOR	8.4 km	MPC; JPL
10354 Guillaumebudé	1993 BU_{5}	Guillaumebudé	January 27, 1993	Caussols	E. W. Elst	·	13 km	MPC; JPL
10355 Kojiroharada	1993 EQ	Kojiroharada	March 15, 1993	Kitami	K. Endate, K. Watanabe	V	4.4 km	MPC; JPL
10356 Rudolfsteiner	1993 RQ_{4}	Rudolfsteiner	September 15, 1993	La Silla	E. W. Elst	·	8.1 km	MPC; JPL
10357	1993 SL_{3}	—	September 19, 1993	Palomar	H. E. Holt	PHO	7.2 km	MPC; JPL
10358 Kirchhoff	1993 TH_{32}	Kirchhoff	October 9, 1993	La Silla	E. W. Elst	NYS	4.5 km	MPC; JPL
10359	1993 TU_{36}	—	October 13, 1993	Palomar	H. E. Holt	·	6.2 km	MPC; JPL
10360	1993 VN	—	November 7, 1993	Kushiro	S. Ueda, H. Kaneda	NYS	5.5 km	MPC; JPL
10361 Bunsen	1994 PR_{20}	Bunsen	August 12, 1994	La Silla	E. W. Elst	·	2.4 km	MPC; JPL
10362	1994 UC_{2}	—	October 31, 1994	Kushiro	S. Ueda, H. Kaneda	·	2.5 km	MPC; JPL
10363	1994 UP_{11}	—	October 31, 1994	Palomar	PCAS	·	3.9 km	MPC; JPL
10364 Tainai	1994 VR_{1}	Tainai	November 3, 1994	Ōizumi	T. Kobayashi	·	3.0 km	MPC; JPL
10365 Kurokawa	1994 WL_{1}	Kurokawa	November 27, 1994	Ōizumi	T. Kobayashi	·	2.5 km	MPC; JPL
10366 Shozosato	1994 WD_{4}	Shozosato	November 24, 1994	Kitami	K. Endate, K. Watanabe	·	3.5 km	MPC; JPL
10367 Sayo	1994 YL_{1}	Sayo	December 31, 1994	Ōizumi	T. Kobayashi	·	3.7 km	MPC; JPL
10368 Kozuki	1995 CM_{1}	Kozuki	February 7, 1995	Ōizumi	T. Kobayashi	·	5.4 km	MPC; JPL
10369 Sinden	1995 CE_{2}	Sinden	February 8, 1995	Siding Spring	D. J. Asher	(10369)	13 km	MPC; JPL
10370 Hylonome	1995 DW_{2}	Hylonome	February 27, 1995	Mauna Kea	D. C. Jewitt, J. X. Luu	centaur	77 km	MPC; JPL
10371 Gigli	1995 DU_{3}	Gigli	February 27, 1995	San Marcello	L. Tesi, A. Boattini	·	1.6 km	MPC; JPL
10372 Moran	1995 FO_{10}	Moran	March 26, 1995	Kitt Peak	Spacewatch	·	8.5 km	MPC; JPL
10373 MacRobert	1996 ER	MacRobert	March 14, 1996	Sudbury	D. di Cicco	·	2.7 km	MPC; JPL
10374 Etampes	1996 GN_{19}	Etampes	April 15, 1996	La Silla	E. W. Elst	slow	4.8 km	MPC; JPL
10375 Michiokuga	1996 HM_{1}	Michiokuga	April 21, 1996	Kuma Kogen	A. Nakamura	NYS ·	3.7 km	MPC; JPL
10376 Chiarini	1996 KW	Chiarini	May 16, 1996	Bologna	San Vittore	·	5.7 km	MPC; JPL
10377 Kilimanjaro	1996 NN_{4}	Kilimanjaro	July 14, 1996	La Silla	E. W. Elst	THM	8.2 km	MPC; JPL
10378 Ingmarbergman	1996 NE_{5}	Ingmarbergman	July 14, 1996	La Silla	E. W. Elst	KOR	6.0 km	MPC; JPL
10379 Lake Placid	1996 OH	Lake Placid	July 18, 1996	Rand	G. R. Viscome	CYB	11 km	MPC; JPL
10380 Berwald	1996 PY_{7}	Berwald	August 8, 1996	La Silla	E. W. Elst	KOR	4.4 km	MPC; JPL
10381 Malinsmith	1996 RB	Malinsmith	September 3, 1996	Stakenbridge	B. G. W. Manning	·	9.6 km	MPC; JPL
10382 Hadamard	1996 RJ_{3}	Hadamard	September 15, 1996	Prescott	P. G. Comba	·	4.1 km	MPC; JPL
10383	1996 SR_{7}	—	September 16, 1996	Church Stretton	S. P. Laurie	LEO	7.4 km	MPC; JPL
10384	1996 TQ_{10}	—	October 9, 1996	Kushiro	S. Ueda, H. Kaneda	EOS · slow	8.5 km	MPC; JPL
10385 Amaterasu	1996 TL_{12}	Amaterasu	October 15, 1996	Nachi-Katsuura	Y. Shimizu, T. Urata	EUN	8.2 km	MPC; JPL
10386 Romulus	1996 TS_{15}	Romulus	October 12, 1996	Colleverde	V. S. Casulli	·	16 km	MPC; JPL
10387 Bepicolombo	1996 UQ	Bepicolombo	October 18, 1996	Sormano	P. Sicoli, F. Manca	EUN	5.7 km	MPC; JPL
10388 Zhuguangya	1996 YH_{3}	Zhuguangya	December 25, 1996	Xinglong	SCAP	URS	22 km	MPC; JPL
10389 Robmanning	1997 LD	Robmanning	June 1, 1997	Haleakalā	NEAT	·	5.0 km	MPC; JPL
10390 Lenka	1997 QD_{1}	Lenka	August 27, 1997	Ondřejov	P. Pravec, M. Wolf	slow?	4.0 km	MPC; JPL
10391	1997 RR_{3}	—	September 5, 1997	Nachi-Katsuura	Y. Shimizu, T. Urata	EUN	8.0 km	MPC; JPL
10392 Brace	1997 RP_{7}	Brace	September 11, 1997	Lime Creek	R. Linderholm	·	4.7 km	MPC; JPL
10393	1997 RF_{8}	—	September 4, 1997	Gekko	T. Kagawa, T. Urata	·	7.4 km	MPC; JPL
10394	1997 SG_{1}	—	September 22, 1997	Giesing	Sala, P.	EUN	6.6 km	MPC; JPL
10395 Jirkahorn	1997 SZ_{1}	Jirkahorn	September 23, 1997	Ondřejov	M. Wolf, P. Pravec	·	7.6 km	MPC; JPL
10396 Yugao	1997 SW_{33}	Yugao	September 17, 1997	Xinglong	SCAP	·	12 km	MPC; JPL
10397 Zhangmingchang	1997 SX_{33}	Zhangmingchang	September 17, 1997	Xinglong	SCAP	THM	8.8 km	MPC; JPL
10398	1997 UP_{8}	—	October 23, 1997	Kushiro	S. Ueda, H. Kaneda	·	4.8 km	MPC; JPL
10399 Nishiharima	1997 UZ_{8}	Nishiharima	October 29, 1997	Ōizumi	T. Kobayashi	·	5.2 km	MPC; JPL
10400 Hakkaisan	1997 VX	Hakkaisan	November 1, 1997	Ōizumi	T. Kobayashi	·	6.1 km	MPC; JPL

== 10401–10500 ==
back to top

Designation			Discovery			Properties		Ref
Permanent	Provisional	Named after	Date	Site	Discoverer(s)	Category	Diam.	Ref
10401 Masakoba	1997 VD_{3}	Masakoba	November 6, 1997	Ōizumi	T. Kobayashi	·	4.5 km	MPC; JPL
10402	1997 VS_{5}	—	November 8, 1997	Ōizumi	T. Kobayashi	·	7.9 km	MPC; JPL
10403 Marcelgrün	1997 WU_{3}	Marcelgrün	November 22, 1997	Kleť	J. Tichá, M. Tichý	(883)	3.6 km	MPC; JPL
10404 McCall	1997 WP_{14}	McCall	November 22, 1997	Kitt Peak	Spacewatch	slow	9.5 km	MPC; JPL
10405 Yoshiaki	1997 WT_{23}	Yoshiaki	November 19, 1997	Nanyo	T. Okuni	NYS	4.4 km	MPC; JPL
10406	1997 WZ_{29}	—	November 24, 1997	Kushiro	S. Ueda, H. Kaneda	·	8.1 km	MPC; JPL
10407	1997 WS_{32}	—	November 29, 1997	Socorro	LINEAR	·	3.1 km	MPC; JPL
10408	1997 WL_{44}	—	November 29, 1997	Socorro	LINEAR	·	8.6 km	MPC; JPL
10409	1997 WP_{44}	—	November 29, 1997	Socorro	LINEAR	THM	11 km	MPC; JPL
10410 Yangguanghua	1997 XR_{9}	Yangguanghua	December 4, 1997	Xinglong	SCAP	·	11 km	MPC; JPL
10411 Boshuren	1997 XO_{11}	Boshuren	December 15, 1997	Xinglong	SCAP	V	3.2 km	MPC; JPL
10412 Tsukuyomi	1997 YO_{4}	Tsukuyomi	December 21, 1997	Nachi-Katsuura	Y. Shimizu, T. Urata	EOS	9.8 km	MPC; JPL
10413 Pansecchi	1997 YG_{20}	Pansecchi	December 29, 1997	Bologna	San Vittore	EOS	8.4 km	MPC; JPL
10414	1998 QJ_{37}	—	August 17, 1998	Socorro	LINEAR	VER	14 km	MPC; JPL
10415 Mali Lošinj	1998 UT_{15}	Mali Lošinj	October 23, 1998	Višnjan Observatory	K. Korlević	slow	14 km	MPC; JPL
10416 Kottler	1998 VA_{32}	Kottler	November 14, 1998	Socorro	LINEAR	·	3.2 km	MPC; JPL
10417	1998 WA_{23}	—	November 18, 1998	Socorro	LINEAR	THM	12 km	MPC; JPL
10418	1998 WZ_{23}	—	November 25, 1998	Socorro	LINEAR	·	6.2 km	MPC; JPL
10419	1998 XB_{4}	—	December 11, 1998	Ōizumi	T. Kobayashi	·	5.6 km	MPC; JPL
10420	1998 YB_{12}	—	December 27, 1998	Ōizumi	T. Kobayashi	·	14 km	MPC; JPL
10421 Dalmatin	1999 AY_{6}	Dalmatin	January 9, 1999	Višnjan Observatory	K. Korlević	NYS	6.1 km	MPC; JPL
10422 Yizhaohua	1999 AN_{22}	Yizhaohua	January 14, 1999	Xinglong	SCAP	·	21 km	MPC; JPL
10423 Dajčić	1999 BB	Dajčić	January 16, 1999	Višnjan Observatory	K. Korlević	·	3.2 km	MPC; JPL
10424 Gaillard	1999 BD_{5}	Gaillard	January 20, 1999	Caussols	ODAS	moon	6.6 km	MPC; JPL
10425 Landfermann	1999 BE_{6}	Landfermann	January 20, 1999	Caussols	ODAS	·	3.8 km	MPC; JPL
10426 Charlierouse	1999 BB_{27}	Charlierouse	January 16, 1999	Kitt Peak	Spacewatch	EUN	9.2 km	MPC; JPL
10427 Klinkenberg	2017 P-L	Klinkenberg	September 24, 1960	Palomar	C. J. van Houten, I. van Houten-Groeneveld, T. Gehrels	·	2.8 km	MPC; JPL
10428 Wanders	2073 P-L	Wanders	September 24, 1960	Palomar	C. J. van Houten, I. van Houten-Groeneveld, T. Gehrels	(5)	2.7 km	MPC; JPL
10429 van Woerden	2546 P-L	van Woerden	September 24, 1960	Palomar	C. J. van Houten, I. van Houten-Groeneveld, T. Gehrels	MAR	4.3 km	MPC; JPL
10430 Martschmidt	4030 P-L	Martschmidt	September 24, 1960	Palomar	C. J. van Houten, I. van Houten-Groeneveld, T. Gehrels	·	5.7 km	MPC; JPL
10431 Pottasch	4042 P-L	Pottasch	September 24, 1960	Palomar	C. J. van Houten, I. van Houten-Groeneveld, T. Gehrels	·	3.1 km	MPC; JPL
10432 Ullischwarz	4623 P-L	Ullischwarz	September 24, 1960	Palomar	C. J. van Houten, I. van Houten-Groeneveld, T. Gehrels	·	3.5 km	MPC; JPL
10433 Ponsen	4716 P-L	Ponsen	September 24, 1960	Palomar	C. J. van Houten, I. van Houten-Groeneveld, T. Gehrels	·	3.6 km	MPC; JPL
10434 Tinbergen	4722 P-L	Tinbergen	September 24, 1960	Palomar	C. J. van Houten, I. van Houten-Groeneveld, T. Gehrels	NYS	3.4 km	MPC; JPL
10435 Tjeerd	6064 P-L	Tjeerd	September 24, 1960	Palomar	C. J. van Houten, I. van Houten-Groeneveld, T. Gehrels	·	5.7 km	MPC; JPL
10436 Janwillempel	6073 P-L	Janwillempel	September 24, 1960	Palomar	C. J. van Houten, I. van Houten-Groeneveld, T. Gehrels	·	3.8 km	MPC; JPL
10437 van der Kruit	6085 P-L	van der Kruit	September 24, 1960	Palomar	C. J. van Houten, I. van Houten-Groeneveld, T. Gehrels	NYS	2.7 km	MPC; JPL
10438 Ludolph	6615 P-L	Ludolph	September 24, 1960	Palomar	C. J. van Houten, I. van Houten-Groeneveld, T. Gehrels	·	3.8 km	MPC; JPL
10439 van Schooten	6676 P-L	van Schooten	September 24, 1960	Palomar	C. J. van Houten, I. van Houten-Groeneveld, T. Gehrels	·	8.1 km	MPC; JPL
10440 van Swinden	7636 P-L	van Swinden	October 17, 1960	Palomar	C. J. van Houten, I. van Houten-Groeneveld, T. Gehrels	·	2.2 km	MPC; JPL
10441 van Rijckevorsel	9076 P-L	van Rijckevorsel	October 17, 1960	Palomar	C. J. van Houten, I. van Houten-Groeneveld, T. Gehrels	EUN · slow	6.6 km	MPC; JPL
10442 Biezenzo	4062 T-1	Biezenzo	March 26, 1971	Palomar	C. J. van Houten, I. van Houten-Groeneveld, T. Gehrels	·	16 km	MPC; JPL
10443 van der Pol	1045 T-2	van der Pol	September 29, 1973	Palomar	C. J. van Houten, I. van Houten-Groeneveld, T. Gehrels	·	3.4 km	MPC; JPL
10444 de Hevesy	3290 T-2	de Hevesy	September 30, 1973	Palomar	C. J. van Houten, I. van Houten-Groeneveld, T. Gehrels	·	13 km	MPC; JPL
10445 Coster	4090 T-2	Coster	September 29, 1973	Palomar	C. J. van Houten, I. van Houten-Groeneveld, T. Gehrels	NYS	3.1 km	MPC; JPL
10446 Siegbahn	3006 T-3	Siegbahn	October 16, 1977	Palomar	C. J. van Houten, I. van Houten-Groeneveld, T. Gehrels	·	8.8 km	MPC; JPL
10447 Bloembergen	3357 T-3	Bloembergen	October 16, 1977	Palomar	C. J. van Houten, I. van Houten-Groeneveld, T. Gehrels	KOR	6.2 km	MPC; JPL
10448 Schawlow	4314 T-3	Schawlow	October 16, 1977	Palomar	C. J. van Houten, I. van Houten-Groeneveld, T. Gehrels	KOR	6.1 km	MPC; JPL
10449 Takuma	1936 UD	Takuma	October 16, 1936	Nice	M. Laugier	·	13 km	MPC; JPL
10450 Girard	1967 JQ	Girard	May 6, 1967	El Leoncito	C. U. Cesco, A. R. Klemola	·	8.8 km	MPC; JPL
10451	1975 SE	—	September 28, 1975	Anderson Mesa	H. L. Giclas	·	7.7 km	MPC; JPL
10452 Zuev	1976 SQ_{7}	Zuev	September 25, 1976	Nauchnij	N. S. Chernykh	·	4.7 km	MPC; JPL
10453 Banzan	1977 DY_{3}	Banzan	February 18, 1977	Kiso	H. Kosai, K. Furukawa	·	10 km	MPC; JPL
10454 Vallenar	1978 NY	Vallenar	July 9, 1978	La Silla	H.-E. Schuster	V	3.1 km	MPC; JPL
10455 Donnison	1978 NU_{3}	Donnison	July 9, 1978	Mount Stromlo	C.-I. Lagerkvist	·	5.3 km	MPC; JPL
10456 Anechka	1978 PS_{2}	Anechka	August 8, 1978	Nauchnij	N. S. Chernykh	·	4.2 km	MPC; JPL
10457 Suminov	1978 QE_{2}	Suminov	August 31, 1978	Nauchnij	N. S. Chernykh	NYS	3.0 km	MPC; JPL
10458 Sfranke	1978 RM_{7}	Sfranke	September 2, 1978	La Silla	C.-I. Lagerkvist	NYS	2.9 km	MPC; JPL
10459 Vladichaika	1978 SJ_{5}	Vladichaika	September 27, 1978	Nauchnij	L. I. Chernykh	·	5.3 km	MPC; JPL
10460 Correa-Otto	1978 VK_{8}	Correa-Otto	November 7, 1978	Palomar	E. F. Helin, S. J. Bus	·	5.0 km	MPC; JPL
10461 Dawilliams	1978 XU	Dawilliams	December 6, 1978	Palomar	E. Bowell, Warnock, A.	fast	5.5 km	MPC; JPL
10462 Saxogrammaticus	1979 KM	Saxogrammaticus	May 19, 1979	La Silla	R. M. West	·	2.3 km	MPC; JPL
10463 Bannister	1979 MB_{9}	Bannister	June 25, 1979	Siding Spring	E. F. Helin, S. J. Bus	THM	11 km	MPC; JPL
10464 Jessie	1979 SC	Jessie	September 17, 1979	Harvard Observatory	Harvard Observatory	·	3.5 km	MPC; JPL
10465 Olkin	1980 WE_{5}	Olkin	November 29, 1980	Palomar	S. J. Bus	·	21 km	MPC; JPL
10466 Marius-Ioan	1981 ET_{7}	Marius-Ioan	March 1, 1981	Siding Spring	S. J. Bus	·	2.6 km	MPC; JPL
10467 Peterbus	1981 EZ_{7}	Peterbus	March 1, 1981	Siding Spring	S. J. Bus	·	5.8 km	MPC; JPL
10468 Itacuruba	1981 EH_{9}	Itacuruba	March 1, 1981	Siding Spring	S. J. Bus	·	2.9 km	MPC; JPL
10469 Krohn	1981 EE_{14}	Krohn	March 1, 1981	Siding Spring	S. J. Bus	·	2.5 km	MPC; JPL
10470 Bartczak	1981 EW_{18}	Bartczak	March 2, 1981	Siding Spring	S. J. Bus	V	2.1 km	MPC; JPL
10471 Marciniak	1981 EH_{20}	Marciniak	March 2, 1981	Siding Spring	S. J. Bus	·	3.8 km	MPC; JPL
10472 Santana-Ros	1981 EO_{20}	Santana-Ros	March 2, 1981	Siding Spring	S. J. Bus	NYS	3.1 km	MPC; JPL
10473 Thirouin	1981 EL_{21}	Thirouin	March 2, 1981	Siding Spring	S. J. Bus	·	8.0 km	MPC; JPL
10474 Pecina	1981 EJ_{23}	Pecina	March 3, 1981	Siding Spring	S. J. Bus	·	3.5 km	MPC; JPL
10475 Maxpoilâne	1981 EX_{28}	Maxpoilâne	March 1, 1981	Siding Spring	S. J. Bus	V	2.1 km	MPC; JPL
10476 Los Molinos	1981 EY_{38}	Los Molinos	March 2, 1981	Siding Spring	S. J. Bus	slow	2.9 km	MPC; JPL
10477 Lacumparsita	1981 ET_{41}	Lacumparsita	March 2, 1981	Siding Spring	S. J. Bus	·	3.0 km	MPC; JPL
10478 Alsabti	1981 WO	Alsabti	November 24, 1981	Anderson Mesa	E. Bowell	EOS	11 km	MPC; JPL
10479 Yiqunchen	1982 HJ	Yiqunchen	April 18, 1982	Anderson Mesa	Watt, M.	·	5.2 km	MPC; JPL
10480 Jennyblue	1982 JB_{2}	Jennyblue	May 15, 1982	Palomar	Palomar	·	3.2 km	MPC; JPL
10481 Esipov	1982 QK_{3}	Esipov	August 23, 1982	Nauchnij	N. S. Chernykh	·	8.3 km	MPC; JPL
10482 Dangrieser	1983 RG_{2}	Dangrieser	September 14, 1983	Anderson Mesa	E. Bowell	·	3.6 km	MPC; JPL
10483 Tomburns	1983 RP_{2}	Tomburns	September 4, 1983	Anderson Mesa	E. Bowell	·	3.5 km	MPC; JPL
10484 Hecht	1983 WM	Hecht	November 28, 1983	Anderson Mesa	E. Bowell	V	4.6 km	MPC; JPL
10485 Sarahyeomans	1984 SY_{5}	Sarahyeomans	September 21, 1984	La Silla	H. Debehogne	THM	12 km	MPC; JPL
10486 Teron	1985 CS_{2}	Teron	February 15, 1985	La Silla	H. Debehogne	·	3.1 km	MPC; JPL
10487 Danpeterson	1985 GP_{1}	Danpeterson	April 14, 1985	Palomar	C. S. Shoemaker, E. M. Shoemaker	PHO	5.7 km	MPC; JPL
10488	1985 RS_{1}	—	September 12, 1985	Zimmerwald	P. Wild	NYS	4.7 km	MPC; JPL
10489 Keinonen	1985 TJ_{1}	Keinonen	October 15, 1985	Anderson Mesa	E. Bowell	EOS	11 km	MPC; JPL
10490	1985 VL	—	November 14, 1985	Brorfelde	P. Jensen	·	18 km	MPC; JPL
10491 Chou	1986 QS_{1}	Chou	August 27, 1986	La Silla	H. Debehogne	·	3.4 km	MPC; JPL
10492 Mizzi	1986 QZ_{1}	Mizzi	August 28, 1986	La Silla	H. Debehogne	EOS	9.7 km	MPC; JPL
10493 Pulliah	1986 QH_{2}	Pulliah	August 28, 1986	La Silla	H. Debehogne	V	3.1 km	MPC; JPL
10494 Jenniferwest	1986 QO_{3}	Jenniferwest	August 29, 1986	La Silla	H. Debehogne	NYS	3.3 km	MPC; JPL
10495	1986 RD	—	September 8, 1986	Brorfelde	P. Jensen	DOR	12 km	MPC; JPL
10496	1986 RK	—	September 11, 1986	Brorfelde	P. Jensen	·	5.2 km	MPC; JPL
10497	1986 RQ	—	September 11, 1986	Brorfelde	P. Jensen	·	6.4 km	MPC; JPL
10498 Bobgent	1986 RG_{3}	Bobgent	September 11, 1986	Anderson Mesa	E. Bowell	·	2.7 km	MPC; JPL
10499 Sarty	1986 RN_{5}	Sarty	September 7, 1986	La Silla	H. Debehogne	·	3.5 km	MPC; JPL
10500 Nishi-koen	1987 GA	Nishi-koen	April 3, 1987	Ayashi Station	M. Koishikawa	·	7.5 km	MPC; JPL

== 10501–10600 ==
back to top

Designation			Discovery			Properties		Ref
Permanent	Provisional	Named after	Date	Site	Discoverer(s)	Category	Diam.	Ref
10501 Ardmacha	1987 OT	Ardmacha	July 19, 1987	Palomar	E. F. Helin	·	5.9 km	MPC; JPL
10502 Armaghobs	1987 QF_{6}	Armaghobs	August 22, 1987	Palomar	E. F. Helin	·	2.6 km	MPC; JPL
10503 Johnmarks	1987 SG_{13}	Johnmarks	September 27, 1987	La Silla	H. Debehogne	(254)	4.0 km	MPC; JPL
10504 Doga	1987 UF_{5}	Doga	October 22, 1987	Nauchnij	L. V. Zhuravleva	MRX	7.0 km	MPC; JPL
10505 Johnnycash	1988 BN_{4}	Johnnycash	January 22, 1988	La Silla	H. Debehogne	EOS ·	11 km	MPC; JPL
10506 Rydberg	1988 CW_{4}	Rydberg	February 13, 1988	La Silla	E. W. Elst	slow	13 km	MPC; JPL
10507	1988 ER_{1}	—	March 13, 1988	Brorfelde	P. Jensen	V	4.6 km	MPC; JPL
10508 Haughey	1988 RM_{4}	Haughey	September 1, 1988	La Silla	H. Debehogne	·	6.7 km	MPC; JPL
10509 Heinrichkayser	1989 GD_{4}	Heinrichkayser	April 3, 1989	La Silla	E. W. Elst	·	14 km	MPC; JPL
10510 Maxschreier	1989 GQ_{4}	Maxschreier	April 3, 1989	La Silla	E. W. Elst	·	2.7 km	MPC; JPL
10511	1989 OD	—	July 21, 1989	Siding Spring	R. H. McNaught	GEF	7.9 km	MPC; JPL
10512 Yamandu	1989 TP_{11}	Yamandu	October 2, 1989	Cerro Tololo	S. J. Bus	·	10 km	MPC; JPL
10513 Mackie	1989 TJ_{14}	Mackie	October 2, 1989	La Silla	H. Debehogne	·	18 km	MPC; JPL
10514 Harlow	1989 TD_{16}	Harlow	October 4, 1989	La Silla	H. Debehogne	·	15 km	MPC; JPL
10515 Old Joe	1989 UB_{3}	Old Joe	October 31, 1989	Stakenbridge	B. G. W. Manning	(5)	3.4 km	MPC; JPL
10516 Sakurajima	1989 VQ	Sakurajima	November 1, 1989	Kagoshima	M. Mukai, Takeishi, M.	NYS	4.0 km	MPC; JPL
10517	1990 BH_{1}	—	January 28, 1990	Kushiro	S. Ueda, H. Kaneda	·	8.2 km	MPC; JPL
10518	1990 MC	—	June 18, 1990	Palomar	H. E. Holt	·	6.8 km	MPC; JPL
10519	1990 RO_{2}	—	September 15, 1990	Palomar	H. E. Holt	·	3.0 km	MPC; JPL
10520	1990 RS_{2}	—	September 15, 1990	Palomar	H. E. Holt	·	8.7 km	MPC; JPL
10521 Jeremyhansen	1990 RW_{7}	Jeremyhansen	September 14, 1990	La Silla	H. Debehogne	·	8.6 km	MPC; JPL
10522	1990 SN_{3}	—	September 18, 1990	Palomar	H. E. Holt	·	4.3 km	MPC; JPL
10523 D'Haveloose	1990 SM_{6}	D'Haveloose	September 22, 1990	La Silla	E. W. Elst	·	5.3 km	MPC; JPL
10524 Maniewski	1990 SZ_{7}	Maniewski	September 22, 1990	La Silla	E. W. Elst	·	4.2 km	MPC; JPL
10525	1990 TO	—	October 12, 1990	Siding Spring	R. H. McNaught	·	4.1 km	MPC; JPL
10526 Ginkogino	1990 UK_{1}	Ginkogino	October 19, 1990	Okutama	Hioki, T., Hayakawa, S.	slow	3.0 km	MPC; JPL
10527	1990 UN_{1}	—	October 20, 1990	Dynic	A. Sugie	·	8.1 km	MPC; JPL
10528	1990 VX_{3}	—	November 12, 1990	Kushiro	S. Ueda, H. Kaneda	·	5.4 km	MPC; JPL
10529 Giessenburg	1990 WQ_{4}	Giessenburg	November 16, 1990	La Silla	E. W. Elst	·	4.2 km	MPC; JPL
10530	1991 EA	—	March 7, 1991	Kushiro	S. Ueda, H. Kaneda	V · slow	5.1 km	MPC; JPL
10531	1991 GB_{1}	—	April 8, 1991	Palomar	E. F. Helin	H	2.1 km	MPC; JPL
10532	1991 NA_{2}	—	July 14, 1991	Palomar	H. E. Holt	·	8.9 km	MPC; JPL
10533	1991 PT_{12}	—	August 5, 1991	Palomar	H. E. Holt	AST	11 km	MPC; JPL
10534	1991 PV_{16}	—	August 7, 1991	Palomar	H. E. Holt	KOR	6.0 km	MPC; JPL
10535	1991 RB_{1}	—	September 10, 1991	Dynic	A. Sugie	·	7.9 km	MPC; JPL
10536	1991 RZ_{8}	—	September 11, 1991	Palomar	H. E. Holt	KOR	6.2 km	MPC; JPL
10537	1991 RY_{16}	—	September 15, 1991	Palomar	H. E. Holt	·	7.9 km	MPC; JPL
10538 Torode	1991 VP_{2}	Torode	November 11, 1991	Stakenbridge	B. G. W. Manning	·	1.6 km	MPC; JPL
10539	1991 VH_{4}	—	November 9, 1991	Kushiro	S. Ueda, H. Kaneda	·	12 km	MPC; JPL
10540 Hachigoroh	1991 VP_{4}	Hachigoroh	November 13, 1991	Kiyosato	S. Otomo	HYG	11 km	MPC; JPL
10541 Malesherbes	1991 YX	Malesherbes	December 31, 1991	Haute-Provence	E. W. Elst	(2076)	4.4 km	MPC; JPL
10542 Ruckers	1992 CN_{3}	Ruckers	February 2, 1992	La Silla	E. W. Elst	·	7.4 km	MPC; JPL
10543 Klee	1992 DL_{4}	Klee	February 27, 1992	Tautenburg Observatory	F. Börngen	·	2.7 km	MPC; JPL
10544 Hörsnebara	1992 DA_{9}	Hörsnebara	February 29, 1992	La Silla	UESAC	·	3.7 km	MPC; JPL
10545 Källunge	1992 EQ_{9}	Källunge	March 2, 1992	La Silla	UESAC	·	2.9 km	MPC; JPL
10546 Nakanomakoto	1992 FS_{1}	Nakanomakoto	March 28, 1992	Kitami	K. Endate, K. Watanabe	·	4.2 km	MPC; JPL
10547 Yosakoi	1992 JF	Yosakoi	May 2, 1992	Geisei	T. Seki	·	4.4 km	MPC; JPL
10548	1992 PJ_{2}	—	August 2, 1992	Palomar	H. E. Holt	·	5.1 km	MPC; JPL
10549 Helsingborg	1992 RM_{2}	Helsingborg	September 2, 1992	La Silla	E. W. Elst	EUN	4.2 km	MPC; JPL
10550 Malmö	1992 RK_{7}	Malmö	September 2, 1992	La Silla	E. W. Elst	·	6.8 km	MPC; JPL
10551 Göteborg	1992 YL_{2}	Göteborg	December 18, 1992	Caussols	E. W. Elst	EOS · slow	15 km	MPC; JPL
10552 Stockholm	1993 BH_{13}	Stockholm	January 22, 1993	La Silla	E. W. Elst	·	9.6 km	MPC; JPL
10553 Stenkumla	1993 FZ_{4}	Stenkumla	March 17, 1993	La Silla	UESAC	THM	8.8 km	MPC; JPL
10554 Västerhejde	1993 FO_{34}	Västerhejde	March 19, 1993	La Silla	UESAC	·	11 km	MPC; JPL
10555 Tagaharue	1993 HH	Tagaharue	April 16, 1993	Kitami	K. Endate, K. Watanabe	URS	16 km	MPC; JPL
10556	1993 QS	—	August 19, 1993	Palomar	E. F. Helin	·	5.6 km	MPC; JPL
10557 Rowland	1993 RL_{5}	Rowland	September 15, 1993	La Silla	E. W. Elst	·	6.1 km	MPC; JPL
10558 Karlstad	1993 RB_{7}	Karlstad	September 15, 1993	La Silla	E. W. Elst	·	3.5 km	MPC; JPL
10559 Yukihisa	1993 SJ_{1}	Yukihisa	September 16, 1993	Kitami	K. Endate, K. Watanabe	·	3.1 km	MPC; JPL
10560 Michinari	1993 TN	Michinari	October 8, 1993	Kitami	K. Endate, K. Watanabe	·	5.5 km	MPC; JPL
10561 Shimizumasahiro	1993 TE_{2}	Shimizumasahiro	October 15, 1993	Kitami	K. Endate, K. Watanabe	GEF	10 km	MPC; JPL
10562	1993 UB_{1}	—	October 19, 1993	Palomar	E. F. Helin	PHO	6.9 km	MPC; JPL
10563 Izhdubar	1993 WD	Izhdubar	November 19, 1993	Palomar	C. S. Shoemaker, E. M. Shoemaker	APO +1km	1.5 km	MPC; JPL
10564	1993 XQ_{2}	—	December 14, 1993	Palomar	PCAS	EUN	7.0 km	MPC; JPL
10565	1994 AT_{1}	—	January 9, 1994	Fujieda	Shiozawa, H., T. Urata	·	14 km	MPC; JPL
10566 Zabadak	1994 AZ_{2}	Zabadak	January 14, 1994	Yatsugatake	Y. Kushida, O. Muramatsu	·	5.7 km	MPC; JPL
10567 Francobressan	1994 CV	Francobressan	February 7, 1994	Farra d'Isonzo	Farra d'Isonzo	(5)	4.7 km	MPC; JPL
10568 Yoshitanaka	1994 CF_{1}	Yoshitanaka	February 2, 1994	Kiyosato	S. Otomo	EUN	6.2 km	MPC; JPL
10569 Kinoshitamasao	1994 GQ	Kinoshitamasao	April 8, 1994	Kitami	K. Endate, K. Watanabe	·	10 km	MPC; JPL
10570 Shibayasuo	1994 GT	Shibayasuo	April 8, 1994	Kitami	K. Endate, K. Watanabe	·	7.7 km	MPC; JPL
10571	1994 LA_{1}	—	June 5, 1994	Catalina Station	C. W. Hergenrother	EUP	8.2 km	MPC; JPL
10572 Kominejo	1994 VO_{7}	Kominejo	November 8, 1994	Kiyosato	S. Otomo	·	3.1 km	MPC; JPL
10573 Piani	1994 WU_{1}	Piani	November 29, 1994	Stroncone	Santa Lucia	PHO	4.7 km	MPC; JPL
10574	1994 YH_{1}	—	December 31, 1994	Ōizumi	T. Kobayashi	·	1.9 km	MPC; JPL
10575	1994 YV_{1}	—	December 31, 1994	Ōizumi	T. Kobayashi	V · slow	3.2 km	MPC; JPL
10576	1995 GF	—	April 3, 1995	Ōizumi	T. Kobayashi	·	2.7 km	MPC; JPL
10577 Jihčesmuzeum	1995 JC	Jihčesmuzeum	May 2, 1995	Kleť	M. Tichý	·	4.4 km	MPC; JPL
10578	1995 LH	—	June 5, 1995	Siding Spring	G. J. Garradd	·	6.1 km	MPC; JPL
10579 Diluca	1995 OE	Diluca	July 20, 1995	Bologna	San Vittore	EOS	12 km	MPC; JPL
10580	1995 OV	—	July 24, 1995	Nachi-Katsuura	Y. Shimizu, T. Urata	·	4.4 km	MPC; JPL
10581 Jeníkhollan	1995 OD_{1}	Jeníkhollan	July 30, 1995	Ondřejov	P. Pravec	·	9.3 km	MPC; JPL
10582 Harumi	1995 TG	Harumi	October 3, 1995	Moriyama	Ikari, Y.	·	15 km	MPC; JPL
10583 Kanetugu	1995 WC_{4}	Kanetugu	November 21, 1995	Nanyo	T. Okuni	·	21 km	MPC; JPL
10584 Ferrini	1996 GJ_{2}	Ferrini	April 14, 1996	San Marcello	L. Tesi, A. Boattini	·	3.3 km	MPC; JPL
10585 Wabi-Sabi	1996 GD_{21}	Wabi-Sabi	April 13, 1996	Kitt Peak	Spacewatch	·	1.9 km	MPC; JPL
10586 Jansteen	1996 KY_{4}	Jansteen	May 22, 1996	La Silla	E. W. Elst	slow	4.3 km	MPC; JPL
10587 Strindberg	1996 NF_{3}	Strindberg	July 14, 1996	La Silla	E. W. Elst	·	5.7 km	MPC; JPL
10588 Adamcrandall	1996 OE	Adamcrandall	July 18, 1996	Prescott	P. G. Comba	·	2.5 km	MPC; JPL
10589 Giusimicela	1996 OM_{2}	Giusimicela	July 23, 1996	Campo Imperatore	A. Boattini, A. Di Paola	·	4.3 km	MPC; JPL
10590 Ragazzoni	1996 OP_{2}	Ragazzoni	July 24, 1996	Campo Imperatore	A. Boattini, A. Di Paola	PHO	4.0 km	MPC; JPL
10591 Caverni	1996 PD_{3}	Caverni	August 13, 1996	Montelupo	M. Tombelli, G. Forti	·	5.3 km	MPC; JPL
10592 Chakrabarty	1996 PN_{5}	Chakrabarty	August 10, 1996	Haleakalā	NEAT	·	4.8 km	MPC; JPL
10593 Susannesandra	1996 QQ_{1}	Susannesandra	August 25, 1996	King City, Ontario Observatory	Sandness, R. G.	THM	14 km	MPC; JPL
10594	1996 RE_{4}	—	September 10, 1996	Xinglong	SCAP	·	6.5 km	MPC; JPL
10595	1996 SS_{6}	—	September 21, 1996	Xinglong	SCAP	KOR	6.7 km	MPC; JPL
10596 Stevensimpson	1996 TS	Stevensimpson	October 4, 1996	Sudbury	D. di Cicco	KOR	4.7 km	MPC; JPL
10597	1996 TR_{10}	—	October 9, 1996	Kushiro	S. Ueda, H. Kaneda	·	13 km	MPC; JPL
10598 Markrees	1996 TT_{11}	Markrees	October 13, 1996	Prescott	P. G. Comba	·	3.7 km	MPC; JPL
10599	1996 TK_{15}	—	October 9, 1996	Kushiro	S. Ueda, H. Kaneda	EUN	4.2 km	MPC; JPL
10600	1996 TK_{48}	—	October 9, 1996	Kushiro	S. Ueda, H. Kaneda	·	4.0 km	MPC; JPL

== 10601–10700 ==
back to top

Designation			Discovery			Properties		Ref
Permanent	Provisional	Named after	Date	Site	Discoverer(s)	Category	Diam.	Ref
10601 Hiwatashi	1996 UC	Hiwatashi	October 16, 1996	Kuma Kogen	A. Nakamura	·	12 km	MPC; JPL
10602 Masakazu	1996 UG_{3}	Masakazu	October 16, 1996	Kiyosato	S. Otomo	EUN	7.6 km	MPC; JPL
10603	1996 UF_{4}	—	October 29, 1996	Xinglong	SCAP	AGN	4.6 km	MPC; JPL
10604 Susanoo	1996 VJ	Susanoo	November 3, 1996	Oohira	T. Urata	·	12 km	MPC; JPL
10605 Guidoni	1996 VC_{1}	Guidoni	November 3, 1996	Sormano	Giuliani, V., F. Manca	KOR	6.3 km	MPC; JPL
10606 Crocco	1996 VD_{1}	Crocco	November 3, 1996	Sormano	Giuliani, V., F. Manca	·	10 km	MPC; JPL
10607 Amandahatton	1996 VQ_{6}	Amandahatton	November 13, 1996	Prescott	P. G. Comba	EUN	5.5 km	MPC; JPL
10608 Mameta	1996 VB_{9}	Mameta	November 7, 1996	Kitami	K. Endate, K. Watanabe	T_{j} (2.99) · 3:2	25 km	MPC; JPL
10609 Hirai	1996 WC_{3}	Hirai	November 28, 1996	Kuma Kogen	A. Nakamura	·	4.9 km	MPC; JPL
10610	1996 XR_{1}	—	December 2, 1996	Ōizumi	T. Kobayashi	3:2	23 km	MPC; JPL
10611 Yanjici	1997 BB_{1}	Yanjici	January 23, 1997	Xinglong	SCAP	·	17 km	MPC; JPL
10612 Houffalize	1997 JR_{17}	Houffalize	May 3, 1997	La Silla	E. W. Elst	KOR	6.0 km	MPC; JPL
10613 Kushinadahime	1997 RO_{3}	Kushinadahime	September 4, 1997	Nachi-Katsuura	Y. Shimizu, T. Urata	·	3.1 km	MPC; JPL
10614	1997 UH_{1}	—	October 21, 1997	Nachi-Katsuura	Y. Shimizu, T. Urata	V	4.4 km	MPC; JPL
10615	1997 UK_{3}	—	October 26, 1997	Ōizumi	T. Kobayashi	·	4.2 km	MPC; JPL
10616 Inouetakeshi	1997 UW_{8}	Inouetakeshi	October 25, 1997	Kitami	K. Endate, K. Watanabe	·	4.7 km	MPC; JPL
10617 Takumi	1997 UK_{24}	Takumi	October 25, 1997	Nyukasa	M. Hirasawa, S. Suzuki	·	4.5 km	MPC; JPL
10618	1997 VU_{3}	—	November 6, 1997	Ōizumi	T. Kobayashi	·	3.0 km	MPC; JPL
10619 Ninigi	1997 WO_{13}	Ninigi	November 27, 1997	Gekko	T. Kagawa, T. Urata	V	3.7 km	MPC; JPL
10620	1997 WQ_{34}	—	November 29, 1997	Socorro	LINEAR	·	3.5 km	MPC; JPL
10621	1997 XN	—	December 3, 1997	Ōizumi	T. Kobayashi	·	5.1 km	MPC; JPL
10622	1997 XA_{12}	—	December 5, 1997	Socorro	LINEAR	·	2.9 km	MPC; JPL
10623	1997 YP_{7}	—	December 27, 1997	Ōizumi	T. Kobayashi	HYG	15 km	MPC; JPL
10624	1997 YR_{13}	—	December 31, 1997	Ōizumi	T. Kobayashi	THM	12 km	MPC; JPL
10625	1998 AC_{8}	—	January 2, 1998	Socorro	LINEAR	THM	13 km	MPC; JPL
10626 Zajíc	1998 AP_{8}	Zajíc	January 10, 1998	Ondřejov	L. Kotková	·	4.2 km	MPC; JPL
10627 Ookuninushi	1998 BW_{2}	Ookuninushi	January 19, 1998	Nachi-Katsuura	Y. Shimizu, T. Urata	·	9.2 km	MPC; JPL
10628 Feuerbacher	1998 BD_{5}	Feuerbacher	January 18, 1998	Caussols	ODAS	HYG	11 km	MPC; JPL
10629 Krishnamani	1998 BK_{11}	Krishnamani	January 23, 1998	Socorro	LINEAR	·	5.8 km	MPC; JPL
10630	1998 BV_{12}	—	January 23, 1998	Socorro	LINEAR	KOR	4.4 km	MPC; JPL
10631 Koppes	1998 BM_{15}	Koppes	January 24, 1998	Haleakalā	NEAT	·	17 km	MPC; JPL
10632	1998 CV_{1}	—	February 1, 1998	Xinglong	SCAP	3:2	20 km	MPC; JPL
10633 Akimasa	1998 DP_{1}	Akimasa	February 20, 1998	Ondřejov	P. Pravec	V	3.4 km	MPC; JPL
10634 Pepibican	1998 GM_{1}	Pepibican	April 8, 1998	Ondřejov	L. Kotková	·	4.6 km	MPC; JPL
10635 Chiragkumar	1998 QH_{8}	Chiragkumar	August 17, 1998	Socorro	LINEAR	EOS	5.9 km	MPC; JPL
10636	1998 QK_{56}	—	August 28, 1998	Socorro	LINEAR	APO +1km	530 m	MPC; JPL
10637 Heimlich	1998 QP_{104}	Heimlich	August 26, 1998	La Silla	E. W. Elst	·	14 km	MPC; JPL
10638 McGlothlin	1998 SV_{54}	McGlothlin	September 16, 1998	Anderson Mesa	LONEOS	·	15 km	MPC; JPL
10639 Gleason	1998 VV_{41}	Gleason	November 14, 1998	Kitt Peak	Spacewatch	·	3.8 km	MPC; JPL
10640 Varunkumar	1998 WU_{19}	Varunkumar	November 25, 1998	Socorro	LINEAR	·	4.0 km	MPC; JPL
10641	1998 XS_{52}	—	December 14, 1998	Socorro	LINEAR	THM	9.2 km	MPC; JPL
10642 Charmaine	1999 BF_{8}	Charmaine	January 19, 1999	San Marcello	A. Boattini, L. Tesi	·	14 km	MPC; JPL
10643	1999 CE_{78}	—	February 12, 1999	Socorro	LINEAR	·	6.2 km	MPC; JPL
10644	1999 DM_{2}	—	February 19, 1999	Ōizumi	T. Kobayashi	·	9.5 km	MPC; JPL
10645 Brač	1999 ES_{4}	Brač	March 14, 1999	Višnjan Observatory	K. Korlević	EUN	10 km	MPC; JPL
10646 Machielalberts	2077 P-L	Machielalberts	September 26, 1960	Palomar	C. J. van Houten, I. van Houten-Groeneveld, T. Gehrels	·	4.5 km	MPC; JPL
10647 Meesters	3074 P-L	Meesters	September 25, 1960	Palomar	C. J. van Houten, I. van Houten-Groeneveld	EOS	7.7 km	MPC; JPL
10648 Plancius	4089 P-L	Plancius	September 24, 1960	Palomar	C. J. van Houten, I. van Houten-Groeneveld, T. Gehrels	GEF	4.4 km	MPC; JPL
10649 VOC	4098 P-L	VOC	September 24, 1960	Palomar	C. J. van Houten, I. van Houten-Groeneveld, T. Gehrels	GEF	3.2 km	MPC; JPL
10650 Houtman	4110 P-L	Houtman	September 24, 1960	Palomar	C. J. van Houten, I. van Houten-Groeneveld	·	2.2 km	MPC; JPL
10651 van Linschoten	4522 P-L	van Linschoten	September 24, 1960	Palomar	C. J. van Houten, I. van Houten-Groeneveld, T. Gehrels	PAD	7.9 km	MPC; JPL
10652 Blaeu	4599 P-L	Blaeu	September 24, 1960	Palomar	C. J. van Houten, I. van Houten-Groeneveld, T. Gehrels	·	5.8 km	MPC; JPL
10653 Witsen	6030 P-L	Witsen	September 24, 1960	Palomar	C. J. van Houten, I. van Houten-Groeneveld, T. Gehrels	CYB	20 km	MPC; JPL
10654 Bontekoe	6673 P-L	Bontekoe	September 24, 1960	Palomar	C. J. van Houten, I. van Houten-Groeneveld, T. Gehrels	(10654)	14 km	MPC; JPL
10655 Pietkeyser	9535 P-L	Pietkeyser	October 17, 1960	Palomar	C. J. van Houten, I. van Houten-Groeneveld, T. Gehrels	·	4.2 km	MPC; JPL
10656 Albrecht	2213 T-1	Albrecht	March 25, 1971	Palomar	C. J. van Houten, I. van Houten-Groeneveld, T. Gehrels	·	7.1 km	MPC; JPL
10657 Wanach	2251 T-1	Wanach	March 25, 1971	Palomar	C. J. van Houten, I. van Houten-Groeneveld, T. Gehrels	AGN	3.6 km	MPC; JPL
10658 Gretadevries	2281 T-1	Gretadevries	March 25, 1971	Palomar	C. J. van Houten, I. van Houten-Groeneveld, T. Gehrels	HOF	11 km	MPC; JPL
10659 Sauerland	3266 T-1	Sauerland	March 26, 1971	Palomar	C. J. van Houten, I. van Houten-Groeneveld, T. Gehrels	THM	7.5 km	MPC; JPL
10660 Felixhormuth	4348 T-1	Felixhormuth	March 26, 1971	Palomar	C. J. van Houten, I. van Houten-Groeneveld, T. Gehrels	·	7.2 km	MPC; JPL
10661 Teutoburgerwald	1211 T-2	Teutoburgerwald	September 29, 1973	Palomar	C. J. van Houten, I. van Houten-Groeneveld, T. Gehrels	·	5.0 km	MPC; JPL
10662 Peterwisse	3201 T-2	Peterwisse	September 30, 1973	Palomar	C. J. van Houten, I. van Houten-Groeneveld, T. Gehrels	·	6.2 km	MPC; JPL
10663 Schwarzwald	4283 T-2	Schwarzwald	September 29, 1973	Palomar	C. J. van Houten, I. van Houten-Groeneveld, T. Gehrels	THM	8.9 km	MPC; JPL
10664 Phemios	5187 T-2	Phemios	September 25, 1973	Palomar	C. J. van Houten, I. van Houten-Groeneveld, T. Gehrels	L4	31 km	MPC; JPL
10665 Ortigão	3019 T-3	Ortigão	October 16, 1977	Palomar	C. J. van Houten, I. van Houten-Groeneveld, T. Gehrels	GEF	7.1 km	MPC; JPL
10666 Feldberg	4171 T-3	Feldberg	October 16, 1977	Palomar	C. J. van Houten, I. van Houten-Groeneveld, T. Gehrels	·	4.0 km	MPC; JPL
10667 van Marxveldt	1975 UA	van Marxveldt	October 28, 1975	Palomar	T. Gehrels	H	2.0 km	MPC; JPL
10668 Plansos	1976 UB_{1}	Plansos	October 24, 1976	La Silla	R. M. West	·	11 km	MPC; JPL
10669 Herfordia	1977 FN	Herfordia	March 16, 1977	La Silla	H.-E. Schuster	EUN	6.6 km	MPC; JPL
10670 Seminozhenko	1977 PP_{1}	Seminozhenko	August 14, 1977	Nauchnij	N. S. Chernykh	·	12 km	MPC; JPL
10671 Mazurova	1977 RR_{6}	Mazurova	September 11, 1977	Nauchnij	N. S. Chernykh	·	4.6 km	MPC; JPL
10672 Kostyukova	1978 QE	Kostyukova	August 31, 1978	Nauchnij	N. S. Chernykh	·	22 km	MPC; JPL
10673 Berezhnoy	1978 VU_{5}	Berezhnoy	November 7, 1978	Palomar	E. F. Helin, S. J. Bus	·	3.8 km	MPC; JPL
10674 de Elía	1978 VT_{10}	de Elía	November 7, 1978	Palomar	E. F. Helin, S. J. Bus	·	7.1 km	MPC; JPL
10675 Kharlamov	1978 VE_{15}	Kharlamov	November 1, 1978	Nauchnij	L. V. Zhuravleva	NYS	3.3 km	MPC; JPL
10676 Jamesmcdanell	1979 MD_{2}	Jamesmcdanell	June 25, 1979	Siding Spring	E. F. Helin, S. J. Bus	·	3.4 km	MPC; JPL
10677 Colucci	1979 MN_{3}	Colucci	June 25, 1979	Siding Spring	E. F. Helin, S. J. Bus	·	3.6 km	MPC; JPL
10678 Alilagoa	1979 MG_{6}	Alilagoa	June 25, 1979	Siding Spring	E. F. Helin, S. J. Bus	·	2.0 km	MPC; JPL
10679 Chankaochang	1979 MH_{6}	Chankaochang	June 25, 1979	Siding Spring	E. F. Helin, S. J. Bus	EOS	7.0 km	MPC; JPL
10680 Ermakov	1979 ME_{8}	Ermakov	June 25, 1979	Siding Spring	E. F. Helin, S. J. Bus	·	2.7 km	MPC; JPL
10681 Khture	1979 TH_{2}	Khture	October 14, 1979	Nauchnij	N. S. Chernykh	THM	13 km	MPC; JPL
10682 Kutryk	1980 KK	Kutryk	May 22, 1980	La Silla	H. Debehogne	·	2.8 km	MPC; JPL
10683 Carter	1980 LY	Carter	June 10, 1980	Palomar	C. S. Shoemaker, E. M. Shoemaker	·	3.4 km	MPC; JPL
10684 Babkina	1980 RV_{2}	Babkina	September 8, 1980	Nauchnij	L. V. Zhuravleva	slow	2.9 km	MPC; JPL
10685 Kharkivuniver	1980 VO	Kharkivuniver	November 9, 1980	Anderson Mesa	E. Bowell	·	5.5 km	MPC; JPL
10686 Kaluna	1980 VX_{2}	Kaluna	November 1, 1980	Palomar	S. J. Bus	·	7.5 km	MPC; JPL
10687	1980 XX	—	December 7, 1980	Nanking	Purple Mountain	·	1.8 km	MPC; JPL
10688 Haghighipour	1981 DK	Haghighipour	February 28, 1981	Siding Spring	S. J. Bus	·	17 km	MPC; JPL
10689 Pinillaalonso	1981 DZ_{1}	Pinillaalonso	February 28, 1981	Siding Spring	S. J. Bus	·	13 km	MPC; JPL
10690 Massera	1981 DO_{3}	Massera	February 28, 1981	Siding Spring	S. J. Bus	·	9.2 km	MPC; JPL
10691 Sans	1981 EJ_{19}	Sans	March 2, 1981	Siding Spring	S. J. Bus	THM	9.3 km	MPC; JPL
10692 Opeil	1981 EK_{19}	Opeil	March 2, 1981	Siding Spring	S. J. Bus	·	3.1 km	MPC; JPL
10693 Zangari	1981 ES_{20}	Zangari	March 2, 1981	Siding Spring	S. J. Bus	·	5.0 km	MPC; JPL
10694 Lacerda	1981 EH_{21}	Lacerda	March 2, 1981	Siding Spring	S. J. Bus	·	12 km	MPC; JPL
10695 Yasunorifujiwara	1981 ER_{21}	Yasunorifujiwara	March 2, 1981	Siding Spring	S. J. Bus	HYG	9.6 km	MPC; JPL
10696 Giuliattiwinter	1981 EO_{24}	Giuliattiwinter	March 2, 1981	Siding Spring	S. J. Bus	·	4.2 km	MPC; JPL
10697 Othonwinter	1981 EO_{40}	Othonwinter	March 2, 1981	Siding Spring	S. J. Bus	·	5.4 km	MPC; JPL
10698 Singer	1981 EJ_{43}	Singer	March 3, 1981	Siding Spring	S. J. Bus	·	2.2 km	MPC; JPL
10699 Calabrese	1981 ES_{43}	Calabrese	March 6, 1981	Siding Spring	S. J. Bus	·	10 km	MPC; JPL
10700 Juanangelviera	1981 ET_{47}	Juanangelviera	March 2, 1981	Siding Spring	S. J. Bus	·	3.3 km	MPC; JPL

== 10701–10800 ==
back to top

Designation			Discovery			Properties		Ref
Permanent	Provisional	Named after	Date	Site	Discoverer(s)	Category	Diam.	Ref
10701 Marilynsimons	1981 PF	Marilynsimons	August 8, 1981	Harvard Observatory	Harvard Observatory	·	5.6 km	MPC; JPL
10702 Arizorcas	1981 QD	Arizorcas	August 30, 1981	Flagstaff	E. Bowell	·	3.3 km	MPC; JPL
10703 Saint-Jacques	1981 QU_{3}	Saint-Jacques	August 23, 1981	La Silla	H. Debehogne	·	3.7 km	MPC; JPL
10704 Sidey	1981 RQ_{1}	Sidey	September 1, 1981	La Silla	H. Debehogne	KOR	7.1 km	MPC; JPL
10705	1981 SL	—	September 22, 1981	Kleť	A. Mrkos	·	2.9 km	MPC; JPL
10706	1981 SE_{2}	—	September 26, 1981	Anderson Mesa	N. G. Thomas	NYS	2.9 km	MPC; JPL
10707 Prunariu	1981 UV_{23}	Prunariu	October 24, 1981	Palomar	S. J. Bus	·	6.0 km	MPC; JPL
10708 Richardspalding	1981 UE_{26}	Richardspalding	October 25, 1981	Palomar	S. J. Bus	KOR	7.9 km	MPC; JPL
10709 Ottofranz	1982 BE_{1}	Ottofranz	January 24, 1982	Anderson Mesa	E. Bowell	(5)	4.5 km	MPC; JPL
10710	1982 JE_{1}	—	May 15, 1982	Palomar	Palomar	·	3.6 km	MPC; JPL
10711 Pskov	1982 TT_{2}	Pskov	October 15, 1982	Nauchnij	L. V. Zhuravleva	·	13 km	MPC; JPL
10712 Malashchuk	1982 UE_{6}	Malashchuk	October 20, 1982	Nauchnij	L. G. Karachkina	NYS	3.4 km	MPC; JPL
10713 Limorenko	1982 UZ_{9}	Limorenko	October 22, 1982	Nauchnij	L. G. Karachkina	·	9.7 km	MPC; JPL
10714	1983 QG	—	August 31, 1983	IRAS	IRAS	·	11 km	MPC; JPL
10715 Nagler	1983 RL_{4}	Nagler	September 11, 1983	Anderson Mesa	B. A. Skiff	·	5.2 km	MPC; JPL
10716 Olivermorton	1983 WQ	Olivermorton	November 29, 1983	Anderson Mesa	E. Bowell	·	15 km	MPC; JPL
10717 Dickwalker	1983 XC	Dickwalker	December 1, 1983	Anderson Mesa	E. Bowell	·	3.3 km	MPC; JPL
10718 Samusʹ	1985 QM_{5}	Samusʹ	August 23, 1985	Nauchnij	N. S. Chernykh	·	4.9 km	MPC; JPL
10719 Andamar	1985 TW	Andamar	October 15, 1985	Anderson Mesa	E. Bowell	MAS	4.4 km	MPC; JPL
10720 Danzl	1986 GY	Danzl	April 5, 1986	Kitt Peak	Spacewatch	·	4.2 km	MPC; JPL
10721 Tuterov	1986 QO_{4}	Tuterov	August 17, 1986	Nauchnij	L. G. Karachkina	·	4.8 km	MPC; JPL
10722 Monari	1986 TB	Monari	October 1, 1986	Bologna	San Vittore	PHO	4.0 km	MPC; JPL
10723 Tobiashinse	1986 TH	Tobiashinse	October 3, 1986	Brorfelde	P. Jensen	·	2.7 km	MPC; JPL
10724 Carolraymond	1986 VR_{5}	Carolraymond	November 5, 1986	Anderson Mesa	E. Bowell	·	4.1 km	MPC; JPL
10725 Sukunabikona	1986 WB	Sukunabikona	November 22, 1986	Toyota	K. Suzuki, T. Urata	·	3.1 km	MPC; JPL
10726 Elodie	1987 BS_{2}	Elodie	January 28, 1987	La Silla	E. W. Elst	NYS	3.3 km	MPC; JPL
10727 Akitsushima	1987 DN	Akitsushima	February 25, 1987	Ojima	T. Niijima, T. Urata	·	10 km	MPC; JPL
10728 Vladimirfock	1987 RT_{5}	Vladimirfock	September 4, 1987	Nauchnij	L. V. Zhuravleva	·	3.2 km	MPC; JPL
10729 Tsvetkova	1987 RU_{5}	Tsvetkova	September 4, 1987	Nauchnij	L. V. Zhuravleva	·	4.3 km	MPC; JPL
10730 White	1987 SU	White	September 19, 1987	Anderson Mesa	E. Bowell	·	4.3 km	MPC; JPL
10731 Dollyparton	1988 BL_{3}	Dollyparton	January 16, 1988	La Silla	H. Debehogne	·	5.0 km	MPC; JPL
10732	1988 BM_{3}	—	January 17, 1988	La Silla	H. Debehogne	·	4.2 km	MPC; JPL
10733 Georgesand	1988 CP_{1}	Georgesand	February 11, 1988	La Silla	E. W. Elst	KOR	6.3 km	MPC; JPL
10734 Wieck	1988 CT_{4}	Wieck	February 13, 1988	La Silla	E. W. Elst	EOS	9.4 km	MPC; JPL
10735 Seine	1988 CF_{6}	Seine	February 15, 1988	La Silla	E. W. Elst	·	3.1 km	MPC; JPL
10736 Marybrück	1988 DD_{3}	Marybrück	February 22, 1988	Siding Spring	R. H. McNaught	EOS · slow	4.9 km	MPC; JPL
10737 Brück	1988 DZ_{4}	Brück	February 25, 1988	Siding Spring	R. H. McNaught	H	1.9 km	MPC; JPL
10738 Marcoaldo	1988 FW_{2}	Marcoaldo	March 17, 1988	La Silla	W. Ferreri	V	3.3 km	MPC; JPL
10739 Lowman	1988 JB_{1}	Lowman	May 12, 1988	Palomar	C. S. Shoemaker, E. M. Shoemaker	T_{j} (2.99)	7.1 km	MPC; JPL
10740 Fallersleben	1988 RX_{2}	Fallersleben	September 8, 1988	Tautenburg Observatory	F. Börngen	·	6.3 km	MPC; JPL
10741 Valeriocarruba	1988 SF_{3}	Valeriocarruba	September 16, 1988	Cerro Tololo	S. J. Bus	MAR	5.7 km	MPC; JPL
10742	1988 VK_{2}	—	November 7, 1988	Okutama	Hioki, T., N. Kawasato	·	4.6 km	MPC; JPL
10743	1988 VS_{2}	—	November 12, 1988	Palomar	E. F. Helin	EUN	7.4 km	MPC; JPL
10744 Tsuruta	1988 XO	Tsuruta	December 5, 1988	Chiyoda	T. Kojima	MAR	6.2 km	MPC; JPL
10745 Arnstadt	1989 AK_{6}	Arnstadt	January 11, 1989	Tautenburg Observatory	F. Börngen	·	10 km	MPC; JPL
10746 Mühlhausen	1989 CE_{6}	Mühlhausen	February 10, 1989	Tautenburg Observatory	F. Börngen	EUN	5.3 km	MPC; JPL
10747 Köthen	1989 CW_{7}	Köthen	February 1, 1989	Tautenburg Observatory	F. Börngen	·	2.7 km	MPC; JPL
10748	1989 CE_{8}	—	February 8, 1989	La Silla	H. Debehogne	·	14 km	MPC; JPL
10749 Musäus	1989 GH_{8}	Musäus	April 6, 1989	Tautenburg Observatory	F. Börngen	NYS	3.9 km	MPC; JPL
10750	1989 PT	—	August 9, 1989	Palomar	E. F. Helin	fast?	2.9 km	MPC; JPL
10751	1989 UV_{1}	—	October 29, 1989	Gekko	Y. Oshima	·	11 km	MPC; JPL
10752	1989 WJ_{1}	—	November 25, 1989	Kushiro	S. Ueda, H. Kaneda	·	3.4 km	MPC; JPL
10753 van de Velde	1989 WU_{4}	van de Velde	November 28, 1989	Tautenburg Observatory	F. Börngen	·	8.8 km	MPC; JPL
10754	1990 QV_{5}	—	August 29, 1990	Palomar	H. E. Holt	·	3.9 km	MPC; JPL
10755	1990 RO_{6}	—	September 10, 1990	La Silla	H. Debehogne	KOR	5.9 km	MPC; JPL
10756	1990 SJ_{2}	—	September 17, 1990	Palomar	H. E. Holt	·	3.9 km	MPC; JPL
10757	1990 SF_{3}	—	September 18, 1990	Palomar	H. E. Holt	·	4.5 km	MPC; JPL
10758 Aldoushuxley	1990 SM_{7}	Aldoushuxley	September 22, 1990	La Silla	E. W. Elst	·	2.8 km	MPC; JPL
10759	1990 SX_{16}	—	September 17, 1990	Palomar	H. E. Holt	EOS	8.6 km	MPC; JPL
10760 Ozeki	1990 TJ_{3}	Ozeki	October 15, 1990	Kitami	K. Endate, K. Watanabe	(254)	4.1 km	MPC; JPL
10761 Lyubimets	1990 TB_{4}	Lyubimets	October 12, 1990	Tautenburg Observatory	L. D. Schmadel, F. Börngen	·	4.3 km	MPC; JPL
10762 von Laue	1990 TC_{4}	von Laue	October 12, 1990	Tautenburg Observatory	F. Börngen, L. D. Schmadel	·	6.7 km	MPC; JPL
10763 Hlawka	1990 TH_{13}	Hlawka	October 12, 1990	Tautenburg Observatory	L. D. Schmadel, F. Börngen	EOS	9.2 km	MPC; JPL
10764 Rübezahl	1990 TK_{13}	Rübezahl	October 12, 1990	Tautenburg Observatory	F. Börngen, L. D. Schmadel	EOS	7.5 km	MPC; JPL
10765	1990 UZ	—	October 20, 1990	Dynic	A. Sugie	EOS	14 km	MPC; JPL
10766	1990 UB_{1}	—	October 20, 1990	Dynic	A. Sugie	·	21 km	MPC; JPL
10767 Toyomasu	1990 UF_{1}	Toyomasu	October 22, 1990	Kitami	K. Endate, K. Watanabe	·	3.3 km	MPC; JPL
10768 Sarutahiko	1990 UZ_{1}	Sarutahiko	October 21, 1990	Oohira	T. Urata	·	2.4 km	MPC; JPL
10769 Minas Gerais	1990 UJ_{5}	Minas Gerais	October 16, 1990	La Silla	E. W. Elst	EOS	10 km	MPC; JPL
10770 Belo Horizonte	1990 VU_{5}	Belo Horizonte	November 15, 1990	La Silla	E. W. Elst	EOS	7.7 km	MPC; JPL
10771 Ouro Prêto	1990 VK_{6}	Ouro Prêto	November 15, 1990	La Silla	E. W. Elst	·	8.4 km	MPC; JPL
10772	1990 YM	—	December 23, 1990	Kushiro	S. Ueda, H. Kaneda	PHO	6.4 km	MPC; JPL
10773 Jamespaton	1991 AK_{2}	Jamespaton	January 7, 1991	Siding Spring	R. H. McNaught	(3025)	10 km	MPC; JPL
10774 Eisenach	1991 AS_{2}	Eisenach	January 15, 1991	Tautenburg Observatory	F. Börngen	·	3.0 km	MPC; JPL
10775 Leipzig	1991 AV_{2}	Leipzig	January 15, 1991	Tautenburg Observatory	F. Börngen	NYS	3.2 km	MPC; JPL
10776 Musashitomiyo	1991 CP_{1}	Musashitomiyo	February 12, 1991	Yorii	M. Arai, H. Mori	·	3.4 km	MPC; JPL
10777	1991 EB_{5}	—	March 13, 1991	La Silla	H. Debehogne	V	3.3 km	MPC; JPL
10778 Marcks	1991 GN_{10}	Marcks	April 9, 1991	Tautenburg Observatory	F. Börngen	·	3.4 km	MPC; JPL
10779	1991 LW	—	June 14, 1991	Palomar	E. F. Helin	·	12 km	MPC; JPL
10780 Apollinaire	1991 PB_{2}	Apollinaire	August 2, 1991	La Silla	E. W. Elst	·	4.6 km	MPC; JPL
10781 Ritter	1991 PV_{31}	Ritter	August 6, 1991	Tautenburg Observatory	F. Börngen	(5)	8.6 km	MPC; JPL
10782 Hittmair	1991 RH_{4}	Hittmair	September 12, 1991	Tautenburg Observatory	L. D. Schmadel, F. Börngen	·	2.8 km	MPC; JPL
10783	1991 RB_{9}	—	September 11, 1991	Palomar	H. E. Holt	KOR	5.8 km	MPC; JPL
10784 Noailles	1991 RQ_{11}	Noailles	September 4, 1991	La Silla	E. W. Elst	MAR	6.1 km	MPC; JPL
10785 Dejaiffe	1991 RD_{12}	Dejaiffe	September 4, 1991	La Silla	E. W. Elst	·	4.4 km	MPC; JPL
10786 Robertmayer	1991 TC_{3}	Robertmayer	October 7, 1991	Tautenburg Observatory	F. Börngen, L. D. Schmadel	·	2.1 km	MPC; JPL
10787 Ottoburkard	1991 TL_{3}	Ottoburkard	October 4, 1991	Tautenburg Observatory	L. D. Schmadel, F. Börngen	·	6.9 km	MPC; JPL
10788	1991 UC	—	October 18, 1991	Kushiro	S. Ueda, H. Kaneda	·	5.7 km	MPC; JPL
10789 Mikeread	1991 VL_{10}	Mikeread	November 5, 1991	Kitt Peak	Spacewatch	KOR	3.5 km	MPC; JPL
10790	1991 XS	—	December 5, 1991	Kushiro	S. Ueda, H. Kaneda	·	10 km	MPC; JPL
10791 Uson	1992 CS	Uson	February 8, 1992	Geisei	T. Seki	·	17 km	MPC; JPL
10792 Ecuador	1992 CQ_{2}	Ecuador	February 2, 1992	La Silla	E. W. Elst	EOS	10 km	MPC; JPL
10793 Quito	1992 CU_{2}	Quito	February 2, 1992	La Silla	E. W. Elst	VER	16 km	MPC; JPL
10794 Vänge	1992 DW_{5}	Vänge	February 29, 1992	La Silla	UESAC	·	11 km	MPC; JPL
10795 Babben	1992 EB_{5}	Babben	March 1, 1992	La Silla	UESAC	·	17 km	MPC; JPL
10796 Sollerman	1992 EB_{8}	Sollerman	March 2, 1992	La Silla	UESAC	·	2.8 km	MPC; JPL
10797 Guatemala	1992 GO_{4}	Guatemala	April 4, 1992	La Silla	E. W. Elst	·	3.1 km	MPC; JPL
10798	1992 LK	—	June 3, 1992	Palomar	G. J. Leonard	·	3.9 km	MPC; JPL
10799 Yucatán	1992 OY_{2}	Yucatán	July 26, 1992	La Silla	E. W. Elst	·	8.7 km	MPC; JPL
10800	1992 OM_{8}	—	July 22, 1992	La Silla	H. Debehogne, Á. López-G.	·	3.3 km	MPC; JPL

== 10801–10900 ==
back to top

Designation			Discovery			Properties		Ref
Permanent	Provisional	Named after	Date	Site	Discoverer(s)	Category	Diam.	Ref
10801 Lüneburg	1992 SK_{26}	Lüneburg	September 23, 1992	Tautenburg Observatory	F. Börngen	·	3.5 km	MPC; JPL
10802 Masamifuruya	1992 UL_{6}	Masamifuruya	October 28, 1992	Kitami	K. Endate, K. Watanabe	·	4.8 km	MPC; JPL
10803 Caléyo	1992 UK_{9}	Caléyo	October 21, 1992	Geisei	T. Seki	·	7.2 km	MPC; JPL
10804 Amenouzume	1992 WN_{3}	Amenouzume	November 23, 1992	Oohira	T. Urata	·	9.4 km	MPC; JPL
10805 Iwano	1992 WG_{5}	Iwano	November 18, 1992	Kitami	K. Endate, K. Watanabe	EUN	6.3 km	MPC; JPL
10806 Mexico	1993 FA_{2}	Mexico	March 23, 1993	Caussols	E. W. Elst	HYG	11 km	MPC; JPL
10807 Uggarde	1993 FT_{4}	Uggarde	March 17, 1993	La Silla	UESAC	THM	13 km	MPC; JPL
10808 Digerrojr	1993 FT_{5}	Digerrojr	March 17, 1993	La Silla	UESAC	EOS	8.6 km	MPC; JPL
10809 Majsterrojr	1993 FS_{14}	Majsterrojr	March 17, 1993	La Silla	UESAC	HYG	13 km	MPC; JPL
10810 Lejsturojr	1993 FL_{15}	Lejsturojr	March 17, 1993	La Silla	UESAC	·	12 km	MPC; JPL
10811 Lau	1993 FM_{19}	Lau	March 17, 1993	La Silla	UESAC	·	7.7 km	MPC; JPL
10812 Grötlingbo	1993 FZ_{25}	Grötlingbo	March 21, 1993	La Silla	UESAC	·	9.9 km	MPC; JPL
10813 Mästerby	1993 FE_{31}	Mästerby	March 19, 1993	La Silla	UESAC	·	14 km	MPC; JPL
10814 Gnisvärd	1993 FW_{31}	Gnisvärd	March 19, 1993	La Silla	UESAC	·	9.8 km	MPC; JPL
10815 Östergarn	1993 FU_{32}	Östergarn	March 19, 1993	La Silla	UESAC	·	7.3 km	MPC; JPL
10816	1993 FZ_{35}	—	March 19, 1993	La Silla	UESAC	THM	11 km	MPC; JPL
10817	1993 FR_{44}	—	March 21, 1993	La Silla	UESAC	HYG	16 km	MPC; JPL
10818	1993 FK_{81}	—	March 18, 1993	La Silla	UESAC	EOS · slow	7.8 km	MPC; JPL
10819 Mahakala	1993 HG	Mahakala	April 19, 1993	USNO Flagstaff	DeYoung, J.	THM	8.7 km	MPC; JPL
10820 Offenbach	1993 QN_{4}	Offenbach	August 18, 1993	Caussols	E. W. Elst	·	5.3 km	MPC; JPL
10821 Kimuratakeshi	1993 SZ	Kimuratakeshi	September 16, 1993	Kitami	K. Endate, K. Watanabe	·	3.8 km	MPC; JPL
10822 Yasunori	1993 SK_{1}	Yasunori	September 16, 1993	Kitami	K. Endate, K. Watanabe	·	2.9 km	MPC; JPL
10823 Sakaguchi	1993 SM_{1}	Sakaguchi	September 16, 1993	Kitami	K. Endate, K. Watanabe	·	3.2 km	MPC; JPL
10824	1993 SW_{3}	—	September 24, 1993	Siding Spring	G. J. Garradd	·	4.6 km	MPC; JPL
10825 Augusthermann	1993 SF_{4}	Augusthermann	September 18, 1993	Tautenburg Observatory	F. Börngen	·	3.2 km	MPC; JPL
10826	1993 SK_{16}	—	September 19, 1993	Palomar	H. E. Holt	·	7.2 km	MPC; JPL
10827 Doikazunori	1993 TC_{3}	Doikazunori	October 11, 1993	Kitami	K. Endate, K. Watanabe	·	3.0 km	MPC; JPL
10828 Tomjones	1993 TE_{5}	Tomjones	October 8, 1993	Kitt Peak	Spacewatch	·	3.9 km	MPC; JPL
10829 Matsuobasho	1993 UU	Matsuobasho	October 22, 1993	Geisei	T. Seki	·	4.3 km	MPC; JPL
10830 Desforges	1993 UT_{6}	Desforges	October 20, 1993	La Silla	E. W. Elst	·	9.4 km	MPC; JPL
10831 Takamagahara	1993 VM_{2}	Takamagahara	November 15, 1993	Oohira	T. Urata	·	4.2 km	MPC; JPL
10832 Hazamashigetomi	1993 VN_{2}	Hazamashigetomi	November 15, 1993	Ōizumi	T. Kobayashi	·	2.3 km	MPC; JPL
10833	1993 VJ_{4}	—	November 11, 1993	Kushiro	S. Ueda, H. Kaneda	·	2.7 km	MPC; JPL
10834 Zembsch-Schreve	1993 VU_{5}	Zembsch-Schreve	November 8, 1993	Kitt Peak	Spacewatch	·	4.1 km	MPC; JPL
10835 Fröbel	1993 VB_{8}	Fröbel	November 12, 1993	Tautenburg Observatory	F. Börngen	V	3.0 km	MPC; JPL
10836	1994 CS_{2}	—	February 14, 1994	Ōizumi	T. Kobayashi	·	7.0 km	MPC; JPL
10837 Yuyakekoyake	1994 EJ_{1}	Yuyakekoyake	March 6, 1994	Nyukasa	M. Hirasawa, S. Suzuki	HNS	8.9 km	MPC; JPL
10838 Lebon	1994 EH_{7}	Lebon	March 9, 1994	Caussols	E. W. Elst	EUN	6.4 km	MPC; JPL
10839 Hufeland	1994 GY_{9}	Hufeland	April 3, 1994	Tautenburg Observatory	F. Börngen	·	8.8 km	MPC; JPL
10840	1994 LR	—	June 1, 1994	Kiyosato	A. Sugie	EOS	24 km	MPC; JPL
10841 Ericforbes	1994 PP_{1}	Ericforbes	August 12, 1994	Siding Spring	R. H. McNaught	H	2.9 km	MPC; JPL
10842	1994 UY_{1}	—	October 31, 1994	Kushiro	S. Ueda, H. Kaneda	·	3.6 km	MPC; JPL
10843	1994 YF_{2}	—	December 30, 1994	Kushiro	S. Ueda, H. Kaneda	·	4.5 km	MPC; JPL
10844	1995 AG	—	January 2, 1995	Ōizumi	T. Kobayashi	·	3.0 km	MPC; JPL
10845	1995 AA_{1}	—	January 6, 1995	Ōizumi	T. Kobayashi	·	2.6 km	MPC; JPL
10846	1995 AW_{2}	—	January 2, 1995	Kushiro	S. Ueda, H. Kaneda	BAP	4.4 km	MPC; JPL
10847 Koch	1995 AV_{4}	Koch	January 5, 1995	Tautenburg Observatory	F. Börngen	EOS	7.1 km	MPC; JPL
10848	1995 BD_{1}	—	January 25, 1995	Ōizumi	T. Kobayashi	·	4.1 km	MPC; JPL
10849 Onigiri	1995 BO_{1}	Onigiri	January 25, 1995	Kiyosato	S. Otomo	·	4.3 km	MPC; JPL
10850 Denso	1995 BU_{4}	Denso	January 26, 1995	Kuma Kogen	A. Nakamura	·	1.5 km	MPC; JPL
10851	1995 CE	—	February 1, 1995	Ōizumi	T. Kobayashi	·	4.8 km	MPC; JPL
10852	1995 CK	—	February 1, 1995	Ōizumi	T. Kobayashi	V	2.4 km	MPC; JPL
10853 Aimoto	1995 CW	Aimoto	February 6, 1995	Chiyoda	T. Kojima	V	2.1 km	MPC; JPL
10854	1995 DO_{1}	—	February 22, 1995	Ōizumi	T. Kobayashi	·	3.0 km	MPC; JPL
10855	1995 DR_{1}	—	February 26, 1995	Ōizumi	T. Kobayashi	·	4.7 km	MPC; JPL
10856 Bechstein	1995 EG_{8}	Bechstein	March 4, 1995	Tautenburg Observatory	F. Börngen	·	17 km	MPC; JPL
10857 Blüthner	1995 EZ_{8}	Blüthner	March 5, 1995	Tautenburg Observatory	F. Börngen	NYS	3.7 km	MPC; JPL
10858	1995 FT	—	March 28, 1995	Ōizumi	T. Kobayashi	·	4.0 km	MPC; JPL
10859	1995 GJ_{7}	—	April 1, 1995	Kiyosato	S. Otomo	·	7.8 km	MPC; JPL
10860	1995 LE	—	June 3, 1995	Kitt Peak	Spacewatch	AMO +1km	1.4 km	MPC; JPL
10861 Ciske	1995 MG_{1}	Ciske	June 22, 1995	Kitt Peak	Spacewatch	CLO	8.6 km	MPC; JPL
10862	1995 QE_{2}	—	August 26, 1995	Catalina Station	T. B. Spahr	·	11 km	MPC; JPL
10863 Oye	1995 QJ_{3}	Oye	August 31, 1995	Haleakalā	AMOS	·	4.6 km	MPC; JPL
10864 Yamagatashi	1995 QS_{3}	Yamagatashi	August 31, 1995	Nanyo	T. Okuni	·	21 km	MPC; JPL
10865 Thelmaruby	1995 SO_{33}	Thelmaruby	September 21, 1995	Kitt Peak	Spacewatch	THM	12 km	MPC; JPL
10866 Peru	1996 NB_{4}	Peru	July 14, 1996	La Silla	E. W. Elst	·	6.4 km	MPC; JPL
10867 Lima	1996 NX_{4}	Lima	July 14, 1996	La Silla	E. W. Elst	·	9.2 km	MPC; JPL
10868	1996 RF_{5}	—	September 3, 1996	Nachi-Katsuura	Y. Shimizu, T. Urata	V	2.8 km	MPC; JPL
10869	1996 SJ_{4}	—	September 21, 1996	Xinglong	SCAP	·	3.3 km	MPC; JPL
10870 Gwendolen	1996 SY_{4}	Gwendolen	September 25, 1996	NRC-DAO	G. C. L. Aikman	·	3.5 km	MPC; JPL
10871	1996 TG_{7}	—	October 5, 1996	Nachi-Katsuura	Y. Shimizu, T. Urata	NYS	2.9 km	MPC; JPL
10872 Vaculík	1996 TJ_{9}	Vaculík	October 12, 1996	Kleť	J. Tichá, M. Tichý	·	2.9 km	MPC; JPL
10873	1996 TF_{11}	—	October 11, 1996	Kitami	K. Endate	·	2.7 km	MPC; JPL
10874 Locatelli	1996 TN_{19}	Locatelli	October 4, 1996	Kitt Peak	Spacewatch	·	3.7 km	MPC; JPL
10875 Veracini	1996 TG_{28}	Veracini	October 7, 1996	Kitt Peak	Spacewatch	·	5.6 km	MPC; JPL
10876	1996 UB	—	October 16, 1996	Ōizumi	T. Kobayashi	KOR	6.9 km	MPC; JPL
10877 Jiangnan Tianchi	1996 UR	Jiangnan Tianchi	October 16, 1996	Nachi-Katsuura	Y. Shimizu, T. Urata	·	6.5 km	MPC; JPL
10878 Moriyama	1996 VV	Moriyama	November 3, 1996	Moriyama	Ikari, Y.	·	5.5 km	MPC; JPL
10879	1996 VM_{3}	—	November 6, 1996	Ōizumi	T. Kobayashi	KOR	7.2 km	MPC; JPL
10880 Kaguya	1996 VN_{4}	Kaguya	November 6, 1996	Chichibu	N. Satō	KOR	4.5 km	MPC; JPL
10881	1996 VA_{5}	—	November 4, 1996	Oohira	T. Urata	·	5.4 km	MPC; JPL
10882 Shinonaga	1996 VG_{5}	Shinonaga	November 3, 1996	Kitami	K. Endate, K. Watanabe	·	9.9 km	MPC; JPL
10883	1996 VU_{5}	—	November 14, 1996	Ōizumi	T. Kobayashi	THM	11 km	MPC; JPL
10884 Tsuboimasaki	1996 VD_{9}	Tsuboimasaki	November 7, 1996	Kitami	K. Endate, K. Watanabe	·	5.2 km	MPC; JPL
10885 Horimasato	1996 VE_{9}	Horimasato	November 7, 1996	Kitami	K. Endate, K. Watanabe	EOS	11 km	MPC; JPL
10886 Mitsuroohba	1996 VR_{30}	Mitsuroohba	November 10, 1996	Nanyo	T. Okuni	·	20 km	MPC; JPL
10887	1996 XU_{25}	—	December 12, 1996	Oohira	T. Urata	KOR	5.5 km	MPC; JPL
10888 Yamatano-orochi	1996 XT_{30}	Yamatano-orochi	December 6, 1996	Nachi-Katsuura	Y. Shimizu, T. Urata	·	17 km	MPC; JPL
10889	1997 AO_{1}	—	January 2, 1997	Ōizumi	T. Kobayashi	3:2	33 km	MPC; JPL
10890	1997 AY_{2}	—	January 4, 1997	Ōizumi	T. Kobayashi	·	13 km	MPC; JPL
10891 Fink	1997 QR_{3}	Fink	August 30, 1997	Caussols	ODAS	(2076)	2.4 km	MPC; JPL
10892 Gianna	1997 SX_{2}	Gianna	September 23, 1997	Farra d'Isonzo	Farra d'Isonzo	·	3.1 km	MPC; JPL
10893	1997 SB_{10}	—	September 19, 1997	Xinglong	SCAP	·	4.6 km	MPC; JPL
10894 Nakai	1997 SE_{30}	Nakai	September 30, 1997	Kitt Peak	Spacewatch	·	10 km	MPC; JPL
10895 Aynrand	1997 TC_{18}	Aynrand	October 11, 1997	Rand	G. R. Viscome	·	4.2 km	MPC; JPL
10896	1997 UZ_{14}	—	October 26, 1997	Nachi-Katsuura	Y. Shimizu, T. Urata	·	3.1 km	MPC; JPL
10897	1997 VW_{3}	—	November 7, 1997	Ōizumi	T. Kobayashi	KOR	7.3 km	MPC; JPL
10898	1997 WJ_{2}	—	November 23, 1997	Ōizumi	T. Kobayashi	·	3.2 km	MPC; JPL
10899	1997 WN_{13}	—	November 24, 1997	Gekko	T. Kagawa, T. Urata	NYS	3.5 km	MPC; JPL
10900 Folkner	1997 WF_{21}	Folkner	November 30, 1997	Ōizumi	T. Kobayashi	·	6.9 km	MPC; JPL

== 10901–11000 ==
back to top

Designation			Discovery			Properties		Ref
Permanent	Provisional	Named after	Date	Site	Discoverer(s)	Category	Diam.	Ref
10901	1997 WS_{21}	—	November 30, 1997	Ōizumi	T. Kobayashi	·	2.3 km	MPC; JPL
10902 Hebeishida	1997 WB_{22}	Hebeishida	November 25, 1997	Xinglong	SCAP	·	5.2 km	MPC; JPL
10903	1997 WA_{30}	—	November 24, 1997	Kushiro	S. Ueda, H. Kaneda	·	7.3 km	MPC; JPL
10904	1997 WR_{31}	—	November 29, 1997	Socorro	LINEAR	MAS	2.6 km	MPC; JPL
10905	1997 WB_{38}	—	November 29, 1997	Socorro	LINEAR	slow	3.5 km	MPC; JPL
10906	1997 WO_{44}	—	November 29, 1997	Socorro	LINEAR	·	4.6 km	MPC; JPL
10907 Savalle	1997 XG_{5}	Savalle	December 6, 1997	Caussols	ODAS	·	5.0 km	MPC; JPL
10908 Kallestroetzel	1997 XH_{9}	Kallestroetzel	December 7, 1997	Caussols	ODAS	·	12 km	MPC; JPL
10909	1997 XB_{10}	—	December 5, 1997	Dynic	A. Sugie	PHO	6.1 km	MPC; JPL
10910	1997 YX	—	December 20, 1997	Ōizumi	T. Kobayashi	·	3.4 km	MPC; JPL
10911 Ziqiangbuxi	1997 YC_{1}	Ziqiangbuxi	December 19, 1997	Xinglong	SCAP	·	8.4 km	MPC; JPL
10912	1997 YW_{5}	—	December 25, 1997	Ōizumi	T. Kobayashi	·	8.3 km	MPC; JPL
10913	1997 YE_{14}	—	December 31, 1997	Ōizumi	T. Kobayashi	GEF	7.9 km	MPC; JPL
10914 Tucker	1997 YQ_{14}	Tucker	December 31, 1997	Prescott	P. G. Comba	THM	7.7 km	MPC; JPL
10915	1997 YU_{16}	—	December 29, 1997	Xinglong	SCAP	·	4.2 km	MPC; JPL
10916 Okina-Ouna	1997 YB_{17}	Okina-Ouna	December 31, 1997	Chichibu	N. Satō	KOR	6.1 km	MPC; JPL
10917	1998 AN	—	January 5, 1998	Ōizumi	T. Kobayashi	·	7.1 km	MPC; JPL
10918 Kodaly	1998 AS_{1}	Kodaly	January 1, 1998	Kitt Peak	Spacewatch	THM	7.8 km	MPC; JPL
10919 Pepíkzicha	1998 AQ_{8}	Pepíkzicha	January 10, 1998	Ondřejov	L. Kotková	·	10 km	MPC; JPL
10920	1998 BC_{1}	—	January 19, 1998	Ōizumi	T. Kobayashi	THM	16 km	MPC; JPL
10921 Romanozen	1998 BC_{2}	Romanozen	January 17, 1998	Dossobuono	Madonna di Dossobuono	·	2.4 km	MPC; JPL
10922 Thomaslam	1998 BG_{2}	Thomaslam	January 20, 1998	Socorro	LINEAR	·	4.7 km	MPC; JPL
10923 Gabrielleliu	1998 BM_{12}	Gabrielleliu	January 23, 1998	Socorro	LINEAR	THM	10 km	MPC; JPL
10924 Mariagriffin	1998 BU_{25}	Mariagriffin	January 29, 1998	Cocoa	I. P. Griffin	EOS	7.0 km	MPC; JPL
10925 Ventoux	1998 BK_{30}	Ventoux	January 28, 1998	Bédoin	P. Antonini	·	5.2 km	MPC; JPL
10926 Hayeri	1998 BF_{41}	Hayeri	January 25, 1998	Haleakalā	NEAT	·	10 km	MPC; JPL
10927 Vaucluse	1998 BB_{42}	Vaucluse	January 29, 1998	Blauvac	R. Roy	·	7.9 km	MPC; JPL
10928 Caprara	1998 BW_{43}	Caprara	January 25, 1998	Cima Ekar	M. Tombelli, G. Forti	DOR	13 km	MPC; JPL
10929 Chenfangyun	1998 CF_{1}	Chenfangyun	February 1, 1998	Xinglong	SCAP	THM	13 km	MPC; JPL
10930 Jinyong	1998 CR_{2}	Jinyong	February 6, 1998	Xinglong	SCAP	EOS · slow	8.5 km	MPC; JPL
10931 Ceccano	1998 DA	Ceccano	February 16, 1998	Ceccano	G. Masi	·	12 km	MPC; JPL
10932 Rebentrost	1998 DL_{1}	Rebentrost	February 18, 1998	Drebach	G. Lehmann	PHO	7.5 km	MPC; JPL
10933	1998 DC_{24}	—	February 17, 1998	Nachi-Katsuura	Y. Shimizu, T. Urata	·	9.4 km	MPC; JPL
10934 Pauldelvaux	1998 DN_{34}	Pauldelvaux	February 27, 1998	La Silla	E. W. Elst	·	17 km	MPC; JPL
10935	1998 EC	—	March 1, 1998	Ōizumi	T. Kobayashi	·	7.0 km	MPC; JPL
10936	1998 FN_{11}	—	March 22, 1998	Nachi-Katsuura	Y. Shimizu, T. Urata	·	11 km	MPC; JPL
10937 Ferris	1998 QW_{54}	Ferris	August 27, 1998	Anderson Mesa	LONEOS	·	10 km	MPC; JPL
10938 Lorenzalevy	1998 SW_{60}	Lorenzalevy	September 17, 1998	Anderson Mesa	LONEOS	·	24 km	MPC; JPL
10939 Maheshwari	1999 CJ_{19}	Maheshwari	February 10, 1999	Socorro	LINEAR	slow	3.7 km	MPC; JPL
10940	1999 CE_{52}	—	February 10, 1999	Socorro	LINEAR	·	5.3 km	MPC; JPL
10941 Mamidala	1999 CD_{79}	Mamidala	February 12, 1999	Socorro	LINEAR	·	7.3 km	MPC; JPL
10942 Natashamaniar	1999 CN_{83}	Natashamaniar	February 10, 1999	Socorro	LINEAR	·	8.3 km	MPC; JPL
10943 Brunier	1999 FY_{6}	Brunier	March 20, 1999	Caussols	ODAS	·	3.2 km	MPC; JPL
10944	1999 FJ_{26}	—	March 19, 1999	Socorro	LINEAR	·	15 km	MPC; JPL
10945	1999 GS_{9}	—	April 14, 1999	Nachi-Katsuura	Y. Shimizu, T. Urata	EOS	9.1 km	MPC; JPL
10946 Guyidong	1999 HR_{2}	Guyidong	April 16, 1999	Xinglong	SCAP	·	16 km	MPC; JPL
10947 Kaiserstuhl	2061 P-L	Kaiserstuhl	September 24, 1960	Palomar	C. J. van Houten, I. van Houten-Groeneveld, T. Gehrels	·	2.8 km	MPC; JPL
10948 Odenwald	2207 P-L	Odenwald	September 24, 1960	Palomar	C. J. van Houten, I. van Houten-Groeneveld, T. Gehrels	V	3.4 km	MPC; JPL
10949 Königstuhl	3066 P-L	Königstuhl	September 25, 1960	Palomar	C. J. van Houten, I. van Houten-Groeneveld, T. Gehrels	·	10 km	MPC; JPL
10950 Albertjansen	4049 P-L	Albertjansen	September 24, 1960	Palomar	C. J. van Houten, I. van Houten-Groeneveld, T. Gehrels	·	8.1 km	MPC; JPL
10951 Spessart	4050 P-L	Spessart	September 24, 1960	Palomar	C. J. van Houten, I. van Houten-Groeneveld, T. Gehrels	EOS	6.3 km	MPC; JPL
10952 Vogelsberg	4152 P-L	Vogelsberg	September 24, 1960	Palomar	C. J. van Houten, I. van Houten-Groeneveld, T. Gehrels	·	11 km	MPC; JPL
10953 Gerdatschira	4276 P-L	Gerdatschira	September 24, 1960	Palomar	C. J. van Houten, I. van Houten-Groeneveld, T. Gehrels	·	1.9 km	MPC; JPL
10954 Spiegel	4545 P-L	Spiegel	September 24, 1960	Palomar	C. J. van Houten, I. van Houten-Groeneveld, T. Gehrels	·	5.3 km	MPC; JPL
10955 Harig	5011 P-L	Harig	October 22, 1960	Palomar	C. J. van Houten, I. van Houten-Groeneveld, T. Gehrels	WIT	3.3 km	MPC; JPL
10956 Vosges	5023 P-L	Vosges	September 24, 1960	Palomar	C. J. van Houten, I. van Houten-Groeneveld, T. Gehrels	V	1.5 km	MPC; JPL
10957 Alps	6068 P-L	Alps	September 24, 1960	Palomar	C. J. van Houten, I. van Houten-Groeneveld, T. Gehrels	·	4.9 km	MPC; JPL
10958 Mont Blanc	6188 P-L	Mont Blanc	September 24, 1960	Palomar	C. J. van Houten, I. van Houten-Groeneveld, T. Gehrels	·	4.5 km	MPC; JPL
10959 Appennino	6579 P-L	Appennino	September 24, 1960	Palomar	C. J. van Houten, I. van Houten-Groeneveld, T. Gehrels	·	7.4 km	MPC; JPL
10960 Gran Sasso	6580 P-L	Gran Sasso	September 24, 1960	Palomar	C. J. van Houten, I. van Houten-Groeneveld, T. Gehrels	·	3.8 km	MPC; JPL
10961 Buysballot	6809 P-L	Buysballot	September 24, 1960	Palomar	C. J. van Houten, I. van Houten-Groeneveld, T. Gehrels	·	1.7 km	MPC; JPL
10962 Sonnenborgh	9530 P-L	Sonnenborgh	October 17, 1960	Palomar	C. J. van Houten, I. van Houten-Groeneveld, T. Gehrels	·	4.4 km	MPC; JPL
10963 van der Brugge	2088 T-1	van der Brugge	March 25, 1971	Palomar	C. J. van Houten, I. van Houten-Groeneveld, T. Gehrels	EOS	5.2 km	MPC; JPL
10964 Degraaff	3216 T-1	Degraaff	March 26, 1971	Palomar	C. J. van Houten, I. van Houten-Groeneveld, T. Gehrels	·	6.4 km	MPC; JPL
10965 van Leverink	3297 T-1	van Leverink	March 26, 1971	Palomar	C. J. van Houten, I. van Houten-Groeneveld, T. Gehrels	THM	9.5 km	MPC; JPL
10966 van der Hucht	3308 T-1	van der Hucht	March 26, 1971	Palomar	C. J. van Houten, I. van Houten-Groeneveld, T. Gehrels	THM	7.5 km	MPC; JPL
10967 Billallen	4349 T-1	Billallen	March 26, 1971	Palomar	C. J. van Houten, I. van Houten-Groeneveld, T. Gehrels	·	7.8 km	MPC; JPL
10968 Sterken	4393 T-1	Sterken	March 26, 1971	Palomar	C. J. van Houten, I. van Houten-Groeneveld, T. Gehrels	THM	7.1 km	MPC; JPL
10969 Perryman	4827 T-1	Perryman	May 13, 1971	Palomar	C. J. van Houten, I. van Houten-Groeneveld, T. Gehrels	slow	10 km	MPC; JPL
10970 de Zeeuw	1079 T-2	de Zeeuw	September 29, 1973	Palomar	C. J. van Houten, I. van Houten-Groeneveld, T. Gehrels	·	8.1 km	MPC; JPL
10971 van Dishoeck	1179 T-2	van Dishoeck	September 29, 1973	Palomar	C. J. van Houten, I. van Houten-Groeneveld, T. Gehrels	NYS	2.5 km	MPC; JPL
10972 Merbold	1188 T-2	Merbold	September 29, 1973	Palomar	C. J. van Houten, I. van Houten-Groeneveld, T. Gehrels	·	5.3 km	MPC; JPL
10973 Thomasreiter	1210 T-2	Thomasreiter	September 29, 1973	Palomar	C. J. van Houten, I. van Houten-Groeneveld, T. Gehrels	·	3.4 km	MPC; JPL
10974 Carolalbert	2225 T-2	Carolalbert	September 29, 1973	Palomar	C. J. van Houten, I. van Houten-Groeneveld, T. Gehrels	·	3.2 km	MPC; JPL
10975 Schelderode	2246 T-2	Schelderode	September 29, 1973	Palomar	C. J. van Houten, I. van Houten-Groeneveld, T. Gehrels	·	3.5 km	MPC; JPL
10976 Wubbena	2287 T-2	Wubbena	September 29, 1973	Palomar	C. J. van Houten, I. van Houten-Groeneveld, T. Gehrels	·	7.5 km	MPC; JPL
10977 Mathlener	3177 T-2	Mathlener	September 30, 1973	Palomar	C. J. van Houten, I. van Houten-Groeneveld, T. Gehrels	·	2.7 km	MPC; JPL
10978 Bärbchen	4095 T-2	Bärbchen	September 29, 1973	Palomar	C. J. van Houten, I. van Houten-Groeneveld, T. Gehrels	·	7.3 km	MPC; JPL
10979 Fristephenson	4171 T-2	Fristephenson	September 29, 1973	Palomar	C. J. van Houten, I. van Houten-Groeneveld, T. Gehrels	SUL	5.3 km	MPC; JPL
10980 Breimer	4294 T-2	Breimer	September 29, 1973	Palomar	C. J. van Houten, I. van Houten-Groeneveld, T. Gehrels	·	2.6 km	MPC; JPL
10981 Fransaris	1148 T-3	Fransaris	October 17, 1977	Palomar	C. J. van Houten, I. van Houten-Groeneveld, T. Gehrels	DOR	9.8 km	MPC; JPL
10982 Poerink	2672 T-3	Poerink	October 11, 1977	Palomar	C. J. van Houten, I. van Houten-Groeneveld, T. Gehrels	THB	10 km	MPC; JPL
10983 Smolders	3196 T-3	Smolders	October 16, 1977	Palomar	C. J. van Houten, I. van Houten-Groeneveld, T. Gehrels	MAS	3.7 km	MPC; JPL
10984 Gispen	3507 T-3	Gispen	October 16, 1977	Palomar	C. J. van Houten, I. van Houten-Groeneveld, T. Gehrels	·	2.4 km	MPC; JPL
10985 Feast	4017 T-3	Feast	October 16, 1977	Palomar	C. J. van Houten, I. van Houten-Groeneveld, T. Gehrels	·	3.6 km	MPC; JPL
10986 Govert	4313 T-3	Govert	October 16, 1977	Palomar	C. J. van Houten, I. van Houten-Groeneveld, T. Gehrels	·	3.0 km	MPC; JPL
10987	1967 US	—	October 30, 1967	Hamburg-Bergedorf	L. Kohoutek	·	4.7 km	MPC; JPL
10988 Feinstein	1968 OL	Feinstein	July 28, 1968	El Leoncito	Félix Aguilar Observatory	·	3.8 km	MPC; JPL
10989 Dolios	1973 SL_{1}	Dolios	September 19, 1973	Palomar	C. J. van Houten, I. van Houten-Groeneveld, T. Gehrels	L4	24 km	MPC; JPL
10990 Okunev	1973 SF_{6}	Okunev	September 28, 1973	Nauchnij	N. S. Chernykh	·	3.7 km	MPC; JPL
10991 Dulov	1974 RY_{1}	Dulov	September 14, 1974	Nauchnij	N. S. Chernykh	·	4.3 km	MPC; JPL
10992 Veryuslaviya	1974 SF	Veryuslaviya	September 19, 1974	Nauchnij	L. I. Chernykh	ERI	5.6 km	MPC; JPL
10993	1975 XF	—	December 1, 1975	Cerro El Roble	C. Torres, Barros, S.	·	2.5 km	MPC; JPL
10994 Fouchard	1978 EU_{9}	Fouchard	March 15, 1978	Palomar	S. J. Bus	KOR	7.7 km	MPC; JPL
10995	1978 NS	—	July 10, 1978	Palomar	E. F. Helin, E. M. Shoemaker	·	6.9 km	MPC; JPL
10996 Armandspitz	1978 NX_{7}	Armandspitz	July 7, 1978	Palomar	S. J. Bus	·	7.9 km	MPC; JPL
10997 Gahm	1978 RX_{7}	Gahm	September 2, 1978	La Silla	C.-I. Lagerkvist	·	4.6 km	MPC; JPL
10998	1978 UN_{4}	—	October 27, 1978	Palomar	C. M. Olmstead	·	14 km	MPC; JPL
10999 Braga-Ribas	1978 VC_{6}	Braga-Ribas	November 7, 1978	Palomar	E. F. Helin, S. J. Bus	slow	7.9 km	MPC; JPL
11000	1978 VE_{6}	—	November 6, 1978	Palomar	E. F. Helin, S. J. Bus	MAS	2.4 km	MPC; JPL

back to top

== See also ==
- Meanings of minor-planet names: 10001–11000
