= List of named minor planets: 5000–5999 =

This is a partial list of named minor planets in numerical order. It contains a total of 910 entries as of 13 April 2026. Minor planets for which no article exist are displayed in grey color and redirect to the list of minor planets (see List of minor planets § Main index).

== From 5,000 to 5,999 ==
- 5000 IAU
- 5001 EMP
- 5002 Marnix
- 5003 Silvanominuto
- 5004 Bruch
- 5005 Kegler
- 5006 Teller
- 5007 Keay
- 5008 Miyazawakenji
- 5009 Sethos
- 5010 Amenemhêt
- 5011 Ptah
- 5012 Eurymedon
- 5013 Suzhousanzhong
- 5014 Gorchakov
- 5015 Litke
- 5016 Migirenko
- 5017 Tenchi
- 5018 Tenmu
- 5019 Erfjord
- 5020 Asimov
- 5021 Krylania
- 5022 Roccapalumba
- 5023 Agapenor
- 5024 Bechmann
- 5025 Mecisteus
- 5026 Martes
- 5027 Androgeos
- 5028 Halaesus
- 5029 Ireland
- 5030 Gyldenkerne
- 5031 Švejcar
- 5032 Conradhirsh
- 5033 Mistral
- 5034 Joeharrington
- 5035 Swift
- 5036 Tuttle
- 5037 Habing
- 5038 Overbeek
- 5039 Rosenkavalier
- 5040 Rabinowitz
- 5041 Theotes
- 5042 Colpa
- 5043 Zadornov
- 5044 Shestaka
- 5045 Hoyin
- 5046 Carletonmoore
- 5047 Zanda
- 5048 Moriarty
- 5049 Sherlock
- 5050 Doctorwatson
- 5051 Ralph
- 5052 Nancyruth
- 5053 Chladni
- 5054 Keil
- 5055 Opekushin
- 5056 Rahua
- 5057 Weeks
- 5058 Tarrega
- 5059 Saroma
- 5060 Yoneta
- 5061 McIntosh
- 5062 Glennmiller
- 5063 Monteverdi
- 5064 Tanchozuru
- 5065 Johnstone
- 5066 Garradd
- 5067 Occidental
- 5068 Cragg
- 5069 Tokeidai
- 5070 Arai
- 5071 Schoenmaker
- 5072 Hioki
- 5073 Junttura
- 5074 Goetzoertel
- 5075 Goryachev
- 5076 Lebedev-Kumach
- 5077 Favaloro
- 5078 Solovjev-Sedoj
- 5079 Brubeck
- 5080 Oja
- 5081 Sanguin
- 5082 Nihonsyoki
- 5083 Irinara
- 5084 Gnedin
- 5085 Hippocrene
- 5086 Demin
- 5087 Emelʹyanov
- 5088 Tancredi
- 5089 Nádherná
- 5090 Wyeth
- 5091 Isakovskij
- 5092 Manara
- 5093 Svirelia
- 5094 Seryozha
- 5095 Escalante
- 5096 Luzin
- 5097 Axford
- 5098 Tomsolomon
- 5099 Iainbanks
- 5100 Pasachoff
- 5101 Akhmerov
- 5102 Benfranklin
- 5103 Diviš
- 5104 Skripnichenko
- 5105 Westerhout
- 5106 Mortensen
- 5107 Laurenbacall
- 5108 Lübeck
- 5109 Robertmiller
- 5110 Belgirate
- 5111 Jacliff
- 5112 Kusaji
- 5113 Kohno
- 5114 Yezo
- 5115 Frimout
- 5116 Korsør
- 5117 Mokotoyama
- 5118 Elnapoul
- 5119 Imbrius
- 5120 Bitias
- 5121 Numazawa
- 5122 Mucha
- 5123 Cynus
- 5124 Muraoka
- 5125 Okushiri
- 5126 Achaemenides
- 5127 Bruhns
- 5128 Wakabayashi
- 5129 Groom
- 5130 Ilioneus
- 5132 Maynard
- 5133 Phillipadams
- 5134 Ebilson
- 5135 Nibutani
- 5136 Baggaley
- 5137 Frevert
- 5138 Gyoda
- 5139 Rumoi
- 5140 Kida
- 5141 Tachibana
- 5142 Okutama
- 5143 Heracles
- 5144 Achates
- 5145 Pholus
- 5146 Moiwa
- 5147 Maruyama
- 5148 Giordano
- 5149 Leibniz
- 5150 Fellini
- 5151 Weerstra
- 5152 Labs
- 5153 Gierasch
- 5154 Leonov
- 5155 Denisyuk
- 5156 Golant
- 5157 Hindemith
- 5158 Ogarev
- 5159 Burbine
- 5160 Camoes
- 5161 Wightman
- 5162 Piemonte
- 5163 Vollmayr-Lee
- 5164 Mullo
- 5165 Videnom
- 5166 Olson
- 5167 Joeharms
- 5168 Jenner
- 5169 Duffell
- 5170 Sissons
- 5171 Augustesen
- 5172 Yoshiyuki
- 5173 Stjerneborg
- 5174 Okugi
- 5175 Ables
- 5176 Yoichi
- 5177 Hugowolf
- 5178 Pattazhy
- 5179 Takeshima
- 5180 Ohno
- 5181 SURF
- 5182 Bray
- 5183 Robyn
- 5184 Cavaillé-Coll
- 5185 Alerossi
- 5186 Donalu
- 5187 Domon
- 5188 Paine
- 5190 Fry
- 5191 Paddack
- 5192 Yabuki
- 5193 Tanakawataru
- 5194 Böttger
- 5195 Kaendler
- 5196 Bustelli
- 5197 Rottmann
- 5198 Fongyunwah
- 5199 Dortmund
- 5200 Pamal
- 5201 Ferraz-Mello
- 5202 Charleseliot
- 5203 Pavarotti
- 5204 Herakleitos
- 5205 Servián
- 5206 Kodomonomori
- 5207 Hearnshaw
- 5208 Royer
- 5209 Oloosson
- 5210 Saint-Saëns
- 5211 Stevenson
- 5212 Celiacruz
- 5213 Takahashi
- 5214 Oozora
- 5215 Tsurui
- 5216 Cannizzo
- 5217 Chaozhou
- 5218 Kutsak
- 5219 Zemka
- 5220 Vika
- 5221 Fabribudweis
- 5222 Ioffe
- 5223 McSween
- 5224 Abbe
- 5225 Loral
- 5226 Pollack
- 5227 Bocacara
- 5228 Máca
- 5229 Irurita
- 5230 Asahina
- 5231 Verne
- 5232 Jordaens
- 5233 Nastes
- 5234 Sechenov
- 5235 Jean-Loup
- 5236 Yoko
- 5237 Yoshikawa
- 5238 Naozane
- 5239 Reiki
- 5240 Kwasan
- 5241 Beeson
- 5242 Kenreimonin
- 5243 Clasien
- 5244 Amphilochos
- 5245 Maslyakov
- 5246 Migliorini
- 5247 Krylov
- 5248 Scardia
- 5249 Giza
- 5250 Jas
- 5251 Bradwood
- 5252 Vikrymov
- 5253 Fredclifford
- 5254 Ulysses
- 5255 Johnsophie
- 5256 Farquhar
- 5257 Laogonus
- 5258 Rhoeo
- 5259 Epeigeus
- 5260 Philvéron
- 5261 Eureka
- 5262 Brucegoldberg
- 5263 Arrius
- 5264 Telephus
- 5265 Schadow
- 5266 Rauch
- 5267 Zegmott
- 5268 Černohorský
- 5269 Paustovskij
- 5270 Kakabadze
- 5271 Kaylamaya
- 5272 Dickinson
- 5273 Peilisheng
- 5274 Degewij
- 5275 Zdislava
- 5276 Gulkis
- 5277 Brisbane
- 5278 Polly
- 5279 Arthuradel
- 5280 Andrewbecker
- 5281 Lindstrom
- 5282 Yamatotakeru
- 5283 Pyrrhus
- 5284 Orsilocus
- 5285 Krethon
- 5286 Haruomukai
- 5287 Heishu
- 5288 Nankichi
- 5289 Niemelä
- 5290 Langevin
- 5291 Yuuko
- 5292 Mackwell
- 5293 Bentengahama
- 5294 Onnetoh
- 5295 Masayo
- 5296 Friedrich
- 5297 Schinkel
- 5298 Paraskevopoulos
- 5299 Bittesini
- 5300 Sats
- 5301 Novobranets
- 5302 Romanoserra
- 5303 Parijskij
- 5304 Bazhenov
- 5305 Bernievolz
- 5306 Fangfen
- 5307 Paul-André
- 5308 Hutchison
- 5309 MacPherson
- 5310 Papike
- 5311 Rutherford
- 5312 Schott
- 5313 Nunes
- 5314 Wilkickia
- 5315 Balʹmont
- 5316 Filatov
- 5317 Verolacqua
- 5318 Dientzenhofer
- 5319 Petrovskaya
- 5320 Lisbeth
- 5321 Jagras
- 5322 Ghaffari
- 5323 Fogh
- 5324 Lyapunov
- 5325 Silver
- 5326 Vittoriosacco
- 5327 Gertwilkens
- 5328 Nisiyamakoiti
- 5329 Decaro
- 5330 Senrikyu
- 5331 Erimomisaki
- 5332 Davidaguilar
- 5333 Kanaya
- 5334 Mishima
- 5335 Damocles
- 5336 Kley
- 5337 Aoki
- 5338 Michelblanc
- 5339 Desmars
- 5340 Burton
- 5341 Purgathofer
- 5342 Le Poole
- 5343 Ryzhov
- 5344 Ryabov
- 5345 Boynton
- 5346 Benedetti
- 5347 Orestelesca
- 5348 Kennoguchi
- 5349 Paulharris
- 5350 Epetersen
- 5351 Diderot
- 5352 Fujita
- 5353 Baillié
- 5354 Hisayo
- 5355 Akihiro
- 5356 Neagari
- 5357 Sekiguchi
- 5358 Meineko
- 5359 Markzakharov
- 5360 Rozhdestvenskij
- 5361 Goncharov
- 5362 Johnyoung
- 5363 Kupka
- 5364 Christophschäfer
- 5365 Fievez
- 5366 Rhianjones
- 5367 Sollenberger
- 5368 Vitagliano
- 5369 Virgiugum
- 5370 Taranis
- 5371 Albertoaccomazzi
- 5372 Bikki
- 5373 Michaelkurtz
- 5374 Hokutosei
- 5375 Siedentopf
- 5376 Maruthiakella
- 5377 Komori
- 5378 Ellyett
- 5379 Abehiroshi
- 5380 Sprigg
- 5381 Sekhmet
- 5382 McKay
- 5383 Leavitt
- 5384 Changjiangcun
- 5385 Kamenka
- 5386 Bajaja
- 5387 Casleo
- 5388 Mottola
- 5389 Choikaiyau
- 5390 Huichiming
- 5391 Emmons
- 5392 Parker
- 5393 Goldstein
- 5394 Jurgens
- 5395 Shosasaki
- 5396 Kathleenhowell
- 5397 Vojislava
- 5398 Jennifergannon
- 5399 Awa
- 5400 Anniewalker
- 5401 Minamioda
- 5402 Kejosmith
- 5403 Takachiho
- 5404 Uemura
- 5405 Neverland
- 5406 Jonjoseph
- 5408 Thé
- 5409 Saale
- 5410 Spivakov
- 5411 Liia
- 5412 Rou
- 5413 Smyslov
- 5414 Sokolov
- 5415 Lyanzuridi
- 5416 Estremadoyro
- 5417 Solovaya
- 5418 Joyce
- 5419 Benua
- 5420 Jancis
- 5421 Ulanova
- 5422 Hodgkin
- 5423 Horahořejš
- 5424 Covington
- 5425 Vojtěch
- 5426 Sharp
- 5427 Jensmartin
- 5430 Luu
- 5431 Maxinehelin
- 5432 Imakiire
- 5433 Kairen
- 5434 Tomwhitney
- 5435 Kameoka
- 5436 Eumelos
- 5438 Lorre
- 5439 Couturier
- 5440 Terao
- 5441 Andymurray
- 5442 Drossart
- 5443 Encrenaz
- 5444 Gautier
- 5445 Williwaw
- 5446 Heyler
- 5447 Lallement
- 5448 Siebold
- 5450 Sokrates
- 5451 Plato
- 5453 Zakharchenya
- 5454 Kojiki
- 5455 Surkov
- 5456 Merman
- 5457 Queen's
- 5458 Aizman
- 5459 Saraburger
- 5460 Tsénaatʼaʼí
- 5461 Autumn
- 5463 Danwelcher
- 5464 Weller
- 5465 Chumakov
- 5466 Makibi
- 5468 Hamatonbetsu
- 5470 Kurtlindstrom
- 5471 Tunguska
- 5473 Yamanashi
- 5474 Gingasen
- 5475 Hanskennedy
- 5476 Mulius
- 5477 Holmes
- 5478 Wartburg
- 5479 Grahamryder
- 5481 Kiuchi
- 5482 Korankei
- 5483 Cherkashin
- 5484 Inoda
- 5485 Kaula
- 5488 Kiyosato
- 5489 Oberkochen
- 5490 Burbidge
- 5491 Kaulbach
- 5492 Thoma
- 5493 Spitzweg
- 5494 Johanmohr
- 5495 Rumyantsev
- 5497 Sararussell
- 5498 Gustafsson
- 5500 Twilley
- 5502 Brashear
- 5504 Lanzerotti
- 5505 Rundetaarn
- 5506 Artiglio
- 5507 Niijima
- 5508 Gomyou
- 5509 Rennsteig
- 5511 Cloanthus
- 5513 Yukio
- 5514 Karelraška
- 5515 Naderi
- 5516 Jawilliamson
- 5517 Johnerogers
- 5518 Mariobotta
- 5519 Lellouch
- 5520 Natori
- 5521 Morpurgo
- 5522 De Rop
- 5523 Luminet
- 5524 Lecacheux
- 5526 Kenzo
- 5529 Perry
- 5530 Eisinga
- 5531 Carolientje
- 5532 Ichinohe
- 5533 Bagrov
- 5535 Annefrank
- 5536 Honeycutt
- 5537 Sanya
- 5538 Luichewoo
- 5539 Limporyen
- 5540 Smirnova
- 5541 Seimei
- 5542 Moffatt
- 5543 Sharaf
- 5544 Kazakov
- 5545 Makarov
- 5546 Salavat
- 5547 Acadiau
- 5548 Thosharriot
- 5549 Bobstefanik
- 5551 Glikson
- 5552 Studnička
- 5553 Chodas
- 5554 Keesey
- 5555 Wimberly
- 5557 Chimikeppuko
- 5558 Johnnapier
- 5559 Beategordon
- 5560 Amytis
- 5561 Iguchi
- 5562 Sumi
- 5563 Yuuri
- 5564 Hikari
- 5565 Ukyounodaibu
- 5567 Durisen
- 5568 Mufson
- 5569 Colby
- 5570 Kirsan
- 5571 Lesliegreen
- 5572 Bliskunov
- 5573 Hilarydownes
- 5574 Seagrave
- 5575 Ryanpark
- 5576 Albanese
- 5577 Priestley
- 5578 Takakura
- 5579 Uhlherr
- 5580 Sharidake
- 5581 Mitsuko
- 5583 Braunerová
- 5584 Izenberg
- 5585 Parks
- 5588 Jennabelle
- 5589 De Meis
- 5591 Koyo
- 5592 Oshima
- 5593 Jonsujatha
- 5594 Jimmiller
- 5595 Roth
- 5596 Morbidelli
- 5597 Warren
- 5598 Carlmurray
- 5603 Rausudake
- 5605 Kushida
- 5606 Muramatsu
- 5608 Olmos
- 5609 Stroncone
- 5610 Balster
- 5612 Nevskij
- 5613 Donskoj
- 5614 Yakovlev
- 5615 Iskander
- 5616 Vogtland
- 5617 Emelyanenko
- 5618 Saitama
- 5619 Shair
- 5620 Jasonwheeler
- 5621 Erb
- 5622 Percyjulian
- 5623 Iwamori
- 5624 Shirley
- 5625 Jamesferguson
- 5626 Melissabrucker
- 5627 Short
- 5628 Preussen
- 5629 Kuwana
- 5630 Billschaefer
- 5631 Sekihokutouge
- 5632 Ingelehmann
- 5634 Victorborge
- 5635 Cole
- 5636 Jacobson
- 5637 Gyas
- 5638 Deikoon
- 5639 Ćuk
- 5640 Yoshino
- 5641 McCleese
- 5642 Bobbywilliams
- 5643 Roques
- 5644 Maureenbell
- 5647 Sarojininaidu
- 5648 Axius
- 5649 Donnashirley
- 5650 Mochihito-o
- 5651 Traversa
- 5652 Amphimachus
- 5653 Camarillo
- 5654 Terni
- 5655 Barney
- 5656 Oldfield
- 5657 Groombridge
- 5658 Clausbaader
- 5659 Vergara
- 5661 Hildebrand
- 5662 Wendycalvin
- 5663 McKeegan
- 5664 Eugster
- 5665 Begemann
- 5666 Rabelais
- 5667 Nakhimovskaya
- 5668 Foucault
- 5670 Rosstaylor
- 5671 Chanal
- 5672 Libby
- 5673 McAllister
- 5674 Wolff
- 5675 Evgenilebedev
- 5676 Voltaire
- 5677 Aberdonia
- 5678 DuBridge
- 5679 Akkado
- 5680 Nasmyth
- 5681 Bakulev
- 5682 Beresford
- 5683 Bifukumonin
- 5684 Kogo
- 5685 Sanenobufukui
- 5686 Chiyonoura
- 5687 Yamamotoshinobu
- 5688 Kleewyck
- 5689 Rhön
- 5691 Fredwatson
- 5692 Shirao
- 5694 Berényi
- 5695 Remillieux
- 5696 Ibsen
- 5697 Arrhenius
- 5698 Nolde
- 5699 Munch
- 5700 Homerus
- 5701 Baltuck
- 5702 Morando
- 5703 Hevelius
- 5704 Schumacher
- 5705 Ericsterken
- 5706 Finkelstein
- 5707 Shevchenko
- 5708 Melancholia
- 5709 Tamyeunleung
- 5710 Silentium
- 5711 Eneev
- 5712 Funke
- 5714 Krasinsky
- 5715 Kramer
- 5716 Pickard
- 5717 Damir
- 5718 Roykerr
- 5719 Křižík
- 5720 Halweaver
- 5722 Johnscherrer
- 5723 Hudson
- 5725 Nördlingen
- 5726 Rubin
- 5727 Pierobenvenuti
- 5728 Umbertobenvenuti
- 5730 Yonosuke
- 5731 Zeus
- 5734 Noguchi
- 5735 Loripaul
- 5736 Sanford
- 5737 Itoh
- 5738 Billpickering
- 5739 Robertburns
- 5740 Toutoumi
- 5741 Akanemaruta
- 5743 Kato
- 5744 Yorimasa
- 5747 Williamina
- 5748 Davebrin
- 5749 Urduja
- 5750 Kandatai
- 5751 Zao
- 5753 Yoshidatadahiko
- 5756 Wassenbergh
- 5757 Tichá
- 5758 Brunini
- 5759 Zoshchenko
- 5760 Mittlefehldt
- 5761 Andreivanov
- 5762 Wänke
- 5763 Williamtobin
- 5765 Izett
- 5766 Carmelofalco
- 5767 Moldun
- 5768 Pittich
- 5769 Michard
- 5770 Aricam
- 5771 Somerville
- 5772 Johnlambert
- 5773 Hopper
- 5774 Ratliff
- 5775 Inuyama
- 5777 Hanaki
- 5778 Jurafrance
- 5779 Schupmann
- 5780 Lafontaine
- 5781 Barkhatova
- 5782 Akirafujiwara
- 5783 Kumagaya
- 5784 Yoron
- 5785 Fulton
- 5786 Talos
- 5789 Sellin
- 5790 Nagasaki
- 5791 Comello
- 5792 Unstrut
- 5793 Ringuelet
- 5794 Irmina
- 5795 Roshchina
- 5796 Klemm
- 5797 Bivoj
- 5798 Burnett
- 5799 Brewington
- 5800 Pollock
- 5801 Vasarely
- 5802 Casteldelpiano
- 5803 Ötzi
- 5804 Bambinidipraga
- 5805 Glasgow
- 5806 Archieroy
- 5807 Mshatka
- 5808 Babelʹ
- 5809 Kulibin
- 5811 Keck
- 5812 Jayewinkler
- 5813 Eizaburo
- 5815 Shinsengumi
- 5816 Potsdam
- 5817 Robertfrazer
- 5819 Lauretta
- 5820 Babelsberg
- 5821 Yukiomaeda
- 5822 Masakichi
- 5823 Oryo
- 5824 Inagaki
- 5825 Rakuyou
- 5826 Bradstreet
- 5827 Letunov
- 5829 Ishidagoro
- 5830 Simohiro
- 5831 Dizzy
- 5832 Martaprincipe
- 5833 Peterson
- 5834 Kasai
- 5835 Mainfranken
- 5837 Hedin
- 5838 Hamsun
- 5839 GOI
- 5840 Raybrown
- 5841 Stone
- 5842 Cancelli
- 5844 Chlupáč
- 5845 Davidbrewster
- 5846 Hessen
- 5847 Wakiya
- 5848 Harutoriko
- 5849 Bhanji
- 5850 Masaharu
- 5851 Inagawa
- 5852 Nanette
- 5855 Yukitsuna
- 5856 Peluk
- 5857 Neglinka
- 5858 Borovitskia
- 5859 Ostozhenka
- 5860 Deankoontz
- 5861 Glynjones
- 5862 Sakanoue
- 5863 Tara
- 5864 Montgolfier
- 5865 Qualytemocrina
- 5866 Sachsen
- 5868 Ohta
- 5869 Tanith
- 5870 Baltimore
- 5871 Bobbell
- 5872 Sugano
- 5873 Archilochos
- 5875 Kuga
- 5877 Toshimaihara
- 5878 Charlene
- 5879 Almeria
- 5881 Akashi
- 5883 Josephblack
- 5884 Dolezal
- 5885 Apeldoorn
- 5886 Rutger
- 5887 Yauza
- 5888 Ruders
- 5889 Mickiewicz
- 5890 Carlsberg
- 5891 Gehrig
- 5892 Milesdavis
- 5893 Coltrane
- 5894 Telč
- 5895 Žbirka
- 5896 Narrenschiff
- 5897 Novotná
- 5899 Jedicke
- 5900 Jensen
- 5902 Talima
- 5904 Württemberg
- 5905 Johnson
- 5907 Rhigmus
- 5908 Aichi
- 5909 Nagoya
- 5910 Zátopek
- 5912 Oyatoshiyuki
- 5914 Kathywhaler
- 5915 Yoshihiro
- 5916 van der Woude
- 5917 Chibasai
- 5919 Patrickmartin
- 5920 Davidbell
- 5922 Shouichi
- 5923 Liedeke
- 5924 Teruo
- 5926 Schönfeld
- 5927 Krogh
- 5928 Pindarus
- 5929 Manzano
- 5930 Zhiganov
- 5931 Zhvanetskij
- 5932 Prutkov
- 5933 Kemurdzhian
- 5934 Mats
- 5935 Ostankino
- 5936 Khadzhinov
- 5937 Lodén
- 5938 Keller
- 5939 Toshimayeda
- 5940 Feliksobolev
- 5941 Valencia
- 5942 Denzilrobert
- 5943 Lovi
- 5944 Utesov
- 5945 Roachapproach
- 5946 Hrozný
- 5947 Bonnie
- 5948 Longo
- 5950 Leukippos
- 5951 Alicemonet
- 5952 Davemonet
- 5953 Shelton
- 5954 Epikouros
- 5955 Khromchenko
- 5956 d'Alembert
- 5957 Irina
- 5958 Barrande
- 5959 Shaklan
- 5960 Wakkanai
- 5961 Watt
- 5962 Shikokutenkyo
- 5963 Terryalfriend
- 5964 Johnjunkins
- 5965 Meisel
- 5966 Tomeko
- 5967 Edithlevy
- 5968 Trauger
- 5969 Ryuichiro
- 5970 Ohdohrikouen
- 5971 Tickell
- 5972 Harryatkinson
- 5973 Takimoto
- 5975 Otakemayumi
- 5976 Kalatajean
- 5978 Kaminokuni
- 5981 Kresilas
- 5982 Polykletus
- 5983 Praxiteles
- 5984 Lysippus
- 5986 Xenophon
- 5987 Liviogratton
- 5988 Gorodnitskij
- 5989 Sorin
- 5990 Panticapaeon
- 5991 Ivavladis
- 5992 Nittler
- 5993 Tammydickinson
- 5994 Yakubovich
- 5995 Saint-Aignan
- 5996 Julioángel
- 5997 Dirac
- 5998 Sitenský
- 5999 Plescia
back to top

== See also ==
- List of minor planet discoverers
- List of observatory codes
- Meanings of minor planet names § Index
