= 4263 Abashiri =

Stony flora asteroid from the inner regions of the 1989 RL2 belt

Discovery
- Discovered by: M. Yanai; K. Watanabe
- Discovery site: Kitami Obs.
- Discovery date: 7 September 1989

Designations
- Named after: Abashiri (Japanese city)
- Alternative designations: 1989 RL_{2} · 1935 KE; 1952 OS · 1969 TS_{3} 1972 OB · 1978 EK; 1981 AT_{1} · 1982 PF; 1988 DK_{5}
- Minor planet category: main-belt · Flora

Orbital characteristics
- Epoch 4 September 2017 (JD 2458000.5)
- Uncertainty parameter 0
- Observation arc: 66.06 yr (24,129 days)
- Aphelion: 2.5445 AU
- Perihelion: 1.9251 AU
- Semi-major axis: 2.2348 AU
- Eccentricity: 0.1386
- Orbital period (sidereal): 3.34 yr (1,220 days)
- Mean anomaly: 229.15°
- Mean motion: 0° 17^{m} 42^{s} / day
- Inclination: 5.8057°
- Longitude of ascending node: 298.07°
- Argument of perihelion: 307.66°

Physical characteristics
- Dimensions: 7.17 km (derived); 8.98±0.44 km
- Synodic rotation period: 4.8817±0.0001 h (Note: Pravec (2012): lightcurve plot of (4263) Abashiri with a rotation period 4.8817±0.0001 hours with a brightness amplitude of 0.11 mag, denoted as a secure results (within the precision given and no ambiguity, U=3) by the Collaborative Asteroid Lightcurve Link (CALL). Summary figures for (4263) Abashiri at Collaborative Asteroid Lightcurve Link (CALL)); 4.8820±0.0002 h (Note: Pravec (2008): lightcurve plot of (4263) Abashiri with a rotation period 4.8820±0.0002 hours with a brightness amplitude of 0.15 mag, denoted as a secure results (within the precision given and no ambiguity, U=3) by the Collaborative Asteroid Lightcurve Link (CALL). Summary figures for (4263) Abashiri at Collaborative Asteroid Lightcurve Link (CALL)); 4.88230±0.00008 h (Note: Pravec (2016): lightcurve plot of (4263) Abashiri with a rotation period 4.88230±0.00008 hours with a brightness amplitude of 0.42 mag, denoted as a secure results (within the precision given and no ambiguity, U=3) by the Collaborative Asteroid Lightcurve Link (CALL). Summary figures for (4263) Abashiri at Collaborative Asteroid Lightcurve Link (CALL))
- Geometric albedo: 0.200±0.033; 0.24 (assumed)
- Spectral type: S
- Absolute magnitude (H): 12.7 · 12.60 · 12.44±0.08 (R) · 12.93±0.094

4263 Abashiri, provisional designation 1989 RL_{2}, is a stony Flora asteroid from the inner regions of the asteroid belt, approximately 8 kilometers in diameter.

The asteroid was discovered on 7 September 1989, by Japanese astronomers Masayuki Yanai and Kazuro Watanabe at Kitami Observatory in eastern Hokkaidō, Japan. It was named for the Japanese city of Abashiri.

== Orbit and classification ==
Abashiri is a member of the Flora family, one of the largest groups of stony asteroids in the main-belt. It orbits the Sun in the inner main-belt at a distance of 1.9–2.5 AU once every 3 years and 4 months (1,220 days). Its orbit has an eccentricity of 0.14 and an inclination of 6° with respect to the ecliptic. Due to a precovery obtained at Palomar Observatory in 1951, the asteroid's observation arc could be extended by 38 years prior to its discovery.

== Physical characteristics ==
Abashiri has been characterized as a stony S-type asteroid.

=== Rotation period ===
Between 2008 and 2016, three rotational lightcurves of Abashiri were obtained by Czech astronomer Petr Pravec at Ondřejov Observatory. Lightcurve analysis gave a well-defined rotation period of between 4.8817 and 4.88230 hours with a corresponding brightness variation between 0.11 and 0.42 magnitude (U=3/3).

=== Diameter and albedo ===
According to the survey carried out by NASA's Wide-field Infrared Survey Explorer with its subsequent NEOWISE mission, Abashiri measures 9.0 kilometers in diameter and its surface has an albedo of 0.20, while the Collaborative Asteroid Lightcurve Link assumes an albedo of 0.24, derived from 8 Flora, the Flora family's largest member and namesake, and calculates a somewhat smaller diameter of 7.2 kilometers.

== Naming ==
This minor planet was named for the Japanese city of Abashiri, known for its fishing industry. It is located at the Sea of Okhotsk, about 50 kilometers east of Kitami, in the eastern part of the island of Hokkaidō. The minor planets, 3720 Hokkaido and 3785 Kitami are named after the island and city, respectively. The official naming citation was published by the Minor Planet Center on 21 November 1991 (M.P.C. 19336).
