= 4607 Seilandfarm =

Main belt asteroid

Discovery
- Discovered by: K. Endate; K. Watanabe
- Discovery site: Kitami Obs.
- Discovery date: 25 November 1987

Designations
- Named after: Seilandfarm (Japanese farm)
- Alternative designations: 1987 WR · 1951 CK_{1} 1975 EO_{4}
- Minor planet category: main-belt · (inner)

Orbital characteristics
- Epoch 4 September 2017 (JD 2458000.5)
- Uncertainty parameter 0
- Observation arc: 42.23 yr (15,424 days)
- Aphelion: 2.3083 AU
- Perihelion: 2.2194 AU
- Semi-major axis: 2.2638 AU
- Eccentricity: 0.0196
- Orbital period (sidereal): 3.41 yr (1,244 days)
- Mean anomaly: 225.75°
- Mean motion: 0° 17^{m} 21.84^{s} / day
- Inclination: 2.2522°
- Longitude of ascending node: 250.50°
- Argument of perihelion: 219.80°
- Known satellites: 1 (Note: CBET No. 1716, 2009 March 11 – Central Bureau for Astronomical Telegrams for (4607) Seilandfarm: Photometric observations obtained between 17 January and 25 February 2009, show that 4607 Seilandfarm is a binary system with an orbital period of 31.63±0.02 hours. The primary has a period of 3.9683±0.0001 hours, and it has a lightcurve brightness variation of 0.15 magnitude, indicating a nearly spheroidal shape. Mutual eclipse/occultation events suggest a lower limit on secondary-to-primary mean-diameter ratio of 0.29.Central Bureau for Astronomical Telegrams No. 1716 Reported by: D. Pray, Carbuncle Observatory, W. Brookfield, MA, U.S.A.; P. Kusnirak and P. Pravec, Ondrejov Observatory; J. Gross, W. Cooney, and D. Terrell, Sonoita Research Observatory, Sonoita, AZ; and R. Durkee, Minneapolis, MN.)

Physical characteristics
- Dimensions: 6.33±0.27 km 7.13 km (calculated); 7.389±0.115 km 7.482±0.136
- Synodic rotation period: 3.9681±0.0002 h (Note: Pravec (2009) web: rotation period 3.9683±0.0001 hours with a brightness amplitude of 0.15 mag, as well as Pravec (2014) web: rotation period 3.9681±0.0002 hours with a brightness amplitude of 0.17 mag. Quality Code for both observations: U=3 (denotes a secure result within the precision given and no ambiguity). Summary figures for (4607) Seilandfarm at Collaborative Asteroid Lightcurve Link (CALL)); 3.9683±0.0001 h
- Geometric albedo: 0.178±0.032; 0.20 (assumed); 0.2239±0.0142; 0.279±0.035
- Spectral type: SMASS = L · L
- Absolute magnitude (H): 12.89±0.34 · 12.9 · 13.00 · 13.1 · 13.2

4607 Seilandfarm, provisional designation 1987 WR, is a rare-type binary asteroid from the inner regions of the asteroid belt, approximately 7 kilometers in diameter.

It was discovered on 25 November 1987, by Japanese amateur astronomers Kin Endate and Kazuro Watanabe at Kitami Observatory on the Japanese island of Hokkaidō. It was named for a dairy and cattle farm with the same name, located near the Japanese city of Kitami.

== Classification and orbit ==
Seilandfarm orbits the Sun in the inner main-belt at a distance of 2.2–2.3 AU once every 3 years and 5 months (1,244 days). Its orbit has an eccentricity of 0.02 and an inclination of 2° with respect to the ecliptic.

In February 1951, the asteroid was first identified as 1951 CK_{1} at Abastuman Observatory (119) in Georgia. The body's observation arc begins with its official discovery observation at Kitami.

== Binary system ==
=== Primary ===
On the SMASS taxonomic scheme, Seilandfarm is classified as a rare and reddish L-type asteroid.

According to the survey carried out by NASA's Wide-field Infrared Survey Explorer with its NEOWISE mission, Seilandfarm measures between 6.3 and 7.5 and kilometers in diameter, and its surface has a corresponding albedo between 0.178 and 0.279, while the Collaborative Asteroid Lightcurve Link assumes a standard albedo for stony asteroids of 0.20 and calculates a diameter of 7.1 kilometers, in agreement with the results obtained by the space-based observations.

In February 2009 and September 2014, three rotational lightcurves were obtained from photometric observations by astronomers Donald P. Pray and Petr Pravec at the U.S. Carbuncle and the Czech Ondřejov Observatory, respectively. The lightcurves rendered a well-defined rotation period of 3.9681 and 3.9683 hours with a corresponding brightness variation of 0.15 and 0.17 magnitude, indicating that the asteroid's shape is nearly spheroidal (U=3/3/3).

=== Moon ===
During the photometric observations in February 2009, it was discovered that Seilandfarm is in fact a binary system. Its minor-planet moon has an orbital period of 31.6 hours. Based on mutual eclipse/occultation events, the satellite is thought to be at least 29% the size of Seilandfarm, which translates into a diameter of approximately 2 kilometers or more.

== Naming ==
This minor planet was named for Seilandfarm, a 50-hectare dairy and cattle farm, located in a hilly terrain, near the Japanese city of Kitami and not far from the observatory where this minor planet was discovered (also see 3785 Kitami). The farm was established by Akio Seino in 1942, and is now operated by four members of the Seino family. The approved naming citation was published by the Minor Planet Center on 14 July 1992 (M.P.C. 20521).
