= 4585 Ainonai =

Main-belt asteroid

Discovery
- Discovered by: K. Endate; K. Watanabe
- Discovery site: Kitami Obs.
- Discovery date: 16 May 1990

Designations
- Named after: Ainonai, near Kitami (Japanese town)
- Alternative designations: 1990 KQ · 1972 LU; 1978 WL_{12} · 1981 LC
- Minor planet category: main-belt · (middle); Chloris

Orbital characteristics
- Epoch 31 May 2020 (JD 2459000.5)
- Uncertainty parameter 0
- Observation arc: 47.87 yr (17,486 d)
- Aphelion: 3.3818 AU
- Perihelion: 2.0894 AU
- Semi-major axis: 2.7356 AU
- Eccentricity: 0.2362
- Orbital period (sidereal): 4.52 yr (1,653 d)
- Mean anomaly: 220.84°
- Mean motion: 0° 13^{m} 4.08^{s} / day
- Inclination: 10.549°
- Longitude of ascending node: 82.966°
- Argument of perihelion: 184.23°

Physical characteristics
- Mean diameter: 10.920±0.122 km
- Synodic rotation period: 38.31±0.05 h
- Geometric albedo: 0.112±0.011
- Spectral type: C (family-based)
- Absolute magnitude (H): 12.8; 12.9

4585 Ainonai (prov. designation: 1990 KQ) is a dark Chloris asteroid, approximately 11 kilometers (6.8 miles) in diameter, located in the central region of the asteroid belt. It was discovered on 16 May 1990, by Japanese amateur astronomers Kin Endate and Kazuro Watanabe at the Kitami Observatory in eastern Hokkaidō, Japan. The presumed carbonaceous C-type asteroid has a longer than average rotation period of 38.3 hours. It was named for the Japanese town of Ainonai, located near the discovering observatory.

== Orbit and classification ==
When applying the hierarchical clustering method to its proper orbital elements, Ainonai is a core member of the Chloris family (509), a smaller family of carbonaceous main-belt asteroids, named after its parent body 410 Chloris. It orbits the Sun in the central asteroid belt at a distance of 2.1–3.4 AU once every 4 years and 6 months (1,653 days; semi-major axis of 2.74 AU). Its orbit has an eccentricity of 0.24 and an inclination of 11° with respect to the ecliptic. The body's observation arc begins with its first observation as 1972 LU at Crimea–Nauchnij on 9 June 1972, or 18 years prior to its official discovery observation at Kitami.

== Naming ==
This minor planet was named after Ainonai, a small Japanese town located near Kitami in eastern Hokkaidō. Asteroids 3785 Kitami and 3720 Hokkaido are named after these two places. The official naming citation was published by the Minor Planet Center on 21 November 1991 (M.P.C. 19338).

== Physical characteristics ==
Ainonai is an assumed carbonaceous C-type asteroid. This agrees with the overall spectral type of the Chloris family.

=== Lightcurve ===
In June 2008, a rotational lightcurve of Ainonai was obtained from photometric observations by James W. Brinsfield at the Via Capote Observatory (G69) in California. Lightcurve analysis gave a rotation period of (38.31±0.05) hours with a brightness variation of (0.30±0.02) magnitude (U=3–).

=== Diameter and albedo ===
According to observations from the NEOWISE mission of NASA's space-based Wide-field Infrared Survey Explorer, Ainonai measures (10.920±0.122) kilometers in diameter and its surface has an albedo of (0.112±0.011). The Collaborative Asteroid Lightcurve Link assumes a standard albedo for a carbonaceous asteroid of 0.057 and calculates a diameter of 14.64 kilometers based on an absolute magnitude of 12.9.
