= Kitami (disambiguation) =

Kitami may refer to the following:

- 3785 Kitami, an asteroid
- Kitami, Hokkaido, a city in Hokkaido, Japan
  - Kitami Station (Hokkaido), a station in Kitami, Hokkaido
  - Kitami Observatory, an astronomical observatory in Kitami, Hokkaido
- Kitami (train), a train service operated in Hokkaido, Japan
- Kitami Station (Tokyo), a station in Tokyo
- Kitami Province, a former province of Hokkaido
