= 9971 Ishihara =

Asteroid

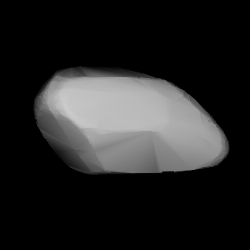
- Shape model of Ishihara from its lightcurve

Discovery
- Discovered by: K. Endate; K. Watanabe
- Discovery site: Kitami Observatory
- Discovery date: 16 April 1993

Designations
- Named after: Takahiro Ishihara (Japanese astronomer)
- Alternative designations: 1993 HS · 1991 YC_{2} 1996 EU_{1}
- Minor planet category: main-belt · Flora

Orbital characteristics
- Epoch 4 September 2017 (JD 2458000.5)
- Uncertainty parameter 0
- Observation arc: 24.91 yr (9,097 days)
- Aphelion: 2.4465 AU
- Perihelion: 1.9164 AU
- Semi-major axis: 2.1814 AU
- Eccentricity: 0.1215
- Orbital period (sidereal): 3.22 yr (1,177 days)
- Mean anomaly: 158.69°
- Mean motion: 0° 18^{m} 21.24^{s} / day
- Inclination: 2.7482°
- Longitude of ascending node: 20.550°
- Argument of perihelion: 246.01°

Physical characteristics
- Dimensions: 4.986±0.053 km 5.012±0.069 km
- Synodic rotation period: 6.715±0.0036 h 6.71574±0.00001 h
- Pole ecliptic latitude: (42.0°, 76.0°) (λ_{1}/β_{1})
- Geometric albedo: 0.2328±0.0281; 0.235±0.027
- Spectral type: S (assumed)
- Absolute magnitude (H): 13.7 · 13.9 · 13.852±0.006 (R) · 14.3

9971 Ishihara (prov. designation: 1993 HS) is a stony Flora asteroid from the inner regions of the asteroid belt, approximately 5 kilometers (3.1 miles) in diameter. It was discovered by Japanese amateur astronomers Kin Endate and Kazuro Watanabe at Kitami Observatory on 16 April 1993, and named after Takahiro Ishihara, president of the astronomical society at Hiroshima.

== Orbit and classification ==
Orbit of Ishihara (blue), inner planets and Jupiter (outermost)

Ishihara is a member of the Flora family, one of the largest families of stony asteroids in the asteroid belt. It orbits the Sun in the inner main-belt at a distance of 1.9–2.4 AU once every 3 years and 3 months (1,177 days). Its orbit has an eccentricity of 0.12 and an inclination of 3° with respect to the ecliptic. It was first identified as 1991 YC_{2} at Karl Schwarzschild Observatory in 1991, extending the body's observation arc by approximately 2 years prior to its official discovery at Kitami.

== Naming ==
This minor planet was named after Takahiro Ishihara (born 1961), an observer of comets, communicator of astronomy, and former president of the astronomical society at Hiroshima (1987–1997). The official naming citation was published by the Minor Planet Center on 6 January 2003 (M.P.C. 47298).

== Physical characteristics ==
=== Rotation and poles ===
In January 2012, a rotational lightcurve of Ishihara was obtained from photometric observations by astronomers at the Palomar Transient Factory in California. Lightcurve analysis gave a rotation period of 6.715±0.0036 hours with a brightness amplitude of 1.06 in magnitude, which indicates that the body has a non-spheroidal shape (U=2).

A 2016-published lightcurve, using modeled photometric data from the Lowell Photometric Database (LPD), gave a concurring period of 6.71574 hours (U=n.a.), as well as a spin axis of (42.0°, 76.0°) in ecliptic coordinates (λ, β).

=== Diameter and albedo ===
According to the survey carried out by NASA's Wide-field Infrared Survey Explorer with its subsequent NEOWISE mission, Ishihara measures 4.986 and 5.012 kilometers in diameter and its surface has an albedo of 0.235 and 0.2328, respectively. The Collaborative Asteroid Lightcurve Link assumes an albedo of 0.24 – derived from 8 Flora, a S-type asteroid and the family's largest member and namesake – and calculates a diameter of 3.74 kilometers with an absolute magnitude of 14.3.
