= Cape Erimo =

Cape in Hokkaidō, Japan

Cape Erimo

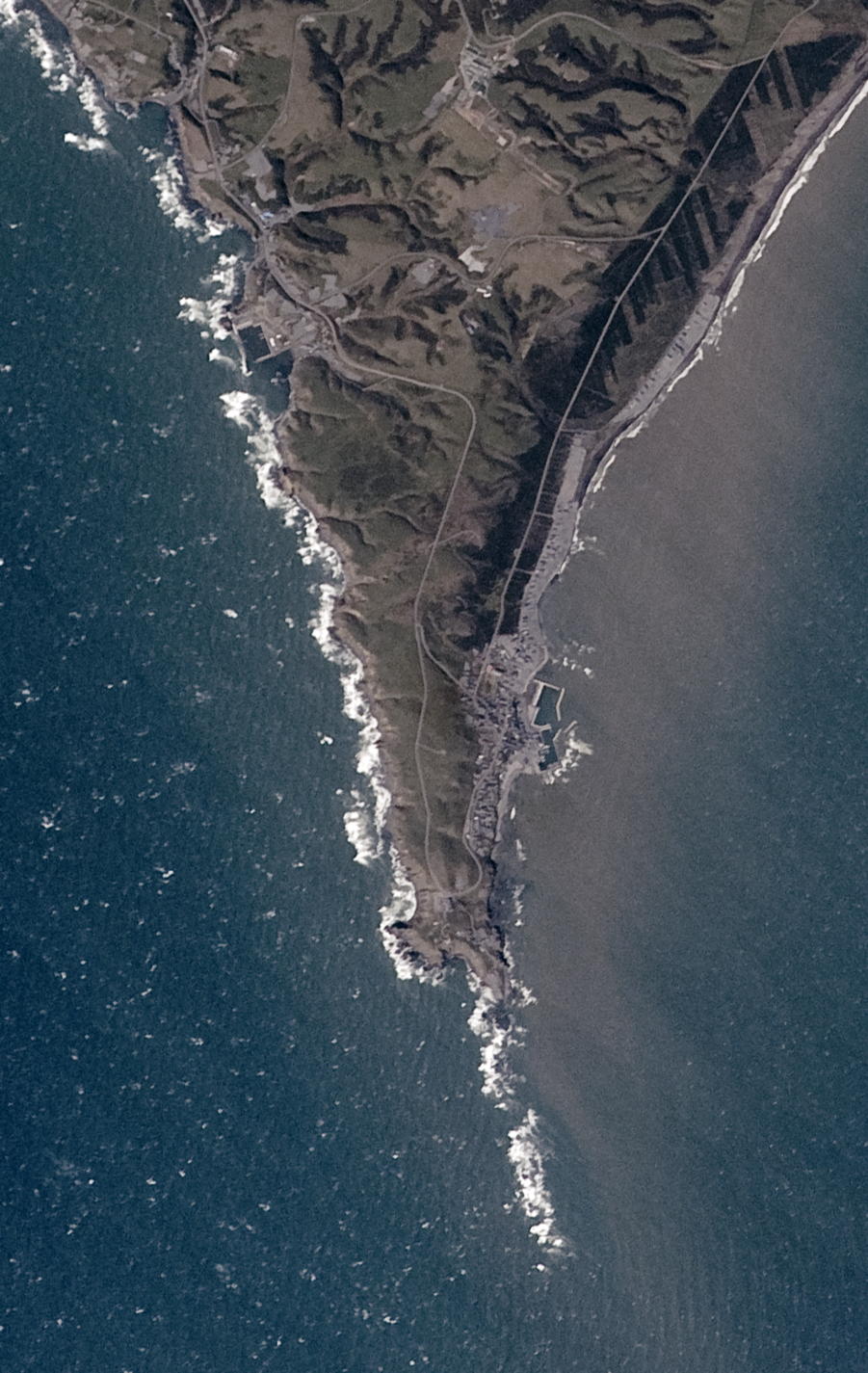
Cape Erimo, taken from the ISS on October 11, 2009

Cape Erimo (襟裳岬, Erimo-misaki) is a cape in Hokkaidō, located at 41.924444°N 143.248333°E. It is the de facto southern tip of Hidaka Mountains.

== Description ==
Hot and cold fronts meet near the cape, thus creating a dense mist which covers the cape for more than 100 days a year. Wind blows here at a speed of 10 m/s (22 mph) for almost 300 days a year. Every year, more than 400,000 tourists visit Cape Erimo. Rare species of Kuril Seals live there.

=== Asteroid ===
The main-belt asteroid 5331 Erimomisaki, discovered by amateur astronomers Kin Endate and Kazuro Watanabe in 1990, was named after Cape Erimo.

== Climate ==
Climate data for Cape Erimo, 1991–2020 normals, extremes 1978–present
| Month | Jan | Feb | Mar | Apr | May | Jun | Jul | Aug | Sep | Oct | Nov | Dec | Year |
|---|---|---|---|---|---|---|---|---|---|---|---|---|---|
| Record high °C (°F) | 10.1 (50.2) | 7.0 (44.6) | 11.8 (53.2) | 14.4 (57.9) | 19.3 (66.7) | 22.3 (72.1) | 25.9 (78.6) | 28.5 (83.3) | 26.2 (79.2) | 23.3 (73.9) | 18.2 (64.8) | 13.6 (56.5) | 28.5 (83.3) |
| Mean daily maximum °C (°F) | 0.2 (32.4) | −0.2 (31.6) | 2.2 (36.0) | 6.1 (43.0) | 10.1 (50.2) | 13.6 (56.5) | 17.5 (63.5) | 19.9 (67.8) | 19.0 (66.2) | 14.7 (58.5) | 9.3 (48.7) | 3.3 (37.9) | 9.6 (49.4) |
| Daily mean °C (°F) | −1.8 (28.8) | −2.2 (28.0) | 0.1 (32.2) | 3.4 (38.1) | 7.2 (45.0) | 11.1 (52.0) | 15.2 (59.4) | 17.7 (63.9) | 16.9 (62.4) | 12.5 (54.5) | 6.8 (44.2) | 1.0 (33.8) | 7.3 (45.2) |
| Mean daily minimum °C (°F) | −4.0 (24.8) | −4.3 (24.3) | −1.9 (28.6) | 1.3 (34.3) | 5.0 (41.0) | 9.0 (48.2) | 13.4 (56.1) | 15.8 (60.4) | 14.9 (58.8) | 10.2 (50.4) | 4.2 (39.6) | −1.3 (29.7) | 5.2 (41.4) |
| Record low °C (°F) | −11.5 (11.3) | −12.1 (10.2) | −10.2 (13.6) | −4.8 (23.4) | −0.5 (31.1) | 3.4 (38.1) | 6.0 (42.8) | 10.5 (50.9) | 7.6 (45.7) | 2.3 (36.1) | −5.1 (22.8) | −11.0 (12.2) | −12.1 (10.2) |
| Average precipitation mm (inches) | 24.3 (0.96) | 16.6 (0.65) | 35.9 (1.41) | 67.8 (2.67) | 99.5 (3.92) | 85.9 (3.38) | 128.8 (5.07) | 129.2 (5.09) | 137.8 (5.43) | 117.0 (4.61) | 85.6 (3.37) | 48.7 (1.92) | 977.1 (38.48) |
| Average precipitation days (≥ 1.0 mm) | 5.8 | 5.0 | 6.7 | 8.4 | 10.0 | 8.3 | 10.6 | 10.4 | 10.2 | 11.0 | 12.2 | 9.0 | 107.6 |
| Mean monthly sunshine hours | 159.5 | 175.9 | 208.1 | 196.9 | 183.6 | 139.3 | 123.0 | 127.8 | 161.4 | 179.6 | 135.2 | 135.1 | 1,926.2 |
Source 1: JMA
Source 2: JMA
