= 3915 Fukushima =

Asteroid

Discovery
- Discovered by: M. Yanai; K. Watanabe
- Discovery site: Kitami Obs.
- Discovery date: 15 August 1988

Designations
- Named after: Hisao Fukushima (Japanese amateur astronomer)
- Alternative designations: 1988 PA_{1} · 1926 GQ; 1935 UL · 1935 UX; 1950 QT · 1975 EX_{5} 1977 TV_{7} · 1977 TW_{3} 1979 FH_{1} · 1983 EM
- Minor planet category: main-belt · (inner)

Orbital characteristics
- Epoch 4 September 2017 (JD 2458000.5)
- Uncertainty parameter 0
- Observation arc: 91.05 yr (33,256 days)
- Aphelion: 2.5392 AU
- Perihelion: 2.3394 AU
- Semi-major axis: 2.4393 AU
- Eccentricity: 0.0410
- Orbital period (sidereal): 3.81 yr (1,392 days)
- Mean anomaly: 238.57°
- Mean motion: 0° 15^{m} 31.32^{s} / day
- Inclination: 14.431°
- Longitude of ascending node: 173.51°
- Argument of perihelion: 143.54°

Physical characteristics
- Dimensions: 20.38±1.6 km (IRAS:9); 21.993±0.052; 22.354±0.031 km 22.82±0.38 km
- Synodic rotation period: 8.40±0.01 h 9.41±0.01 h 9.4177±0.0004 h 9.418±0.001 h
- Geometric albedo: 0.0441±0.0015; 0.046±0.002; 0.051±0.002; 0.0561±0.010 (IRAS:9)
- Spectral type: P · C
- Absolute magnitude (H): 12.2 · 12.3

3915 Fukushima, provisional designation 1988 PA_{1}, is a carbonaceous asteroid from the inner regions of the asteroid belt, approximately 21 kilometers in diameter.

It was discovered on 15 August 1988, by Japanese astronomers Masayuki Yanai and Kazuro Watanabe at the Kitami Observatory in eastern Hokkaido, Japan, and named after amateur astronomer Hisao Fukushima.

== Orbit and classification ==
Fukushima orbits the Sun in the inner main-belt at a distance of 2.3–2.5 AU once every 3 years and 10 months (1,392 days). Its orbit has an eccentricity of 0.04 and an inclination of 14° with respect to the ecliptic. The asteroid was first identified as 1926 GQ at Heidelberg Observatory in 1926, extending the body's observation arc by 62 years prior to its official discovery observation at Kitami.

== Physical characteristics ==
Fukushima has been characterized as a reddish P-type asteroid by the NEOWISE mission of NASA's Wide-field Infrared Survey Explorer. It is also an assumed C-type asteroid.

=== Rotation period ===
Several high-quality rotational lightcurves were obtained from photometric observations since 2003. An observation by Brian D. Warner at the U.S. Palmer Divide Observatory in Colorado rendered a rotation period of 9.418±0.001 hours with a high brightness variation of 0.67 in magnitude (U=3), indicating that the body has a non-spherical shape. This observation concurs with another measurement taken at the Oakley Observatory that rendered a period of 9.41±0.01 and an amplitude of 0.50 mag (U=3), superseding a less accurate lightcurve produced by the PDS of 8.40 hours (U=2). In 2011, an observation by René Roy gave another concurring period of 9.4177±0.0004 hours and an amplitude of 0.79 mag (U=3). On 16 December 2012, the asteroid occulted the star HIP 4315 over parts of Europe and North America. At the time the body's brightness was 16.3 in magnitude (mag) and that of the star was 8.5 mag.

=== Diameter and albedo ===
According to the space-based surveys carried out by the Infrared Astronomical Satellite IRAS, the Japanese Akari satellite, and the NEOWISE mission, the asteroid has a low albedo in the range of 0.044 and 0.056 with a diameter between 20.3 and 22.8 kilometers. The Collaborative Asteroid Lightcurve Link gives preference to the results obtained by IRAS with an albedo of 0.0561 and a diameter of 20.38 kilometers.

== Naming ==
This minor planet was named in honor of Japanese researcher and amateur astronomer, Hisao Fukushima (1910–1997), known for his research in hydrodynamics. He was professor emeritus at Hokkaido University, and, as an active amateur astronomer, a member of the Hokkaido Astronomical Liaison Group. The approved naming citation was published by the Minor Planet Center on 23 December 1988 (M.P.C. 14030).
