= 6980 Kyusakamoto =

Main-belt asteroid

Discovery
- Discovered by: K. Endate; K. Watanabe
- Discovery site: Kitami Obs.
- Discovery date: 16 September 1993

Designations
- Named after: Kyu Sakamoto (Japanese singer)
- Alternative designations: 1993 SV_{1} · 1979 WH_{7} 1988 RU_{13}
- Minor planet category: main-belt · Koronis

Orbital characteristics
- Epoch 4 September 2017 (JD 2458000.5)
- Uncertainty parameter 0
- Observation arc: 36.98 yr (13,508 days)
- Aphelion: 2.9663 AU
- Perihelion: 2.7030 AU
- Semi-major axis: 2.8347 AU
- Eccentricity: 0.0464
- Orbital period (sidereal): 4.77 yr (1,743 days)
- Mean anomaly: 62.052°
- Mean motion: 0° 12^{m} 23.4^{s} / day
- Inclination: 3.2909°
- Longitude of ascending node: 97.461°
- Argument of perihelion: 211.58°
- T_{Jupiter}: 3.3080

Physical characteristics
- Dimensions: 8.791±0.081 km 8.98 km (calculated)
- Synodic rotation period: 3.2526±0.0042 h (R); 3.2529±0.0042 h (S)
- Geometric albedo: 0.24 (assumed); 0.301±0.037
- Spectral type: S
- Absolute magnitude (H): 12.2 · 12.367±0.002 (R) · 12.4 · 12.45±0.07 · 12.966±0.003 (S)

6980 Kyusakamoto, provisional designation 1993 SV_{1}, is a stony Koronis asteroid from the outer region of the asteroid belt, approximately 9 kilometers in diameter. It was discovered by Japanese astronomers Kin Endate and Kazuro Watanabe at Kitami Observatory on 16 September 1993. The asteroid was named after Japanese singer Kyu Sakamoto.

== Orbit and classification ==
Kyusakamoto is a member of the Koronis family, which is named after 158 Koronis and consists of about 300 known bodies with nearly ecliptical orbits. It orbits the Sun in the outer main-belt at a distance of 2.7–3.0 AU once every 4 years and 9 months (1,743 days). Its orbit has an eccentricity of 0.05 and an inclination of 3° with respect to the ecliptic.

In November 1979, it was first identified as 1979 WH_{7} at Crimea–Nauchnij, extending the body's observation arc by 14 years prior to its official discovery observation at Kitami.

== Physical characteristics ==
=== Rotation period ===
In August 2012, a rotational lightcurve of Kyusakamoto was obtained through photometric observations at the Palomar Transient Factory, California. The lightcurve showed a period of 3.2529±0.0042 hours with a brightness amplitude of 0.40 in magnitude (U=2). In the Mould-R filter (R), a different photometric band, the observations rendered a nearly identical period of 3.2526±0.0042 hours with an amplitude of 0.41 (U=2).

=== Diameter and albedo ===
According to the survey carried out by the NEOWISE mission of NASA's space-based Wide-field Infrared Survey Explorer, Kyusakamoto measures 8.8 kilometers in diameter and its surface has a high albedo of 0.30, while the Collaborative Asteroid Lightcurve Link assumes a stony albedo of 0.24 and calculates a slightly larger diameter of 9.0 kilometers.

== Naming ==
This minor planet was named in memory of Japanese popular singer Kyu Sakamoto (1941–1985), who died in the crash of Japan Air Lines Flight 123, the deadliest single-aircraft accident in history. Adored as "Kyu-chan", he is best known for his hit, I Look Up As I Walk ("Sukiyaki"), which became a worldwide bestseller. The naming also refers to his collaborators Rokusuke Ei and Hachidai Nakamura, songwriter and pianist, respectively. The official naming citation was published by the Minor Planet Center on 5 October 1998 (M.P.C. 32789).
