= 6500 Kodaira =

Asteroid

Discovery
- Discovered by: K. Endate; K. Watanabe
- Discovery site: Kitami Obs.
- Discovery date: 15 March 1993

Designations
- Named after: Keiichi Kodaira (Japanese astronomer)
- Alternative designations: 1993 ET · 1970 GE_{1} 1973 ST_{5}
- Minor planet category: Mars-crosser

Orbital characteristics
- Epoch 4 September 2017 (JD 2458000.5)
- Uncertainty parameter 0
- Observation arc: 47.15 yr (17,222 days)
- Aphelion: 3.9033 AU
- Perihelion: 1.6061 AU
- Semi-major axis: 2.7547 AU
- Eccentricity: 0.4170
- Orbital period (sidereal): 4.57 yr (1,670 days)
- Mean anomaly: 181.45°
- Mean motion: 0° 12^{m} 56.16^{s} / day
- Inclination: 29.321°
- Longitude of ascending node: 186.12°
- Argument of perihelion: 255.49°

Physical characteristics
- Dimensions: 9.487±2.081; 16.81 km (calculated)
- Synodic rotation period: 5.3983±0.0026 h 5.3988±0.0002 h 5.400±0.001 h 5.496±0.009 h
- Geometric albedo: 0.057 (assumed); 0.151±0.110
- Spectral type: SMASS = B · B
- Absolute magnitude (H): 12.39±0.21 · 12.6 · 12.640±0.007 (R)

6500 Kodaira, provisional designation 1993 ET, is a highly eccentric, rare-type asteroid and sizable Mars-crosser from the central regions of the asteroid belt, approximately 10 kilometers in diameter. It was discovered on 15 March 1993, by Japanese amateur astronomers Kin Endate and Kazuro Watanabe at Kitami Observatory in eastern Hokkaidō, Japan. It was named for Japanese astronomer Keiichi Kodaira.

== Orbit and classification ==
Kodaira orbits the Sun at a distance of 1.6–3.9 AU once every 4 years and 7 months (1,670 days). Its orbit has an eccentricity of 0.42 and an inclination of 29° with respect to the ecliptic.

In April 1970, it was first identified as 1970 GE_{1} at the Chilean Cerro El Roble Station, extending the body's observation arc by 23 years prior to its official discovery observation at Kitami.

== Physical characteristics ==
In the SMASS classification, Kodaira is carbonaceous and uncommon B-type asteroid, of which only a few dozen bodies are currently known.

=== Rotation period ===
In October 2014, a rotational lightcurve of Kodaira was obtained from photometric observations by American astronomer Robert Stephens at the Center for Solar System Studies (U81) in California. Lightcurve analysis gave a well-defined rotation period of 5.400 hours with a brightness variation of 0.78 magnitude (U=3).

Previous observations at Montgomery College Observatory (MCO), the Preston Gott and McDonald Observatories, and at the Palomar Transient Factory gave similar periods between 5.398 and 5.496 hours (U=3-/3-/2).

=== Diameter and albedo ===
According to first-year results from the NEOWISE mission of NASA's Wide-field Infrared Survey Explorer, Kodaira measures 9.5 kilometers in diameter and its surface has an albedo of 0.15, while the Collaborative Asteroid Lightcurve Link assumes a standard albedo for carbonaceous asteroids of 0.057 and calculates a diameter of 16.8 kilometers with an absolute magnitude of 12.6.

== Naming ==
This minor planet was named after Keiichi Kodaira (born 1937), Japanese astronomer and director of NAOJ, whose interests lie in astrophysics and galactic physics.

In the 1980s, Kodaira was head of IAU's commission of Theory of Stellar Atmospheres (comm. 36). He was also instrumental for the completion of the Subaru Telescope project, of which he was the scientific director since its inception. The approved naming citation was published by the Minor Planet Center on 1 June 1996 (M.P.C. 27331).
