= 6498 Ko =

Main-belt asteroid

Discovery
- Discovered by: K. Endate; K. Watanabe
- Discovery site: Kitami Obs.
- Discovery date: 26 October 1992

Designations
- Named after: Ko Nagasawa (Japanese scientist)
- Alternative designations: 1992 UJ_{4} · 1964 PM; 1971 QK_{3} · 1994 CD_{4}
- Minor planet category: main-belt · Flora

Orbital characteristics
- Epoch 4 September 2017 (JD 2458000.5)
- Uncertainty parameter 0
- Observation arc: 62.24 yr (22,734 days)
- Aphelion: 2.6660 AU
- Perihelion: 1.8955 AU
- Semi-major axis: 2.2807 AU
- Eccentricity: 0.1689
- Orbital period (sidereal): 3.44 yr (1,258 days)
- Mean anomaly: 149.16°
- Mean motion: 0° 17^{m} 9.96^{s} / day
- Inclination: 7.9910°
- Longitude of ascending node: 149.63°
- Argument of perihelion: 156.73°

Physical characteristics
- Dimensions: 3.99 km (calculated)
- Synodic rotation period: 500 h (Note: Pravec (2012): rotation period of 500 hours with a brightness amplitude of 0.6 magnitude. CALL assigned a quality-code Q of 2 to the measurement, which means, that the result is based on less than full coverage, and that the period may be wrong by 30 percent or so. Summary figures for (6498) Ko at Collaborative Asteroid Lightcurve Link (CALL) and Pravec, P.; Wolf, M.; Sarounova, L. (2012)) (Note: Pravec (2012): alternative lightcurve plot with a period of 250 hours at Pravec, P.; Wolf, M.; Sarounova, L. (2012))
- Geometric albedo: 0.24 (assumed)
- Spectral type: S
- Absolute magnitude (H): 13.5 · 13.71 · 13.92±0.47 · 14.16

6498 Ko, provisional designation 1992 UJ_{4}, is a stony Flora asteroid and exceptionally slow rotator from the inner regions of the asteroid belt, approximately 4 kilometers in diameter. The asteroid was discovered on 26 October 1992, by Japanese amateur astronomers Kin Endate and Kazuro Watanabe at Kitami Observatory on eastern Hokkaidō, Japan. It was named for Japanese scientist Ko Nagasawa.

== Orbit and classification ==
Ko is a member of the Flora family, one of the largest groups of stony asteroids in the main-belt. It orbits the Sun in the inner main-belt at a distance of 1.9–2.7 AU once every 3 years and 5 months (1,258 days). Its orbit has an eccentricity of 0.17 and an inclination of 8° with respect to the ecliptic.

A first precovery was taken at Palomar Observatory in 1954, extending the asteroid's observation arc by 38 years prior to its discovery.

=== Minor-planet close approaches ===
Although Ko does not cross the orbit of any planet, it does make close approaches to other large asteroids, such as 29 Amphitrite, which it approached within 0.038 AU in 1915. Further close approaches will take place in 2025 and 2135 at a distance of 0.012 and 0.009 AU, respectively. On 14 November 2009, the asteroid also made a close encounter with 3 Juno at a distance of about 0.047 AU.

== Physical characteristics ==
=== Slow rotator ===
A rotational lightcurve of Ko was obtained from photometric observations by Czech astronomer Petr Pravec at the Ondřejov Observatory in June 2012. It rendered an exceptionally long rotation period of 500 hours with a brightness amplitude of 0.6 in magnitude (U=2).

=== Diameter and albedo ===
The Collaborative Asteroid Lightcurve Link assumes an albedo of 0.24, derived from the Flora family's largest member and namesake, the asteroid 8 Flora, and calculates a diameter of 4.0 kilometers with an absolute magnitude of 14.16.

== Naming ==
This minor planet was named in honor of Japanese scientist Ko Nagasawa (born 1932), who became a keen researcher of meteors and workes for the Public Information Office at the National Astronomical Observatory of Japan, after retiring from the Earthquake Research Institute, University of Tokyo in 1994.

At the Dodaira Station, after which the minor planet 14313 Dodaira is named, Ko has obtained numerous photographic spectra of the 1965-Leonid meteor shower. The minor planet's name was proposed by the second discoverer, Kazuro Watanabe, following a suggestion by Japanese astronomer Kōichirō Tomita. The approved naming citation was published by the Minor Planet Center on 20 June 1997 (M.P.C. 30099).
