= 14436 Morishita =

Main-belt asteroid

Discovery
- Discovered by: K. Endate; K. Watanabe
- Discovery site: Kitami Obs.
- Discovery date: 23 March 1992

Designations
- Named after: Yoko Morishita (amateur astronomer)
- Alternative designations: 1992 FC_{2} · 1998 TN_{28} 2000 AU_{60}
- Minor planet category: main-belt · (middle) background

Orbital characteristics
- Epoch 4 September 2017 (JD 2458000.5)
- Uncertainty parameter 0
- Observation arc: 25.19 yr (9,202 days)
- Aphelion: 3.1509 AU
- Perihelion: 1.9961 AU
- Semi-major axis: 2.5735 AU
- Eccentricity: 0.2244
- Orbital period (sidereal): 4.13 yr (1,508 days)
- Mean anomaly: 43.027°
- Mean motion: 0° 14^{m} 19.32^{s} / day
- Inclination: 1.8554°
- Longitude of ascending node: 353.83°
- Argument of perihelion: 208.24°

Physical characteristics
- Dimensions: 3.49 km (calculated); 5.656±0.247 km
- Synodic rotation period: 972.8085±34.9213 h
- Geometric albedo: 0.152±0.035; 0.20 (assumed)
- Spectral type: S
- Absolute magnitude (H): 13.9 · 14.1 · 14.201±0.010 (R) · 14.41±0.23 · 14.65

14436 Morishita, provisional designation 1992 FC_{2}, is a stony background asteroid and exceptionally slow rotator from the middle region of the asteroid belt, approximately 5 kilometers in diameter.

It was discovered on 23 March 1992, by Japanese astronomers Kin Endate and Kazuro Watanabe at Kitami Observatory in Japan, and named after amateur astronomer Yoko Morishita.

== Orbit and classification ==
Morishita is a S-type asteroid that orbits the Sun in the central main-belt at a distance of 2.0–3.2 AU once every 4 years and 2 months (1,508 days). Its orbit has an eccentricity of 0.22 and an inclination of 2° with respect to the ecliptic. As no precoveries were taken, and no prior identifications were made, the body's observation arc begins with its official discovery observation.

== Photometry ==
In October 2010, a rotational lightcurve of Morishita was obtained from photometric observations at the Palomar Transient Factory in California. Lightcurve analysis gave an exceptionally long rotation period of 972.8 hours with a brightness amplitude of 0.82 magnitude, indicative for a non-spheroidal shape (U=2).

== Diameter and albedo ==
According to the survey carried out by NASA's Wide-field Infrared Survey Explorer with its subsequent NEOWISE mission, Morishita measures 5.656 kilometers in diameter and its surface has an albedo of 0.152, while the Collaborative Asteroid Lightcurve Link assumes a standard albedo for stony asteroids of 0.20 and calculates a shorter diameter of 3.49 kilometers.

== Naming ==
This minor planet was named for Yoko Morishita (born 1947), amateur astronomer and supporter of the Astronomical Society of Shikoku, where she has made many contributions to further the spread of astronomical awareness. The approved naming citation was published by the Minor Planet Center on 25 April 2013 (M.P.C. 83583).
