= 5331 Erimomisaki =

Asteroid

Discovery
- Discovered by: Kin Endate; K. Watanabe
- Discovery site: Kitami Obs.
- Discovery date: 27 January 1990

Designations
- Named after: Cape Erimo (Hokkaidō, Japan)
- Alternative designations: 1990 BT_{1} · 1984 YY_{2}
- Minor planet category: main-belt · (middle) background

Orbital characteristics
- Epoch 23 March 2018 (JD 2458200.5)
- Uncertainty parameter 0
- Observation arc: 33.33 yr (12,174 d)
- Aphelion: 3.8450 AU
- Perihelion: 1.6826 AU
- Semi-major axis: 2.7638 AU
- Eccentricity: 0.3912
- Orbital period (sidereal): 4.59 yr (1,678 d)
- Mean anomaly: 102.26°
- Mean motion: 0° 12^{m} 52.2^{s} / day
- Inclination: 12.099°
- Longitude of ascending node: 109.79°
- Argument of perihelion: 283.14°

Physical characteristics
- Mean diameter: 9.208±0.323 km 9.549±2.062 km 10.57±0.15 km 16.81 km (calculated)
- Synodic rotation period: 24.233±0.004 h 24.26±0.02 h
- Geometric albedo: 0.057 (assumed); 0.2018±0.0967; 0.202±0.035; 0.2284±0.0416; 0.253±0.009
- Spectral type: C (assumed)
- Absolute magnitude (H): 12.00; 12.4; 12.5; 12.60; 13.19±0.14

5331 Erimomisaki, provisional designation 1990 BT_{1}, is a background asteroid on an eccentric orbit from the central regions of the asteroid belt, approximately 10 kilometers (6 miles) in diameter. It was discovered on 27 January 1990, by Japanese amateur astronomers Kin Endate and Kazuro Watanabe at the Kitami Observatory on Hokkaidō, Japan. The asteroid has a longer-than-average rotation period of 24.26 hours. It was named after Cape Erimo at the southern tip of Hokkaidō.

== Orbit and classification ==
Erimomisaki is a non-family asteroid from the main belt's background population. It orbits the Sun in the central main-belt at a distance of 1.7–3.8 AU once every 4 years and 7 months (1,678 days; semi-major axis of 2.76 AU). Its orbit has a relatively high eccentricity of 0.39 and an inclination of 12° with respect to the ecliptic.

The body's observation arc begins with its first observation as 1984 YY_{2} at Crimea–Nauchnij in December 1984, more than 5 years prior to its official discovery observation at Kitami.

== Physical characteristics ==
Erimomisaki's spectral type is unknown. The Collaborative Asteroid Lightcurve Link (CALL) generically assumes it to be a carbonaceous C-type asteroid (as its semi-major axis is larger than 2.7 AU). However, based on the body's albedo (see below), it is rather a stony S-type asteroid.

=== Rotation period ===
In December 2007, two rotational lightcurve of Erimomisaki were obtained from photometric observations by international collaboration between astronomers Silvano Casulli, Russel Durkee, Caleb Boe, Fiona Vincent and David Higgins. Lightcurve analysis gave a longer-than-average rotation period of 24.233 and 24.26 hours with a brightness amplitude of 0.42 and 0.27 magnitude, respectively (U=2/3-). CALL adopts the longer period as its best result. While not being a slow rotator, Erimomisaki's period is longer than that of most other asteroids, which have spin rates between 2 and 20 hours.

=== Diameter and albedo ===
According to the surveys carried out by the Japanese Akari satellite and the NEOWISE mission of NASA's Wide-field Infrared Survey Explorer, Erimomisaki measures between 9.208 and 10.57 kilometers in diameter and its surface has an albedo between 0.2018 and 0.253. CALL generically assumes a carbonaceous albedo of 0.057 and consequently calculates a much larger diameter of 16.81 kilometers based on an absolute magnitude of 12.6.

== Naming ==
This minor planet was named after Cape Erimo (Japanese: Erimo-misaki) at the south end of Hokkaidō, Japan. The official naming citation was published by the Minor Planet Center on 1 September 1993 (M.P.C. 22508).
