= 5481 Kiuchi =

Bright binary Vestian asteroid

Discovery
- Discovered by: K. Endate; K. Watanabe
- Discovery site: Kitami Obs.
- Discovery date: 15 February 1990

Designations
- Named after: Tsuruhiko Kiuchi (Japanese amateur astronomer)
- Alternative designations: 1990 CH · 1970 SR
- Minor planet category: main-belt · Vesta

Orbital characteristics
- Epoch 4 September 2017 (JD 2458000.5)
- Uncertainty parameter 0
- Observation arc: 46.14 yr (16,851 days)
- Aphelion: 2.4858 AU
- Perihelion: 2.1936 AU
- Semi-major axis: 2.3397 AU
- Eccentricity: 0.0624
- Orbital period (sidereal): 3.58 yr (1,307 days)
- Mean anomaly: 194.33°
- Mean motion: 0° 16^{m} 31.44^{s} / day
- Inclination: 5.9569°
- Longitude of ascending node: 326.10°
- Argument of perihelion: 250.69°
- Known satellites: 1 (D_{s}/D_{p} 0.33, P: 20.90 h)

Physical characteristics
- Mean diameter: 3.86 km (calculated)
- Synodic rotation period: 3.6196±0.0002 h
- Geometric albedo: 0.40 (assumed)
- Spectral type: V
- Absolute magnitude (H): 12.98±0.1 (R) · 13.4 · 13.676±0.062 · 13.73±0.29

5481 Kiuchi, provisional designation 1990 CH, is a bright binary Vestian asteroid from the inner regions of the asteroid belt, approximately 4 kilometers (2.5 miles) in diameter. It was discovered on 15 February 1990, by Japanese astronomers Kin Endate and Kazuro Watanabe at Kitami Observatory in Hokkaidō, Japan, and named after their colleague Tsuruhiko Kiuchi. The V-type asteroid has a rotation period of 3.6 hours.

== Family and orbit ==
Kiuchi is a bright core member of the Vesta family, one of the main-belt's largest families. It orbits the Sun in the inner main-belt at a distance of 2.2–2.5 AU once every 3 years and 7 months (1,307 days). Its orbit has an eccentricity of 0.06 and an inclination of 6° with respect to the ecliptic. It was first identified as 1970 SR at Crimea–Nauchnij in 1970, extending the body's observation arc by 20 years prior to its official discovery observation at Kitami.

== Naming ==
This minor planet was named in honor of Japanese amateur astronomer and discoverer of comets, Tsuruhiko Kiuchi (born 1954), who is known for the rediscovery of the periodic Perseid Comet Swift–Tuttle, a previously lost comet (also see naming citations for 5035 Swift and 5036 Tuttle). Based on a prediction by Brian Marsden, Kiuchi made this rediscovery in 1992, using only binoculars. The approved naming citation was published by the Minor Planet Center on 1 September 1993 (M.P.C. 22510).

== Binary asteroid ==
=== Satellite ===
In March 2008, a lightcurve of Kiuchi was obtained from photometric observations by astronomers Peter Kušnirák and Petr Pravec at Ondřejov Observatory in the Czech Republic, by Julian Oey at Leura Observatory, Australia, by Robert Stephens at Goat Mountain, California, by Mark Husárik at Skalnaté pleso Observatory, Slovakia, and by Judit Györgyey Ries at McDonald Observatory, Texas.

These photometric observations revealed, that Kiuchi is a synchronous binary asteroid with a minor-planet moon orbiting it every 20.90 hours based on mutual eclipsing and occultation events. The satellite's diameter is about a third of that of Kiuchi, which translates into 1.3 kilometers (secondary-to-primary mean-diameter ratio of 0.33±0.02).

=== Primary ===
According to the surveys carried out by PanSTARRS, Kiuchi is a bright V-type asteroid. The Collaborative Asteroid Lightcurve Link assumes an albedo of 0.40 and calculates a diameter of 3.86 kilometers, using an absolute magnitude of 13.676 from Petr Pravec's revised WISE data.

Kiuchi itself has a rotation period of 3.6196±0.0002 hours with a small brightness variation of 0.1 magnitude, indicating a nearly spheroidal shape (U=n.a.). Photometric follow-up observations by Petr Pravec confirmed the results in 2013 and 2016, giving a period of 3.6198 and 3.6196 hours with an amplitude of 0.08 and 0.1 magnitude, and an orbital period for the satellite of 20.9 and 20.9062 hours, respectively (U=3/n.a.). (Note: Pravec (2013) web: rotation period 3.6198±0.0003 hours with a brightness amplitude of 0.08 mag. Summary figures for (5481) Kiuchi at Collaborative Asteroid Lightcurve Link (CALL))
