= 4547 Massachusetts =

Dark background asteroid from the central regions of the asteroid belt

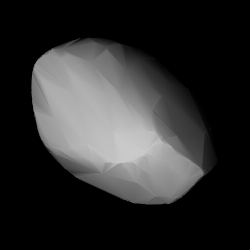
- Massachusetts modeled from its lightcurve

Discovery
- Discovered by: K. Watanabe; K. Endate
- Discovery site: JCPM Sapporo Stn. (392)
- Discovery date: 16 May 1990

Designations
- Named after: Massachusetts (List of U.S. states)
- Alternative designations: 1990 KP · 1958 TW; 1960 ED · 1962 UF; 1974 TD · 1977 FB_{2} 1979 UJ_{2} · 1985 DC_{2} 1987 SP_{13} · A909 BG
- Minor planet category: main-belt · (middle) background

Orbital characteristics
- Epoch 4 September 2017 (JD 2458000.5)
- Uncertainty parameter 0
- Observation arc: 108.42 yr (39,602 days)
- Aphelion: 2.7966 AU
- Perihelion: 2.4305 AU
- Semi-major axis: 2.6136 AU
- Eccentricity: 0.0700
- Orbital period (sidereal): 4.23 yr (1,543 days)
- Mean anomaly: 346.61°
- Mean motion: 0° 13^{m} 59.88^{s} / day
- Inclination: 18.016°
- Longitude of ascending node: 358.31°
- Argument of perihelion: 37.908°

Physical characteristics
- Mean diameter: 21.85±6.57 km 24.13 km (derived); 24.37±2.8 km 25.52±0.52 km 31.41±10.35 km 31.69±0.72 km 33.036±0.214 km 33.395±0.169 km
- Synodic rotation period: 7.703±0.005 h 7.75±0.02 h
- Geometric albedo: 0.039±0.010; 0.0398±0.0077; 0.04±0.04; 0.06±0.03; 0.068±0.013; 0.0695 (derived); 0.073±0.004; 0.1184±0.032
- Spectral type: SMASS = X · P
- Absolute magnitude (H): 11.00 · 11.50 · 11.60 · 11.7 · 11.95

4547 Massachusetts (prov. designation: 1990 KP) is a dark background asteroid from the central regions of the asteroid belt, approximately 24 kilometers (15 miles) in diameter. It was discovered on 16 May 1990, by Japanese astronomers Kin Endate and Kazuro Watanabe at the JCPM Sapporo Station (392) on the island of Hokkaido, Japan. The asteroid was named for the U.S. state of Massachusetts.

== Orbit and classification ==
Massachusetts is a non-family asteroid of the main belt's background population. It orbits the Sun in the central asteroid belt at a distance of 2.4–2.8 AU once every 4 years and 3 months (1,543 days). Its orbit has an eccentricity of 0.07 and an inclination of 18° with respect to the ecliptic. The asteroid was first observed as 1969 TF at Crimea-Nauchnij in October 1969. The body's observation arc also begins at Nauchnij in October 1980, more than seven years prior to its official discovery observation at Sapporo.

== Naming ==
This minor planet was named after Massachusetts, the U.S. state in which the Minor Planet Center (MPC) is located. In the late 19th century, there had been an agricultural and technological knowledge transfer from Massachusetts to Hokkaido, where this asteroid was discovered. The Japanese island of Hokkaido and Massachusetts also have a sister-state relationship since 1990. The official naming citation was published by the MPC on 21 November 1991 (M.P.C. 19337).

== Physical characteristics ==
In the SMASS classification, Massachusetts is an X-type asteroid, while the Wide-field Infrared Survey Explorer (WISE) characterizes it as a primitive P-type asteroid with an albedo of 0.0398.

=== Rotation period ===
Photometric observations of Massachusetts during January 2006, by American Brian Warner at the Palmer Divide Observatory (716) in Colorado Springs, Colorado, were used to generate a well-defined lightcurve with a rotation period of 7.703 hours and a variation in brightness of 0.29 magnitude. (Note: Lightcurve plot of 4547 Massachusetts, Palmer Divide Observatory, Brian D. Warner (2006). Rotation period 7.703±0.005 hours with a brightness amplitude of 0.29±0.02 mag. Quality Code of 3. Summary figures for (4547) Massachusetts at Collaborative Asteroid Lightcurve Link (CALL).)

In February 2006, photometric observations by French amateur astronomer Pierre Antonini, gave a concurring period of 7.75 hours with a brightness amplitude of 0.27 magnitude (U=3-).

=== Diameter and albedo ===
According to the surveys carried out by the Infrared Astronomical Satellite IRAS, the Japanese Akari satellite and the NEOWISE mission of NASA's WISE telescope, Massachusetts measures between 21.85 and 33.395 kilometers in diameter and its surface has an albedo between 0.039 and 0.1184. The Collaborative Asteroid Lightcurve Link derives an albedo of 0.0695 and a diameter of 24.13 kilometers based on an absolute magnitude of 11.6.
