= 5692 Shirao =

Asteroid

Discovery
- Discovered by: K. Endate; K. Watanabe
- Discovery site: Kitami Obs.
- Discovery date: 23 March 1992

Designations
- Named after: Motomaro Shirao (geologist, photographer)
- Alternative designations: 1992 FR · 1949 KK; 1966 FO · 1966 FS; 1970 CH · 1976 SN_{2} 1979 HT_{2} · 1979 HV_{1} 1985 UW_{2} · 1989 SO_{9}
- Minor planet category: main-belt · Eunomia

Orbital characteristics
- Epoch 4 September 2017 (JD 2458000.5)
- Uncertainty parameter 0
- Observation arc: 67.83 yr (24,776 days)
- Aphelion: 3.1373 AU
- Perihelion: 2.1723 AU
- Semi-major axis: 2.6548 AU
- Eccentricity: 0.1818
- Orbital period (sidereal): 4.33 yr (1,580 days)
- Mean anomaly: 287.13°
- Mean motion: 0° 13^{m} 40.44^{s} / day
- Inclination: 11.931°
- Longitude of ascending node: 181.78°
- Argument of perihelion: 44.251°

Physical characteristics
- Dimensions: 9.17 km (calculated); 9.548±0.155; 9.75±0.30 km 9.811±0.063 km
- Synodic rotation period: 2.886±0.002 h 2.8878±0.0004 h (Note: Warner (2014l) web: rotation period 2.8878±0.0004 hours with a brightness amplitude of 0.16 mag. Summary figures for (5692) Shirao at Collaborative Asteroid Lightcurve Link (CALL) and (2014MPBu...41..235P)); 2.90±0.02 h (ii)
- Geometric albedo: 0.21 (assumed); 0.2218±0.0290; 0.223±0.030
- Spectral type: S
- Absolute magnitude (H): 12.3 · 12.47±0.25 · 12.5

5692 Shirao, provisional designation 1992 FR, is a stony Eunomia asteroid from the middle region of the asteroid belt, approximately 9 kilometers in diameter. It was discovered on 23 March 1992, by Japanese amateur astronomers Kin Endate and Kazuro Watanabe at Kitami Observatory, Hokkaidō, Japan. The asteroid was later named for Japanese geologist and astrophotographer Motomaro Shirao.

== Orbit and classification ==
Shirao is a member of the Eunomia family, a large group of stony asteroids and the most prominent family in the intermediate main-belt. It orbits the Sun in the central main-belt at a distance of 2.2–3.1 AU once every 4 years and 4 months (1,580 days). Its orbit has an eccentricity of 0.18 and an inclination of 12° with respect to the ecliptic.

In 1949, it was first identified as 1949 KK at Goethe Link Observatory. The body's observation arc begins in 1955, with a precovery at Palomar Observatory, 37 years prior to its official discovery observation at Kitami.

== Physical characteristics ==
=== Rotation period ===
In June 2014, a rotational lightcurve of Shirao was obtained from photometric observations made by American astronomer Brian Warner at his Palmer Divide Observatory (716) in Colorado. It gave a well-defined rotation period of 2.8878 hours with a brightness variation of 0.16 magnitude (U=3).

Previous lightcurves were obtained by French astronomer René Roy (2.90 hours, Δ 0.13 mag, U=2) in June 2001, by American astronomer Donald P. Pray (2.886 hours, Δ 0.12 mag, U=2) in March 2005, and by astronomers Dominique Suys, Hugo Riemis and Jan Vantomme (2.90 hours, Δ 0.15 mag, U=2+) in September 2006.

=== Diameter and albedo ===
According to the surveys carried out by NASA's Wide-field Infrared Survey Explorer and its subsequent NEOWISE mission, Shirao measures between 9.5 and 9.8 kilometers in diameter and its surface has an albedo of 0.22, while the Collaborative Asteroid Lightcurve Link assumes a standard albedo of 0.21 – derived from 15 Eunomia, the largest member and namesake of this asteroid family – and calculates a diameter of 9.2 kilometers.

== Naming ==
This minor planet was named after Motomaro Shirao (born 1953), a Japanese geologist and astrophotographer, who is known for his photographs of volcanoes and lunar geological features. The official naming citation was published by the Minor Planet Center on 4 April 1996 (M.P.C. 26930).
