= Tetsuya Fujii =

Japanese astronomer

Minor planets discovered: 22
4645 Tentaikojo	16 September 1990
4676 Uedaseiji	16 September 1990
4714 Toyohiro	29 September 1989
4718 Araki	13 November 1990
4743 Kikuchi	16 February 1988
4750 Mukai	15 December 1990
4971 Hoshinohiroba	30 January 1989
4975 Dohmoto	16 September 1990
5180 Ohno	6 April 1989
5192 Yabuki	4 February 1991
5357 Sekiguchi	2 March 1992
5474 Gingasen	3 December 1988
6246 Komurotoru	13 November 1990
6381 Toyama	21 February 1988
7418 Akasegawa	11 March 1991
9602 Oya	31 October 1991
9871 Jeon	28 February 1992
16439 Yamehoshinokawa	30 January 1989
16449 Kigoyama	29 September 1989
21015 Shigenari	16 October 1988
(29159) 1989 GB	2 April 1989
(37565) 1988 VL_{3}	3 November 1988
all were co-discovered with Kazuro Watanabe

Tetsuya Fujii (藤井哲也, Fujii Tetsuya; born 1960) is a Japanese amateur astronomer and prolific discoverer of minor planets.

From 1988 to 1992, he had discovered a total of 22 numbered asteroids together with his colleague, Kazuro Watanabe, at the Kitami Observatory in the Kitami-Abashiri Region Cultural Centre in eastern Hokkaidō, Japan, where several amateur astronomers have been conducting an active program of astrometric observations of minor planets and comets. He is director of the astronomical club in Kitami, where he also works for the NHK broadcasting office.

The minor planet 4343 Tetsuya, discovered by Seiji Ueda and Hiroshi Kaneda in 1988, was named in his honour.

== See also ==
- 5357 Sekiguchi, an outer main-belt asteroid
- 5474 Gingasen, a Baptistina asteroid
