= Atsushi Takahashi =

Japanese astronomer

Minor planets discovered: 22
4644 Oumu ^{[1]}	September 16, 1990
4677 Hiroshi ^{[1]}	September 26, 1990
4746 Doi ^{[1]}	October 9, 1989
4795 Kihara ^{[1]}	February 7, 1989
4905 Hiromi ^{[1]}	May 15, 1991
5214 Oozora ^{[1]}	November 13, 1990
5750 Kandatai ^{[1]}	April 11, 1991
6049 Toda ^{[1]}	November 2, 1991
6644 Jugaku ^{[1]}	January 5, 1991
6778 Tosamakoto ^{[1]}	October 4, 1989
7826 Kinugasa ^{[1]}	November 2, 1991
10319 Toshiharu ^{[1]}	October 11, 1990
12734 Haruna ^{[1]}	October 29, 1991
13540 Kazukitakahashi ^{[1]}	October 29, 1991
15716 Narahara ^{[1]}	November 29, 1989
15729 Yumikoitahana ^{[1]}	October 16, 1990
20019 Yukiotanaka ^{[1]}	November 2, 1991
23495 Nagaotoshiko ^{[1]}	October 29, 1991
(24726) 1991 VY ^{[1]}	November 2, 1991
(48433) 1989 US_{1} ^{[1]}	October 29, 1989
(73705) 1991 UR_{2} ^{[1]}	October 31, 1991
(129454) 1991 UQ_{2}^{[1]}	October 31, 1991
1. ^{1} with K. Watanabe

Atsushi Takahashi (高橋 篤志, Takahashi Atsushi; born 1965) is a Japanese amateur astronomer and discoverer of minor planets.

He lives in Kitami on the island of Hokkaido in northern Japan, where he observes asteroids and comets at the Kitami Observatory (code 400). Takahashi is a member of the local astronomy club "Hokkaidō Suisei Shōwakusei Kaigi" (北海道彗星・小惑星会議, English: Conference for comets and asteroids Hokkaidō).

With his colleague Kazuro Watanabe, he is credited by the Minor Planet Center with the co-discovery of 22 minor planets between 1989 and 1991, including his lowest numbered discovery, the asteroid 4644 Oumu. Takahashi and Watanabe also discovered the inner main-belt asteroid 5214 Oozora in 1990, while working at Hokkaido Kitami Observatory. 5214 Oozora is named for Super Ōzora, the first express train in Hokkaidō.

At Watanabe's suggestion, the main-belt asteroid 4842 Atsushi, discovered by Seiji Ueda and Hiroshi Kaneda at Kushiro in 1989, was named in Takahashi's honor. Naming citation was published on 1 September 1993 (M.P.C. 22503).
