= 5474 Gingasen =

Asteroid

Discovery
- Discovered by: T. Fujii; K. Watanabe
- Discovery site: Kitami Obs.
- Discovery date: 3 December 1988

Designations
- Named after: Gingasen (railroad track, Japan)
- Alternative designations: 1988 XE_{1} · 1955 YK; 1971 BO_{2}
- Minor planet category: main-belt · Vestian

Orbital characteristics
- Epoch 4 September 2017 (JD 2458000.5)
- Uncertainty parameter 0
- Observation arc: 45.58 yr (16,649 days)
- Aphelion: 2.5439 AU
- Perihelion: 2.2232 AU
- Semi-major axis: 2.3836 AU
- Eccentricity: 0.0673
- Orbital period (sidereal): 3.68 yr (1,344 days)
- Mean anomaly: 219.47°
- Mean motion: 0° 16^{m} 4.08^{s} / day
- Inclination: 6.1443°
- Longitude of ascending node: 246.97°
- Argument of perihelion: 256.31°
- Known satellites: 1 (suspected) (orbital period of 3.1095 h)

Physical characteristics
- Dimensions: 5.05±0.48 km 6.68 km (derived)
- Synodic rotation period: 2.91 h (superseded); 3.6242±0.0003 h (Note: Pravec (2008) web: rotation period 3.6242±0.0003 hours with a brightness amplitude of 0.18 magnitude and a quality code of 3. Summary figures for (5474) Gingasen at Collaborative Asteroid Lightcurve Link (CALL)); 3.6272±0.0015 h 3.628±0.005 h
- Geometric albedo: 0.20 (assumed); 0.480±0.109
- Spectral type: S
- Absolute magnitude (H): 12.70±0.2 (R) · 12.79±0.10 (R) · 12.886±0.002 (R) · 12.90 · 13.1 · 13.14±0.35 · 13.28±0.112

5474 Gingasen, provisional designation 1988 XE_{1}, is a Vestian asteroid and suspected binary system from the inner regions of the asteroid belt, approximately 6 kilometers in diameter.

It was discovered on 3 December 1988, by Japanese amateur astronomers Tetsuya Fujii and Kazuro Watanabe at Kitami Observatory, Japan. It is named for the "Gingasen" railroad track in Japan.

== Classification and orbit ==
Gingasen is a stony S-type asteroid and member of the Vesta family. It orbits the Sun in the inner main-belt at a distance of 2.2–2.5 AU once every 3 years and 8 months (1,344 days). Its orbit has an eccentricity of 0.07 and an inclination of 6° with respect to the ecliptic. First identified as 1955 YK at Alma-Ata (Tian Shan Observatory) in Kazakhstan, Gingasen's first used observation was taken in 1971, when it was identified as 1971 BO_{2} at Cerro El Roble Station in Chile, extending the body's observation arc by 17 years prior to its official discovery observation.

== Physical characteristics ==
=== Diameter and albedo ===
According to the survey carried out by NASA's Wide-field Infrared Survey Explorer with its subsequent NEOWISE mission, Gingasen measures 5.05 kilometers in diameter, and its surface has a high albedo of 0.480, while the Collaborative Asteroid Lightcurve Link assumes a standard albedo for stony asteroids of 0.20 and derives a diameter of 6.68 kilometers with an absolute magnitude of 13.28.

=== Rotation period ===
Four rotational lightcurves of Gingasen were obtained by Petr Pravec, David Higgins and Pedro Sada in 2008, as well as from the Palomar Transient Factory in 2010. The lightcurves gave a well-defined rotation period of 3.624 to 3.628 hours with a brightness variation of 0.11–0.18 in magnitude (U=3/3/3-/2), superseding a previous result by Laurent Bernasconi (U=1-).

=== Suspected binary ===
During the photometric observations in 2008, the astronomers came across strong evidence that Gingasen is likely an asynchronous binary asteroid with an asteroid moon orbiting it every 3.1095 hours. However, no mutual occultation/eclipse events were observed.

== Naming ==
This minor planet was named after a railroad track in Hokkaido. Gingasen means "Milky Way". This 150-km public railroad connects the island's eastern cities. Each station along the line is named for a constellation. The approved naming citation was published by the Minor Planet Center on 4 April 1996 (M.P.C. 26930).
