= Masayuki Yanai =

Japanese astronomer

Minor planets discovered: 27
see § List of discovered minor planets

Masayuki Yanai (箭内 政之, Yanai Masayuki; born 1959) is a Japanese astronomer. He is a prolific co-discoverer of minor planets. One of his co-discoveries is the dark, inner main-belt asteroid 3915 Fukushima. He retired from docent for astronomy at Sapporo Science Center.

The asteroid 4260 Yanai, discovered by Japanese astronomers Seiji Ueda and Hiroshi Kaneda at Kushiro Observatory (399) in 1989, was named in his honor on 8 July 1990 (M.P.C. 16593).

== List of discovered minor planets ==
3867 Shiretoko	16 April 1988	list^{[A]}
3915 Fukushima	15 August 1988	list^{[A]}
4263 Abashiri	7 September 1989	list^{[A]}
4557 Mika	14 December 1987	list^{[A]}
4771 Hayashi	7 September 1989	list^{[A]}
5121 Numazawa	15 January 1989	list^{[A]}
5174 Okugi	16 April 1988	list^{[A]}
5374 Hokutosei	4 January 1989	list^{[A]}
6562 Takoyaki	9 November 1991	list^{[A]}
6707 Shigeru	13 November 1988	list^{[A]}

7828 Noriyositosi	28 September 1992	list^{[A]}
8182 Akita	1 October 1992	list^{[A]}
10117 Tanikawa	1 October 1992	list^{[A]}
11280 Sakurai	9 October 1989	list^{[A]}
11494 Hibiki	2 November 1988	list^{[A]}
11546 Miyoshimachi	28 October 1992	list^{[A]}
12746 Yumeginga	16 November 1992	list^{[A]}
13561 Kudogou	23 September 1992	list^{[A]}
13564 Kodomomiraikan	19 October 1992	list^{[A]}
14441 Atakanoseki	21 September 1992	list^{[A]}

14443 Sekinenomatsu	1 October 1992	list^{[A]}
14901 Hidatakayama	21 September 1992	list^{[A]}
17516 Kogayukihito	28 October 1992	list^{[A]}
22346 Katsumatatakashi	28 September 1992	list^{[A]}
23465 Yamashitakouhei	24 October 1989	list^{[A]}
(24757) 1992 VN	1 November 1992	list^{[A]}
(35143) 1992 UF_{1}	19 October 1992	list^{[A]}
Co-discovery made with:^{A} K. Watanabe

== See also ==
- List of minor planets: 17001–18000
- National Astronomical Observatory of Japan
