= 5357 Sekiguchi =

Asteroid

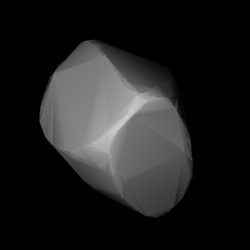
- Shape model of Sekiguchi from its lightcurve

Discovery
- Discovered by: T. Fujii; K. Watanabe
- Discovery site: Kitami Obs.
- Discovery date: 2 March 1992

Designations
- Named after: Tomohiko Sekiguch (Japanese astronomer)
- Alternative designations: 1992 EL · 1969 TB_{4} 1971 BE_{3} · 1981 BH; 1990 VJ_{4} · 1990 WU_{13}
- Minor planet category: main-belt · (outer); Eos

Orbital characteristics
- Epoch 4 September 2017 (JD 2458000.5)
- Uncertainty parameter 0
- Observation arc: 67.13 yr (24,518 days)
- Aphelion: 3.2966 AU
- Perihelion: 2.6794 AU
- Semi-major axis: 2.9880 AU
- Eccentricity: 0.1033
- Orbital period (sidereal): 5.17 yr (1,887 days)
- Mean anomaly: 75.618°
- Mean motion: 0° 11^{m} 26.88^{s} / day
- Inclination: 9.0838°
- Longitude of ascending node: 301.97°
- Argument of perihelion: 116.81°

Physical characteristics
- Mean diameter: 13.948±0.118 km 14.281±0.193 km 14.52±0.65 km 15.19±1.13 km
- Synodic rotation period: 5.4048±0.0011 h 5.4100±0.0011 h 5.41±0.01 h
- Geometric albedo: 0.192±0.032; 0.334±0.052; 0.3829±0.0259
- Spectral type: C
- Absolute magnitude (H): 10.9 · 11.60 · 11.624±0.002 (R) · 11.7 · 11.719±0.003 (R)

5357 Sekiguchi (prov. designation: 1992 EL) is an Eos asteroid from the outer region of the asteroid belt, approximately 15 kilometers (9 miles) in diameter. It was discovered on 2 March 1992, by Japanese amateur astronomers Tetsuya Fujii and Kazuro Watanabe at the Kitami Observatory in eastern Hokkaidō, Japan. The asteroid was later named after Japanese astronomer Tomohiko Sekiguch.

== Orbit and classification ==
Sekiguchi is a member the Eos family (606), the largest asteroid family of the outer main belt consisting of nearly 10,000 asteroids. It orbits the Sun at a distance of 2.7–3.3 AU once every 5 years and 2 months (1,887 days). Its orbit has an eccentricity of 0.10 and an inclination of 9° with respect to the ecliptic. The first precovery was obtained at Goethe Link Observatory in 1950, extending the asteroid's observation arc by 42 years prior to its discovery.

== Naming ==
This minor planet was named in honor of Japanese astronomer Tomohiko Sekiguch (born 1970), associate professor at Hokkaido University. From 1998 to 2001, he had been observing minor planets at the European Southern Observatory. The official naming citation was published by the Minor Planet Center on 6 April 2012 (M.P.C. 79102).

== Physical characteristics ==
=== Rotation period ===
In October 2005, a rotational lightcurve of Sekiguchi was obtained from photometric observations by French amateur astronomers René Roy and Laurent Bernasconi. Lightcurve analysis gave a well-defined rotation period of 5.41 hours with a brightness variation of 0.72 magnitude (U=3).

In October 2010 and November 2011, two more lightcurves were obtained at the Palomar Transient Factory, rendering a period of 5.4048 and 5.4100 hours with an amplitude of 0.58 and 0.27 magnitude, respectively (U=2/2).

=== Diameter and albedo ===
According to the surveys carried out by the Japanese Akari satellite and NASA's Wide-field Infrared Survey Explorer with its NEOWISE mission, Sekiguchi measures between 13.9 and 15.2 kilometers in diameter and its surface has an albedo between 0.192 and 0.3829. The Collaborative Asteroid Lightcurve Link assumes a standard albedo for carbonaceous asteroids of 0.057 and consequently calculates a larger diameter of 25.4 kilometers with an absolute magnitude of 11.7.
