= 3785 Kitami =

Asteroid

Discovery
- Discovered by: T. Seki
- Discovery site: Geisei Obs.
- Discovery date: 30 November 1986

Designations
- Named after: Kitami (Japanese city)
- Alternative designations: 1986 WM · 1934 TG; 1957 UM · 1979 OO_{2} 1980 UU
- Minor planet category: main-belt · Themis

Orbital characteristics
- Epoch 4 September 2017 (JD 2458000.5)
- Uncertainty parameter 0
- Observation arc: 37.95 yr (13,862 days)
- Aphelion: 3.7830 AU
- Perihelion: 2.6903 AU
- Semi-major axis: 3.2367 AU
- Eccentricity: 0.1688
- Orbital period (sidereal): 5.82 yr (2,127 days)
- Mean anomaly: 143.00°
- Mean motion: 0° 10^{m} 9.48^{s} / day
- Inclination: 1.9225°
- Longitude of ascending node: 151.03°
- Argument of perihelion: 237.05°

Physical characteristics
- Dimensions: 17.06 km (calculated); 19.761±0.269; 20.536±0.187 km
- Synodic rotation period: 3.7992±0.0004 h
- Geometric albedo: 0.0664±0.0133; 0.072±0.021; 0.08 (assumed)
- Spectral type: C
- Absolute magnitude (H): 12.0 · 12.11±0.18 · 12.2

3785 Kitami, provisional designation 1986 WM, is a carbonaceous Themistian asteroid from the outer region of the asteroid belt, approximately 19 kilometers in diameter. The asteroid was discovered by Japanese astronomer Tsutomu Seki at Geisei Observatory on 30 November 1986, and named after the city of Kitami, Japan.

== Orbit and classification ==
The C-type asteroid is a member of the Themis family, a dynamical family of outer-belt asteroids with nearly coplanar ecliptical orbits. It orbits the Sun in the outer main-belt at a distance of 2.7–3.8 AU once every 5 years and 10 months (2,127 days). Its orbit has an eccentricity of 0.17 and an inclination of 2° with respect to the ecliptic. The first observation was made at Simeiz Observatory in 1934, and the first used precovery was taken at the Australian Siding Spring Observatory in 1979, extending the asteroid's observation arc by 7 years prior to its official discovery date.

== Physical characteristics ==
=== Rotation period ===
In December 2009, a rotational lightcurve of Kitami was obtained from photometric observations by amateur astronomer René Roy at his at Blauvac Observatory, France. The lightcurve gave a rotation period of 3.7992±0.0004 hours with a brightness variation of 0.30 in magnitude (U=3-).

=== Diameter and albedo ===
Based on the survey carried out by NEOWISE mission of NASA's Wide-field Infrared Survey Explorer, Kitami measures 19.7 and 20.5 kilometers in diameter and its surface has an albedo of 0.066 and 0.072, respectively, while the Collaborative Asteroid Lightcurve Link assumes an albedo of 0.08 and calculates a diameter of 17.1 kilometers.

== Naming ==
This minor planet was named for the Japanese city of Kitami, where the Kitami Observatory is located. It is known for its many astrometric observations of small Solar System bodies by several amateur astronomers. Kitami is a "friendship city" of the discoverer's own city of Kochi (also see 2396 Kochi), and is located on the island on Hokkaido, after which the minor planet 3720 Hokkaido is named. The official naming citation was published by the Minor Planet Center on 27 August 1988 (M.P.C. 13482).
