= Kitami Observatory =

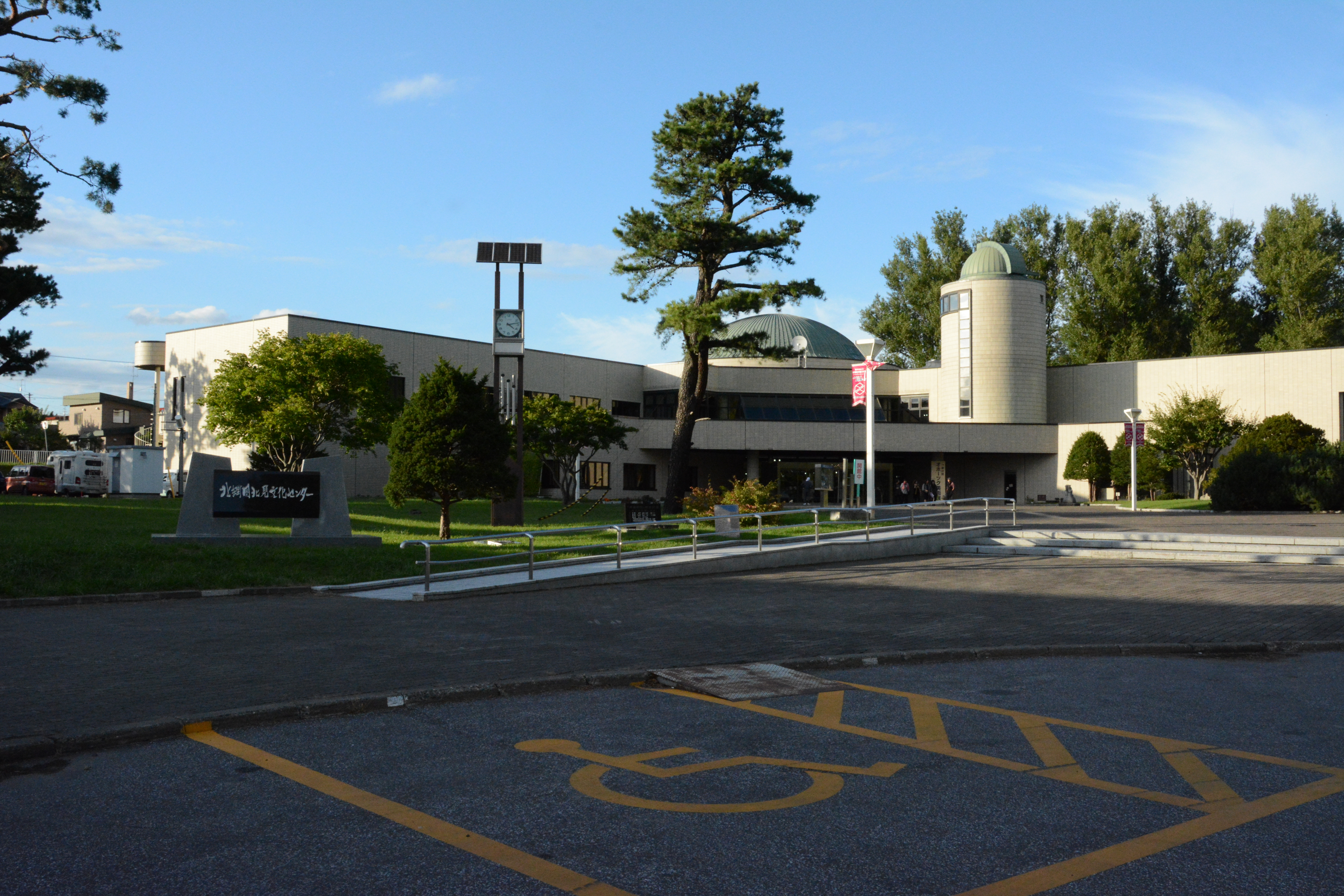
- Organization: Kitami Region Museum of Science History and Art
- Observatory code: 400
- Location: Kitami, Hokkaidō, Japan
- Coordinates: 43°49′06″N 143°54′13″E
- Established: 1987
- Website: business4.plala.or.jp/bunsen21/

Kitami Observatory is an astronomical observatory in the Kitami-Abashiri Region Cultural Centre in eastern Hokkaidō, Japan. Its observatory code is 400. It is 0.72344 Earth radii from the rotation axis and +0.68811 Earth radii from the equatorial plane, 143.7827 degrees east of Greenwich.

The amateur astronomers Atsushi Takahashi and Kazuro Watanabe discovered many asteroids here. As of 2012, 680 discoveries have been made at Kitami.

== See also ==
- Kin Endate
- List of observatories
  - List of asteroid-discovering observatories
- Tetsuya Fujii
