= 5160 =

5160 may refer to:

- a number in the 5000 range.

== Time ==
- A.D.5160, a year in the 6th millennium CE
- 5160 BCE, a year in the 6th millennium BC

== Astronomy ==
- 5160 Camoes, an asteroid located in the main asteroid belt

== Postal codes ==
- a postal code in Portugal, see List of postal codes in Portugal

== Electronics ==
- IBM PC/XT, the IBM model 5160 computer
- Inspiron 5160, a computer from Dell
- Nokia 5160, a cellphone
- Xeon 5160, a microprocessor, see List of Intel Xeon microprocessors
