= Serpe =

Serpe may refer to:

- Laurens Serpe, Italian footballer
- 9968 Serpe, main-belt asteroid
