= Meuse (disambiguation) =

Meuse is a river in Western Europe.

Meuse may also refer to:

- Meuse (department), a department in northeastern France
- David Meuse, American politician
- Jessica Meuse (born 1990), American singer-songwriter
- 3016 Meuse, a main-belt asteroid

== See also ==
- La Meuse
