= Courrière =

Village in the province of Namur, Wallonia, Belgium

Coordinates: 50.378°N 4.984°E

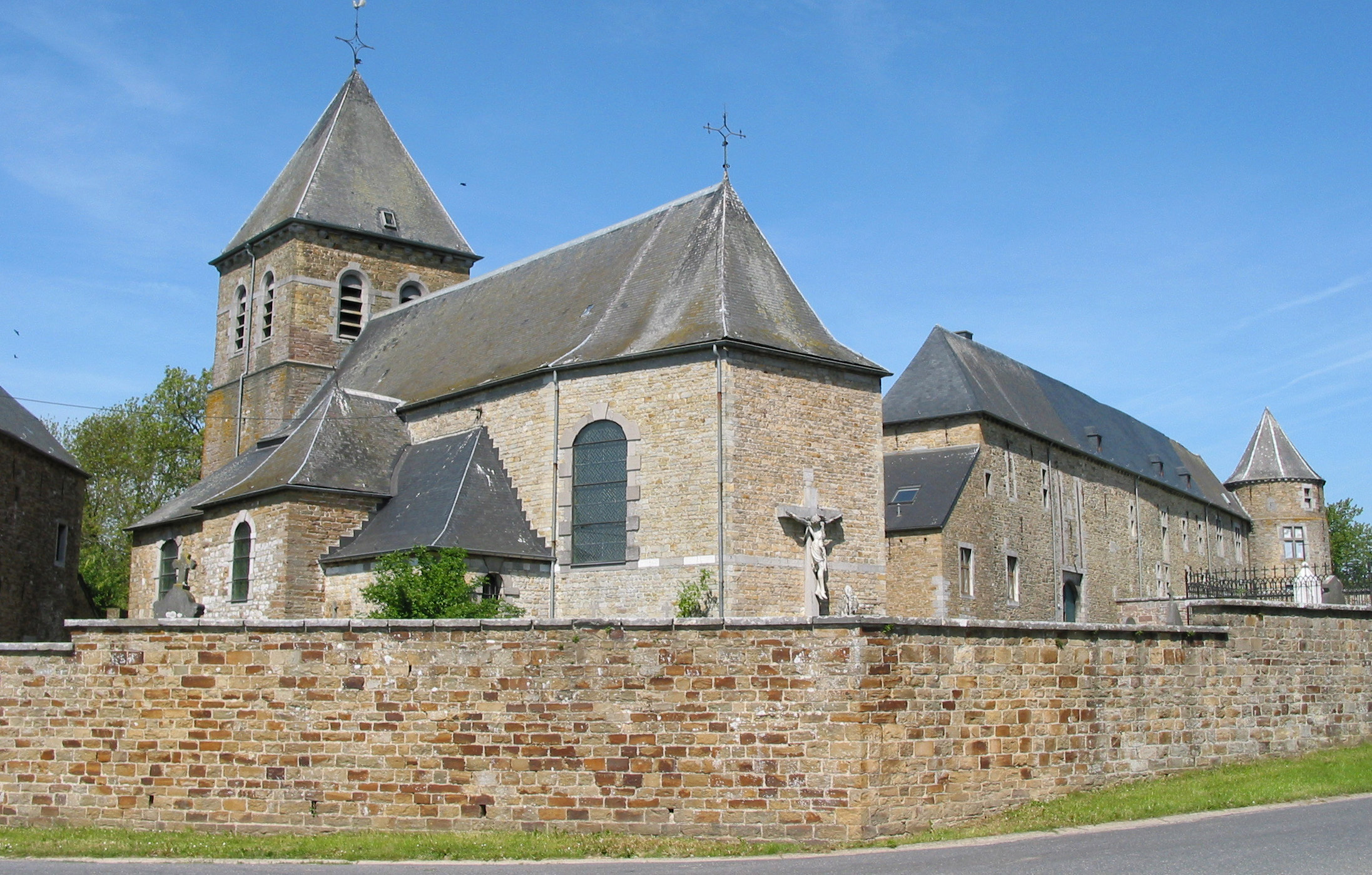
Petit-Courrière: St Quentin's church, next to the ferme-château

Courrière (French pronunciation: [kuʁjɛʁ]; Walloon: Côrire) is a village of Wallonia and a district of the municipality of Assesse, located in the province of Namur, Belgium.

Until 1977, it was an independent municipality.

Courrière is located at the junction of two major roads, the A4/E411 and the N4, and consists of the compact central village, Petit-Courrière, and a large hamlet, Trieu d'Avillon, which are separated from each other by the roads.

Courrière has been an independent parish from the 18th century. At the centre of the village stands the parish church of Saint Quentin, of Romanesque origin, and next to it a fortified farmhouse, or ferme-château, the so-called Château de Courrière, the present structure of which dates from the 17th century.

== Sources ==
- Assesse municipal website (in French and Dutch)
