= Crupet =

Village in Wallonia, Belgium

Coordinates: 50.348889°N 4.960000°E

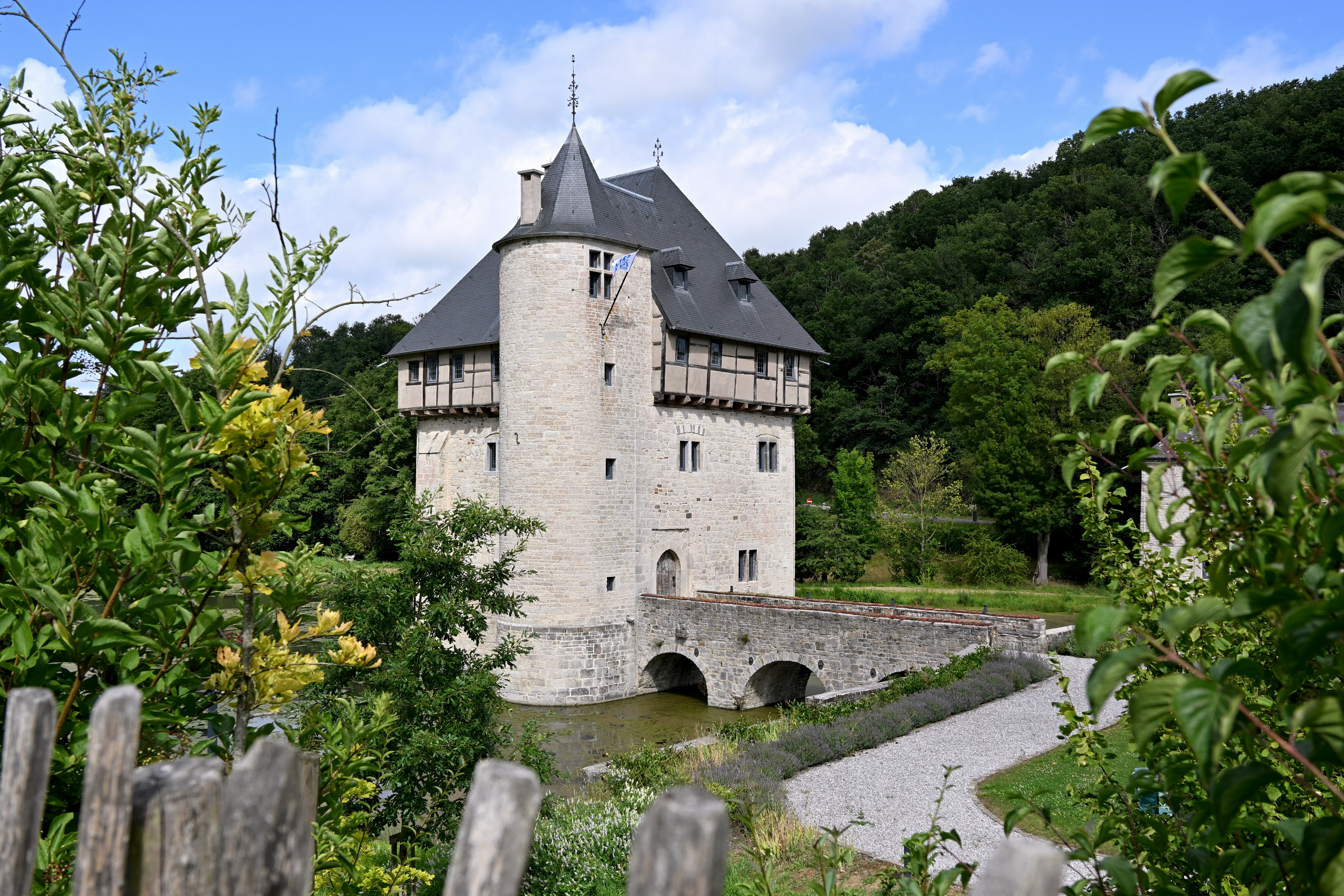
The 13th Century Castle of Crupet

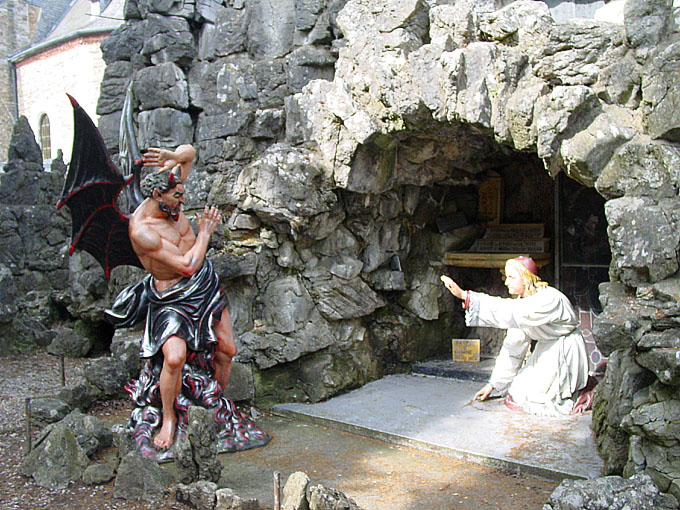
Statue of the devil in the Grotto in Crupet

Crupet (French pronunciation: [kʁypɛ]) is a village of Wallonia and a district of the municipality of Assesse, located in the province of Namur, Belgium.

Until 1977, it was itself a municipality. The postal code of Crupet is 5332.

It is a member of the organisation Les Plus Beaux Villages de Wallonie (French; in English: Most Beautiful Villages in Wallonia).

The centre of the village is dominated by the Grotto of St Anthony of Padua. The grotto was designed by the local curate Gerard and inaugurated on 12 July 1903. It features 22 religious-themed statues. Many of them depict scenes from the life of St Anthony of Padua. The Castle of Crupet, a medieval farm-chateau is situated below the village centre, and a little to the north, next to the river.
