= Giovanni de Sanctis =

Italian astronomer

Minor planets discovered: 42
see § List of discovered minor planets

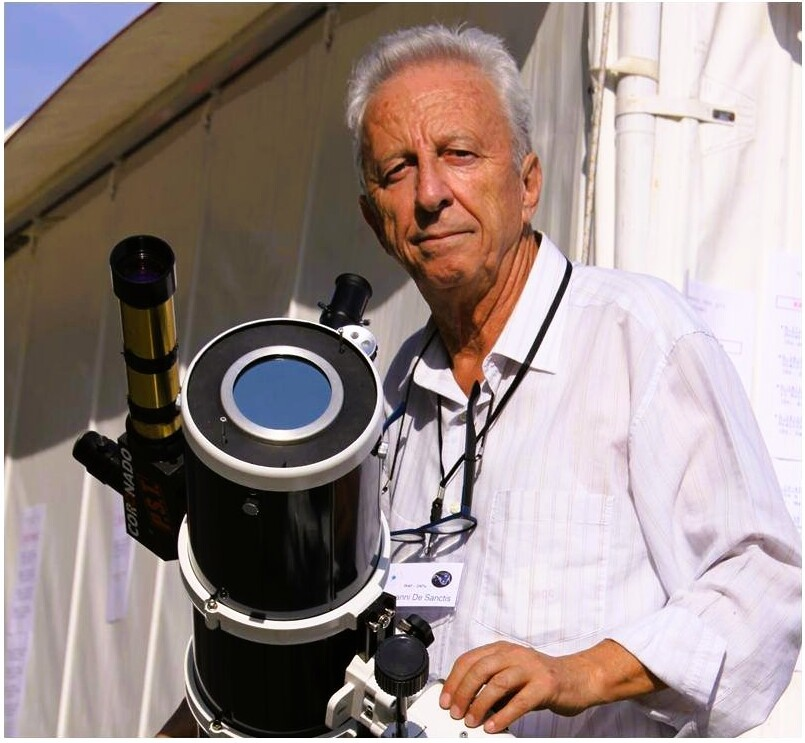
Giovanni de Sanctis

Giovanni de Sanctis (born 1949) is an Italian astronomer and discoverer of minor planets at the Osservatorio Astronomico di Torino (Astronomical Observatory of Turin) in Turin, Italy. His name is sometimes spelt DeSanctis, particularly in the Minor Planet Circulars. The Minor Planet Center credits him with the discovery of 42 numbered minor planets, most of which he discovered at ESO's La Silla site in northern Chile in the early 1980s.

The Vestian asteroid 3268 De Sanctis was named by Henri Debehogne in honor of his co-discoverer. Naming citation was published on 22 June 1986 (M.P.C. 10849).

== List of discovered minor planets ==
2461 Clavel^{[1]}	March 5, 1981
2765 Dinant^{[1]}	March 4, 1981
2788 Andenne^{[1]}	March 1, 1981
2958 Arpetito^{[1]}	February 28, 1981
3016 Meuse^{[1]}	March 1, 1981
3121 Tamines^{[1]}	March 2, 1981
3235 Melchior^{[1]}	March 6, 1981
3268 De Sanctis^{[1]}	February 26, 1981
3308 Ferreri^{[1]}	March 1, 1981
3610 Decampos^{[1]}	March 5, 1981
3740 Menge^{[1]}	March 1, 1981
4192 Breysacher^{[1]}	February 28, 1981
4931 Tomsk^{[1]}	February 11, 1983
4993 Cossard^{[1]}	April 11, 1983
5248 Scardia^{[1]}	April 6, 1983
5365 Fievez^{[1]}	March 7, 1981
5388 Mottola^{[1]}	March 5, 1981
6168 Isnello^{[1]}	March 5, 1981
6364 Casarini^{[1]}	March 2, 1981
6509 Giovannipratesi^{[1]}	February 12, 1983
7156 Flaviofusipecci^{[1]}	March 4, 1981
7233 Majella	March 7, 1986
7515 Marrucino	March 5, 1986
(7810) 1981 DE^{[1]}	February 26, 1981

(7916) 1981 EN^{[1]}	March 1, 1981
(7922) 1983 CO_{3}^{[1]}	February 12, 1983
(8453) 1981 EQ^{[1]}	March 1, 1981
8454 Micheleferrero^{[1]}	March 5, 1981
(8619) 1981 EH_{1}^{[1]}	March 6, 1981
(9278) 1981 EM_{1}^{[1]}	March 7, 1981
9523 Torino^{[1]}	March 5, 1981
9722 Levi-Montalcini^{[1]}	March 4, 1981
(11479) 1986 EP_{5}	March 6, 1986
(12987) 1981 EF_{2}^{[1]}	March 5, 1981
16368 Città di Alba^{[1]}	February 28, 1981
16372 Demichele^{[1]}	March 7, 1981
17357 Lucataliano^{[2]}	August 23, 1978
(17403) 1986 EL_{5}	March 6, 1986
26800 Gualtierotrucco^{[1]}	March 6, 1981
(30768) 1983 YK^{[3]}	December 29, 1983
52242 Michelemaoret^{[1]}	March 3, 1981
69245 Persiceto^{[1]}	March 1, 1981
^{1} with Henri Debehogne; ^{2} with Vincenzo Zappalà; ^{3} with Giuseppe Massone
