= 3268 De Sanctis =

Main-belt asteroid

Discovery
- Discovered by: H. Debehogne; G. de Sanctis
- Discovery site: La Silla Obs.
- Discovery date: 26 February 1981

Designations
- Named after: Giovanni de Sanctis (second discoverer)
- Alternative designations: 1981 DD · 1979 UQ_{4} 1979 WZ_{1} · 1990 WV_{15}
- Minor planet category: main-belt · (inner); Flora · Vesta

Orbital characteristics
- Epoch 23 March 2018 (JD 2458200.5)
- Uncertainty parameter 0
- Observation arc: 65.44 yr (23,902 d)
- Aphelion: 2.6447 AU
- Perihelion: 2.0490 AU
- Semi-major axis: 2.3469 AU
- Eccentricity: 0.1269
- Orbital period (sidereal): 3.60 yr (1,313 d)
- Mean anomaly: 329.92°
- Mean motion: 0° 16^{m} 26.76^{s} / day
- Inclination: 6.3522°
- Longitude of ascending node: 221.63°
- Argument of perihelion: 74.723°

Physical characteristics
- Mean diameter: 5.88 km (derived); 6.033±0.120 km
- Synodic rotation period: 17 h
- Geometric albedo: 0.2280±0.0056; 0.228±0.006; 0.24 (assumed)
- Spectral type: S (assumed)
- Absolute magnitude (H): 13.1 · 13.10±0.29; 13.32

3268 De Sanctis, provisional designation 1981 DD, is a Vestian asteroid from the inner regions of the asteroid belt, approximately 6 kilometers (3.7 miles) in diameter. It was discovered on 26 February 1981, by European astronomers Henri Debehogne and Giovanni de Sanctis at ESO's La Silla Observatory in northern Chile. The asteroid was named after the second discoverer. The assumed S-type asteroid has a rotation period of 17 hours.

== Orbit and classification ==
De Sanctis a member of the Vesta family (401) when applying the hierarchical clustering method to its proper orbital elements. Vestian asteroids have a composition akin to cumulate eucrites and are thought to have originated deep within 4 Vesta's crust, possibly from the Rheasilvia crater, a large impact crater on its southern hemisphere near the South pole, formed as a result of a subcatastrophic collision. Based on osculating Keplerian orbital elements, De Sanctis has also been classified as a member of the Flora family (402), a giant asteroid family and the largest family of stony asteroids in the main-belt.

The asteroid orbits the Sun in the inner main-belt at a distance of 2.0–2.6 AU once every 3 years and 7 months (1,313 days; semi-major axis of 2.35 AU). Its orbit has an eccentricity of 0.13 and an inclination of 6° with respect to the ecliptic.

The body's observation arc begins with a precovery taken at Palomar Observatory in December 1951, nearly three decades prior to its official discovery observation La Silla.

== Physical characteristics ==
De Sanctis is an assumed stony S-type asteroid.

=== Rotation period ===
A first rotational lightcurve of De Sanctis was obtained from photometric observations by Polish astronomer Wiesław Wiśniewski at the University of Arizona. Lightcurve analysis gave a rotation period of 17 hours with a brightness amplitude of 0.4 magnitude (U=2).

=== Diameter and albedo ===
According to the survey carried out by the NEOWISE mission of NASA's Wide-field Infrared Survey Explorer, De Sanctis measures 6.033 kilometers in diameter and its surface has an albedo of 0.228, while the Collaborative Asteroid Lightcurve Link assumes an albedo of 0.24 – derived from 8 Flora, the parent body of the Flora family – and derives a diameter of 5.88 kilometers based on an absolute magnitude of 13.32.

== Naming ==
This minor planet was named by the first discoverer after the second, Giovanni de Sanctis (born 1949), an Italian astronomer at the Observatory of Turin, who closely collaborated with Henri Debehogne at the European Southern Observatory in La Silla, Chile, during the early 1980s. The official naming citation was published by the Minor Planet Center on 22 June 1986 (M.P.C. 10849).
