= Crupet Castle =

Castle in Wallonia

Coordinates: 50.3499355680387459°N 4.95995119131765°E

- Wallonia, Belgium
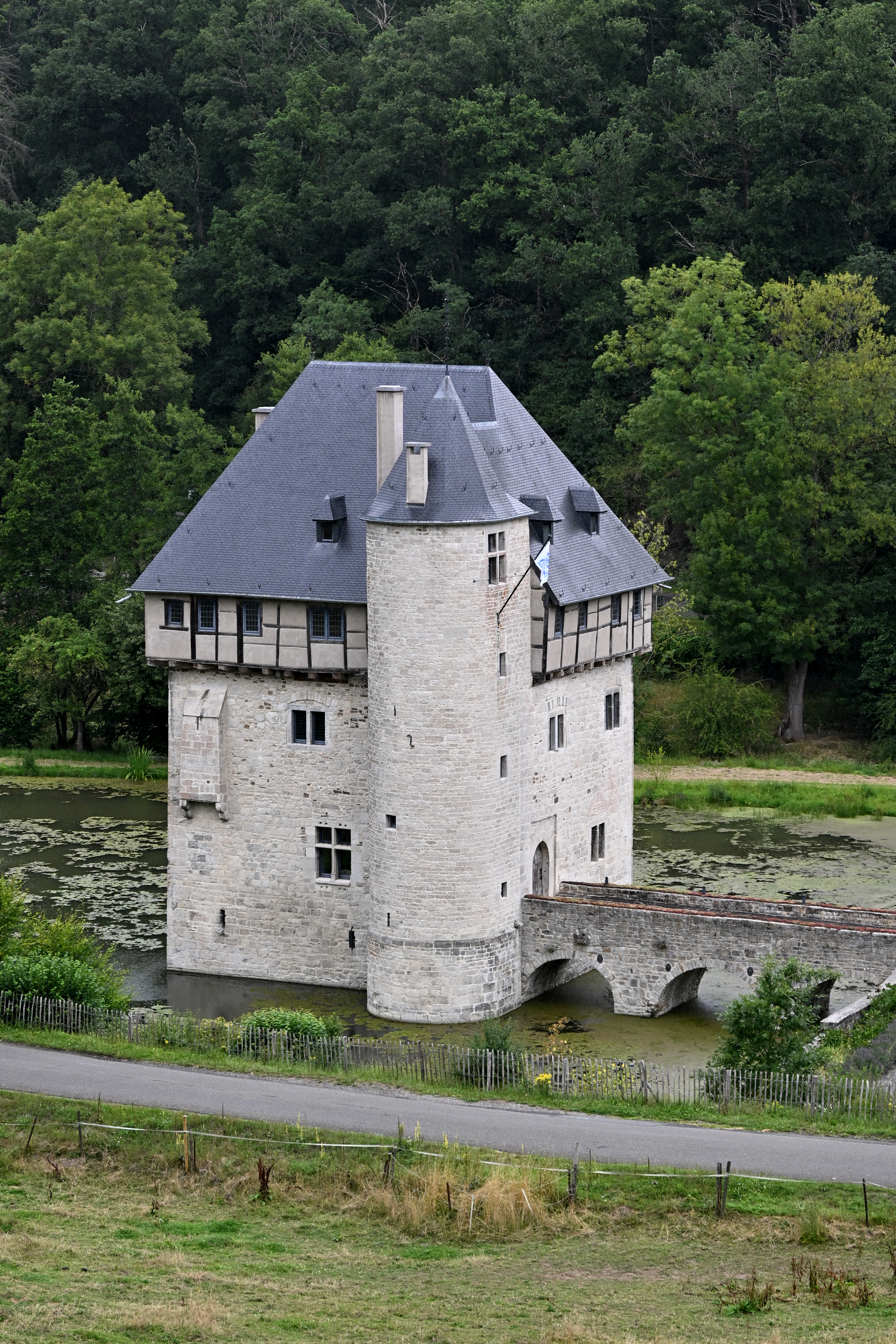

Site information
- Type: Castle

Crupet Castle or Carondelet Castle (French: Château de Crupet, also known as the Château des Carondelet), is a medieval moated donjon or fortified farmhouse (ferme-château) in the village of Crupet, Wallonia, since 1977 part of the municipality of Assesse, province of Namur, Belgium. It was built in the 11th or 12th century, and the lords of the castle later became vassals of Liège.

The castle was owned by the Crupet family until 1510, followed by the Carondelet family. The name and crest of the family is present in various places in the castle. In 1667, the castle was passed to the Mérode family (through marriage) where it remained until the French Revolution.

In 1925, the castle was restored by the architect Blomme and was owned by the Limbosch family until 2008.

== Sources ==
"Carondelet Castle". Castles.NL. Accessed 1 December 2019. https://www.castles.nl/carondelet-castle

"#128 Château de Crupet/Carondelet Castle". CarneyCastles. Accessed 20 October 2024. http://www.carneycastle.com/Crupet/index.htm

== See also ==
- List of castles in Belgium
- Crupet castle as Lego castle
