= 1372 Haremari =

Asteroid

Discovery
- Discovered by: K. Reinmuth
- Discovery site: Heidelberg Obs.
- Discovery date: 31 August 1935

Designations
- Named after: all female staff members of ARI
- Alternative designations: 1935 QK · 1928 DX; 1937 BD · 1944 QK; 1951 EW_{1} · 1953 OM; 1953 PZ
- Minor planet category: main-belt · (middle); Watsonia · Ceres trojan

Orbital characteristics
- Epoch 4 September 2017 (JD 2458000.5)
- Uncertainty parameter 0
- Observation arc: 89.18 yr (32,574 days)
- Aphelion: 3.1761 AU
- Perihelion: 2.3557 AU
- Semi-major axis: 2.7659 AU
- Eccentricity: 0.1483
- Orbital period (sidereal): 4.60 yr (1,680 days)
- Mean anomaly: 243.89°
- Mean motion: 0° 12^{m} 51.48^{s} / day
- Inclination: 16.450°
- Longitude of ascending node: 327.45°
- Argument of perihelion: 88.484°

Physical characteristics
- Dimensions: 21.96±0.72 km 23.90±0.53 km 24.18 km (derived); 26.491±0.292 km 27.724±0.158 km 31.17±8.52 km
- Synodic rotation period: 15.25±0.03 h
- Geometric albedo: 0.0303±0.0021; 0.039±0.012; 0.09±0.03; 0.1097 (derived); 0.126±0.006; 0.146±0.027
- Spectral type: SMASS = L
- Absolute magnitude (H): 11.00 · 11.1 · 12.2

1372 Haremari, provisional designation 1935 QK, is a rare-type Watsonian asteroid and a suspected trojan of Ceres from the central regions of the asteroid belt, approximately 26 kilometers in diameter. It was discovered on 31 August 1935, by astronomer Karl Reinmuth at the Heidelberg-Königstuhl State Observatory in southwest Germany. The asteroid was named for all female staff members of the Astronomical Calculation Institute.

== Orbit and classification ==
Haremari is a member of the very small Watsonia family (537), named after its parent body, namesake and largest member, 729 Watsonia.

It orbits the Sun in the central main-belt at a distance of 2.4–3.2 AU once every 4 years and 7 months (1,680 days). Its orbit has an eccentricity of 0.15 and an inclination of 16° with respect to the ecliptic. The body's observation arc begins with its first observation at Heidelberg in February 1928, more than seven years prior to its official discovery observation.

=== Trojan of Ceres ===
Long-term numerical integrations suggest that Haremari is a trojan of Ceres, staying a 1:1 orbital resonance with the only dwarf planet of the asteroid belt. It is thought that Haremari is currently transiting from a tadpole to a horseshoe orbit. Other suspected co-orbitals are the asteroids 855 Newcombia, 4608 Wodehouse, and 8877 Rentaro.

== Physical characteristics ==
In the SMASS classification, Haremari is a rare L-type asteroid with a moderate albedo. This type corresponds with the overall spectral type of the Watsonia family.

=== Rotation period ===
In November 2009, a rotational lightcurve of Haremari was obtained from photometric observations by Richard Durkee at the Shed of Science Observatory (H39). Lightcurve analysis gave a rotation period of 15.25 hours with a brightness amplitude of 0.12 magnitude (U=2).

=== Diameter and albedo ===
According to the surveys carried out by the Japanese Akari satellite and the NEOWISE mission of NASA's Wide-field Infrared Survey Explorer, Haremari measures between 21.96 and 31.17 kilometers in diameter and its surface has an albedo between 0.0303 and 0.146.

The Collaborative Asteroid Lightcurve Link derives an albedo of 0.1097 and a diameter of 24.18 kilometers based on an absolute magnitude of 11.1.

== Naming ==
This minor planet jointly honors all the female staff members of the Astronomical Calculation Institute (Heidelberg University) (German: Astronomisches Rechen-Institut), commonly known as ARI. In often published versions, "Haremari" is a composed name and means "the harem of A.R.I.".

=== Alternative version ===
According to Ingrid van Houten-Groeneveld, who worked as a young astronomer at Heidelberg, Reinmuth had often been asked by his colleges at ARI to name some of his discoveries after their female friends, as well as after popular actresses (and not just the female staff at ARI). He then compiled all these proposals to the name "Haremari". However, as Groeneveld recorded, "Reinmuth did not want to publish the original meaning and he, therefore, devised the interpretation of the first sentence in 1948".
