= 3016 Meuse =

Main-belt asteroid

Meuse
Discovery
- Discovered by: H. Debehogne
- Discovery site: La Silla
- Discovery date: March 1, 1981

Designations
- Named after: Meuse
- Alternative designations: 1981 EK

Orbital characteristics
- Epoch May 14, 2008
- Aphelion: 2.9561403
- Perihelion: 2.7115033
- Eccentricity: 0.0431638
- Orbital period (sidereal): 1742.4376150
- Mean anomaly: 314.18212
- Inclination: 2.89205
- Longitude of ascending node: 128.97056
- Argument of perihelion: 322.79331

Physical characteristics
- Absolute magnitude (H): 12.3

3016 Meuse (1981 EK) is an asteroid of the outer main-belt, approximately ten kilometers in diameter, which was discovered on March 1, 1981 by the Belgian astronomer Henri Debehogne and the Italian astronomer Giovanni de Sanctis at La Silla Observatory on La Silla in La Higuera, Chile.

== Naming & designation ==
3016 Meuse was named after the Meuse (Dutch/German: Maas), a river nearly 900 kilometers long. It flows through the French cities of Verdun, Domremy-la-Canne, and Sedan; the Belgian cities of Dinant (Asteroid: 2765 Dinant), Namur (3374 Namur), Huy, and Liège, as well as the cities of Maastricht, Venlo, and 's-Hertogenbosch in the Kingdom of the Netherlands.

== See also ==
- List of minor planets: 3001-4000
