= 17473 Freddiemercury =

Main-belt asteroid

Discovery
- Discovered by: H. Debehogne
- Discovery site: La Silla Obs.
- Discovery date: 21 March 1991

Designations
- Named after: Freddie Mercury (British musician)
- Alternative designations: 1991 FM_{3} · 1982 VC_{9} 1999 JE_{127}
- Minor planet category: main-belt · (inner); Massalia

Orbital characteristics
- Epoch 4 September 2017 (JD 2458000.5)
- Uncertainty parameter 0
- Observation arc: 34.48 yr (12,593 days)
- Aphelion: 2.7627 AU
- Perihelion: 2.0180 AU
- Semi-major axis: 2.3903 AU
- Eccentricity: 0.1558
- Orbital period (sidereal): 3.70 yr (1,350 days)
- Mean anomaly: 112.26°
- Mean motion: 0° 16^{m} 0.12^{s} / day
- Inclination: 0.9109°
- Longitude of ascending node: 0.8510°
- Argument of perihelion: 100.59°

Physical characteristics
- Dimensions: 3.435±0.374 km
- Geometric albedo: 0.313±0.064
- Absolute magnitude (H): 14.4

17473 Freddiemercury (provisional designation 1991 FM_{3}) is a stony Massalian asteroid from the inner regions asteroid belt, approximately 3.4 kilometers in diameter. The asteroid was discovered on 21 March 1991, by Belgian astronomer Henri Debehogne at ESO's La Silla Observatory in northern Chile, and later named in memory of Freddie Mercury.

== Classification and orbit ==
Freddiemercury is a member of the Massalia family (404), a large family of stony S-type asteroids with low inclinations in the inner main belt. It orbits the Sun at a distance of 2.0–2.8 AU once every 3 years and 8 months (1,350 days). Its orbit has an eccentricity of 0.16 and an inclination of 1° with respect to the ecliptic.

The body's observation arc begins 9 years prior to its official discovery observation, with its identification as 1982 VC_{9} at Crimea–Nauchnij in November 1982.

== Physical characteristics ==
According to the survey carried out by the NEOWISE mission of NASA's Wide-field Infrared Survey Explorer, Freddiemercury measures 3.4 kilometers in diameter and its surface has a high albedo of 0.313.

As of 2017, the asteroid's exact composition, as well as its rotation period and shape remain unknown.

== Naming ==
On 4 September 2016, one day before what would have been Freddie Mercury's 70th birthday, the International Astronomical Union and the Minor Planet Center named the asteroid after Mercury, as it was discovered the same year as Mercury's death, (M.P.C. 101215) and its provisional designation included his initials, FM. The approved naming was announced by Mercury's Queen bandmate Brian May at Montreux Casino to mark Mercury's 70th birthday.
