= 6117 Brevardastro =

Main-belt asteroid

Discovery
- Discovered by: H. Debehogne
- Discovery site: La Silla Obs.
- Discovery date: 12 February 1985

Designations
- Named after: Brevard Astronomical Society (Brevard County FL USA)
- Alternative designations: 1985 CZ_{1} · 1979 OO_{5}
- Minor planet category: main-belt · (inner)

Orbital characteristics
- Epoch 4 September 2017 (JD 2458000.5)
- Uncertainty parameter 0
- Observation arc: 62.66 yr (22,887 days)
- Aphelion: 2.4998 AU
- Perihelion: 2.1866 AU
- Semi-major axis: 2.3432 AU
- Eccentricity: 0.0668
- Orbital period (sidereal): 3.59 yr (1,310 days)
- Mean anomaly: 80.283°
- Mean motion: 0° 16^{m} 29.28^{s} / day
- Inclination: 6.1246°
- Longitude of ascending node: 305.56°
- Argument of perihelion: 144.36°

Physical characteristics
- Dimensions: 5.199±0.077 km
- Geometric albedo: 0.350±0.053
- Absolute magnitude (H): 13.3

6117 Brevardastro, provisional designation 1985 CZ_{1}, is a stony asteroid from the inner regions of the asteroid belt, approximately 5 kilometers in diameter.

The asteroid was discovered on 12 February 1985, by Belgian astronomer Henri Debehogne at ESO's La Silla site in northern Chile. It was later named for the American Brevard Astronomical Society.

== Orbit and classification ==
Brevardastro orbits the Sun in the inner main-belt at a distance of 2.2–2.5 AU once every 3 years and 7 months (1,310 days). Its orbit has an eccentricity of 0.07 and an inclination of 6° with respect to the ecliptic. A first precovery was taken at Palomar Observatory in 1954, extending the body's observation arc by 31 years prior to its official discovery observation at La Silla.

== Physical characteristics ==
According to the survey carried out by NASA's Wide-field Infrared Survey Explorer with its subsequent NEOWISE mission, Brevardastro measures 5.199 kilometers in diameter and its surface has a high albedo of 0.350, which is typical for stony E-type asteroids. As of 2017, the asteroid's rotation period and shape remain unknown.

== Naming ==
Brevardastro is a contrived name that honors the Brevard Astronomical Society, a very active amateur astronomy community in Brevard County, located on the east coast of Florida, United States, which is known as the "space coast", where the Kennedy Space Center and Cape Canaveral are located and many of the early American space flights originated.

This society was a winner of the NameExoWorlds contest organised by International Astronomical Union (IAU) in 2015, and was also awarded the naming right for this minor planet. The official naming citation was published by the Minor Planet Center on 12 February 2017 (M.P.C. 103029) and approved by the IAU's Committee on Small Body Nomenclature.
