= 4608 Wodehouse =

Main belt asteroid

Discovery
- Discovered by: H. Debehogne
- Discovery site: La Silla Obs.
- Discovery date: 19 January 1988

Designations
- Pronunciation: /ˈwʊdhaʊs/
- Named after: P. G. Wodehouse (English author)
- Alternative designations: 1988 BW_{3} · 1954 SG; 1978 GO_{4} · 1983 TD
- Minor planet category: main-belt · (inner) background · Ceres trojan

Orbital characteristics
- Epoch 4 September 2017 (JD 2458000.5)
- Uncertainty parameter 0
- Observation arc: 65.14 yr (23,794 days)
- Aphelion: 2.8779 AU
- Perihelion: 1.8460 AU
- Semi-major axis: 2.3619 AU
- Eccentricity: 0.2184
- Orbital period (sidereal): 3.63 yr (1,326 days)
- Mean anomaly: 103.56°
- Mean motion: 0° 16^{m} 17.4^{s} / day
- Inclination: 7.4477°
- Longitude of ascending node: 203.17°
- Argument of perihelion: 202.65°

Physical characteristics
- Dimensions: 7.629±0.069 km 7.912±0.161 km 8.18 km (calculated)
- Synodic rotation period: 13.944±0.002 h (Note: Pravec (2005) web: rotation period 13.944±0.002 hours with a brightness amplitude of 0.08 mag. Quality Code of 3. Summary figures for (4608) Wodehouse at LCDB and Ondrejov Asteroid Photometry Project, see data sheet.); 13.95±0.01 h
- Geometric albedo: 0.1958±0.0233; 0.20 (assumed); 0.210±0.018
- Spectral type: L · C (SDSS-MFB)
- Absolute magnitude (H): 12.8 · 12.9 · 13.24±0.20

4608 Wodehouse, provisional designation 1988 BW_{3}, is a background asteroid and suspected trojan of Ceres from the inner regions of the asteroid belt, approximately 8 kilometers in diameter. It was discovered on 19 January 1988, by Belgian astronomer Henri Debehogne at ESO's La Silla Observatory in northern Chile. The asteroid was named after English writer P. G. Wodehouse.

== Orbit and classification ==
Wodehouse is a non-family asteroid from the main belt's background population. It orbits the Sun in the inner main-belt at a distance of 1.8–2.9 AU once every 3 years and 8 months (1,326 days). Its orbit has an eccentricity of 0.22 and an inclination of 7° with respect to the ecliptic. The body's observation arc begins with a precovery taken at Palomar Observatory in January 1952, or 36 years prior to its official discovery observation at La Silla.

=== Trojan of Ceres ===
Long-term numerical integrations suggest, that Wodehouse is a trojan of Ceres, staying a 1:1 orbital resonance with the only dwarf planet of the asteroid belt. Other suspected co-orbitals are the asteroids 855 Newcombia, 1372 Haremari and 8877 Rentaro.

== Physical characteristics ==
Wodehouse is classified as a rare L-type asteroid by Pan-STARRS photometric survey. It has also been characterized as a common, carbonaceous C-type asteroid by SDSS-MFB (Masi Foglia Bus).

=== Rotation period ===
In December 2005, two rotational lightcurves of Wodehouse was obtained from photometric observations by Donald Pray and Petr Pravec in collaboration with several other observers. Lightcurve analysis gave a rotation period of 13.944 and 13.95 hours with a brightness amplitude of 0.08 and 0.10 magnitude, respectively (U=3/2). A low brightness variation typically indicates, that the body has a spherical rather than elongated shape.

=== Diameter and albedo ===
According to the survey carried out by the NEOWISE mission of NASA's Wide-field Infrared Survey Explorer, Wodehouse measures between 7.629 and 7.912 kilometers in diameter and its surface has an albedo between 0.1958 and 0.210.

The Collaborative Asteroid Lightcurve Link assumes a standard albedo for stony asteroids of 0.20 and calculates a diameter of 8.18 kilometers based on an absolute magnitude of 12.8.

== Naming ==
This minor planet was named after English writer and humorist P. G. Wodehouse (Sir Pelham Grenville Wodehouse; 1881–1975). He created several fictional characters who became familiar to the public over the years, including the jolly gentleman of leisure Bertie Wooster and his sagacious valet, Jeeves. The body's name was suggested by Belgian astronomer Jean Meeus.

The official naming citation was published by the Minor Planet Center on 13 April 2006 (M.P.C. 56611).
