= Assesse =

Municipality in Wallonia, Belgium

Assesse Assesse (Walloon)
- Municipality
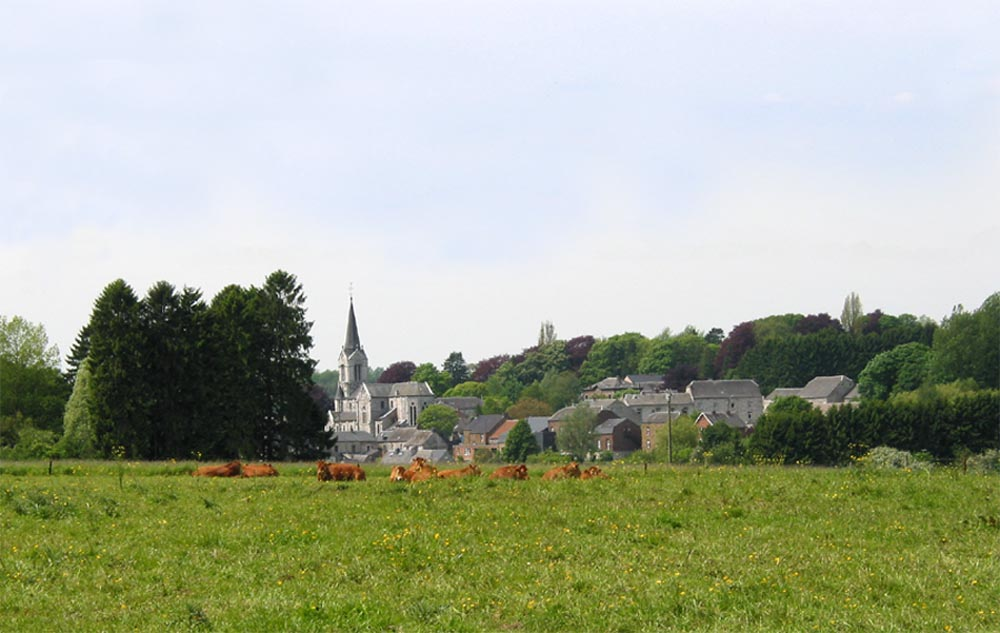

- Flag Coat of arms

- Location of Assesse in Namur Province
- Interactive map of Assesse
- Location in Belgium
- Coordinates: 50°22′N 05°01′E
- Country: Belgium
- Community: French Community
- Region: Wallonia
- Province: Namur
- Arrondissement: Namur

Government
  - Mayor: Jean-Luc MOSSERAY
  - Governing parties: ACOR+, Ecolo

Area
  - Total: 78.53 km^{2} (30.32 sq mi)

Population (2018-01-01)
  - Total: 6,964
  - Density: 88.68/km^{2} (229.7/sq mi)
- Postal codes: 5330, 5332-5334, 5336
- NIS code: 92006
- Area codes: 083
- Website: www.assesse.be

Assesse (French pronunciation: [a.sɛs]) is a municipality of Wallonia located in the province of Namur, Belgium.

On 1 January 2006, Assesse had a total population of 6,252. The total area is 78.16 km^{2} which gives a population density of 80 inhabitants per km^{2}.

The municipality consists of the following districts: Assesse, Courrière, Crupet, Florée, Maillen, Sart-Bernard, and Sorinne-la-Longue.

The village of Crupet is noted for its grotto dedicated to Saint Anthony of Padua, the Crupet Castle, a moated medieval donjon, and its windmills.

== Notable people ==
- Georges Gilkinet (1971), deputy prime minister.

== See also ==
- List of protected heritage sites in Assesse
