= List of protected heritage sites in Assesse =

This table shows an overview of the protected heritage sites in the Walloon town Assesse. This list is part of Belgium's national heritage.

Object	Year/architect	Town/section	Address	Coordinates	Number^{?}	Image
Chapel of St. Gilles ^{(nl)} ^{(fr)}		Assesse	Mianoye	50.344381°N 5.021595°E	92006-CLT-0001-01 Info	
Castle Courrière ^{(nl)} ^{(fr)}		Assesse		50.378395°N 4.983828°E	92006-CLT-0002-01 Info	
Castle Courrière ^{(nl)} ^{(fr)}		Assesse	Courrière	50.378949°N 4.979294°E	92006-CLT-0003-01 Info	
Church of St. Martin ^{(nl)} ^{(fr)}		Assesse	Crupet	50.348326°N 4.960969°E	92006-CLT-0004-01 Info	Kerk Saint-Martin
Church of St. Martin ^{(nl)} ^{(fr)}		Assesse	Crupet	50.348312°N 4.960242°E	92006-CLT-0005-01 Info	Ensemble van de kerk Saint-Martin, de oude begraafplaats naast de pastorie, het kerkplein en de oude lindeboom die hier groeit
Crupet dungeon and terrain ^{(nl)} ^{(fr)}		Assesse		50.350293°N 4.960618°E	92006-CLT-0006-01 Info	De donjon van Crupet en zijn bijgebouwen en het ensemble van de donjon, zijn bijgebouwen en het omliggende terrein
Teo elm trees across from the church of St. Geneviève ^{(nl)} ^{(fr)}		Assesse	Florée	50.372320°N 5.069829°E	92006-CLT-0007-01 Info	Twee lindes tegenover de kerk Sainte-Geneviève
Stations of the Cross ^{(nl)} ^{(fr)}		Assesse	Florée	50.375924°N 5.069221°E	92006-CLT-0008-01 Info	
Church of St. Martin ^{(nl)} ^{(fr)}		Assesse	Yvoy-sous-Maillen	50.363514°N 4.941563°E	92006-CLT-0009-01 Info	
Arche farmhouse ^{(nl)} ^{(fr)}		Assesse	Maillen	50.374605°N 4.944987°E	92006-CLT-0010-01 Info	
Castle Ronchine ^{(nl)} ^{(fr)}		Assesse		50.355803°N 4.932316°E	92006-CLT-0011-01 Info	
Church of St. Quentin ^{(nl)} ^{(fr)}		Assesse	Courrière	50.378014°N 4.984385°E	92006-CLT-0012-01 Info	
Wagnée arch ^{(nl)} ^{(fr)}		Assesse		50.383676°N 5.070633°E	92006-CLT-0013-01 Info	
Church of St. Geneviève ^{(nl)} ^{(fr)}		Assesse		50.372479°N 5.070041°E	92006-CLT-0015-01 Info	Gevels, daken en stucwerk interieur van de kerk van Saint-Geneviève en de ommuring van de begraafplaats, de boerderij van de monniken met inbegrip van de omringende muur van het terrein, maar uitgezonderd de recente schuur, en de pastorie, met uitzondering van de aanbouw, die en de oprichting van een beschermingszone rond het geheel van het ensemble van de kerk Sainte-Geneviève, boerderij van Moines, de pastorie en de centrale kern van het dorp Floree
Roches woods ^{(nl)} ^{(fr)}		Assesse		50.339257°N 4.905876°E	92006-CLT-0016-01 Info	
Grotto of "trou d'Haquin" ^{(nl)} ^{(fr)}		Assesse		50.368667°N 4.904320°E	92006-CLT-0017-01 Info	
Crupet cellar ^{(nl)} ^{(fr)}		Assesse		50.349992°N 4.959885°E	92006-PEX-0001-01 Info	De donjon van Crupet

== See also ==
- List of protected heritage sites in Namur (province)
- Assesse
