= La Meuse =

La Meuse may refer to:

- Ateliers de construction de La Meuse (locomotive builder and engineering company)
- La Meuse (newspaper), a French-language regional newspaper published in Liège, Belgium

== See also ==
- Meuse (disambiguation)
