= (11474) 1982 SM2 =

Main-belt asteroid

(11474) 1982 SM_{2}
Discovery
- Discovered by: H. Debehogne
- Discovery site: La Silla Obs.
- Discovery date: 18 September 1982

Designations
- Alternative designations: 1995 KD
- Minor planet category: main-belt · Baptistina

Orbital characteristics
- Epoch 4 September 2017 (JD 2458000.5)
- Uncertainty parameter 0
- Observation arc: 32.59 yr (11,905 days)
- Aphelion: 2.7224 AU
- Perihelion: 1.8294 AU
- Semi-major axis: 2.2759 AU
- Eccentricity: 0.1962
- Orbital period (sidereal): 3.43 yr (1,254 days)
- Mean anomaly: 76.029°
- Mean motion: 0° 17^{m} 13.56^{s} / day
- Inclination: 5.4069°
- Longitude of ascending node: 348.59°
- Argument of perihelion: 355.61°

Physical characteristics
- Dimensions: 5.71 km (calculated)
- Synodic rotation period: 1917.2214±2716 h
- Geometric albedo: 0.057 (assumed)
- Spectral type: C
- Absolute magnitude (H): 14.493±0.001 (R) · 14.7 · 14.94 · 14.94±0.61

(11474) 1982 SM_{2} is a carbonaceous Baptistina asteroid and potentially slow rotator from the inner regions of the asteroid belt, approximately 6 kilometers in diameter. It was discovered on 18 September 1982, by Belgian astronomer Henri Debehogne at ESO' La Silla Observatory in northern Chile.

== Orbit and classification ==
The C-type asteroid belongs to the small Baptistina family. It orbits the Sun at a distance of 1.8–2.7 AU once every 3 years and 5 months (1,254 days). Its orbit has an eccentricity of 0.20 and an inclination of 5° with respect to the ecliptic. As no precoveries were taken, and no prior identifications were made, the asteroid's observation arc begins with its official discovery observation.

== Physical characteristics ==
In September 2013, a rotational lightcurve of this asteroid was obtained from photometric observations in the R-band at the Palomar Transient Factory in California. It gave an exceptionally long rotation period of 1917 hours with a brightness amplitude of 0.04 magnitude (U=1). However, the fragmentary light-curve has received a low quality rating by the Collaborative Asteroid Lightcurve Link (CALL) which means that the result could be completely wrong (also see potentially slow rotator).

CALL assumes a standard albedo for carbonaceous asteroids of 0.057 and calculates a diameter of 5.71 kilometers, based on an absolute magnitude of 14.49.

== Numbering and naming ==
This minor planet was numbered by the Minor Planet Center on 28 September 1999. As of 2018, it has not been named.
