= Henri Debehogne =

Belgian astronomer

Minor planets discovered: 741
see § List of discovered minor planets

Henri Debehogne (30 December 1928 – 9 December 2007) was a Belgian astronomer and a prolific discoverer of minor planets.

== Biography ==
He was born at Maillen. Debehogne worked at the Royal Observatory of Belgium (French: Observatoire Royal de Belgique) in Uccle, and specialized in astrometry of comets and minor planets.

He is credited by the Minor Planet Center with the discovery of over 700 numbered minor planets, including the Trojan asteroids 6090 Aulis and 65210 Stichius (the latter with Eric Walter Elst) and hundreds of asteroids of the main-belt.

He died on 9 December 2007, at the age of 78 in Uccle. The asteroid 2359 Debehogne was named in his honor.

== List of discovered minor planets ==
List of minor planets discovered by Henri Debehogne

Name	Discovery Date	Listing
2364 Seillier	14 April 1978	list
2461 Clavel	5 March 1981	list^{[A]}
2543 Machado	1 June 1980	list
2590 Mourão	22 May 1980	list
2673 Lossignol	22 May 1980	list
2707 Ueferji	28 August 1981	list
2765 Dinant	4 March 1981	list^{[A]}
2788 Andenne	1 March 1981	list^{[A]}
2795 Lepage	16 December 1979	list^{[B]}
2814 Vieira	18 March 1982	list
2852 Declercq	23 August 1981	list
2926 Caldeira	22 May 1980	list
2958 Arpetito	28 February 1981	list^{[A]}
3002 Delasalle	20 March 1982	list
3016 Meuse	1 March 1981	list^{[A]}
3121 Tamines	2 March 1981	list^{[A]}
3138 Ciney	22 May 1980	list
3175 Netto	16 December 1979	list^{[B]}
3235 Melchior	6 March 1981	list^{[A]}
3268 De Sanctis	26 February 1981	list^{[A]}
3274 Maillen	23 August 1981	list
3308 Ferreri	1 March 1981	list^{[A]}
3365 Recogne	13 February 1985	list
3374 Namur	22 May 1980	list
3389 Sinzot	25 February 1984	list
3390 Demanet	2 March 1984	list
3411 Debetencourt	2 June 1980	list
3450 Dommanget	31 August 1983	list
3456 Etiennemarey	5 September 1985	list
3457 Arnenordheim	5 September 1985	list
3458 Boduognat	7 September 1985	list
3465 Trevires	20 September 1984	list
3519 Ambiorix	23 February 1984	list
3610 Decampos	5 March 1981	list^{[A]}
3646 Aduatiques	11 September 1985	list
3679 Condruses	24 February 1984	list
3705 Hotellasilla	4 March 1984	list
3740 Menge	1 March 1981	list^{[A]}
3788 Steyaert	29 August 1986	list
3820 Sauval	25 February 1984	list
3821 Sonet	6 September 1985	list
3848 Analucia	21 March 1982	list
3852 Glennford	24 February 1987	list
3865 Lindbloom	13 January 1988	list
3866 Langley	20 January 1988	list
3916 Maeva	24 August 1981	list
3919 Maryanning	23 February 1984	list
3984 Chacos	21 September 1984	list
4016 Sambre	15 December 1979	list^{[B]}
4030 Archenhold	2 March 1984	list
4036 Whitehouse	21 February 1987	list
4099 Wiggins	13 January 1988	list
4120 Denoyelle	14 September 1985	list
4123 Tarsila	27 August 1986	list
4172 Rochefort	20 March 1982	list
4191 Assesse	22 May 1980	list
4192 Breysacher	28 February 1981	list^{[A]}
4199 Andreev	1 September 1983	list
4202 Minitti	12 February 1985	list
4206 Verulamium	25 August 1986	list
4210 Isobelthompson	21 February 1987	list
4211 Rosniblett	12 September 1987	list
4216 Neunkirchen	14 January 1988	list
4218 Demottoni	16 January 1988	list
4252 Godwin	11 September 1985	list
4313 Bouchet	21 April 1979	list
4328 Valina	18 September 1982	list
4334 Foo	2 September 1983	list
4443 Paulet	10 September 1985	list
4474 Proust	24 August 1981	list
4479 Charlieparker	10 February 1985	list
4535 Adamcarolla	28 August 1986	list
4536 Drewpinsky	22 February 1987	list
4545 Primolevi	28 September 1989	list
4571 Grumiaux	8 September 1985	list
4599 Rowan	5 September 1985	list
4600 Meadows	10 September 1985	list
4608 Wodehouse	19 January 1988	list
4627 Pinomogavero	5 September 1985	list
4633 Marinbica	14 January 1988	list
4668 Rayjay	21 February 1987	list
4684 Bendjoya	10 April 1978	list
4695 Mediolanum	7 September 1985	list
4697 Novara	26 August 1986	list
4744 Rovereto	2 September 1988	list
4782 Gembloux	14 October 1980	list^{[C]}
4784 Samcarin	28 February 1984	list
4793 Slessor	1 September 1988	list
4800 Veveri	9 October 1989	list
4817 Gliba	27 February 1984	list
4830 Thomascooley	1 September 1988	list
4843 Mégantic	28 February 1990	list
4864 Nimoy	2 September 1988	list
4931 Tomsk	11 February 1983	list^{[A]}
4933 Tylerlinder	2 March 1984	list
4937 Lintott	1 February 1986	list
4938 Papadopoulos	5 February 1986	list
4939 Scovil	27 August 1986	list
4942 Munroe	24 February 1987	list
4993 Cossard	11 April 1983	list^{[A]}
4994 Kisala	1 September 1983	list
5056 Rahua	9 September 1986	list
5057 Weeks	22 February 1987	list
5098 Tomsolomon	14 February 1985	list
5099 Iainbanks	16 February 1985	list
5107 Laurenbacall	24 February 1987	list
5109 Robertmiller	13 September 1987	list
5160 Camoes	23 December 1979	list^{[B]}
5229 Irurita	23 February 1987	list
5248 Scardia	6 April 1983	list^{[A]}
5313 Nunes	18 September 1982	list
5322 Ghaffari	26 August 1986	list
5326 Vittoriosacco	8 September 1988	list
5346 Benedetti	24 August 1981	list
5365 Fievez	7 March 1981	list^{[A]}
5368 Vitagliano	21 September 1984	list
5388 Mottola	5 March 1981	list^{[A]}
(5396) 1988 SH_{1}	20 September 1988	list
(5428) 1987 RA_{1}	13 September 1987	list
(5437) 1990 DU_{3}	26 February 1990	list
5459 Saraburger	26 August 1981	list
(5462) 1984 SX_{5}	21 September 1984	list
(5469) 1988 BK_{4}	21 January 1988	list
(5503) 1985 CE_{2}	13 February 1985	list
5506 Artiglio	24 September 1987	list
(5510) 1988 RF_{7}	2 September 1988	list
5546 Salavat	18 December 1979	list
5575 Ryanpark	4 September 1985	list
(5582) 1989 CU_{8}	13 February 1989	list
(5586) 1990 RE_{6}	9 September 1990	list
5589 De Meis	23 September 1990	list
(5669) 1985 CC_{2}	12 February 1985	list
5705 Ericsterken	21 October 1965	list
(5713) 1982 FF_{3}	21 March 1982	list
(5721) 1984 SO_{5}	18 September 1984	list
5727 Pierobenvenuti	19 January 1988	list
5728 Umbertobenvenuti	20 January 1988	list
(5755) 1992 OP_{7}	20 July 1992	list^{[D]}
(5764) 1985 CS_{1}	10 February 1985	list
5766 Carmelofalco	29 August 1986	list
5770 Aricam	12 September 1987	list
5842 Cancelli	8 February 1986	list
(5876) 1990 DM_{2}	24 February 1990	list
(5918) 1991 NV_{3}	6 July 1991	list
(5949) 1985 RL_{3}	6 September 1985	list
(6033) 1984 SQ_{4}	24 September 1984	list
(6040) 1990 DK_{3}	24 February 1990	list
(6061) 1981 SQ_{2}	20 September 1981	list
6090 Aulis	27 February 1989	list
6117 Brevardastro	12 February 1985	list
6118 Mayuboshi	31 August 1986	list
6168 Isnello	5 March 1981	list^{[A]}
6177 Fécamp	12 February 1986	list
6187 Kagura	2 September 1988	list
6288 Fouts	2 March 1984	list
(6290) 1985 CA_{2}	12 February 1985	list
(6292) 1986 QQ_{2}	28 August 1986	list
6313 Tsurutani	14 September 1990	list
6364 Casarini	5 March 1981	list^{[A]}
(6367) 1982 FY_{2}	18 March 1982	list
6368 Richardmenendez	1 September 1983	list
(6378) 1987 SE_{13}	27 September 1987	list
6438 Suárez	18 January 1988	list
(6477) 1988 AE_{5}	14 January 1988	list
(6492) 1991 OH_{1}	18 July 1991	list
6509 Giovannipratesi	12 February 1983	list^{[A]}
6541 Yuan	26 February 1984	list
(6548) 1988 BO_{4}	22 January 1988	list
(6588) 1985 RC_{4}	10 September 1985	list
6639 Marchis	25 September 1989	list
6691 Trussoni	26 February 1984	list
(6693) 1986 CC_{2}	12 February 1986	list
(6702) 1988 BP_{3}	18 January 1988	list
6705 Rinaketty	2 September 1988	list
(6759) 1980 KD	21 May 1980	list
(6760) 1980 KM	22 May 1980	list
(6772) 1988 BG_{4}	20 January 1988	list
(6850) 1981 QT_{3}	28 August 1981	list
6851 Chianti	1 September 1981	list
6852 Nannibignami	14 February 1985	list
6853 Silvanomassaglia	12 February 1986	list
(6861) 1991 FA_{3}	20 March 1991	list
6893 Sanderson	2 September 1983	list
(6895) 1987 DG_{6}	23 February 1987	list
(6896) 1987 RE_{1}	13 September 1987	list
(6946) 1980 RX_{1}	15 September 1980	list^{[C]}
(6951) 1985 DW_{1}	16 February 1985	list
7013 Trachet	1 September 1988	list
(7050) 1982 FE_{3}	20 March 1982	list
(7090) 1992 HY_{4}	23 April 1992	list
(7155) 1979 YN	23 December 1979	list^{[B]}
7156 Flaviofusipecci	4 March 1981	list^{[A]}
(7168) 1986 QE_{2}	28 August 1986	list
7174 Semois	18 September 1988	list
(7227) 1984 SH_{6}	22 September 1984	list
(7234) 1986 QV_{3}	29 August 1986	list
(7281) 1988 RX_{4}	2 September 1988	list
(7283) 1989 TX_{15}	4 October 1989	list
7388 Marcomorelli	23 March 1982	list
(7397) 1986 QS	26 August 1986	list
(7404) 1988 AA_{5}	13 January 1988	list
(7458) 1984 DE_{1}	28 February 1984	list
(7513) 1985 RU_{2}	5 September 1985	list
7556 Perinaldo	18 March 1982	list
(7557) 1982 FK_{3}	21 March 1982	list
(7566) 1988 SP	18 September 1988	list
(7637) 1984 DN	23 February 1984	list
(7744) 1986 QA_{1}	26 August 1986	list
(7745) 1987 DB_{6}	22 February 1987	list
(7746) 1987 RC_{1}	13 September 1987	list
(7810) 1981 DE	26 February 1981	list^{[A]}
(7814) 1986 CF_{2}	13 February 1986	list
7865 Françoisgros	21 March 1982	list
(7880) 1992 OM_{7}	19 July 1992	list^{[D]}
(7884) 1993 HH_{7}	24 April 1993	list
7916 Gigiproietti	1 March 1981	list^{[A]}
(7922) 1983 CO_{3}	12 February 1983	list^{[A]}
(7926) 1986 RD_{5}	3 September 1986	list
(7929) 1987 SK_{12}	16 September 1987	list
7935 Beppefenoglio	1 March 1990	list
(7942) 1991 OK_{1}	18 July 1991	list
(7997) 1985 CN_{1}	13 February 1985	list
8000 Isaac Newton	5 September 1986	list
(8004) 1987 RX	12 September 1987	list
(8007) 1988 RU_{6}	8 September 1988	list
8025 Forrestpeterson	22 March 1991	list
8039 Grandprism	15 September 1993	list^{[E]}
8076 Foscarini	15 September 1985	list
(8085) 1989 CD_{8}	7 February 1989	list
8148 Golding	15 February 1985	list
(8263) 1986 QT	26 August 1986	list
(8264) 1986 QA_{3}	29 August 1986	list
(8265) 1986 RB_{5}	1 September 1986	list
8289 An-Eefje	3 May 1992	list
8298 Loubna	22 September 1993	list^{[E]}
8328 Uyttenhove	23 August 1981	list
8329 Speckman	22 March 1982	list
8330 Fitzroy	28 March 1982	list
8335 Sarton	28 February 1984	list
(8337) 1984 SF_{6}	22 September 1984	list
(8341) 1986 QQ	26 August 1986	list
(8342) 1986 QN_{3}	29 August 1986	list
(8346) 1987 DW_{6}	26 February 1987	list
(8376) 1992 OZ_{9}	30 July 1992	list^{[D]}
(8453) 1981 EQ	1 March 1981	list^{[A]}
8454 Micheleferrero	5 March 1981	list^{[A]}
(8473) 1984 SS_{5}	21 September 1984	list
(8476) 1986 QT_{2}	28 August 1986	list
(8478) 1987 DO_{6}	23 February 1987	list
(8480) 1987 RD_{1}	13 September 1987	list
(8497) 1990 RE_{7}	13 September 1990	list
(8499) 1990 SC_{13}	22 September 1990	list
(8509) 1991 FV_{2}	20 March 1991	list
(8619) 1981 EH_{1}	6 March 1981	list^{[A]}
(8637) 1986 CS_{1}	6 February 1986	list
(8638) 1986 QY	26 August 1986	list
(8670) 1991 OM_{1}	18 July 1991	list
8815 Deanregas	23 February 1984	list
8818 Hermannbondi	5 September 1985	list
8819 Chrisbondi	14 September 1985	list
(8821) 1987 DP_{6}	23 February 1987	list
(8828) 1988 RC_{7}	10 September 1988	list
(8841) 1990 EA_{7}	2 March 1990	list
(8846) 1990 RK_{7}	13 September 1990	list
(8989) 1979 XJ	15 December 1979	list^{[B]}
9002 Gabrynowicz	23 August 1981	list
9024 Gunnargraps	5 September 1988	list
(9042) 1991 EN_{2}	11 March 1991	list
(9043) 1991 EJ_{4}	12 March 1991	list
(9057) 1992 HA_{5}	24 April 1992	list
(9163) 1987 RB_{1}	13 September 1987	list
9173 Viola Castello	4 October 1989	list
(9182) 1991 NB_{4}	8 July 1991	list
(9195) 1992 OF_{9}	26 July 1992	list^{[D]}
(9278) 1981 EM_{1}	7 March 1981	list^{[A]}
9289 Balau	26 August 1981	list
(9301) 1985 RB_{4}	10 September 1985	list
(9303) 1986 QH_{3}	29 August 1986	list
(9304) 1986 RA_{5}	1 September 1986	list
(9310) 1987 SV_{12}	18 September 1987	list
(9317) 1988 RO_{4}	1 September 1988	list
(9318) 1988 RG_{9}	6 September 1988	list
(9328) 1990 DL_{3}	24 February 1990	list
(9330) 1990 EF_{7}	3 March 1990	list
(9337) 1991 FO_{1}	17 March 1991	list
(9338) 1991 FL_{4}	25 March 1991	list
9381 Lyon	15 September 1993	list^{[E]}
9523 Torino	5 March 1981	list^{[A]}
(9546) 1984 SD_{6}	22 September 1984	list
(9557) 1986 QL_{2}	28 August 1986	list
(9558) 1986 QB_{3}	29 August 1986	list
(9559) 1987 DH_{6}	23 February 1987	list
(9568) 1988 AX_{4}	13 January 1988	list
(9570) 1988 RQ_{5}	2 September 1988	list
(9571) 1988 RR_{5}	2 September 1988	list
(9572) 1988 RS_{6}	8 September 1988	list
(9581) 1990 DM_{3}	24 February 1990	list
(9582) 1990 EL_{7}	3 March 1990	list
(9591) 1991 FH_{2}	20 March 1991	list
9722 Levi-Montalcini	4 March 1981	list^{[A]}
(9734) 1986 CB_{2}	12 February 1986	list
(9736) 1986 QP_{2}	28 August 1986	list
(9738) 1987 DF_{6}	23 February 1987	list
(9740) 1987 ST_{11}	23 September 1987	list
(9759) 1991 NE_{7}	12 July 1991	list
(9858) 1991 OL_{1}	18 July 1991	list
(9935) 1986 CP_{1}	4 February 1986	list
(9944) 1990 DA_{3}	24 February 1990	list
9968 Serpe	4 May 1992	list
10045 Dorarussell	6 September 1985	list
10047 Davidchapman	28 August 1986	list
10052 Nason	16 September 1987	list
10053 Noeldetilly	16 September 1987	list
10056 Johnschroer	19 January 1988	list
10062 Kimhay	1 September 1988	list
10070 Liuzongli	7 February 1989	list
(10134) 1993 HL_{6}	17 April 1993	list
10271 Dymond	14 October 1980	list^{[C]}
10284 Damienlemay	24 August 1981	list
10333 Portnoff	12 July 1991	list
10485 Sarahyeomans	21 September 1984	list
10486 Teron	15 February 1985	list
10491 Chou	27 August 1986	list
10492 Mizzi	28 August 1986	list
10493 Pulliah	28 August 1986	list
10494 Jenniferwest	29 August 1986	list
10499 Sarty	7 September 1986	list
10503 Johnmarks	27 September 1987	list
10505 Johnnycash	22 January 1988	list
10508 Haughey	1 September 1988	list
10513 Mackie	2 October 1989	list
10514 Harlow	4 October 1989	list
10521 Jeremyhansen	14 September 1990	list
10682 Kutryk	22 May 1980	list
10703 Saint-Jacques	23 August 1981	list
10704 Sidey	1 September 1981	list
10731 Dollyparton	16 January 1988	list
(10732) 1988 BM_{3}	17 January 1988	list
(10748) 1989 CE_{8}	8 February 1989	list
(10755) 1990 RO_{6}	10 September 1990	list
(10777) 1991 EB_{5}	13 March 1991	list
(10800) 1992 OM_{8}	22 July 1992	list^{[D]}
(11023) 1986 QZ	26 August 1986	list
(11024) 1986 QC_{1}	26 August 1986	list
(11025) 1986 QJ_{1}	27 August 1986	list
(11031) 1988 RC_{5}	2 September 1988	list
(11032) 1988 RE_{5}	2 September 1988	list
(11286) 1990 RO_{8}	15 September 1990	list
(11297) 1992 PP_{6}	5 August 1992	list^{[D]}
(11452) 1980 KE	22 May 1980	list
(11474) 1982 SM2	18 September 1982	list
(11483) 1988 BC_{4}	19 January 1988	list
(11486) 1988 RE_{6}	5 September 1988	list
(11505) 1990 DW_{2}	24 February 1990	list
11517 Esteracuna	12 March 1991	list
11538 Brunico	22 July 1992	list^{[D]}
11828 Vargha	26 February 1984	list
11829 Tuvikene	4 March 1984	list
11832 Pustylnik	21 September 1984	list
(11834) 1985 RQ_{3}	7 September 1985	list
(11835) 1985 RA_{4}	10 September 1985	list
(11839) 1986 QX_{1}	27 August 1986	list
(11840) 1986 QR_{2}	28 August 1986	list
(11843) 1987 DM_{6}	23 February 1987	list
(11845) 1987 RZ	12 September 1987	list
(11857) 1988 RK_{9}	1 September 1988	list
(11866) 1989 SL_{12}	30 September 1989	list
(11877) 1990 EL_{8}	5 March 1990	list
(11884) 1990 RD_{6}	8 September 1990	list
(11891) 1991 FJ_{2}	20 March 1991	list
(11892) 1991 FT_{2}	20 March 1991	list
(11893) 1991 FZ_{2}	20 March 1991	list
(11909) 1992 HD_{5}	25 April 1992	list

Name	Discovery Date	Listing
(12212) 1981 QR_{2}	23 August 1981	list
(12213) 1981 QN_{3}	26 August 1981	list
(12230) 1986 QN	25 August 1986	list
(12231) 1986 QQ_{1}	27 August 1986	list
(12232) 1986 QZ_{2}	28 August 1986	list
(12233) 1986 QF_{3}	29 August 1986	list
(12236) 1987 DD_{6}	22 February 1987	list
(12245) 1988 RM_{7}	9 September 1988	list
(12256) 1989 CJ_{8}	8 February 1989	list
(12260) 1989 SP_{11}	30 September 1989	list
(12285) 1991 FN_{2}	20 March 1991	list
(12683) 1983 RP_{3}	2 September 1983	list
(12684) 1984 DQ	23 February 1984	list
(12699) 1990 DD_{2}	24 February 1990	list
(12703) 1990 SV_{13}	23 September 1990	list
(12712) 1991 EY_{3}	12 March 1991	list
(12713) 1991 FY_{3}	22 March 1991	list
(12720) 1991 NU_{3}	6 July 1991	list
12757 Yangtze	14 September 1993	list^{[E]}
12987 Racalmuto	5 March 1981	list^{[A]}
(13000) 1981 QK_{3}	25 August 1981	list
(13008) 1984 SE_{6}	22 September 1984	list
(13013) 1987 SP_{12}	16 September 1987	list
(13021) 1988 RY_{5}	3 September 1988	list
(13022) 1988 RL_{9}	1 September 1988	list
(13048) 1990 RR_{7}	13 September 1990	list
(13061) 1991 FL_{2}	20 March 1991	list
(13485) 1981 QJ_{3}	25 August 1981	list
(13495) 1985 RD_{3}	6 September 1985	list
(13496) 1985 RF_{3}	6 September 1985	list
(13503) 1988 RH_{6}	6 September 1988	list
13554 Decleir	8 May 1992	list
(13555) 1992 JB_{2}	2 May 1992	list
(13556) 1992 OY_{7}	21 July 1992	list^{[D]}
13557 Lievetruwant	24 July 1992	list
(13558) 1992 PR_{6}	5 August 1992	list^{[D]}
(13919) 1984 SO_{4}	21 September 1984	list
(13925) 1986 QS_{3}	29 August 1986	list
(13941) 1989 TF_{14}	2 October 1989	list
(13959) 1991 EL_{4}	12 March 1991	list
(13979) 1992 JH_{3}	8 May 1992	list
(13981) 1992 OT_{9}	28 July 1992	list^{[D]}
(14340) 1983 RQ_{3}	2 September 1983	list
(14341) 1983 RV_{3}	4 September 1983	list
(14343) 1984 SM_{5}	18 September 1984	list
(14344) 1985 CP_{2}	15 February 1985	list
(14347) 1985 RL_{4}	11 September 1985	list
(14352) 1987 DK_{6}	23 February 1987	list
(14353) 1987 DN_{6}	23 February 1987	list
(14358) 1988 BY_{3}	19 January 1988	list
(14376) 1989 ST_{10}	28 September 1989	list
(14378) 1989 TA_{16}	4 October 1989	list
14382 Woszczyk	2 March 1990	list
(14392) 1990 RS_{6}	11 September 1990	list
(14404) 1991 NQ_{6}	11 July 1991	list
(14813) 1981 QW_{2}	23 August 1981	list
(14817) 1982 FJ_{3}	21 March 1982	list
(14822) 1984 SR_{5}	21 September 1984	list
(14823) 1984 ST_{5}	21 September 1984	list
(14824) 1985 CF_{2}	13 February 1985	list
(14828) 1986 QT_{1}	27 August 1986	list
(14838) 1988 RK_{6}	6 September 1988	list
(14855) 1989 SP_{9}	25 September 1989	list
(14861) 1990 DA_{2}	24 February 1990	list
(14868) 1990 RA_{7}	13 September 1990	list
(14870) 1990 SM_{14}	24 September 1990	list
(14898) 1992 JR_{3}	7 May 1992	list
(15223) 1984 SN_{4}	21 September 1984	list
(15225) 1985 RJ_{4}	11 September 1985	list
15230 Alona	13 September 1987	list
(15232) 1987 SD_{13}	24 September 1987	list
(15236) 1988 RJ_{4}	1 September 1988	list
(15237) 1988 RL_{6}	6 September 1988	list
(15245) 1989 TP_{16}	4 October 1989	list
(15257) 1990 RQ_{8}	15 September 1990	list
(15261) 1990 SV_{12}	21 September 1990	list
(15328) 1993 RJ_{9}	14 September 1993	list^{[E]}
(15693) 1984 SN_{6}	23 September 1984	list
(15694) 1985 RR_{3}	7 September 1985	list
(15696) 1986 QG_{1}	26 August 1986	list
(15697) 1986 QO_{1}	27 August 1986	list
(15698) 1986 QO_{2}	28 August 1986	list
(15701) 1987 RG_{1}	13 September 1987	list
15705 Hautot	14 January 1988	list
(15707) 1988 RN_{4}	1 September 1988	list
(15714) 1989 TL_{15}	3 October 1989	list
(15743) 1991 ND_{7}	12 July 1991	list
16368 Città di Alba	28 February 1981	list^{[A]}
16372 Demichele	7 March 1981	list^{[A]}
(16401) 1984 SV_{5}	21 September 1984	list
(16404) 1985 CM_{1}	13 February 1985	list
16405 Testudo	20 February 1985	list
(16409) 1986 CZ_{1}	12 February 1986	list
(16410) 1986 QU_{2}	28 August 1986	list
(16411) 1986 QY_{2}	28 August 1986	list
(16422) 1988 BT_{3}	18 January 1988	list
(16423) 1988 BZ_{3}	19 January 1988	list
(16453) 1989 SW_{8}	23 September 1989	list
(16455) 1989 TK_{16}	4 October 1989	list
(16462) 1990 DZ_{1}	24 February 1990	list
(16467) 1990 FD_{3}	16 March 1990	list
(16487) 1990 RV_{5}	8 September 1990	list
(16501) 1990 SX_{13}	23 September 1990	list
(16502) 1990 SB_{14}	23 September 1990	list
(16535) 1991 NF_{3}	4 July 1991	list
(16581) 1992 JF_{3}	8 May 1992	list
(16582) 1992 JS_{3}	11 May 1992	list
16623 Muenzel	14 April 1993	list
(16643) 1993 RV_{15}	15 September 1993	list^{[E]}
(17401) 1985 RP_{3}	7 September 1985	list
(17409) 1988 BA_{4}	19 January 1988	list
(17413) 1988 RT_{4}	1 September 1988	list
17428 Charleroi	28 February 1989	list
(17440) 1989 TP_{14}	2 October 1989	list
(17471) 1991 EO_{2}	11 March 1991	list
17473 Freddiemercury	21 March 1991	list
(17507) 1992 HH_{5}	24 April 1992	list
(17510) 1992 PD_{6}	1 August 1992	list^{[D]}
(17569) 1994 LB_{8}	8 June 1994	list^{[E]}
(18319) 1981 QS_{2}	23 August 1981	list
(18323) 1983 RZ_{2}	2 September 1983	list
(18326) 1985 CV_{1}	11 February 1985	list
(18327) 1985 CX_{1}	12 February 1985	list
(18329) 1986 RY_{4}	1 September 1986	list
(18331) 1987 DQ_{6}	24 February 1987	list
(18342) 1989 ST_{9}	26 September 1989	list
(18367) 1991 FS_{1}	17 March 1991	list
(18389) 1992 JU_{2}	4 May 1992	list
(18390) 1992 JD_{3}	7 May 1992	list
(19121) 1985 CY_{1}	12 February 1985	list
(19143) 1989 SA_{10}	26 September 1989	list
(19166) 1991 EY_{1}	7 March 1991	list
(19167) 1991 ED_{2}	9 March 1991	list
(19168) 1991 EO_{5}	14 March 1991	list
(19172) 1991 FC_{4}	22 March 1991	list
(19174) 1991 NS_{6}	11 July 1991	list
(19227) 1993 RH_{16}	15 September 1993	list^{[E]}
(19926) 1979 YQ	17 December 1979	list^{[B]}
(19958) 1985 RN_{4}	11 September 1985	list
(19960) 1986 CN_{1}	3 February 1986	list
(19961) 1986 QP_{3}	29 August 1986	list
(19965) 1987 RO_{1}	14 September 1987	list
(19967) 1987 SN_{12}	16 September 1987	list
(19971) 1988 RZ_{5}	3 September 1988	list
(19972) 1988 RD_{6}	5 September 1988	list
(19989) 1990 RN_{8}	15 September 1990	list
(20003) 1991 EX_{2}	11 March 1991	list
(20008) 1991 NG_{3}	4 July 1991	list
(20990) 1983 RL_{3}	1 September 1983	list
(20992) 1985 RV_{2}	5 September 1985	list
(20993) 1985 RX_{2}	5 September 1985	list
(20998) 1986 QF_{1}	26 August 1986	list
(21004) 1988 BM_{4}	22 January 1988	list
(21011) 1988 RP_{4}	1 September 1988	list
(21012) 1988 RU_{9}	8 September 1988	list
(21023) 1989 DK	28 February 1989	list
(21031) 1989 TO_{15}	3 October 1989	list
(21032) 1989 TN_{16}	4 October 1989	list
(21066) 1991 NG_{5}	10 July 1991	list
(21101) 1992 OJ_{1}	26 July 1992	list
(21158) 1993 RP_{18}	15 September 1993	list^{[E]}
(22273) 1981 QO_{3}	26 August 1981	list
22278 Protitch	2 September 1983	list
(22279) 1984 DM	23 February 1984	list
22280 Mandragora	12 February 1985	list
(22286) 1988 BO_{3}	18 January 1988	list
(22295) 1989 SZ_{9}	26 September 1989	list
(22311) 1991 EF_{2}	10 March 1991	list
(23438) 1984 SZ_{5}	21 September 1984	list
(23440) 1986 QH_{1}	27 August 1986	list
(23441) 1986 QW_{1}	27 August 1986	list
(23442) 1986 QJ_{2}	28 August 1986	list
(23460) 1989 SX_{9}	26 September 1989	list
(23464) 1989 TN_{15}	3 October 1989	list
(23466) 1990 DU_{4}	28 February 1990	list
(23485) 1991 NV_{6}	12 July 1991	list
(24636) 1981 QM_{2}	27 August 1981	list
(24650) 1986 QM	25 August 1986	list
(24651) 1986 QU	26 August 1986	list
(24652) 1986 QY_{1}	28 August 1986	list
(24657) 1987 SP_{11}	17 September 1987	list
(24659) 1988 AD_{5}	14 January 1988	list
(24667) 1988 RF_{4}	1 September 1988	list
(24683) 1990 DV_{3}	26 February 1990	list
(24692) 1990 RO_{7}	13 September 1990	list
(24783) 1993 SQ_{13}	16 September 1993	list^{[E]}
(24792) 1993 TB_{46}	10 October 1993	list
(26091) 1987 RL_{1}	13 September 1987	list
(26110) 1991 NK_{4}	8 July 1991	list
(26135) 1993 GL_{1}	12 April 1993	list
(26799) 1979 XL	15 December 1979	list^{[B]}
26800 Gualtierotrucco	6 March 1981	list^{[A]}
(26810) 1985 CL_{2}	14 February 1985	list
(26812) 1985 RQ_{2}	4 September 1985	list
(26813) 1985 RN_{3}	7 September 1985	list
(26815) 1986 QR_{1}	27 August 1986	list
(26835) 1990 SH_{13}	23 September 1990	list
(26867) 1993 GK_{1}	12 April 1993	list
(27705) 1985 DU_{1}	16 February 1985	list
(27707) 1986 QY_{3}	31 August 1986	list
(27732) 1990 RH_{7}	13 September 1990	list
(27733) 1990 RM_{7}	13 September 1990	list
(27734) 1990 RA_{8}	14 September 1990	list
(27751) 1991 FQ_{2}	20 March 1991	list
(29121) 1981 QP_{2}	23 August 1981	list
(29124) 1984 SW_{6}	28 September 1984	list
(29126) 1985 CU_{1}	11 February 1985	list
(29129) 1985 RG_{3}	6 September 1985	list
(29131) 1986 QU_{1}	27 August 1986	list
(29134) 1987 RW	12 September 1987	list
(29138) 1988 BE_{4}	20 January 1988	list
(29150) 1988 RM_{5}	2 September 1988	list
(29177) 1990 RF_{7}	13 September 1990	list
(29200) 1991 FX_{2}	20 March 1991	list
(29205) 1991 NM_{6}	11 July 1991	list
29298 Cruls	16 September 1993	list^{[E]}
(30789) 1988 RB_{6}	3 September 1988	list
(30804) 1989 TO_{14}	2 October 1989	list
(30809) 1990 EO_{8}	7 March 1990	list
(30916) 1993 GN_{1}	14 April 1993	list
(32767) 1983 RY_{2}	1 September 1983	list
(32771) 1985 RK_{3}	6 September 1985	list
(32790) 1989 SM_{8}	23 September 1989	list
(32793) 1989 TQ_{15}	3 October 1989	list
(32806) 1990 SF_{13}	22 September 1990	list
(32847) 1992 JO_{3}	1 May 1992	list
(32884) 1993 SO_{14}	16 September 1993	list^{[E]}
34892 Evapalisa	15 November 2001	list^{[E]}
(35057) 1984 SP_{4}	23 September 1984	list
(35058) 1985 RP_{4}	12 September 1985	list
(35059) 1986 QM_{1}	27 August 1986	list
(35060) 1986 QG_{3}	29 August 1986	list
(35061) 1986 QL_{3}	29 August 1986	list
(35073) 1989 TG_{16}	4 October 1989	list
(35167) 1993 RX_{13}	14 September 1993	list^{[E]}
(37558) 1984 SG_{6}	22 September 1984	list
(37560) 1986 QK_{3}	29 August 1986	list
(37624) 1993 RT_{8}	14 September 1993	list^{[E]}
(39511) 1985 SH_{1}	18 September 1985	list
(39513) 1986 QE_{1}	26 August 1986	list
(39528) 1989 TB_{16}	4 October 1989	list
(39535) 1990 RX_{7}	14 September 1990	list
(39538) 1991 FD_{2}	20 March 1991	list
(39559) 1992 OL_{8}	22 July 1992	list^{[D]}
(39598) 1993 RG_{13}	14 September 1993	list^{[E]}
(42477) 1981 QB_{3}	24 August 1981	list
(43750) 1981 QG_{3}	25 August 1981	list
(43757) 1984 DB_{1}	27 February 1984	list
(43759) 1986 QW_{2}	28 August 1986	list
(43760) 1986 QD_{3}	29 August 1986	list
(43761) 1986 QQ_{3}	29 August 1986	list
(43780) 1989 SL_{8}	23 September 1989	list
(43849) 1993 RB_{11}	14 September 1993	list^{[E]}
(43850) 1993 SB_{14}	16 September 1993	list^{[E]}
(46541) 1984 SM_{6}	23 September 1984	list
(46543) 1987 DL_{6}	23 February 1987	list
(46556) 1991 FU_{3}	22 March 1991	list
(46557) 1991 FW_{3}	22 March 1991	list
(48407) 1981 QL_{2}	27 August 1981	list
48411 Johnventre	5 September 1985	list
(48412) 1986 QN_{1}	27 August 1986	list
(48419) 1988 RB_{5}	2 September 1988	list
(48420) 1988 RN_{5}	2 September 1988	list
(48429) 1989 SK_{10}	28 September 1989	list
(48449) 1991 EK_{4}	12 March 1991	list
(48491) 1992 HG_{5}	24 April 1992	list
(48538) 1993 RF_{15}	15 September 1993	list^{[E]}
(48539) 1993 SD_{11}	22 September 1993	list^{[E]}
52242 Michelemaoret	3 March 1981	list^{[A]}
(52265) 1985 RM_{3}	7 September 1985	list
(52272) 1988 RO_{5}	2 September 1988	list
(52300) 1991 NE_{3}	4 July 1991	list
(52399) 1993 RM_{15}	15 September 1993	list^{[E]}
(52400) 1993 SG_{14}	16 September 1993	list^{[E]}
(52424) 1994 LX_{3}	3 June 1994	list
(52425) 1994 LU_{8}	8 June 1994	list^{[E]}
(55732) 1986 QN_{2}	28 August 1986	list
(55743) 1990 RF_{6}	9 September 1990	list
(55744) 1990 RL_{7}	13 September 1990	list
(55747) 1990 SQ_{14}	25 September 1990	list
(55751) 1991 NM_{4}	8 July 1991	list
(55769) 1992 HJ_{5}	24 April 1992	list
(55789) 1993 RF_{11}	14 September 1993	list^{[E]}
(55790) 1993 RP_{15}	15 September 1993	list^{[E]}
(58142) 1983 RW_{3}	4 September 1983	list
(58149) 1987 SX_{11}	26 September 1987	list
(58257) 1993 RN_{9}	14 September 1993	list^{[E]}
(58258) 1993 RU_{10}	14 September 1993	list^{[E]}
(58259) 1993 RA_{13}	14 September 1993	list^{[E]}
(65147) 2002 CN_{116}	15 February 2002	list^{[E]}
65210 Stichius	2 March 2002	list^{[E]}
(65656) 1981 RR_{1}	1 September 1981	list
(65662) 1986 QD_{1}	26 August 1986	list
(65663) 1986 QC_{3}	29 August 1986	list
(65664) 1986 RE_{5}	4 September 1986	list
(65665) 1986 RP_{5}	9 September 1986	list
(65666) 1987 RU	12 September 1987	list
(65673) 1988 RH_{4}	1 September 1988	list
(65738) 1993 RE_{9}	14 September 1993	list^{[E]}
(65739) 1993 SG_{13}	16 September 1993	list^{[E]}
69245 Persiceto	1 March 1981	list^{[A]}
(69265) 1988 RF_{6}	5 September 1988	list
(69266) 1988 RJ_{6}	6 September 1988	list
(69267) 1988 RO_{6}	7 September 1988	list
(69280) 1990 RB_{7}	13 September 1990	list
(69285) 1990 ST_{14}	25 September 1990	list
(73672) 1986 QR	26 August 1986	list
(73680) 1989 SP_{10}	28 September 1989	list
(78955) 2003 SQ_{221}	26 September 2003	list^{[E]}
(79116) 1984 ST_{6}	27 September 1984	list
(79119) 1989 SC_{10}	26 September 1989	list
(79122) 1990 RV_{7}	14 September 1990	list
(79123) 1990 RT_{8}	15 September 1990	list
(79124) 1990 RU_{8}	15 September 1990	list
(79128) 1990 SB_{13}	22 September 1990	list
(79136) 1991 ND_{4}	8 July 1991	list
(79146) 1992 JP_{3}	2 May 1992	list
(85156) 1987 RN_{1}	13 September 1987	list
(85249) 1993 RT_{11}	14 September 1993	list^{[E]}
(85250) 1993 RQ_{16}	15 September 1993	list^{[E]}
(85251) 1993 RJ_{18}	15 September 1993	list^{[E]}
(85252) 1993 SX_{12}	16 September 1993	list^{[E]}
(90697) 1983 RH_{3}	1 September 1983	list
(90699) 1986 QK	25 August 1986	list
(90700) 1986 QG_{2}	28 August 1986	list
(90701) 1986 RC_{5}	2 September 1986	list
(90756) 1993 RH_{9}	14 September 1993	list^{[E]}
(90757) 1993 RK_{13}	14 September 1993	list^{[E]}
(90760) 1993 SN_{10}	22 September 1993	list^{[E]}
(90761) 1993 SW_{13}	16 September 1993	list^{[E]}
(95335) 2002 CU_{118}	3 February 2002	list^{[E]}
(96185) 1990 RJ_{7}	13 September 1990	list
96189 Pygmalion	6 July 1991	list
(96220) 1993 SY_{13}	16 September 1993	list^{[E]}
(100003) 1983 RN_{3}	1 September 1983	list
(100006) 1987 DA_{7}	28 February 1987	list
(100009) 1988 RQ_{4}	1 September 1988	list
(100031) 1991 FM_{2}	20 March 1991	list
(100132) 1993 RR_{8}	14 September 1993	list^{[E]}
(100135) 1993 RR_{16}	15 September 1993	list^{[E]}
(100138) 1993 SN_{14}	16 September 1993	list^{[E]}
(120504) 1993 SS_{10}	22 September 1993	list^{[E]}
(120505) 1993 ST_{10}	22 September 1993	list^{[E]}
(120522) 1994 NU_{2}	11 July 1994	list^{[E]}
(134344) 1989 SG_{9}	24 September 1989	list
(149086) 2002 CM_{116}	15 February 2002	list^{[E]}
(152576) 1994 NR_{2}	11 July 1994	list^{[E]}
(160515) 1993 RP_{13}	14 September 1993	list^{[E]}
(161996) 1985 RH_{3}	6 September 1985	list
(164617) 1990 RP_{7}	13 September 1990	list
(168317) 1988 RY_{4}	2 September 1988	list
(175660) 1981 QC_{3}	24 August 1981	list
(175669) 1994 LT_{3}	3 June 1994	list
(181711) 1993 SC_{9}	22 September 1993	list^{[E]}
(189412) 1993 TZ_{43}	10 October 1993	list^{[E]}
(192292) 1990 RC_{7}	13 September 1990	list
(192307) 1993 RM_{16}	15 September 1993	list^{[E]}
(195090) 2002 CL_{116}	15 February 2002	list^{[E]}
(204973) 1993 SN_{9}	22 September 1993	list^{[E]}
(221949) 1993 SJ_{9}	22 September 1993	list^{[E]}
(231673) 1994 LD_{6}	3 June 1994	list
(306382) 1993 SL_{9}	22 September 1993	list^{[E]}
(312877) 2011 UY_{179}	15 September 1993	list^{[E]}
314082 Dryope	6 February 2005	list^{[E]}
(322169) 2010 XT_{18}	11 July 1994	list^{[E]}
(326269) 1994 LL_{4}	3 June 1994	list
(330056) 2005 UC_{423}	28 October 2005	list^{[E]}
(447464) 2006 NU	1 July 2006	list^{[E]}
Co-discovery made with:^{A} G. DeSanctis^{B} E. R. Netto^{C} L. Houziaux^{D} Á. López-G.^{E} E. W. Elst

== See also ==
- List of minor planet discoverers § H. Debehogne
