= Maillen =

Village in Wallonia, Belgium

Coordinates: 50°23′00″N 04°58′00″E

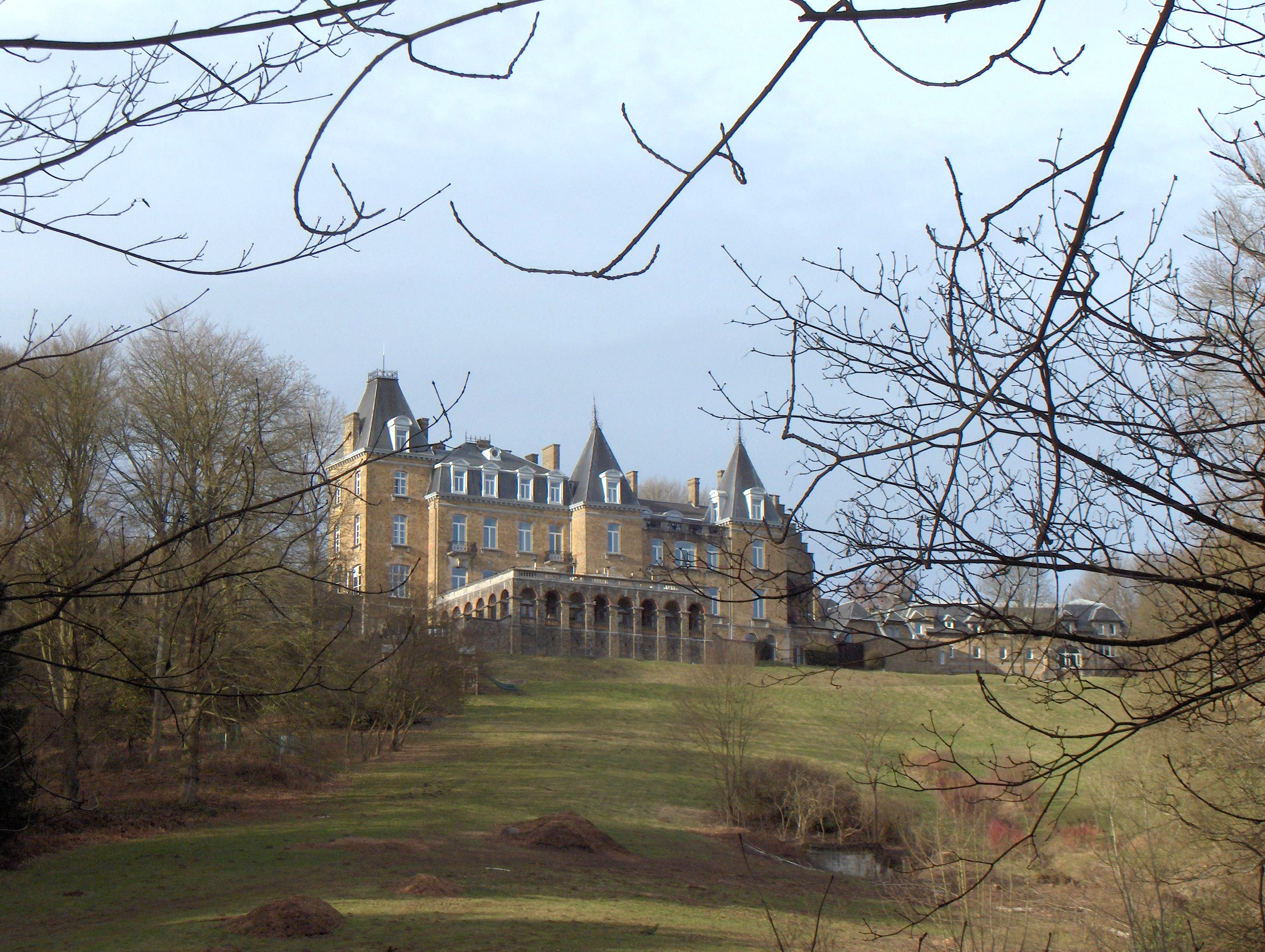
The Ronchinne Castle in Maillen is the former home of Princess Clémentine, daughter of Belgian King Leopold II.

Maillen (Walloon: Môyin) is a village of Wallonia and district of the municipality of Assesse, located in the province of Namur, Belgium.

Many Ancient Roman sites could be found in this town, including one at the site of the Ronchinne Castle built by Prince Victor Napoléon.
