= 9968 Serpe =

Asteroid

- Orbits of Serpe (blue), the inner planets and Jupiter (outermost)

Discovery
- Discovered by: H. Debehogne
- Discovery site: La Silla Obs.
- Discovery date: 4 May 1992

Designations
- Named after: Jean Serpe (Belgian physicist)
- Alternative designations: 1992 JS_{2} · 1977 VT; 1985 SC_{2} · 1988 KR_{1}
- Minor planet category: main-belt · (middle)

Orbital characteristics
- Epoch 4 September 2017 (JD 2458000.5)
- Uncertainty parameter 0
- Observation arc: 39.56 yr (14,451 days)
- Aphelion: 2.6974 AU
- Perihelion: 2.4354 AU
- Semi-major axis: 2.5664 AU
- Eccentricity: 0.0510
- Orbital period (sidereal): 4.11 yr (1,502 days)
- Mean anomaly: 346.96°
- Mean motion: 0° 14^{m} 22.92^{s} / day
- Inclination: 12.993°
- Longitude of ascending node: 213.10°
- Argument of perihelion: 78.256°

Physical characteristics
- Dimensions: 12.355±0.453 km
- Geometric albedo: 0.088±0.011
- Absolute magnitude (H): 13.0

9968 Serpe, provisional designation 1992 JS_{2}, is an asteroid from the middle regions of the asteroid belt, approximately 12 kilometers in diameter. This asteroid was discovered on 4 May 1992, by Belgian astronomer Henri Debehogne at ESO's La Silla Observatory in northern Chile. It was named after Belgian theoretical-physicist Jean Serpe, professor at University of Liège and member of the RASAB. The official naming citation was published by the Minor Planet Center on 17 May 2011 (M.P.C. 75102).

Serpe orbits the Sun in the middle main-belt at a distance of 2.4–2.7 AU once every 4 years and 1 month (1,502 days). Its orbit has an eccentricity of 0.05 and an inclination of 13° with respect to the ecliptic. In 1977, it was first observed as 1977 VT at Cerro El Roble Station in Argentina, extending the body's observation arc by 15 years prior to its official discovery at La Silla.

According to the survey carried out by NASA's Wide-field Infrared Survey Explorer with its subsequent NEOWISE mission, the asteroid measures 12.355 kilometers in diameter and its surface has an albedo of 0.088. As of 2017, no rotational lightcurve has been obtained of Serpe. The body's rotation period and shape, as well as its spectral type remain unknown.
