= 5160 Camoes =

Main-belt asteroid

Discovery
- Discovered by: H. Debehogne; E. R. Netto
- Discovery site: ESO–La Silla Obs.
- Discovery date: 23 December 1979

Designations
- Named after: Luís de Camões (Portuguese poet)
- Alternative designations: 1979 YO · 1988 BB_{3}
- Minor planet category: main-belt · (inner)

Orbital characteristics
- Epoch 4 September 2017 (JD 2458000.5)
- Uncertainty parameter 0
- Observation arc: 37.22 yr (13,593 days)
- Aphelion: 2.5715 AU
- Perihelion: 2.2316 AU
- Semi-major axis: 2.4016 AU
- Eccentricity: 0.0708
- Orbital period (sidereal): 3.72 yr (1,359 days)
- Mean anomaly: 209.42°
- Mean motion: 0° 15^{m} 53.28^{s} / day
- Inclination: 8.2916°
- Longitude of ascending node: 129.14°
- Argument of perihelion: 156.49°

Physical characteristics
- Dimensions: 5.984±0.137; 9±3 km (calculated)
- Geometric albedo: 0.259±0.075
- Absolute magnitude (H): 13.3

5160 Camoes, provisional designation 1979 YO, is an asteroid from the inner regions of the asteroid belt, approximately 6 kilometers in diameter. The asteroid was discovered on 23 December 1979, by Belgian astronomer Henri Debehogne and Brazilian astronomer Edgar Netto at ESO's La Silla Observatory in northern Chile. It was later named for Portuguese poet Luís de Camões.

== Orbit and classification ==
Camoes orbits the Sun in the inner main-belt at a distance of 2.2–2.6 AU once every 3 years and 9 months (1,359 days). Its orbit has an eccentricity of 0.07 and an inclination of 8° with respect to the ecliptic. The asteroid's observation arc starts in 1979, as no precoveries were taken and no identifications were made prior to its discovery.

== Physical characteristics ==
Based on an absolute magnitude of 13.3 and assuming a generic albedo over the range of 0.05 to 0.25, Camoes measures between 6 and 12 kilometers in diameter.

According to the survey carried out by NASA's Wide-field Infrared Survey Explorer with its subsequent NEOWISE mission, Camoes measures 6.0 kilometers in diameter and its surface has an albedo of 0.259. As of 2016, the asteroid's composition, rotation period and shape remain unknown.

== Naming ==
This minor planet was named after Portugal's and the Portuguese language's greatest poet, Luís de Camões (1524–1580). His epic Os Lusíadas (The Lusiads), a fantastical interpretation of the Portuguese voyages of discovery during the 15th and 16th centuries, shows an extraordinary knowledge of astronomy. The official naming citation was published by the Minor Planet Center on 6 February 1993 (M.P.C. 21610).
