= List of minor planets: 43001–44000 =

The following is a partial list of minor planets, running from minor-planet number 43001 through 44000, inclusive. The primary data for this and other partial lists is based on JPL's "Small-Body Orbital Elements" and data available from the Minor Planet Center. Critical list information is also provided by the MPC, unless otherwise specified from Lowell Observatory. A detailed description of the table's columns and additional sources are given on the main page including a complete list of every page in this series, and a statistical break-up on the dynamical classification of minor planets.

Also see the summary list of all named bodies in numerical and alphabetical order, and the corresponding naming citations for the number range of this particular list. New namings may only be added to this list after official publication, as the preannouncement of names is condemned by the Working Group for Small Bodies Nomenclature of the International Astronomical Union.

Near-Earth obj.	MBA (inner)	MBA (outer)	Centaur
Mars-crosser	MBA (middle)	Jupiter trojan	Trans-Neptunian obj.
Unclassified

== 43001–43100 ==
Designation			Discovery			Properties		Ref
Permanent	Provisional	Named after	Date	Site	Discoverer(s)	Category	Diam.	Ref
43001	1999 UE_{9}	—	October 29, 1999	Catalina	CSS	KOR	5.1 km	MPC · JPL
43002	1999 US_{12}	—	October 29, 1999	Catalina	CSS	·	2.6 km	MPC · JPL
43003	1999 UC_{14}	—	October 29, 1999	Catalina	CSS	·	1.8 km	MPC · JPL
43004	1999 UR_{16}	—	October 29, 1999	Catalina	CSS	AGN	2.9 km	MPC · JPL
43005	1999 UA_{17}	—	October 30, 1999	Catalina	CSS	·	3.0 km	MPC · JPL
43006	1999 UG_{26}	—	October 30, 1999	Catalina	CSS	·	5.3 km	MPC · JPL
43007	1999 UK_{27}	—	October 30, 1999	Kitt Peak	Spacewatch	NYS	2.6 km	MPC · JPL
43008	1999 UD_{31}	—	October 31, 1999	Kitt Peak	Spacewatch	moon	2.7 km	MPC · JPL
43009	1999 UB_{39}	—	October 29, 1999	Anderson Mesa	LONEOS	·	8.0 km	MPC · JPL
43010	1999 UE_{41}	—	October 17, 1999	Anderson Mesa	LONEOS	·	3.9 km	MPC · JPL
43011	1999 UD_{42}	—	October 20, 1999	Socorro	LINEAR	·	2.4 km	MPC · JPL
43012	1999 US_{49}	—	October 30, 1999	Catalina	CSS	·	2.7 km	MPC · JPL
43013	1999 UX_{50}	—	October 30, 1999	Catalina	CSS	NYS	1.5 km	MPC · JPL
43014	1999 UQ_{51}	—	October 31, 1999	Catalina	CSS	EOS	8.5 km	MPC · JPL
43015	1999 UD_{52}	—	October 31, 1999	Catalina	CSS	V	1.6 km	MPC · JPL
43016	1999 VM	—	November 2, 1999	Oaxaca	Roe, J. M.	·	3.7 km	MPC · JPL
43017	1999 VA_{2}	—	November 5, 1999	Oaxaca	Roe, J. M.	·	2.0 km	MPC · JPL
43018	1999 VY_{2}	—	November 4, 1999	Nachi-Katsuura	Y. Shimizu, T. Urata	GEF	4.6 km	MPC · JPL
43019	1999 VG_{3}	—	November 1, 1999	Kitt Peak	Spacewatch	THM · fast	9.8 km	MPC · JPL
43020	1999 VO_{4}	—	November 1, 1999	Catalina	CSS	·	4.3 km	MPC · JPL
43021	1999 VT_{5}	—	November 4, 1999	Nachi-Katsuura	Y. Shimizu, T. Urata	·	4.0 km	MPC · JPL
43022	1999 VR_{7}	—	November 7, 1999	Višnjan Observatory	K. Korlević	·	13 km	MPC · JPL
43023	1999 VS_{12}	—	November 11, 1999	Fountain Hills	C. W. Juels	·	3.2 km	MPC · JPL
43024	1999 VU_{12}	—	November 11, 1999	Fountain Hills	C. W. Juels	·	7.9 km	MPC · JPL
43025 Valusha	1999 VW_{12}	Valusha	November 1, 1999	Uccle	E. W. Elst, Ipatov, S. I.	·	2.8 km	MPC · JPL
43026	1999 VJ_{20}	—	November 11, 1999	Fountain Hills	C. W. Juels	EUN	4.0 km	MPC · JPL
43027 Minusio	1999 VA_{23}	Minusio	November 12, 1999	Gnosca	S. Sposetti	·	3.9 km	MPC · JPL
43028 Gnosca	1999 VE_{23}	Gnosca	November 12, 1999	Gnosca	S. Sposetti	·	5.6 km	MPC · JPL
43029	1999 VT_{24}	—	November 13, 1999	Oizumi	T. Kobayashi	NYS	3.3 km	MPC · JPL
43030	1999 VK_{25}	—	November 13, 1999	Oizumi	T. Kobayashi	·	2.9 km	MPC · JPL
43031	1999 VY_{25}	—	November 14, 1999	Farpoint	G. Hug, G. Bell	·	4.3 km	MPC · JPL
43032	1999 VR_{26}	—	November 3, 1999	Socorro	LINEAR	KOR	4.4 km	MPC · JPL
43033	1999 VT_{29}	—	November 3, 1999	Socorro	LINEAR	·	10 km	MPC · JPL
43034	1999 VO_{34}	—	November 3, 1999	Socorro	LINEAR	·	4.4 km	MPC · JPL
43035	1999 VO_{35}	—	November 3, 1999	Socorro	LINEAR	·	8.4 km	MPC · JPL
43036	1999 VF_{37}	—	November 3, 1999	Socorro	LINEAR	·	4.6 km	MPC · JPL
43037	1999 VH_{37}	—	November 3, 1999	Socorro	LINEAR	·	7.8 km	MPC · JPL
43038	1999 VV_{44}	—	November 4, 1999	Catalina	CSS	·	2.9 km	MPC · JPL
43039	1999 VD_{45}	—	November 4, 1999	Catalina	CSS	·	3.3 km	MPC · JPL
43040	1999 VT_{45}	—	November 4, 1999	Catalina	CSS	V	2.0 km	MPC · JPL
43041	1999 VC_{47}	—	November 4, 1999	Socorro	LINEAR	EUN	3.6 km	MPC · JPL
43042	1999 VF_{47}	—	November 4, 1999	Socorro	LINEAR	EUN	3.8 km	MPC · JPL
43043	1999 VN_{49}	—	November 3, 1999	Socorro	LINEAR	·	4.5 km	MPC · JPL
43044	1999 VR_{49}	—	November 3, 1999	Socorro	LINEAR	WIT	3.2 km	MPC · JPL
43045	1999 VV_{49}	—	November 3, 1999	Socorro	LINEAR	·	5.8 km	MPC · JPL
43046	1999 VF_{50}	—	November 3, 1999	Socorro	LINEAR	·	2.2 km	MPC · JPL
43047	1999 VT_{56}	—	November 4, 1999	Socorro	LINEAR	·	2.6 km	MPC · JPL
43048	1999 VR_{59}	—	November 4, 1999	Socorro	LINEAR	·	3.3 km	MPC · JPL
43049	1999 VD_{61}	—	November 4, 1999	Socorro	LINEAR	·	4.1 km	MPC · JPL
43050	1999 VL_{66}	—	November 4, 1999	Socorro	LINEAR	·	9.4 km	MPC · JPL
43051	1999 VF_{71}	—	November 4, 1999	Socorro	LINEAR	KOR	4.1 km	MPC · JPL
43052	1999 VJ_{71}	—	November 4, 1999	Socorro	LINEAR	slow	1.9 km	MPC · JPL
43053	1999 VD_{72}	—	November 11, 1999	Xinglong	SCAP	EUN	3.8 km	MPC · JPL
43054	1999 VU_{78}	—	November 4, 1999	Socorro	LINEAR	NYS	3.3 km	MPC · JPL
43055	1999 VR_{81}	—	November 5, 1999	Socorro	LINEAR	·	2.8 km	MPC · JPL
43056	1999 VW_{88}	—	November 4, 1999	Socorro	LINEAR	KOR	3.2 km	MPC · JPL
43057	1999 VN_{92}	—	November 9, 1999	Socorro	LINEAR	·	3.2 km	MPC · JPL
43058	1999 VT_{92}	—	November 9, 1999	Socorro	LINEAR	NYS	3.0 km	MPC · JPL
43059	1999 VF_{93}	—	November 9, 1999	Socorro	LINEAR	·	2.0 km	MPC · JPL
43060	1999 VS_{93}	—	November 9, 1999	Socorro	LINEAR	MAS	1.8 km	MPC · JPL
43061	1999 VU_{93}	—	November 9, 1999	Socorro	LINEAR	·	2.7 km	MPC · JPL
43062	1999 VC_{103}	—	November 9, 1999	Socorro	LINEAR	·	2.8 km	MPC · JPL
43063	1999 VC_{104}	—	November 9, 1999	Socorro	LINEAR	·	2.1 km	MPC · JPL
43064	1999 VK_{114}	—	November 9, 1999	Catalina	CSS	·	3.5 km	MPC · JPL
43065	1999 VZ_{124}	—	November 10, 1999	Socorro	LINEAR	·	3.4 km	MPC · JPL
43066	1999 VJ_{135}	—	November 13, 1999	Anderson Mesa	LONEOS	·	2.4 km	MPC · JPL
43067	1999 VA_{140}	—	November 10, 1999	Kitt Peak	Spacewatch	NYS	2.1 km	MPC · JPL
43068	1999 VK_{159}	—	November 14, 1999	Socorro	LINEAR	HOF	6.0 km	MPC · JPL
43069	1999 VO_{160}	—	November 14, 1999	Socorro	LINEAR	·	2.5 km	MPC · JPL
43070	1999 VD_{161}	—	November 14, 1999	Socorro	LINEAR	·	4.2 km	MPC · JPL
43071	1999 VA_{173}	—	November 15, 1999	Socorro	LINEAR	PAD	5.0 km	MPC · JPL
43072	1999 VS_{177}	—	November 6, 1999	Socorro	LINEAR	·	2.6 km	MPC · JPL
43073	1999 VP_{184}	—	November 15, 1999	Socorro	LINEAR	·	2.3 km	MPC · JPL
43074	1999 VT_{188}	—	November 15, 1999	Socorro	LINEAR	·	6.1 km	MPC · JPL
43075	1999 VJ_{189}	—	November 15, 1999	Socorro	LINEAR	EOS	4.4 km	MPC · JPL
43076	1999 VW_{189}	—	November 15, 1999	Socorro	LINEAR	·	3.7 km	MPC · JPL
43077	1999 VY_{191}	—	November 14, 1999	Socorro	LINEAR	·	2.8 km	MPC · JPL
43078	1999 VX_{192}	—	November 1, 1999	Anderson Mesa	LONEOS	V	1.9 km	MPC · JPL
43079	1999 VS_{194}	—	November 1, 1999	Catalina	CSS	·	4.9 km	MPC · JPL
43080	1999 VA_{198}	—	November 3, 1999	Catalina	CSS	·	2.8 km	MPC · JPL
43081 Stephenschwartz	1999 VA_{199}	Stephenschwartz	November 4, 1999	Anderson Mesa	LONEOS	·	2.2 km	MPC · JPL
43082	1999 VH_{216}	—	November 3, 1999	Socorro	LINEAR	·	3.4 km	MPC · JPL
43083 Frankconrad	1999 WR	Frankconrad	November 19, 1999	Baton Rouge	W. R. Cooney Jr.	·	5.6 km	MPC · JPL
43084	1999 WQ_{1}	—	November 30, 1999	Socorro	LINEAR	·	13 km	MPC · JPL
43085	1999 WE_{2}	—	November 19, 1999	Ondřejov	P. Kušnirák	·	3.2 km	MPC · JPL
43086	1999 WB_{7}	—	November 28, 1999	Višnjan Observatory	K. Korlević	·	3.8 km	MPC · JPL
43087 Castegna	1999 WW_{8}	Castegna	November 28, 1999	Gnosca	S. Sposetti	THB	13 km	MPC · JPL
43088	1999 WO_{9}	—	November 30, 1999	Chiyoda	T. Kojima	·	2.9 km	MPC · JPL
43089	1999 WP_{12}	—	November 29, 1999	Kitt Peak	Spacewatch	·	9.1 km	MPC · JPL
43090	1999 WF_{20}	—	November 16, 1999	Socorro	LINEAR	EUN	3.5 km	MPC · JPL
43091	1999 XL_{1}	—	December 2, 1999	Oizumi	T. Kobayashi	INA	9.8 km	MPC · JPL
43092	1999 XT_{5}	—	December 4, 1999	Catalina	CSS	KOR	3.0 km	MPC · JPL
43093	1999 XA_{7}	—	December 4, 1999	Catalina	CSS	EOS	5.9 km	MPC · JPL
43094	1999 XK_{7}	—	December 4, 1999	Fountain Hills	C. W. Juels	EUN	8.1 km	MPC · JPL
43095	1999 XF_{8}	—	December 3, 1999	Oizumi	T. Kobayashi	VER	9.4 km	MPC · JPL
43096	1999 XL_{11}	—	December 5, 1999	Catalina	CSS	·	3.5 km	MPC · JPL
43097	1999 XM_{13}	—	December 5, 1999	Socorro	LINEAR	·	3.8 km	MPC · JPL
43098	1999 XD_{14}	—	December 5, 1999	Socorro	LINEAR	·	2.5 km	MPC · JPL
43099	1999 XO_{15}	—	December 5, 1999	Višnjan Observatory	K. Korlević	·	10 km	MPC · JPL
43100	1999 XV_{15}	—	December 6, 1999	Višnjan Observatory	K. Korlević	·	5.8 km	MPC · JPL

== 43101–43200 ==
back to top

Designation			Discovery			Properties		Ref
Permanent	Provisional	Named after	Date	Site	Discoverer(s)	Category	Diam.	Ref
43101	1999 XX_{18}	—	December 3, 1999	Socorro	LINEAR	·	2.6 km	MPC · JPL
43102	1999 XU_{19}	—	December 5, 1999	Socorro	LINEAR	·	5.3 km	MPC · JPL
43103	1999 XC_{21}	—	December 5, 1999	Socorro	LINEAR	·	3.3 km	MPC · JPL
43104	1999 XP_{21}	—	December 5, 1999	Socorro	LINEAR	·	3.8 km	MPC · JPL
43105	1999 XM_{22}	—	December 6, 1999	Socorro	LINEAR	·	3.3 km	MPC · JPL
43106	1999 XB_{26}	—	December 6, 1999	Socorro	LINEAR	EOS	5.4 km	MPC · JPL
43107	1999 XG_{26}	—	December 6, 1999	Socorro	LINEAR	·	5.7 km	MPC · JPL
43108	1999 XQ_{26}	—	December 6, 1999	Socorro	LINEAR	KOR	3.2 km	MPC · JPL
43109	1999 XP_{28}	—	December 6, 1999	Socorro	LINEAR	·	4.8 km	MPC · JPL
43110	1999 XH_{29}	—	December 6, 1999	Socorro	LINEAR	·	16 km	MPC · JPL
43111	1999 XD_{30}	—	December 6, 1999	Socorro	LINEAR	HYG	6.9 km	MPC · JPL
43112	1999 XK_{31}	—	December 6, 1999	Socorro	LINEAR	EOS	7.2 km	MPC · JPL
43113	1999 XN_{31}	—	December 6, 1999	Socorro	LINEAR	EOS	7.3 km	MPC · JPL
43114	1999 XR_{36}	—	December 7, 1999	Fountain Hills	C. W. Juels	·	7.6 km	MPC · JPL
43115	1999 XG_{39}	—	December 6, 1999	Socorro	LINEAR	ADE	4.7 km	MPC · JPL
43116	1999 XN_{39}	—	December 6, 1999	Socorro	LINEAR	·	6.4 km	MPC · JPL
43117	1999 XT_{42}	—	December 7, 1999	Socorro	LINEAR	·	2.7 km	MPC · JPL
43118	1999 XD_{43}	—	December 7, 1999	Socorro	LINEAR	EOS	5.3 km	MPC · JPL
43119	1999 XV_{44}	—	December 7, 1999	Socorro	LINEAR	HYG	8.1 km	MPC · JPL
43120	1999 XB_{49}	—	December 7, 1999	Socorro	LINEAR	·	3.3 km	MPC · JPL
43121	1999 XM_{49}	—	December 7, 1999	Socorro	LINEAR	KOR	3.8 km	MPC · JPL
43122	1999 XL_{50}	—	December 7, 1999	Socorro	LINEAR	·	2.2 km	MPC · JPL
43123	1999 XT_{50}	—	December 7, 1999	Socorro	LINEAR	RAF	4.7 km	MPC · JPL
43124	1999 XJ_{53}	—	December 7, 1999	Socorro	LINEAR	AST	6.4 km	MPC · JPL
43125	1999 XQ_{61}	—	December 7, 1999	Socorro	LINEAR	·	6.4 km	MPC · JPL
43126	1999 XL_{64}	—	December 7, 1999	Socorro	LINEAR	THM · fast	7.4 km	MPC · JPL
43127	1999 XD_{68}	—	December 7, 1999	Socorro	LINEAR	·	7.8 km	MPC · JPL
43128	1999 XM_{68}	—	December 7, 1999	Socorro	LINEAR	·	3.6 km	MPC · JPL
43129	1999 XY_{68}	—	December 7, 1999	Socorro	LINEAR	·	3.6 km	MPC · JPL
43130	1999 XZ_{68}	—	December 7, 1999	Socorro	LINEAR	·	6.3 km	MPC · JPL
43131	1999 XK_{72}	—	December 7, 1999	Socorro	LINEAR	·	3.8 km	MPC · JPL
43132	1999 XO_{73}	—	December 7, 1999	Socorro	LINEAR	·	5.4 km	MPC · JPL
43133	1999 XK_{76}	—	December 7, 1999	Socorro	LINEAR	·	6.4 km	MPC · JPL
43134	1999 XU_{77}	—	December 7, 1999	Socorro	LINEAR	·	8.6 km	MPC · JPL
43135	1999 XT_{82}	—	December 7, 1999	Socorro	LINEAR	·	7.7 km	MPC · JPL
43136	1999 XE_{85}	—	December 7, 1999	Socorro	LINEAR	·	6.1 km	MPC · JPL
43137	1999 XU_{85}	—	December 7, 1999	Socorro	LINEAR	·	10 km	MPC · JPL
43138	1999 XJ_{86}	—	December 7, 1999	Socorro	LINEAR	·	3.5 km	MPC · JPL
43139	1999 XM_{90}	—	December 7, 1999	Socorro	LINEAR	URS	18 km	MPC · JPL
43140	1999 XT_{90}	—	December 7, 1999	Socorro	LINEAR	MAR	4.8 km	MPC · JPL
43141	1999 XR_{91}	—	December 7, 1999	Socorro	LINEAR	·	4.9 km	MPC · JPL
43142	1999 XQ_{93}	—	December 7, 1999	Socorro	LINEAR	EUN	6.0 km	MPC · JPL
43143	1999 XA_{97}	—	December 7, 1999	Socorro	LINEAR	·	8.6 km	MPC · JPL
43144	1999 XD_{98}	—	December 7, 1999	Socorro	LINEAR	EUN	3.6 km	MPC · JPL
43145	1999 XT_{98}	—	December 7, 1999	Socorro	LINEAR	EOS	8.3 km	MPC · JPL
43146	1999 XN_{102}	—	December 7, 1999	Socorro	LINEAR	TEL	5.6 km	MPC · JPL
43147	1999 XO_{105}	—	December 8, 1999	Nachi-Katsuura	Shiozawa, H., T. Urata	(5)	4.6 km	MPC · JPL
43148	1999 XB_{106}	—	December 11, 1999	Oizumi	T. Kobayashi	·	6.6 km	MPC · JPL
43149	1999 XU_{107}	—	December 4, 1999	Catalina	CSS	·	3.4 km	MPC · JPL
43150	1999 XF_{109}	—	December 4, 1999	Catalina	CSS	·	3.0 km	MPC · JPL
43151	1999 XU_{114}	—	December 11, 1999	Socorro	LINEAR	·	4.8 km	MPC · JPL
43152	1999 XM_{115}	—	December 4, 1999	Catalina	CSS	LIX	16 km	MPC · JPL
43153	1999 XC_{118}	—	December 5, 1999	Catalina	CSS	PAD	6.9 km	MPC · JPL
43154	1999 XH_{118}	—	December 5, 1999	Catalina	CSS	·	3.0 km	MPC · JPL
43155	1999 XE_{120}	—	December 5, 1999	Catalina	CSS	EOS	6.3 km	MPC · JPL
43156	1999 XF_{120}	—	December 5, 1999	Catalina	CSS	·	5.7 km	MPC · JPL
43157	1999 XT_{120}	—	December 5, 1999	Catalina	CSS	PHO	3.7 km	MPC · JPL
43158	1999 XK_{121}	—	December 5, 1999	Catalina	CSS	NYS	2.8 km	MPC · JPL
43159	1999 XP_{121}	—	December 5, 1999	Catalina	CSS	KOR	3.3 km	MPC · JPL
43160	1999 XY_{122}	—	December 7, 1999	Catalina	CSS	EOS	7.2 km	MPC · JPL
43161	1999 XW_{123}	—	December 7, 1999	Catalina	CSS	EUN · slow	4.4 km	MPC · JPL
43162	1999 XE_{126}	—	December 7, 1999	Catalina	CSS	slow	7.5 km	MPC · JPL
43163	1999 XB_{127}	—	December 7, 1999	Catalina	CSS	·	9.3 km	MPC · JPL
43164	1999 XJ_{154}	—	December 8, 1999	Socorro	LINEAR	EOS	4.4 km	MPC · JPL
43165	1999 XA_{156}	—	December 8, 1999	Socorro	LINEAR	·	3.1 km	MPC · JPL
43166	1999 XO_{156}	—	December 8, 1999	Socorro	LINEAR	·	6.6 km	MPC · JPL
43167	1999 XY_{157}	—	December 8, 1999	Socorro	LINEAR	·	3.7 km	MPC · JPL
43168	1999 XO_{161}	—	December 13, 1999	Socorro	LINEAR	EUN	4.1 km	MPC · JPL
43169	1999 XE_{167}	—	December 10, 1999	Socorro	LINEAR	EUN	5.1 km	MPC · JPL
43170	1999 XH_{171}	—	December 10, 1999	Socorro	LINEAR	·	4.7 km	MPC · JPL
43171	1999 XF_{172}	—	December 10, 1999	Socorro	LINEAR	·	10 km	MPC · JPL
43172	1999 XV_{172}	—	December 10, 1999	Socorro	LINEAR	·	12 km	MPC · JPL
43173	1999 XK_{177}	—	December 10, 1999	Socorro	LINEAR	URS	18 km	MPC · JPL
43174	1999 XF_{180}	—	December 10, 1999	Socorro	LINEAR	·	5.5 km	MPC · JPL
43175	1999 XY_{189}	—	December 12, 1999	Socorro	LINEAR	·	2.7 km	MPC · JPL
43176	1999 XM_{196}	—	December 12, 1999	Socorro	LINEAR	(43176)	8.2 km	MPC · JPL
43177	1999 XQ_{198}	—	December 12, 1999	Socorro	LINEAR	·	6.4 km	MPC · JPL
43178	1999 XH_{201}	—	December 12, 1999	Socorro	LINEAR	·	6.6 km	MPC · JPL
43179	1999 XL_{204}	—	December 12, 1999	Socorro	LINEAR	URS	12 km	MPC · JPL
43180	1999 XT_{206}	—	December 12, 1999	Socorro	LINEAR	·	11 km	MPC · JPL
43181	1999 XY_{206}	—	December 12, 1999	Socorro	LINEAR	·	13 km	MPC · JPL
43182	1999 XG_{212}	—	December 14, 1999	Socorro	LINEAR	·	2.9 km	MPC · JPL
43183	1999 XK_{213}	—	December 14, 1999	Socorro	LINEAR	·	7.0 km	MPC · JPL
43184	1999 XD_{214}	—	December 14, 1999	Socorro	LINEAR	EOS	5.1 km	MPC · JPL
43185	1999 XK_{222}	—	December 15, 1999	Socorro	LINEAR	·	4.6 km	MPC · JPL
43186	1999 XQ_{230}	—	December 7, 1999	Anderson Mesa	LONEOS	·	2.8 km	MPC · JPL
43187	1999 XF_{233}	—	December 2, 1999	Anderson Mesa	LONEOS	·	3.4 km	MPC · JPL
43188 Zouxiaoduan	1999 XP_{234}	Zouxiaoduan	December 3, 1999	Anderson Mesa	LONEOS	PAD	6.4 km	MPC · JPL
43189	1999 XR_{240}	—	December 7, 1999	Socorro	LINEAR	·	4.0 km	MPC · JPL
43190	1999 XR_{241}	—	December 13, 1999	Anderson Mesa	LONEOS	·	4.2 km	MPC · JPL
43191	1999 YM_{5}	—	December 29, 1999	Črni Vrh	Mikuž, H.	·	7.3 km	MPC · JPL
43192	1999 YG_{13}	—	December 30, 1999	Anderson Mesa	LONEOS	·	4.7 km	MPC · JPL
43193 Secinaro	2000 AW_{4}	Secinaro	January 1, 2000	San Marcello	L. Tesi, A. Boattini	·	6.8 km	MPC · JPL
43194	2000 AJ_{6}	—	January 4, 2000	Prescott	P. G. Comba	THM	8.7 km	MPC · JPL
43195	2000 AP_{13}	—	January 3, 2000	Socorro	LINEAR	·	8.4 km	MPC · JPL
43196	2000 AH_{32}	—	January 3, 2000	Socorro	LINEAR	·	2.4 km	MPC · JPL
43197	2000 AU_{44}	—	January 5, 2000	Kitt Peak	Spacewatch	MAS	1.7 km	MPC · JPL
43198	2000 AD_{62}	—	January 4, 2000	Socorro	LINEAR	EOS	6.1 km	MPC · JPL
43199	2000 AJ_{68}	—	January 5, 2000	Socorro	LINEAR	·	16 km	MPC · JPL
43200	2000 AO_{68}	—	January 5, 2000	Socorro	LINEAR	·	2.2 km	MPC · JPL

== 43201–43300 ==
back to top

Designation			Discovery			Properties		Ref
Permanent	Provisional	Named after	Date	Site	Discoverer(s)	Category	Diam.	Ref
43201	2000 AT_{69}	—	January 5, 2000	Socorro	LINEAR	·	3.5 km	MPC · JPL
43202	2000 AQ_{70}	—	January 5, 2000	Socorro	LINEAR	·	16 km	MPC · JPL
43203	2000 AV_{70}	—	January 5, 2000	Socorro	LINEAR	·	4.5 km	MPC · JPL
43204	2000 AA_{71}	—	January 5, 2000	Socorro	LINEAR	·	10 km	MPC · JPL
43205	2000 AV_{72}	—	January 5, 2000	Socorro	LINEAR	·	9.2 km	MPC · JPL
43206	2000 AJ_{78}	—	January 5, 2000	Socorro	LINEAR	TEL	4.5 km	MPC · JPL
43207	2000 AJ_{79}	—	January 5, 2000	Socorro	LINEAR	·	3.8 km	MPC · JPL
43208	2000 AW_{98}	—	January 5, 2000	Socorro	LINEAR	TIR	7.0 km	MPC · JPL
43209	2000 AP_{101}	—	January 5, 2000	Socorro	LINEAR	·	2.9 km	MPC · JPL
43210	2000 AS_{101}	—	January 5, 2000	Socorro	LINEAR	·	2.9 km	MPC · JPL
43211	2000 AR_{105}	—	January 5, 2000	Socorro	LINEAR	EUN	3.4 km	MPC · JPL
43212 Katosawao	2000 AL_{113}	Katosawao	January 5, 2000	Socorro	LINEAR	L4 · ERY	19 km	MPC · JPL
43213	2000 AC_{132}	—	January 3, 2000	Socorro	LINEAR	·	8.7 km	MPC · JPL
43214	2000 AQ_{135}	—	January 4, 2000	Socorro	LINEAR	HYG	8.8 km	MPC · JPL
43215	2000 AN_{138}	—	January 5, 2000	Socorro	LINEAR	V	2.7 km	MPC · JPL
43216	2000 AB_{139}	—	January 5, 2000	Socorro	LINEAR	V	2.2 km	MPC · JPL
43217	2000 AE_{139}	—	January 5, 2000	Socorro	LINEAR	V	2.2 km	MPC · JPL
43218	2000 AE_{143}	—	January 5, 2000	Socorro	LINEAR	EOS	9.1 km	MPC · JPL
43219	2000 AC_{150}	—	January 7, 2000	Socorro	LINEAR	EOS	4.1 km	MPC · JPL
43220	2000 AR_{150}	—	January 8, 2000	Socorro	LINEAR	·	8.4 km	MPC · JPL
43221	2000 AJ_{151}	—	January 8, 2000	Socorro	LINEAR	·	3.1 km	MPC · JPL
43222	2000 AG_{155}	—	January 3, 2000	Socorro	LINEAR	MAS	3.0 km	MPC · JPL
43223	2000 AE_{162}	—	January 4, 2000	Socorro	LINEAR	·	2.4 km	MPC · JPL
43224 Tonypensa	2000 AP_{165}	Tonypensa	January 8, 2000	Socorro	LINEAR	EUN	4.0 km	MPC · JPL
43225	2000 AW_{165}	—	January 8, 2000	Socorro	LINEAR	·	8.4 km	MPC · JPL
43226	2000 AM_{166}	—	January 8, 2000	Socorro	LINEAR	·	7.7 km	MPC · JPL
43227	2000 AR_{166}	—	January 8, 2000	Socorro	LINEAR	·	14 km	MPC · JPL
43228	2000 AH_{169}	—	January 7, 2000	Socorro	LINEAR	EOS	5.7 km	MPC · JPL
43229	2000 AD_{174}	—	January 7, 2000	Socorro	LINEAR	·	10 km	MPC · JPL
43230	2000 AX_{175}	—	January 7, 2000	Socorro	LINEAR	·	9.9 km	MPC · JPL
43231	2000 AU_{177}	—	January 7, 2000	Socorro	LINEAR	·	18 km	MPC · JPL
43232	2000 AH_{178}	—	January 7, 2000	Socorro	LINEAR	·	5.9 km	MPC · JPL
43233	2000 AQ_{179}	—	January 7, 2000	Socorro	LINEAR	EOS	5.7 km	MPC · JPL
43234	2000 AN_{186}	—	January 8, 2000	Socorro	LINEAR	·	3.9 km	MPC · JPL
43235	2000 AX_{197}	—	January 8, 2000	Socorro	LINEAR	·	6.7 km	MPC · JPL
43236	2000 AB_{199}	—	January 8, 2000	Socorro	LINEAR	·	12 km	MPC · JPL
43237	2000 AB_{204}	—	January 6, 2000	Ondřejov	P. Kušnirák	EOS	4.5 km	MPC · JPL
43238	2000 AT_{233}	—	January 5, 2000	Socorro	LINEAR	·	2.4 km	MPC · JPL
43239	2000 AK_{238}	—	January 6, 2000	Kitt Peak	Spacewatch	·	6.6 km	MPC · JPL
43240	2000 AP_{240}	—	January 7, 2000	Socorro	LINEAR	·	9.4 km	MPC · JPL
43241	2000 AB_{244}	—	January 8, 2000	Socorro	LINEAR	·	3.3 km	MPC · JPL
43242	2000 AK_{244}	—	January 8, 2000	Anderson Mesa	LONEOS	HNS	3.8 km	MPC · JPL
43243	2000 AB_{253}	—	January 7, 2000	Kitt Peak	Spacewatch	THM	5.4 km	MPC · JPL
43244	2000 AR_{253}	—	January 7, 2000	Kitt Peak	Spacewatch	THM	8.0 km	MPC · JPL
43245	2000 BB_{15}	—	January 31, 2000	Oizumi	T. Kobayashi	·	7.5 km	MPC · JPL
43246	2000 BB_{18}	—	January 30, 2000	Socorro	LINEAR	·	3.6 km	MPC · JPL
43247	2000 BV_{25}	—	January 30, 2000	Socorro	LINEAR	·	6.6 km	MPC · JPL
43248	2000 BD_{26}	—	January 29, 2000	Kitt Peak	Spacewatch	GEF	4.4 km	MPC · JPL
43249	2000 BQ_{29}	—	January 29, 2000	Socorro	LINEAR	·	5.4 km	MPC · JPL
43250	2000 CG_{3}	—	February 2, 2000	Socorro	LINEAR	·	3.8 km	MPC · JPL
43251	2000 CX_{4}	—	February 2, 2000	Socorro	LINEAR	·	14 km	MPC · JPL
43252	2000 CB_{10}	—	February 2, 2000	Socorro	LINEAR	THM	7.2 km	MPC · JPL
43253	2000 CY_{18}	—	February 2, 2000	Socorro	LINEAR	·	3.5 km	MPC · JPL
43254	2000 CE_{35}	—	February 2, 2000	Socorro	LINEAR	·	4.9 km	MPC · JPL
43255	2000 CT_{62}	—	February 2, 2000	Socorro	LINEAR	·	4.3 km	MPC · JPL
43256	2000 CF_{82}	—	February 4, 2000	Socorro	LINEAR	KOR	3.7 km	MPC · JPL
43257	2000 CO_{87}	—	February 4, 2000	Socorro	LINEAR	V	1.8 km	MPC · JPL
43258	2000 CH_{91}	—	February 6, 2000	Socorro	LINEAR	PAD	7.1 km	MPC · JPL
43259 Wangzhenyi	2000 CK_{104}	Wangzhenyi	February 8, 2000	Xinglong	SCAP	·	7.9 km	MPC · JPL
43260	2000 CV_{116}	—	February 3, 2000	Socorro	LINEAR	VER	11 km	MPC · JPL
43261	2000 DF_{3}	—	February 27, 2000	Oizumi	T. Kobayashi	·	6.6 km	MPC · JPL
43262	2000 DL_{4}	—	February 28, 2000	Socorro	LINEAR	(1298)	10 km	MPC · JPL
43263	2000 DM_{19}	—	February 29, 2000	Socorro	LINEAR	KOR	3.6 km	MPC · JPL
43264	2000 DZ_{52}	—	February 29, 2000	Socorro	LINEAR	·	1.7 km	MPC · JPL
43265	2000 DX_{54}	—	February 29, 2000	Socorro	LINEAR	·	1.2 km	MPC · JPL
43266	2000 DZ_{83}	—	February 28, 2000	Socorro	LINEAR	·	6.6 km	MPC · JPL
43267	2000 DL_{84}	—	February 28, 2000	Socorro	LINEAR	HYG	8.2 km	MPC · JPL
43268	2000 DP_{93}	—	February 28, 2000	Socorro	LINEAR	·	2.9 km	MPC · JPL
43269	2000 DO_{98}	—	February 29, 2000	Socorro	LINEAR	EOS	6.5 km	MPC · JPL
43270	2000 ED_{9}	—	March 3, 2000	Socorro	LINEAR	·	4.1 km	MPC · JPL
43271	2000 EQ_{13}	—	March 5, 2000	Socorro	LINEAR	PAD	7.4 km	MPC · JPL
43272	2000 ED_{34}	—	March 5, 2000	Socorro	LINEAR	·	3.5 km	MPC · JPL
43273	2000 EL_{41}	—	March 8, 2000	Socorro	LINEAR	·	1.7 km	MPC · JPL
43274	2000 ER_{56}	—	March 8, 2000	Socorro	LINEAR	NYS	3.9 km	MPC · JPL
43275	2000 ED_{95}	—	March 9, 2000	Socorro	LINEAR	·	7.2 km	MPC · JPL
43276	2000 EE_{95}	—	March 9, 2000	Socorro	LINEAR	·	3.6 km	MPC · JPL
43277	2000 EZ_{96}	—	March 10, 2000	Socorro	LINEAR	slow	12 km	MPC · JPL
43278	2000 ES_{109}	—	March 8, 2000	Haleakala	NEAT	·	5.2 km	MPC · JPL
43279	2000 EY_{112}	—	March 9, 2000	Socorro	LINEAR	KOR	3.7 km	MPC · JPL
43280	2000 EY_{131}	—	March 11, 2000	Anderson Mesa	LONEOS	·	1.6 km	MPC · JPL
43281	2000 EL_{137}	—	March 7, 2000	Socorro	LINEAR	·	3.3 km	MPC · JPL
43282 Dougbock	2000 EB_{140}	Dougbock	March 14, 2000	Catalina	CSS	·	2.9 km	MPC · JPL
43283 Robinbock	2000 EC_{143}	Robinbock	March 3, 2000	Catalina	CSS	·	7.3 km	MPC · JPL
43284	2000 ED_{151}	—	March 5, 2000	Haleakala	NEAT	·	2.9 km	MPC · JPL
43285	2000 ED_{156}	—	March 9, 2000	Socorro	LINEAR	·	3.2 km	MPC · JPL
43286	2000 EA_{158}	—	March 12, 2000	Anderson Mesa	LONEOS	fast?	7.2 km	MPC · JPL
43287	2000 FJ_{3}	—	March 28, 2000	Socorro	LINEAR	EUN	4.6 km	MPC · JPL
43288	2000 FB_{16}	—	March 28, 2000	Socorro	LINEAR	(2076) · slow	4.1 km	MPC · JPL
43289	2000 FE_{44}	—	March 29, 2000	Socorro	LINEAR	·	3.9 km	MPC · JPL
43290	2000 FV_{48}	—	March 30, 2000	Socorro	LINEAR	·	9.9 km	MPC · JPL
43291	2000 FY_{48}	—	March 30, 2000	Socorro	LINEAR	EOS	6.9 km	MPC · JPL
43292	2000 FP_{49}	—	March 30, 2000	Socorro	LINEAR	·	4.7 km	MPC · JPL
43293 Banting	2000 GU_{1}	Banting	April 1, 2000	Reedy Creek	J. Broughton	·	10 km	MPC · JPL
43294	2000 GY_{4}	—	April 2, 2000	Socorro	LINEAR	·	4.1 km	MPC · JPL
43295	2000 GZ_{35}	—	April 5, 2000	Socorro	LINEAR	·	2.9 km	MPC · JPL
43296	2000 GM_{53}	—	April 5, 2000	Socorro	LINEAR	·	2.5 km	MPC · JPL
43297	2000 GB_{64}	—	April 5, 2000	Socorro	LINEAR	·	1.8 km	MPC · JPL
43298	2000 GL_{67}	—	April 5, 2000	Socorro	LINEAR	GEF	3.4 km	MPC · JPL
43299	2000 GD_{73}	—	April 5, 2000	Socorro	LINEAR	·	1.9 km	MPC · JPL
43300	2000 GZ_{87}	—	April 4, 2000	Socorro	LINEAR	V	2.4 km	MPC · JPL

== 43301–43400 ==
back to top

Designation			Discovery			Properties		Ref
Permanent	Provisional	Named after	Date	Site	Discoverer(s)	Category	Diam.	Ref
43301	2000 GL_{108}	—	April 7, 2000	Socorro	LINEAR	·	4.5 km	MPC · JPL
43302	2000 GE_{114}	—	April 7, 2000	Socorro	LINEAR	·	2.7 km	MPC · JPL
43303	2000 GO_{133}	—	April 7, 2000	Socorro	LINEAR	·	6.9 km	MPC · JPL
43304	2000 GZ_{133}	—	April 7, 2000	Socorro	LINEAR	·	4.6 km	MPC · JPL
43305 Camillebibles	2000 GH_{142}	Camillebibles	April 7, 2000	Anderson Mesa	LONEOS	·	3.9 km	MPC · JPL
43306	2000 GW_{157}	—	April 7, 2000	Socorro	LINEAR	·	4.2 km	MPC · JPL
43307	2000 HU_{21}	—	April 28, 2000	Socorro	LINEAR	NYS ·	5.6 km	MPC · JPL
43308	2000 HY_{26}	—	April 27, 2000	Socorro	LINEAR	·	2.1 km	MPC · JPL
43309	2000 HH_{34}	—	April 25, 2000	Anderson Mesa	LONEOS	·	1.7 km	MPC · JPL
43310	2000 HN_{37}	—	April 28, 2000	Socorro	LINEAR	PHO	3.6 km	MPC · JPL
43311	2000 HH_{55}	—	April 29, 2000	Socorro	LINEAR	·	3.2 km	MPC · JPL
43312	2000 HB_{68}	—	April 27, 2000	Socorro	LINEAR	·	1.7 km	MPC · JPL
43313	2000 JW	—	May 1, 2000	Socorro	LINEAR	·	3.7 km	MPC · JPL
43314	2000 JC_{12}	—	May 5, 2000	Socorro	LINEAR	·	4.2 km	MPC · JPL
43315	2000 JB_{18}	—	May 6, 2000	Socorro	LINEAR	NYS	2.4 km	MPC · JPL
43316	2000 JV_{19}	—	May 6, 2000	Socorro	LINEAR	·	3.8 km	MPC · JPL
43317	2000 JY_{21}	—	May 6, 2000	Socorro	LINEAR	NYS ·	4.9 km	MPC · JPL
43318	2000 JO_{37}	—	May 7, 2000	Socorro	LINEAR	·	4.2 km	MPC · JPL
43319	2000 JA_{38}	—	May 7, 2000	Socorro	LINEAR	PHO	2.9 km	MPC · JPL
43320	2000 JG_{44}	—	May 7, 2000	Socorro	LINEAR	·	3.1 km	MPC · JPL
43321	2000 JR_{52}	—	May 9, 2000	Socorro	LINEAR	·	3.7 km	MPC · JPL
43322	2000 JQ_{69}	—	May 2, 2000	Socorro	LINEAR	·	3.8 km	MPC · JPL
43323	2000 JY_{72}	—	May 2, 2000	Anderson Mesa	LONEOS	·	2.0 km	MPC · JPL
43324	2000 KQ_{15}	—	May 28, 2000	Socorro	LINEAR	·	4.7 km	MPC · JPL
43325	2000 KY_{50}	—	May 29, 2000	Socorro	LINEAR	·	5.0 km	MPC · JPL
43326	2000 KH_{73}	—	May 28, 2000	Anderson Mesa	LONEOS	·	2.1 km	MPC · JPL
43327	2000 LH_{3}	—	June 4, 2000	Socorro	LINEAR	GEF	3.7 km	MPC · JPL
43328	2000 OU_{15}	—	July 23, 2000	Socorro	LINEAR	·	5.0 km	MPC · JPL
43329	2000 OU_{25}	—	July 23, 2000	Socorro	LINEAR	·	2.1 km	MPC · JPL
43330	2000 OQ_{30}	—	July 30, 2000	Socorro	LINEAR	·	2.4 km	MPC · JPL
43331	2000 PS_{6}	—	August 3, 2000	Socorro	LINEAR	H	1.4 km	MPC · JPL
43332	2000 QG_{6}	—	August 24, 2000	Višnjan Observatory	K. Korlević, M. Jurić	PHO	3.0 km	MPC · JPL
43333	2000 QY_{64}	—	August 28, 2000	Socorro	LINEAR	·	3.1 km	MPC · JPL
43334	2000 QM_{117}	—	August 28, 2000	Socorro	LINEAR	H	1.7 km	MPC · JPL
43335	2000 QX_{127}	—	August 24, 2000	Socorro	LINEAR	MAS	2.9 km	MPC · JPL
43336	2000 QT_{148}	—	August 31, 2000	Socorro	LINEAR	·	2.8 km	MPC · JPL
43337	2000 RG_{9}	—	September 1, 2000	Socorro	LINEAR	·	5.8 km	MPC · JPL
43338	2000 RA_{10}	—	September 1, 2000	Socorro	LINEAR	·	3.6 km	MPC · JPL
43339	2000 RM_{10}	—	September 1, 2000	Socorro	LINEAR	·	2.6 km	MPC · JPL
43340	2000 RX_{46}	—	September 3, 2000	Socorro	LINEAR	·	6.6 km	MPC · JPL
43341	2000 RK_{62}	—	September 1, 2000	Socorro	LINEAR	MAR	5.6 km	MPC · JPL
43342	2000 RO_{67}	—	September 1, 2000	Socorro	LINEAR	·	12 km	MPC · JPL
43343	2000 RY_{81}	—	September 1, 2000	Socorro	LINEAR	TIR	10 km	MPC · JPL
43344	2000 RR_{85}	—	September 2, 2000	Anderson Mesa	LONEOS	V	2.0 km	MPC · JPL
43345	2000 RB_{88}	—	September 2, 2000	Haleakala	NEAT	·	3.3 km	MPC · JPL
43346	2000 RT_{103}	—	September 6, 2000	Socorro	LINEAR	·	8.1 km	MPC · JPL
43347	2000 SM_{52}	—	September 23, 2000	Socorro	LINEAR	ADE	6.8 km	MPC · JPL
43348	2000 SK_{108}	—	September 24, 2000	Socorro	LINEAR	NYS	1.6 km	MPC · JPL
43349	2000 SK_{160}	—	September 27, 2000	Socorro	LINEAR	·	4.9 km	MPC · JPL
43350	2000 SG_{161}	—	September 27, 2000	Socorro	LINEAR	·	2.1 km	MPC · JPL
43351	2000 SX_{169}	—	September 24, 2000	Socorro	LINEAR	·	2.2 km	MPC · JPL
43352	2000 SH_{265}	—	September 26, 2000	Socorro	LINEAR	·	2.8 km	MPC · JPL
43353	2000 SJ_{275}	—	September 28, 2000	Socorro	LINEAR	PHO	3.6 km	MPC · JPL
43354	2000 SZ_{278}	—	September 30, 2000	Socorro	LINEAR	·	17 km	MPC · JPL
43355	2000 SY_{293}	—	September 27, 2000	Socorro	LINEAR	PHO	5.7 km	MPC · JPL
43356	2000 TJ_{29}	—	October 3, 2000	Socorro	LINEAR	·	9.1 km	MPC · JPL
43357	2000 UM_{19}	—	October 24, 2000	Socorro	LINEAR	H	1.7 km	MPC · JPL
43358	2000 UQ_{32}	—	October 29, 2000	Kitt Peak	Spacewatch	KOR	3.5 km	MPC · JPL
43359	2000 UF_{41}	—	October 24, 2000	Socorro	LINEAR	·	2.5 km	MPC · JPL
43360	2000 UU_{49}	—	October 24, 2000	Socorro	LINEAR	·	2.8 km	MPC · JPL
43361	2000 UA_{50}	—	October 24, 2000	Socorro	LINEAR	·	2.4 km	MPC · JPL
43362	2000 VK_{2}	—	November 1, 2000	Socorro	LINEAR	·	2.8 km	MPC · JPL
43363	2000 VG_{35}	—	November 1, 2000	Socorro	LINEAR	·	3.9 km	MPC · JPL
43364	2000 VZ_{35}	—	November 1, 2000	Socorro	LINEAR	·	2.6 km	MPC · JPL
43365	2000 VA_{36}	—	November 1, 2000	Socorro	LINEAR	·	2.3 km	MPC · JPL
43366	2000 VZ_{37}	—	November 1, 2000	Socorro	LINEAR	NYS	5.4 km	MPC · JPL
43367	2000 VL_{47}	—	November 3, 2000	Socorro	LINEAR	MAR	3.4 km	MPC · JPL
43368 Rodrigoleiva	2000 VZ_{62}	Rodrigoleiva	November 14, 2000	Anderson Mesa	LONEOS	PHO	3.2 km	MPC · JPL
43369	2000 WP_{3}	—	November 17, 2000	Socorro	LINEAR	H	1.8 km	MPC · JPL
43370	2000 WD_{5}	—	November 19, 2000	Socorro	LINEAR	·	5.1 km	MPC · JPL
43371	2000 WJ_{8}	—	November 20, 2000	Socorro	LINEAR	·	2.1 km	MPC · JPL
43372	2000 WO_{15}	—	November 20, 2000	Socorro	LINEAR	PHO	4.6 km	MPC · JPL
43373	2000 WC_{17}	—	November 21, 2000	Socorro	LINEAR	SUL	6.7 km	MPC · JPL
43374	2000 WT_{33}	—	November 20, 2000	Socorro	LINEAR	·	2.1 km	MPC · JPL
43375	2000 WE_{36}	—	November 20, 2000	Socorro	LINEAR	·	2.5 km	MPC · JPL
43376	2000 WV_{36}	—	November 20, 2000	Socorro	LINEAR	·	3.6 km	MPC · JPL
43377	2000 WF_{41}	—	November 20, 2000	Socorro	LINEAR	·	3.5 km	MPC · JPL
43378	2000 WM_{43}	—	November 21, 2000	Socorro	LINEAR	·	2.4 km	MPC · JPL
43379	2000 WN_{43}	—	November 21, 2000	Socorro	LINEAR	·	3.0 km	MPC · JPL
43380	2000 WJ_{44}	—	November 21, 2000	Socorro	LINEAR	·	2.4 km	MPC · JPL
43381	2000 WQ_{47}	—	November 21, 2000	Socorro	LINEAR	·	1.9 km	MPC · JPL
43382	2000 WJ_{49}	—	November 21, 2000	Socorro	LINEAR	·	10 km	MPC · JPL
43383	2000 WQ_{52}	—	November 27, 2000	Kitt Peak	Spacewatch	·	2.2 km	MPC · JPL
43384	2000 WP_{54}	—	November 20, 2000	Socorro	LINEAR	·	3.0 km	MPC · JPL
43385	2000 WQ_{54}	—	November 20, 2000	Socorro	LINEAR	V	2.1 km	MPC · JPL
43386	2000 WJ_{57}	—	November 21, 2000	Socorro	LINEAR	NYS	3.2 km	MPC · JPL
43387	2000 WF_{58}	—	November 21, 2000	Socorro	LINEAR	·	2.5 km	MPC · JPL
43388	2000 WA_{61}	—	November 21, 2000	Socorro	LINEAR	V	2.5 km	MPC · JPL
43389	2000 WP_{61}	—	November 21, 2000	Socorro	LINEAR	·	2.1 km	MPC · JPL
43390	2000 WF_{62}	—	November 26, 2000	Socorro	LINEAR	CYB · slow	27 km	MPC · JPL
43391	2000 WT_{62}	—	November 28, 2000	Fountain Hills	C. W. Juels	PHO	4.4 km	MPC · JPL
43392	2000 WF_{86}	—	November 20, 2000	Socorro	LINEAR	·	4.2 km	MPC · JPL
43393	2000 WL_{86}	—	November 20, 2000	Socorro	LINEAR	·	2.1 km	MPC · JPL
43394	2000 WM_{87}	—	November 20, 2000	Socorro	LINEAR	·	5.2 km	MPC · JPL
43395	2000 WE_{88}	—	November 20, 2000	Socorro	LINEAR	·	3.5 km	MPC · JPL
43396	2000 WN_{89}	—	November 21, 2000	Socorro	LINEAR	·	2.3 km	MPC · JPL
43397	2000 WQ_{91}	—	November 21, 2000	Socorro	LINEAR	·	3.0 km	MPC · JPL
43398	2000 WS_{93}	—	November 21, 2000	Socorro	LINEAR	·	4.1 km	MPC · JPL
43399	2000 WO_{95}	—	November 21, 2000	Socorro	LINEAR	·	5.4 km	MPC · JPL
43400	2000 WE_{97}	—	November 21, 2000	Socorro	LINEAR	·	2.3 km	MPC · JPL

== 43401–43500 ==
back to top

Designation			Discovery			Properties		Ref
Permanent	Provisional	Named after	Date	Site	Discoverer(s)	Category	Diam.	Ref
43401	2000 WE_{116}	—	November 20, 2000	Socorro	LINEAR	·	3.2 km	MPC · JPL
43402	2000 WO_{117}	—	November 20, 2000	Socorro	LINEAR	V	1.9 km	MPC · JPL
43403	2000 WY_{122}	—	November 29, 2000	Socorro	LINEAR	·	2.8 km	MPC · JPL
43404	2000 WT_{126}	—	November 16, 2000	Kitt Peak	Spacewatch	·	3.5 km	MPC · JPL
43405	2000 WX_{129}	—	November 19, 2000	Socorro	LINEAR	PHO	3.4 km	MPC · JPL
43406	2000 WR_{135}	—	November 19, 2000	Socorro	LINEAR	·	3.7 km	MPC · JPL
43407	2000 WX_{135}	—	November 20, 2000	Socorro	LINEAR	·	2.8 km	MPC · JPL
43408	2000 WW_{137}	—	November 20, 2000	Socorro	LINEAR	·	3.5 km	MPC · JPL
43409	2000 WY_{147}	—	November 28, 2000	Kitt Peak	Spacewatch	·	3.2 km	MPC · JPL
43410	2000 WB_{148}	—	November 28, 2000	Kitt Peak	Spacewatch	·	2.2 km	MPC · JPL
43411	2000 WN_{153}	—	November 29, 2000	Socorro	LINEAR	MAR	3.1 km	MPC · JPL
43412	2000 WH_{158}	—	November 30, 2000	Socorro	LINEAR	V	1.6 km	MPC · JPL
43413	2000 WJ_{158}	—	November 30, 2000	Socorro	LINEAR	·	1.5 km	MPC · JPL
43414 Sfair	2000 WS_{168}	Sfair	November 25, 2000	Anderson Mesa	LONEOS	·	2.3 km	MPC · JPL
43415	2000 WW_{168}	—	November 25, 2000	Anderson Mesa	LONEOS	·	2.9 km	MPC · JPL
43416	2000 WA_{169}	—	November 25, 2000	Anderson Mesa	LONEOS	EUN	3.7 km	MPC · JPL
43417	2000 WE_{169}	—	November 25, 2000	Anderson Mesa	LONEOS	·	2.4 km	MPC · JPL
43418	2000 XP_{7}	—	December 1, 2000	Socorro	LINEAR	·	4.3 km	MPC · JPL
43419	2000 XK_{11}	—	December 1, 2000	Socorro	LINEAR	HNS	3.6 km	MPC · JPL
43420	2000 XR_{22}	—	December 4, 2000	Socorro	LINEAR	·	2.4 km	MPC · JPL
43421	2000 XN_{27}	—	December 4, 2000	Socorro	LINEAR	PHO	4.8 km	MPC · JPL
43422	2000 XA_{30}	—	December 4, 2000	Socorro	LINEAR	V	1.6 km	MPC · JPL
43423	2000 XQ_{41}	—	December 5, 2000	Socorro	LINEAR	HNS	3.4 km	MPC · JPL
43424	2000 YF_{5}	—	December 20, 2000	Socorro	LINEAR	PHO	3.6 km	MPC · JPL
43425	2000 YC_{6}	—	December 20, 2000	Socorro	LINEAR	·	2.1 km	MPC · JPL
43426	2000 YD_{6}	—	December 20, 2000	Socorro	LINEAR	·	3.0 km	MPC · JPL
43427	2000 YS_{12}	—	December 23, 2000	Desert Beaver	W. K. Y. Yeung	·	7.4 km	MPC · JPL
43428	2000 YT_{17}	—	December 28, 2000	Bisei SG Center	BATTeRS	·	3.0 km	MPC · JPL
43429	2000 YU_{19}	—	December 22, 2000	Haleakala	NEAT	·	4.4 km	MPC · JPL
43430	2000 YA_{23}	—	December 28, 2000	Kitt Peak	Spacewatch	·	7.2 km	MPC · JPL
43431	2000 YZ_{32}	—	December 30, 2000	Socorro	LINEAR	·	2.6 km	MPC · JPL
43432	2000 YL_{35}	—	December 30, 2000	Socorro	LINEAR	·	2.3 km	MPC · JPL
43433	2000 YW_{35}	—	December 30, 2000	Socorro	LINEAR	·	3.1 km	MPC · JPL
43434	2000 YX_{35}	—	December 30, 2000	Socorro	LINEAR	·	3.9 km	MPC · JPL
43435	2000 YV_{36}	—	December 30, 2000	Socorro	LINEAR	·	3.4 km	MPC · JPL
43436 Ansschut	2000 YD_{42}	Ansschut	December 30, 2000	Socorro	LINEAR	L4	20 km	MPC · JPL
43437	2000 YL_{47}	—	December 30, 2000	Socorro	LINEAR	·	2.7 km	MPC · JPL
43438	2000 YP_{49}	—	December 30, 2000	Socorro	LINEAR	·	6.7 km	MPC · JPL
43439	2000 YX_{54}	—	December 30, 2000	Socorro	LINEAR	(5)	2.5 km	MPC · JPL
43440	2000 YT_{60}	—	December 30, 2000	Socorro	LINEAR	·	1.9 km	MPC · JPL
43441	2000 YS_{61}	—	December 30, 2000	Socorro	LINEAR	·	3.7 km	MPC · JPL
43442	2000 YX_{62}	—	December 30, 2000	Socorro	LINEAR	·	3.0 km	MPC · JPL
43443	2000 YY_{62}	—	December 30, 2000	Socorro	LINEAR	·	2.3 km	MPC · JPL
43444	2000 YC_{72}	—	December 30, 2000	Socorro	LINEAR	·	2.2 km	MPC · JPL
43445	2000 YM_{74}	—	December 30, 2000	Socorro	LINEAR	·	3.1 km	MPC · JPL
43446	2000 YB_{75}	—	December 30, 2000	Socorro	LINEAR	V	1.9 km	MPC · JPL
43447	2000 YF_{76}	—	December 30, 2000	Socorro	LINEAR	·	3.9 km	MPC · JPL
43448	2000 YM_{79}	—	December 30, 2000	Socorro	LINEAR	NYS	3.3 km	MPC · JPL
43449	2000 YC_{83}	—	December 30, 2000	Socorro	LINEAR	·	3.0 km	MPC · JPL
43450	2000 YX_{91}	—	December 30, 2000	Socorro	LINEAR	·	3.0 km	MPC · JPL
43451	2000 YH_{96}	—	December 30, 2000	Socorro	LINEAR	·	1.8 km	MPC · JPL
43452	2000 YE_{99}	—	December 30, 2000	Socorro	LINEAR	·	2.2 km	MPC · JPL
43453	2000 YT_{100}	—	December 31, 2000	Haleakala	NEAT	·	6.8 km	MPC · JPL
43454	2000 YD_{102}	—	December 28, 2000	Socorro	LINEAR	V	1.9 km	MPC · JPL
43455	2000 YG_{103}	—	December 28, 2000	Socorro	LINEAR	V	1.9 km	MPC · JPL
43456	2000 YG_{117}	—	December 30, 2000	Socorro	LINEAR	·	2.6 km	MPC · JPL
43457	2000 YF_{118}	—	December 30, 2000	Socorro	LINEAR	·	3.3 km	MPC · JPL
43458	2000 YF_{119}	—	December 30, 2000	Socorro	LINEAR	·	2.1 km	MPC · JPL
43459	2000 YB_{122}	—	December 28, 2000	Kitt Peak	Spacewatch	·	4.8 km	MPC · JPL
43460	2000 YM_{123}	—	December 28, 2000	Socorro	LINEAR	VER	10 km	MPC · JPL
43461	2000 YL_{128}	—	December 29, 2000	Haleakala	NEAT	·	3.0 km	MPC · JPL
43462	2001 AV	—	January 2, 2001	Oizumi	T. Kobayashi	·	3.0 km	MPC · JPL
43463	2001 AN_{5}	—	January 2, 2001	Socorro	LINEAR	V	1.8 km	MPC · JPL
43464	2001 AA_{9}	—	January 2, 2001	Socorro	LINEAR	V · slow	1.9 km	MPC · JPL
43465	2001 AV_{10}	—	January 2, 2001	Socorro	LINEAR	·	3.2 km	MPC · JPL
43466	2001 AV_{14}	—	January 2, 2001	Socorro	LINEAR	·	3.1 km	MPC · JPL
43467	2001 AD_{15}	—	January 2, 2001	Socorro	LINEAR	·	2.9 km	MPC · JPL
43468	2001 AU_{28}	—	January 4, 2001	Socorro	LINEAR	·	3.7 km	MPC · JPL
43469	2001 AP_{29}	—	January 4, 2001	Socorro	LINEAR	EUN	5.5 km	MPC · JPL
43470	2001 AN_{31}	—	January 4, 2001	Socorro	LINEAR	·	3.2 km	MPC · JPL
43471	2001 AH_{32}	—	January 4, 2001	Socorro	LINEAR	GEF	3.2 km	MPC · JPL
43472	2001 AH_{33}	—	January 4, 2001	Socorro	LINEAR	·	12 km	MPC · JPL
43473	2001 AY_{33}	—	January 4, 2001	Socorro	LINEAR	V	1.9 km	MPC · JPL
43474	2001 AE_{40}	—	January 3, 2001	Anderson Mesa	LONEOS	·	1.9 km	MPC · JPL
43475	2001 AY_{40}	—	January 3, 2001	Anderson Mesa	LONEOS	·	5.0 km	MPC · JPL
43476	2001 AD_{42}	—	January 3, 2001	Haleakala	NEAT	·	3.8 km	MPC · JPL
43477	2001 BX_{7}	—	January 19, 2001	Socorro	LINEAR	MAR	3.0 km	MPC · JPL
43478	2001 BH_{9}	—	January 19, 2001	Socorro	LINEAR	MAS	2.9 km	MPC · JPL
43479	2001 BG_{15}	—	January 21, 2001	Oizumi	T. Kobayashi	·	2.1 km	MPC · JPL
43480	2001 BO_{15}	—	January 21, 2001	Oizumi	T. Kobayashi	THM	6.6 km	MPC · JPL
43481	2001 BC_{17}	—	January 18, 2001	Socorro	LINEAR	·	6.4 km	MPC · JPL
43482	2001 BW_{32}	—	January 20, 2001	Socorro	LINEAR	·	2.2 km	MPC · JPL
43483	2001 BO_{38}	—	January 24, 2001	Oaxaca	Roe, J. M.	·	5.9 km	MPC · JPL
43484	2001 BF_{43}	—	January 19, 2001	Socorro	LINEAR	·	4.7 km	MPC · JPL
43485	2001 BN_{43}	—	January 19, 2001	Socorro	LINEAR	·	6.7 km	MPC · JPL
43486	2001 BW_{56}	—	January 19, 2001	Kitt Peak	Spacewatch	·	3.4 km	MPC · JPL
43487	2001 BJ_{60}	—	January 29, 2001	Oizumi	T. Kobayashi	(5)	5.5 km	MPC · JPL
43488	2001 BC_{62}	—	January 26, 2001	Socorro	LINEAR	·	10 km	MPC · JPL
43489	2001 BB_{75}	—	January 31, 2001	Socorro	LINEAR	·	8.6 km	MPC · JPL
43490	2001 CL	—	February 2, 2001	Višnjan Observatory	K. Korlević	slow	9.3 km	MPC · JPL
43491	2001 CP	—	February 1, 2001	Socorro	LINEAR	MAR	4.2 km	MPC · JPL
43492	2001 CV	—	February 1, 2001	Socorro	LINEAR	·	2.3 km	MPC · JPL
43493	2001 CV_{1}	—	February 1, 2001	Socorro	LINEAR	·	5.5 km	MPC · JPL
43494	2001 CJ_{4}	—	February 1, 2001	Socorro	LINEAR	·	2.7 km	MPC · JPL
43495	2001 CJ_{7}	—	February 1, 2001	Socorro	LINEAR	NYS	1.9 km	MPC · JPL
43496	2001 CF_{16}	—	February 1, 2001	Socorro	LINEAR	V	1.4 km	MPC · JPL
43497	2001 CY_{17}	—	February 2, 2001	Socorro	LINEAR	·	10 km	MPC · JPL
43498	2001 CT_{19}	—	February 2, 2001	Socorro	LINEAR	·	10 km	MPC · JPL
43499	2001 CY_{19}	—	February 3, 2001	Prescott	P. G. Comba	·	3.0 km	MPC · JPL
43500 Chandler	2001 CP_{22}	Chandler	February 1, 2001	Anderson Mesa	LONEOS	THM	4.8 km	MPC · JPL

== 43501–43600 ==
back to top

Designation			Discovery			Properties		Ref
Permanent	Provisional	Named after	Date	Site	Discoverer(s)	Category	Diam.	Ref
43501 Oldroyd	2001 CW_{22}	Oldroyd	February 1, 2001	Anderson Mesa	LONEOS	NYS	2.1 km	MPC · JPL
43502	2001 CY_{28}	—	February 2, 2001	Anderson Mesa	LONEOS	·	2.3 km	MPC · JPL
43503	2001 CK_{29}	—	February 2, 2001	Anderson Mesa	LONEOS	CYB	15 km	MPC · JPL
43504	2001 CF_{33}	—	February 13, 2001	Socorro	LINEAR	MAR	2.6 km	MPC · JPL
43505	2001 CK_{33}	—	February 13, 2001	Socorro	LINEAR	·	3.8 km	MPC · JPL
43506	2001 CE_{36}	—	February 15, 2001	Oizumi	T. Kobayashi	·	5.7 km	MPC · JPL
43507	2001 CN_{39}	—	February 13, 2001	Socorro	LINEAR	V	1.9 km	MPC · JPL
43508	2001 CV_{40}	—	February 15, 2001	Socorro	LINEAR	·	7.0 km	MPC · JPL
43509	2001 CY_{44}	—	February 15, 2001	Socorro	LINEAR	EUN	3.2 km	MPC · JPL
43510	2001 CG_{46}	—	February 15, 2001	Socorro	LINEAR	·	3.8 km	MPC · JPL
43511 Cima Ekar	2001 CP_{48}	Cima Ekar	February 11, 2001	Asiago	ADAS	THM	4.6 km	MPC · JPL
43512	2001 CL_{49}	—	February 2, 2001	Anderson Mesa	LONEOS	·	2.6 km	MPC · JPL
43513	2001 DG_{4}	—	February 16, 2001	Socorro	LINEAR	V	1.8 km	MPC · JPL
43514	2001 DO_{5}	—	February 16, 2001	Socorro	LINEAR	·	8.2 km	MPC · JPL
43515	2001 DS_{11}	—	February 17, 2001	Socorro	LINEAR	EOS	4.6 km	MPC · JPL
43516	2001 DH_{12}	—	February 17, 2001	Socorro	LINEAR	·	3.5 km	MPC · JPL
43517	2001 DO_{13}	—	February 19, 2001	Oizumi	T. Kobayashi	·	7.8 km	MPC · JPL
43518	2001 DQ_{15}	—	February 16, 2001	Socorro	LINEAR	·	5.8 km	MPC · JPL
43519	2001 DP_{16}	—	February 16, 2001	Socorro	LINEAR	EOS	5.0 km	MPC · JPL
43520	2001 DM_{17}	—	February 16, 2001	Socorro	LINEAR	·	4.5 km	MPC · JPL
43521	2001 DU_{19}	—	February 16, 2001	Socorro	LINEAR	·	6.4 km	MPC · JPL
43522	2001 DX_{20}	—	February 16, 2001	Socorro	LINEAR	·	9.1 km	MPC · JPL
43523	2001 DJ_{22}	—	February 16, 2001	Socorro	LINEAR	·	10 km	MPC · JPL
43524	2001 DQ_{30}	—	February 17, 2001	Socorro	LINEAR	·	2.8 km	MPC · JPL
43525	2001 DR_{32}	—	February 17, 2001	Socorro	LINEAR	EOS	4.3 km	MPC · JPL
43526	2001 DD_{37}	—	February 19, 2001	Socorro	LINEAR	·	3.5 km	MPC · JPL
43527	2001 DS_{51}	—	February 16, 2001	Socorro	LINEAR	·	9.4 km	MPC · JPL
43528	2001 DZ_{59}	—	February 19, 2001	Socorro	LINEAR	·	4.1 km	MPC · JPL
43529	2001 DF_{65}	—	February 19, 2001	Socorro	LINEAR	·	3.7 km	MPC · JPL
43530	2001 DN_{69}	—	February 19, 2001	Socorro	LINEAR	(1298)	9.1 km	MPC · JPL
43531	2001 DC_{71}	—	February 19, 2001	Socorro	LINEAR	EUN	3.9 km	MPC · JPL
43532	2001 DX_{72}	—	February 19, 2001	Socorro	LINEAR	·	9.0 km	MPC · JPL
43533	2001 DE_{74}	—	February 19, 2001	Socorro	LINEAR	(1338) (FLO)	3.5 km	MPC · JPL
43534	2001 DZ_{78}	—	February 16, 2001	Socorro	LINEAR	slow	8.9 km	MPC · JPL
43535	2001 DE_{97}	—	February 17, 2001	Socorro	LINEAR	CYB	7.2 km	MPC · JPL
43536	2001 DS_{107}	—	February 22, 2001	Kitt Peak	Spacewatch	·	5.5 km	MPC · JPL
43537	2001 EF_{2}	—	March 1, 2001	Socorro	LINEAR	·	6.8 km	MPC · JPL
43538	2001 EJ_{6}	—	March 2, 2001	Anderson Mesa	LONEOS	·	9.8 km	MPC · JPL
43539	2001 EF_{12}	—	March 3, 2001	Socorro	LINEAR	·	5.1 km	MPC · JPL
43540	2001 EY_{13}	—	March 15, 2001	Socorro	LINEAR	EOS	5.6 km	MPC · JPL
43541	2001 EC_{23}	—	March 15, 2001	Kitt Peak	Spacewatch	·	2.9 km	MPC · JPL
43542	2001 EC_{27}	—	March 2, 2001	Anderson Mesa	LONEOS	·	4.8 km	MPC · JPL
43543	2001 FB_{3}	—	March 18, 2001	Socorro	LINEAR	VER	8.1 km	MPC · JPL
43544	2001 FM_{3}	—	March 18, 2001	Socorro	LINEAR	HYG	6.8 km	MPC · JPL
43545	2001 FL_{5}	—	March 18, 2001	Socorro	LINEAR	·	9.0 km	MPC · JPL
43546	2001 FJ_{8}	—	March 18, 2001	Socorro	LINEAR	·	10 km	MPC · JPL
43547	2001 FU_{10}	—	March 19, 2001	Anderson Mesa	LONEOS	·	9.8 km	MPC · JPL
43548	2001 FP_{11}	—	March 19, 2001	Anderson Mesa	LONEOS	·	2.6 km	MPC · JPL
43549	2001 FN_{16}	—	March 19, 2001	Anderson Mesa	LONEOS	KOR	3.7 km	MPC · JPL
43550	2001 FS_{24}	—	March 17, 2001	Socorro	LINEAR	·	8.6 km	MPC · JPL
43551	2001 FY_{28}	—	March 19, 2001	Socorro	LINEAR	·	10 km	MPC · JPL
43552	2001 FT_{34}	—	March 18, 2001	Socorro	LINEAR	TIN	2.4 km	MPC · JPL
43553	2001 FT_{39}	—	March 18, 2001	Socorro	LINEAR	·	6.2 km	MPC · JPL
43554	2001 FW_{44}	—	March 18, 2001	Socorro	LINEAR	·	5.1 km	MPC · JPL
43555	2001 FJ_{60}	—	March 19, 2001	Socorro	LINEAR	EOS	6.0 km	MPC · JPL
43556	2001 FK_{60}	—	March 19, 2001	Socorro	LINEAR	·	6.0 km	MPC · JPL
43557	2001 FA_{61}	—	March 19, 2001	Socorro	LINEAR	NYS	3.1 km	MPC · JPL
43558	2001 FW_{62}	—	March 19, 2001	Socorro	LINEAR	EOS	5.2 km	MPC · JPL
43559	2001 FU_{64}	—	March 19, 2001	Socorro	LINEAR	·	7.1 km	MPC · JPL
43560	2001 FX_{64}	—	March 19, 2001	Socorro	LINEAR	PHO	7.5 km	MPC · JPL
43561	2001 FD_{80}	—	March 21, 2001	Socorro	LINEAR	EOS	6.8 km	MPC · JPL
43562	2001 FE_{97}	—	March 16, 2001	Socorro	LINEAR	·	6.7 km	MPC · JPL
43563	2001 FB_{102}	—	March 17, 2001	Socorro	LINEAR	·	9.7 km	MPC · JPL
43564	2001 FG_{108}	—	March 18, 2001	Socorro	LINEAR	·	5.6 km	MPC · JPL
43565	2001 FC_{110}	—	March 18, 2001	Socorro	LINEAR	·	2.8 km	MPC · JPL
43566	2001 FQ_{116}	—	March 19, 2001	Socorro	LINEAR	ADE	6.5 km	MPC · JPL
43567	2001 FL_{120}	—	March 26, 2001	Socorro	LINEAR	EOS	5.2 km	MPC · JPL
43568	2001 FV_{134}	—	March 21, 2001	Anderson Mesa	LONEOS	fast	8.4 km	MPC · JPL
43569	2001 FY_{142}	—	March 23, 2001	Haleakala	NEAT	EUN	3.9 km	MPC · JPL
43570	2001 FQ_{150}	—	March 24, 2001	Anderson Mesa	LONEOS	PHO	3.9 km	MPC · JPL
43571	2001 FD_{165}	—	March 19, 2001	Anderson Mesa	LONEOS	(194)	4.3 km	MPC · JPL
43572	2001 FH_{167}	—	March 19, 2001	Socorro	LINEAR	·	2.9 km	MPC · JPL
43573	2001 FC_{169}	—	March 23, 2001	Anderson Mesa	LONEOS	·	7.0 km	MPC · JPL
43574 Joyharjo	2001 FU_{192}	Joyharjo	March 26, 2001	Kitt Peak	M. W. Buie	(5)	4.3 km	MPC · JPL
43575	2001 GQ_{6}	—	April 14, 2001	Haleakala	NEAT	·	4.5 km	MPC · JPL
43576	2001 HO_{28}	—	April 27, 2001	Socorro	LINEAR	·	2.8 km	MPC · JPL
43577	2001 HH_{36}	—	April 29, 2001	Socorro	LINEAR	·	5.0 km	MPC · JPL
43578	2001 KD_{15}	—	May 18, 2001	Socorro	LINEAR	·	3.2 km	MPC · JPL
43579	2001 KW_{26}	—	May 17, 2001	Socorro	LINEAR	·	2.1 km	MPC · JPL
43580	2001 KQ_{37}	—	May 22, 2001	Socorro	LINEAR	·	4.8 km	MPC · JPL
43581	2001 KS_{52}	—	May 18, 2001	Anderson Mesa	LONEOS	·	3.5 km	MPC · JPL
43582	2001 KO_{59}	—	May 26, 2001	Socorro	LINEAR	·	4.4 km	MPC · JPL
43583	2001 KR_{59}	—	May 26, 2001	Socorro	LINEAR	·	2.7 km	MPC · JPL
43584	2001 KW_{66}	—	May 30, 2001	Socorro	LINEAR	PHO	2.8 km	MPC · JPL
43585	2001 LZ_{18}	—	June 15, 2001	Socorro	LINEAR	·	3.6 km	MPC · JPL
43586	2001 OD_{26}	—	July 19, 2001	Haleakala	NEAT	V	2.0 km	MPC · JPL
43587	2001 PA_{10}	—	August 8, 2001	Haleakala	NEAT	·	2.0 km	MPC · JPL
43588	2001 PL_{14}	—	August 14, 2001	Reedy Creek	J. Broughton	NYS	2.8 km	MPC · JPL
43589	2001 QW	—	August 16, 2001	Socorro	LINEAR	·	1.9 km	MPC · JPL
43590	2001 QD_{2}	—	August 16, 2001	Socorro	LINEAR	·	2.3 km	MPC · JPL
43591	2001 QX_{55}	—	August 16, 2001	Socorro	LINEAR	·	2.1 km	MPC · JPL
43592	2001 QC_{72}	—	August 20, 2001	Oakley	Wolfe, C.	·	10 km	MPC · JPL
43593	2001 QR_{73}	—	August 16, 2001	Socorro	LINEAR	·	2.5 km	MPC · JPL
43594	2001 QP_{101}	—	August 18, 2001	Socorro	LINEAR	·	2.4 km	MPC · JPL
43595	2001 QT_{101}	—	August 18, 2001	Socorro	LINEAR	EUN	5.9 km	MPC · JPL
43596	2001 QK_{126}	—	August 20, 2001	Socorro	LINEAR	EOS	4.3 km	MPC · JPL
43597 Changshaopo	2001 QT_{163}	Changshaopo	August 31, 2001	Desert Eagle	W. K. Y. Yeung	·	1.9 km	MPC · JPL
43598	2001 QY_{195}	—	August 22, 2001	Socorro	LINEAR	EUN	3.8 km	MPC · JPL
43599	2001 QS_{256}	—	August 25, 2001	Socorro	LINEAR	·	7.7 km	MPC · JPL
43600	2001 RG_{22}	—	September 7, 2001	Socorro	LINEAR	·	2.5 km	MPC · JPL

== 43601–43700 ==
back to top

Designation			Discovery			Properties		Ref
Permanent	Provisional	Named after	Date	Site	Discoverer(s)	Category	Diam.	Ref
43601	2001 SU_{148}	—	September 17, 2001	Socorro	LINEAR	·	6.3 km	MPC · JPL
43602	2001 SA_{316}	—	September 25, 2001	Socorro	LINEAR	·	9.2 km	MPC · JPL
43603	2001 UQ_{13}	—	October 24, 2001	Desert Eagle	W. K. Y. Yeung	·	4.7 km	MPC · JPL
43604	2001 VN_{12}	—	November 10, 2001	Socorro	LINEAR	·	5.6 km	MPC · JPL
43605 Gakuho	2001 WD_{16}	Gakuho	November 25, 2001	Bisei SG Center	BATTeRS	·	3.2 km	MPC · JPL
43606	2001 XQ_{2}	—	December 8, 2001	Socorro	LINEAR	H	2.2 km	MPC · JPL
43607	2001 XO_{48}	—	December 10, 2001	Socorro	LINEAR	EUN	5.8 km	MPC · JPL
43608	2001 XM_{60}	—	December 10, 2001	Socorro	LINEAR	·	3.0 km	MPC · JPL
43609	2001 XA_{69}	—	December 11, 2001	Socorro	LINEAR	·	1.7 km	MPC · JPL
43610	2001 XT_{186}	—	December 14, 2001	Socorro	LINEAR	·	6.6 km	MPC · JPL
43611	2002 AV_{128}	—	January 14, 2002	Desert Eagle	W. K. Y. Yeung	·	6.3 km	MPC · JPL
43612	2002 AQ_{160}	—	January 13, 2002	Socorro	LINEAR	·	6.8 km	MPC · JPL
43613	2002 AH_{177}	—	January 14, 2002	Socorro	LINEAR	EOS	6.2 km	MPC · JPL
43614	2002 AT_{187}	—	January 8, 2002	Haleakala	NEAT	·	3.3 km	MPC · JPL
43615	2002 AQ_{193}	—	January 12, 2002	Socorro	LINEAR	EOS	4.0 km	MPC · JPL
43616	2002 CH_{30}	—	February 6, 2002	Socorro	LINEAR	(13314)	5.8 km	MPC · JPL
43617	2002 CL_{43}	—	February 12, 2002	Fountain Hills	C. W. Juels, P. R. Holvorcem	·	10 km	MPC · JPL
43618	2002 CZ_{55}	—	February 7, 2002	Socorro	LINEAR	THM	6.7 km	MPC · JPL
43619	2002 CR_{66}	—	February 7, 2002	Socorro	LINEAR	·	2.1 km	MPC · JPL
43620	2002 CG_{79}	—	February 7, 2002	Socorro	LINEAR	slow	3.1 km	MPC · JPL
43621	2002 CK_{117}	—	February 9, 2002	Anderson Mesa	LONEOS	·	3.9 km	MPC · JPL
43622	2002 CW_{128}	—	February 7, 2002	Socorro	LINEAR	·	3.8 km	MPC · JPL
43623	2002 CM_{138}	—	February 8, 2002	Socorro	LINEAR	·	2.0 km	MPC · JPL
43624	2002 CY_{146}	—	February 9, 2002	Socorro	LINEAR	·	2.8 km	MPC · JPL
43625	2002 CE_{168}	—	February 8, 2002	Socorro	LINEAR	LIX	9.8 km	MPC · JPL
43626	2002 CV_{168}	—	February 8, 2002	Socorro	LINEAR	·	4.3 km	MPC · JPL
43627	2002 CL_{224}	—	February 11, 2002	Socorro	LINEAR	L4	10 km	MPC · JPL
43628	2002 CA_{234}	—	February 11, 2002	Socorro	LINEAR	LIX	12 km	MPC · JPL
43629	2002 CG_{234}	—	February 7, 2002	Kitt Peak	Spacewatch	·	2.4 km	MPC · JPL
43630	2002 CZ_{235}	—	February 13, 2002	Palomar	NEAT	·	3.9 km	MPC · JPL
43631	2002 CS_{236}	—	February 8, 2002	Socorro	LINEAR	EOS	5.3 km	MPC · JPL
43632	2002 CQ_{244}	—	February 11, 2002	Socorro	LINEAR	·	1.9 km	MPC · JPL
43633	2002 CX_{247}	—	February 15, 2002	Socorro	LINEAR	NYS	1.7 km	MPC · JPL
43634	2002 EA_{10}	—	March 14, 2002	Socorro	LINEAR	H	1.6 km	MPC · JPL
43635	2002 EP_{19}	—	March 9, 2002	Palomar	NEAT	·	1.7 km	MPC · JPL
43636	2002 EC_{22}	—	March 10, 2002	Haleakala	NEAT	·	1.7 km	MPC · JPL
43637	2002 EW_{28}	—	March 9, 2002	Socorro	LINEAR	LIX	10 km	MPC · JPL
43638	2002 EU_{30}	—	March 9, 2002	Socorro	LINEAR	·	2.9 km	MPC · JPL
43639	2002 EZ_{30}	—	March 9, 2002	Socorro	LINEAR	·	5.3 km	MPC · JPL
43640	2002 EF_{33}	—	March 11, 2002	Palomar	NEAT	·	8.4 km	MPC · JPL
43641	2002 EG_{40}	—	March 9, 2002	Socorro	LINEAR	·	6.8 km	MPC · JPL
43642	2002 EA_{41}	—	March 9, 2002	Socorro	LINEAR	·	6.2 km	MPC · JPL
43643	2002 EO_{51}	—	March 12, 2002	Kitt Peak	Spacewatch	·	2.7 km	MPC · JPL
43644	2002 EU_{65}	—	March 13, 2002	Socorro	LINEAR	·	2.1 km	MPC · JPL
43645	2002 EM_{73}	—	March 13, 2002	Socorro	LINEAR	·	3.6 km	MPC · JPL
43646	2002 ER_{73}	—	March 13, 2002	Socorro	LINEAR	·	3.2 km	MPC · JPL
43647	2002 EU_{74}	—	March 13, 2002	Socorro	LINEAR	·	7.7 km	MPC · JPL
43648	2002 EY_{76}	—	March 11, 2002	Kitt Peak	Spacewatch	KOR	3.1 km	MPC · JPL
43649	2002 EE_{87}	—	March 9, 2002	Socorro	LINEAR	V	2.0 km	MPC · JPL
43650	2002 EF_{87}	—	March 9, 2002	Socorro	LINEAR	·	1.9 km	MPC · JPL
43651	2002 EU_{87}	—	March 9, 2002	Socorro	LINEAR	·	4.6 km	MPC · JPL
43652	2002 EQ_{88}	—	March 9, 2002	Socorro	LINEAR	·	5.1 km	MPC · JPL
43653	2002 EJ_{92}	—	March 13, 2002	Socorro	LINEAR	·	5.2 km	MPC · JPL
43654	2002 EE_{98}	—	March 12, 2002	Socorro	LINEAR	·	4.8 km	MPC · JPL
43655	2002 EC_{99}	—	March 15, 2002	Socorro	LINEAR	·	3.4 km	MPC · JPL
43656	2002 ER_{104}	—	March 9, 2002	Socorro	LINEAR	·	3.6 km	MPC · JPL
43657 Bobmiller	2002 ES_{110}	Bobmiller	March 9, 2002	Catalina	CSS	HYG	6.2 km	MPC · JPL
43658	2002 FV	—	March 18, 2002	Desert Eagle	W. K. Y. Yeung	·	2.9 km	MPC · JPL
43659	2002 FJ_{1}	—	March 18, 2002	Desert Eagle	W. K. Y. Yeung	·	3.3 km	MPC · JPL
43660	2002 FQ_{2}	—	March 19, 2002	Desert Eagle	W. K. Y. Yeung	NYS	2.6 km	MPC · JPL
43661	2002 FY_{2}	—	March 19, 2002	Desert Eagle	W. K. Y. Yeung	slow	2.5 km	MPC · JPL
43662	2002 FP_{8}	—	March 16, 2002	Socorro	LINEAR	·	3.4 km	MPC · JPL
43663	2002 FS_{10}	—	March 17, 2002	Socorro	LINEAR	·	2.7 km	MPC · JPL
43664	2002 FR_{13}	—	March 16, 2002	Anderson Mesa	LONEOS	·	10 km	MPC · JPL
43665	2002 FM_{22}	—	March 19, 2002	Socorro	LINEAR	·	3.3 km	MPC · JPL
43666	2002 FX_{33}	—	March 20, 2002	Anderson Mesa	LONEOS	·	6.8 km	MPC · JPL
43667 Dumlupınar	2002 GO_{1}	Dumlupınar	April 4, 2002	Haleakala	NEAT	PHO	2.5 km	MPC · JPL
43668	2002 GH_{7}	—	April 14, 2002	Desert Eagle	W. K. Y. Yeung	GEF	3.9 km	MPC · JPL
43669 Winterthur	2002 GA_{10}	Winterthur	April 15, 2002	Winterthur	M. Griesser	·	2.4 km	MPC · JPL
43670	2002 GA_{13}	—	April 14, 2002	Socorro	LINEAR	·	3.0 km	MPC · JPL
43671	2002 GN_{16}	—	April 15, 2002	Socorro	LINEAR	·	1.3 km	MPC · JPL
43672	2002 GC_{17}	—	April 15, 2002	Socorro	LINEAR	·	2.8 km	MPC · JPL
43673	2002 GO_{17}	—	April 15, 2002	Socorro	LINEAR	·	2.0 km	MPC · JPL
43674	2002 GP_{19}	—	April 14, 2002	Socorro	LINEAR	·	4.3 km	MPC · JPL
43675	2002 GM_{20}	—	April 14, 2002	Socorro	LINEAR	NYS	2.0 km	MPC · JPL
43676	2002 GP_{22}	—	April 14, 2002	Haleakala	NEAT	·	2.1 km	MPC · JPL
43677	2002 HN	—	April 16, 2002	Desert Eagle	W. K. Y. Yeung	·	2.5 km	MPC · JPL
43678	2002 HP	—	April 16, 2002	Desert Eagle	W. K. Y. Yeung	·	1.8 km	MPC · JPL
43679	2002 HJ_{4}	—	April 16, 2002	Socorro	LINEAR	·	2.5 km	MPC · JPL
43680	2002 HE_{7}	—	April 18, 2002	Desert Eagle	W. K. Y. Yeung	·	2.8 km	MPC · JPL
43681	2002 JG_{2}	—	May 4, 2002	Desert Eagle	W. K. Y. Yeung	·	2.6 km	MPC · JPL
43682	2002 JB_{7}	—	May 3, 2002	Palomar	NEAT	·	2.3 km	MPC · JPL
43683	2002 JF_{12}	—	May 4, 2002	Desert Eagle	W. K. Y. Yeung	·	4.6 km	MPC · JPL
43684	2002 JZ_{24}	—	May 8, 2002	Socorro	LINEAR	·	4.9 km	MPC · JPL
43685	2002 JK_{26}	—	May 8, 2002	Socorro	LINEAR	·	7.2 km	MPC · JPL
43686	2002 JS_{41}	—	May 8, 2002	Socorro	LINEAR	·	3.4 km	MPC · JPL
43687	2002 JF_{59}	—	May 9, 2002	Socorro	LINEAR	·	2.5 km	MPC · JPL
43688	2002 JN_{70}	—	May 8, 2002	Socorro	LINEAR	·	2.9 km	MPC · JPL
43689	2002 JY_{71}	—	May 8, 2002	Socorro	LINEAR	·	3.2 km	MPC · JPL
43690	2002 JQ_{72}	—	May 8, 2002	Socorro	LINEAR	·	2.0 km	MPC · JPL
43691	2002 JA_{76}	—	May 11, 2002	Socorro	LINEAR	(12739)	3.3 km	MPC · JPL
43692	2160 P-L	—	September 24, 1960	Palomar	C. J. van Houten, I. van Houten-Groeneveld, T. Gehrels	·	2.7 km	MPC · JPL
43693	2731 P-L	—	September 24, 1960	Palomar	C. J. van Houten, I. van Houten-Groeneveld, T. Gehrels	·	4.5 km	MPC · JPL
43694	2846 P-L	—	September 24, 1960	Palomar	C. J. van Houten, I. van Houten-Groeneveld, T. Gehrels	·	2.6 km	MPC · JPL
43695	4079 P-L	—	September 24, 1960	Palomar	C. J. van Houten, I. van Houten-Groeneveld, T. Gehrels	·	2.0 km	MPC · JPL
43696	4159 P-L	—	September 24, 1960	Palomar	C. J. van Houten, I. van Houten-Groeneveld, T. Gehrels	·	2.0 km	MPC · JPL
43697	4620 P-L	—	September 24, 1960	Palomar	C. J. van Houten, I. van Houten-Groeneveld, T. Gehrels	·	1.8 km	MPC · JPL
43698	4878 P-L	—	September 26, 1960	Palomar	C. J. van Houten, I. van Houten-Groeneveld, T. Gehrels	·	4.6 km	MPC · JPL
43699	6586 P-L	—	September 24, 1960	Palomar	C. J. van Houten, I. van Houten-Groeneveld, T. Gehrels	·	4.2 km	MPC · JPL
43700	6820 P-L	—	September 24, 1960	Palomar	C. J. van Houten, I. van Houten-Groeneveld, T. Gehrels	·	3.0 km	MPC · JPL

== 43701–43800 ==
back to top

Designation			Discovery			Properties		Ref
Permanent	Provisional	Named after	Date	Site	Discoverer(s)	Category	Diam.	Ref
43701	1115 T-1	—	March 25, 1971	Palomar	C. J. van Houten, I. van Houten-Groeneveld, T. Gehrels	·	3.6 km	MPC · JPL
43702	1142 T-1	—	March 25, 1971	Palomar	C. J. van Houten, I. van Houten-Groeneveld, T. Gehrels	·	2.0 km	MPC · JPL
43703	1276 T-1	—	March 25, 1971	Palomar	C. J. van Houten, I. van Houten-Groeneveld, T. Gehrels	·	1.9 km	MPC · JPL
43704	3225 T-1	—	March 26, 1971	Palomar	C. J. van Houten, I. van Houten-Groeneveld, T. Gehrels	·	6.5 km	MPC · JPL
43705	1131 T-2	—	September 29, 1973	Palomar	C. J. van Houten, I. van Houten-Groeneveld, T. Gehrels	·	2.6 km	MPC · JPL
43706 Iphiklos	1416 T-2	Iphiklos	September 29, 1973	Palomar	C. J. van Houten, I. van Houten-Groeneveld, T. Gehrels	L4	15 km	MPC · JPL
43707	2050 T-2	—	September 29, 1973	Palomar	C. J. van Houten, I. van Houten-Groeneveld, T. Gehrels	NYS	2.1 km	MPC · JPL
43708	2126 T-2	—	September 29, 1973	Palomar	C. J. van Houten, I. van Houten-Groeneveld, T. Gehrels	·	1.6 km	MPC · JPL
43709	2284 T-2	—	September 29, 1973	Palomar	C. J. van Houten, I. van Houten-Groeneveld, T. Gehrels	·	1.8 km	MPC · JPL
43710	2907 T-2	—	September 30, 1973	Palomar	C. J. van Houten, I. van Houten-Groeneveld, T. Gehrels	·	2.1 km	MPC · JPL
43711	3005 T-2	—	September 30, 1973	Palomar	C. J. van Houten, I. van Houten-Groeneveld, T. Gehrels	·	2.0 km	MPC · JPL
43712	5054 T-2	—	September 25, 1973	Palomar	C. J. van Houten, I. van Houten-Groeneveld, T. Gehrels	·	3.4 km	MPC · JPL
43713	5104 T-2	—	September 25, 1973	Palomar	C. J. van Houten, I. van Houten-Groeneveld, T. Gehrels	·	3.7 km	MPC · JPL
43714	1048 T-3	—	October 17, 1977	Palomar	C. J. van Houten, I. van Houten-Groeneveld, T. Gehrels	·	5.2 km	MPC · JPL
43715	1084 T-3	—	October 17, 1977	Palomar	C. J. van Houten, I. van Houten-Groeneveld, T. Gehrels	EOS	6.4 km	MPC · JPL
43716	1096 T-3	—	October 17, 1977	Palomar	C. J. van Houten, I. van Houten-Groeneveld, T. Gehrels	ADE	6.9 km	MPC · JPL
43717	2023 T-3	—	October 16, 1977	Palomar	C. J. van Houten, I. van Houten-Groeneveld, T. Gehrels	·	2.0 km	MPC · JPL
43718	2208 T-3	—	October 16, 1977	Palomar	C. J. van Houten, I. van Houten-Groeneveld, T. Gehrels	EOS	4.4 km	MPC · JPL
43719	2666 T-3	—	October 11, 1977	Palomar	C. J. van Houten, I. van Houten-Groeneveld, T. Gehrels	·	3.3 km	MPC · JPL
43720	4301 T-3	—	October 16, 1977	Palomar	C. J. van Houten, I. van Houten-Groeneveld, T. Gehrels	·	5.2 km	MPC · JPL
43721	4433 T-3	—	October 16, 1977	Palomar	C. J. van Houten, I. van Houten-Groeneveld, T. Gehrels	·	8.1 km	MPC · JPL
43722 Carloseduardo	1968 OB	Carloseduardo	July 18, 1968	Cerro El Roble	C. Torres, Cofre, S.	·	13 km	MPC · JPL
43723	1975 SZ_{1}	—	September 30, 1975	Palomar	S. J. Bus	·	2.8 km	MPC · JPL
43724 Pechstein	1975 UY	Pechstein	October 29, 1975	Tautenburg Observatory	F. Börngen	·	2.9 km	MPC · JPL
43725	1978 RK_{9}	—	September 2, 1978	La Silla	C.-I. Lagerkvist	·	4.1 km	MPC · JPL
43726	1978 UJ_{5}	—	October 27, 1978	Palomar	C. M. Olmstead	·	2.2 km	MPC · JPL
43727	1979 MQ_{2}	—	June 25, 1979	Siding Spring	E. F. Helin, S. J. Bus	·	2.3 km	MPC · JPL
43728	1979 MA_{3}	—	June 25, 1979	Siding Spring	E. F. Helin, S. J. Bus	·	2.5 km	MPC · JPL
43729	1979 MS_{3}	—	June 25, 1979	Siding Spring	E. F. Helin, S. J. Bus	·	6.3 km	MPC · JPL
43730	1979 MK_{4}	—	June 25, 1979	Siding Spring	E. F. Helin, S. J. Bus	·	1.4 km	MPC · JPL
43731	1979 ML_{5}	—	June 25, 1979	Siding Spring	E. F. Helin, S. J. Bus	·	3.8 km	MPC · JPL
43732	1979 MO_{7}	—	June 25, 1979	Siding Spring	E. F. Helin, S. J. Bus	·	8.1 km	MPC · JPL
43733	1979 MV_{7}	—	June 25, 1979	Siding Spring	E. F. Helin, S. J. Bus	HYG	5.9 km	MPC · JPL
43734	1979 MY_{7}	—	June 25, 1979	Siding Spring	E. F. Helin, S. J. Bus	GEF	2.9 km	MPC · JPL
43735	1981 DQ_{1}	—	February 28, 1981	Siding Spring	S. J. Bus	·	12 km	MPC · JPL
43736	1981 DL_{2}	—	February 28, 1981	Siding Spring	S. J. Bus	·	1.9 km	MPC · JPL
43737	1981 EU_{3}	—	March 2, 1981	Siding Spring	S. J. Bus	·	3.0 km	MPC · JPL
43738	1981 ED_{6}	—	March 7, 1981	Siding Spring	S. J. Bus	·	3.6 km	MPC · JPL
43739	1981 EP_{7}	—	March 1, 1981	Siding Spring	S. J. Bus	·	3.3 km	MPC · JPL
43740	1981 EM_{9}	—	March 1, 1981	Siding Spring	S. J. Bus	(2076)	2.1 km	MPC · JPL
43741	1981 ES_{10}	—	March 1, 1981	Siding Spring	S. J. Bus	·	2.7 km	MPC · JPL
43742	1981 EX_{12}	—	March 1, 1981	Siding Spring	S. J. Bus	·	5.1 km	MPC · JPL
43743	1981 EK_{16}	—	March 1, 1981	Siding Spring	S. J. Bus	V	1.9 km	MPC · JPL
43744	1981 EX_{17}	—	March 2, 1981	Siding Spring	S. J. Bus	·	3.4 km	MPC · JPL
43745	1981 EN_{22}	—	March 2, 1981	Siding Spring	S. J. Bus	·	2.9 km	MPC · JPL
43746	1981 EH_{31}	—	March 2, 1981	Siding Spring	S. J. Bus	·	2.3 km	MPC · JPL
43747	1981 EX_{31}	—	March 2, 1981	Siding Spring	S. J. Bus	·	5.6 km	MPC · JPL
43748	1981 ET_{37}	—	March 1, 1981	Siding Spring	S. J. Bus	·	1.7 km	MPC · JPL
43749	1981 EG_{46}	—	March 2, 1981	Siding Spring	S. J. Bus	·	1.7 km	MPC · JPL
43750	1981 QG_{3}	—	August 25, 1981	La Silla	H. Debehogne	·	5.2 km	MPC · JPL
43751 Asam	1982 UD_{4}	Asam	October 19, 1982	Tautenburg Observatory	F. Börngen	·	3.5 km	MPC · JPL
43752 Maryosipova	1982 US_{5}	Maryosipova	October 20, 1982	Nauchnij	L. G. Karachkina	·	3.5 km	MPC · JPL
43753 Okadayoshirou	1982 VN_{3}	Okadayoshirou	November 14, 1982	Kiso	H. Kosai, K. Furukawa	·	3.3 km	MPC · JPL
43754	1983 AA	—	January 9, 1983	Anderson Mesa	B. A. Skiff	PHO	3.3 km	MPC · JPL
43755	1983 RJ_{1}	—	September 5, 1983	Harvard Observatory	Oak Ridge Observatory	NYS	3.4 km	MPC · JPL
43756	1984 CE	—	February 10, 1984	Palomar	Gibson, J.	·	7.0 km	MPC · JPL
43757	1984 DB_{1}	—	February 27, 1984	La Silla	H. Debehogne	·	12 km	MPC · JPL
43758	1985 QY_{2}	—	August 17, 1985	Palomar	E. F. Helin	·	3.4 km	MPC · JPL
43759	1986 QW_{2}	—	August 28, 1986	La Silla	H. Debehogne	·	2.1 km	MPC · JPL
43760	1986 QD_{3}	—	August 29, 1986	La Silla	H. Debehogne	V	2.0 km	MPC · JPL
43761	1986 QQ_{3}	—	August 29, 1986	La Silla	H. Debehogne	·	7.6 km	MPC · JPL
43762	1986 WC_{1}	—	November 25, 1986	Kleť	Z. Vávrová	THM	7.8 km	MPC · JPL
43763 Russert	1987 KF_{1}	Russert	May 30, 1987	Palomar	C. S. Shoemaker, E. M. Shoemaker	·	5.6 km	MPC · JPL
43764	1988 BL_{5}	—	January 28, 1988	Siding Spring	R. H. McNaught	·	3.5 km	MPC · JPL
43765	1988 CF_{4}	—	February 13, 1988	La Silla	E. W. Elst	EOS	6.3 km	MPC · JPL
43766	1988 CR_{4}	—	February 13, 1988	La Silla	E. W. Elst	(1547)	7.2 km	MPC · JPL
43767 Permeke	1988 CP_{5}	Permeke	February 13, 1988	La Silla	E. W. Elst	slow	5.7 km	MPC · JPL
43768 Lynevans	1988 CH_{7}	Lynevans	February 15, 1988	La Silla	E. W. Elst	·	6.3 km	MPC · JPL
43769	1988 EK	—	March 10, 1988	Palomar	J. Alu	·	6.1 km	MPC · JPL
43770	1988 EX_{1}	—	March 13, 1988	Brorfelde	P. Jensen	HYG	7.2 km	MPC · JPL
43771	1988 TJ	—	October 3, 1988	Kushiro	S. Ueda, H. Kaneda	·	3.5 km	MPC · JPL
43772	1988 TV_{1}	—	October 13, 1988	Kushiro	S. Ueda, H. Kaneda	·	2.7 km	MPC · JPL
43773	1989 AJ	—	January 4, 1989	Yorii	M. Arai, H. Mori	·	9.0 km	MPC · JPL
43774	1989 CO_{2}	—	February 4, 1989	La Silla	E. W. Elst	EOS	7.4 km	MPC · JPL
43775 Tiepolo	1989 CA_{6}	Tiepolo	February 2, 1989	Tautenburg Observatory	F. Börngen	URS	11 km	MPC · JPL
43776	1989 GP_{2}	—	April 3, 1989	La Silla	E. W. Elst	EOS	5.6 km	MPC · JPL
43777	1989 RK_{1}	—	September 3, 1989	Haute Provence	E. W. Elst	EUN	3.9 km	MPC · JPL
43778	1989 SY_{3}	—	September 26, 1989	La Silla	E. W. Elst	NYS	2.5 km	MPC · JPL
43779	1989 SQ_{5}	—	September 26, 1989	La Silla	E. W. Elst	(883)	2.3 km	MPC · JPL
43780	1989 SL_{8}	—	September 23, 1989	La Silla	H. Debehogne	·	4.6 km	MPC · JPL
43781	1989 TB_{3}	—	October 7, 1989	La Silla	E. W. Elst	·	1.1 km	MPC · JPL
43782	1989 US_{2}	—	October 29, 1989	Okutama	Hioki, T., N. Kawasato	·	6.8 km	MPC · JPL
43783 Svyatitelpyotr	1989 UX_{7}	Svyatitelpyotr	October 24, 1989	Nauchnij	L. I. Chernykh	·	8.5 km	MPC · JPL
43784	1989 XR_{1}	—	December 2, 1989	La Silla	E. W. Elst	·	6.2 km	MPC · JPL
43785	1989 YC_{6}	—	December 29, 1989	Haute Provence	E. W. Elst	(2076)	2.5 km	MPC · JPL
43786	1990 QA_{8}	—	August 16, 1990	La Silla	E. W. Elst	·	2.2 km	MPC · JPL
43787	1990 QR_{8}	—	August 16, 1990	La Silla	E. W. Elst	·	2.2 km	MPC · JPL
43788	1990 RB_{3}	—	September 14, 1990	Palomar	H. E. Holt	(194)	3.9 km	MPC · JPL
43789	1990 SN_{9}	—	September 22, 1990	La Silla	E. W. Elst	·	2.2 km	MPC · JPL
43790 Ferdinandbraun	1990 TY_{3}	Ferdinandbraun	October 12, 1990	Tautenburg Observatory	F. Börngen, L. D. Schmadel	·	2.2 km	MPC · JPL
43791	1990 UK_{5}	—	October 16, 1990	La Silla	E. W. Elst	(5)	4.0 km	MPC · JPL
43792 Nobutakagoto	1990 VY_{1}	Nobutakagoto	November 11, 1990	Geisei	T. Seki	·	6.0 km	MPC · JPL
43793 Mackey	1990 VK_{7}	Mackey	November 13, 1990	Palomar	C. S. Shoemaker, D. H. Levy	(5)	2.9 km	MPC · JPL
43794 Yabetakemoto	1990 YP	Yabetakemoto	December 19, 1990	Geisei	T. Seki	·	3.6 km	MPC · JPL
43795	1991 AK_{1}	—	January 15, 1991	Karasuyama	S. Inoda, T. Urata	·	4.9 km	MPC · JPL
43796	1991 AS_{1}	—	January 14, 1991	Palomar	E. F. Helin	BAR	4.1 km	MPC · JPL
43797	1991 AF_{2}	—	January 7, 1991	Siding Spring	R. H. McNaught	EUN	3.8 km	MPC · JPL
43798	1991 GW_{8}	—	April 8, 1991	La Silla	E. W. Elst	·	1.8 km	MPC · JPL
43799	1991 PZ_{10}	—	August 7, 1991	Palomar	H. E. Holt	·	4.5 km	MPC · JPL
43800	1991 PP_{13}	—	August 5, 1991	Palomar	H. E. Holt	EOS	7.8 km	MPC · JPL

== 43801–43900 ==
back to top

Designation			Discovery			Properties		Ref
Permanent	Provisional	Named after	Date	Site	Discoverer(s)	Category	Diam.	Ref
43801	1991 PL_{15}	—	August 8, 1991	Palomar	H. E. Holt	HYG	8.0 km	MPC · JPL
43802	1991 PY_{18}	—	August 10, 1991	Palomar	H. E. Holt	·	3.8 km	MPC · JPL
43803 Wakakinosakura	1991 RH_{2}	Wakakinosakura	September 7, 1991	Geisei	T. Seki	EOS	6.6 km	MPC · JPL
43804 Peterting	1991 RL_{4}	Peterting	September 10, 1991	Tautenburg Observatory	L. D. Schmadel, F. Börngen	·	9.3 km	MPC · JPL
43805	1991 RQ_{5}	—	September 13, 1991	Palomar	H. E. Holt	V	3.2 km	MPC · JPL
43806 Augustepiccard	1991 RG_{7}	Augustepiccard	September 13, 1991	Tautenburg Observatory	F. Börngen, L. D. Schmadel	·	2.4 km	MPC · JPL
43807	1991 RC_{11}	—	September 13, 1991	Palomar	H. E. Holt	slow	13 km	MPC · JPL
43808	1991 RF_{11}	—	September 13, 1991	Palomar	H. E. Holt	·	2.5 km	MPC · JPL
43809	1991 RE_{14}	—	September 13, 1991	Palomar	H. E. Holt	·	6.3 km	MPC · JPL
43810	1991 RJ_{20}	—	September 14, 1991	Palomar	H. E. Holt	NYS	3.2 km	MPC · JPL
43811	1991 RA_{24}	—	September 11, 1991	Palomar	H. E. Holt	NYS	3.4 km	MPC · JPL
43812	1991 RJ_{29}	—	September 13, 1991	Palomar	H. E. Holt	·	16 km	MPC · JPL
43813 Kühner	1991 TQ_{2}	Kühner	October 7, 1991	Tautenburg Observatory	L. D. Schmadel, F. Börngen	·	3.5 km	MPC · JPL
43814	1991 UE_{1}	—	October 18, 1991	Kushiro	S. Ueda, H. Kaneda	·	3.6 km	MPC · JPL
43815	1991 VD_{4}	—	November 3, 1991	Palomar	E. F. Helin	·	14 km	MPC · JPL
43816	1992 CN_{2}	—	February 2, 1992	La Silla	E. W. Elst	·	3.8 km	MPC · JPL
43817	1992 EF_{22}	—	March 1, 1992	La Silla	UESAC	·	3.8 km	MPC · JPL
43818	1992 ET_{32}	—	March 2, 1992	La Silla	UESAC	3:2	11 km	MPC · JPL
43819	1992 LL	—	June 3, 1992	Palomar	G. J. Leonard	·	2.5 km	MPC · JPL
43820	1992 PP_{1}	—	August 8, 1992	Caussols	E. W. Elst	·	2.6 km	MPC · JPL
43821	1992 RL_{3}	—	September 2, 1992	La Silla	E. W. Elst	·	2.1 km	MPC · JPL
43822	1992 RP_{5}	—	September 2, 1992	La Silla	E. W. Elst	·	1.8 km	MPC · JPL
43823	1992 SV_{24}	—	September 29, 1992	Palomar	H. E. Holt	·	7.0 km	MPC · JPL
43824	1992 SY_{24}	—	September 30, 1992	Palomar	H. E. Holt	EOS	7.0 km	MPC · JPL
43825	1992 UJ_{5}	—	October 25, 1992	Okutama	Hioki, T., Hayakawa, S.	·	2.4 km	MPC · JPL
43826	1992 UC_{6}	—	October 28, 1992	Kushiro	S. Ueda, H. Kaneda	·	3.1 km	MPC · JPL
43827	1993 BV_{5}	—	January 27, 1993	Caussols	E. W. Elst	·	3.9 km	MPC · JPL
43828	1993 FB_{5}	—	March 17, 1993	La Silla	UESAC	MRX ·	6.0 km	MPC · JPL
43829	1993 FB_{19}	—	March 17, 1993	La Silla	UESAC	·	3.4 km	MPC · JPL
43830	1993 FZ_{21}	—	March 21, 1993	La Silla	UESAC	·	4.0 km	MPC · JPL
43831	1993 FP_{29}	—	March 21, 1993	La Silla	UESAC	EUN	5.4 km	MPC · JPL
43832	1993 FA_{33}	—	March 19, 1993	La Silla	UESAC	(5)	2.4 km	MPC · JPL
43833	1993 FF_{34}	—	March 19, 1993	La Silla	UESAC	·	2.0 km	MPC · JPL
43834	1993 FC_{45}	—	March 19, 1993	La Silla	UESAC	·	2.0 km	MPC · JPL
43835	1993 FM_{45}	—	March 19, 1993	La Silla	UESAC	·	2.8 km	MPC · JPL
43836	1993 FX_{45}	—	March 19, 1993	La Silla	UESAC	·	3.5 km	MPC · JPL
43837	1993 FN_{49}	—	March 19, 1993	La Silla	UESAC	·	2.7 km	MPC · JPL
43838	1993 FW_{49}	—	March 19, 1993	La Silla	UESAC	·	3.4 km	MPC · JPL
43839	1993 FC_{60}	—	March 19, 1993	La Silla	UESAC	·	2.4 km	MPC · JPL
43840	1993 FE_{76}	—	March 21, 1993	La Silla	UESAC	·	2.4 km	MPC · JPL
43841 Marcustacitus	1993 HB	Marcustacitus	April 17, 1993	Stroncone	Santa Lucia	MAS	2.6 km	MPC · JPL
43842	1993 MR	—	June 26, 1993	Farra d'Isonzo	Farra d'Isonzo	·	2.7 km	MPC · JPL
43843 Cleynaerts	1993 NC_{2}	Cleynaerts	July 12, 1993	La Silla	E. W. Elst	CLO	5.5 km	MPC · JPL
43844 Rowling	1993 OX_{2}	Rowling	July 25, 1993	Manastash Ridge	Hammergren, M.	·	3.9 km	MPC · JPL
43845	1993 OS_{9}	—	July 20, 1993	La Silla	E. W. Elst	·	3.1 km	MPC · JPL
43846	1993 PV_{8}	—	August 15, 1993	Caussols	E. W. Elst, C. Pollas	AGN	3.4 km	MPC · JPL
43847	1993 QQ_{5}	—	August 17, 1993	Caussols	E. W. Elst	NEM	5.9 km	MPC · JPL
43848	1993 QP_{9}	—	August 20, 1993	La Silla	E. W. Elst	HOF	5.8 km	MPC · JPL
43849	1993 RB_{11}	—	September 14, 1993	La Silla	H. Debehogne, E. W. Elst	GEF	3.2 km	MPC · JPL
43850	1993 SB_{14}	—	September 16, 1993	La Silla	H. Debehogne, E. W. Elst	·	5.5 km	MPC · JPL
43851 Takemasa	1993 TL_{1}	Takemasa	October 15, 1993	Kitami	K. Endate, K. Watanabe	·	2.8 km	MPC · JPL
43852	1993 TH_{28}	—	October 9, 1993	La Silla	E. W. Elst	·	5.4 km	MPC · JPL
43853	1993 TM_{29}	—	October 9, 1993	La Silla	E. W. Elst	·	8.6 km	MPC · JPL
43854	1993 TO_{31}	—	October 9, 1993	La Silla	E. W. Elst	·	3.6 km	MPC · JPL
43855	1993 TX_{36}	—	October 9, 1993	La Silla	E. W. Elst	·	6.4 km	MPC · JPL
43856	1993 UV_{4}	—	October 20, 1993	La Silla	E. W. Elst	·	4.9 km	MPC · JPL
43857 Tanijinzan	1993 VP_{2}	Tanijinzan	November 15, 1993	Geisei	T. Seki	slow	13 km	MPC · JPL
43858	1994 AT	—	January 4, 1994	Oizumi	T. Kobayashi	·	1.7 km	MPC · JPL
43859 Naoyayano	1994 AN_{15}	Naoyayano	January 9, 1994	Oizumi	T. Kobayashi, Fujii, H.	·	9.6 km	MPC · JPL
43860	1994 CQ_{9}	—	February 7, 1994	La Silla	E. W. Elst	·	12 km	MPC · JPL
43861	1994 CT_{13}	—	February 8, 1994	La Silla	E. W. Elst	V	1.6 km	MPC · JPL
43862	1994 EK_{1}	—	March 6, 1994	Oizumi	T. Kobayashi	V	2.8 km	MPC · JPL
43863	1994 EU_{6}	—	March 9, 1994	Caussols	E. W. Elst	·	11 km	MPC · JPL
43864	1994 GM_{3}	—	April 6, 1994	Kitt Peak	Spacewatch	·	4.2 km	MPC · JPL
43865	1994 PX_{9}	—	August 10, 1994	La Silla	E. W. Elst	·	2.3 km	MPC · JPL
43866	1994 PG_{19}	—	August 12, 1994	La Silla	E. W. Elst	·	2.5 km	MPC · JPL
43867	1994 PO_{28}	—	August 12, 1994	La Silla	E. W. Elst	·	2.4 km	MPC · JPL
43868	1994 PL_{35}	—	August 10, 1994	La Silla	E. W. Elst	·	2.7 km	MPC · JPL
43869	1994 RD_{11}	—	September 10, 1994	Siding Spring	R. H. McNaught	H	1.3 km	MPC · JPL
43870 Andokazuko	1994 TX	Andokazuko	October 2, 1994	Kitami	K. Endate, K. Watanabe	·	3.4 km	MPC · JPL
43871	1994 TW_{15}	—	October 13, 1994	Dossobuono	Madonna di Dossobuono	(5)	3.9 km	MPC · JPL
43872	1994 UL_{9}	—	October 28, 1994	Kitt Peak	Spacewatch	·	2.7 km	MPC · JPL
43873	1994 VD	—	November 1, 1994	Oizumi	T. Kobayashi	ADE	5.7 km	MPC · JPL
43874	1994 VZ_{6}	—	November 7, 1994	Kushiro	S. Ueda, H. Kaneda	(5)	4.2 km	MPC · JPL
43875	1994 WT_{3}	—	November 24, 1994	Kiyosato	S. Otomo	·	5.4 km	MPC · JPL
43876	1994 XV_{4}	—	December 9, 1994	Oizumi	T. Kobayashi	EUN	4.7 km	MPC · JPL
43877	1995 BP_{11}	—	January 29, 1995	Kitt Peak	Spacewatch	·	4.8 km	MPC · JPL
43878	1995 BS_{11}	—	January 29, 1995	Kitt Peak	Spacewatch	KOR	3.7 km	MPC · JPL
43879	1995 CN_{6}	—	February 1, 1995	Kitt Peak	Spacewatch	·	4.0 km	MPC · JPL
43880	1995 CX_{7}	—	February 2, 1995	Kitt Peak	Spacewatch	·	2.1 km	MPC · JPL
43881 Cerreto	1995 DA_{13}	Cerreto	February 25, 1995	Cima Ekar	M. Tombelli, C. Casacci	·	2.1 km	MPC · JPL
43882 Maurivicoli	1995 EM_{1}	Maurivicoli	March 7, 1995	San Marcello	L. Tesi, A. Boattini	V	1.5 km	MPC · JPL
43883	1995 EK_{2}	—	March 1, 1995	Kitt Peak	Spacewatch	KOR	2.7 km	MPC · JPL
43884	1995 FZ_{7}	—	March 25, 1995	Kitt Peak	Spacewatch	·	3.5 km	MPC · JPL
43885	1995 FJ_{9}	—	March 26, 1995	Kitt Peak	Spacewatch	·	2.6 km	MPC · JPL
43886	1995 GR_{7}	—	April 3, 1995	Xinglong	SCAP	·	1.6 km	MPC · JPL
43887	1995 OS_{4}	—	July 22, 1995	Kitt Peak	Spacewatch	·	2.6 km	MPC · JPL
43888	1995 OV_{8}	—	July 27, 1995	Kitt Peak	Spacewatch	·	1.8 km	MPC · JPL
43889 Osawatakaomi	1995 QH	Osawatakaomi	August 17, 1995	Nanyo	T. Okuni	·	3.4 km	MPC · JPL
43890 Katiaottani	1995 QT_{3}	Katiaottani	August 31, 1995	Bologna	San Vittore	·	1.6 km	MPC · JPL
43891	1995 SQ_{1}	—	September 21, 1995	Catalina Station	T. B. Spahr	PHO	4.6 km	MPC · JPL
43892	1995 SG_{21}	—	September 19, 1995	Kitt Peak	Spacewatch	·	3.4 km	MPC · JPL
43893	1995 ST_{32}	—	September 21, 1995	Kitt Peak	Spacewatch	·	2.0 km	MPC · JPL
43894	1995 TP	—	October 12, 1995	Sudbury	D. di Cicco	·	3.0 km	MPC · JPL
43895	1995 UC_{4}	—	October 20, 1995	Oizumi	T. Kobayashi	NYS	2.1 km	MPC · JPL
43896	1995 UL_{4}	—	October 20, 1995	Oizumi	T. Kobayashi	V	3.6 km	MPC · JPL
43897	1995 VC	—	November 1, 1995	Oizumi	T. Kobayashi	NYS	2.6 km	MPC · JPL
43898	1995 VN	—	November 2, 1995	Oizumi	T. Kobayashi	NYS ·	3.1 km	MPC · JPL
43899 Kobayashihiroki	1995 VH_{1}	Kobayashihiroki	November 15, 1995	Kitami	K. Endate, K. Watanabe	·	3.1 km	MPC · JPL
43900	1995 VH_{2}	—	November 13, 1995	Nachi-Katsuura	Y. Shimizu, T. Urata	NYS	4.1 km	MPC · JPL

== 43901–44000 ==
back to top

Designation			Discovery			Properties		Ref
Permanent	Provisional	Named after	Date	Site	Discoverer(s)	Category	Diam.	Ref
43901	1995 VX_{2}	—	November 14, 1995	Kitt Peak	Spacewatch	NYS	2.2 km	MPC · JPL
43902	1995 VX_{4}	—	November 14, 1995	Kitt Peak	Spacewatch	·	4.7 km	MPC · JPL
43903	1995 WC	—	November 16, 1995	Oizumi	T. Kobayashi	·	3.5 km	MPC · JPL
43904	1995 WO	—	November 16, 1995	Oohira	T. Urata	slow	4.0 km	MPC · JPL
43905	1995 WC_{1}	—	November 16, 1995	Kushiro	S. Ueda, H. Kaneda	NYS	3.2 km	MPC · JPL
43906	1995 WK_{4}	—	November 20, 1995	Oizumi	T. Kobayashi	NYS	2.1 km	MPC · JPL
43907	1995 WX_{4}	—	November 20, 1995	Oizumi	T. Kobayashi	·	3.6 km	MPC · JPL
43908 Hiraku	1995 WE_{7}	Hiraku	November 21, 1995	Nanyo	T. Okuni	·	3.1 km	MPC · JPL
43909	1995 WB_{9}	—	November 28, 1995	Nachi-Katsuura	Y. Shimizu, T. Urata	·	9.8 km	MPC · JPL
43910	1995 WA_{20}	—	November 17, 1995	Kitt Peak	Spacewatch	·	2.7 km	MPC · JPL
43911	1995 WF_{22}	—	November 17, 1995	Kitt Peak	Spacewatch	·	8.7 km	MPC · JPL
43912	1995 WR_{34}	—	November 20, 1995	Kitt Peak	Spacewatch	·	2.9 km	MPC · JPL
43913	1995 YT	—	December 17, 1995	Oizumi	T. Kobayashi	·	3.2 km	MPC · JPL
43914	1995 YC_{2}	—	December 19, 1995	Oizumi	T. Kobayashi	·	2.2 km	MPC · JPL
43915	1995 YT_{7}	—	December 16, 1995	Kitt Peak	Spacewatch	·	3.2 km	MPC · JPL
43916	1996 AP_{2}	—	January 13, 1996	Oizumi	T. Kobayashi	·	3.8 km	MPC · JPL
43917	1996 AM_{16}	—	January 13, 1996	Kitt Peak	Spacewatch	·	3.0 km	MPC · JPL
43918	1996 AE_{18}	—	January 13, 1996	Kitt Peak	Spacewatch	(5)	2.9 km	MPC · JPL
43919	1996 BG_{3}	—	January 18, 1996	Chichibu	N. Satō, T. Urata	·	3.4 km	MPC · JPL
43920	1996 CJ_{2}	—	February 12, 1996	Kushiro	S. Ueda, H. Kaneda	GEF	5.9 km	MPC · JPL
43921	1996 CW_{3}	—	February 10, 1996	Kitt Peak	Spacewatch	·	6.6 km	MPC · JPL
43922	1996 CE_{5}	—	February 10, 1996	Kitt Peak	Spacewatch	HNS	3.0 km	MPC · JPL
43923 Cosimonoccioli	1996 CX_{8}	Cosimonoccioli	February 14, 1996	Cima Ekar	U. Munari, M. Tombelli	·	3.6 km	MPC · JPL
43924 Martoni	1996 DV_{1}	Martoni	February 22, 1996	Stroncone	A. Vagnozzi	·	2.9 km	MPC · JPL
43925	1996 DB_{3}	—	February 27, 1996	Modra	L. Kornoš, P. Kolény	·	3.4 km	MPC · JPL
43926 Takanoatsushi	1996 EL_{1}	Takanoatsushi	March 10, 1996	Kitami	K. Endate, K. Watanabe	EUN	6.1 km	MPC · JPL
43927	1996 GN_{4}	—	April 11, 1996	Kitt Peak	Spacewatch	·	6.0 km	MPC · JPL
43928	1996 HE_{13}	—	April 17, 1996	La Silla	E. W. Elst	·	5.5 km	MPC · JPL
43929	1996 JO_{9}	—	May 13, 1996	Kitt Peak	Spacewatch	KOR	3.5 km	MPC · JPL
43930	1996 LR_{3}	—	June 15, 1996	Kitt Peak	Spacewatch	V	2.0 km	MPC · JPL
43931 Yoshimi	1996 PR_{9}	Yoshimi	August 9, 1996	Nanyo	T. Okuni	·	14 km	MPC · JPL
43932	1996 QH	—	August 16, 1996	Haleakala	NEAT	·	3.1 km	MPC · JPL
43933	1996 RX_{9}	—	September 7, 1996	Kitt Peak	Spacewatch	·	4.0 km	MPC · JPL
43934	1996 TC	—	October 1, 1996	Sudbury	D. di Cicco	·	8.6 km	MPC · JPL
43935 Danshechtman	1996 TF	Danshechtman	October 1, 1996	Colleverde	V. S. Casulli	·	2.6 km	MPC · JPL
43936	1996 TM_{11}	—	October 11, 1996	Kitami	K. Endate	URS	11 km	MPC · JPL
43937	1996 TS_{25}	—	October 6, 1996	Kitt Peak	Spacewatch	·	2.0 km	MPC · JPL
43938	1996 TH_{51}	—	October 5, 1996	La Silla	E. W. Elst	·	6.3 km	MPC · JPL
43939	1996 TT_{53}	—	October 5, 1996	La Silla	E. W. Elst	·	1.4 km	MPC · JPL
43940	1996 XY_{5}	—	December 7, 1996	Oizumi	T. Kobayashi	3:2	16 km	MPC · JPL
43941	1996 YP	—	December 20, 1996	Oizumi	T. Kobayashi	V	2.6 km	MPC · JPL
43942	1996 YX	—	December 20, 1996	Oizumi	T. Kobayashi	·	3.7 km	MPC · JPL
43943	1997 AV	—	January 2, 1997	Oizumi	T. Kobayashi	·	2.8 km	MPC · JPL
43944	1997 AW_{1}	—	January 3, 1997	Oizumi	T. Kobayashi	·	3.3 km	MPC · JPL
43945	1997 AS_{2}	—	January 3, 1997	Oizumi	T. Kobayashi	PHO	2.3 km	MPC · JPL
43946	1997 AR_{6}	—	January 7, 1997	Oohira	T. Urata	·	2.0 km	MPC · JPL
43947	1997 AE_{7}	—	January 9, 1997	Oizumi	T. Kobayashi	·	2.8 km	MPC · JPL
43948	1997 AU_{12}	—	January 10, 1997	Oizumi	T. Kobayashi	·	3.3 km	MPC · JPL
43949	1997 AU_{18}	—	January 9, 1997	Chichibu	N. Satō	·	2.9 km	MPC · JPL
43950	1997 BG_{1}	—	January 28, 1997	Oizumi	T. Kobayashi	·	4.7 km	MPC · JPL
43951	1997 BC_{5}	—	January 31, 1997	Kitt Peak	Spacewatch	NYS	2.9 km	MPC · JPL
43952	1997 BG_{7}	—	January 28, 1997	Xinglong	SCAP	·	2.6 km	MPC · JPL
43953	1997 CB_{1}	—	February 1, 1997	Oizumi	T. Kobayashi	·	2.2 km	MPC · JPL
43954 Chýnov	1997 CT_{5}	Chýnov	February 7, 1997	Kleť	M. Tichý, Z. Moravec	·	3.7 km	MPC · JPL
43955 Fixlmüller	1997 CE_{6}	Fixlmüller	February 6, 1997	Linz	E. Meyer, E. Obermair	·	1.9 km	MPC · JPL
43956 Elidoro	1997 CD_{7}	Elidoro	February 7, 1997	Sormano	P. Sicoli, F. Manca	NYS ·	3.9 km	MPC · JPL
43957 Invernizzi	1997 CL_{13}	Invernizzi	February 7, 1997	Sormano	P. Sicoli, F. Manca	RAF	3.5 km	MPC · JPL
43958	1997 CZ_{14}	—	February 6, 1997	Kitt Peak	Spacewatch	·	1.7 km	MPC · JPL
43959	1997 CB_{26}	—	February 12, 1997	Nachi-Katsuura	Y. Shimizu, T. Urata	·	6.3 km	MPC · JPL
43960	1997 CE_{27}	—	February 1, 1997	Kitt Peak	Spacewatch	·	2.4 km	MPC · JPL
43961	1997 ER_{5}	—	March 4, 1997	Kitt Peak	Spacewatch	·	2.8 km	MPC · JPL
43962	1997 EX_{13}	—	March 3, 1997	Kitt Peak	Spacewatch	·	2.8 km	MPC · JPL
43963	1997 EW_{14}	—	March 4, 1997	Kitt Peak	Spacewatch	·	1.5 km	MPC · JPL
43964	1997 EF_{23}	—	March 7, 1997	Xinglong	SCAP	·	3.5 km	MPC · JPL
43965	1997 EO_{32}	—	March 11, 1997	Kitt Peak	Spacewatch	·	4.0 km	MPC · JPL
43966	1997 EM_{36}	—	March 4, 1997	Socorro	LINEAR	·	3.1 km	MPC · JPL
43967	1997 FM_{2}	—	March 31, 1997	Socorro	LINEAR	·	3.4 km	MPC · JPL
43968	1997 FA_{5}	—	March 31, 1997	Socorro	LINEAR	·	3.6 km	MPC · JPL
43969	1997 GL	—	April 4, 1997	Haleakala	NEAT	·	2.8 km	MPC · JPL
43970	1997 GH_{1}	—	April 2, 1997	Kitt Peak	Spacewatch	(5)	3.6 km	MPC · JPL
43971 Gabzdyl	1997 GB_{4}	Gabzdyl	April 8, 1997	Kleť	M. Tichý, Z. Moravec	·	3.8 km	MPC · JPL
43972	1997 GM_{6}	—	April 2, 1997	Socorro	LINEAR	·	7.0 km	MPC · JPL
43973	1997 GE_{7}	—	April 2, 1997	Socorro	LINEAR	·	3.0 km	MPC · JPL
43974	1997 GY_{12}	—	April 3, 1997	Socorro	LINEAR	·	4.3 km	MPC · JPL
43975	1997 GF_{14}	—	April 3, 1997	Socorro	LINEAR	NYS	3.5 km	MPC · JPL
43976	1997 GQ_{14}	—	April 3, 1997	Socorro	LINEAR	·	3.7 km	MPC · JPL
43977	1997 GD_{17}	—	April 3, 1997	Socorro	LINEAR	·	2.3 km	MPC · JPL
43978	1997 GG_{17}	—	April 3, 1997	Socorro	LINEAR	·	2.4 km	MPC · JPL
43979	1997 GM_{17}	—	April 3, 1997	Socorro	LINEAR	·	2.8 km	MPC · JPL
43980	1997 GR_{20}	—	April 6, 1997	Socorro	LINEAR	·	1.7 km	MPC · JPL
43981	1997 GM_{21}	—	April 6, 1997	Socorro	LINEAR	·	4.0 km	MPC · JPL
43982	1997 GA_{32}	—	April 15, 1997	Xinglong	SCAP	·	4.0 km	MPC · JPL
43983	1997 GR_{35}	—	April 6, 1997	Socorro	LINEAR	·	3.9 km	MPC · JPL
43984	1997 HR_{7}	—	April 30, 1997	Socorro	LINEAR	·	4.2 km	MPC · JPL
43985	1997 HQ_{8}	—	April 30, 1997	Socorro	LINEAR	·	2.6 km	MPC · JPL
43986	1997 HF_{9}	—	April 30, 1997	Socorro	LINEAR	·	2.9 km	MPC · JPL
43987	1997 JR_{9}	—	May 6, 1997	Kitt Peak	Spacewatch	EUN	2.9 km	MPC · JPL
43988	1997 KQ_{3}	—	May 31, 1997	Kitt Peak	Spacewatch	·	5.0 km	MPC · JPL
43989	1997 LG_{4}	—	June 9, 1997	Lake Clear	Williams, K. A.	·	6.1 km	MPC · JPL
43990	1997 LN_{4}	—	June 7, 1997	Kitt Peak	Spacewatch	LEO	5.8 km	MPC · JPL
43991	1997 MF_{10}	—	June 28, 1997	Kitt Peak	Spacewatch	·	7.4 km	MPC · JPL
43992	1997 NP	—	July 1, 1997	Kitt Peak	Spacewatch	·	4.9 km	MPC · JPL
43993 Mariola	1997 OK	Mariola	July 26, 1997	Sormano	P. Sicoli, A. Testa	·	7.0 km	MPC · JPL
43994	1997 PF_{3}	—	August 11, 1997	Modra	A. Galád, Pravda, A.	·	4.4 km	MPC · JPL
43995	1997 PY_{5}	—	August 14, 1997	Haleakala	AMOS	·	3.5 km	MPC · JPL
43996	1997 QH	—	August 22, 1997	Yatsuka	H. Abe	·	4.3 km	MPC · JPL
43997	1997 QX	—	August 29, 1997	Cloudcroft	W. Offutt	·	3.7 km	MPC · JPL
43998 Nanyoshino	1997 QB_{3}	Nanyoshino	August 28, 1997	Nanyo	T. Okuni	·	14 km	MPC · JPL
43999 Gramigna	1997 QC_{3}	Gramigna	August 31, 1997	Pianoro	V. Goretti	·	3.0 km	MPC · JPL
44000 Lucka	1997 RB	Lucka	September 1, 1997	Kleť	Z. Moravec	·	7.7 km	MPC · JPL

back to top

== See also ==
- Meanings of minor-planet names: 43001–44000
