= Meanings of minor-planet names: 43001–44000 =

As minor planet discoveries are confirmed, they are given a permanent number by the IAU's Minor Planet Center (MPC), and the discoverers can then submit names for them, following the IAU's naming conventions. The list below concerns those minor planets in the specified number-range that have received names, and explains the meanings of those names.

Official naming citations of newly named small Solar System bodies are approved and published in a bulletin by IAU's Working Group for Small Bodies Nomenclature (WGSBN). Before May 2021, citations were published in MPC's Minor Planet Circulars for many decades. Recent citations can also be found on the JPL Small-Body Database (SBDB). Until his death in 2016, German astronomer Lutz D. Schmadel compiled these citations into the Dictionary of Minor Planet Names (DMP) and regularly updated the collection.

Based on Paul Herget's The Names of the Minor Planets, Schmadel also researched the unclear origin of numerous asteroids, most of which had been named prior to World War II. This article incorporates text from this source, which is in the public domain: SBDB New namings may only be added to this list below after official publication as the preannouncement of names is condemned. The WGSBN publishes a comprehensive guideline for the naming rules of non-cometary small Solar System bodies.

== 43001–43100 ==
| Named minor planet | Provisional | This minor planet was named for... | Ref · Catalog |
|---|---|---|---|
| 43025 Valusha | 1999 VW_{12} | Valentina I. Ipatova-Artioukhova (born 1954), Russian hydrobiologist | JPL · 43025 |
| 43027 Minusio | 1999 VA_{23} | Minusio, a small town in the Canton of Ticino in Switzerland. | JPL · 43027 |
| 43028 Gnosca | 1999 VE_{23} | Gnosca, a small town in the Canton of Ticino in Switzerland. | JPL · 43028 |
| 43081 Stephenschwartz | 1999 VA_{199} | Stephen Schwartz (born 1980) is a postdoctoral research associate at the Lunar and Planetary Laboratory (Tucson, AZ). He specializes in orbital dynamics, planetary astronomy, planetary surfaces, small bodies, and space situational awareness. | IAU · 43081 |
| 43083 Frankconrad | 1999 WR | Frank Conrad (1874–1941), American amateur astronomer, past president of the Baton Rouge Astronomical Society, friend of the discoverer | JPL · 43083 |
| 43087 Castegna | 1999 WW_{8} | Local dialect name for Castanea sativa around the area of Gnosca Observatory, where the object was discovered | IAU · 43087 |

== 43101–43200 ==
back to top

| Named minor planet | Provisional | This minor planet was named for... | Ref · Catalog |
|---|---|---|---|
| 43188 Zouxiaoduan | 1999 XP_{234} | Xiao-duan Zou (born 1983) is a Chinese research scientist at the Planetary Science Institute (Tucson, Arizona). She studies physical properties of the surfaces of the Moon, asteroids and cometary nuclei. She also worked for the Chinese Lunar Exploration Project (Chang'e 1 to Chang'e 5). | IAU · 43188 |
| 43193 Secinaro | 2000 AW_{4} | Secinaro, L'Aquila, Italy, location of what is probably the first Italian meteoric impact crater discovery (dating to the fourth or fifth century) | JPL · 43193 |

== 43201–43300 ==
back to top

| Named minor planet | Provisional | This minor planet was named for... | Ref · Catalog |
|---|---|---|---|
| 43212 Katosawao | 2000 AL_{113} | Sawao Katō (born 1946) competed in three Olympics from 1968 to 1976, winning twelve medals in gymnastics, including eight gold medals, the most for any Japanese Olympic athlete. He was inducted into the International Gymnastics Hall of Fame in 2001. | IAU · 43212 |
| 43224 Tonypensa | 2000 AP_{165} | Anthony Pensa (born 1943), American assistant director of the MIT Lincoln Laboratory, on the occasion of his retirement | JPL · 43224 |
| 43259 Wangzhenyi | 2000 CK_{104} | Wang Zhenyi (born 1924), hematologist-academician of the Chinese Academy of Engineering. | JPL · 43259 |
| 43282 Dougbock | 2000 EB_{140} | Doug Bock (born 1956) is well known in amateur astronomy in the midwest U.S., having received numerous awards and served as an officer in several clubs, including vice-chairman of the Great Lakes Region of the Astronomical League from 1980 to 1982. He is an avid observer and imager from his Boon Hill Observatory in Michigan. | JPL · 43282 |
| 43283 Robinbock | 2000 EC_{143} | Robin Bock (born 1957) is a Michigan amateur astronomer who served as treasurer of the Warren Astronomical Society from 1979 to 1980 and then as Vice Chairperson and Secretary of the Great Lakes Region of the Astronomical League. | JPL · 43283 |
| 43293 Banting | 2000 GU_{1} | Frederick Banting (1891–1941), Canadian medical doctor, discoverer of insulin | JPL · 43293 |

== 43301–43400 ==
back to top

| Named minor planet | Provisional | This minor planet was named for... | Ref · Catalog |
|---|---|---|---|
| 43305 Camillebibles | 2000 GH_{142} | Camille D. Bibles (b. 1961), a US Magistrate Judge. | IAU · 43305 |
| 43368 Rodrigoleiva | 2000 VZ_{62} | Rodrigo Leiva (born 1980) is a postdoctoral associate at Southwest Research Institute (Boulder, CO). His studies include Pluto, trans-Neptunian objects, centaurs, and studying small-body rings through stellar occultations. | IAU · 43368 |

== 43401–43500 ==
back to top

| Named minor planet | Provisional | This minor planet was named for... | Ref · Catalog |
|---|---|---|---|
| 43414 Sfair | 2000 WS_{168} | Rafael Sfair (born 1984) is a professor at Universidade Estadual Paulista Julio de Mesquita Filho, Brazil. He has experience in numerical simulation and image analysis for Dynamical Astronomy, focusing on ring interaction and stability with different dissipative forces. | IAU · 43414 |
| 43436 Ansschut | 2000 YD_{42} | Ans Schut (born 1944) set an Olympic record in speed skating at the 1968 Olympics as a member of the Netherlands Olympic team. She set several world records in international events the following year. She retired from competition in 1971. | IAU · 43436 |
| 43500 Chandler | 2001 CP_{22} | Colin Orion Chandler (b. 1978), an American astronomer. | IAU · 43500 |

== 43501–43600 ==
back to top

| Named minor planet | Provisional | This minor planet was named for... | Ref · Catalog |
|---|---|---|---|
| 43501 Oldroyd | 2001 CW_{22} | William J. Oldroyd (born 1992), American planetary scientist, postdoctoral Scholar at Northern Arizona University | IAU · 43501 |
| 43511 Cima Ekar | 2001 CP_{48} | Stazione osservativa di Asiago Cima Ekar (Cima Ekar Observing Station), a.k.a. Osservatorio Astronomico di Monte Ekar, the largest astronomical facility of Italy | JPL · 43511 |
| 43574 Joyharjo | 2001 FU_{192} | Joy Harjo, musician and 23rd United States Poet Laureate. Her poetry appeared on the plaque carried by NASA's Lucy space probe. | IAU · 43574 |
| 43597 Changshaopo | 2001 QT_{163} | Changshaopo (born 1932) is a Marist brother who served as the principal of St. Francis Xavier's School in Hong Kong from 1974 to 1997. He devoted himself to educating the younger generation, practicing the school's motto Integrity and Universal Love | JPL · 43597 |

== 43601–43700 ==
back to top

| Named minor planet | Provisional | This minor planet was named for... | Ref · Catalog |
|---|---|---|---|
| 43605 Gakuho | 2001 WD_{16} | Aizu Gakuho is a senior and junior high school in Aizuwakamatsu city in Fukushima prefecture, Japan, founded in 1924. Gakuho means wisdom and a phoenix flying in space. | JPL · 43605 |
| 43657 Bobmiller | 2002 ES_{110} | Robert Donald Miller, an astronomer with Michigan State University's on-campus observatory for three decades | JPL · 43657 |
| 43667 Dumlupınar | 2002 GO_{1} | Dumlupınar, the Turkish submarine which, while crossing the Dardanelles on 1953 April 4, collided with the Swedish freighter Naboland and sank, killing all 81 men aboard | JPL · 43667 |
| 43669 Winterthur | 2002 GA_{10} | The city of Winterthur, Switzerland, birthplace of the discoverer Markus Griesser and home of the Eschenberg Observatory | JPL · 43669 |

== 43701–43800 ==
back to top

| Named minor planet | Provisional | This minor planet was named for... | Ref · Catalog |
|---|---|---|---|
| 43706 Iphiklos | 1416 T-2 | Iphiklos, father of the Trojan war Greek hero Podarkes of Phylake | JPL · 43706 |
| 43722 Carloseduardo | 1968 OB | Carlos Eduardo López (born 1953), an Argentine astronomer. | JPL · 43722 |
| 43724 Pechstein | 1975 UY | Max Pechstein (1881–1955), German painter, leading member of the German expressionists known as "Die Brücke" | JPL · 43724 |
| 43751 Asam | 1982 UD_{4} | The Bavarian family of fresco painters, stucco sculptors, and architects: father Hans Georg Asam (1649–1711) and his sons Cosmas Damian Asam (1686–1739) and Egid Quirin Asam (1692–1750) | JPL · 43751 |
| 43752 Maryosipova | 1982 US_{5} | Maria Yur'evna Osipova (born 1977), younger daughter of the discoverer | JPL · 43752 |
| 43753 Okadayoshirou | 1982 VN_{3} | Yoshirou Okada (1930–2014), Japanese researcher of ancient and modern calendars. | JPL · 43753 |
| 43763 Russert | 1987 KF_{1} | Tim Russert (1950–2008), an author, Washington bureau chief and political analyst for NBC News | JPL · 43763 |
| 43767 Permeke | 1988 CP_{5} | Constant Permeke, Belgian painter and sculptor | JPL · 43767 |
| 43768 Lynevans | 1988 CH_{7} | Lyn Evans (born 1945), a Welsh scientist and project leader of the Large Hadron Collider at CERN. | JPL · 43768 |
| 43775 Tiepolo | 1989 CA_{6} | Giovanni Battista Tiepolo (1696–1770), Italian Rococo painter and printmaker | JPL · 43775 |
| 43783 Svyatitelpyotr | 1989 UX_{7} | Saint Pyotr (Svyatitel Pyotr; died 1326) was an outstanding statesman and orthodox religious hierarch, talented icon painter and writer. In 1308–1326 he was the Metropolitan of Kiev and All Russia and in 1325 he moved the Metropolitan See from Vladimir to Moscow. He founded the Vysokopetrovsky Monastery in 1315. | JPL · 43783 |
| 43790 Ferdinandbraun | 1990 TY_{3} | Karl Ferdinand Braun (1850–1918), a German physicist, inventor of the "Braun tube", the forerunner of the television tube, co-winner of the 1909 Nobel Prize in physics for wireless telegraphy | JPL · 43790 |
| 43792 Nobutakagoto | 1990 VY_{1} | Nobutaka Goto (b. 1966) is engaged in the production of telescopes and planetariums. He promotes astronomy among the public by organizing public lectures and viewing nights. || IAU · 43792 | |
| 43793 Mackey | 1990 VK_{7} | Lance Mackey (born 1970), American dog musher, first to win the 1000-mile Yukon Quest and the 1100-mile Iditarod back to back (in 2007) | JPL · 43793 |
| 43794 Yabetakemoto | 1990 YP | Akihiko Yabe (born 1939) and Akikazu Takemoto (born 1941) are Japan's leading Masters Games swimmers | JPL · 43794 |

== 43801–43900 ==
back to top

| Named minor planet | Provisional | This minor planet was named for... | Ref · Catalog |
|---|---|---|---|
| 43803 Wakakinosakura | 1991 RH_{2} | Wakakinosakura is a kind of wild cherry tree discovered in 1889 by Japanese botanist Tomitaro Makino at Ogawa Castle in his hometown of Sakawa, Kochi prefecture. | IAU · 43803 |
| 43804 Peterting | 1991 RL_{4} | Peter M. Ting (born 1948), American anesthesiologist | JPL · 43804 |
| 43806 Augustepiccard | 1991 RG_{7} | Auguste Piccard (1884–1962), Swiss physicist, explorer of the upper stratosphere and the depths of the ocean | JPL · 43806 |
| 43813 Kühner | 1991 TQ_{2} | Stefan Kühner (born 1970), a German electronics technician, is an enthusiastic amateur astronomer and experienced short-wave radio operator | JPL · 43813 |
| 43841 Marcustacitus | 1993 HB | Marcus Claudius Tacitus (c. 200–276), Roman emperor | JPL · 43841 |
| 43843 Cleynaerts | 1993 NC_{2} | Nicolas Cleynaerts (1495–1542), a Flemish humanist | JPL · 43843 |
| 43844 Rowling | 1993 OX_{2} | J. K. Rowling (born 1965), British author, best known for the Harry Potter series | JPL · 43844 |
| 43851 Takemasa | 1993 TL_{1} | Shinji Takemasa, Japanese amateur astronomer. | IAU · 43851 |
| 43857 Tanijinzan | 1993 VP_{2} | Tani Jinzan (1663–1718) was a Japanese astronomer and calendrical scholar in Tosa (modern-day Kochi prefecture) during Japan's Edo period. By using observations of the Sun, the Moon, and the constellations, he accurately determined the latitude of Kochi Castle in 1694. | IAU · 43857 |
| 43859 Naoyayano | 1994 AN_{15} | Naoya (born 1998) and Ayano Fujii (born 2001), children of Hiroshi Fujii, who co-discovered this minor planet. | JPL · 43859 |
| 43870 Andokazuko | 1994 TX | Kazuko Ando, part-time Japanese lecturer at Okayama University of Science. | IAU · 43870 |
| 43881 Cerreto | 1995 DA_{13} | Cerreto d'Asti, Piedmont, Italy, home to the Cerreto d'Asti Astronomical Observatory | JPL · 43881 |
| 43882 Maurivicoli | 1995 EM_{1} | Maurizio Vicoli (born 1964), Italian philosopher and astronomer | JPL · 43882 |
| 43889 Osawatakaomi | 1995 QH | Osawa Takaomi (born 1957), Japanese pharmacist and amateur astronomer, independent discoverer of comet C/1996 B1 | JPL · 43889 |
| 43890 Katiaottani | 1995 QT_{3} | Katia Ottani (1959–2006), Italian elementary-school teacher and friend of Ermes Colombini, who co-discovered this minor planet | JPL · 43890 |
| 43899 Kobayashihiroki | 1995 VH_{1} | Hiroki Kobayashi, Japanese amateur astronomer | IAU · 43899 |

== 43901–44000 ==
back to top

| Named minor planet | Provisional | This minor planet was named for... | Ref · Catalog |
|---|---|---|---|
| 43908 Hiraku | 1995 WE_{7} | Hiraku Togashi (born 1955) became a member of the Yamagata Astronomical Society in 1998 and actively popularizes astronomy. | JPL · 43908 |
| 43923 Cosimonoccioli | 1996 CX_{8} | Cosimo Noccioli (born 2001), an Italian amateur astronomer who is a member of the astronomy club at Montelupo (Italian: Gruppo Astrofili Montelupo). | IAU · 43923 |
| 43924 Martoni | 1996 DV_{1} | Aurora Martoni (born 2012), granddaughter of Antonio Vagnozzi who discovered this minor planet | JPL · 43924 |
| 43926 Takanoatsushi | 1996 EL_{1} | Atsushi Takano, Japanese amateur astronomer. | IAU · 43926 |
| 43931 Yoshimi | 1996 PR_{9} | Yoshimi Takahashi (1925–2005), Japanese amateur astronomer who contributed to the establishment of the Nanyo Astronomical Lovers Club and the Nanyo Citizen's Astronomical Observatory | JPL · 43931 |
| 43935 Danshechtman | 1996 TF | Dan Shechtman (born 1941) is an Israeli physicist who won the Nobel Prize for chemistry in 2011 | JPL · 43935 |
| 43954 Chýnov | 1997 CT_{5} | The Czech town of Chýnov in south Bohemia, site of a well-known cave discovered in 1863 | MPC · 43954 |
| 43955 Fixlmüller | 1997 CE_{6} | Placidus Fixlmillner (Fixlmüller; 1721–1791), Austrian astronomer | JPL · 43955 |
| 43956 Elidoro | 1997 CD_{7} | Claudio Elidoro (born 1956), Italian astronomer and popularizer | JPL · 43956 |
| 43957 Invernizzi | 1997 CL_{13} | Luca Invernizzi (born 1966), Italian author and amateur astronomer, founder of the Astronomy Club at Valtellina (Italian: Associazione Astrofili Valtellinesi and co-promoter of the Giuseppe Piazzi Observatory (C63) | JPL · 43957 |
| 43971 Gabzdyl | 1997 GB_{4} | Pavel Gabzdyl (born 1974), Czech planetary astronomer and author | JPL · 43971 |
| 43993 Mariola | 1997 OK | Mariola Magnoni Tieghi (born 1934), former president of the Como Inner Wheel Club | MPC · 43993 |
| 43998 Nanyoshino | 1997 QB_{3} | Nanyo Yosginogawa River flows through the center of Nanyo City, Yamagata prefecture, and joins Mogami River. | JPL · 43998 |
| 43999 Gramigna | 1997 QC_{3} | Paolo Gramigna (born 1946), Italian amateur astronomer at the Livergnano Observatory (436) | JPL · 43999 |
| 44000 Lucka | 1997 RB | Lucie Glöcknerová (born 2012) is the discoverer's younger daughter. | IAU · 44000 |

back to top

| Preceded by 42,001–43,000 | Meanings of minor-planet names List of minor planets: 43,001–44,000 | Succeeded by 44,001–45,000 |
