= Martin McKenna =

Martin McKenna may refer to:

- Marty McKenna, British reality television personality
- Martin McKenna (politician), brewer and politician in Victoria, Australia
- Martin McKenna (artist), British artist and illustrator
- Martin McKenna (astronomer) (born 1978), after whom the asteroid 42531 McKenna is named
