= List of minor planets: 42001–43000 =

The following is a partial list of minor planets, running from minor-planet number 42001 through 43000, inclusive. The primary data for this and other partial lists is based on JPL's "Small-Body Orbital Elements" and data available from the Minor Planet Center. Critical list information is also provided by the MPC, unless otherwise specified from Lowell Observatory. A detailed description of the table's columns and additional sources are given on the main page including a complete list of every page in this series, and a statistical break-up on the dynamical classification of minor planets.

Also see the summary list of all named bodies in numerical and alphabetical order, and the corresponding naming citations for the number range of this particular list. New namings may only be added to this list after official publication, as the preannouncement of names is condemned by the Working Group for Small Bodies Nomenclature of the International Astronomical Union.

Near-Earth obj.	MBA (inner)	MBA (outer)	Centaur
Mars-crosser	MBA (middle)	Jupiter trojan	Trans-Neptunian obj.
Unclassified

== 42001–42100 ==
Designation			Discovery			Properties		Ref
Permanent	Provisional	Named after	Date	Site	Discoverer(s)	Category	Diam.	Ref
42001	2000 YW_{46}	—	December 30, 2000	Socorro	LINEAR	·	2.5 km	MPC · JPL
42002	2000 YU_{47}	—	December 30, 2000	Socorro	LINEAR	·	2.8 km	MPC · JPL
42003	2000 YJ_{48}	—	December 30, 2000	Socorro	LINEAR	·	2.7 km	MPC · JPL
42004	2000 YJ_{49}	—	December 30, 2000	Socorro	LINEAR	·	2.9 km	MPC · JPL
42005	2000 YW_{49}	—	December 30, 2000	Socorro	LINEAR	PAD	4.2 km	MPC · JPL
42006	2000 YA_{50}	—	December 30, 2000	Socorro	LINEAR	NYS	5.8 km	MPC · JPL
42007	2000 YG_{50}	—	December 30, 2000	Socorro	LINEAR	·	3.5 km	MPC · JPL
42008	2000 YJ_{50}	—	December 30, 2000	Socorro	LINEAR	·	2.6 km	MPC · JPL
42009	2000 YM_{50}	—	December 30, 2000	Socorro	LINEAR	·	6.3 km	MPC · JPL
42010	2000 YX_{58}	—	December 30, 2000	Socorro	LINEAR	·	3.5 km	MPC · JPL
42011	2000 YS_{59}	—	December 30, 2000	Socorro	LINEAR	·	2.0 km	MPC · JPL
42012	2000 YC_{60}	—	December 30, 2000	Socorro	LINEAR	EOS	5.2 km	MPC · JPL
42013	2000 YL_{61}	—	December 30, 2000	Socorro	LINEAR	·	3.4 km	MPC · JPL
42014	2000 YM_{61}	—	December 30, 2000	Socorro	LINEAR	EOS	4.4 km	MPC · JPL
42015	2000 YM_{65}	—	December 16, 2000	Kitt Peak	Spacewatch	·	4.7 km	MPC · JPL
42016	2000 YZ_{68}	—	December 30, 2000	Socorro	LINEAR	·	3.8 km	MPC · JPL
42017	2000 YU_{72}	—	December 30, 2000	Socorro	LINEAR	V	2.2 km	MPC · JPL
42018	2000 YK_{78}	—	December 30, 2000	Socorro	LINEAR	·	6.1 km	MPC · JPL
42019	2000 YE_{79}	—	December 30, 2000	Socorro	LINEAR	·	3.4 km	MPC · JPL
42020	2000 YP_{79}	—	December 30, 2000	Socorro	LINEAR	·	4.5 km	MPC · JPL
42021	2000 YJ_{80}	—	December 30, 2000	Socorro	LINEAR	·	4.4 km	MPC · JPL
42022	2000 YS_{81}	—	December 30, 2000	Socorro	LINEAR	·	3.1 km	MPC · JPL
42023	2000 YW_{81}	—	December 30, 2000	Socorro	LINEAR	·	2.0 km	MPC · JPL
42024	2000 YX_{82}	—	December 30, 2000	Socorro	LINEAR	·	3.7 km	MPC · JPL
42025	2000 YL_{84}	—	December 30, 2000	Socorro	LINEAR	·	6.2 km	MPC · JPL
42026	2000 YF_{86}	—	December 30, 2000	Socorro	LINEAR	·	2.7 km	MPC · JPL
42027	2000 YL_{86}	—	December 30, 2000	Socorro	LINEAR	V	2.0 km	MPC · JPL
42028	2000 YT_{88}	—	December 30, 2000	Socorro	LINEAR	V	2.0 km	MPC · JPL
42029	2000 YV_{88}	—	December 30, 2000	Socorro	LINEAR	·	7.6 km	MPC · JPL
42030	2000 YA_{89}	—	December 30, 2000	Socorro	LINEAR	·	6.9 km	MPC · JPL
42031	2000 YJ_{89}	—	December 30, 2000	Socorro	LINEAR	NYS	2.8 km	MPC · JPL
42032	2000 YV_{89}	—	December 30, 2000	Socorro	LINEAR	·	3.7 km	MPC · JPL
42033	2000 YH_{95}	—	December 30, 2000	Socorro	LINEAR	·	3.0 km	MPC · JPL
42034	2000 YD_{96}	—	December 30, 2000	Socorro	LINEAR	KOR	3.7 km	MPC · JPL
42035	2000 YG_{96}	—	December 30, 2000	Socorro	LINEAR	·	2.8 km	MPC · JPL
42036	2000 YP_{96}	—	December 30, 2000	Socorro	LINEAR	L4	20 km	MPC · JPL
42037	2000 YQ_{96}	—	December 30, 2000	Socorro	LINEAR	THM	6.4 km	MPC · JPL
42038	2000 YO_{97}	—	December 30, 2000	Socorro	LINEAR	·	3.8 km	MPC · JPL
42039	2000 YN_{98}	—	December 30, 2000	Socorro	LINEAR	·	6.5 km	MPC · JPL
42040	2000 YS_{99}	—	December 30, 2000	Socorro	LINEAR	EOS	5.8 km	MPC · JPL
42041	2000 YB_{100}	—	December 30, 2000	Socorro	LINEAR	·	6.1 km	MPC · JPL
42042	2000 YR_{101}	—	December 28, 2000	Socorro	LINEAR	·	7.3 km	MPC · JPL
42043	2000 YB_{102}	—	December 28, 2000	Socorro	LINEAR	·	10 km	MPC · JPL
42044	2000 YF_{102}	—	December 28, 2000	Socorro	LINEAR	·	3.4 km	MPC · JPL
42045	2000 YJ_{103}	—	December 28, 2000	Socorro	LINEAR	·	10 km	MPC · JPL
42046	2000 YM_{103}	—	December 28, 2000	Socorro	LINEAR	·	2.3 km	MPC · JPL
42047	2000 YV_{105}	—	December 28, 2000	Socorro	LINEAR	EUN · fast	4.6 km	MPC · JPL
42048	2000 YE_{107}	—	December 30, 2000	Socorro	LINEAR	·	5.8 km	MPC · JPL
42049	2000 YG_{107}	—	December 30, 2000	Socorro	LINEAR	·	5.8 km	MPC · JPL
42050	2000 YN_{107}	—	December 30, 2000	Socorro	LINEAR	EOS	5.2 km	MPC · JPL
42051	2000 YX_{107}	—	December 30, 2000	Socorro	LINEAR	·	2.3 km	MPC · JPL
42052	2000 YH_{108}	—	December 30, 2000	Socorro	LINEAR	·	2.8 km	MPC · JPL
42053	2000 YO_{110}	—	December 30, 2000	Socorro	LINEAR	·	3.1 km	MPC · JPL
42054	2000 YA_{111}	—	December 30, 2000	Socorro	LINEAR	·	3.8 km	MPC · JPL
42055	2000 YB_{112}	—	December 30, 2000	Socorro	LINEAR	·	2.5 km	MPC · JPL
42056	2000 YF_{114}	—	December 30, 2000	Socorro	LINEAR	·	4.8 km	MPC · JPL
42057	2000 YW_{114}	—	December 30, 2000	Socorro	LINEAR	·	4.0 km	MPC · JPL
42058	2000 YF_{115}	—	December 30, 2000	Socorro	LINEAR	KOR	3.5 km	MPC · JPL
42059	2000 YG_{115}	—	December 30, 2000	Socorro	LINEAR	(5)	3.2 km	MPC · JPL
42060	2000 YX_{115}	—	December 30, 2000	Socorro	LINEAR	·	4.2 km	MPC · JPL
42061	2000 YE_{116}	—	December 30, 2000	Socorro	LINEAR	NYS	3.7 km	MPC · JPL
42062	2000 YR_{118}	—	December 28, 2000	Socorro	LINEAR	EUN	3.4 km	MPC · JPL
42063	2000 YS_{122}	—	December 28, 2000	Socorro	LINEAR	·	3.4 km	MPC · JPL
42064	2000 YE_{128}	—	December 29, 2000	Haleakala	NEAT	·	5.1 km	MPC · JPL
42065	2000 YJ_{128}	—	December 29, 2000	Haleakala	NEAT	·	3.9 km	MPC · JPL
42066	2000 YF_{129}	—	December 29, 2000	Haleakala	NEAT	·	3.1 km	MPC · JPL
42067	2000 YU_{131}	—	December 30, 2000	Socorro	LINEAR	·	5.7 km	MPC · JPL
42068	2000 YA_{133}	—	December 30, 2000	Anderson Mesa	LONEOS	CYB	15 km	MPC · JPL
42069	2000 YG_{135}	—	December 17, 2000	Anderson Mesa	LONEOS	·	3.6 km	MPC · JPL
42070	2000 YM_{136}	—	December 23, 2000	Socorro	LINEAR	fast	8.9 km	MPC · JPL
42071	2000 YS_{137}	—	December 23, 2000	Kitt Peak	Spacewatch	·	3.7 km	MPC · JPL
42072	2000 YS_{139}	—	December 27, 2000	Kitt Peak	Spacewatch	NYS	1.6 km	MPC · JPL
42073 Noreen	2001 AS_{1}	Noreen	January 2, 2001	Carbuncle Hill	Pray, D. P.	·	9.5 km	MPC · JPL
42074	2001 AV_{2}	—	January 2, 2001	Kitt Peak	Spacewatch	·	3.3 km	MPC · JPL
42075	2001 AL_{3}	—	January 2, 2001	Socorro	LINEAR	GEF	3.9 km	MPC · JPL
42076	2001 AQ_{4}	—	January 2, 2001	Socorro	LINEAR	LUT	10 km	MPC · JPL
42077	2001 AS_{4}	—	January 2, 2001	Socorro	LINEAR	EUN	4.4 km	MPC · JPL
42078	2001 AT_{4}	—	January 2, 2001	Socorro	LINEAR	·	3.5 km	MPC · JPL
42079	2001 AD_{7}	—	January 2, 2001	Socorro	LINEAR	·	3.3 km	MPC · JPL
42080	2001 AL_{7}	—	January 2, 2001	Socorro	LINEAR	·	4.9 km	MPC · JPL
42081	2001 AX_{7}	—	January 2, 2001	Socorro	LINEAR	·	3.2 km	MPC · JPL
42082	2001 AF_{11}	—	January 2, 2001	Socorro	LINEAR	·	13 km	MPC · JPL
42083	2001 AU_{11}	—	January 2, 2001	Socorro	LINEAR	·	6.1 km	MPC · JPL
42084	2001 AA_{12}	—	January 2, 2001	Socorro	LINEAR	·	3.6 km	MPC · JPL
42085	2001 AD_{12}	—	January 2, 2001	Socorro	LINEAR	·	2.0 km	MPC · JPL
42086	2001 AE_{13}	—	January 2, 2001	Socorro	LINEAR	·	2.4 km	MPC · JPL
42087	2001 AB_{14}	—	January 2, 2001	Socorro	LINEAR	TEL	3.5 km	MPC · JPL
42088	2001 AG_{15}	—	January 2, 2001	Socorro	LINEAR	·	5.6 km	MPC · JPL
42089	2001 AQ_{15}	—	January 2, 2001	Socorro	LINEAR	LIX	8.7 km	MPC · JPL
42090	2001 AF_{16}	—	January 2, 2001	Socorro	LINEAR	·	2.1 km	MPC · JPL
42091	2001 AV_{16}	—	January 2, 2001	Socorro	LINEAR	HNS	4.2 km	MPC · JPL
42092	2001 AU_{20}	—	January 3, 2001	Socorro	LINEAR	·	2.2 km	MPC · JPL
42093	2001 AO_{23}	—	January 3, 2001	Socorro	LINEAR	GEF	3.0 km	MPC · JPL
42094	2001 AO_{24}	—	January 4, 2001	Socorro	LINEAR	·	3.2 km	MPC · JPL
42095	2001 AY_{25}	—	January 6, 2001	Farpoint	Farpoint	·	6.3 km	MPC · JPL
42096	2001 AZ_{25}	—	January 6, 2001	Farpoint	Farpoint	TEL	4.7 km	MPC · JPL
42097	2001 AO_{28}	—	January 5, 2001	Socorro	LINEAR	(5)	3.9 km	MPC · JPL
42098	2001 AS_{29}	—	January 4, 2001	Socorro	LINEAR	·	2.7 km	MPC · JPL
42099	2001 AN_{30}	—	January 4, 2001	Socorro	LINEAR	·	2.6 km	MPC · JPL
42100	2001 AL_{31}	—	January 4, 2001	Socorro	LINEAR	·	3.4 km	MPC · JPL

== 42101–42200 ==
back to top

Designation			Discovery			Properties		Ref
Permanent	Provisional	Named after	Date	Site	Discoverer(s)	Category	Diam.	Ref
42101	2001 AA_{34}	—	January 4, 2001	Socorro	LINEAR	·	2.8 km	MPC · JPL
42102	2001 AF_{34}	—	January 4, 2001	Socorro	LINEAR	·	4.7 km	MPC · JPL
42103	2001 AO_{34}	—	January 4, 2001	Socorro	LINEAR	(1298)	8.5 km	MPC · JPL
42104	2001 AS_{35}	—	January 5, 2001	Socorro	LINEAR	EOS	5.2 km	MPC · JPL
42105	2001 AZ_{35}	—	January 5, 2001	Socorro	LINEAR	EOS	5.1 km	MPC · JPL
42106	2001 AB_{38}	—	January 5, 2001	Socorro	LINEAR	·	4.3 km	MPC · JPL
42107	2001 AF_{38}	—	January 5, 2001	Socorro	LINEAR	·	3.5 km	MPC · JPL
42108	2001 AM_{41}	—	January 3, 2001	Socorro	LINEAR	EOS	4.7 km	MPC · JPL
42109	2001 AX_{44}	—	January 15, 2001	Oizumi	T. Kobayashi	NYS	4.5 km	MPC · JPL
42110	2001 AC_{45}	—	January 15, 2001	Oizumi	T. Kobayashi	·	3.9 km	MPC · JPL
42111	2001 AZ_{46}	—	January 15, 2001	Socorro	LINEAR	PHO	3.1 km	MPC · JPL
42112 Hongkyumoon	2001 AF_{48}	Hongkyumoon	January 4, 2001	Anderson Mesa	LONEOS	·	11 km	MPC · JPL
42113 Jura	2001 AB_{49}	Jura	January 15, 2001	Vicques	M. Ory	·	4.5 km	MPC · JPL
42114	2001 BH_{4}	—	January 18, 2001	Socorro	LINEAR	L4	20 km	MPC · JPL
42115	2001 BO_{4}	—	January 18, 2001	Socorro	LINEAR	EUN	3.6 km	MPC · JPL
42116	2001 BY_{5}	—	January 18, 2001	Socorro	LINEAR	·	1.7 km	MPC · JPL
42117	2001 BD_{6}	—	January 19, 2001	Socorro	LINEAR	·	7.2 km	MPC · JPL
42118	2001 BO_{6}	—	January 19, 2001	Socorro	LINEAR	·	3.6 km	MPC · JPL
42119	2001 BP_{7}	—	January 19, 2001	Socorro	LINEAR	·	6.2 km	MPC · JPL
42120	2001 BU_{7}	—	January 19, 2001	Socorro	LINEAR	·	4.4 km	MPC · JPL
42121	2001 BW_{7}	—	January 19, 2001	Socorro	LINEAR	·	2.5 km	MPC · JPL
42122	2001 BC_{8}	—	January 19, 2001	Socorro	LINEAR	·	5.9 km	MPC · JPL
42123	2001 BY_{8}	—	January 19, 2001	Socorro	LINEAR	·	5.9 km	MPC · JPL
42124	2001 BA_{9}	—	January 19, 2001	Socorro	LINEAR	·	7.9 km	MPC · JPL
42125	2001 BE_{13}	—	January 21, 2001	Socorro	LINEAR	·	3.9 km	MPC · JPL
42126	2001 BC_{15}	—	January 21, 2001	Oizumi	T. Kobayashi	THM	7.6 km	MPC · JPL
42127	2001 BT_{15}	—	January 21, 2001	Oizumi	T. Kobayashi	·	7.3 km	MPC · JPL
42128	2001 BV_{15}	—	January 21, 2001	Oizumi	T. Kobayashi	EUN	4.5 km	MPC · JPL
42129	2001 BG_{17}	—	January 19, 2001	Socorro	LINEAR	·	7.4 km	MPC · JPL
42130	2001 BW_{19}	—	January 19, 2001	Socorro	LINEAR	·	4.7 km	MPC · JPL
42131	2001 BE_{21}	—	January 19, 2001	Socorro	LINEAR	EOS	4.9 km	MPC · JPL
42132	2001 BP_{24}	—	January 20, 2001	Socorro	LINEAR	·	9.3 km	MPC · JPL
42133	2001 BQ_{24}	—	January 20, 2001	Socorro	LINEAR	KOR	3.9 km	MPC · JPL
42134	2001 BO_{25}	—	January 20, 2001	Socorro	LINEAR	·	6.2 km	MPC · JPL
42135	2001 BK_{26}	—	January 20, 2001	Socorro	LINEAR	·	12 km	MPC · JPL
42136	2001 BM_{26}	—	January 20, 2001	Socorro	LINEAR	·	7.2 km	MPC · JPL
42137	2001 BO_{27}	—	January 20, 2001	Socorro	LINEAR	·	8.8 km	MPC · JPL
42138	2001 BP_{28}	—	January 20, 2001	Socorro	LINEAR	·	9.4 km	MPC · JPL
42139	2001 BQ_{29}	—	January 20, 2001	Socorro	LINEAR	EOS	5.4 km	MPC · JPL
42140	2001 BM_{31}	—	January 20, 2001	Socorro	LINEAR	·	6.6 km	MPC · JPL
42141	2001 BV_{31}	—	January 20, 2001	Socorro	LINEAR	·	7.6 km	MPC · JPL
42142	2001 BY_{32}	—	January 20, 2001	Socorro	LINEAR	·	8.5 km	MPC · JPL
42143	2001 BN_{37}	—	January 21, 2001	Socorro	LINEAR	EUN	2.9 km	MPC · JPL
42144	2001 BW_{40}	—	January 24, 2001	Socorro	LINEAR	·	7.6 km	MPC · JPL
42145	2001 BF_{41}	—	January 24, 2001	Socorro	LINEAR	EOS	4.3 km	MPC · JPL
42146	2001 BN_{42}	—	January 19, 2001	Socorro	LINEAR	L4	20 km	MPC · JPL
42147	2001 BW_{43}	—	January 19, 2001	Socorro	LINEAR	AEG	7.9 km	MPC · JPL
42148	2001 BC_{46}	—	January 21, 2001	Socorro	LINEAR	·	2.5 km	MPC · JPL
42149	2001 BQ_{48}	—	January 21, 2001	Socorro	LINEAR	EOS	3.4 km	MPC · JPL
42150	2001 BD_{53}	—	January 17, 2001	Haleakala	NEAT	HYG	7.5 km	MPC · JPL
42151	2001 BD_{54}	—	January 18, 2001	Kitt Peak	Spacewatch	·	9.0 km	MPC · JPL
42152	2001 BX_{57}	—	January 21, 2001	Socorro	LINEAR	KOR	3.2 km	MPC · JPL
42153	2001 BG_{58}	—	January 21, 2001	Socorro	LINEAR	·	5.7 km	MPC · JPL
42154	2001 BP_{62}	—	January 29, 2001	Socorro	LINEAR	·	8.1 km	MPC · JPL
42155	2001 BA_{63}	—	January 29, 2001	Socorro	LINEAR	ERI · slow	5.7 km	MPC · JPL
42156	2001 BV_{63}	—	January 29, 2001	Socorro	LINEAR	(5)	3.3 km	MPC · JPL
42157	2001 BX_{66}	—	January 29, 2001	Socorro	LINEAR	·	3.9 km	MPC · JPL
42158	2001 BT_{70}	—	January 29, 2001	Socorro	LINEAR	MRX	3.1 km	MPC · JPL
42159	2001 BT_{72}	—	January 27, 2001	Haleakala	NEAT	·	10 km	MPC · JPL
42160	2001 BH_{73}	—	January 28, 2001	Haleakala	NEAT	·	6.6 km	MPC · JPL
42161	2001 BJ_{74}	—	January 31, 2001	Socorro	LINEAR	THM	5.8 km	MPC · JPL
42162	2001 BA_{76}	—	January 26, 2001	Socorro	LINEAR	·	4.2 km	MPC · JPL
42163	2001 BC_{77}	—	January 26, 2001	Socorro	LINEAR	·	3.3 km	MPC · JPL
42164	2001 CT	—	February 1, 2001	Socorro	LINEAR	·	6.3 km	MPC · JPL
42165	2001 CQ_{10}	—	February 1, 2001	Socorro	LINEAR	EUN	2.2 km	MPC · JPL
42166	2001 CL_{11}	—	February 1, 2001	Socorro	LINEAR	MAS	2.0 km	MPC · JPL
42167	2001 CR_{13}	—	February 1, 2001	Socorro	LINEAR	3:2	12 km	MPC · JPL
42168 Enispe	2001 CT_{13}	Enispe	February 1, 2001	Socorro	LINEAR	L4	19 km	MPC · JPL
42169	2001 CV_{13}	—	February 1, 2001	Socorro	LINEAR	·	4.3 km	MPC · JPL
42170	2001 CA_{16}	—	February 1, 2001	Socorro	LINEAR	EUN	3.2 km	MPC · JPL
42171	2001 CP_{17}	—	February 1, 2001	Socorro	LINEAR	·	3.5 km	MPC · JPL
42172	2001 CR_{17}	—	February 1, 2001	Socorro	LINEAR	CYB	7.7 km	MPC · JPL
42173	2001 CQ_{18}	—	February 2, 2001	Socorro	LINEAR	PHO	2.8 km	MPC · JPL
42174	2001 CJ_{21}	—	February 1, 2001	Anderson Mesa	LONEOS	·	3.1 km	MPC · JPL
42175 Yuyang	2001 CR_{21}	Yuyang	February 1, 2001	Anderson Mesa	LONEOS	HYG	5.2 km	MPC · JPL
42176	2001 CK_{22}	—	February 1, 2001	Anderson Mesa	LONEOS	L4	20 km	MPC · JPL
42177 Bolin	2001 CL_{22}	Bolin	February 1, 2001	Anderson Mesa	LONEOS	·	3.4 km	MPC · JPL
42178	2001 CO_{25}	—	February 1, 2001	Socorro	LINEAR	·	5.6 km	MPC · JPL
42179	2001 CP_{25}	—	February 1, 2001	Socorro	LINEAR	L4	15 km	MPC · JPL
42180	2001 CL_{26}	—	February 1, 2001	Socorro	LINEAR	·	12 km	MPC · JPL
42181	2001 CY_{27}	—	February 2, 2001	Anderson Mesa	LONEOS	·	2.2 km	MPC · JPL
42182	2001 CP_{29}	—	February 2, 2001	Anderson Mesa	LONEOS	L4	18 km	MPC · JPL
42183 Tubiana	2001 CY_{29}	Tubiana	February 2, 2001	Anderson Mesa	LONEOS	·	6.0 km	MPC · JPL
42184	2001 CP_{30}	—	February 2, 2001	Haleakala	NEAT	EOS	6.6 km	MPC · JPL
42185	2001 CS_{30}	—	February 2, 2001	Haleakala	NEAT	EOS	5.8 km	MPC · JPL
42186	2001 CH_{32}	—	February 11, 2001	Črni Vrh	Matičič, S.	·	10 km	MPC · JPL
42187	2001 CS_{32}	—	February 13, 2001	Socorro	LINEAR	L4	38 km	MPC · JPL
42188	2001 CZ_{32}	—	February 13, 2001	Socorro	LINEAR	WAT	5.6 km	MPC · JPL
42189	2001 CJ_{33}	—	February 13, 2001	Socorro	LINEAR	·	10 km	MPC · JPL
42190	2001 CM_{36}	—	February 15, 2001	Oizumi	T. Kobayashi	HIL · 3:2	12 km	MPC · JPL
42191 Thurmann	2001 CJ_{37}	Thurmann	February 14, 2001	Vicques	M. Ory	·	3.3 km	MPC · JPL
42192	2001 CJ_{39}	—	February 13, 2001	Socorro	LINEAR	·	3.4 km	MPC · JPL
42193	2001 CV_{43}	—	February 15, 2001	Socorro	LINEAR	·	10 km	MPC · JPL
42194	2001 DP_{10}	—	February 17, 2001	Socorro	LINEAR	·	11 km	MPC · JPL
42195	2001 DO_{17}	—	February 16, 2001	Socorro	LINEAR	slow	11 km	MPC · JPL
42196	2001 DE_{21}	—	February 16, 2001	Socorro	LINEAR	EOS	7.1 km	MPC · JPL
42197	2001 DM_{23}	—	February 17, 2001	Socorro	LINEAR	·	7.0 km	MPC · JPL
42198	2001 DP_{23}	—	February 17, 2001	Socorro	LINEAR	EOS	4.3 km	MPC · JPL
42199	2001 DT_{23}	—	February 17, 2001	Socorro	LINEAR	·	6.9 km	MPC · JPL
42200	2001 DJ_{26}	—	February 17, 2001	Socorro	LINEAR	L4	16 km	MPC · JPL

== 42201–42300 ==
back to top

Designation			Discovery			Properties		Ref
Permanent	Provisional	Named after	Date	Site	Discoverer(s)	Category	Diam.	Ref
42201	2001 DH_{29}	—	February 17, 2001	Socorro	LINEAR	L4	20 km	MPC · JPL
42202	2001 DC_{31}	—	February 17, 2001	Socorro	LINEAR	·	7.0 km	MPC · JPL
42203	2001 DB_{35}	—	February 19, 2001	Socorro	LINEAR	·	5.7 km	MPC · JPL
42204	2001 DW_{35}	—	February 19, 2001	Socorro	LINEAR	·	6.1 km	MPC · JPL
42205	2001 DT_{38}	—	February 19, 2001	Socorro	LINEAR	WIT	3.1 km	MPC · JPL
42206	2001 DJ_{41}	—	February 19, 2001	Socorro	LINEAR	·	8.0 km	MPC · JPL
42207	2001 DL_{46}	—	February 19, 2001	Socorro	LINEAR	KOR	3.1 km	MPC · JPL
42208	2001 DQ_{47}	—	February 19, 2001	Haleakala	NEAT	·	12 km	MPC · JPL
42209	2001 DF_{48}	—	February 16, 2001	Socorro	LINEAR	EOS	5.6 km	MPC · JPL
42210	2001 DL_{49}	—	February 16, 2001	Socorro	LINEAR	EOS	5.8 km	MPC · JPL
42211	2001 DO_{49}	—	February 16, 2001	Socorro	LINEAR	EOS	5.7 km	MPC · JPL
42212	2001 DO_{51}	—	February 16, 2001	Socorro	LINEAR	EOS	5.9 km	MPC · JPL
42213	2001 DU_{51}	—	February 16, 2001	Socorro	LINEAR	·	4.0 km	MPC · JPL
42214	2001 DA_{52}	—	February 16, 2001	Socorro	LINEAR	·	9.7 km	MPC · JPL
42215	2001 DO_{52}	—	February 17, 2001	Socorro	LINEAR	·	7.8 km	MPC · JPL
42216	2001 DX_{52}	—	February 17, 2001	Socorro	LINEAR	(5)	3.3 km	MPC · JPL
42217	2001 DK_{53}	—	February 19, 2001	Socorro	LINEAR	·	4.1 km	MPC · JPL
42218	2001 DN_{59}	—	February 17, 2001	Socorro	LINEAR	VER	7.1 km	MPC · JPL
42219	2001 DY_{59}	—	February 19, 2001	Socorro	LINEAR	(5)	3.2 km	MPC · JPL
42220	2001 DC_{60}	—	February 19, 2001	Socorro	LINEAR	·	5.4 km	MPC · JPL
42221	2001 DA_{62}	—	February 19, 2001	Socorro	LINEAR	·	4.2 km	MPC · JPL
42222	2001 DT_{62}	—	February 19, 2001	Socorro	LINEAR	·	6.6 km	MPC · JPL
42223	2001 DC_{63}	—	February 19, 2001	Socorro	LINEAR	·	5.2 km	MPC · JPL
42224	2001 DT_{65}	—	February 19, 2001	Socorro	LINEAR	·	7.9 km	MPC · JPL
42225	2001 DV_{72}	—	February 19, 2001	Socorro	LINEAR	VER	6.9 km	MPC · JPL
42226	2001 DO_{81}	—	February 26, 2001	Oizumi	T. Kobayashi	EOS	5.4 km	MPC · JPL
42227	2001 DS_{93}	—	February 19, 2001	Socorro	LINEAR	EOS	4.7 km	MPC · JPL
42228	2001 DO_{95}	—	February 18, 2001	Haleakala	NEAT	·	9.2 km	MPC · JPL
42229	2001 DC_{99}	—	February 17, 2001	Socorro	LINEAR	·	10 km	MPC · JPL
42230	2001 DE_{108}	—	February 19, 2001	Anderson Mesa	LONEOS	L4	13 km	MPC · JPL
42231	2001 EM_{1}	—	March 1, 2001	Socorro	LINEAR	·	6.3 km	MPC · JPL
42232	2001 EH_{2}	—	March 1, 2001	Socorro	LINEAR	EOS	10 km	MPC · JPL
42233	2001 EL_{2}	—	March 1, 2001	Socorro	LINEAR	EOS	5.0 km	MPC · JPL
42234	2001 EP_{2}	—	March 1, 2001	Socorro	LINEAR	·	7.4 km	MPC · JPL
42235	2001 EM_{10}	—	March 2, 2001	Anderson Mesa	LONEOS	·	3.5 km	MPC · JPL
42236	2001 EP_{19}	—	March 15, 2001	Anderson Mesa	LONEOS	·	7.2 km	MPC · JPL
42237	2001 EG_{21}	—	March 15, 2001	Anderson Mesa	LONEOS	HIL · 3:2	18 km	MPC · JPL
42238	2001 FF_{4}	—	March 19, 2001	Oizumi	T. Kobayashi	·	3.1 km	MPC · JPL
42239	2001 FB_{20}	—	March 19, 2001	Anderson Mesa	LONEOS	·	8.2 km	MPC · JPL
42240	2001 FX_{34}	—	March 18, 2001	Socorro	LINEAR	HYG	9.0 km	MPC · JPL
42241	2001 FF_{45}	—	March 18, 2001	Socorro	LINEAR	EUN	2.5 km	MPC · JPL
42242	2001 FU_{61}	—	March 19, 2001	Socorro	LINEAR	·	8.0 km	MPC · JPL
42243	2001 FB_{65}	—	March 19, 2001	Socorro	LINEAR	·	8.6 km	MPC · JPL
42244	2001 FH_{65}	—	March 19, 2001	Socorro	LINEAR	(16286)	3.2 km	MPC · JPL
42245	2001 FB_{88}	—	March 21, 2001	Anderson Mesa	LONEOS	fast	7.6 km	MPC · JPL
42246 Bobanderson	2001 FX_{121}	Bobanderson	March 29, 2001	Desert Beaver	W. K. Y. Yeung	·	3.1 km	MPC · JPL
42247	2001 FU_{156}	—	March 26, 2001	Haleakala	NEAT	·	5.6 km	MPC · JPL
42248	2001 FU_{186}	—	March 18, 2001	Anderson Mesa	LONEOS	(5)	4.7 km	MPC · JPL
42249	2001 HZ_{27}	—	April 27, 2001	Socorro	LINEAR	·	3.3 km	MPC · JPL
42250	2001 KS_{12}	—	May 18, 2001	Socorro	LINEAR	·	14 km	MPC · JPL
42251	2001 LA	—	June 1, 2001	Socorro	LINEAR	PHO	3.2 km	MPC · JPL
42252	2001 LU_{2}	—	June 13, 2001	Socorro	LINEAR	MAR	4.3 km	MPC · JPL
42253	2001 NQ_{12}	—	July 13, 2001	Haleakala	NEAT	·	2.0 km	MPC · JPL
42254	2001 NX_{21}	—	July 14, 2001	Palomar	NEAT	NYS ·	2.1 km	MPC · JPL
42255	2001 OT_{22}	—	July 18, 2001	Palomar	NEAT	·	1.8 km	MPC · JPL
42256	2001 OA_{63}	—	July 20, 2001	Anderson Mesa	LONEOS	·	2.9 km	MPC · JPL
42257	2001 OU_{68}	—	July 16, 2001	Haleakala	NEAT	·	3.3 km	MPC · JPL
42258	2001 OZ_{68}	—	July 17, 2001	Haleakala	NEAT	NYS	5.0 km	MPC · JPL
42259	2001 OD_{81}	—	July 29, 2001	Socorro	LINEAR	EOS	9.9 km	MPC · JPL
42260	2001 OX_{82}	—	July 27, 2001	Palomar	NEAT	MAR	4.8 km	MPC · JPL
42261	2001 OC_{92}	—	July 22, 2001	Palomar	NEAT	·	3.7 km	MPC · JPL
42262	2001 PE_{6}	—	August 10, 2001	Haleakala	NEAT	GEF	4.2 km	MPC · JPL
42263	2001 PA_{42}	—	August 11, 2001	Palomar	NEAT	GEF	4.7 km	MPC · JPL
42264	2001 QZ_{30}	—	August 16, 2001	Socorro	LINEAR	MAR	5.9 km	MPC · JPL
42265	2001 QL_{69}	—	August 17, 2001	Socorro	LINEAR	EOS	6.7 km	MPC · JPL
42266	2001 QZ_{77}	—	August 16, 2001	Socorro	LINEAR	·	2.9 km	MPC · JPL
42267	2001 QJ_{81}	—	August 17, 2001	Socorro	LINEAR	·	5.4 km	MPC · JPL
42268	2001 QO_{91}	—	August 16, 2001	Socorro	LINEAR	·	6.2 km	MPC · JPL
42269	2001 QB_{117}	—	August 17, 2001	Socorro	LINEAR	·	5.6 km	MPC · JPL
42270	2001 QA_{139}	—	August 22, 2001	Socorro	LINEAR	·	7.0 km	MPC · JPL
42271 Keikokubota	2001 QL_{154}	Keikokubota	August 24, 2001	Goodricke-Pigott	R. A. Tucker	·	4.2 km	MPC · JPL
42272	2001 QH_{179}	—	August 28, 2001	Palomar	NEAT	·	4.6 km	MPC · JPL
42273	2001 QO_{245}	—	August 24, 2001	Anderson Mesa	LONEOS	·	14 km	MPC · JPL
42274	2001 QM_{264}	—	August 25, 2001	Socorro	LINEAR	·	2.1 km	MPC · JPL
42275	2001 RG_{17}	—	September 11, 2001	Desert Eagle	W. K. Y. Yeung	·	1.1 km	MPC · JPL
42276	2001 SV_{35}	—	September 16, 2001	Socorro	LINEAR	EOS	4.4 km	MPC · JPL
42277	2001 SQ_{51}	—	September 16, 2001	Socorro	LINEAR	L5	20 km	MPC · JPL
42278	2001 SH_{265}	—	September 25, 2001	Desert Eagle	W. K. Y. Yeung	EOS	5.2 km	MPC · JPL
42279	2001 SP_{267}	—	September 25, 2001	Desert Eagle	W. K. Y. Yeung	·	4.7 km	MPC · JPL
42280	2001 SS_{267}	—	September 25, 2001	Desert Eagle	W. K. Y. Yeung	·	3.1 km	MPC · JPL
42281	2001 SW_{267}	—	September 25, 2001	Desert Eagle	W. K. Y. Yeung	·	3.8 km	MPC · JPL
42282	2001 SB_{283}	—	September 22, 2001	Socorro	LINEAR	EUN · slow	4.1 km	MPC · JPL
42283	2001 SQ_{316}	—	September 25, 2001	Socorro	LINEAR	EUN	4.8 km	MPC · JPL
42284	2001 TV_{8}	—	October 9, 2001	Socorro	LINEAR	EUN	7.4 km	MPC · JPL
42285	2001 TN_{40}	—	October 14, 2001	Socorro	LINEAR	·	2.4 km	MPC · JPL
42286	2001 TN_{41}	—	October 14, 2001	Socorro	LINEAR	APO +1km	1.6 km	MPC · JPL
42287	2001 TE_{51}	—	October 13, 2001	Socorro	LINEAR	·	3.7 km	MPC · JPL
42288	2001 TC_{65}	—	October 13, 2001	Socorro	LINEAR	·	2.9 km	MPC · JPL
42289	2001 TY_{105}	—	October 13, 2001	Socorro	LINEAR	·	4.0 km	MPC · JPL
42290	2001 TU_{114}	—	October 14, 2001	Socorro	LINEAR	PAD	7.4 km	MPC · JPL
42291	2001 TD_{121}	—	October 15, 2001	Socorro	LINEAR	·	9.1 km	MPC · JPL
42292	2001 TN_{150}	—	October 10, 2001	Palomar	NEAT	ANF	3.4 km	MPC · JPL
42293	2001 UZ_{3}	—	October 17, 2001	Desert Eagle	W. K. Y. Yeung	·	2.8 km	MPC · JPL
42294	2001 UP_{5}	—	October 21, 2001	Desert Eagle	W. K. Y. Yeung	·	2.0 km	MPC · JPL
42295 Teresateng	2001 UG_{17}	Teresateng	October 23, 2001	Desert Eagle	W. K. Y. Yeung	·	2.6 km	MPC · JPL
42296	2001 UJ_{31}	—	October 16, 2001	Socorro	LINEAR	·	4.3 km	MPC · JPL
42297	2001 UL_{73}	—	October 17, 2001	Socorro	LINEAR	·	6.5 km	MPC · JPL
42298	2001 UP_{123}	—	October 22, 2001	Palomar	NEAT	PHO	2.6 km	MPC · JPL
42299	2001 UQ_{136}	—	October 22, 2001	Socorro	LINEAR	·	6.8 km	MPC · JPL
42300	2001 UU_{140}	—	October 23, 2001	Socorro	LINEAR	·	5.4 km	MPC · JPL

== 42301–42400 ==
back to top

Designation			Discovery			Properties		Ref
Permanent	Provisional	Named after	Date	Site	Discoverer(s)	Category	Diam.	Ref
42301	2001 UR_{163}	—	October 21, 2001	Kitt Peak	Deep Ecliptic Survey	res · 4:9	367 km	MPC · JPL
42302	2001 VF_{10}	—	November 10, 2001	Socorro	LINEAR	(194)	4.8 km	MPC · JPL
42303	2001 VO_{18}	—	November 9, 2001	Socorro	LINEAR	·	1.8 km	MPC · JPL
42304	2001 VZ_{34}	—	November 9, 2001	Socorro	LINEAR	·	7.6 km	MPC · JPL
42305	2001 VU_{44}	—	November 9, 2001	Socorro	LINEAR	NYS	3.8 km	MPC · JPL
42306	2001 VU_{46}	—	November 9, 2001	Socorro	LINEAR	·	5.2 km	MPC · JPL
42307	2001 VC_{48}	—	November 9, 2001	Socorro	LINEAR	NYS	4.6 km	MPC · JPL
42308	2001 VM_{50}	—	November 10, 2001	Socorro	LINEAR	·	6.9 km	MPC · JPL
42309	2001 VO_{86}	—	November 12, 2001	Socorro	LINEAR	NYS	3.0 km	MPC · JPL
42310	2001 VB_{88}	—	November 12, 2001	Haleakala	NEAT	·	4.9 km	MPC · JPL
42311	2001 VB_{93}	—	November 15, 2001	Socorro	LINEAR	·	3.1 km	MPC · JPL
42312	2001 VY_{93}	—	November 15, 2001	Socorro	LINEAR	·	3.7 km	MPC · JPL
42313	2001 VH_{97}	—	November 15, 2001	Socorro	LINEAR	ULA · CYB	11 km	MPC · JPL
42314	2001 VQ_{121}	—	November 15, 2001	Palomar	NEAT	TEL	4.5 km	MPC · JPL
42315	2001 VW_{121}	—	November 13, 2001	Haleakala	NEAT	EOS	5.5 km	MPC · JPL
42316	2001 WT_{37}	—	November 17, 2001	Socorro	LINEAR	·	1.7 km	MPC · JPL
42317	2001 WW_{39}	—	November 17, 2001	Socorro	LINEAR	·	1.6 km	MPC · JPL
42318	2001 XV_{1}	—	December 6, 2001	Socorro	LINEAR	T_{j} (2.98)	11 km	MPC · JPL
42319	2001 XU_{15}	—	December 10, 2001	Socorro	LINEAR	NYS	1.8 km	MPC · JPL
42320	2001 XH_{17}	—	December 9, 2001	Socorro	LINEAR	·	6.4 km	MPC · JPL
42321	2001 XE_{24}	—	December 10, 2001	Socorro	LINEAR	·	3.7 km	MPC · JPL
42322	2001 XS_{49}	—	December 10, 2001	Socorro	LINEAR	·	2.3 km	MPC · JPL
42323	2001 XQ_{55}	—	December 10, 2001	Socorro	LINEAR	THM	4.3 km	MPC · JPL
42324	2001 XX_{62}	—	December 10, 2001	Socorro	LINEAR	·	3.3 km	MPC · JPL
42325	2001 XB_{89}	—	December 10, 2001	Socorro	LINEAR	·	1.9 km	MPC · JPL
42326	2001 XW_{104}	—	December 14, 2001	Kitt Peak	Spacewatch	·	1.8 km	MPC · JPL
42327	2001 XQ_{108}	—	December 10, 2001	Socorro	LINEAR	·	5.7 km	MPC · JPL
42328	2001 XM_{133}	—	December 14, 2001	Socorro	LINEAR	·	4.1 km	MPC · JPL
42329	2001 XL_{169}	—	December 14, 2001	Socorro	LINEAR	·	3.5 km	MPC · JPL
42330	2001 XC_{194}	—	December 14, 2001	Socorro	LINEAR	NYS	2.8 km	MPC · JPL
42331	2001 XJ_{195}	—	December 14, 2001	Socorro	LINEAR	·	2.2 km	MPC · JPL
42332	2001 XP_{211}	—	December 11, 2001	Socorro	LINEAR	·	2.0 km	MPC · JPL
42333	2001 XM_{214}	—	December 11, 2001	Socorro	LINEAR	DOR	9.6 km	MPC · JPL
42334	2001 XG_{222}	—	December 15, 2001	Socorro	LINEAR	·	1.4 km	MPC · JPL
42335	2001 XX_{232}	—	December 15, 2001	Socorro	LINEAR	·	1.8 km	MPC · JPL
42336	2001 XP_{247}	—	December 15, 2001	Socorro	LINEAR	AGN	3.0 km	MPC · JPL
42337	2001 YK_{16}	—	December 17, 2001	Socorro	LINEAR	·	2.9 km	MPC · JPL
42338	2001 YT_{80}	—	December 18, 2001	Socorro	LINEAR	·	3.2 km	MPC · JPL
42339	2002 AX_{16}	—	January 5, 2002	Haleakala	NEAT	·	5.7 km	MPC · JPL
42340	2002 AH_{23}	—	January 5, 2002	Haleakala	NEAT	·	4.5 km	MPC · JPL
42341	2002 AK_{34}	—	January 12, 2002	Kitt Peak	Spacewatch	·	2.4 km	MPC · JPL
42342	2002 AU_{58}	—	January 9, 2002	Socorro	LINEAR	·	3.6 km	MPC · JPL
42343	2002 AB_{63}	—	January 11, 2002	Socorro	LINEAR	·	4.0 km	MPC · JPL
42344	2002 AT_{90}	—	January 12, 2002	Socorro	LINEAR	PHO	2.9 km	MPC · JPL
42345	2002 AN_{118}	—	January 9, 2002	Socorro	LINEAR	·	2.2 km	MPC · JPL
42346	2002 AV_{131}	—	January 8, 2002	Socorro	LINEAR	V	2.5 km	MPC · JPL
42347	2002 AV_{155}	—	January 14, 2002	Socorro	LINEAR	·	5.8 km	MPC · JPL
42348	2002 BV_{9}	—	January 18, 2002	Socorro	LINEAR	·	12 km	MPC · JPL
42349	2002 BH_{17}	—	January 20, 2002	Kitt Peak	Spacewatch	CYB	6.6 km	MPC · JPL
42350	2002 BN_{19}	—	January 21, 2002	Palomar	NEAT	PHO	3.0 km	MPC · JPL
42351	2002 CB_{6}	—	February 4, 2002	Haleakala	NEAT	·	2.5 km	MPC · JPL
42352	2002 CV_{32}	—	February 6, 2002	Socorro	LINEAR	GEF	3.4 km	MPC · JPL
42353	2002 CZ_{41}	—	February 7, 2002	Haleakala	NEAT	EUN	2.8 km	MPC · JPL
42354 Kindleberger	2002 CK_{43}	Kindleberger	February 12, 2002	Fountain Hills	C. W. Juels, P. R. Holvorcem	·	2.9 km	MPC · JPL
42355 Typhon	2002 CR_{46}	Typhon	February 5, 2002	Palomar	NEAT	centaur · moon	192 km	MPC · JPL
42356	2002 CA_{47}	—	February 2, 2002	Haleakala	NEAT	·	2.2 km	MPC · JPL
42357	2002 CS_{52}	—	February 12, 2002	Fountain Hills	C. W. Juels	·	2.4 km	MPC · JPL
42358	2002 CO_{55}	—	February 7, 2002	Socorro	LINEAR	·	3.7 km	MPC · JPL
42359	2002 CY_{63}	—	February 6, 2002	Socorro	LINEAR	EOS	5.4 km	MPC · JPL
42360	2002 CG_{99}	—	February 7, 2002	Socorro	LINEAR	KOR	3.6 km	MPC · JPL
42361	2002 CS_{101}	—	February 7, 2002	Socorro	LINEAR	·	1.8 km	MPC · JPL
42362	2002 CY_{102}	—	February 7, 2002	Socorro	LINEAR	·	3.1 km	MPC · JPL
42363	2002 CL_{103}	—	February 7, 2002	Socorro	LINEAR	·	2.8 km	MPC · JPL
42364	2002 CS_{107}	—	February 7, 2002	Socorro	LINEAR	·	2.0 km	MPC · JPL
42365 Caligiuri	2002 CM_{115}	Caligiuri	February 12, 2002	Fountain Hills	C. W. Juels, P. R. Holvorcem	·	4.5 km	MPC · JPL
42366	2002 CL_{125}	—	February 7, 2002	Socorro	LINEAR	·	2.7 km	MPC · JPL
42367	2002 CQ_{134}	—	February 7, 2002	Socorro	LINEAR	L4	32 km	MPC · JPL
42368	2002 CC_{135}	—	February 8, 2002	Socorro	LINEAR	URS	10 km	MPC · JPL
42369	2002 CT_{135}	—	February 8, 2002	Socorro	LINEAR	·	10 km	MPC · JPL
42370	2002 CB_{137}	—	February 8, 2002	Socorro	LINEAR	ADE	5.7 km	MPC · JPL
42371	2002 CT_{141}	—	February 8, 2002	Socorro	LINEAR	TEL	4.1 km	MPC · JPL
42372	2002 CD_{146}	—	February 9, 2002	Socorro	LINEAR	·	4.9 km	MPC · JPL
42373	2002 CM_{174}	—	February 8, 2002	Socorro	LINEAR	·	2.4 km	MPC · JPL
42374	2002 CB_{175}	—	February 8, 2002	Socorro	LINEAR	EUN	5.3 km	MPC · JPL
42375	2002 CA_{233}	—	February 11, 2002	Socorro	LINEAR	·	4.3 km	MPC · JPL
42376	2002 DQ_{2}	—	February 19, 2002	Socorro	LINEAR	PHO	3.2 km	MPC · JPL
42377 KLENOT	2002 EU_{2}	KLENOT	March 8, 2002	Kleť	KLENOT	·	3.2 km	MPC · JPL
42378	2002 EL_{12}	—	March 14, 2002	Desert Eagle	W. K. Y. Yeung	·	1.6 km	MPC · JPL
42379	2013 P-L	—	September 24, 1960	Palomar	C. J. van Houten, I. van Houten-Groeneveld, T. Gehrels	·	2.2 km	MPC · JPL
42380	2065 P-L	—	September 24, 1960	Palomar	C. J. van Houten, I. van Houten-Groeneveld, T. Gehrels	HYG	6.4 km	MPC · JPL
42381	2090 P-L	—	September 24, 1960	Palomar	C. J. van Houten, I. van Houten-Groeneveld, T. Gehrels	·	4.8 km	MPC · JPL
42382	2183 P-L	—	September 24, 1960	Palomar	C. J. van Houten, I. van Houten-Groeneveld, T. Gehrels	fast	2.2 km	MPC · JPL
42383	2231 P-L	—	September 24, 1960	Palomar	C. J. van Houten, I. van Houten-Groeneveld, T. Gehrels	·	3.7 km	MPC · JPL
42384	2506 P-L	—	September 24, 1960	Palomar	C. J. van Houten, I. van Houten-Groeneveld, T. Gehrels	·	4.8 km	MPC · JPL
42385	2844 P-L	—	September 24, 1960	Palomar	C. J. van Houten, I. van Houten-Groeneveld, T. Gehrels	KOR	2.5 km	MPC · JPL
42386	3552 P-L	—	October 22, 1960	Palomar	C. J. van Houten, I. van Houten-Groeneveld, T. Gehrels	·	8.2 km	MPC · JPL
42387	4071 P-L	—	September 24, 1960	Palomar	C. J. van Houten, I. van Houten-Groeneveld, T. Gehrels	·	2.7 km	MPC · JPL
42388	4111 P-L	—	September 24, 1960	Palomar	C. J. van Houten, I. van Houten-Groeneveld, T. Gehrels	·	4.5 km	MPC · JPL
42389	4251 P-L	—	September 24, 1960	Palomar	C. J. van Houten, I. van Houten-Groeneveld, T. Gehrels	·	2.6 km	MPC · JPL
42390	4305 P-L	—	September 24, 1960	Palomar	C. J. van Houten, I. van Houten-Groeneveld, T. Gehrels	·	6.4 km	MPC · JPL
42391	4753 P-L	—	September 24, 1960	Palomar	C. J. van Houten, I. van Houten-Groeneveld, T. Gehrels	·	1.5 km	MPC · JPL
42392	4908 P-L	—	September 24, 1960	Palomar	C. J. van Houten, I. van Houten-Groeneveld, T. Gehrels	·	3.7 km	MPC · JPL
42393	6012 P-L	—	September 24, 1960	Palomar	C. J. van Houten, I. van Houten-Groeneveld, T. Gehrels	·	5.9 km	MPC · JPL
42394	6111 P-L	—	September 24, 1960	Palomar	C. J. van Houten, I. van Houten-Groeneveld, T. Gehrels	EOS	5.0 km	MPC · JPL
42395	6193 P-L	—	September 24, 1960	Palomar	C. J. van Houten, I. van Houten-Groeneveld, T. Gehrels	·	4.5 km	MPC · JPL
42396	6213 P-L	—	September 24, 1960	Palomar	C. J. van Houten, I. van Houten-Groeneveld, T. Gehrels	·	2.3 km	MPC · JPL
42397	6326 P-L	—	September 24, 1960	Palomar	C. J. van Houten, I. van Houten-Groeneveld, T. Gehrels	·	4.5 km	MPC · JPL
42398	6370 P-L	—	September 24, 1960	Palomar	C. J. van Houten, I. van Houten-Groeneveld, T. Gehrels	EUN	2.2 km	MPC · JPL
42399	6372 P-L	—	September 24, 1960	Palomar	C. J. van Houten, I. van Houten-Groeneveld, T. Gehrels	·	2.9 km	MPC · JPL
42400	6587 P-L	—	September 24, 1960	Palomar	C. J. van Houten, I. van Houten-Groeneveld, T. Gehrels	THM	5.1 km	MPC · JPL

== 42401–42500 ==
back to top

Designation			Discovery			Properties		Ref
Permanent	Provisional	Named after	Date	Site	Discoverer(s)	Category	Diam.	Ref
42401	6589 P-L	—	September 24, 1960	Palomar	C. J. van Houten, I. van Houten-Groeneveld, T. Gehrels	·	8.4 km	MPC · JPL
42402	6619 P-L	—	September 24, 1960	Palomar	C. J. van Houten, I. van Houten-Groeneveld, T. Gehrels	·	2.0 km	MPC · JPL
42403 Andraimon	6844 P-L	Andraimon	September 24, 1960	Palomar	C. J. van Houten, I. van Houten-Groeneveld, T. Gehrels	L4	20 km	MPC · JPL
42404	7606 P-L	—	October 17, 1960	Palomar	C. J. van Houten, I. van Houten-Groeneveld, T. Gehrels	·	1.9 km	MPC · JPL
42405	9085 P-L	—	September 27, 1960	Palomar	C. J. van Houten, I. van Houten-Groeneveld, T. Gehrels	·	1.6 km	MPC · JPL
42406	9104 P-L	—	September 24, 1960	Palomar	C. J. van Houten, I. van Houten-Groeneveld, T. Gehrels	·	5.9 km	MPC · JPL
42407	9509 P-L	—	October 22, 1960	Palomar	C. J. van Houten, I. van Houten-Groeneveld, T. Gehrels	·	3.7 km	MPC · JPL
42408	9555 P-L	—	October 17, 1960	Palomar	C. J. van Houten, I. van Houten-Groeneveld, T. Gehrels	·	7.1 km	MPC · JPL
42409	1108 T-1	—	March 25, 1971	Palomar	C. J. van Houten, I. van Houten-Groeneveld, T. Gehrels	·	1.8 km	MPC · JPL
42410	3062 T-1	—	March 26, 1971	Palomar	C. J. van Houten, I. van Houten-Groeneveld, T. Gehrels	·	3.3 km	MPC · JPL
42411	3249 T-1	—	March 26, 1971	Palomar	C. J. van Houten, I. van Houten-Groeneveld, T. Gehrels	SUL	8.2 km	MPC · JPL
42412	4320 T-1	—	March 26, 1971	Palomar	C. J. van Houten, I. van Houten-Groeneveld, T. Gehrels	·	4.8 km	MPC · JPL
42413	1072 T-2	—	September 29, 1973	Palomar	C. J. van Houten, I. van Houten-Groeneveld, T. Gehrels	·	1.7 km	MPC · JPL
42414	1130 T-2	—	September 29, 1973	Palomar	C. J. van Houten, I. van Houten-Groeneveld, T. Gehrels	·	3.4 km	MPC · JPL
42415	1175 T-2	—	September 29, 1973	Palomar	C. J. van Houten, I. van Houten-Groeneveld, T. Gehrels	MAS	2.6 km	MPC · JPL
42416	1195 T-2	—	September 29, 1973	Palomar	C. J. van Houten, I. van Houten-Groeneveld, T. Gehrels	·	5.8 km	MPC · JPL
42417	1613 T-2	—	September 24, 1973	Palomar	C. J. van Houten, I. van Houten-Groeneveld, T. Gehrels	·	3.1 km	MPC · JPL
42418	2081 T-2	—	September 29, 1973	Palomar	C. J. van Houten, I. van Houten-Groeneveld, T. Gehrels	·	3.0 km	MPC · JPL
42419	2187 T-2	—	September 29, 1973	Palomar	C. J. van Houten, I. van Houten-Groeneveld, T. Gehrels	·	3.2 km	MPC · JPL
42420	2290 T-2	—	September 29, 1973	Palomar	C. J. van Houten, I. van Houten-Groeneveld, T. Gehrels	NYS	2.7 km	MPC · JPL
42421	2306 T-2	—	September 29, 1973	Palomar	C. J. van Houten, I. van Houten-Groeneveld, T. Gehrels	MAS	2.7 km	MPC · JPL
42422	3048 T-2	—	September 30, 1973	Palomar	C. J. van Houten, I. van Houten-Groeneveld, T. Gehrels	·	5.3 km	MPC · JPL
42423	3085 T-2	—	September 30, 1973	Palomar	C. J. van Houten, I. van Houten-Groeneveld, T. Gehrels	EOS	3.8 km	MPC · JPL
42424	3120 T-2	—	September 30, 1973	Palomar	C. J. van Houten, I. van Houten-Groeneveld, T. Gehrels	·	3.8 km	MPC · JPL
42425	3227 T-2	—	September 30, 1973	Palomar	C. J. van Houten, I. van Houten-Groeneveld, T. Gehrels	WIT	2.9 km	MPC · JPL
42426	4634 T-2	—	September 30, 1973	Palomar	C. J. van Houten, I. van Houten-Groeneveld, T. Gehrels	·	2.6 km	MPC · JPL
42427	5061 T-2	—	September 25, 1973	Palomar	C. J. van Houten, I. van Houten-Groeneveld, T. Gehrels	·	3.2 km	MPC · JPL
42428	5089 T-2	—	September 25, 1973	Palomar	C. J. van Houten, I. van Houten-Groeneveld, T. Gehrels	·	1.5 km	MPC · JPL
42429	5132 T-2	—	September 25, 1973	Palomar	C. J. van Houten, I. van Houten-Groeneveld, T. Gehrels	·	3.5 km	MPC · JPL
42430	5158 T-2	—	September 25, 1973	Palomar	C. J. van Houten, I. van Houten-Groeneveld, T. Gehrels	·	4.5 km	MPC · JPL
42431	1051 T-3	—	October 17, 1977	Palomar	C. J. van Houten, I. van Houten-Groeneveld, T. Gehrels	PHO	5.6 km	MPC · JPL
42432	1134 T-3	—	October 17, 1977	Palomar	C. J. van Houten, I. van Houten-Groeneveld, T. Gehrels	·	2.4 km	MPC · JPL
42433	1887 T-3	—	October 17, 1977	Palomar	C. J. van Houten, I. van Houten-Groeneveld, T. Gehrels	EOS	4.6 km	MPC · JPL
42434	2121 T-3	—	October 16, 1977	Palomar	C. J. van Houten, I. van Houten-Groeneveld, T. Gehrels	·	9.0 km	MPC · JPL
42435	2164 T-3	—	October 16, 1977	Palomar	C. J. van Houten, I. van Houten-Groeneveld, T. Gehrels	·	6.0 km	MPC · JPL
42436	2204 T-3	—	October 16, 1977	Palomar	C. J. van Houten, I. van Houten-Groeneveld, T. Gehrels	·	3.1 km	MPC · JPL
42437	2266 T-3	—	October 16, 1977	Palomar	C. J. van Houten, I. van Houten-Groeneveld, T. Gehrels	·	3.3 km	MPC · JPL
42438	2317 T-3	—	October 16, 1977	Palomar	C. J. van Houten, I. van Houten-Groeneveld, T. Gehrels	(6769)	6.2 km	MPC · JPL
42439	2355 T-3	—	October 16, 1977	Palomar	C. J. van Houten, I. van Houten-Groeneveld, T. Gehrels	·	3.7 km	MPC · JPL
42440	2484 T-3	—	October 16, 1977	Palomar	C. J. van Houten, I. van Houten-Groeneveld, T. Gehrels	·	6.1 km	MPC · JPL
42441	2492 T-3	—	October 16, 1977	Palomar	C. J. van Houten, I. van Houten-Groeneveld, T. Gehrels	EOS	6.8 km	MPC · JPL
42442	2603 T-3	—	October 16, 1977	Palomar	C. J. van Houten, I. van Houten-Groeneveld, T. Gehrels	·	5.9 km	MPC · JPL
42443	2640 T-3	—	October 16, 1977	Palomar	C. J. van Houten, I. van Houten-Groeneveld, T. Gehrels	·	2.1 km	MPC · JPL
42444	3064 T-3	—	October 16, 1977	Palomar	C. J. van Houten, I. van Houten-Groeneveld, T. Gehrels	·	3.1 km	MPC · JPL
42445	3123 T-3	—	October 16, 1977	Palomar	C. J. van Houten, I. van Houten-Groeneveld, T. Gehrels	·	7.0 km	MPC · JPL
42446	3248 T-3	—	October 16, 1977	Palomar	C. J. van Houten, I. van Houten-Groeneveld, T. Gehrels	THM	7.7 km	MPC · JPL
42447	3265 T-3	—	October 16, 1977	Palomar	C. J. van Houten, I. van Houten-Groeneveld, T. Gehrels	·	3.2 km	MPC · JPL
42448	3393 T-3	—	October 16, 1977	Palomar	C. J. van Houten, I. van Houten-Groeneveld, T. Gehrels	EOS	6.6 km	MPC · JPL
42449	3496 T-3	—	October 16, 1977	Palomar	C. J. van Houten, I. van Houten-Groeneveld, T. Gehrels	·	7.2 km	MPC · JPL
42450	3504 T-3	—	October 16, 1977	Palomar	C. J. van Houten, I. van Houten-Groeneveld, T. Gehrels	·	1.3 km	MPC · JPL
42451	3727 T-3	—	October 16, 1977	Palomar	C. J. van Houten, I. van Houten-Groeneveld, T. Gehrels	URS	10 km	MPC · JPL
42452	3970 T-3	—	October 16, 1977	Palomar	C. J. van Houten, I. van Houten-Groeneveld, T. Gehrels	·	5.5 km	MPC · JPL
42453	4055 T-3	—	October 16, 1977	Palomar	C. J. van Houten, I. van Houten-Groeneveld, T. Gehrels	EOS	5.0 km	MPC · JPL
42454	4134 T-3	—	October 16, 1977	Palomar	C. J. van Houten, I. van Houten-Groeneveld, T. Gehrels	·	4.7 km	MPC · JPL
42455	4293 T-3	—	October 16, 1977	Palomar	C. J. van Houten, I. van Houten-Groeneveld, T. Gehrels	·	7.3 km	MPC · JPL
42456	4322 T-3	—	October 16, 1977	Palomar	C. J. van Houten, I. van Houten-Groeneveld, T. Gehrels	PAD	4.5 km	MPC · JPL
42457	4341 T-3	—	October 16, 1977	Palomar	C. J. van Houten, I. van Houten-Groeneveld, T. Gehrels	·	6.3 km	MPC · JPL
42458	4359 T-3	—	October 16, 1977	Palomar	C. J. van Houten, I. van Houten-Groeneveld, T. Gehrels	·	4.2 km	MPC · JPL
42459	5036 T-3	—	October 16, 1977	Palomar	C. J. van Houten, I. van Houten-Groeneveld, T. Gehrels	EOS	5.1 km	MPC · JPL
42460	5106 T-3	—	October 16, 1977	Palomar	C. J. van Houten, I. van Houten-Groeneveld, T. Gehrels	·	3.1 km	MPC · JPL
42461	5184 T-3	—	October 16, 1977	Palomar	C. J. van Houten, I. van Houten-Groeneveld, T. Gehrels	·	2.0 km	MPC · JPL
42462	5278 T-3	—	October 17, 1977	Palomar	C. J. van Houten, I. van Houten-Groeneveld, T. Gehrels	·	2.7 km	MPC · JPL
42463	5601 T-3	—	October 16, 1977	Palomar	C. J. van Houten, I. van Houten-Groeneveld, T. Gehrels	EUN	2.5 km	MPC · JPL
42464	1978 RQ_{7}	—	September 2, 1978	La Silla	C.-I. Lagerkvist	(5)	2.9 km	MPC · JPL
42465	1978 VH_{4}	—	November 7, 1978	Palomar	E. F. Helin, S. J. Bus	NYS	3.2 km	MPC · JPL
42466	1978 VP_{6}	—	November 6, 1978	Palomar	E. F. Helin, S. J. Bus	·	3.2 km	MPC · JPL
42467	1978 VX_{6}	—	November 7, 1978	Palomar	E. F. Helin, S. J. Bus	ADE	7.0 km	MPC · JPL
42468	1979 QY_{2}	—	August 22, 1979	La Silla	C.-I. Lagerkvist	·	1.6 km	MPC · JPL
42469	1981 DN_{3}	—	February 28, 1981	Siding Spring	S. J. Bus	·	2.1 km	MPC · JPL
42470	1981 EO_{16}	—	March 6, 1981	Siding Spring	S. J. Bus	·	2.4 km	MPC · JPL
42471	1981 ES_{16}	—	March 6, 1981	Siding Spring	S. J. Bus	·	3.9 km	MPC · JPL
42472	1981 EN_{25}	—	March 2, 1981	Siding Spring	S. J. Bus	·	1.9 km	MPC · JPL
42473	1981 ED_{26}	—	March 2, 1981	Siding Spring	S. J. Bus	·	2.1 km	MPC · JPL
42474	1981 EJ_{27}	—	March 2, 1981	Siding Spring	S. J. Bus	·	1.5 km	MPC · JPL
42475	1981 EW_{28}	—	March 1, 1981	Siding Spring	S. J. Bus	·	1.7 km	MPC · JPL
42476	1981 EP_{36}	—	March 7, 1981	Siding Spring	S. J. Bus	EOS	4.5 km	MPC · JPL
42477	1981 QB_{3}	—	August 24, 1981	La Silla	H. Debehogne	·	6.7 km	MPC · JPL
42478 Inozemtseva	1981 RX_{1}	Inozemtseva	September 7, 1981	Nauchnij	L. G. Karachkina	EUN	5.0 km	MPC · JPL
42479 Tolik	1981 SE_{7}	Tolik	September 28, 1981	Nauchnij	L. V. Zhuravleva	·	11 km	MPC · JPL
42480	1985 RJ	—	September 14, 1985	Anderson Mesa	E. Bowell	·	6.9 km	MPC · JPL
42481	1988 CX_{4}	—	February 13, 1988	La Silla	E. W. Elst	·	4.4 km	MPC · JPL
42482 Fischer-Dieskau	1988 RT_{3}	Fischer-Dieskau	September 8, 1988	Tautenburg Observatory	F. Börngen	NYS	2.9 km	MPC · JPL
42483	1990 VM_{1}	—	November 12, 1990	Kushiro	S. Ueda, H. Kaneda	·	3.4 km	MPC · JPL
42484	1990 WM_{6}	—	November 21, 1990	La Silla	E. W. Elst	·	1.7 km	MPC · JPL
42485 Stendhal	1991 BC_{1}	Stendhal	January 18, 1991	Haute Provence	E. W. Elst	·	1.5 km	MPC · JPL
42486	1991 GY_{2}	—	April 8, 1991	La Silla	E. W. Elst	·	2.7 km	MPC · JPL
42487 Ångström	1991 RY_{2}	Ångström	September 9, 1991	Tautenburg Observatory	F. Börngen, L. D. Schmadel	·	4.0 km	MPC · JPL
42488	1991 RN_{17}	—	September 11, 1991	Palomar	H. E. Holt	·	3.6 km	MPC · JPL
42489	1991 RL_{18}	—	September 13, 1991	Palomar	H. E. Holt	EUN	3.7 km	MPC · JPL
42490	1991 SU	—	September 30, 1991	Siding Spring	R. H. McNaught	·	3.9 km	MPC · JPL
42491	1991 TF	—	October 1, 1991	Siding Spring	R. H. McNaught	JUN	2.7 km	MPC · JPL
42492 Brüggenthies	1991 TD_{7}	Brüggenthies	October 3, 1991	Tautenburg Observatory	L. D. Schmadel, F. Börngen	·	1.9 km	MPC · JPL
42493	1991 TG_{14}	—	October 2, 1991	Palomar	C. P. de Saint-Aignan	LIX	12 km	MPC · JPL
42494	1991 UH_{1}	—	October 29, 1991	Kitt Peak	Spacewatch	RAF	3.7 km	MPC · JPL
42495	1991 VP_{12}	—	November 11, 1991	Kitt Peak	Spacewatch	(5)	2.5 km	MPC · JPL
42496	1991 XB_{1}	—	December 13, 1991	Kiyosato	S. Otomo	·	9.0 km	MPC · JPL
42497	1992 BZ_{1}	—	January 30, 1992	La Silla	E. W. Elst	·	5.8 km	MPC · JPL
42498	1992 DG_{6}	—	February 29, 1992	La Silla	UESAC	·	3.3 km	MPC · JPL
42499	1992 PE_{3}	—	August 6, 1992	Palomar	H. E. Holt	·	3.0 km	MPC · JPL
42500	1992 RV_{6}	—	September 2, 1992	La Silla	E. W. Elst	THM · slow	8.6 km	MPC · JPL

== 42501–42600 ==
back to top

Designation			Discovery			Properties		Ref
Permanent	Provisional	Named after	Date	Site	Discoverer(s)	Category	Diam.	Ref
42501	1992 YC	—	December 17, 1992	Caussols	C. Pollas	·	2.9 km	MPC · JPL
42502	1993 CS_{1}	—	February 10, 1993	Kushiro	S. Ueda, H. Kaneda	·	3.7 km	MPC · JPL
42503	1993 FU_{4}	—	March 17, 1993	La Silla	UESAC	·	3.5 km	MPC · JPL
42504	1993 FC_{8}	—	March 17, 1993	La Silla	UESAC	·	4.4 km	MPC · JPL
42505	1993 FC_{20}	—	March 17, 1993	La Silla	UESAC	·	1.7 km	MPC · JPL
42506	1993 FA_{21}	—	March 21, 1993	La Silla	UESAC	·	4.3 km	MPC · JPL
42507	1993 FJ_{25}	—	March 21, 1993	La Silla	UESAC	·	5.5 km	MPC · JPL
42508	1993 FR_{30}	—	March 21, 1993	La Silla	UESAC	·	2.3 km	MPC · JPL
42509	1993 FV_{33}	—	March 19, 1993	La Silla	UESAC	·	4.2 km	MPC · JPL
42510	1993 FX_{55}	—	March 17, 1993	La Silla	UESAC	·	2.3 km	MPC · JPL
42511	1993 FD_{77}	—	March 21, 1993	La Silla	UESAC	·	3.1 km	MPC · JPL
42512	1993 FW_{81}	—	March 18, 1993	La Silla	UESAC	·	4.2 km	MPC · JPL
42513	1993 SH_{15}	—	September 18, 1993	Palomar	H. E. Holt	·	2.4 km	MPC · JPL
42514	1993 TG_{17}	—	October 9, 1993	La Silla	E. W. Elst	·	5.6 km	MPC · JPL
42515	1993 TJ_{33}	—	October 9, 1993	La Silla	E. W. Elst	·	6.2 km	MPC · JPL
42516 Oistrach	1993 VH_{5}	Oistrach	November 11, 1993	Tautenburg Observatory	F. Börngen	·	5.3 km	MPC · JPL
42517	1993 XU_{1}	—	December 14, 1993	Palomar	E. F. Helin	PHO	3.7 km	MPC · JPL
42518	1994 AH_{6}	—	January 7, 1994	Kitt Peak	Spacewatch	(2076)	3.5 km	MPC · JPL
42519	1994 AU_{6}	—	January 7, 1994	Kitt Peak	Spacewatch	THM ·	6.7 km	MPC · JPL
42520	1994 AB_{8}	—	January 7, 1994	Kitt Peak	Spacewatch	MAS	1.4 km	MPC · JPL
42521	1994 BO_{3}	—	January 16, 1994	Caussols	E. W. Elst, C. Pollas	TIR	12 km	MPC · JPL
42522 Chuckberry	1994 CB_{17}	Chuckberry	February 8, 1994	La Silla	E. W. Elst	NYS	3.0 km	MPC · JPL
42523 Ragazzileonardo	1994 ES	Ragazzileonardo	March 6, 1994	San Marcello	L. Tesi, G. Cattani	PHO	2.1 km	MPC · JPL
42524	1994 PN_{5}	—	August 10, 1994	La Silla	E. W. Elst	·	4.0 km	MPC · JPL
42525	1994 PU_{18}	—	August 12, 1994	La Silla	E. W. Elst	·	3.1 km	MPC · JPL
42526	1994 PA_{36}	—	August 10, 1994	La Silla	E. W. Elst	(17392)	4.5 km	MPC · JPL
42527 Mizutanimasanori	1994 TO_{2}	Mizutanimasanori	October 2, 1994	Kitami	K. Endate, K. Watanabe	GEF	6.1 km	MPC · JPL
42528	1995 FX_{7}	—	March 25, 1995	Kitt Peak	Spacewatch	·	3.8 km	MPC · JPL
42529	1995 FA_{16}	—	March 28, 1995	Kitt Peak	Spacewatch	·	2.3 km	MPC · JPL
42530	1995 GA	—	April 1, 1995	Oizumi	T. Kobayashi	·	2.4 km	MPC · JPL
42531 McKenna	1995 LJ	McKenna	June 5, 1995	Siding Spring	D. J. Asher	·	1.8 km	MPC · JPL
42532	1995 OR	—	July 24, 1995	Nachi-Katsuura	Y. Shimizu, T. Urata	·	2.1 km	MPC · JPL
42533	1995 SM_{19}	—	September 18, 1995	Kitt Peak	Spacewatch	·	2.6 km	MPC · JPL
42534	1995 UL_{7}	—	October 27, 1995	Oizumi	T. Kobayashi	NYS	4.8 km	MPC · JPL
42535	1995 VN_{9}	—	November 15, 1995	Kitt Peak	Spacewatch	·	2.2 km	MPC · JPL
42536	1995 VX_{13}	—	November 15, 1995	Kitt Peak	Spacewatch	·	2.2 km	MPC · JPL
42537	1995 WZ_{1}	—	November 18, 1995	Oizumi	T. Kobayashi	·	3.7 km	MPC · JPL
42538	1995 WZ_{7}	—	November 29, 1995	Oizumi	T. Kobayashi	·	5.2 km	MPC · JPL
42539	1995 WQ_{9}	—	November 16, 1995	Kitt Peak	Spacewatch	·	2.5 km	MPC · JPL
42540	1995 WX_{17}	—	November 17, 1995	Kitt Peak	Spacewatch	·	2.1 km	MPC · JPL
42541	1996 AQ	—	January 11, 1996	Oizumi	T. Kobayashi	·	5.9 km	MPC · JPL
42542	1996 AX	—	January 11, 1996	Oizumi	T. Kobayashi	fast	5.2 km	MPC · JPL
42543	1996 BR	—	January 16, 1996	Sudbury	D. di Cicco	·	7.5 km	MPC · JPL
42544	1996 EL_{2}	—	March 11, 1996	Haleakala	AMOS	·	4.9 km	MPC · JPL
42545	1996 FR_{2}	—	March 21, 1996	Stroncone	A. Vagnozzi	slow	6.5 km	MPC · JPL
42546	1996 GF_{1}	—	April 15, 1996	Višnjan Observatory	Višnjan	·	2.9 km	MPC · JPL
42547	1996 GY_{19}	—	April 15, 1996	La Silla	E. W. Elst	THM	6.6 km	MPC · JPL
42548	1996 HU_{12}	—	April 17, 1996	La Silla	E. W. Elst	·	4.0 km	MPC · JPL
42549	1996 HJ_{17}	—	April 18, 1996	La Silla	E. W. Elst	·	3.1 km	MPC · JPL
42550	1996 HU_{23}	—	April 20, 1996	La Silla	E. W. Elst	·	2.3 km	MPC · JPL
42551	1996 JH_{14}	—	May 12, 1996	Kitt Peak	Spacewatch	·	5.3 km	MPC · JPL
42552	1996 RH_{25}	—	September 11, 1996	Haleakala	NEAT	ERI	4.9 km	MPC · JPL
42553	1996 RN_{25}	—	September 12, 1996	Kitt Peak	Spacewatch	·	3.0 km	MPC · JPL
42554	1996 RJ_{28}	—	September 11, 1996	La Silla	Uppsala-DLR Trojan Survey	L4	27 km	MPC · JPL
42555	1996 RU_{31}	—	September 13, 1996	La Silla	Uppsala-DLR Trojan Survey	L4	18 km	MPC · JPL
42556	1996 TA_{8}	—	October 12, 1996	Sudbury	D. di Cicco	·	1.8 km	MPC · JPL
42557	1996 TB_{67}	—	October 7, 1996	Kitt Peak	Spacewatch	·	1.9 km	MPC · JPL
42558	1996 VV_{15}	—	November 5, 1996	Kitt Peak	Spacewatch	NYS	2.1 km	MPC · JPL
42559	1996 VH_{28}	—	November 11, 1996	Kitt Peak	Spacewatch	·	2.5 km	MPC · JPL
42560	1996 VL_{30}	—	November 7, 1996	Kushiro	S. Ueda, H. Kaneda	·	2.2 km	MPC · JPL
42561	1996 XK_{6}	—	December 3, 1996	Nachi-Katsuura	Y. Shimizu, T. Urata	·	3.2 km	MPC · JPL
42562	1996 XZ_{17}	—	December 7, 1996	Kitt Peak	Spacewatch	·	1.5 km	MPC · JPL
42563	1996 XK_{22}	—	December 8, 1996	Kitt Peak	Spacewatch	NYS	1.4 km	MPC · JPL
42564	1996 XF_{23}	—	December 12, 1996	Kitt Peak	Spacewatch	V	2.1 km	MPC · JPL
42565	1996 XF_{24}	—	December 5, 1996	Kitt Peak	Spacewatch	·	4.6 km	MPC · JPL
42566 Ryutaro	1996 XQ_{25}	Ryutaro	December 3, 1996	Geisei	T. Seki	·	2.7 km	MPC · JPL
42567	1996 XF_{33}	—	December 6, 1996	Xinglong	SCAP	·	3.0 km	MPC · JPL
42568	1996 YC	—	December 20, 1996	Oizumi	T. Kobayashi	PHO	3.4 km	MPC · JPL
42569	1996 YC_{1}	—	December 20, 1996	Oizumi	T. Kobayashi	·	2.8 km	MPC · JPL
42570	1996 YA_{2}	—	December 20, 1996	Xinglong	SCAP	·	6.1 km	MPC · JPL
42571	1996 YL_{3}	—	December 18, 1996	Xinglong	SCAP	·	5.7 km	MPC · JPL
42572	1997 AO	—	January 2, 1997	Oizumi	T. Kobayashi	PHO	3.4 km	MPC · JPL
42573	1997 AN_{1}	—	January 2, 1997	Oizumi	T. Kobayashi	EUN	4.7 km	MPC · JPL
42574	1997 AE_{3}	—	January 4, 1997	Oizumi	T. Kobayashi	EUN	3.1 km	MPC · JPL
42575	1997 AD_{4}	—	January 6, 1997	Oizumi	T. Kobayashi	·	3.5 km	MPC · JPL
42576	1997 AP_{5}	—	January 7, 1997	Oizumi	T. Kobayashi	(5)	3.3 km	MPC · JPL
42577	1997 AB_{18}	—	January 15, 1997	Oizumi	T. Kobayashi	V	2.9 km	MPC · JPL
42578	1997 BD_{5}	—	January 31, 1997	Kitt Peak	Spacewatch	NYS	2.7 km	MPC · JPL
42579	1997 BV_{5}	—	January 31, 1997	Prescott	P. G. Comba	·	3.3 km	MPC · JPL
42580	1997 CX_{22}	—	February 3, 1997	Kitt Peak	Spacewatch	·	2.6 km	MPC · JPL
42581	1997 CB_{29}	—	February 7, 1997	Xinglong	SCAP	·	3.1 km	MPC · JPL
42582	1997 EW_{4}	—	March 2, 1997	Kitt Peak	Spacewatch	·	4.1 km	MPC · JPL
42583	1997 EP_{33}	—	March 4, 1997	Socorro	LINEAR	·	6.0 km	MPC · JPL
42584	1997 ET_{46}	—	March 12, 1997	La Silla	E. W. Elst	EOS	4.6 km	MPC · JPL
42585 Pheidippides	1997 FJ_{1}	Pheidippides	March 30, 1997	Colleverde	V. S. Casulli	·	3.1 km	MPC · JPL
42586	1997 FG_{3}	—	March 31, 1997	Socorro	LINEAR	·	4.1 km	MPC · JPL
42587	1997 GW_{6}	—	April 2, 1997	Socorro	LINEAR	·	5.5 km	MPC · JPL
42588	1997 GU_{15}	—	April 3, 1997	Socorro	LINEAR	·	1.3 km	MPC · JPL
42589	1997 GP_{33}	—	April 3, 1997	Socorro	LINEAR	·	3.1 km	MPC · JPL
42590	1997 GW_{34}	—	April 3, 1997	Socorro	LINEAR	·	3.3 km	MPC · JPL
42591	1997 GE_{42}	—	April 9, 1997	La Silla	E. W. Elst	·	3.3 km	MPC · JPL
42592	1997 HT	—	April 28, 1997	Kitt Peak	Spacewatch	·	5.8 km	MPC · JPL
42593 Antoniazzi	1997 JQ	Antoniazzi	May 1, 1997	Bologna	San Vittore	·	3.1 km	MPC · JPL
42594	1997 JQ_{1}	—	May 1, 1997	Caussols	ODAS	·	5.3 km	MPC · JPL
42595	1997 PL	—	August 1, 1997	Haleakala	NEAT	·	2.5 km	MPC · JPL
42596	1997 SB	—	September 18, 1997	Modra	Zigo, P., Pravda, A.	H	1.0 km	MPC · JPL
42597	1997 SR_{5}	—	September 23, 1997	Kitt Peak	Spacewatch	·	2.1 km	MPC · JPL
42598	1997 UD_{8}	—	October 29, 1997	Kleť	Kleť	·	5.3 km	MPC · JPL
42599	1997 UT_{22}	—	October 25, 1997	Nyukasa	M. Hirasawa, S. Suzuki	·	12 km	MPC · JPL
42600	1997 YF_{10}	—	December 28, 1997	Oizumi	T. Kobayashi	·	4.3 km	MPC · JPL

== 42601–42700 ==
back to top

Designation			Discovery			Properties		Ref
Permanent	Provisional	Named after	Date	Site	Discoverer(s)	Category	Diam.	Ref
42601	1998 AN_{10}	—	January 2, 1998	Reedy Creek	J. Broughton	·	2.5 km	MPC · JPL
42602	1998 BX_{6}	—	January 24, 1998	Oizumi	T. Kobayashi	·	4.3 km	MPC · JPL
42603	1998 BP_{12}	—	January 23, 1998	Socorro	LINEAR	·	2.5 km	MPC · JPL
42604	1998 BT_{15}	—	January 24, 1998	Haleakala	NEAT	·	3.9 km	MPC · JPL
42605	1998 BR_{25}	—	January 27, 1998	Kleť	Kleť	·	1.4 km	MPC · JPL
42606	1998 DD	—	February 16, 1998	Xinglong	SCAP	·	3.5 km	MPC · JPL
42607	1998 DQ_{10}	—	February 23, 1998	Haleakala	NEAT	·	3.9 km	MPC · JPL
42608	1998 DD_{24}	—	February 28, 1998	Oaxaca	Roe, J. M.	·	2.5 km	MPC · JPL
42609 Daubechies	1998 DB_{34}	Daubechies	February 27, 1998	La Silla	E. W. Elst	·	4.0 km	MPC · JPL
42610	1998 DD_{35}	—	February 27, 1998	La Silla	E. W. Elst	NYS	2.8 km	MPC · JPL
42611 Manchu	1998 EU_{1}	Manchu	March 2, 1998	Caussols	ODAS	NYS	2.3 km	MPC · JPL
42612	1998 EL_{3}	—	March 1, 1998	Kitt Peak	Spacewatch	·	2.2 km	MPC · JPL
42613 Schaller	1998 EC_{4}	Schaller	March 2, 1998	Kitt Peak	Spacewatch	·	2.4 km	MPC · JPL
42614 Ubaldina	1998 EY_{6}	Ubaldina	March 2, 1998	San Marcello	L. Tesi, Caronia, A.	·	2.0 km	MPC · JPL
42615	1998 EV_{11}	—	March 1, 1998	La Silla	E. W. Elst	·	1.8 km	MPC · JPL
42616	1998 EX_{20}	—	March 3, 1998	La Silla	E. W. Elst	NYS	3.3 km	MPC · JPL
42617	1998 FJ_{1}	—	March 20, 1998	Woomera	F. B. Zoltowski	V	1.7 km	MPC · JPL
42618 Bardabelias	1998 FM_{8}	Bardabelias	March 21, 1998	Kitt Peak	Spacewatch	·	2.8 km	MPC · JPL
42619	1998 FE_{12}	—	March 25, 1998	Kleť	Kleť	·	3.8 km	MPC · JPL
42620	1998 FS_{13}	—	March 26, 1998	Haleakala	NEAT	·	2.9 km	MPC · JPL
42621	1998 FW_{20}	—	March 20, 1998	Socorro	LINEAR	·	3.3 km	MPC · JPL
42622	1998 FF_{26}	—	March 20, 1998	Socorro	LINEAR	·	3.0 km	MPC · JPL
42623	1998 FT_{27}	—	March 20, 1998	Socorro	LINEAR	·	2.0 km	MPC · JPL
42624	1998 FJ_{28}	—	March 20, 1998	Socorro	LINEAR	·	2.7 km	MPC · JPL
42625	1998 FZ_{29}	—	March 20, 1998	Socorro	LINEAR	·	2.7 km	MPC · JPL
42626	1998 FU_{31}	—	March 20, 1998	Socorro	LINEAR	MAS	1.7 km	MPC · JPL
42627	1998 FF_{33}	—	March 20, 1998	Socorro	LINEAR	·	2.7 km	MPC · JPL
42628	1998 FH_{41}	—	March 20, 1998	Socorro	LINEAR	NYS	2.1 km	MPC · JPL
42629	1998 FL_{43}	—	March 20, 1998	Socorro	LINEAR	·	2.7 km	MPC · JPL
42630	1998 FE_{47}	—	March 20, 1998	Socorro	LINEAR	·	3.3 km	MPC · JPL
42631	1998 FR_{48}	—	March 20, 1998	Socorro	LINEAR	·	2.3 km	MPC · JPL
42632	1998 FQ_{53}	—	March 20, 1998	Socorro	LINEAR	·	2.7 km	MPC · JPL
42633	1998 FW_{58}	—	March 20, 1998	Socorro	LINEAR	·	3.2 km	MPC · JPL
42634	1998 FF_{60}	—	March 20, 1998	Socorro	LINEAR	·	3.1 km	MPC · JPL
42635	1998 FS_{60}	—	March 20, 1998	Socorro	LINEAR	MAS	1.9 km	MPC · JPL
42636	1998 FO_{61}	—	March 20, 1998	Socorro	LINEAR	·	2.5 km	MPC · JPL
42637	1998 FZ_{61}	—	March 20, 1998	Socorro	LINEAR	·	5.4 km	MPC · JPL
42638	1998 FL_{62}	—	March 20, 1998	Socorro	LINEAR	·	4.6 km	MPC · JPL
42639	1998 FW_{63}	—	March 20, 1998	Socorro	LINEAR	NYS	3.4 km	MPC · JPL
42640	1998 FX_{63}	—	March 20, 1998	Socorro	LINEAR	NYS	3.1 km	MPC · JPL
42641	1998 FD_{65}	—	March 20, 1998	Socorro	LINEAR	·	2.1 km	MPC · JPL
42642	1998 FQ_{66}	—	March 20, 1998	Socorro	LINEAR	·	2.7 km	MPC · JPL
42643	1998 FX_{66}	—	March 20, 1998	Socorro	LINEAR	MAS	2.0 km	MPC · JPL
42644	1998 FE_{67}	—	March 20, 1998	Socorro	LINEAR	V	3.9 km	MPC · JPL
42645	1998 FW_{67}	—	March 20, 1998	Socorro	LINEAR	·	5.6 km	MPC · JPL
42646	1998 FF_{69}	—	March 20, 1998	Socorro	LINEAR	MAS	2.0 km	MPC · JPL
42647	1998 FY_{69}	—	March 20, 1998	Socorro	LINEAR	·	2.3 km	MPC · JPL
42648	1998 FR_{72}	—	March 20, 1998	Socorro	LINEAR	·	2.4 km	MPC · JPL
42649	1998 FM_{76}	—	March 24, 1998	Socorro	LINEAR	·	2.7 km	MPC · JPL
42650	1998 FZ_{76}	—	March 24, 1998	Socorro	LINEAR	NYS	3.0 km	MPC · JPL
42651	1998 FF_{77}	—	March 24, 1998	Socorro	LINEAR	·	2.2 km	MPC · JPL
42652	1998 FS_{78}	—	March 24, 1998	Socorro	LINEAR	·	2.9 km	MPC · JPL
42653	1998 FE_{88}	—	March 24, 1998	Socorro	LINEAR	V	2.0 km	MPC · JPL
42654	1998 FC_{107}	—	March 31, 1998	Socorro	LINEAR	·	4.4 km	MPC · JPL
42655	1998 FU_{108}	—	March 31, 1998	Socorro	LINEAR	V	2.8 km	MPC · JPL
42656	1998 FU_{113}	—	March 31, 1998	Socorro	LINEAR	·	2.3 km	MPC · JPL
42657	1998 FC_{117}	—	March 31, 1998	Socorro	LINEAR	V	2.4 km	MPC · JPL
42658	1998 FQ_{118}	—	March 31, 1998	Socorro	LINEAR	V	1.5 km	MPC · JPL
42659	1998 FR_{121}	—	March 20, 1998	Socorro	LINEAR	·	2.3 km	MPC · JPL
42660	1998 FR_{126}	—	March 29, 1998	Višnjan Observatory	Višnjan	V	1.8 km	MPC · JPL
42661	1998 FT_{126}	—	March 29, 1998	Višnjan Observatory	Višnjan	ADE	6.1 km	MPC · JPL
42662	1998 FQ_{133}	—	March 20, 1998	Socorro	LINEAR	·	2.6 km	MPC · JPL
42663	1998 FD_{134}	—	March 20, 1998	Socorro	LINEAR	·	3.2 km	MPC · JPL
42664	1998 FG_{143}	—	March 29, 1998	Socorro	LINEAR	·	3.7 km	MPC · JPL
42665 Kristinblock	1998 HF_{4}	Kristinblock	April 19, 1998	Kitt Peak	Spacewatch	V	1.7 km	MPC · JPL
42666	1998 HU_{6}	—	April 22, 1998	Caussols	ODAS	·	2.8 km	MPC · JPL
42667	1998 HK_{20}	—	April 20, 1998	Socorro	LINEAR	·	2.1 km	MPC · JPL
42668	1998 HR_{20}	—	April 20, 1998	Socorro	LINEAR	·	3.7 km	MPC · JPL
42669	1998 HH_{33}	—	April 20, 1998	Socorro	LINEAR	·	3.3 km	MPC · JPL
42670	1998 HY_{35}	—	April 20, 1998	Socorro	LINEAR	·	3.2 km	MPC · JPL
42671	1998 HQ_{68}	—	April 21, 1998	Socorro	LINEAR	V	2.7 km	MPC · JPL
42672	1998 HL_{91}	—	April 21, 1998	Socorro	LINEAR	V	2.7 km	MPC · JPL
42673	1998 HL_{94}	—	April 21, 1998	Socorro	LINEAR	·	2.4 km	MPC · JPL
42674	1998 HS_{95}	—	April 21, 1998	Socorro	LINEAR	NYS	3.7 km	MPC · JPL
42675	1998 HW_{119}	—	April 23, 1998	Socorro	LINEAR	V	2.8 km	MPC · JPL
42676	1998 HS_{121}	—	April 23, 1998	Socorro	LINEAR	GEF	2.8 km	MPC · JPL
42677	1998 HY_{129}	—	April 19, 1998	Socorro	LINEAR	MAS	1.5 km	MPC · JPL
42678	1998 HR_{130}	—	April 19, 1998	Socorro	LINEAR	MAS	1.6 km	MPC · JPL
42679	1998 HL_{138}	—	April 21, 1998	Socorro	LINEAR	·	2.2 km	MPC · JPL
42680	1998 HL_{143}	—	April 21, 1998	Socorro	LINEAR	·	2.5 km	MPC · JPL
42681	1998 HV_{143}	—	April 21, 1998	Socorro	LINEAR	·	2.4 km	MPC · JPL
42682	1998 HF_{145}	—	April 21, 1998	Socorro	LINEAR	V	3.2 km	MPC · JPL
42683	1998 HS_{148}	—	April 25, 1998	La Silla	E. W. Elst	·	2.2 km	MPC · JPL
42684	1998 HQ_{150}	—	April 20, 1998	Kitt Peak	Spacewatch	NYS	2.1 km	MPC · JPL
42685	1998 JY	—	May 1, 1998	Haleakala	NEAT	PHO	4.3 km	MPC · JPL
42686	1998 JH_{1}	—	May 1, 1998	Haleakala	NEAT	·	4.8 km	MPC · JPL
42687	1998 JS_{1}	—	May 1, 1998	Haleakala	NEAT	V	2.1 km	MPC · JPL
42688	1998 JV_{4}	—	May 1, 1998	Socorro	LINEAR	·	2.8 km	MPC · JPL
42689	1998 KX	—	May 23, 1998	Prescott	P. G. Comba	·	2.5 km	MPC · JPL
42690	1998 KY_{5}	—	May 24, 1998	Kitt Peak	Spacewatch	·	2.7 km	MPC · JPL
42691	1998 KT_{11}	—	May 23, 1998	Kitt Peak	Spacewatch	·	2.1 km	MPC · JPL
42692	1998 KG_{35}	—	May 22, 1998	Socorro	LINEAR	·	3.1 km	MPC · JPL
42693	1998 KQ_{38}	—	May 22, 1998	Socorro	LINEAR	NYS	2.9 km	MPC · JPL
42694	1998 KQ_{44}	—	May 22, 1998	Socorro	LINEAR	·	3.9 km	MPC · JPL
42695	1998 KM_{54}	—	May 23, 1998	Socorro	LINEAR	·	2.6 km	MPC · JPL
42696	1998 KO_{62}	—	May 22, 1998	Socorro	LINEAR	·	3.6 km	MPC · JPL
42697 Lucapaolini	1998 LP_{2}	Lucapaolini	June 1, 1998	La Silla	E. W. Elst	·	3.1 km	MPC · JPL
42698	1998 MB_{1}	—	June 19, 1998	Kitt Peak	Spacewatch	·	3.9 km	MPC · JPL
42699	1998 MO_{8}	—	June 19, 1998	Socorro	LINEAR	·	3.2 km	MPC · JPL
42700	1998 MO_{10}	—	June 19, 1998	Socorro	LINEAR	·	8.5 km	MPC · JPL

== 42701–42800 ==
back to top

Designation			Discovery			Properties		Ref
Permanent	Provisional	Named after	Date	Site	Discoverer(s)	Category	Diam.	Ref
42701	1998 MD_{13}	—	June 19, 1998	Socorro	LINEAR	·	5.9 km	MPC · JPL
42702	1998 ME_{19}	—	June 19, 1998	Socorro	LINEAR	·	3.5 km	MPC · JPL
42703	1998 MM_{29}	—	June 24, 1998	Socorro	LINEAR	EUN	3.9 km	MPC · JPL
42704	1998 MB_{32}	—	June 24, 1998	Socorro	LINEAR	MAR	5.3 km	MPC · JPL
42705	1998 OW_{8}	—	July 26, 1998	La Silla	E. W. Elst	·	4.7 km	MPC · JPL
42706	1998 QY	—	August 19, 1998	Prescott	P. G. Comba	EUN	3.8 km	MPC · JPL
42707	1998 QM_{2}	—	August 17, 1998	Višnjan Observatory	Višnjan	·	3.3 km	MPC · JPL
42708	1998 QD_{11}	—	August 17, 1998	Socorro	LINEAR	·	12 km	MPC · JPL
42709	1998 QM_{17}	—	August 17, 1998	Socorro	LINEAR	·	3.3 km	MPC · JPL
42710	1998 QD_{20}	—	August 17, 1998	Socorro	LINEAR	·	7.5 km	MPC · JPL
42711	1998 QY_{25}	—	August 25, 1998	Višnjan Observatory	Višnjan	·	8.0 km	MPC · JPL
42712	1998 QX_{28}	—	August 23, 1998	Xinglong	SCAP	TIR	6.2 km	MPC · JPL
42713	1998 QS_{33}	—	August 17, 1998	Socorro	LINEAR	·	7.6 km	MPC · JPL
42714	1998 QW_{38}	—	August 17, 1998	Socorro	LINEAR	RAF	3.2 km	MPC · JPL
42715	1998 QE_{44}	—	August 17, 1998	Socorro	LINEAR	·	2.0 km	MPC · JPL
42716	1998 QQ_{44}	—	August 17, 1998	Socorro	LINEAR	·	6.4 km	MPC · JPL
42717	1998 QM_{47}	—	August 19, 1998	Socorro	LINEAR	EOS	5.2 km	MPC · JPL
42718	1998 QU_{52}	—	August 20, 1998	Anderson Mesa	LONEOS	·	5.7 km	MPC · JPL
42719	1998 QL_{66}	—	August 24, 1998	Socorro	LINEAR	EUN	4.1 km	MPC · JPL
42720	1998 QH_{69}	—	August 24, 1998	Socorro	LINEAR	·	6.6 km	MPC · JPL
42721	1998 QM_{70}	—	August 24, 1998	Socorro	LINEAR	EUN	3.1 km	MPC · JPL
42722	1998 QX_{70}	—	August 24, 1998	Socorro	LINEAR	EOS	5.5 km	MPC · JPL
42723	1998 QL_{73}	—	August 24, 1998	Socorro	LINEAR	EOS	6.6 km	MPC · JPL
42724	1998 QJ_{76}	—	August 24, 1998	Socorro	LINEAR	EUN	7.0 km	MPC · JPL
42725	1998 QK_{80}	—	August 24, 1998	Socorro	LINEAR	MAR	5.1 km	MPC · JPL
42726	1998 QW_{84}	—	August 24, 1998	Socorro	LINEAR	·	3.8 km	MPC · JPL
42727	1998 QX_{85}	—	August 24, 1998	Socorro	LINEAR	·	10 km	MPC · JPL
42728	1998 QX_{86}	—	August 24, 1998	Socorro	LINEAR	·	10 km	MPC · JPL
42729	1998 QE_{90}	—	August 24, 1998	Socorro	LINEAR	·	3.5 km	MPC · JPL
42730	1998 QE_{106}	—	August 25, 1998	La Silla	E. W. Elst	·	4.2 km	MPC · JPL
42731	1998 QJ_{106}	—	August 25, 1998	La Silla	E. W. Elst	EOS	5.1 km	MPC · JPL
42732	1998 RD_{1}	—	September 12, 1998	Oizumi	T. Kobayashi	VER	14 km	MPC · JPL
42733 Andrébaranne	1998 RH_{2}	Andrébaranne	September 15, 1998	Caussols	ODAS	·	2.6 km	MPC · JPL
42734	1998 RH_{19}	—	September 14, 1998	Socorro	LINEAR	·	5.1 km	MPC · JPL
42735	1998 RZ_{19}	—	September 14, 1998	Socorro	LINEAR	BRA	4.8 km	MPC · JPL
42736	1998 RJ_{25}	—	September 14, 1998	Socorro	LINEAR	·	4.9 km	MPC · JPL
42737	1998 RJ_{45}	—	September 14, 1998	Socorro	LINEAR	·	7.8 km	MPC · JPL
42738	1998 RK_{46}	—	September 14, 1998	Socorro	LINEAR	·	7.0 km	MPC · JPL
42739	1998 RJ_{57}	—	September 14, 1998	Socorro	LINEAR	·	6.2 km	MPC · JPL
42740	1998 RY_{62}	—	September 14, 1998	Socorro	LINEAR	VER	7.1 km	MPC · JPL
42741	1998 RW_{65}	—	September 14, 1998	Socorro	LINEAR	KOR	3.7 km	MPC · JPL
42742	1998 RT_{66}	—	September 14, 1998	Socorro	LINEAR	·	6.6 km	MPC · JPL
42743	1998 RP_{73}	—	September 14, 1998	Socorro	LINEAR	·	5.1 km	MPC · JPL
42744	1998 RH_{74}	—	September 14, 1998	Socorro	LINEAR	·	8.6 km	MPC · JPL
42745	1998 RK_{77}	—	September 14, 1998	Socorro	LINEAR	·	6.9 km	MPC · JPL
42746	1998 SV_{8}	—	September 20, 1998	Kitt Peak	Spacewatch	THM	5.3 km	MPC · JPL
42747 Fuser	1998 SU_{10}	Fuser	September 21, 1998	Pianoro	V. Goretti	THM	9.9 km	MPC · JPL
42748 Andrisani	1998 SV_{10}	Andrisani	September 21, 1998	Pianoro	V. Goretti	·	4.5 km	MPC · JPL
42749	1998 SL_{25}	—	September 22, 1998	Anderson Mesa	LONEOS	·	7.2 km	MPC · JPL
42750	1998 SO_{53}	—	September 16, 1998	Anderson Mesa	LONEOS	EOS	4.6 km	MPC · JPL
42751	1998 SP_{55}	—	September 16, 1998	Anderson Mesa	LONEOS	·	4.3 km	MPC · JPL
42752	1998 SV_{55}	—	September 16, 1998	Anderson Mesa	LONEOS	·	8.8 km	MPC · JPL
42753	1998 SS_{59}	—	September 17, 1998	Anderson Mesa	LONEOS	·	10 km	MPC · JPL
42754	1998 SN_{60}	—	September 17, 1998	Anderson Mesa	LONEOS	·	4.2 km	MPC · JPL
42755	1998 ST_{61}	—	September 17, 1998	Anderson Mesa	LONEOS	·	7.5 km	MPC · JPL
42756	1998 SA_{63}	—	September 25, 1998	Xinglong	SCAP	fast	7.4 km	MPC · JPL
42757	1998 SY_{67}	—	September 19, 1998	Socorro	LINEAR	·	7.5 km	MPC · JPL
42758	1998 SD_{72}	—	September 21, 1998	La Silla	E. W. Elst	·	6.2 km	MPC · JPL
42759	1998 SR_{73}	—	September 21, 1998	La Silla	E. W. Elst	·	9.0 km	MPC · JPL
42760	1998 SY_{78}	—	September 26, 1998	Socorro	LINEAR	·	4.1 km	MPC · JPL
42761	1998 SK_{104}	—	September 26, 1998	Socorro	LINEAR	·	3.8 km	MPC · JPL
42762	1998 SB_{116}	—	September 26, 1998	Socorro	LINEAR	·	7.0 km	MPC · JPL
42763	1998 SV_{119}	—	September 26, 1998	Socorro	LINEAR	·	1.8 km	MPC · JPL
42764	1998 SJ_{122}	—	September 26, 1998	Socorro	LINEAR	(1298)	9.6 km	MPC · JPL
42765	1998 SR_{137}	—	September 26, 1998	Socorro	LINEAR	·	9.8 km	MPC · JPL
42766	1998 SN_{143}	—	September 18, 1998	La Silla	E. W. Elst	EOS	5.7 km	MPC · JPL
42767	1998 SJ_{150}	—	September 26, 1998	Socorro	LINEAR	CYB	12 km	MPC · JPL
42768	1998 SA_{168}	—	September 19, 1998	Anderson Mesa	LONEOS	·	6.6 km	MPC · JPL
42769	1998 TA_{1}	—	October 12, 1998	Kitt Peak	Spacewatch	·	7.4 km	MPC · JPL
42770	1998 TH_{5}	—	October 13, 1998	Višnjan Observatory	K. Korlević	THM	9.8 km	MPC · JPL
42771	1998 TB_{32}	—	October 11, 1998	Anderson Mesa	LONEOS	·	4.0 km	MPC · JPL
42772 Kokotanekova	1998 TJ_{34}	Kokotanekova	October 14, 1998	Anderson Mesa	LONEOS	HYG	6.6 km	MPC · JPL
42773	1998 UN_{15}	—	October 23, 1998	Višnjan Observatory	K. Korlević	THM	7.2 km	MPC · JPL
42774	1998 UZ_{20}	—	October 29, 1998	Višnjan Observatory	K. Korlević	·	2.7 km	MPC · JPL
42775 Bianchini	1998 UO_{23}	Bianchini	October 26, 1998	Cima Ekar	U. Munari, Castellani, F.	·	12 km	MPC · JPL
42776 Casablanca	1998 UV_{26}	Casablanca	October 18, 1998	La Silla	E. W. Elst	VER ·	10 km	MPC · JPL
42777	1998 UY_{30}	—	October 18, 1998	La Silla	E. W. Elst	·	8.7 km	MPC · JPL
42778	1998 UC_{33}	—	October 28, 1998	Socorro	LINEAR	GEF	3.3 km	MPC · JPL
42779	1998 VD_{13}	—	November 10, 1998	Socorro	LINEAR	KOR	5.0 km	MPC · JPL
42780	1998 VW_{17}	—	November 10, 1998	Socorro	LINEAR	·	11 km	MPC · JPL
42781	1998 VL_{28}	—	November 10, 1998	Socorro	LINEAR	·	6.5 km	MPC · JPL
42782	1998 VC_{48}	—	November 15, 1998	Kitt Peak	Spacewatch	·	10 km	MPC · JPL
42783	1998 VV_{53}	—	November 14, 1998	Socorro	LINEAR	(3025)	20 km	MPC · JPL
42784	1998 WD_{1}	—	November 16, 1998	Catalina	CSS	·	13 km	MPC · JPL
42785	1998 WJ_{1}	—	November 18, 1998	Catalina	CSS	PHO	3.3 km	MPC · JPL
42786	1998 WU_{4}	—	November 18, 1998	Catalina	CSS	PHO	4.8 km	MPC · JPL
42787	1998 WC_{16}	—	November 21, 1998	Socorro	LINEAR	EOS · slow	7.9 km	MPC · JPL
42788	1998 XF_{13}	—	December 15, 1998	Caussols	ODAS	·	4.1 km	MPC · JPL
42789	1998 XP_{74}	—	December 14, 1998	Socorro	LINEAR	V	2.5 km	MPC · JPL
42790	1998 XS_{93}	—	December 15, 1998	Socorro	LINEAR	MAR	5.9 km	MPC · JPL
42791	1999 AD_{6}	—	January 15, 1999	Kitt Peak	Spacewatch	·	3.9 km	MPC · JPL
42792	1999 AM_{13}	—	January 7, 1999	Kitt Peak	Spacewatch	V	1.3 km	MPC · JPL
42793	1999 BN_{5}	—	January 19, 1999	Grasslands	McGaha, J.	·	5.5 km	MPC · JPL
42794	1999 BL_{18}	—	January 16, 1999	Socorro	LINEAR	·	4.5 km	MPC · JPL
42795 Derekmuller	1999 CO_{12}	Derekmuller	February 14, 1999	Caussols	ODAS	·	3.2 km	MPC · JPL
42796	1999 CP_{53}	—	February 10, 1999	Socorro	LINEAR	·	2.3 km	MPC · JPL
42797	1999 CL_{76}	—	February 12, 1999	Socorro	LINEAR	MAR	8.6 km	MPC · JPL
42798	1999 DH_{2}	—	February 19, 1999	Oizumi	T. Kobayashi	·	3.7 km	MPC · JPL
42799	1999 DV_{5}	—	February 17, 1999	Socorro	LINEAR	·	8.6 km	MPC · JPL
42800	1999 FB_{28}	—	March 19, 1999	Socorro	LINEAR	HNS	5.5 km	MPC · JPL

== 42801–42900 ==
back to top

Designation			Discovery			Properties		Ref
Permanent	Provisional	Named after	Date	Site	Discoverer(s)	Category	Diam.	Ref
42801	1999 FK_{41}	—	March 20, 1999	Socorro	LINEAR	·	6.8 km	MPC · JPL
42802	1999 GE_{15}	—	April 15, 1999	Socorro	LINEAR	·	5.4 km	MPC · JPL
42803	1999 GG_{21}	—	April 15, 1999	Socorro	LINEAR	GEF	6.4 km	MPC · JPL
42804	1999 GQ_{33}	—	April 12, 1999	Socorro	LINEAR	·	2.8 km	MPC · JPL
42805	1999 JU_{1}	—	May 8, 1999	Catalina	CSS	·	2.6 km	MPC · JPL
42806	1999 JR_{3}	—	May 10, 1999	Socorro	LINEAR	H	2.4 km	MPC · JPL
42807	1999 JM_{12}	—	May 8, 1999	Catalina	CSS	PHO	3.3 km	MPC · JPL
42808	1999 JZ_{13}	—	May 12, 1999	Socorro	LINEAR	PHO	3.1 km	MPC · JPL
42809	1999 JJ_{20}	—	May 10, 1999	Socorro	LINEAR	CYB	14 km	MPC · JPL
42810	1999 JP_{72}	—	May 12, 1999	Socorro	LINEAR	·	2.9 km	MPC · JPL
42811	1999 JN_{81}	—	May 7, 1999	Socorro	LINEAR	H	2.8 km	MPC · JPL
42812	1999 JC_{94}	—	May 12, 1999	Socorro	LINEAR	DOR	9.8 km	MPC · JPL
42813	1999 JU_{121}	—	May 13, 1999	Socorro	LINEAR	slow	3.1 km	MPC · JPL
42814	1999 LR_{13}	—	June 9, 1999	Socorro	LINEAR	·	1.9 km	MPC · JPL
42815	1999 LH_{32}	—	June 15, 1999	Kitt Peak	Spacewatch	NYS	3.1 km	MPC · JPL
42816	1999 NZ_{1}	—	July 12, 1999	Socorro	LINEAR	·	4.7 km	MPC · JPL
42817	1999 NB_{4}	—	July 13, 1999	Socorro	LINEAR	·	2.2 km	MPC · JPL
42818	1999 NU_{4}	—	July 12, 1999	Višnjan Observatory	K. Korlević	·	2.2 km	MPC · JPL
42819	1999 NF_{5}	—	July 15, 1999	Višnjan Observatory	K. Korlević	NYS	3.6 km	MPC · JPL
42820	1999 NA_{7}	—	July 13, 1999	Socorro	LINEAR	·	3.8 km	MPC · JPL
42821	1999 NV_{11}	—	July 13, 1999	Socorro	LINEAR	·	2.2 km	MPC · JPL
42822	1999 NT_{13}	—	July 14, 1999	Socorro	LINEAR	·	1.7 km	MPC · JPL
42823	1999 NO_{15}	—	July 14, 1999	Socorro	LINEAR	·	1.5 km	MPC · JPL
42824	1999 NF_{16}	—	July 14, 1999	Socorro	LINEAR	·	2.8 km	MPC · JPL
42825	1999 NK_{26}	—	July 14, 1999	Socorro	LINEAR	·	2.0 km	MPC · JPL
42826	1999 NX_{26}	—	July 14, 1999	Socorro	LINEAR	·	1.9 km	MPC · JPL
42827	1999 NC_{36}	—	July 14, 1999	Socorro	LINEAR	·	2.1 km	MPC · JPL
42828	1999 NH_{39}	—	July 14, 1999	Socorro	LINEAR	·	2.1 km	MPC · JPL
42829	1999 NN_{39}	—	July 14, 1999	Socorro	LINEAR	·	3.2 km	MPC · JPL
42830	1999 NE_{40}	—	July 14, 1999	Socorro	LINEAR	·	2.0 km	MPC · JPL
42831	1999 NF_{43}	—	July 13, 1999	Socorro	LINEAR	·	5.4 km	MPC · JPL
42832	1999 NL_{44}	—	July 13, 1999	Socorro	LINEAR	PHO	3.1 km	MPC · JPL
42833	1999 NH_{48}	—	July 13, 1999	Socorro	LINEAR	ADE	8.1 km	MPC · JPL
42834	1999 NU_{48}	—	July 13, 1999	Socorro	LINEAR	·	2.5 km	MPC · JPL
42835	1999 NS_{56}	—	July 12, 1999	Socorro	LINEAR	MAR	5.4 km	MPC · JPL
42836	1999 OO_{3}	—	July 22, 1999	Socorro	LINEAR	·	3.2 km	MPC · JPL
42837 Waltrobinson	1999 PR_{1}	Waltrobinson	August 9, 1999	Reedy Creek	J. Broughton	·	7.5 km	MPC · JPL
42838	1999 PP_{3}	—	August 13, 1999	Ondřejov	P. Pravec, P. Kušnirák	·	3.5 km	MPC · JPL
42839	1999 PP_{6}	—	August 7, 1999	Anderson Mesa	LONEOS	·	1.5 km	MPC · JPL
42840	1999 RU	—	September 4, 1999	Reedy Creek	J. Broughton	·	2.5 km	MPC · JPL
42841	1999 RO_{3}	—	September 4, 1999	Catalina	CSS	·	2.1 km	MPC · JPL
42842	1999 RK_{9}	—	September 4, 1999	Kitt Peak	Spacewatch	·	1.8 km	MPC · JPL
42843	1999 RV_{11}	—	September 7, 1999	Socorro	LINEAR	PHO · slow	2.5 km	MPC · JPL
42844	1999 RC_{12}	—	September 7, 1999	Socorro	LINEAR	·	2.1 km	MPC · JPL
42845	1999 RV_{16}	—	September 7, 1999	Socorro	LINEAR	NYS ·	4.9 km	MPC · JPL
42846	1999 RJ_{26}	—	September 7, 1999	Socorro	LINEAR	·	2.8 km	MPC · JPL
42847	1999 RC_{43}	—	September 11, 1999	Siding Spring	R. H. McNaught	·	3.5 km	MPC · JPL
42848	1999 RT_{43}	—	September 13, 1999	Višnjan Observatory	K. Korlević	THM	6.2 km	MPC · JPL
42849 Podjavorinská	1999 RK_{44}	Podjavorinská	September 15, 1999	Modra	A. Galád, P. Kolény	·	5.0 km	MPC · JPL
42850	1999 RS_{50}	—	September 7, 1999	Socorro	LINEAR	NYS	2.1 km	MPC · JPL
42851	1999 RA_{51}	—	September 7, 1999	Socorro	LINEAR	V	2.8 km	MPC · JPL
42852	1999 RX_{52}	—	September 7, 1999	Socorro	LINEAR	·	5.6 km	MPC · JPL
42853	1999 RP_{69}	—	September 7, 1999	Socorro	LINEAR	·	4.4 km	MPC · JPL
42854	1999 RV_{70}	—	September 7, 1999	Socorro	LINEAR	KOR	2.9 km	MPC · JPL
42855	1999 RF_{72}	—	September 7, 1999	Socorro	LINEAR	·	2.3 km	MPC · JPL
42856	1999 RO_{73}	—	September 7, 1999	Socorro	LINEAR	EUN	3.4 km	MPC · JPL
42857	1999 RS_{84}	—	September 7, 1999	Socorro	LINEAR	·	2.0 km	MPC · JPL
42858	1999 RL_{88}	—	September 7, 1999	Socorro	LINEAR	·	2.3 km	MPC · JPL
42859	1999 RB_{89}	—	September 7, 1999	Socorro	LINEAR	·	7.6 km	MPC · JPL
42860	1999 RC_{90}	—	September 7, 1999	Socorro	LINEAR	MIS	7.3 km	MPC · JPL
42861	1999 RQ_{90}	—	September 7, 1999	Socorro	LINEAR	(2076)	3.1 km	MPC · JPL
42862	1999 RH_{97}	—	September 7, 1999	Socorro	LINEAR	·	3.1 km	MPC · JPL
42863	1999 RD_{99}	—	September 7, 1999	Socorro	LINEAR	·	3.3 km	MPC · JPL
42864	1999 RY_{101}	—	September 8, 1999	Socorro	LINEAR	·	1.8 km	MPC · JPL
42865	1999 RR_{103}	—	September 8, 1999	Socorro	LINEAR	V	1.8 km	MPC · JPL
42866	1999 RJ_{104}	—	September 8, 1999	Socorro	LINEAR	V	2.7 km	MPC · JPL
42867	1999 RO_{113}	—	September 9, 1999	Socorro	LINEAR	·	4.8 km	MPC · JPL
42868	1999 RT_{115}	—	September 9, 1999	Socorro	LINEAR	·	4.5 km	MPC · JPL
42869	1999 RD_{117}	—	September 9, 1999	Socorro	LINEAR	·	3.1 km	MPC · JPL
42870	1999 RM_{120}	—	September 9, 1999	Socorro	LINEAR	PAD	6.6 km	MPC · JPL
42871	1999 RA_{123}	—	September 9, 1999	Socorro	LINEAR	·	1.9 km	MPC · JPL
42872	1999 RB_{124}	—	September 9, 1999	Socorro	LINEAR	·	3.0 km	MPC · JPL
42873	1999 RV_{127}	—	September 9, 1999	Socorro	LINEAR	V	1.6 km	MPC · JPL
42874	1999 RM_{128}	—	September 9, 1999	Socorro	LINEAR	V	2.8 km	MPC · JPL
42875	1999 RO_{128}	—	September 9, 1999	Socorro	LINEAR	·	3.1 km	MPC · JPL
42876	1999 RS_{132}	—	September 9, 1999	Socorro	LINEAR	V	1.7 km	MPC · JPL
42877	1999 RW_{133}	—	September 9, 1999	Socorro	LINEAR	·	2.9 km	MPC · JPL
42878	1999 RT_{135}	—	September 9, 1999	Socorro	LINEAR	·	2.3 km	MPC · JPL
42879	1999 RD_{136}	—	September 9, 1999	Socorro	LINEAR	·	1.5 km	MPC · JPL
42880	1999 RX_{138}	—	September 9, 1999	Socorro	LINEAR	(2076)	2.2 km	MPC · JPL
42881	1999 RD_{145}	—	September 9, 1999	Socorro	LINEAR	·	2.3 km	MPC · JPL
42882	1999 RZ_{145}	—	September 9, 1999	Socorro	LINEAR	·	2.3 km	MPC · JPL
42883	1999 RJ_{146}	—	September 9, 1999	Socorro	LINEAR	·	2.2 km	MPC · JPL
42884	1999 RF_{148}	—	September 9, 1999	Socorro	LINEAR	·	2.0 km	MPC · JPL
42885	1999 RZ_{148}	—	September 9, 1999	Socorro	LINEAR	·	3.7 km	MPC · JPL
42886	1999 RL_{150}	—	September 9, 1999	Socorro	LINEAR	·	2.1 km	MPC · JPL
42887	1999 RV_{155}	—	September 9, 1999	Socorro	LINEAR	·	3.6 km	MPC · JPL
42888	1999 RH_{163}	—	September 9, 1999	Socorro	LINEAR	·	5.4 km	MPC · JPL
42889	1999 RW_{164}	—	September 9, 1999	Socorro	LINEAR	V	2.2 km	MPC · JPL
42890	1999 RG_{167}	—	September 9, 1999	Socorro	LINEAR	·	3.8 km	MPC · JPL
42891	1999 RH_{169}	—	September 9, 1999	Socorro	LINEAR	·	2.4 km	MPC · JPL
42892	1999 RF_{180}	—	September 9, 1999	Socorro	LINEAR	EUN	7.8 km	MPC · JPL
42893	1999 RQ_{180}	—	September 9, 1999	Socorro	LINEAR	·	3.0 km	MPC · JPL
42894	1999 RM_{181}	—	September 9, 1999	Socorro	LINEAR	·	2.2 km	MPC · JPL
42895	1999 RK_{182}	—	September 9, 1999	Socorro	LINEAR	·	2.2 km	MPC · JPL
42896	1999 RX_{182}	—	September 9, 1999	Socorro	LINEAR	(5)	3.6 km	MPC · JPL
42897	1999 RZ_{187}	—	September 9, 1999	Socorro	LINEAR	·	1.8 km	MPC · JPL
42898	1999 RC_{190}	—	September 9, 1999	Socorro	LINEAR	·	2.7 km	MPC · JPL
42899	1999 RV_{193}	—	September 7, 1999	Socorro	LINEAR	·	7.5 km	MPC · JPL
42900	1999 RB_{195}	—	September 8, 1999	Socorro	LINEAR	·	2.7 km	MPC · JPL

== 42901–43000 ==
back to top

Designation			Discovery			Properties		Ref
Permanent	Provisional	Named after	Date	Site	Discoverer(s)	Category	Diam.	Ref
42901	1999 RN_{196}	—	September 8, 1999	Socorro	LINEAR	·	2.6 km	MPC · JPL
42902	1999 RM_{197}	—	September 8, 1999	Socorro	LINEAR	CYB	8.4 km	MPC · JPL
42903	1999 RL_{200}	—	September 8, 1999	Socorro	LINEAR	·	6.3 km	MPC · JPL
42904	1999 RV_{202}	—	September 8, 1999	Socorro	LINEAR	·	4.4 km	MPC · JPL
42905	1999 RC_{203}	—	September 8, 1999	Socorro	LINEAR	·	8.6 km	MPC · JPL
42906	1999 RK_{212}	—	September 8, 1999	Socorro	LINEAR	MAR	3.0 km	MPC · JPL
42907	1999 RN_{212}	—	September 8, 1999	Socorro	LINEAR	·	4.5 km	MPC · JPL
42908	1999 RL_{214}	—	September 5, 1999	Anderson Mesa	LONEOS	·	2.2 km	MPC · JPL
42909	1999 RH_{218}	—	September 4, 1999	Anderson Mesa	LONEOS	·	2.0 km	MPC · JPL
42910 Samanthalawler	1999 RB_{221}	Samanthalawler	September 5, 1999	Anderson Mesa	LONEOS	·	4.8 km	MPC · JPL
42911	1999 RJ_{221}	—	September 5, 1999	Anderson Mesa	LONEOS	·	2.2 km	MPC · JPL
42912	1999 RQ_{221}	—	September 5, 1999	Catalina	CSS	·	2.1 km	MPC · JPL
42913	1999 RW_{223}	—	September 7, 1999	Catalina	CSS	·	3.1 km	MPC · JPL
42914	1999 RA_{232}	—	September 9, 1999	Anderson Mesa	LONEOS	·	5.8 km	MPC · JPL
42915	1999 RD_{232}	—	September 9, 1999	Anderson Mesa	LONEOS	·	2.6 km	MPC · JPL
42916	1999 RH_{238}	—	September 8, 1999	Catalina	CSS	·	3.3 km	MPC · JPL
42917	1999 SU_{1}	—	September 21, 1999	Calgary	Billings, G. W.	·	10 km	MPC · JPL
42918	1999 SK_{4}	—	September 29, 1999	Višnjan Observatory	K. Korlević	·	2.3 km	MPC · JPL
42919	1999 SS_{4}	—	September 29, 1999	Višnjan Observatory	K. Korlević	·	2.4 km	MPC · JPL
42920	1999 SA_{8}	—	September 29, 1999	Socorro	LINEAR	·	4.2 km	MPC · JPL
42921	1999 SH_{8}	—	September 29, 1999	Socorro	LINEAR	·	3.7 km	MPC · JPL
42922	1999 SP_{8}	—	September 29, 1999	Socorro	LINEAR	GEF	6.4 km	MPC · JPL
42923	1999 SR_{18}	—	September 30, 1999	Socorro	LINEAR	·	3.8 km	MPC · JPL
42924 Betlem	1999 TJ_{2}	Betlem	October 2, 1999	Ondřejov	L. Kotková	·	2.2 km	MPC · JPL
42925	1999 TC_{6}	—	October 6, 1999	Farpoint	G. Bell, G. Hug	·	1.7 km	MPC · JPL
42926	1999 TJ_{7}	—	October 6, 1999	Višnjan Observatory	K. Korlević, M. Jurić	·	3.8 km	MPC · JPL
42927	1999 TP_{7}	—	October 7, 1999	Powell	Powell	PHO	2.8 km	MPC · JPL
42928	1999 TX_{7}	—	October 2, 1999	Socorro	LINEAR	PHO	2.2 km	MPC · JPL
42929 Francini	1999 TW_{9}	Francini	October 8, 1999	San Marcello	L. Tesi, G. Forti	NYS	3.1 km	MPC · JPL
42930	1999 TM_{11}	—	October 6, 1999	Siding Spring	R. H. McNaught	PHO	4.2 km	MPC · JPL
42931	1999 TG_{17}	—	October 15, 1999	Višnjan Observatory	K. Korlević	·	7.9 km	MPC · JPL
42932	1999 TF_{19}	—	October 12, 1999	Uccle	T. Pauwels	·	4.4 km	MPC · JPL
42933	1999 TR_{19}	—	October 15, 1999	Siding Spring	R. H. McNaught	·	6.5 km	MPC · JPL
42934	1999 TL_{25}	—	October 3, 1999	Socorro	LINEAR	·	2.2 km	MPC · JPL
42935	1999 TS_{26}	—	October 3, 1999	Socorro	LINEAR	NYS	1.6 km	MPC · JPL
42936	1999 TL_{27}	—	October 3, 1999	Socorro	LINEAR	KOR	3.8 km	MPC · JPL
42937	1999 TU_{28}	—	October 4, 1999	Socorro	LINEAR	·	4.3 km	MPC · JPL
42938	1999 TY_{30}	—	October 4, 1999	Socorro	LINEAR	·	5.4 km	MPC · JPL
42939	1999 TJ_{31}	—	October 4, 1999	Socorro	LINEAR	·	3.1 km	MPC · JPL
42940	1999 TP_{38}	—	October 1, 1999	Catalina	CSS	·	6.5 km	MPC · JPL
42941	1999 TX_{74}	—	October 10, 1999	Kitt Peak	Spacewatch	NYS	2.9 km	MPC · JPL
42942	1999 TK_{77}	—	October 10, 1999	Kitt Peak	Spacewatch	NYS	1.8 km	MPC · JPL
42943	1999 TH_{92}	—	October 2, 1999	Socorro	LINEAR	·	1.6 km	MPC · JPL
42944	1999 TQ_{93}	—	October 2, 1999	Socorro	LINEAR	NYS	2.1 km	MPC · JPL
42945	1999 TW_{94}	—	October 2, 1999	Socorro	LINEAR	·	3.1 km	MPC · JPL
42946	1999 TU_{95}	—	October 2, 1999	Socorro	LINEAR	·	4.7 km	MPC · JPL
42947	1999 TB_{98}	—	October 2, 1999	Socorro	LINEAR	V	2.0 km	MPC · JPL
42948	1999 TR_{98}	—	October 2, 1999	Socorro	LINEAR	·	2.8 km	MPC · JPL
42949	1999 TV_{100}	—	October 2, 1999	Socorro	LINEAR	·	2.2 km	MPC · JPL
42950	1999 TF_{101}	—	October 2, 1999	Socorro	LINEAR	·	2.5 km	MPC · JPL
42951	1999 TU_{101}	—	October 2, 1999	Socorro	LINEAR	·	2.2 km	MPC · JPL
42952	1999 TV_{102}	—	October 2, 1999	Socorro	LINEAR	·	4.7 km	MPC · JPL
42953	1999 TK_{109}	—	October 4, 1999	Socorro	LINEAR	·	3.5 km	MPC · JPL
42954	1999 TK_{118}	—	October 4, 1999	Socorro	LINEAR	·	1.9 km	MPC · JPL
42955	1999 TK_{121}	—	October 4, 1999	Socorro	LINEAR	·	2.3 km	MPC · JPL
42956	1999 TH_{122}	—	October 4, 1999	Socorro	LINEAR	·	1.7 km	MPC · JPL
42957	1999 TK_{122}	—	October 4, 1999	Socorro	LINEAR	·	5.1 km	MPC · JPL
42958	1999 TB_{127}	—	October 4, 1999	Socorro	LINEAR	·	1.3 km	MPC · JPL
42959	1999 TC_{136}	—	October 6, 1999	Socorro	LINEAR	·	2.8 km	MPC · JPL
42960	1999 TJ_{139}	—	October 6, 1999	Socorro	LINEAR	·	1.6 km	MPC · JPL
42961	1999 TD_{140}	—	October 6, 1999	Socorro	LINEAR	·	2.2 km	MPC · JPL
42962	1999 TQ_{140}	—	October 6, 1999	Socorro	LINEAR	NYS	2.2 km	MPC · JPL
42963	1999 TH_{144}	—	October 7, 1999	Socorro	LINEAR	EUN	4.7 km	MPC · JPL
42964	1999 TD_{147}	—	October 7, 1999	Socorro	LINEAR	·	2.6 km	MPC · JPL
42965	1999 TH_{151}	—	October 7, 1999	Socorro	LINEAR	·	4.7 km	MPC · JPL
42966	1999 TR_{151}	—	October 7, 1999	Socorro	LINEAR	AGN	2.8 km	MPC · JPL
42967	1999 TR_{164}	—	October 10, 1999	Socorro	LINEAR	·	2.6 km	MPC · JPL
42968	1999 TT_{165}	—	October 10, 1999	Socorro	LINEAR	·	3.1 km	MPC · JPL
42969	1999 TD_{173}	—	October 10, 1999	Socorro	LINEAR	·	2.8 km	MPC · JPL
42970	1999 TD_{174}	—	October 10, 1999	Socorro	LINEAR	·	2.8 km	MPC · JPL
42971	1999 TW_{180}	—	October 10, 1999	Socorro	LINEAR	·	2.9 km	MPC · JPL
42972	1999 TA_{181}	—	October 10, 1999	Socorro	LINEAR	MAR	3.0 km	MPC · JPL
42973	1999 TU_{184}	—	October 12, 1999	Socorro	LINEAR	·	6.3 km	MPC · JPL
42974	1999 TX_{186}	—	October 12, 1999	Socorro	LINEAR	·	3.9 km	MPC · JPL
42975	1999 TW_{196}	—	October 12, 1999	Socorro	LINEAR	·	3.9 km	MPC · JPL
42976	1999 TL_{211}	—	October 15, 1999	Socorro	LINEAR	·	2.6 km	MPC · JPL
42977	1999 TH_{216}	—	October 15, 1999	Socorro	LINEAR	NYS	1.8 km	MPC · JPL
42978	1999 TL_{219}	—	October 1, 1999	Catalina	CSS	·	3.1 km	MPC · JPL
42979	1999 TR_{220}	—	October 1, 1999	Catalina	CSS	·	2.0 km	MPC · JPL
42980	1999 TM_{224}	—	October 1, 1999	Catalina	CSS	·	3.5 km	MPC · JPL
42981 Jenniskens	1999 TY_{224}	Jenniskens	October 2, 1999	Ondřejov	Ondrejov	·	2.6 km	MPC · JPL
42982	1999 TC_{227}	—	October 5, 1999	Anderson Mesa	LONEOS	·	3.2 km	MPC · JPL
42983	1999 TJ_{228}	—	October 2, 1999	Anderson Mesa	LONEOS	·	3.5 km	MPC · JPL
42984	1999 TU_{228}	—	October 2, 1999	Catalina	CSS	·	2.7 km	MPC · JPL
42985 Marsset	1999 TR_{230}	Marsset	October 4, 1999	Anderson Mesa	LONEOS	LIX	11 km	MPC · JPL
42986	1999 TP_{231}	—	October 5, 1999	Catalina	CSS	ADE	3.9 km	MPC · JPL
42987	1999 TB_{242}	—	October 4, 1999	Catalina	CSS	EUN · slow	4.2 km	MPC · JPL
42988	1999 TK_{242}	—	October 4, 1999	Catalina	CSS	·	9.8 km	MPC · JPL
42989	1999 TO_{245}	—	October 7, 1999	Catalina	CSS	·	4.6 km	MPC · JPL
42990	1999 TM_{251}	—	October 9, 1999	Socorro	LINEAR	·	2.7 km	MPC · JPL
42991	1999 TY_{251}	—	October 8, 1999	Socorro	LINEAR	·	1.8 km	MPC · JPL
42992	1999 TH_{260}	—	October 10, 1999	Socorro	LINEAR	·	2.1 km	MPC · JPL
42993	1999 TP_{270}	—	October 3, 1999	Socorro	LINEAR	·	9.4 km	MPC · JPL
42994	1999 TY_{273}	—	October 5, 1999	Socorro	LINEAR	·	7.5 km	MPC · JPL
42995	1999 TR_{284}	—	October 9, 1999	Socorro	LINEAR	·	3.8 km	MPC · JPL
42996	1999 TB_{291}	—	October 10, 1999	Socorro	LINEAR	EUN	4.3 km	MPC · JPL
42997	1999 UM_{1}	—	October 18, 1999	Kleť	Kleť	·	2.8 km	MPC · JPL
42998 Malinafrank	1999 UV_{1}	Malinafrank	October 17, 1999	Ondřejov	P. Pravec, P. Kušnirák	RAF	5.9 km	MPC · JPL
42999	1999 UQ_{2}	—	October 18, 1999	Ondřejov	P. Pravec	·	4.7 km	MPC · JPL
43000	1999 UL_{8}	—	October 29, 1999	Catalina	CSS	·	3.6 km	MPC · JPL

back to top

== See also ==
- Meanings of minor-planet names: 42001–43000
