= Meanings of minor-planet names: 42001–43000 =

As minor planet discoveries are confirmed, they are given a permanent number by the IAU's Minor Planet Center (MPC), and the discoverers can then submit names for them, following the IAU's naming conventions. The list below concerns those minor planets in the specified number-range that have received names, and explains the meanings of those names.

Official naming citations of newly named small Solar System bodies are approved and published in a bulletin by IAU's Working Group for Small Bodies Nomenclature (WGSBN). Before May 2021, citations were published in MPC's Minor Planet Circulars for many decades. Recent citations can also be found on the JPL Small-Body Database (SBDB). Until his death in 2016, German astronomer Lutz D. Schmadel compiled these citations into the Dictionary of Minor Planet Names (DMP) and regularly updated the collection.

Based on Paul Herget's The Names of the Minor Planets, Schmadel also researched the unclear origin of numerous asteroids, most of which had been named prior to World War II. This article incorporates text from this source, which is in the public domain: SBDB New namings may only be added to this list below after official publication as the preannouncement of names is condemned. The WGSBN publishes a comprehensive guideline for the naming rules of non-cometary small Solar System bodies.

== 42001–42100 ==
Named minor planet	Provisional	This minor planet was named for...	Ref; Catalog
42073 Noreen	2001 AS_{1}	Noreen Pray, wife of American discoverer Donald P. Pray	JPL · 42073

== 42101–42200 ==
back to top

Named minor planet	Provisional	This minor planet was named for...	Ref; Catalog
42112 Hongkyumoon	2001 AF_{48}	Hong-Kyu Moon (born 1965) is a planetary scientist at the Korea Astronomy and Space Science Institute (Daejeon, South Korea). He studies survey simulations for near-Earth objects and is P.I. of the DEEP-South observation project for asteroids and comets in the southern sky.	IAU · 42112
42113 Jura	2001 AB_{49}	Canton of Jura, the 23rd state of Switzerland	JPL · 42113
42168 Enispe	2001 CT_{13}	Enispe was a town of Arcadia mentioned in the Catalogue of Ships in Homer’s Iliad.	IAU · 42168
42175 Yuyang	2001 CR_{21}	Yang Yu (born 1986) is a professor at Beihang University who studies orbits around irregularly shaped small bodies and has worked on understanding the shape evolution of asteroids.	IAU · 42175
42177 Bolin	2001 CL_{22}	Bryce T. Bolin (born 1986) is a postdoctoral researcher at the California Institute of Technology (Pasadena, California, United States of America) whose observational and numerical studies focus on mini-moons, asteroid families, active asteroids, near-Earth objects, and interstellar objects.	IAU · 42177
42183 Tubiana	2001 CY_{29}	Cecilia Tubiana (born 1980) is a researcher at the Max Planck Institute for Solar System Research (Göttingen, Germany) who studies the nuclei and dust of comets. She played a core role in the operation of the OSIRIS cameras on the Rosetta mission and is now the payload coordinator for Comet Interceptor.	IAU · 42183
42191 Thurmann	2001 CJ_{37}	Jules Thurmann (1804–1855), French-Swiss geologist and botanist	JPL · 42191

== 42201–42300 ==
back to top

Named minor planet	Provisional	This minor planet was named for...	Ref; Catalog
42246 Bobanderson	2001 FX_{121}	Bob Anderson, talented American programmer who developed software widely used by asteroid occultation observers worldwide (Occular, ROTE, PyMovie, PyOTE, GoPyOTE and IOTAdiffraction).	IAU · 42246
42271 Keikokubota	2001 QL_{154}	Keiko Kubota (born 1985) is a Japanese vocalist and original member of the musical group "Kalafina". She has also performed with "FictionJunction".	JPL · 42271
42295 Teresateng	2001 UG_{17}	Teresa Teng, Taiwanese popular and influential pop singer	JPL · 42295

== 42301–42400 ==
back to top

Named minor planet	Provisional	This minor planet was named for...	Ref; Catalog
42354 Kindleberger	2002 CK_{43}	Charles P. Kindleberger, American economist	JPL · 42354
42355 Typhon	2002 CR_{46}	Typhon, the mythological enemy of the Olympian gods, leader of the Titans, and its mother, Echidna ((42355) Typhon I Echidna)	JPL · 42355
42365 Caligiuri	2002 CM_{115}	Michael P. Caligiuri, American neurologist and amateur astro-imager	JPL · 42365
42377 KLENOT	2002 EU_{2}	KLENOT (initialism of Klet Observatory near Earth and other unusual objects observations team and telescope), a project conducted at the Kleť Observatory in the Czech Republic	MPC · 42377

== 42401–42500 ==
back to top

Named minor planet	Provisional	This minor planet was named for...	Ref; Catalog
42403 Andraimon	6844 P-L	Andraimon, father of the Greek Trojan War hero Thoas	JPL · 42403
42478 Inozemtseva	1981 RX_{1}	Galina Alexeevna Inozemtseva, the head of Municipal Children's Diagnostic Center in Rostov-on-Don, Russia	JPL · 42478
42479 Tolik	1981 SE_{7}	Anatolij (Tolik) Leonidovich Zhuravlev, Ukrainian computer expert and engineer, husband of Russian discoverer Lyudmila Zhuravleva	JPL · 42479
42482 Fischer-Dieskau	1988 RT_{3}	Dietrich Fischer-Dieskau, German baritone, lieder, and oratorio singer, orchestra conductor, and author	JPL · 42482
42485 Stendhal	1991 BC_{1}	Stendhal (Marie-Henri Beyle, 1783–1842), an original and complex French writer of the first half of the 19th century. Well known for his masterpieces Le Rouge et le Noir (1830) and La Chartreuse de Parme (1839).	JPL · 42485
42487 Ångström	1991 RY_{2}	Anders Jonas Ångström, 19th-century Swedish physicist, cofounder of astrospectroscopy	JPL · 42487
42492 Brüggenthies	1991 TD_{7}	Wilhelm Brüggenthies, a former civil engineer.	JPL · 42492

== 42501–42600 ==
back to top

Named minor planet	Provisional	This minor planet was named for...	Ref; Catalog
42516 Oistrach	1993 VH_{5}	David Oistrakh (1908–1974), and his son Igor Oistrakh, Jewish-Russian-Ukrainian violin virtuosi	JPL · 42516
42522 Chuckberry	1994 CB_{17}	Chuck Berry (Charles Edward Anderson, 1926–2017) was an American guitarist, singer and songwriter. He was one of the pioneers of rock and roll.	JPL · 42522
42523 Ragazzileonardo	1994 ES	I Ragazzi della Leonardo ("Leonardo's Children"), Italian cultural association	JPL · 42523
42527 Mizutanimasanori	1994 TO_{2}	Masanori Mizutani, Japanese amateur astronomer.	IAU · 42527
42531 McKenna	1995 LJ	Martin McKenna (born 1978), Irish astronomer. In 2005, he was named "Astronomer of the Year" by the Irish Federation of Astronomical Societies.	JPL · 42531
42566 Ryutaro	1996 XQ_{25}	Ryutaro Hirota (1892–1952), a renowned Japanese composer, was born in Aki city, Kochi prefecture and studied musical composition at Tokyo Music School.	JPL · 42566
42585 Pheidippides	1997 FJ_{1}	Pheidippides (fl. 490 B.C.E.) was a legendary Athenian herald who ran 240 km between the battlefield at Marathon to Athens in two days to report the Greek victory over the Persians. The modern marathon takes its name from this legend.	JPL · 42585
42593 Antoniazzi	1997 JQ	Antonio Maria Antoniazzi (1872–1925), an Italian astronomer.	JPL · 42593

== 42601–42700 ==
back to top

Named minor planet	Provisional	This minor planet was named for...	Ref; Catalog
42609 Daubechies	1998 DB_{34}	Ingrid Daubechies (born 1954), a Belgian physicist and mathematician.	JPL · 42609
42611 Manchu	1998 EU_{1}	Manchu (b. 1956, real name Philippe Bouchet), a French space artist.	IAU · 42611
42613 Schaller	1998 EC_{4}	Christian Schaller (b. 1969), an American software developer for space-based imagers.	IAU · 42613
42614 Ubaldina	1998 EY_{6}	Ubaldina Caronia, mother of Italian co-discoverer Alfredo Caronia	JPL · 42614
42618 Bardabelias	1998 FM_{8}	Nicole M. Bardabelias (b. 1992), a science operations engineer on the High Resolution Imaging Science Experiment (HiRISE) on the Mars Reconnaissance Orbiter and formerly for Mars Exploration Rovers	IAU · 42618
42665 Kristinblock	1998 HF_{4}	Kristin Block (b. 1978), American scientist and musician.	IAU · 42665
42697 Lucapaolini	1998 LP_{2}	Luca Paolini (born 1977), one of the best Italian bicycle racers.	JPL · 42697

== 42701–42800 ==
back to top

Named minor planet	Provisional	This minor planet was named for...	Ref; Catalog
42733 Andrébaranne	1998 RH_{2}	André Baranne (1931–2021), a French astronomer.	IAU · 42733
42747 Fuser	1998 SU_{10}	Ireneo Fuser, Italian author and professor of organ, piano, and composition	JPL · 42747
42748 Andrisani	1998 SV_{10}	Donato Andrisani, Italian dental surgeon, amateur astronomer, and friend of Italian discoverer Vittorio Goretti	JPL · 42748
42772 Kokotanekova	1998 TJ_{34}	Rosita Kokotanekova (born 1991) is a Research Fellow at ESO in Garching, Germany. She studies surface characteristics of comets, trans-Neptunian objects, and other small solar system bodies using ground-based photometry.	IAU · 42772
42775 Bianchini	1998 UO_{23}	Francesco Bianchini, 17th–18th century Italian catholic priest, calendar reformer and astronomer	JPL · 42775
42776 Casablanca	1998 UV_{26}	Casablanca, Morocco, and Casablanca (1942), one of the most renowned movies of all time	JPL · 42776
42795 Derekmuller	1999 CO_{12}	Derek Muller (b. 1982), a Canadian-Australian science communicator.	IAU · 42795

== 42801–42900 ==
back to top

Named minor planet	Provisional	This minor planet was named for...	Ref; Catalog
42837 Waltrobinson	1999 PR_{1}	Walter Robinson, American amateur astronomer.	IAU · 42837
42849 Podjavorinská	1999 RK_{44}	Ľudmila Podjavorinská (Riznerová), Slovak poet and writer, recipient of a National artist award for her contributions to Slovak literature	JPL · 42849

== 42901–43000 ==
back to top

Named minor planet	Provisional	This minor planet was named for...	Ref; Catalog
42910 Samanthalawler	1999 RB_{221}	Samantha Lawler (born 1982) is an assistant professor at the University of Regina (Canada) who observationally studies small body populations around the Sun and exoplanetary systems.	IAU · 42910
42924 Betlem	1999 TJ_{2}	Hans Betlem (born 1954), Dutch amateur meteor astronomer and founder of the Dutch Meteor Society	JPL · 42924
42929 Francini	1999 TW_{9}	Claudio Francini (born 1926), Italian amateur astronomer at the discovering San Marcello Observatory	JPL · 42929
42981 Jenniskens	1999 TY_{224}	Peter Jenniskens (born 1962), American meteor astronomer	JPL · 42981
42985 Marsset	1999 TR_{230}	Michael Marsset (born 1989) is a postdoctoral associate at MIT (Cambridge, MA). An expert in small solar system bodies, his research includes adaptive optics imaging, photometric colors, and spectroscopic measurements of asteroids and Trans-Neptunian Objects.	IAU · 42985
42998 Malinafrank	1999 UV_{1}	Frank Joseph Malina Jr (1912–1981), American aeronautical engineer and painter	JPL · 42998

back to top

Preceded by 41,001–42,000	Meanings of minor-planet names List of minor planets: 42,001–43,000	Succeeded by 43,001–44,000
