= Vittorio Goretti =

Italian astronomer

Minor planets discovered: 32
see § List of discovered minor planets

Vittorio Goretti (born 1939 – 7 July 2016) was an Italian astronomer and a discoverer of minor planets at his observatory OBS610 in Pianoro, on the outskirts of Bologna, Italy.

Vittorio Goretti is a retired teacher of physics and mathematics at secondary school level in Bologna. He has discovered 32 main-belt asteroids, all of them assigned permanent numbers. He is a member of the Cortina Astronomical Association (Associazione Astronomica Cortina) and is also a collaborator with the Minor Planet Center (MPC) at the Smithsonian Astrophysical Observatory monitoring near-Earth Asteroids brighter than magnitude 18.0 V under the auspices of Division III of the International Astronomical Union at his own Pianoro Observatory (MPC Observatory 610).

The main-belt asteroid 7801 Goretti has been named in his honour. The official naming citation was published on 16 October 1997 (M.P.C. 30803).

== List of discovered minor planets ==
| 7437 Torricelli | 12 March 1994 | list^{[A]} |
| 8885 Sette | 13 March 1994 | list^{[B]} |
| 9232 Miretti | 31 January 1997 | list |
| 10197 Senigalliesi | 18 October 1996 | list |
| 10200 Quadri | 7 July 1997 | list |
| 11121 Malpighi | 10 September 1996 | list |
| 12035 Ruggieri | 1 February 1997 | list |
| 15381 Spadolini | 1 September 1997 | list |
| 16761 Hertz | 3 October 1996 | list |
| 16766 Righi | 18 October 1996 | list |
| 17652 Nepoti | 3 November 1996 | list |
| 20081 Occhialini | 12 March 1994 | list^{[B]} |

| 21306 Marani | 1 December 1996 | list |
| (24996) 1998 OD_{1} | 20 July 1998 | list^{[C]} |
| 25276 Dimai | 15 November 1998 | list |
| 26917 Pianoro | 15 September 1996 | list |
| 29457 Marcopolo | 25 September 1997 | list |
| 33376 Medi | 6 February 1999 | list |
| 39699 Ernestocorte | 12 October 1996 | list |
| 42747 Fuser | 21 September 1998 | list |
| 42748 Andrisani | 21 September 1998 | list |
| 43999 Gramigna | 31 August 1997 | list |
| 44005 Migliardi | 25 September 1997 | list |
| 47038 Majoni | 17 November 1998 | list |

| 48737 Cusinato | 8 March 1997 | list |
| 58573 Serpieri | 9 September 1997 | list |
| 70745 Aleserpieri | 9 November 1999 | list |
| 79375 Valetti | 16 March 1997 | list |
| 79826 Finardi | 17 November 1998 | list |
| 96217 Gronchi | 14 September 1993 | list^{[A]} |
| 100553 Dariofo | 2 April 1997 | list |
| (382412) 1997 SZ_{3} | 25 September 1997 | list |
Co-discovery made with:^{A} A. Boattini^{B} M. Tombelli^{C} L. Tesi
