= List of minor planets: 710001–711000 =

The following is a partial list of minor planets, running from minor-planet number 710001 through 711000, inclusive. The primary data for this and other partial lists is based on JPL's "Small-Body Orbital Elements" and data available from the Minor Planet Center. Critical list information is also provided by the MPC, unless otherwise specified from Lowell Observatory. A detailed description of the table's columns and additional sources are given on the main page including a complete list of every page in this series, and a statistical break-up on the dynamical classification of minor planets.

Also see the summary list of all named bodies in numerical and alphabetical order, and the corresponding naming citations for the number range of this particular list. New namings may only be added to this list after official publication, as the preannouncement of names is condemned by the Working Group for Small Bodies Nomenclature of the International Astronomical Union.

Near-Earth obj.	MBA (inner)	MBA (outer)	Centaur
Mars-crosser	MBA (middle)	Jupiter trojan	Trans-Neptunian obj.
Unclassified

== 710001–710100 ==
Designation			Discovery			Properties		Ref
Permanent	Provisional	Named after	Date	Site	Discoverer(s)	Category	Diam.	Ref
710001	2013 LS_{37}	—	June 7, 2013	Mount Lemmon	Mount Lemmon Survey	·	2.7 km	MPC · JPL
710002	2013 LW_{38}	—	August 28, 2014	Haleakala	Pan-STARRS 1	·	1.7 km	MPC · JPL
710003	2013 LC_{39}	—	August 30, 2014	Mount Lemmon	Mount Lemmon Survey	EOS	1.5 km	MPC · JPL
710004	2013 LW_{39}	—	June 3, 2013	Tincana	Zolnowski, M., Kusiak, M.	·	2.2 km	MPC · JPL
710005	2013 LX_{39}	—	June 8, 2013	Mount Lemmon	Mount Lemmon Survey	·	1.6 km	MPC · JPL
710006	2013 LY_{40}	—	June 4, 2013	Mount Lemmon	Mount Lemmon Survey	·	1.6 km	MPC · JPL
710007	2013 LB_{41}	—	June 7, 2013	Haleakala	Pan-STARRS 1	EOS	1.2 km	MPC · JPL
710008	2013 LN_{42}	—	June 4, 2013	Mount Lemmon	Mount Lemmon Survey	·	2.3 km	MPC · JPL
710009	2013 LP_{42}	—	June 4, 2013	Haleakala	Pan-STARRS 1	(43176)	2.4 km	MPC · JPL
710010	2013 LG_{47}	—	March 19, 2018	Haleakala	Pan-STARRS 1	·	2.0 km	MPC · JPL
710011	2013 MR_{4}	—	June 19, 2013	Elena Remote	Oreshko, A.	·	710 m	MPC · JPL
710012	2013 MN_{5}	—	April 16, 2013	Haleakala	Pan-STARRS 1	·	840 m	MPC · JPL
710013	2013 MX_{8}	—	June 30, 2013	Haleakala	Pan-STARRS 1	H	550 m	MPC · JPL
710014	2013 MC_{9}	—	June 30, 2013	Haleakala	Pan-STARRS 1	·	3.3 km	MPC · JPL
710015	2013 MY_{9}	—	March 1, 2009	Kitt Peak	Spacewatch	·	580 m	MPC · JPL
710016	2013 MN_{10}	—	June 20, 2013	Haleakala	Pan-STARRS 1	·	2.7 km	MPC · JPL
710017	2013 MQ_{10}	—	June 30, 2013	Haleakala	Pan-STARRS 1	·	560 m	MPC · JPL
710018	2013 MF_{11}	—	February 5, 2011	Haleakala	Pan-STARRS 1	·	2.4 km	MPC · JPL
710019	2013 MO_{11}	—	June 30, 2013	Haleakala	Pan-STARRS 1	·	570 m	MPC · JPL
710020	2013 MK_{14}	—	June 19, 2013	Haleakala	Pan-STARRS 1	H	460 m	MPC · JPL
710021	2013 MT_{16}	—	June 18, 2013	Haleakala	Pan-STARRS 1	·	2.2 km	MPC · JPL
710022	2013 MN_{17}	—	December 13, 2015	Haleakala	Pan-STARRS 1	EMA	2.1 km	MPC · JPL
710023	2013 MG_{18}	—	June 20, 2013	Haleakala	Pan-STARRS 1	·	2.3 km	MPC · JPL
710024	2013 MD_{19}	—	June 18, 2013	Haleakala	Pan-STARRS 1	·	2.2 km	MPC · JPL
710025	2013 MM_{19}	—	June 18, 2013	Haleakala	Pan-STARRS 1	·	1.1 km	MPC · JPL
710026	2013 MA_{21}	—	June 30, 2013	Haleakala	Pan-STARRS 1	PHO	810 m	MPC · JPL
710027	2013 MX_{21}	—	June 20, 2013	Haleakala	Pan-STARRS 1	·	860 m	MPC · JPL
710028	2013 MA_{26}	—	June 18, 2013	Haleakala	Pan-STARRS 1	·	2.3 km	MPC · JPL
710029	2013 NC	—	May 2, 2013	Haleakala	Pan-STARRS 1	·	3.1 km	MPC · JPL
710030	2013 NT_{2}	—	July 1, 2013	Haleakala	Pan-STARRS 1	·	2.4 km	MPC · JPL
710031	2013 ND_{5}	—	July 1, 2013	Haleakala	Pan-STARRS 1	·	2.0 km	MPC · JPL
710032	2013 NR_{5}	—	July 1, 2013	Haleakala	Pan-STARRS 1	·	2.6 km	MPC · JPL
710033	2013 NX_{5}	—	July 1, 2013	Haleakala	Pan-STARRS 1	·	1.9 km	MPC · JPL
710034	2013 NB_{9}	—	January 3, 2011	Mount Lemmon	Mount Lemmon Survey	·	2.7 km	MPC · JPL
710035	2013 NH_{9}	—	July 6, 2013	Haleakala	Pan-STARRS 1	·	2.3 km	MPC · JPL
710036	2013 NN_{11}	—	June 18, 2013	Haleakala	Pan-STARRS 1	H	470 m	MPC · JPL
710037	2013 NQ_{12}	—	June 5, 2013	Oukaïmeden	M. Ory	·	2.8 km	MPC · JPL
710038	2013 NM_{13}	—	December 26, 2009	Kitt Peak	Spacewatch	·	2.5 km	MPC · JPL
710039	2013 NW_{13}	—	April 27, 2009	Kitt Peak	Spacewatch	·	1.0 km	MPC · JPL
710040	2013 NY_{17}	—	July 13, 2013	Mount Lemmon	Mount Lemmon Survey	·	1.9 km	MPC · JPL
710041	2013 NK_{19}	—	February 7, 2011	Mount Lemmon	Mount Lemmon Survey	EOS	1.5 km	MPC · JPL
710042	2013 NE_{21}	—	July 13, 2013	Haleakala	Pan-STARRS 1	·	2.2 km	MPC · JPL
710043	2013 NC_{23}	—	July 4, 2013	Haleakala	Pan-STARRS 1	·	750 m	MPC · JPL
710044	2013 NM_{23}	—	July 15, 2013	Haleakala	Pan-STARRS 1	·	2.3 km	MPC · JPL
710045	2013 NG_{24}	—	July 12, 2013	Kislovodsk	Nevski, V.	PHO	1.2 km	MPC · JPL
710046	2013 NS_{25}	—	February 27, 2012	Haleakala	Pan-STARRS 1	·	2.3 km	MPC · JPL
710047	2013 NW_{25}	—	September 6, 2008	Kitt Peak	Spacewatch	THM	1.9 km	MPC · JPL
710048	2013 NP_{27}	—	July 14, 2013	Haleakala	Pan-STARRS 1	KOR	1.0 km	MPC · JPL
710049	2013 NA_{28}	—	September 5, 2008	Kitt Peak	Spacewatch	·	2.0 km	MPC · JPL
710050	2013 NU_{28}	—	February 11, 2011	Mount Lemmon	Mount Lemmon Survey	·	2.2 km	MPC · JPL
710051	2013 ND_{29}	—	February 7, 2011	Mount Lemmon	Mount Lemmon Survey	·	2.4 km	MPC · JPL
710052	2013 NN_{29}	—	July 14, 2013	Haleakala	Pan-STARRS 1	·	2.5 km	MPC · JPL
710053	2013 NN_{32}	—	January 30, 2011	Haleakala	Pan-STARRS 1	·	2.7 km	MPC · JPL
710054	2013 NZ_{32}	—	July 15, 2013	Haleakala	Pan-STARRS 1	·	2.4 km	MPC · JPL
710055	2013 NC_{33}	—	July 4, 2013	Haleakala	Pan-STARRS 1	·	3.6 km	MPC · JPL
710056	2013 NE_{33}	—	February 6, 2006	Kitt Peak	Spacewatch	·	3.3 km	MPC · JPL
710057	2013 NH_{33}	—	July 15, 2013	Haleakala	Pan-STARRS 1	·	3.1 km	MPC · JPL
710058	2013 NW_{33}	—	July 14, 2013	Haleakala	Pan-STARRS 1	·	2.8 km	MPC · JPL
710059	2013 NA_{34}	—	July 14, 2013	Haleakala	Pan-STARRS 1	(43176)	2.5 km	MPC · JPL
710060	2013 NS_{35}	—	July 14, 2013	Haleakala	Pan-STARRS 1	MAS	470 m	MPC · JPL
710061	2013 NU_{35}	—	November 29, 2014	Mount Lemmon	Mount Lemmon Survey	H	450 m	MPC · JPL
710062	2013 NA_{37}	—	July 15, 2013	Haleakala	Pan-STARRS 1	·	2.3 km	MPC · JPL
710063	2013 NX_{39}	—	August 6, 2014	Haleakala	Pan-STARRS 1	EOS	1.5 km	MPC · JPL
710064	2013 NJ_{40}	—	November 20, 2014	Mount Lemmon	Mount Lemmon Survey	·	920 m	MPC · JPL
710065	2013 NU_{40}	—	October 4, 2008	Catalina	CSS	·	2.3 km	MPC · JPL
710066	2013 NA_{41}	—	October 28, 1997	Mauna Kea	Veillet, C.	·	2.3 km	MPC · JPL
710067	2013 NB_{45}	—	November 27, 2014	Mount Lemmon	Mount Lemmon Survey	·	2.8 km	MPC · JPL
710068	2013 NT_{47}	—	July 12, 2013	Haleakala	Pan-STARRS 1	·	2.1 km	MPC · JPL
710069	2013 NB_{49}	—	July 13, 2013	Mount Lemmon	Mount Lemmon Survey	·	2.5 km	MPC · JPL
710070	2013 NA_{50}	—	July 12, 2013	Haleakala	Pan-STARRS 1	·	1.9 km	MPC · JPL
710071	2013 NE_{50}	—	July 15, 2013	Haleakala	Pan-STARRS 1	·	2.0 km	MPC · JPL
710072	2013 NG_{50}	—	July 1, 2013	Haleakala	Pan-STARRS 1	·	2.6 km	MPC · JPL
710073	2013 NA_{52}	—	July 12, 2013	Haleakala	Pan-STARRS 1	·	600 m	MPC · JPL
710074	2013 NS_{53}	—	July 14, 2013	Haleakala	Pan-STARRS 1	·	2.2 km	MPC · JPL
710075	2013 NQ_{55}	—	July 13, 2013	Haleakala	Pan-STARRS 1	·	1.4 km	MPC · JPL
710076	2013 NS_{55}	—	July 13, 2013	Mount Lemmon	Mount Lemmon Survey	·	1.4 km	MPC · JPL
710077	2013 NS_{56}	—	July 13, 2013	Haleakala	Pan-STARRS 1	·	2.3 km	MPC · JPL
710078	2013 NP_{57}	—	July 13, 2013	Haleakala	Pan-STARRS 1	·	1.9 km	MPC · JPL
710079	2013 NX_{57}	—	July 9, 2013	Haleakala	Pan-STARRS 1	·	2.4 km	MPC · JPL
710080	2013 NJ_{60}	—	July 13, 2013	Haleakala	Pan-STARRS 1	·	2.0 km	MPC · JPL
710081	2013 NQ_{61}	—	July 6, 2013	Haleakala	Pan-STARRS 1	EUN	1.1 km	MPC · JPL
710082	2013 NR_{62}	—	July 14, 2013	Haleakala	Pan-STARRS 1	·	2.2 km	MPC · JPL
710083	2013 NT_{63}	—	July 8, 2013	Charleston	R. Holmes	EOS	1.4 km	MPC · JPL
710084	2013 NQ_{67}	—	July 14, 2013	Haleakala	Pan-STARRS 1	·	1.1 km	MPC · JPL
710085	2013 NQ_{75}	—	July 13, 2013	Haleakala	Pan-STARRS 1	·	2.1 km	MPC · JPL
710086	2013 NM_{79}	—	July 4, 2013	Haleakala	Pan-STARRS 1	·	1.2 km	MPC · JPL
710087	2013 OR_{1}	—	July 17, 2013	Haleakala	Pan-STARRS 1	·	2.6 km	MPC · JPL
710088	2013 OD_{2}	—	September 6, 2008	Mount Lemmon	Mount Lemmon Survey	EUP	2.8 km	MPC · JPL
710089	2013 OV_{5}	—	June 17, 2013	Haleakala	Pan-STARRS 1	EOS	1.4 km	MPC · JPL
710090	2013 OU_{6}	—	July 28, 2013	Haleakala	Pan-STARRS 1	URS	3.2 km	MPC · JPL
710091	2013 OJ_{9}	—	September 25, 2008	Mount Lemmon	Mount Lemmon Survey	·	2.9 km	MPC · JPL
710092	2013 OS_{9}	—	June 30, 2002	Palomar	NEAT	·	3.0 km	MPC · JPL
710093	2013 OA_{12}	—	April 18, 2007	Kitt Peak	Spacewatch	·	1.8 km	MPC · JPL
710094	2013 OX_{13}	—	July 16, 2013	Haleakala	Pan-STARRS 1	·	2.5 km	MPC · JPL
710095	2013 OH_{14}	—	June 1, 2006	Mount Lemmon	Mount Lemmon Survey	·	2.8 km	MPC · JPL
710096	2013 OR_{15}	—	January 3, 2017	Haleakala	Pan-STARRS 1	·	2.7 km	MPC · JPL
710097	2013 OX_{15}	—	July 18, 2013	Haleakala	Pan-STARRS 1	EOS	1.5 km	MPC · JPL
710098	2013 OD_{19}	—	July 28, 2013	Haleakala	Pan-STARRS 1	VER	2.1 km	MPC · JPL
710099	2013 PN	—	August 2, 2013	Haleakala	Pan-STARRS 1	·	2.5 km	MPC · JPL
710100	2013 PP	—	July 28, 2013	Haleakala	Pan-STARRS 1	EOS	1.6 km	MPC · JPL

== 710101–710200 ==
back to top

Designation			Discovery			Properties		Ref
Permanent	Provisional	Named after	Date	Site	Discoverer(s)	Category	Diam.	Ref
710101	2013 PU	—	August 2, 2013	Haleakala	Pan-STARRS 1	·	1.6 km	MPC · JPL
710102	2013 PP_{1}	—	October 9, 2008	Mount Lemmon	Mount Lemmon Survey	VER	1.9 km	MPC · JPL
710103	2013 PU_{1}	—	August 2, 2013	Haleakala	Pan-STARRS 1	·	2.9 km	MPC · JPL
710104	2013 PF_{5}	—	August 2, 2013	Haleakala	Pan-STARRS 1	·	3.6 km	MPC · JPL
710105	2013 PL_{5}	—	August 2, 2013	Haleakala	Pan-STARRS 1	·	2.5 km	MPC · JPL
710106	2013 PQ_{7}	—	October 10, 2008	Mount Lemmon	Mount Lemmon Survey	VER	2.2 km	MPC · JPL
710107	2013 PP_{8}	—	December 25, 2010	Mount Lemmon	Mount Lemmon Survey	·	1.7 km	MPC · JPL
710108	2013 PT_{8}	—	August 3, 2013	Haleakala	Pan-STARRS 1	·	2.6 km	MPC · JPL
710109	2013 PN_{9}	—	March 9, 2005	Mount Lemmon	Mount Lemmon Survey	·	2.4 km	MPC · JPL
710110	2013 PW_{9}	—	August 2, 2013	Haleakala	Pan-STARRS 1	·	980 m	MPC · JPL
710111	2013 PC_{10}	—	August 4, 2013	Haleakala	Pan-STARRS 1	·	2.6 km	MPC · JPL
710112	2013 PL_{11}	—	August 4, 2013	Palomar	Palomar Transient Factory	PHO	740 m	MPC · JPL
710113	2013 PN_{14}	—	August 7, 2013	Haleakala	Pan-STARRS 1	NYS	950 m	MPC · JPL
710114	2013 PF_{15}	—	July 14, 2013	Haleakala	Pan-STARRS 1	·	600 m	MPC · JPL
710115	2013 PK_{15}	—	July 15, 2013	Haleakala	Pan-STARRS 1	·	2.0 km	MPC · JPL
710116	2013 PM_{16}	—	August 7, 2013	Haleakala	Pan-STARRS 1	·	2.5 km	MPC · JPL
710117	2013 PU_{19}	—	July 27, 2009	Kitt Peak	Spacewatch	MAS	660 m	MPC · JPL
710118	2013 PH_{22}	—	August 8, 2013	Haleakala	Pan-STARRS 1	ELF	2.9 km	MPC · JPL
710119	2013 PP_{22}	—	August 8, 2013	Haleakala	Pan-STARRS 1	VER	1.9 km	MPC · JPL
710120	2013 PZ_{22}	—	August 8, 2013	Haleakala	Pan-STARRS 1	·	1.7 km	MPC · JPL
710121	2013 PF_{23}	—	March 13, 2012	Mount Lemmon	Mount Lemmon Survey	·	890 m	MPC · JPL
710122	2013 PA_{25}	—	August 8, 2013	Kitt Peak	Spacewatch	·	1.6 km	MPC · JPL
710123	2013 PG_{30}	—	March 8, 2008	Kitt Peak	Spacewatch	·	1.1 km	MPC · JPL
710124	2013 PA_{32}	—	August 7, 2013	Kitt Peak	Spacewatch	·	2.4 km	MPC · JPL
710125	2013 PZ_{33}	—	June 10, 2013	Catalina	CSS	·	1.5 km	MPC · JPL
710126	2013 PN_{35}	—	June 22, 2007	Kitt Peak	Spacewatch	THM	1.9 km	MPC · JPL
710127	2013 PN_{38}	—	July 14, 2013	Haleakala	Pan-STARRS 1	·	2.3 km	MPC · JPL
710128	2013 PP_{39}	—	August 9, 2013	Kitt Peak	Spacewatch	·	2.9 km	MPC · JPL
710129	2013 PT_{40}	—	August 12, 2013	Haleakala	Pan-STARRS 1	·	2.2 km	MPC · JPL
710130	2013 PZ_{41}	—	August 9, 2013	Haleakala	Pan-STARRS 1	·	2.2 km	MPC · JPL
710131	2013 PC_{43}	—	August 9, 2013	Catalina	CSS	·	680 m	MPC · JPL
710132	2013 PM_{46}	—	January 13, 2011	Kitt Peak	Spacewatch	·	2.6 km	MPC · JPL
710133	2013 PD_{47}	—	December 9, 2010	Mount Lemmon	Mount Lemmon Survey	·	3.2 km	MPC · JPL
710134	2013 PM_{48}	—	September 14, 2002	Palomar	NEAT	NYS	1.1 km	MPC · JPL
710135	2013 PZ_{49}	—	August 2, 2013	Piszkés-tető	K. Sárneczky, S. Kürti	·	2.5 km	MPC · JPL
710136	2013 PD_{52}	—	July 8, 2003	Kitt Peak	Spacewatch	·	530 m	MPC · JPL
710137	2013 PR_{52}	—	September 22, 2008	Kitt Peak	Spacewatch	·	2.5 km	MPC · JPL
710138	2013 PP_{53}	—	August 14, 2013	Haleakala	Pan-STARRS 1	·	2.1 km	MPC · JPL
710139	2013 PY_{53}	—	August 14, 2013	Haleakala	Pan-STARRS 1	·	2.8 km	MPC · JPL
710140	2013 PP_{54}	—	September 13, 2005	Kitt Peak	Spacewatch	·	740 m	MPC · JPL
710141	2013 PE_{56}	—	May 29, 2006	Kitt Peak	Spacewatch	·	2.3 km	MPC · JPL
710142	2013 PJ_{56}	—	October 26, 2006	Mauna Kea	P. A. Wiegert	NYS	830 m	MPC · JPL
710143	2013 PJ_{60}	—	June 20, 2013	Haleakala	Pan-STARRS 1	·	2.3 km	MPC · JPL
710144	2013 PE_{62}	—	February 27, 2012	Haleakala	Pan-STARRS 1	·	920 m	MPC · JPL
710145	2013 PM_{64}	—	September 7, 2008	Mount Lemmon	Mount Lemmon Survey	·	2.2 km	MPC · JPL
710146	2013 PC_{66}	—	August 15, 2013	Haleakala	Pan-STARRS 1	·	1.0 km	MPC · JPL
710147	2013 PS_{67}	—	August 12, 2013	Kitt Peak	Spacewatch	·	2.5 km	MPC · JPL
710148	2013 PT_{67}	—	November 16, 2006	Lulin	LUSS	·	1.0 km	MPC · JPL
710149	2013 PX_{70}	—	September 15, 2009	Kitt Peak	Spacewatch	·	1.4 km	MPC · JPL
710150	2013 PV_{71}	—	July 15, 2013	Haleakala	Pan-STARRS 1	·	1.5 km	MPC · JPL
710151	2013 PN_{73}	—	September 11, 2002	Palomar	NEAT	·	3.0 km	MPC · JPL
710152	2013 PA_{76}	—	August 15, 2013	Haleakala	Pan-STARRS 1	·	2.1 km	MPC · JPL
710153	2013 PH_{76}	—	August 14, 2013	Haleakala	Pan-STARRS 1	·	780 m	MPC · JPL
710154	2013 PY_{77}	—	August 15, 2013	Haleakala	Pan-STARRS 1	·	2.5 km	MPC · JPL
710155	2013 PZ_{77}	—	August 15, 2013	Haleakala	Pan-STARRS 1	·	1.9 km	MPC · JPL
710156	2013 PB_{80}	—	August 8, 2013	Haleakala	Pan-STARRS 1	V	430 m	MPC · JPL
710157	2013 PD_{81}	—	August 12, 2013	Haleakala	Pan-STARRS 1	EOS	1.5 km	MPC · JPL
710158	2013 PS_{83}	—	August 9, 2013	Kitt Peak	Spacewatch	NYS	860 m	MPC · JPL
710159	2013 PB_{86}	—	October 3, 2014	Mount Lemmon	Mount Lemmon Survey	·	2.7 km	MPC · JPL
710160	2013 PS_{90}	—	August 14, 2013	Haleakala	Pan-STARRS 1	·	2.5 km	MPC · JPL
710161	2013 PC_{92}	—	October 31, 2008	Mount Lemmon	Mount Lemmon Survey	·	2.4 km	MPC · JPL
710162	2013 PE_{100}	—	August 13, 2013	Kitt Peak	Spacewatch	MAS	610 m	MPC · JPL
710163	2013 PR_{100}	—	August 12, 2013	Haleakala	Pan-STARRS 1	HOF	1.6 km	MPC · JPL
710164	2013 PO_{101}	—	February 26, 2011	Mount Lemmon	Mount Lemmon Survey	VER	1.8 km	MPC · JPL
710165	2013 PR_{101}	—	August 15, 2013	Haleakala	Pan-STARRS 1	·	2.0 km	MPC · JPL
710166	2013 PW_{105}	—	September 18, 2009	Mount Lemmon	Mount Lemmon Survey	·	710 m	MPC · JPL
710167	2013 PM_{111}	—	February 2, 2008	Mount Lemmon	Mount Lemmon Survey	·	730 m	MPC · JPL
710168	2013 PU_{115}	—	August 14, 2013	Haleakala	Pan-STARRS 1	·	1.7 km	MPC · JPL
710169	2013 PK_{117}	—	August 15, 2013	Haleakala	Pan-STARRS 1	·	1.3 km	MPC · JPL
710170	2013 PE_{119}	—	August 12, 2013	Haleakala	Pan-STARRS 1	·	2.2 km	MPC · JPL
710171	2013 PU_{119}	—	August 12, 2013	Haleakala	Pan-STARRS 1	VER	2.0 km	MPC · JPL
710172	2013 PD_{124}	—	August 12, 2013	Haleakala	Pan-STARRS 1	·	950 m	MPC · JPL
710173	2013 PP_{124}	—	September 13, 2005	Kitt Peak	Spacewatch	KON	1.7 km	MPC · JPL
710174	2013 PC_{125}	—	November 3, 2007	Kitt Peak	Spacewatch	·	3.1 km	MPC · JPL
710175	2013 PA_{128}	—	August 14, 2013	Haleakala	Pan-STARRS 1	·	2.8 km	MPC · JPL
710176	2013 PR_{132}	—	August 8, 2013	Haleakala	Pan-STARRS 1	·	920 m	MPC · JPL
710177	2013 PN_{135}	—	August 15, 2013	Haleakala	Pan-STARRS 1	·	2.4 km	MPC · JPL
710178	2013 PY_{138}	—	August 15, 2013	Haleakala	Pan-STARRS 1	·	2.5 km	MPC · JPL
710179	2013 QA	—	December 22, 2003	Kitt Peak	Spacewatch	H	560 m	MPC · JPL
710180	2013 QS_{1}	—	January 29, 2012	Catalina	CSS	H	600 m	MPC · JPL
710181	2013 QJ_{3}	—	August 28, 2002	Palomar	NEAT	·	1.0 km	MPC · JPL
710182	2013 QU_{3}	—	February 26, 2012	Roque de los Muchachos	EURONEAR	·	750 m	MPC · JPL
710183	2013 QX_{12}	—	October 9, 2008	Mount Lemmon	Mount Lemmon Survey	·	1.5 km	MPC · JPL
710184	2013 QR_{13}	—	August 17, 2013	Haleakala	Pan-STARRS 1	·	2.6 km	MPC · JPL
710185	2013 QT_{17}	—	October 8, 2008	Kitt Peak	Spacewatch	·	2.6 km	MPC · JPL
710186	2013 QJ_{20}	—	September 4, 2008	Kitt Peak	Spacewatch	·	2.2 km	MPC · JPL
710187	2013 QL_{23}	—	March 17, 2012	Mount Lemmon	Mount Lemmon Survey	MIS	2.0 km	MPC · JPL
710188	2013 QL_{26}	—	August 30, 2002	Kitt Peak	Spacewatch	MAS	650 m	MPC · JPL
710189	2013 QU_{26}	—	August 14, 2013	Haleakala	Pan-STARRS 1	·	640 m	MPC · JPL
710190	2013 QH_{27}	—	March 26, 2001	Kitt Peak	Deep Ecliptic Survey	·	970 m	MPC · JPL
710191	2013 QC_{31}	—	June 20, 2013	Haleakala	Pan-STARRS 1	TIN	930 m	MPC · JPL
710192	2013 QD_{31}	—	March 11, 2005	Kitt Peak	Deep Ecliptic Survey	·	1.2 km	MPC · JPL
710193	2013 QN_{31}	—	August 12, 2013	Haleakala	Pan-STARRS 1	·	630 m	MPC · JPL
710194	2013 QR_{31}	—	September 28, 2008	Mount Lemmon	Mount Lemmon Survey	EOS	1.3 km	MPC · JPL
710195	2013 QJ_{32}	—	September 20, 2008	Kitt Peak	Spacewatch	·	1.9 km	MPC · JPL
710196	2013 QS_{36}	—	September 19, 1998	Apache Point	SDSS Collaboration	·	1.9 km	MPC · JPL
710197	2013 QB_{37}	—	August 9, 2013	Kitt Peak	Spacewatch	·	2.3 km	MPC · JPL
710198	2013 QY_{38}	—	April 15, 2012	Haleakala	Pan-STARRS 1	LIX	2.5 km	MPC · JPL
710199	2013 QE_{40}	—	August 12, 2013	Haleakala	Pan-STARRS 1	EOS	1.6 km	MPC · JPL
710200	2013 QZ_{43}	—	August 12, 2013	Haleakala	Pan-STARRS 1	·	2.5 km	MPC · JPL

== 710201–710300 ==
back to top

Designation			Discovery			Properties		Ref
Permanent	Provisional	Named after	Date	Site	Discoverer(s)	Category	Diam.	Ref
710201	2013 QT_{47}	—	October 3, 2002	Palomar	NEAT	·	3.2 km	MPC · JPL
710202	2013 QG_{49}	—	August 12, 2013	Haleakala	Pan-STARRS 1	EOS	1.3 km	MPC · JPL
710203	2013 QK_{50}	—	August 8, 2013	Kitt Peak	Spacewatch	·	2.4 km	MPC · JPL
710204	2013 QT_{51}	—	January 23, 2006	Kitt Peak	Spacewatch	·	1.9 km	MPC · JPL
710205	2013 QF_{53}	—	August 26, 2013	Haleakala	Pan-STARRS 1	·	2.1 km	MPC · JPL
710206	2013 QX_{54}	—	November 3, 2008	Mount Lemmon	Mount Lemmon Survey	·	2.3 km	MPC · JPL
710207	2013 QJ_{58}	—	August 26, 2013	Haleakala	Pan-STARRS 1	·	3.0 km	MPC · JPL
710208	2013 QF_{62}	—	August 19, 2006	Kitt Peak	Spacewatch	·	730 m	MPC · JPL
710209	2013 QY_{62}	—	March 5, 2006	Kitt Peak	Spacewatch	TIR	2.7 km	MPC · JPL
710210	2013 QU_{64}	—	May 4, 2009	Mount Lemmon	Mount Lemmon Survey	NYS	1.0 km	MPC · JPL
710211	2013 QB_{70}	—	August 8, 2013	Kitt Peak	Spacewatch	ARM	3.8 km	MPC · JPL
710212	2013 QP_{70}	—	August 31, 2013	Piszkéstető	K. Sárneczky	MAS	720 m	MPC · JPL
710213	2013 QP_{73}	—	August 9, 2013	Haleakala	Pan-STARRS 1	NYS	970 m	MPC · JPL
710214	2013 QC_{78}	—	May 14, 2012	Mount Lemmon	Mount Lemmon Survey	·	2.4 km	MPC · JPL
710215	2013 QQ_{78}	—	August 28, 2013	Catalina	CSS	EUN	1.1 km	MPC · JPL
710216	2013 QZ_{79}	—	March 14, 2012	Mount Lemmon	Mount Lemmon Survey	·	1.0 km	MPC · JPL
710217	2013 QP_{80}	—	July 16, 2002	Palomar	NEAT	·	2.1 km	MPC · JPL
710218	2013 QP_{81}	—	September 27, 2006	Mount Lemmon	Mount Lemmon Survey	·	1.1 km	MPC · JPL
710219	2013 QT_{81}	—	February 26, 2004	Kitt Peak	Deep Ecliptic Survey	·	880 m	MPC · JPL
710220	2013 QH_{86}	—	August 26, 2013	Haleakala	Pan-STARRS 1	·	620 m	MPC · JPL
710221	2013 QR_{86}	—	May 30, 2012	Kitt Peak	Spacewatch	·	3.0 km	MPC · JPL
710222	2013 QJ_{87}	—	August 26, 2013	Haleakala	Pan-STARRS 1	VER	2.4 km	MPC · JPL
710223	2013 QT_{91}	—	September 25, 2006	Kitt Peak	Spacewatch	NYS	850 m	MPC · JPL
710224	2013 QL_{92}	—	October 9, 2008	Mount Lemmon	Mount Lemmon Survey	·	2.9 km	MPC · JPL
710225	2013 QM_{92}	—	August 9, 2013	Kitt Peak	Spacewatch	·	2.6 km	MPC · JPL
710226	2013 QQ_{92}	—	March 24, 2012	Mount Lemmon	Mount Lemmon Survey	·	1.1 km	MPC · JPL
710227	2013 QV_{92}	—	August 12, 2013	Haleakala	Pan-STARRS 1	·	3.0 km	MPC · JPL
710228	2013 QL_{99}	—	August 31, 2013	Haleakala	Pan-STARRS 1	VER	2.0 km	MPC · JPL
710229	2013 QR_{100}	—	August 26, 2013	Haleakala	Pan-STARRS 1	·	2.6 km	MPC · JPL
710230	2013 QA_{101}	—	August 27, 2013	Haleakala	Pan-STARRS 1	·	1.6 km	MPC · JPL
710231 Jávorkaágoston	2013 QW_{101}	Jávorkaágoston	August 31, 2013	Piszkés-tető	K. Sárneczky, T. Csörgei	·	570 m	MPC · JPL
710232	2013 QG_{104}	—	February 11, 2011	Mount Lemmon	Mount Lemmon Survey	·	2.0 km	MPC · JPL
710233	2013 QG_{107}	—	August 26, 2013	Haleakala	Pan-STARRS 1	·	760 m	MPC · JPL
710234	2013 RQ_{2}	—	November 20, 2008	Mount Lemmon	Mount Lemmon Survey	·	2.1 km	MPC · JPL
710235	2013 RW_{8}	—	September 2, 2013	Haleakala	Pan-STARRS 1	·	2.8 km	MPC · JPL
710236	2013 RX_{14}	—	May 6, 2006	Mount Lemmon	Mount Lemmon Survey	THM	2.5 km	MPC · JPL
710237	2013 RA_{19}	—	September 11, 2002	Palomar	NEAT	·	1.2 km	MPC · JPL
710238	2013 RN_{22}	—	September 2, 2013	Mount Lemmon	Mount Lemmon Survey	·	930 m	MPC · JPL
710239	2013 RK_{26}	—	October 29, 2010	Kitt Peak	Spacewatch	·	640 m	MPC · JPL
710240	2013 RS_{26}	—	September 19, 2006	Kitt Peak	Spacewatch	·	660 m	MPC · JPL
710241	2013 RH_{29}	—	September 4, 2013	Mount Lemmon	Mount Lemmon Survey	·	1.1 km	MPC · JPL
710242	2013 RK_{30}	—	September 24, 2008	Mount Lemmon	Mount Lemmon Survey	H	460 m	MPC · JPL
710243	2013 RK_{35}	—	September 6, 2013	Mount Lemmon	Mount Lemmon Survey	·	2.6 km	MPC · JPL
710244	2013 RW_{37}	—	September 3, 2013	Haleakala	Pan-STARRS 1	·	880 m	MPC · JPL
710245	2013 RD_{38}	—	September 3, 2013	Mount Lemmon	Mount Lemmon Survey	·	2.3 km	MPC · JPL
710246	2013 RE_{41}	—	September 12, 2002	Palomar	NEAT	·	1 km	MPC · JPL
710247	2013 RN_{41}	—	October 15, 2007	Mount Lemmon	Mount Lemmon Survey	·	2.6 km	MPC · JPL
710248	2013 RK_{43}	—	February 9, 2008	Catalina	CSS	·	380 m	MPC · JPL
710249	2013 RJ_{46}	—	October 2, 2008	Mount Lemmon	Mount Lemmon Survey	·	2.3 km	MPC · JPL
710250	2013 RT_{46}	—	March 28, 2008	Mount Lemmon	Mount Lemmon Survey	·	640 m	MPC · JPL
710251	2013 RY_{54}	—	January 28, 2011	Mount Lemmon	Mount Lemmon Survey	·	1.7 km	MPC · JPL
710252	2013 RJ_{55}	—	September 10, 2013	Haleakala	Pan-STARRS 1	·	3.3 km	MPC · JPL
710253	2013 RR_{55}	—	September 2, 2013	Palomar	Palomar Transient Factory	·	1.6 km	MPC · JPL
710254	2013 RN_{57}	—	September 10, 2013	Haleakala	Pan-STARRS 1	·	2.6 km	MPC · JPL
710255	2013 RK_{60}	—	September 10, 2013	Haleakala	Pan-STARRS 1	URS	2.8 km	MPC · JPL
710256	2013 RY_{62}	—	October 29, 2008	Kitt Peak	Spacewatch	·	2.4 km	MPC · JPL
710257	2013 RD_{63}	—	September 18, 2003	Kitt Peak	Spacewatch	·	580 m	MPC · JPL
710258	2013 RO_{64}	—	December 13, 2006	Kitt Peak	Spacewatch	·	980 m	MPC · JPL
710259	2013 RP_{65}	—	September 1, 2013	Mount Lemmon	Mount Lemmon Survey	·	2.2 km	MPC · JPL
710260	2013 RS_{67}	—	October 2, 2008	Kitt Peak	Spacewatch	·	1.5 km	MPC · JPL
710261	2013 RQ_{71}	—	September 14, 2013	Kitt Peak	Spacewatch	·	2.6 km	MPC · JPL
710262	2013 RQ_{74}	—	May 21, 2012	Mount Lemmon	Mount Lemmon Survey	LIX	3.2 km	MPC · JPL
710263	2013 RG_{75}	—	September 18, 2003	Palomar	NEAT	·	630 m	MPC · JPL
710264	2013 RM_{75}	—	October 28, 2008	Kitt Peak	Spacewatch	·	2.3 km	MPC · JPL
710265	2013 RS_{82}	—	March 13, 2007	Mauna Kea	D. D. Balam, K. M. Perrett	·	1.4 km	MPC · JPL
710266	2013 RJ_{83}	—	November 3, 2008	Kitt Peak	Spacewatch	·	2.8 km	MPC · JPL
710267	2013 RN_{85}	—	September 13, 2013	Kitt Peak	Spacewatch	·	1.2 km	MPC · JPL
710268	2013 RP_{86}	—	September 13, 2013	Kitt Peak	Spacewatch	·	2.6 km	MPC · JPL
710269	2013 RO_{87}	—	September 3, 2013	Calar Alto	F. Hormuth	·	2.2 km	MPC · JPL
710270	2013 RE_{92}	—	March 10, 2011	Kitt Peak	Spacewatch	·	2.3 km	MPC · JPL
710271	2013 RK_{96}	—	September 14, 2013	Haleakala	Pan-STARRS 1	APO	550 m	MPC · JPL
710272	2013 RF_{101}	—	August 9, 2005	Cerro Tololo	Deep Ecliptic Survey	·	1.2 km	MPC · JPL
710273	2013 RO_{101}	—	February 9, 2005	La Silla	A. Boattini	EOS	1.6 km	MPC · JPL
710274	2013 RP_{101}	—	September 14, 2007	Saint-Sulpice	B. Christophe	·	2.4 km	MPC · JPL
710275	2013 RO_{104}	—	September 3, 2013	Haleakala	Pan-STARRS 1	·	1.1 km	MPC · JPL
710276	2013 RR_{104}	—	September 3, 2013	Haleakala	Pan-STARRS 1	·	2.1 km	MPC · JPL
710277	2013 RV_{104}	—	September 5, 2013	Kitt Peak	Spacewatch	·	2.5 km	MPC · JPL
710278	2013 RH_{106}	—	September 14, 2007	Mount Lemmon	Mount Lemmon Survey	(3460)	2.2 km	MPC · JPL
710279	2013 RZ_{106}	—	September 14, 2013	Haleakala	Pan-STARRS 1	·	2.5 km	MPC · JPL
710280	2013 RT_{107}	—	September 15, 2013	Haleakala	Pan-STARRS 1	·	2.5 km	MPC · JPL
710281	2013 RX_{107}	—	September 1, 2013	Catalina	CSS	·	1.1 km	MPC · JPL
710282	2013 RY_{107}	—	August 8, 2013	Haleakala	Pan-STARRS 1	·	2.2 km	MPC · JPL
710283	2013 RU_{108}	—	September 12, 2013	Mount Lemmon	Mount Lemmon Survey	·	3.0 km	MPC · JPL
710284	2013 RN_{119}	—	October 4, 2007	Mount Lemmon	Mount Lemmon Survey	·	2.2 km	MPC · JPL
710285	2013 RT_{129}	—	September 2, 2013	Mount Lemmon	Mount Lemmon Survey	·	2.4 km	MPC · JPL
710286	2013 RA_{131}	—	September 3, 2013	Kitt Peak	Spacewatch	·	2.2 km	MPC · JPL
710287	2013 RN_{131}	—	September 3, 2013	Haleakala	Pan-STARRS 1	·	2.2 km	MPC · JPL
710288	2013 RN_{134}	—	September 13, 2013	Mount Lemmon	Mount Lemmon Survey	·	2.6 km	MPC · JPL
710289	2013 RZ_{134}	—	September 1, 2013	Catalina	CSS	·	650 m	MPC · JPL
710290	2013 RO_{137}	—	September 14, 2013	Haleakala	Pan-STARRS 1	·	2.3 km	MPC · JPL
710291	2013 RK_{139}	—	September 6, 2013	Catalina	CSS	·	640 m	MPC · JPL
710292	2013 RX_{141}	—	September 10, 2013	Haleakala	Pan-STARRS 1	·	2.4 km	MPC · JPL
710293	2013 RV_{153}	—	September 15, 2013	Mount Lemmon	Mount Lemmon Survey	·	970 m	MPC · JPL
710294	2013 RN_{154}	—	September 13, 2013	Kitt Peak	Spacewatch	·	2.1 km	MPC · JPL
710295	2013 RL_{159}	—	September 1, 2013	Mount Lemmon	Mount Lemmon Survey	·	1.1 km	MPC · JPL
710296	2013 RL_{164}	—	September 14, 2013	Haleakala	Pan-STARRS 1	EUP	2.4 km	MPC · JPL
710297	2013 RN_{164}	—	September 1, 2013	Haleakala	Pan-STARRS 1	·	2.0 km	MPC · JPL
710298	2013 RO_{178}	—	September 15, 2013	Mount Lemmon	Mount Lemmon Survey	KOR	960 m	MPC · JPL
710299	2013 RU_{178}	—	September 9, 2013	Haleakala	Pan-STARRS 1	·	950 m	MPC · JPL
710300	2013 RD_{182}	—	March 5, 2011	Mount Lemmon	Mount Lemmon Survey	·	940 m	MPC · JPL

== 710301–710400 ==
back to top

Designation			Discovery			Properties		Ref
Permanent	Provisional	Named after	Date	Site	Discoverer(s)	Category	Diam.	Ref
710301	2013 SS_{1}	—	March 15, 2008	Mount Lemmon	Mount Lemmon Survey	·	1.0 km	MPC · JPL
710302	2013 SL_{2}	—	October 28, 2008	Mount Lemmon	Mount Lemmon Survey	THM	1.9 km	MPC · JPL
710303	2013 SL_{3}	—	December 26, 2006	Kitt Peak	Spacewatch	NYS	1.2 km	MPC · JPL
710304	2013 SF_{5}	—	September 14, 2007	Mount Lemmon	Mount Lemmon Survey	ELF	3.2 km	MPC · JPL
710305	2013 SA_{6}	—	September 7, 2008	Mount Lemmon	Mount Lemmon Survey	·	1.5 km	MPC · JPL
710306	2013 SZ_{11}	—	August 12, 2013	Kitt Peak	Spacewatch	·	3.4 km	MPC · JPL
710307	2013 SY_{12}	—	August 14, 2013	Haleakala	Pan-STARRS 1	·	1.1 km	MPC · JPL
710308	2013 SC_{15}	—	September 2, 2013	Catalina	CSS	·	980 m	MPC · JPL
710309	2013 SL_{17}	—	September 3, 2013	Mount Lemmon	Mount Lemmon Survey	·	960 m	MPC · JPL
710310	2013 SO_{18}	—	January 17, 2007	Kitt Peak	Spacewatch	MAS	650 m	MPC · JPL
710311	2013 SR_{18}	—	September 6, 2013	Catalina	CSS	·	3.3 km	MPC · JPL
710312	2013 SW_{22}	—	September 11, 2002	Palomar	NEAT	·	930 m	MPC · JPL
710313	2013 SC_{23}	—	March 28, 2008	Kitt Peak	Spacewatch	·	1.1 km	MPC · JPL
710314	2013 SY_{23}	—	September 12, 2007	Catalina	CSS	(45637)	3.2 km	MPC · JPL
710315	2013 SZ_{23}	—	September 28, 2013	Elena Remote	Oreshko, A.	·	3.1 km	MPC · JPL
710316	2013 SK_{29}	—	September 13, 2013	Mount Lemmon	Mount Lemmon Survey	DOR	1.7 km	MPC · JPL
710317	2013 SS_{29}	—	August 18, 2007	Anderson Mesa	LONEOS	·	2.6 km	MPC · JPL
710318	2013 SX_{31}	—	September 1, 2013	Mount Lemmon	Mount Lemmon Survey	KOR	1.0 km	MPC · JPL
710319	2013 SU_{40}	—	September 26, 2013	Calar Alto-CASADO	Mottola, S.	PHO	680 m	MPC · JPL
710320	2013 SY_{44}	—	November 20, 2009	Kitt Peak	Spacewatch	·	1.4 km	MPC · JPL
710321	2013 SA_{45}	—	September 1, 2013	Mount Lemmon	Mount Lemmon Survey	·	650 m	MPC · JPL
710322	2013 SE_{46}	—	March 13, 2005	Kitt Peak	Spacewatch	·	650 m	MPC · JPL
710323	2013 SB_{49}	—	November 27, 2006	Mount Lemmon	Mount Lemmon Survey	·	1.1 km	MPC · JPL
710324	2013 SS_{53}	—	March 16, 2005	Kitt Peak	Spacewatch	·	2.6 km	MPC · JPL
710325	2013 SG_{57}	—	April 28, 2011	Mount Lemmon	Mount Lemmon Survey	·	2.4 km	MPC · JPL
710326	2013 SM_{64}	—	August 15, 2013	Haleakala	Pan-STARRS 1	·	1.1 km	MPC · JPL
710327	2013 SP_{69}	—	October 19, 2006	Kitt Peak	Deep Ecliptic Survey	·	640 m	MPC · JPL
710328	2013 SW_{72}	—	October 16, 2002	Palomar	NEAT	PHO	800 m	MPC · JPL
710329	2013 SB_{73}	—	November 14, 2002	Palomar	NEAT	·	1.3 km	MPC · JPL
710330	2013 SO_{74}	—	October 24, 2008	Mount Lemmon	Mount Lemmon Survey	·	2.2 km	MPC · JPL
710331	2013 SO_{78}	—	September 6, 2013	Kitt Peak	Spacewatch	·	2.8 km	MPC · JPL
710332	2013 SN_{82}	—	September 5, 2013	Kitt Peak	Spacewatch	·	900 m	MPC · JPL
710333	2013 SG_{87}	—	September 10, 2013	Haleakala	Pan-STARRS 1	·	3.2 km	MPC · JPL
710334	2013 SA_{88}	—	June 15, 2012	Haleakala	Pan-STARRS 1	·	2.3 km	MPC · JPL
710335	2013 SJ_{89}	—	January 27, 2007	Kitt Peak	Spacewatch	·	1.1 km	MPC · JPL
710336	2013 SN_{94}	—	March 10, 2011	Kitt Peak	Spacewatch	HYG	2.2 km	MPC · JPL
710337	2013 SQ_{94}	—	March 11, 2011	Kitt Peak	Spacewatch	·	2.8 km	MPC · JPL
710338	2013 SG_{95}	—	October 2, 2008	Kitt Peak	Spacewatch	·	1.9 km	MPC · JPL
710339	2013 SJ_{96}	—	December 26, 2014	Haleakala	Pan-STARRS 1	·	1.8 km	MPC · JPL
710340	2013 SE_{102}	—	September 30, 2013	Mount Lemmon	Mount Lemmon Survey	·	830 m	MPC · JPL
710341	2013 SX_{102}	—	September 24, 2013	Mount Lemmon	Mount Lemmon Survey	PHO	790 m	MPC · JPL
710342	2013 SA_{103}	—	December 15, 2014	Mount Lemmon	Mount Lemmon Survey	EOS	2.0 km	MPC · JPL
710343	2013 SX_{104}	—	September 27, 2013	Haleakala	Pan-STARRS 1	·	3.5 km	MPC · JPL
710344	2013 SX_{106}	—	December 26, 2014	Haleakala	Pan-STARRS 1	·	2.8 km	MPC · JPL
710345	2013 SS_{107}	—	September 24, 2013	Mount Lemmon	Mount Lemmon Survey	·	840 m	MPC · JPL
710346	2013 SJ_{114}	—	September 29, 2013	Kitt Peak	Spacewatch	EOS	1.5 km	MPC · JPL
710347	2013 TB	—	September 12, 2013	Kislovodsk	Nevski, V.	H	470 m	MPC · JPL
710348	2013 TT_{1}	—	October 1, 2013	Elena Remote	Oreshko, A.	·	600 m	MPC · JPL
710349	2013 TK_{2}	—	April 18, 2006	Kitt Peak	Spacewatch	·	2.8 km	MPC · JPL
710350	2013 TR_{8}	—	September 6, 2013	Mount Lemmon	Mount Lemmon Survey	TIR	2.4 km	MPC · JPL
710351	2013 TY_{8}	—	September 2, 2013	Mount Lemmon	Mount Lemmon Survey	·	1.2 km	MPC · JPL
710352	2013 TY_{11}	—	September 13, 2002	Palomar	NEAT	·	1.0 km	MPC · JPL
710353	2013 TB_{14}	—	April 20, 2012	Mount Lemmon	Mount Lemmon Survey	·	1.2 km	MPC · JPL
710354	2013 TE_{15}	—	September 14, 2013	Kitt Peak	Spacewatch	·	2.7 km	MPC · JPL
710355	2013 TC_{16}	—	October 1, 2013	Mount Lemmon	Mount Lemmon Survey	EUN	880 m	MPC · JPL
710356	2013 TE_{18}	—	September 7, 2004	Kitt Peak	Spacewatch	·	1.3 km	MPC · JPL
710357	2013 TY_{19}	—	October 1, 2013	Mount Lemmon	Mount Lemmon Survey	·	2.1 km	MPC · JPL
710358	2013 TS_{20}	—	October 1, 2013	Mount Lemmon	Mount Lemmon Survey	L5	6.1 km	MPC · JPL
710359	2013 TP_{25}	—	August 10, 2007	Kitt Peak	Spacewatch	·	2.1 km	MPC · JPL
710360	2013 TQ_{26}	—	September 4, 2013	Mount Lemmon	Mount Lemmon Survey	·	2.8 km	MPC · JPL
710361	2013 TS_{30}	—	October 1, 2013	Kitt Peak	Spacewatch	·	660 m	MPC · JPL
710362	2013 TT_{36}	—	October 2, 2013	Haleakala	Pan-STARRS 1	·	2.4 km	MPC · JPL
710363	2013 TL_{40}	—	October 30, 2002	Kitt Peak	Spacewatch	MAS	760 m	MPC · JPL
710364	2013 TO_{41}	—	July 26, 2005	Palomar	NEAT	·	1.0 km	MPC · JPL
710365	2013 TM_{48}	—	October 1, 2013	Palomar	Palomar Transient Factory	·	910 m	MPC · JPL
710366	2013 TD_{49}	—	October 2, 2013	Mount Lemmon	Mount Lemmon Survey	·	890 m	MPC · JPL
710367	2013 TS_{56}	—	October 4, 2013	Mount Lemmon	Mount Lemmon Survey	·	1.1 km	MPC · JPL
710368	2013 TZ_{60}	—	October 4, 2013	Mount Lemmon	Mount Lemmon Survey	·	1.0 km	MPC · JPL
710369	2013 TQ_{63}	—	October 4, 2013	Mount Lemmon	Mount Lemmon Survey	·	2.5 km	MPC · JPL
710370	2013 TU_{63}	—	September 13, 2007	Mount Lemmon	Mount Lemmon Survey	·	2.4 km	MPC · JPL
710371	2013 TR_{64}	—	September 12, 2001	Kitt Peak	Spacewatch	·	2.7 km	MPC · JPL
710372	2013 TM_{65}	—	October 4, 2013	Mount Lemmon	Mount Lemmon Survey	·	2.1 km	MPC · JPL
710373	2013 TS_{65}	—	September 26, 2013	Catalina	CSS	·	690 m	MPC · JPL
710374	2013 TL_{66}	—	October 23, 2008	Mount Lemmon	Mount Lemmon Survey	·	3.4 km	MPC · JPL
710375	2013 TC_{67}	—	December 5, 2002	Socorro	LINEAR	·	2.6 km	MPC · JPL
710376	2013 TB_{68}	—	September 23, 2013	Haleakala	Pan-STARRS 1	·	3.2 km	MPC · JPL
710377	2013 TN_{72}	—	October 3, 2013	Catalina	CSS	ELF	3.0 km	MPC · JPL
710378	2013 TD_{76}	—	November 1, 2008	Mount Lemmon	Mount Lemmon Survey	·	2.7 km	MPC · JPL
710379	2013 TB_{78}	—	October 5, 2013	Haleakala	Pan-STARRS 1	·	1.0 km	MPC · JPL
710380	2013 TG_{89}	—	October 1, 2013	Kitt Peak	Spacewatch	·	680 m	MPC · JPL
710381	2013 TC_{91}	—	June 17, 2005	Mount Lemmon	Mount Lemmon Survey	MAS	720 m	MPC · JPL
710382	2013 TY_{93}	—	November 25, 2006	Kitt Peak	Spacewatch	·	780 m	MPC · JPL
710383	2013 TK_{99}	—	September 19, 2009	Kitt Peak	Spacewatch	·	1.1 km	MPC · JPL
710384	2013 TA_{100}	—	July 8, 2005	Kitt Peak	Spacewatch	·	1.2 km	MPC · JPL
710385	2013 TE_{101}	—	October 17, 2010	Mount Lemmon	Mount Lemmon Survey	·	630 m	MPC · JPL
710386	2013 TG_{105}	—	October 2, 2013	Palomar	Palomar Transient Factory	·	980 m	MPC · JPL
710387	2013 TM_{106}	—	August 18, 2009	La Sagra	OAM	MAS	690 m	MPC · JPL
710388	2013 TQ_{115}	—	October 4, 2013	Mount Lemmon	Mount Lemmon Survey	(1118)	2.6 km	MPC · JPL
710389	2013 TN_{116}	—	June 18, 2002	Palomar	NEAT	·	900 m	MPC · JPL
710390	2013 TS_{122}	—	October 5, 2013	Mount Lemmon	Mount Lemmon Survey	·	2.4 km	MPC · JPL
710391	2013 TC_{123}	—	October 5, 2013	Haleakala	Pan-STARRS 1	·	2.4 km	MPC · JPL
710392	2013 TH_{123}	—	September 6, 2013	Kitt Peak	Spacewatch	EUN	910 m	MPC · JPL
710393	2013 TB_{129}	—	October 9, 2008	Mount Lemmon	Mount Lemmon Survey	·	2.7 km	MPC · JPL
710394	2013 TL_{132}	—	August 1, 2009	Kitt Peak	Spacewatch	·	1.0 km	MPC · JPL
710395	2013 TR_{134}	—	October 12, 2013	Oukaïmeden	C. Rinner	·	1.3 km	MPC · JPL
710396	2013 TG_{138}	—	October 11, 2013	Calar Alto-CASADO	Mottola, S., Hellmich, S.	·	2.8 km	MPC · JPL
710397	2013 TE_{144}	—	October 12, 2013	Mount Lemmon	Mount Lemmon Survey	MAS	620 m	MPC · JPL
710398	2013 TN_{144}	—	October 3, 2013	Haleakala	Pan-STARRS 1	·	2.9 km	MPC · JPL
710399	2013 TB_{146}	—	July 15, 2013	Haleakala	Pan-STARRS 1	·	2.2 km	MPC · JPL
710400	2013 TM_{148}	—	August 30, 2013	Haleakala	Pan-STARRS 1	·	2.5 km	MPC · JPL

== 710401–710500 ==
back to top

Designation			Discovery			Properties		Ref
Permanent	Provisional	Named after	Date	Site	Discoverer(s)	Category	Diam.	Ref
710401	2013 TA_{149}	—	August 12, 2013	Haleakala	Pan-STARRS 1	·	2.3 km	MPC · JPL
710402	2013 TC_{152}	—	September 20, 2007	Kitt Peak	Spacewatch	·	2.4 km	MPC · JPL
710403	2013 TY_{153}	—	October 5, 2013	Kitt Peak	M. W. Buie	·	490 m	MPC · JPL
710404	2013 TD_{155}	—	March 23, 2012	Kitt Peak	Spacewatch	·	2.6 km	MPC · JPL
710405	2013 TP_{160}	—	October 2, 2013	Mount Lemmon	Mount Lemmon Survey	·	2.3 km	MPC · JPL
710406	2013 TX_{161}	—	October 1, 2005	Mount Lemmon	Mount Lemmon Survey	·	810 m	MPC · JPL
710407	2013 TK_{162}	—	December 27, 2006	Mount Lemmon	Mount Lemmon Survey	NYS	950 m	MPC · JPL
710408	2013 TN_{164}	—	May 1, 2012	Mount Lemmon	Mount Lemmon Survey	·	1.4 km	MPC · JPL
710409	2013 TN_{165}	—	October 1, 2013	Kitt Peak	Spacewatch	·	2.1 km	MPC · JPL
710410	2013 TV_{168}	—	October 5, 2013	Kitt Peak	Spacewatch	·	2.1 km	MPC · JPL
710411	2013 TD_{171}	—	October 1, 2013	Mount Lemmon	Mount Lemmon Survey	·	1.3 km	MPC · JPL
710412	2013 TP_{171}	—	October 13, 2013	Mount Lemmon	Mount Lemmon Survey	·	570 m	MPC · JPL
710413	2013 TS_{171}	—	October 5, 2013	Mount Lemmon	Mount Lemmon Survey	·	2.3 km	MPC · JPL
710414	2013 TL_{176}	—	October 12, 2013	Kitt Peak	Spacewatch	·	2.4 km	MPC · JPL
710415	2013 TG_{182}	—	October 1, 2013	Kitt Peak	Spacewatch	·	2.4 km	MPC · JPL
710416	2013 TU_{193}	—	October 1, 2013	Mount Lemmon	Mount Lemmon Survey	EOS	1.6 km	MPC · JPL
710417	2013 TJ_{196}	—	October 1, 2013	Mount Lemmon	Mount Lemmon Survey	·	2.2 km	MPC · JPL
710418	2013 TO_{201}	—	October 3, 2013	Haleakala	Pan-STARRS 1	·	1.1 km	MPC · JPL
710419	2013 TX_{203}	—	October 3, 2013	Kitt Peak	Spacewatch	·	1.1 km	MPC · JPL
710420	2013 TD_{204}	—	October 3, 2013	Kitt Peak	Spacewatch	·	950 m	MPC · JPL
710421	2013 TG_{204}	—	October 3, 2013	Haleakala	Pan-STARRS 1	·	1.8 km	MPC · JPL
710422	2013 TS_{204}	—	October 5, 2013	Haleakala	Pan-STARRS 1	HOF	2.1 km	MPC · JPL
710423	2013 TW_{206}	—	October 9, 2013	Mount Lemmon	Mount Lemmon Survey	·	1.2 km	MPC · JPL
710424	2013 TS_{207}	—	August 10, 2013	Palomar	Palomar Transient Factory	·	690 m	MPC · JPL
710425	2013 TS_{217}	—	October 2, 2013	Mount Lemmon	Mount Lemmon Survey	·	2.5 km	MPC · JPL
710426	2013 TD_{218}	—	October 6, 2013	Kitt Peak	Spacewatch	·	2.8 km	MPC · JPL
710427	2013 TT_{220}	—	October 3, 2013	Mount Lemmon	Mount Lemmon Survey	L5	6.9 km	MPC · JPL
710428	2013 TQ_{223}	—	October 3, 2013	Haleakala	Pan-STARRS 1	NYS	860 m	MPC · JPL
710429	2013 TH_{227}	—	October 2, 2013	Mount Lemmon	Mount Lemmon Survey	·	2.2 km	MPC · JPL
710430	2013 UF_{1}	—	September 20, 2006	Catalina	CSS	PHO	860 m	MPC · JPL
710431	2013 UE_{2}	—	November 30, 2005	Mount Lemmon	Mount Lemmon Survey	·	1.3 km	MPC · JPL
710432	2013 UV_{7}	—	October 7, 2013	Kitt Peak	Spacewatch	·	2.9 km	MPC · JPL
710433	2013 UV_{12}	—	February 27, 2006	Kitt Peak	Spacewatch	·	3.4 km	MPC · JPL
710434	2013 UD_{13}	—	September 21, 2003	Palomar	NEAT	·	850 m	MPC · JPL
710435	2013 US_{13}	—	September 3, 2013	Kitt Peak	Spacewatch	·	2.2 km	MPC · JPL
710436	2013 UR_{14}	—	September 6, 2013	Mount Lemmon	Mount Lemmon Survey	·	1.3 km	MPC · JPL
710437	2013 UQ_{22}	—	October 26, 2013	Kitt Peak	Spacewatch	VER	2.5 km	MPC · JPL
710438	2013 UA_{23}	—	October 16, 2013	Mount Lemmon	Mount Lemmon Survey	·	1.4 km	MPC · JPL
710439	2013 US_{23}	—	October 31, 2013	Kitt Peak	Spacewatch	·	1.3 km	MPC · JPL
710440	2013 UO_{24}	—	May 7, 2006	Mount Lemmon	Mount Lemmon Survey	·	3.7 km	MPC · JPL
710441	2013 UX_{33}	—	October 25, 2013	Mount Lemmon	Mount Lemmon Survey	·	2.5 km	MPC · JPL
710442	2013 UE_{34}	—	October 23, 2013	Mount Lemmon	Mount Lemmon Survey	(43176)	2.3 km	MPC · JPL
710443	2013 UQ_{39}	—	October 23, 2013	Mount Lemmon	Mount Lemmon Survey	·	920 m	MPC · JPL
710444	2013 UG_{44}	—	October 23, 2013	Haleakala	Pan-STARRS 1	URS	2.9 km	MPC · JPL
710445	2013 UE_{49}	—	October 25, 2013	Mount Lemmon	Mount Lemmon Survey	·	1.0 km	MPC · JPL
710446	2013 UM_{59}	—	October 26, 2013	Mount Lemmon	Mount Lemmon Survey	·	1.4 km	MPC · JPL
710447	2013 VQ_{5}	—	January 28, 2011	Mount Lemmon	Mount Lemmon Survey	·	910 m	MPC · JPL
710448	2013 VC_{6}	—	November 4, 2013	Elena Remote	Oreshko, A.	·	3.6 km	MPC · JPL
710449	2013 VR_{14}	—	October 11, 2013	Mayhill-ISON	L. Elenin	·	2.0 km	MPC · JPL
710450	2013 VJ_{15}	—	February 10, 2011	Mount Lemmon	Mount Lemmon Survey	·	1.1 km	MPC · JPL
710451	2013 VT_{21}	—	August 26, 2005	Palomar	NEAT	·	1.5 km	MPC · JPL
710452	2013 VS_{23}	—	October 8, 2013	XuYi	PMO NEO Survey Program	NYS	1.2 km	MPC · JPL
710453	2013 VW_{30}	—	November 23, 2006	Kitt Peak	Spacewatch	·	770 m	MPC · JPL
710454	2013 VG_{31}	—	November 9, 2013	Mount Lemmon	Mount Lemmon Survey	·	900 m	MPC · JPL
710455	2013 VQ_{41}	—	November 8, 2013	Kitt Peak	Spacewatch	·	3.1 km	MPC · JPL
710456	2013 VG_{42}	—	November 2, 2013	Mount Lemmon	Mount Lemmon Survey	·	2.2 km	MPC · JPL
710457	2013 VR_{44}	—	August 16, 2017	Haleakala	Pan-STARRS 1	NEM	1.6 km	MPC · JPL
710458	2013 VE_{51}	—	November 1, 2013	Mount Lemmon	Mount Lemmon Survey	·	660 m	MPC · JPL
710459	2013 VV_{51}	—	November 10, 2013	Mount Lemmon	Mount Lemmon Survey	·	1.3 km	MPC · JPL
710460	2013 VO_{58}	—	July 30, 2009	Kitt Peak	Spacewatch	·	880 m	MPC · JPL
710461	2013 VV_{68}	—	November 9, 2013	Mount Lemmon	Mount Lemmon Survey	·	1.4 km	MPC · JPL
710462	2013 VZ_{89}	—	November 9, 2013	Kitt Peak	Spacewatch	·	880 m	MPC · JPL
710463	2013 WK_{16}	—	November 27, 2013	Haleakala	Pan-STARRS 1	·	1.1 km	MPC · JPL
710464	2013 WN_{16}	—	November 27, 2013	Haleakala	Pan-STARRS 1	·	1.3 km	MPC · JPL
710465	2013 WQ_{17}	—	May 25, 2007	Mount Lemmon	Mount Lemmon Survey	HNS	1.2 km	MPC · JPL
710466	2013 WC_{19}	—	November 27, 2013	Haleakala	Pan-STARRS 1	·	1.3 km	MPC · JPL
710467	2013 WV_{38}	—	November 7, 2007	Kitt Peak	Spacewatch	·	2.8 km	MPC · JPL
710468	2013 WV_{48}	—	August 13, 2012	Siding Spring	SSS	·	3.1 km	MPC · JPL
710469	2013 WM_{50}	—	November 25, 2013	Haleakala	Pan-STARRS 1	·	970 m	MPC · JPL
710470	2013 WC_{70}	—	November 10, 2013	Kitt Peak	Spacewatch	MAS	580 m	MPC · JPL
710471	2013 WC_{74}	—	November 26, 2013	Haleakala	Pan-STARRS 1	·	940 m	MPC · JPL
710472	2013 WZ_{78}	—	October 28, 2013	Kitt Peak	Spacewatch	·	1.0 km	MPC · JPL
710473	2013 WR_{82}	—	January 16, 2011	Mount Lemmon	Mount Lemmon Survey	·	720 m	MPC · JPL
710474	2013 WT_{85}	—	November 27, 2009	Kitt Peak	Spacewatch	·	700 m	MPC · JPL
710475	2013 WP_{86}	—	July 11, 2004	Palomar	NEAT	·	1.4 km	MPC · JPL
710476	2013 WZ_{86}	—	November 27, 2013	Haleakala	Pan-STARRS 1	·	1.1 km	MPC · JPL
710477	2013 WU_{94}	—	November 28, 2013	Mount Lemmon	Mount Lemmon Survey	·	710 m	MPC · JPL
710478	2013 WB_{98}	—	November 28, 2013	Mount Lemmon	Mount Lemmon Survey	·	1.2 km	MPC · JPL
710479	2013 WH_{98}	—	November 29, 2005	Catalina	CSS	·	1.6 km	MPC · JPL
710480	2013 WN_{103}	—	September 15, 2009	Kitt Peak	Spacewatch	·	1.0 km	MPC · JPL
710481	2013 WO_{103}	—	September 25, 2007	Mount Lemmon	Mount Lemmon Survey	EUP	3.0 km	MPC · JPL
710482	2013 WC_{107}	—	September 26, 2009	Catalina	CSS	PHO	1.0 km	MPC · JPL
710483	2013 WN_{109}	—	November 9, 2013	Haleakala	Pan-STARRS 1	·	1.1 km	MPC · JPL
710484	2013 WS_{109}	—	November 28, 2013	La Silla	La Silla	VER	1.9 km	MPC · JPL
710485	2013 WZ_{114}	—	November 29, 2013	Haleakala	Pan-STARRS 1	·	1.1 km	MPC · JPL
710486	2013 WS_{120}	—	January 15, 2015	Haleakala	Pan-STARRS 1	EOS	1.7 km	MPC · JPL
710487	2013 WJ_{127}	—	November 26, 2013	Haleakala	Pan-STARRS 1	·	1.0 km	MPC · JPL
710488	2013 WX_{128}	—	November 27, 2013	Haleakala	Pan-STARRS 1	·	1.1 km	MPC · JPL
710489	2013 WT_{129}	—	November 28, 2013	Haleakala	Pan-STARRS 1	·	1.2 km	MPC · JPL
710490	2013 WN_{137}	—	November 29, 2013	Mount Lemmon	Mount Lemmon Survey	AGN	780 m	MPC · JPL
710491	2013 WO_{140}	—	November 27, 2013	Haleakala	Pan-STARRS 1	HOF	1.9 km	MPC · JPL
710492	2013 WD_{144}	—	November 27, 2013	Haleakala	Pan-STARRS 1	·	870 m	MPC · JPL
710493	2013 XQ_{2}	—	October 10, 2002	Palomar	NEAT	·	1.7 km	MPC · JPL
710494	2013 XX_{6}	—	December 3, 2013	Mauna Kea	D. J. Tholen, D. Farnocchia	VER	2.1 km	MPC · JPL
710495	2013 XM_{8}	—	December 5, 2013	Haleakala	Pan-STARRS 1	·	1.4 km	MPC · JPL
710496	2013 XG_{9}	—	October 31, 2013	Piszkéstető	K. Sárneczky	·	3.1 km	MPC · JPL
710497	2013 XV_{15}	—	November 28, 2013	Mount Lemmon	Mount Lemmon Survey	·	1.1 km	MPC · JPL
710498	2013 XB_{17}	—	October 26, 2009	Mount Lemmon	Mount Lemmon Survey	·	1.1 km	MPC · JPL
710499	2013 XV_{22}	—	November 28, 2013	Mount Lemmon	Mount Lemmon Survey	·	920 m	MPC · JPL
710500	2013 XE_{30}	—	December 3, 2013	Mount Lemmon	Mount Lemmon Survey	HNS	1 km	MPC · JPL

== 710501–710600 ==
back to top

Designation			Discovery			Properties		Ref
Permanent	Provisional	Named after	Date	Site	Discoverer(s)	Category	Diam.	Ref
710501	2013 XD_{32}	—	October 11, 2007	Catalina	CSS	·	3.2 km	MPC · JPL
710502	2013 XG_{32}	—	November 19, 2016	Mount Lemmon	Mount Lemmon Survey	·	670 m	MPC · JPL
710503	2013 XD_{35}	—	December 11, 2013	Haleakala	Pan-STARRS 1	·	1.5 km	MPC · JPL
710504	2013 XF_{36}	—	December 10, 2013	Mount Lemmon	Mount Lemmon Survey	·	870 m	MPC · JPL
710505	2013 XG_{36}	—	December 11, 2013	Mount Lemmon	Mount Lemmon Survey	·	1.5 km	MPC · JPL
710506	2013 XH_{37}	—	December 11, 2013	Haleakala	Pan-STARRS 1	·	1.0 km	MPC · JPL
710507	2013 XU_{37}	—	December 11, 2013	Haleakala	Pan-STARRS 1	·	620 m	MPC · JPL
710508	2013 XF_{39}	—	December 11, 2013	Haleakala	Pan-STARRS 1	·	1.4 km	MPC · JPL
710509	2013 XN_{40}	—	December 13, 2013	Mount Lemmon	Mount Lemmon Survey	H	550 m	MPC · JPL
710510	2013 XM_{42}	—	December 11, 2013	Haleakala	Pan-STARRS 1	·	890 m	MPC · JPL
710511	2013 YG_{1}	—	May 22, 2011	Mount Lemmon	Mount Lemmon Survey	EUN	1.1 km	MPC · JPL
710512	2013 YF_{4}	—	November 16, 2009	Mount Lemmon	Mount Lemmon Survey	·	1.1 km	MPC · JPL
710513	2013 YL_{4}	—	February 3, 2009	Mount Lemmon	Mount Lemmon Survey	·	2.5 km	MPC · JPL
710514	2013 YM_{13}	—	December 25, 2013	Mount Lemmon	Mount Lemmon Survey	·	1.7 km	MPC · JPL
710515	2013 YM_{15}	—	March 10, 2007	Mount Lemmon	Mount Lemmon Survey	NYS	1.0 km	MPC · JPL
710516	2013 YN_{16}	—	January 22, 2002	Kitt Peak	Spacewatch	·	910 m	MPC · JPL
710517	2013 YL_{17}	—	December 18, 2004	Mount Lemmon	Mount Lemmon Survey	·	1.7 km	MPC · JPL
710518	2013 YL_{18}	—	October 8, 2013	Mount Lemmon	Mount Lemmon Survey	·	2.7 km	MPC · JPL
710519	2013 YT_{18}	—	January 29, 2003	Apache Point	SDSS Collaboration	V	610 m	MPC · JPL
710520	2013 YY_{20}	—	December 26, 2013	Mount Lemmon	Mount Lemmon Survey	EUN	790 m	MPC · JPL
710521	2013 YS_{22}	—	August 21, 2009	La Sagra	OAM	MAS	610 m	MPC · JPL
710522	2013 YD_{24}	—	October 31, 2013	Kitt Peak	Spacewatch	VER	2.3 km	MPC · JPL
710523	2013 YV_{25}	—	November 27, 2013	Haleakala	Pan-STARRS 1	·	780 m	MPC · JPL
710524	2013 YY_{25}	—	November 26, 2013	Mount Lemmon	Mount Lemmon Survey	·	2.9 km	MPC · JPL
710525	2013 YP_{30}	—	December 24, 2013	Mount Lemmon	Mount Lemmon Survey	EUN	910 m	MPC · JPL
710526	2013 YW_{46}	—	September 25, 2012	Mount Lemmon	Mount Lemmon Survey	·	1.2 km	MPC · JPL
710527	2013 YE_{53}	—	November 28, 2013	Mount Lemmon	Mount Lemmon Survey	·	1.3 km	MPC · JPL
710528	2013 YL_{56}	—	November 28, 2013	Mount Lemmon	Mount Lemmon Survey	·	1.3 km	MPC · JPL
710529	2013 YQ_{56}	—	November 28, 2013	Mount Lemmon	Mount Lemmon Survey	·	1.0 km	MPC · JPL
710530	2013 YA_{64}	—	February 22, 2003	Kitt Peak	Spacewatch	·	2.7 km	MPC · JPL
710531	2013 YQ_{66}	—	October 31, 2013	Kitt Peak	Spacewatch	ADE	1.8 km	MPC · JPL
710532	2013 YT_{66}	—	October 28, 2013	Kitt Peak	Spacewatch	·	780 m	MPC · JPL
710533	2013 YZ_{66}	—	December 4, 2013	Haleakala	Pan-STARRS 1	·	1.1 km	MPC · JPL
710534	2013 YC_{67}	—	January 10, 2007	Kitt Peak	Spacewatch	·	990 m	MPC · JPL
710535	2013 YC_{68}	—	August 26, 2012	Haleakala	Pan-STARRS 1	·	980 m	MPC · JPL
710536	2013 YY_{69}	—	February 4, 2005	Kitt Peak	Spacewatch	·	1.9 km	MPC · JPL
710537	2013 YP_{71}	—	November 27, 2013	Haleakala	Pan-STARRS 1	·	1.1 km	MPC · JPL
710538	2013 YU_{71}	—	November 28, 2005	Kitt Peak	Spacewatch	·	1.1 km	MPC · JPL
710539	2013 YS_{72}	—	November 12, 2005	Kitt Peak	Spacewatch	MAS	670 m	MPC · JPL
710540	2013 YS_{82}	—	September 23, 2008	Mount Lemmon	Mount Lemmon Survey	·	1.6 km	MPC · JPL
710541	2013 YZ_{82}	—	May 1, 2011	Haleakala	Pan-STARRS 1	·	1.3 km	MPC · JPL
710542	2013 YG_{85}	—	December 28, 2013	Kitt Peak	Spacewatch	·	1.3 km	MPC · JPL
710543	2013 YY_{93}	—	July 16, 2004	Cerro Tololo	Deep Ecliptic Survey	·	1.0 km	MPC · JPL
710544	2013 YE_{101}	—	October 17, 2012	Mount Lemmon	Mount Lemmon Survey	·	1.8 km	MPC · JPL
710545	2013 YC_{102}	—	June 16, 2012	Haleakala	Pan-STARRS 1	PHO	1 km	MPC · JPL
710546	2013 YU_{104}	—	December 28, 2013	Mount Lemmon	Mount Lemmon Survey	·	1.5 km	MPC · JPL
710547	2013 YX_{104}	—	December 28, 2013	Kitt Peak	Spacewatch	·	1.0 km	MPC · JPL
710548	2013 YQ_{111}	—	December 29, 2013	Haleakala	Pan-STARRS 1	THB	2.8 km	MPC · JPL
710549	2013 YV_{114}	—	January 1, 2009	Mount Lemmon	Mount Lemmon Survey	·	1.5 km	MPC · JPL
710550	2013 YW_{121}	—	January 5, 2006	Kitt Peak	Spacewatch	·	1.1 km	MPC · JPL
710551	2013 YS_{122}	—	December 30, 2013	Haleakala	Pan-STARRS 1	·	1.3 km	MPC · JPL
710552	2013 YA_{129}	—	September 7, 2008	Dauban	F. Kugel, C. Rinner	ADE	1.7 km	MPC · JPL
710553	2013 YC_{129}	—	August 14, 2012	Haleakala	Pan-STARRS 1	·	1.2 km	MPC · JPL
710554	2013 YR_{130}	—	December 31, 2013	Mount Lemmon	Mount Lemmon Survey	·	1.2 km	MPC · JPL
710555	2013 YE_{131}	—	December 31, 2013	Mount Lemmon	Mount Lemmon Survey	·	900 m	MPC · JPL
710556	2013 YT_{132}	—	December 31, 2013	Mount Lemmon	Mount Lemmon Survey	·	960 m	MPC · JPL
710557	2013 YX_{134}	—	October 9, 2008	Kitt Peak	Spacewatch	·	1.2 km	MPC · JPL
710558	2013 YC_{137}	—	October 10, 2012	Haleakala	Pan-STARRS 1	·	1.9 km	MPC · JPL
710559	2013 YO_{137}	—	April 18, 2007	Kitt Peak	Spacewatch	·	1.2 km	MPC · JPL
710560	2013 YN_{141}	—	December 16, 2009	Mount Lemmon	Mount Lemmon Survey	·	850 m	MPC · JPL
710561	2013 YE_{143}	—	September 26, 2017	Haleakala	Pan-STARRS 1	·	1.4 km	MPC · JPL
710562	2013 YG_{143}	—	December 31, 2013	Mount Lemmon	Mount Lemmon Survey	·	1.2 km	MPC · JPL
710563	2013 YP_{144}	—	July 30, 2008	Mount Lemmon	Mount Lemmon Survey	·	1.8 km	MPC · JPL
710564	2013 YN_{146}	—	February 10, 2010	Kitt Peak	Spacewatch	·	1.3 km	MPC · JPL
710565	2013 YW_{148}	—	August 31, 2009	Siding Spring	SSS	·	1.2 km	MPC · JPL
710566	2013 YQ_{149}	—	October 20, 2006	Kitt Peak	Deep Ecliptic Survey	NYS	1.2 km	MPC · JPL
710567	2013 YV_{153}	—	December 19, 2009	Mount Lemmon	Mount Lemmon Survey	EUN	960 m	MPC · JPL
710568	2013 YT_{154}	—	December 31, 2013	Kitt Peak	Spacewatch	·	1.1 km	MPC · JPL
710569	2013 YR_{155}	—	December 24, 2013	Mount Lemmon	Mount Lemmon Survey	·	1.0 km	MPC · JPL
710570	2013 YS_{155}	—	April 9, 2015	Mount Lemmon	Mount Lemmon Survey	·	1.1 km	MPC · JPL
710571	2013 YK_{162}	—	December 25, 2013	Mount Lemmon	Mount Lemmon Survey	HYG	2.3 km	MPC · JPL
710572	2013 YS_{162}	—	December 31, 2013	Haleakala	Pan-STARRS 1	EOS	1.8 km	MPC · JPL
710573	2013 YU_{162}	—	December 25, 2013	Mount Lemmon	Mount Lemmon Survey	·	910 m	MPC · JPL
710574	2013 YG_{163}	—	October 8, 2012	Haleakala	Pan-STARRS 1	·	1.3 km	MPC · JPL
710575	2014 AD_{1}	—	January 1, 2014	Haleakala	Pan-STARRS 1	EUN	960 m	MPC · JPL
710576	2014 AC_{2}	—	January 1, 2014	Haleakala	Pan-STARRS 1	(5)	810 m	MPC · JPL
710577	2014 AA_{3}	—	December 18, 2007	Mount Lemmon	Mount Lemmon Survey	·	3.0 km	MPC · JPL
710578	2014 AU_{5}	—	November 20, 2009	Mount Lemmon	Mount Lemmon Survey	·	1.0 km	MPC · JPL
710579	2014 AG_{8}	—	January 1, 2014	Haleakala	Pan-STARRS 1	EUN	1.1 km	MPC · JPL
710580	2014 AM_{8}	—	January 1, 2014	Haleakala	Pan-STARRS 1	·	1.1 km	MPC · JPL
710581	2014 AN_{9}	—	August 29, 2009	La Sagra	OAM	MAS	720 m	MPC · JPL
710582	2014 AU_{9}	—	January 2, 2014	Kitt Peak	Spacewatch	·	920 m	MPC · JPL
710583	2014 AD_{13}	—	November 28, 2013	Haleakala	Pan-STARRS 1	HNS	1.0 km	MPC · JPL
710584	2014 AD_{14}	—	October 27, 2009	Kitt Peak	Spacewatch	·	830 m	MPC · JPL
710585	2014 AH_{15}	—	January 3, 2014	Mount Lemmon	Mount Lemmon Survey	PHO	770 m	MPC · JPL
710586	2014 AN_{17}	—	January 1, 2014	Kitt Peak	Spacewatch	·	1.1 km	MPC · JPL
710587	2014 AY_{21}	—	October 29, 2003	Kitt Peak	Spacewatch	DOR	2.5 km	MPC · JPL
710588	2014 AY_{23}	—	January 23, 2006	Kitt Peak	Spacewatch	·	1.2 km	MPC · JPL
710589	2014 AV_{26}	—	January 4, 2014	Mount Lemmon	Mount Lemmon Survey	PHO	1.0 km	MPC · JPL
710590	2014 AG_{34}	—	December 14, 2013	Mount Lemmon	Mount Lemmon Survey	·	1.6 km	MPC · JPL
710591	2014 AS_{34}	—	March 25, 2011	Kitt Peak	Spacewatch	MAS	650 m	MPC · JPL
710592	2014 AC_{35}	—	January 2, 2014	Mount Lemmon	Mount Lemmon Survey	·	1.0 km	MPC · JPL
710593	2014 AE_{38}	—	January 10, 2003	Palomar	NEAT	·	2.8 km	MPC · JPL
710594	2014 AP_{39}	—	December 24, 2013	Mount Lemmon	Mount Lemmon Survey	EUN	860 m	MPC · JPL
710595	2014 AX_{46}	—	January 5, 2014	Haleakala	Pan-STARRS 1	HNS	750 m	MPC · JPL
710596	2014 AQ_{48}	—	December 7, 2004	Socorro	LINEAR	JUN	930 m	MPC · JPL
710597	2014 AV_{50}	—	September 21, 2008	Mount Lemmon	Mount Lemmon Survey	·	1.1 km	MPC · JPL
710598	2014 AW_{50}	—	January 10, 2014	Mount Lemmon	Mount Lemmon Survey	·	1.3 km	MPC · JPL
710599	2014 AA_{51}	—	January 10, 2014	Mount Lemmon	Mount Lemmon Survey	·	1.5 km	MPC · JPL
710600	2014 AC_{55}	—	December 7, 2005	Kitt Peak	Spacewatch	MAS	660 m	MPC · JPL

== 710601–710700 ==
back to top

Designation			Discovery			Properties		Ref
Permanent	Provisional	Named after	Date	Site	Discoverer(s)	Category	Diam.	Ref
710601	2014 AO_{57}	—	January 10, 2014	Kitt Peak	Spacewatch	·	970 m	MPC · JPL
710602	2014 AP_{57}	—	March 26, 2003	Kitt Peak	Spacewatch	·	960 m	MPC · JPL
710603	2014 AH_{58}	—	January 1, 2014	Haleakala	Pan-STARRS 1	SYL	4.1 km	MPC · JPL
710604	2014 AO_{58}	—	January 1, 2014	Haleakala	Pan-STARRS 1	·	1.0 km	MPC · JPL
710605	2014 AJ_{59}	—	January 5, 2014	Kitt Peak	Spacewatch	·	2.6 km	MPC · JPL
710606	2014 AT_{60}	—	January 3, 2014	Mount Lemmon	Mount Lemmon Survey	·	1.6 km	MPC · JPL
710607	2014 AU_{61}	—	January 4, 2014	Mount Lemmon	Mount Lemmon Survey	·	1.4 km	MPC · JPL
710608	2014 AQ_{62}	—	July 7, 2016	Mount Lemmon	Mount Lemmon Survey	·	1.4 km	MPC · JPL
710609	2014 AU_{62}	—	July 7, 2016	Haleakala	Pan-STARRS 1	NYS	950 m	MPC · JPL
710610	2014 AA_{68}	—	January 2, 2014	Mount Lemmon	Mount Lemmon Survey	·	1.6 km	MPC · JPL
710611	2014 AJ_{68}	—	January 1, 2014	Haleakala	Pan-STARRS 1	·	1.2 km	MPC · JPL
710612	2014 AQ_{68}	—	October 18, 2012	Haleakala	Pan-STARRS 1	·	1.9 km	MPC · JPL
710613	2014 AJ_{69}	—	January 2, 2014	Mount Lemmon	Mount Lemmon Survey	·	1.9 km	MPC · JPL
710614	2014 AU_{70}	—	January 1, 2014	Mount Lemmon	Mount Lemmon Survey	·	1.3 km	MPC · JPL
710615	2014 AG_{73}	—	January 13, 2014	Mount Lemmon	Mount Lemmon Survey	EUN	940 m	MPC · JPL
710616	2014 AQ_{74}	—	January 1, 2014	Haleakala	Pan-STARRS 1	·	1.3 km	MPC · JPL
710617	2014 AR_{77}	—	January 9, 2014	Mount Lemmon	Mount Lemmon Survey	·	900 m	MPC · JPL
710618	2014 BG_{1}	—	September 23, 2008	Mount Lemmon	Mount Lemmon Survey	(5)	1.3 km	MPC · JPL
710619	2014 BV_{8}	—	September 12, 2004	Kitt Peak	Spacewatch	H	440 m	MPC · JPL
710620	2014 BV_{9}	—	January 19, 2014	Haleakala	Pan-STARRS 1	·	1.2 km	MPC · JPL
710621	2014 BT_{15}	—	January 23, 2014	Mount Lemmon	Mount Lemmon Survey	HOF	1.9 km	MPC · JPL
710622	2014 BR_{17}	—	January 1, 2014	Kitt Peak	Spacewatch	(5)	980 m	MPC · JPL
710623	2014 BO_{18}	—	January 21, 2014	Mount Lemmon	Mount Lemmon Survey	·	1.2 km	MPC · JPL
710624	2014 BA_{19}	—	July 9, 2005	Kitt Peak	Spacewatch	·	2.5 km	MPC · JPL
710625	2014 BB_{19}	—	February 1, 2005	Palomar	NEAT	·	1.8 km	MPC · JPL
710626	2014 BQ_{20}	—	January 23, 2014	Kitt Peak	Spacewatch	·	880 m	MPC · JPL
710627	2014 BB_{23}	—	January 10, 2014	Mount Lemmon	Mount Lemmon Survey	·	1.1 km	MPC · JPL
710628	2014 BL_{24}	—	December 21, 2008	Mount Lemmon	Mount Lemmon Survey	·	1.9 km	MPC · JPL
710629	2014 BQ_{24}	—	September 23, 2012	Nogales	M. Schwartz, P. R. Holvorcem	MAR	1.1 km	MPC · JPL
710630	2014 BD_{44}	—	December 27, 2013	Kitt Peak	Spacewatch	·	1.8 km	MPC · JPL
710631	2014 BC_{50}	—	December 26, 2006	Kitt Peak	Spacewatch	·	840 m	MPC · JPL
710632	2014 BY_{53}	—	December 2, 2008	Vail	Observatory, Jarnac	·	1.8 km	MPC · JPL
710633	2014 BU_{55}	—	January 10, 2014	Mount Lemmon	Mount Lemmon Survey	·	1.4 km	MPC · JPL
710634	2014 BT_{56}	—	January 28, 2014	Mount Lemmon	Mount Lemmon Survey	EOS	1.6 km	MPC · JPL
710635	2014 BY_{56}	—	January 28, 2014	Kitt Peak	Spacewatch	·	900 m	MPC · JPL
710636	2014 BA_{58}	—	January 1, 2014	Kitt Peak	Spacewatch	·	1.4 km	MPC · JPL
710637	2014 BW_{58}	—	January 23, 2014	Mount Lemmon	Mount Lemmon Survey	·	1.3 km	MPC · JPL
710638	2014 BK_{59}	—	January 29, 2014	Kitt Peak	Spacewatch	·	1.4 km	MPC · JPL
710639	2014 BT_{60}	—	January 29, 2014	Kitt Peak	Spacewatch	·	1.6 km	MPC · JPL
710640	2014 BA_{62}	—	January 28, 2014	Wildberg	R. Apitzsch	·	1.4 km	MPC · JPL
710641	2014 BH_{66}	—	January 24, 2014	Haleakala	Pan-STARRS 1	·	930 m	MPC · JPL
710642	2014 BX_{66}	—	April 12, 2010	Mount Lemmon	Mount Lemmon Survey	·	1.1 km	MPC · JPL
710643	2014 BP_{69}	—	May 5, 2002	Palomar	NEAT	·	1.2 km	MPC · JPL
710644	2014 BT_{70}	—	August 15, 2007	Črni Vrh	Skvarč, J.	·	1.8 km	MPC · JPL
710645	2014 BH_{73}	—	January 29, 2014	Catalina	CSS	·	1.3 km	MPC · JPL
710646	2014 BM_{73}	—	January 28, 2014	Catalina	CSS	EUN	1.0 km	MPC · JPL
710647	2014 BR_{73}	—	February 24, 2015	Haleakala	Pan-STARRS 1	·	1.7 km	MPC · JPL
710648	2014 BK_{76}	—	January 29, 2014	Kitt Peak	Spacewatch	EUN	950 m	MPC · JPL
710649	2014 BQ_{77}	—	January 29, 2014	Kitt Peak	Spacewatch	MRX	760 m	MPC · JPL
710650	2014 BX_{77}	—	January 24, 2014	Haleakala	Pan-STARRS 1	EOS	1.6 km	MPC · JPL
710651	2014 BQ_{81}	—	January 28, 2014	Mount Lemmon	Mount Lemmon Survey	HNS	840 m	MPC · JPL
710652	2014 BS_{82}	—	January 28, 2014	Kitt Peak	Spacewatch	L4	6.7 km	MPC · JPL
710653	2014 BU_{82}	—	January 24, 2014	Haleakala	Pan-STARRS 1	·	800 m	MPC · JPL
710654	2014 BE_{87}	—	January 25, 2014	Haleakala	Pan-STARRS 1	·	1.7 km	MPC · JPL
710655	2014 BJ_{89}	—	January 26, 2014	Haleakala	Pan-STARRS 1	·	550 m	MPC · JPL
710656	2014 BO_{91}	—	January 29, 2014	Kitt Peak	Spacewatch	·	910 m	MPC · JPL
710657	2014 CT_{1}	—	February 3, 2014	Elena Remote	Oreshko, A.	JUN	950 m	MPC · JPL
710658	2014 CT_{2}	—	January 29, 2014	Kitt Peak	Spacewatch	EOS	1.8 km	MPC · JPL
710659	2014 CJ_{4}	—	January 25, 2014	Haleakala	Pan-STARRS 1	·	1.2 km	MPC · JPL
710660	2014 CG_{10}	—	January 24, 2014	Haleakala	Pan-STARRS 1	·	1.3 km	MPC · JPL
710661	2014 CR_{12}	—	October 18, 2012	Haleakala	Pan-STARRS 1	·	1.0 km	MPC · JPL
710662	2014 CY_{15}	—	August 23, 2003	Palomar	NEAT	·	2.0 km	MPC · JPL
710663	2014 CW_{17}	—	August 26, 2003	Cerro Tololo	Deep Ecliptic Survey	MAR	1.1 km	MPC · JPL
710664	2014 CZ_{17}	—	March 12, 2002	Kitt Peak	Spacewatch	·	940 m	MPC · JPL
710665	2014 CN_{20}	—	January 28, 2014	Mayhill-ISON	L. Elenin	·	1.4 km	MPC · JPL
710666	2014 CG_{22}	—	February 16, 2010	Catalina	CSS	·	960 m	MPC · JPL
710667	2014 CL_{23}	—	April 7, 2003	Kitt Peak	Spacewatch	·	920 m	MPC · JPL
710668	2014 CT_{25}	—	February 9, 2014	Kitt Peak	Spacewatch	HNS	1.1 km	MPC · JPL
710669	2014 CG_{27}	—	February 10, 2014	Haleakala	Pan-STARRS 1	EUN	1.2 km	MPC · JPL
710670	2014 CQ_{27}	—	February 17, 2010	Kitt Peak	Spacewatch	·	1.3 km	MPC · JPL
710671	2014 CZ_{27}	—	February 11, 2014	Mount Lemmon	Mount Lemmon Survey	·	1.9 km	MPC · JPL
710672	2014 CL_{28}	—	February 10, 2014	Haleakala	Pan-STARRS 1	·	1.7 km	MPC · JPL
710673	2014 CW_{28}	—	April 26, 2007	Mount Lemmon	Mount Lemmon Survey	·	1.4 km	MPC · JPL
710674	2014 CB_{30}	—	October 7, 2016	Haleakala	Pan-STARRS 1	·	2.0 km	MPC · JPL
710675	2014 CP_{32}	—	February 6, 2014	Mount Lemmon	Mount Lemmon Survey	·	1.4 km	MPC · JPL
710676	2014 CH_{34}	—	February 10, 2014	Haleakala	Pan-STARRS 1	·	500 m	MPC · JPL
710677	2014 CG_{36}	—	February 9, 2014	Mount Lemmon	Mount Lemmon Survey	·	790 m	MPC · JPL
710678	2014 DC_{1}	—	October 8, 2012	Haleakala	Pan-STARRS 1	·	1.7 km	MPC · JPL
710679	2014 DJ_{3}	—	October 19, 2012	Mount Lemmon	Mount Lemmon Survey	·	1.5 km	MPC · JPL
710680	2014 DW_{5}	—	December 2, 2008	Kitt Peak	Spacewatch	·	1.2 km	MPC · JPL
710681	2014 DP_{10}	—	January 28, 2014	Mount Lemmon	Mount Lemmon Survey	HNS	1.1 km	MPC · JPL
710682	2014 DX_{12}	—	February 20, 2014	Haleakala	Pan-STARRS 1	·	1.7 km	MPC · JPL
710683	2014 DF_{13}	—	March 29, 2009	Kitt Peak	Spacewatch	·	2.4 km	MPC · JPL
710684	2014 DK_{16}	—	January 10, 2014	Mount Lemmon	Mount Lemmon Survey	·	1.4 km	MPC · JPL
710685	2014 DZ_{16}	—	February 22, 2014	Mount Lemmon	Mount Lemmon Survey	·	2.1 km	MPC · JPL
710686	2014 DS_{17}	—	February 10, 2014	Mount Lemmon	Mount Lemmon Survey	·	2.0 km	MPC · JPL
710687	2014 DE_{19}	—	September 19, 2003	Kitt Peak	Spacewatch	·	1.9 km	MPC · JPL
710688	2014 DB_{20}	—	February 22, 2014	Kitt Peak	Spacewatch	·	1.1 km	MPC · JPL
710689	2014 DA_{23}	—	February 17, 2001	Haleakala	NEAT	BAR	1.1 km	MPC · JPL
710690	2014 DM_{26}	—	February 20, 2014	Kitt Peak	Spacewatch	·	850 m	MPC · JPL
710691	2014 DC_{36}	—	October 18, 2012	Mount Lemmon	Mount Lemmon Survey	·	1.3 km	MPC · JPL
710692	2014 DD_{39}	—	April 22, 2007	Kitt Peak	Spacewatch	NYS	910 m	MPC · JPL
710693	2014 DF_{39}	—	February 9, 2014	Mount Lemmon	Mount Lemmon Survey	·	1.4 km	MPC · JPL
710694	2014 DO_{40}	—	February 10, 2014	Haleakala	Pan-STARRS 1	HNS	970 m	MPC · JPL
710695	2014 DN_{48}	—	February 27, 2014	Kitt Peak	Spacewatch	·	2.5 km	MPC · JPL
710696	2014 DX_{50}	—	October 20, 2012	Mount Lemmon	Mount Lemmon Survey	·	1.3 km	MPC · JPL
710697	2014 DF_{53}	—	April 4, 2005	Mount Lemmon	Mount Lemmon Survey	AEO	1.0 km	MPC · JPL
710698	2014 DJ_{58}	—	October 18, 2007	Kitt Peak	Spacewatch	·	1.5 km	MPC · JPL
710699	2014 DQ_{59}	—	October 19, 1995	Kitt Peak	Spacewatch	·	1.4 km	MPC · JPL
710700	2014 DB_{62}	—	January 2, 2009	Kitt Peak	Spacewatch	·	1.4 km	MPC · JPL

== 710701–710800 ==
back to top

Designation			Discovery			Properties		Ref
Permanent	Provisional	Named after	Date	Site	Discoverer(s)	Category	Diam.	Ref
710701	2014 DE_{62}	—	August 10, 2007	Kitt Peak	Spacewatch	·	990 m	MPC · JPL
710702	2014 DB_{63}	—	September 4, 2008	Kitt Peak	Spacewatch	·	1.2 km	MPC · JPL
710703	2014 DQ_{65}	—	February 26, 2014	Haleakala	Pan-STARRS 1	·	1.3 km	MPC · JPL
710704	2014 DD_{66}	—	March 17, 2005	Mount Lemmon	Mount Lemmon Survey	·	2.0 km	MPC · JPL
710705	2014 DQ_{66}	—	February 26, 2014	Haleakala	Pan-STARRS 1	HNS	830 m	MPC · JPL
710706	2014 DA_{69}	—	August 27, 2011	Haleakala	Pan-STARRS 1	·	1.4 km	MPC · JPL
710707	2014 DK_{72}	—	September 26, 2011	Haleakala	Pan-STARRS 1	·	2.7 km	MPC · JPL
710708	2014 DC_{77}	—	February 6, 2013	Nogales	M. Schwartz, P. R. Holvorcem	L4	8.6 km	MPC · JPL
710709	2014 DV_{77}	—	February 26, 2014	Haleakala	Pan-STARRS 1	·	570 m	MPC · JPL
710710	2014 DZ_{81}	—	April 5, 2003	Kitt Peak	Spacewatch	NYS	1.1 km	MPC · JPL
710711	2014 DW_{82}	—	February 24, 2014	Haleakala	Pan-STARRS 1	·	1.3 km	MPC · JPL
710712	2014 DG_{89}	—	April 1, 2005	Kitt Peak	Spacewatch	·	1.6 km	MPC · JPL
710713	2014 DZ_{91}	—	September 4, 2007	Mount Lemmon	Mount Lemmon Survey	·	1.3 km	MPC · JPL
710714	2014 DO_{93}	—	February 26, 2014	Mount Lemmon	Mount Lemmon Survey	·	1.5 km	MPC · JPL
710715	2014 DS_{96}	—	October 9, 2007	Mount Lemmon	Mount Lemmon Survey	·	1.6 km	MPC · JPL
710716	2014 DZ_{98}	—	September 6, 2008	Mount Lemmon	Mount Lemmon Survey	·	1.2 km	MPC · JPL
710717	2014 DK_{100}	—	February 3, 2009	Kitt Peak	Spacewatch	EOS	1.5 km	MPC · JPL
710718	2014 DD_{102}	—	January 23, 2014	Mount Lemmon	Mount Lemmon Survey	·	2.1 km	MPC · JPL
710719	2014 DE_{102}	—	November 20, 2009	Kitt Peak	Spacewatch	MAS	570 m	MPC · JPL
710720	2014 DU_{104}	—	February 27, 2009	Mount Lemmon	Mount Lemmon Survey	TRE	1.9 km	MPC · JPL
710721	2014 DR_{105}	—	February 27, 2014	Mount Lemmon	Mount Lemmon Survey	·	1.4 km	MPC · JPL
710722	2014 DJ_{109}	—	April 9, 2010	Mount Lemmon	Mount Lemmon Survey	EUN	1.0 km	MPC · JPL
710723	2014 DN_{110}	—	February 27, 2014	Haleakala	Pan-STARRS 1	·	1.5 km	MPC · JPL
710724	2014 DK_{116}	—	October 12, 2016	Haleakala	Pan-STARRS 1	·	1.6 km	MPC · JPL
710725	2014 DH_{121}	—	February 28, 2014	Haleakala	Pan-STARRS 1	L4	6.0 km	MPC · JPL
710726	2014 DJ_{125}	—	August 31, 1998	Kitt Peak	Spacewatch	·	1.9 km	MPC · JPL
710727	2014 DG_{129}	—	October 2, 2003	Kitt Peak	Spacewatch	·	1.5 km	MPC · JPL
710728	2014 DX_{132}	—	February 27, 2008	Kitt Peak	Spacewatch	HYG	2.4 km	MPC · JPL
710729	2014 DN_{134}	—	August 24, 2011	Haleakala	Pan-STARRS 1	KON	2.0 km	MPC · JPL
710730	2014 DV_{134}	—	October 7, 2012	Haleakala	Pan-STARRS 1	·	970 m	MPC · JPL
710731	2014 DZ_{134}	—	February 28, 2014	Haleakala	Pan-STARRS 1	·	1.3 km	MPC · JPL
710732	2014 DH_{136}	—	October 13, 2007	Mount Lemmon	Mount Lemmon Survey	·	1.3 km	MPC · JPL
710733	2014 DK_{142}	—	March 8, 2005	Kitt Peak	Spacewatch	·	1.6 km	MPC · JPL
710734	2014 DC_{144}	—	August 2, 2016	Haleakala	Pan-STARRS 1	3:2	4.0 km	MPC · JPL
710735	2014 DW_{145}	—	February 26, 2014	Haleakala	Pan-STARRS 1	·	1.4 km	MPC · JPL
710736	2014 DZ_{145}	—	February 28, 2014	Haleakala	Pan-STARRS 1	·	1.5 km	MPC · JPL
710737	2014 DQ_{148}	—	September 18, 2011	Mount Lemmon	Mount Lemmon Survey	·	1.9 km	MPC · JPL
710738	2014 DD_{149}	—	February 25, 2014	Kitt Peak	Spacewatch	·	1.8 km	MPC · JPL
710739	2014 DF_{150}	—	February 24, 2014	Haleakala	Pan-STARRS 1	·	1.7 km	MPC · JPL
710740	2014 DP_{151}	—	February 26, 2014	Haleakala	Pan-STARRS 1	·	770 m	MPC · JPL
710741	2014 DE_{154}	—	February 28, 2014	Haleakala	Pan-STARRS 1	·	1.2 km	MPC · JPL
710742	2014 DA_{155}	—	February 28, 2014	Haleakala	Pan-STARRS 1	·	2.1 km	MPC · JPL
710743	2014 DD_{155}	—	December 29, 2008	Sandlot	G. Hug	EUN	1.0 km	MPC · JPL
710744	2014 DA_{156}	—	June 13, 2007	Kitt Peak	Spacewatch	·	1.1 km	MPC · JPL
710745	2014 DK_{156}	—	March 21, 2015	Haleakala	Pan-STARRS 1	·	1.1 km	MPC · JPL
710746	2014 DY_{156}	—	February 26, 2014	Haleakala	Pan-STARRS 1	·	1.6 km	MPC · JPL
710747	2014 DA_{157}	—	August 1, 2016	Haleakala	Pan-STARRS 1	·	980 m	MPC · JPL
710748	2014 DN_{157}	—	August 1, 2016	Haleakala	Pan-STARRS 1	MAR	760 m	MPC · JPL
710749	2014 DP_{157}	—	May 21, 2015	Haleakala	Pan-STARRS 1	·	1.7 km	MPC · JPL
710750	2014 DV_{166}	—	February 21, 2014	Kitt Peak	Spacewatch	·	1.1 km	MPC · JPL
710751	2014 DO_{167}	—	February 28, 2014	Haleakala	Pan-STARRS 1	·	1.1 km	MPC · JPL
710752	2014 DV_{167}	—	February 26, 2014	Haleakala	Pan-STARRS 1	·	1.1 km	MPC · JPL
710753	2014 DU_{168}	—	February 28, 2014	Haleakala	Pan-STARRS 1	·	1.4 km	MPC · JPL
710754	2014 DX_{168}	—	February 26, 2014	Haleakala	Pan-STARRS 1	·	510 m	MPC · JPL
710755	2014 DY_{168}	—	February 22, 2014	Mount Lemmon	Mount Lemmon Survey	·	900 m	MPC · JPL
710756	2014 DE_{169}	—	February 26, 2014	Haleakala	Pan-STARRS 1	·	2.2 km	MPC · JPL
710757	2014 DV_{169}	—	February 26, 2014	Haleakala	Pan-STARRS 1	·	1.2 km	MPC · JPL
710758	2014 DL_{171}	—	February 18, 2014	Mount Lemmon	Mount Lemmon Survey	·	560 m	MPC · JPL
710759	2014 DZ_{173}	—	February 26, 2014	Haleakala	Pan-STARRS 1	AGN	1.1 km	MPC · JPL
710760	2014 DA_{174}	—	February 20, 2014	Mount Lemmon	Mount Lemmon Survey	·	1.5 km	MPC · JPL
710761	2014 DB_{174}	—	February 28, 2014	Haleakala	Pan-STARRS 1	·	1.8 km	MPC · JPL
710762	2014 DD_{174}	—	February 28, 2014	Haleakala	Pan-STARRS 1	·	1.1 km	MPC · JPL
710763	2014 DE_{174}	—	February 26, 2014	Haleakala	Pan-STARRS 1	HOF	2.2 km	MPC · JPL
710764	2014 DP_{175}	—	February 26, 2014	Haleakala	Pan-STARRS 1	HOF	1.8 km	MPC · JPL
710765	2014 DF_{176}	—	February 26, 2014	Haleakala	Pan-STARRS 1	·	1.4 km	MPC · JPL
710766	2014 DX_{176}	—	October 10, 2007	Mount Lemmon	Mount Lemmon Survey	·	1.5 km	MPC · JPL
710767	2014 DM_{177}	—	February 26, 2014	Mount Lemmon	Mount Lemmon Survey	L4	7.0 km	MPC · JPL
710768	2014 DJ_{178}	—	February 26, 2014	Haleakala	Pan-STARRS 1	·	1.0 km	MPC · JPL
710769	2014 DA_{179}	—	February 28, 2014	Haleakala	Pan-STARRS 1	·	1.4 km	MPC · JPL
710770	2014 DH_{181}	—	February 28, 2014	Haleakala	Pan-STARRS 1	L4	6.1 km	MPC · JPL
710771	2014 DW_{183}	—	February 28, 2014	Haleakala	Pan-STARRS 1	·	1.4 km	MPC · JPL
710772	2014 DU_{187}	—	February 28, 2014	Haleakala	Pan-STARRS 1	·	1.4 km	MPC · JPL
710773	2014 DC_{188}	—	February 28, 2014	Haleakala	Pan-STARRS 1	VER	2.0 km	MPC · JPL
710774	2014 DH_{190}	—	February 20, 2014	Mount Lemmon	Mount Lemmon Survey	·	1.3 km	MPC · JPL
710775	2014 DQ_{190}	—	February 26, 2014	Haleakala	Pan-STARRS 1	AGN	900 m	MPC · JPL
710776	2014 DP_{191}	—	February 18, 2014	Mount Lemmon	Mount Lemmon Survey	EUN	960 m	MPC · JPL
710777	2014 DZ_{191}	—	February 28, 2014	Haleakala	Pan-STARRS 1	·	2.4 km	MPC · JPL
710778	2014 DX_{196}	—	February 28, 2014	Haleakala	Pan-STARRS 1	AGN	890 m	MPC · JPL
710779	2014 DM_{197}	—	February 26, 2014	Haleakala	Pan-STARRS 1	·	540 m	MPC · JPL
710780	2014 EK	—	March 3, 2014	Oukaïmeden	M. Ory	·	2.2 km	MPC · JPL
710781	2014 EF_{6}	—	January 31, 2009	Mount Lemmon	Mount Lemmon Survey	·	1.5 km	MPC · JPL
710782	2014 ES_{6}	—	March 5, 2014	Haleakala	Pan-STARRS 1	·	1.6 km	MPC · JPL
710783	2014 EB_{8}	—	March 5, 2014	Haleakala	Pan-STARRS 1	V	600 m	MPC · JPL
710784	2014 EX_{14}	—	March 5, 2014	Haleakala	Pan-STARRS 1	L4	7.2 km	MPC · JPL
710785	2014 EK_{15}	—	March 5, 2014	Haleakala	Pan-STARRS 1	MAS	620 m	MPC · JPL
710786	2014 EC_{21}	—	March 6, 2014	Mount Lemmon	Mount Lemmon Survey	·	1.3 km	MPC · JPL
710787	2014 EN_{21}	—	March 8, 2014	Mount Lemmon	Mount Lemmon Survey	·	1.4 km	MPC · JPL
710788	2014 EN_{28}	—	January 23, 2014	Mount Lemmon	Mount Lemmon Survey	·	1.3 km	MPC · JPL
710789	2014 EB_{30}	—	April 16, 2005	Kitt Peak	Spacewatch	(13314)	1.9 km	MPC · JPL
710790	2014 EK_{34}	—	September 2, 2008	Kitt Peak	Spacewatch	·	1.5 km	MPC · JPL
710791	2014 EW_{34}	—	October 19, 2000	Kitt Peak	Spacewatch	·	1.6 km	MPC · JPL
710792	2014 EA_{35}	—	January 17, 2009	Mount Lemmon	Mount Lemmon Survey	·	1.4 km	MPC · JPL
710793	2014 ER_{35}	—	March 8, 2014	Mount Lemmon	Mount Lemmon Survey	·	1.8 km	MPC · JPL
710794	2014 ER_{36}	—	October 7, 2008	Mount Lemmon	Mount Lemmon Survey	·	990 m	MPC · JPL
710795	2014 EM_{40}	—	March 8, 2014	Mount Lemmon	Mount Lemmon Survey	(895)	2.8 km	MPC · JPL
710796	2014 EQ_{41}	—	February 26, 2014	Haleakala	Pan-STARRS 1	·	1.8 km	MPC · JPL
710797	2014 EC_{44}	—	November 3, 2007	Mount Lemmon	Mount Lemmon Survey	·	1.7 km	MPC · JPL
710798	2014 EF_{44}	—	April 2, 2005	Mount Lemmon	Mount Lemmon Survey	GAL	1.6 km	MPC · JPL
710799	2014 EC_{47}	—	September 6, 2008	Catalina	CSS	·	1.4 km	MPC · JPL
710800	2014 EF_{47}	—	October 11, 2001	Palomar	NEAT	·	1.2 km	MPC · JPL

== 710801–710900 ==
back to top

Designation			Discovery			Properties		Ref
Permanent	Provisional	Named after	Date	Site	Discoverer(s)	Category	Diam.	Ref
710801	2014 EQ_{47}	—	March 30, 2005	Catalina	CSS	·	1.8 km	MPC · JPL
710802	2014 ER_{51}	—	April 10, 2010	Mount Lemmon	Mount Lemmon Survey	EUN	1.2 km	MPC · JPL
710803	2014 EL_{61}	—	March 24, 2014	Haleakala	Pan-STARRS 1	·	1.3 km	MPC · JPL
710804	2014 EV_{65}	—	February 3, 2013	Haleakala	Pan-STARRS 1	L4	6.0 km	MPC · JPL
710805	2014 EV_{67}	—	October 29, 2010	Mount Lemmon	Mount Lemmon Survey	L4	6.0 km	MPC · JPL
710806	2014 EH_{69}	—	September 24, 2007	Kitt Peak	Spacewatch	·	1.4 km	MPC · JPL
710807	2014 EC_{71}	—	May 21, 2015	Haleakala	Pan-STARRS 1	·	1.1 km	MPC · JPL
710808	2014 EA_{73}	—	March 2, 2014	Cerro Tololo	DECam	·	1.1 km	MPC · JPL
710809	2014 EL_{73}	—	May 21, 2015	Haleakala	Pan-STARRS 1	EUN	820 m	MPC · JPL
710810	2014 EW_{79}	—	March 13, 2005	Mount Lemmon	Mount Lemmon Survey	·	1.2 km	MPC · JPL
710811	2014 EH_{80}	—	June 2, 2015	Cerro Tololo	DECam	NYS	970 m	MPC · JPL
710812	2014 EM_{84}	—	October 30, 2007	Mount Lemmon	Mount Lemmon Survey	·	1.5 km	MPC · JPL
710813	2014 EA_{90}	—	March 2, 2014	Cerro Tololo	DECam	·	1.6 km	MPC · JPL
710814	2014 EC_{90}	—	November 12, 2010	Kitt Peak	Spacewatch	L4	7.4 km	MPC · JPL
710815	2014 EU_{94}	—	September 27, 2009	Kitt Peak	Spacewatch	3:2	4.2 km	MPC · JPL
710816	2014 EP_{107}	—	September 26, 2011	Catalina	CSS	·	1.6 km	MPC · JPL
710817	2014 EL_{113}	—	November 9, 2007	Mount Lemmon	Mount Lemmon Survey	GEF	1.0 km	MPC · JPL
710818	2014 EL_{115}	—	February 28, 2014	Haleakala	Pan-STARRS 1	EOS	1.2 km	MPC · JPL
710819	2014 ED_{121}	—	July 14, 2016	Haleakala	Pan-STARRS 1	KOR	1 km	MPC · JPL
710820	2014 EY_{122}	—	February 22, 2014	Haleakala	Pan-STARRS 1	·	1.1 km	MPC · JPL
710821	2014 EW_{131}	—	December 22, 2008	Kitt Peak	Spacewatch	·	1.5 km	MPC · JPL
710822	2014 EL_{138}	—	December 4, 2012	Mount Lemmon	Mount Lemmon Survey	·	1.8 km	MPC · JPL
710823	2014 EN_{145}	—	February 28, 2014	Haleakala	Pan-STARRS 1	·	1.7 km	MPC · JPL
710824	2014 EH_{149}	—	April 11, 2010	Mount Lemmon	Mount Lemmon Survey	·	1.3 km	MPC · JPL
710825	2014 EE_{151}	—	October 24, 2016	Mount Lemmon	Mount Lemmon Survey	EUN	930 m	MPC · JPL
710826	2014 EV_{155}	—	January 10, 2013	Haleakala	Pan-STARRS 1	L4	6.3 km	MPC · JPL
710827	2014 EW_{156}	—	June 18, 2015	Haleakala	Pan-STARRS 1	MRX	590 m	MPC · JPL
710828	2014 EC_{160}	—	June 26, 2011	Mount Lemmon	Mount Lemmon Survey	·	1.6 km	MPC · JPL
710829	2014 EZ_{165}	—	October 19, 2003	Kitt Peak	Spacewatch	·	1.4 km	MPC · JPL
710830	2014 EU_{175}	—	December 3, 2012	Mount Lemmon	Mount Lemmon Survey	·	1.4 km	MPC · JPL
710831	2014 EY_{176}	—	November 28, 2010	Mount Lemmon	Mount Lemmon Survey	L4	6.7 km	MPC · JPL
710832	2014 EV_{181}	—	October 15, 2007	Mount Lemmon	Mount Lemmon Survey	·	1.1 km	MPC · JPL
710833	2014 EU_{182}	—	October 22, 2012	Haleakala	Pan-STARRS 1	·	1.4 km	MPC · JPL
710834	2014 EJ_{183}	—	October 26, 2009	Mount Lemmon	Mount Lemmon Survey	L4	7.2 km	MPC · JPL
710835	2014 EO_{185}	—	August 29, 2011	Mayhill-ISON	L. Elenin	·	1.3 km	MPC · JPL
710836	2014 EB_{186}	—	November 18, 2016	Mount Lemmon	Mount Lemmon Survey	·	1.0 km	MPC · JPL
710837	2014 EV_{190}	—	March 4, 2014	Cerro Tololo	DECam	EOS	1.2 km	MPC · JPL
710838	2014 EZ_{194}	—	November 14, 2010	Kitt Peak	Spacewatch	L4	6.8 km	MPC · JPL
710839	2014 ES_{195}	—	December 29, 2008	Kitt Peak	Spacewatch	·	1.3 km	MPC · JPL
710840	2014 EK_{199}	—	February 28, 2014	Haleakala	Pan-STARRS 1	·	1.1 km	MPC · JPL
710841	2014 EA_{202}	—	August 14, 2016	Haleakala	Pan-STARRS 1	·	1.5 km	MPC · JPL
710842	2014 EE_{204}	—	August 23, 2003	Palomar	NEAT	·	1.3 km	MPC · JPL
710843	2014 EA_{208}	—	July 28, 2011	Haleakala	Pan-STARRS 1	·	1.5 km	MPC · JPL
710844	2014 EM_{209}	—	September 27, 2016	Mount Lemmon	Mount Lemmon Survey	·	2.1 km	MPC · JPL
710845	2014 ET_{219}	—	March 5, 2014	Cerro Tololo	DECam	L4	6.5 km	MPC · JPL
710846	2014 EZ_{222}	—	September 10, 2016	Mount Lemmon	Mount Lemmon Survey	·	1.2 km	MPC · JPL
710847	2014 EO_{226}	—	February 28, 2014	Haleakala	Pan-STARRS 1	·	1.3 km	MPC · JPL
710848	2014 EY_{227}	—	September 19, 2011	Haleakala	Pan-STARRS 1	EOS	1.8 km	MPC · JPL
710849	2014 EE_{228}	—	October 17, 2003	Apache Point	SDSS Collaboration	EUN	990 m	MPC · JPL
710850	2014 EJ_{229}	—	April 15, 2005	Catalina	CSS	·	1.9 km	MPC · JPL
710851	2014 EE_{230}	—	May 21, 2015	Haleakala	Pan-STARRS 1	KON	1.5 km	MPC · JPL
710852	2014 EK_{236}	—	October 25, 2011	Haleakala	Pan-STARRS 1	·	3.0 km	MPC · JPL
710853	2014 EQ_{243}	—	November 7, 2012	Kitt Peak	Spacewatch	·	1.6 km	MPC · JPL
710854	2014 EW_{247}	—	April 8, 2010	Kitt Peak	Spacewatch	·	1.2 km	MPC · JPL
710855	2014 EG_{249}	—	March 8, 2014	Mount Lemmon	Mount Lemmon Survey	·	1.6 km	MPC · JPL
710856	2014 EB_{250}	—	March 12, 2014	Mount Lemmon	Mount Lemmon Survey	·	2.0 km	MPC · JPL
710857	2014 EM_{250}	—	September 18, 1995	Kitt Peak	Spacewatch	EUN	1.1 km	MPC · JPL
710858	2014 EW_{252}	—	March 7, 2014	Mount Lemmon	Mount Lemmon Survey	·	1.3 km	MPC · JPL
710859	2014 EZ_{253}	—	March 5, 2014	Haleakala	Pan-STARRS 1	·	1.3 km	MPC · JPL
710860	2014 EC_{255}	—	March 7, 2014	Mount Lemmon	Mount Lemmon Survey	·	1.2 km	MPC · JPL
710861	2014 EE_{256}	—	March 11, 2014	Mount Lemmon	Mount Lemmon Survey	·	2.4 km	MPC · JPL
710862	2014 FX_{4}	—	November 10, 2004	Kitt Peak	Spacewatch	(5)	1.2 km	MPC · JPL
710863	2014 FG_{5}	—	November 8, 2010	Mount Lemmon	Mount Lemmon Survey	L4	6.3 km	MPC · JPL
710864	2014 FO_{7}	—	August 18, 2001	Palomar	NEAT	H	540 m	MPC · JPL
710865	2014 FX_{11}	—	March 20, 2014	Mount Lemmon	Mount Lemmon Survey	EUN	1.3 km	MPC · JPL
710866	2014 FM_{12}	—	January 20, 2009	Kitt Peak	Spacewatch	AGN	940 m	MPC · JPL
710867	2014 FR_{12}	—	September 4, 2011	Haleakala	Pan-STARRS 1	·	1.7 km	MPC · JPL
710868	2014 FC_{13}	—	May 17, 2010	Mount Lemmon	Mount Lemmon Survey	·	1.9 km	MPC · JPL
710869	2014 FW_{18}	—	March 23, 2014	Mount Lemmon	Mount Lemmon Survey	·	1.7 km	MPC · JPL
710870	2014 FQ_{19}	—	October 10, 2008	Mount Lemmon	Mount Lemmon Survey	·	1.2 km	MPC · JPL
710871	2014 FA_{20}	—	October 8, 2012	Kitt Peak	Spacewatch	·	1.7 km	MPC · JPL
710872	2014 FQ_{20}	—	October 31, 2008	Kitt Peak	Spacewatch	·	1.3 km	MPC · JPL
710873	2014 FV_{21}	—	February 28, 2014	Haleakala	Pan-STARRS 1	·	510 m	MPC · JPL
710874	2014 FK_{23}	—	August 30, 2011	Haleakala	Pan-STARRS 1	·	1.8 km	MPC · JPL
710875	2014 FF_{24}	—	May 7, 2010	Mount Lemmon	Mount Lemmon Survey	·	1.6 km	MPC · JPL
710876	2014 FH_{24}	—	August 31, 2011	Haleakala	Pan-STARRS 1	·	1.3 km	MPC · JPL
710877	2014 FJ_{24}	—	February 28, 2014	Haleakala	Pan-STARRS 1	·	1.6 km	MPC · JPL
710878	2014 FN_{24}	—	March 23, 2014	Mount Lemmon	Mount Lemmon Survey	VER	2.3 km	MPC · JPL
710879	2014 FN_{25}	—	March 3, 1997	Kitt Peak	Spacewatch	·	1.0 km	MPC · JPL
710880	2014 FP_{25}	—	September 2, 2011	Haleakala	Pan-STARRS 1	·	1.6 km	MPC · JPL
710881	2014 FK_{27}	—	January 18, 2008	Mount Lemmon	Mount Lemmon Survey	·	2.2 km	MPC · JPL
710882	2014 FF_{29}	—	March 14, 2011	Mount Lemmon	Mount Lemmon Survey	·	520 m	MPC · JPL
710883	2014 FU_{29}	—	March 11, 2014	Mount Lemmon	Mount Lemmon Survey	·	1.3 km	MPC · JPL
710884	2014 FY_{29}	—	April 13, 2011	Kitt Peak	Spacewatch	·	530 m	MPC · JPL
710885	2014 FX_{39}	—	October 16, 2009	Mount Lemmon	Mount Lemmon Survey	·	480 m	MPC · JPL
710886	2014 FO_{40}	—	May 11, 2010	Mount Lemmon	Mount Lemmon Survey	·	1.7 km	MPC · JPL
710887	2014 FO_{43}	—	February 26, 2014	Haleakala	Pan-STARRS 1	AGN	920 m	MPC · JPL
710888	2014 FP_{44}	—	March 24, 2014	Haleakala	Pan-STARRS 1	DOR	2.2 km	MPC · JPL
710889	2014 FL_{54}	—	March 28, 2014	Mount Lemmon	Mount Lemmon Survey	·	1.4 km	MPC · JPL
710890	2014 FM_{56}	—	March 26, 2014	Mount Lemmon	Mount Lemmon Survey	·	1.4 km	MPC · JPL
710891	2014 FQ_{56}	—	March 27, 2014	Haleakala	Pan-STARRS 1	·	880 m	MPC · JPL
710892	2014 FL_{68}	—	April 21, 2014	Catalina	CSS	EUN	1.2 km	MPC · JPL
710893	2014 FK_{74}	—	January 31, 2009	Mount Lemmon	Mount Lemmon Survey	·	1.5 km	MPC · JPL
710894	2014 FV_{74}	—	September 4, 2011	Haleakala	Pan-STARRS 1	·	1.7 km	MPC · JPL
710895	2014 FB_{75}	—	April 22, 1996	Kitt Peak	Spacewatch	·	1.8 km	MPC · JPL
710896	2014 FD_{75}	—	March 24, 2014	Haleakala	Pan-STARRS 1	EOS	1.6 km	MPC · JPL
710897	2014 FN_{76}	—	January 17, 2009	Kitt Peak	Spacewatch	·	1.9 km	MPC · JPL
710898	2014 FC_{77}	—	June 15, 2015	Haleakala	Pan-STARRS 1	·	1.4 km	MPC · JPL
710899	2014 FW_{80}	—	July 5, 2016	Haleakala	Pan-STARRS 1	·	1.0 km	MPC · JPL
710900	2014 FT_{81}	—	March 28, 2014	Mount Lemmon	Mount Lemmon Survey	·	490 m	MPC · JPL

== 710901–711000 ==
back to top

Designation			Discovery			Properties		Ref
Permanent	Provisional	Named after	Date	Site	Discoverer(s)	Category	Diam.	Ref
710901	2014 FB_{84}	—	March 23, 2014	Mount Lemmon	Mount Lemmon Survey	KON	1.9 km	MPC · JPL
710902	2014 FF_{85}	—	March 23, 2014	Mount Lemmon	Mount Lemmon Survey	·	1.2 km	MPC · JPL
710903	2014 FH_{85}	—	March 23, 2014	Mount Lemmon	Mount Lemmon Survey	·	590 m	MPC · JPL
710904	2014 FM_{87}	—	March 26, 2014	Mount Lemmon	Mount Lemmon Survey	EOS	1.8 km	MPC · JPL
710905	2014 FK_{92}	—	March 28, 2014	Kitt Peak	Spacewatch	·	400 m	MPC · JPL
710906	2014 GF_{4}	—	March 10, 2005	Mount Lemmon	Mount Lemmon Survey	·	1.4 km	MPC · JPL
710907	2014 GQ_{4}	—	May 23, 2006	Kitt Peak	Spacewatch	·	1.4 km	MPC · JPL
710908	2014 GV_{5}	—	April 1, 2014	Mount Lemmon	Mount Lemmon Survey	·	1.9 km	MPC · JPL
710909	2014 GK_{7}	—	April 1, 2014	Mount Lemmon	Mount Lemmon Survey	·	1.5 km	MPC · JPL
710910	2014 GO_{7}	—	January 21, 2009	Bergisch Gladbach	W. Bickel	·	1.8 km	MPC · JPL
710911	2014 GJ_{10}	—	March 13, 2014	Kitt Peak	Spacewatch	·	1.5 km	MPC · JPL
710912	2014 GV_{10}	—	January 11, 2014	Mount Lemmon	Mount Lemmon Survey	·	1.4 km	MPC · JPL
710913	2014 GL_{18}	—	September 26, 2011	Mount Lemmon	Mount Lemmon Survey	·	1.2 km	MPC · JPL
710914	2014 GT_{19}	—	February 14, 2005	Kitt Peak	Spacewatch	·	1.6 km	MPC · JPL
710915	2014 GX_{22}	—	January 31, 2009	Mount Lemmon	Mount Lemmon Survey	·	1.8 km	MPC · JPL
710916	2014 GP_{23}	—	May 8, 2010	Mount Lemmon	Mount Lemmon Survey	·	1.2 km	MPC · JPL
710917	2014 GR_{23}	—	December 16, 2007	Kitt Peak	Spacewatch	MRX	940 m	MPC · JPL
710918	2014 GP_{25}	—	September 23, 2011	Kitt Peak	Spacewatch	·	1.6 km	MPC · JPL
710919	2014 GB_{26}	—	April 4, 2014	Kitt Peak	Spacewatch	·	1.3 km	MPC · JPL
710920	2014 GZ_{26}	—	February 27, 2014	Kitt Peak	Spacewatch	·	1.1 km	MPC · JPL
710921	2014 GH_{28}	—	April 3, 2009	Mount Lemmon	Mount Lemmon Survey	·	1.8 km	MPC · JPL
710922	2014 GU_{29}	—	December 23, 2012	Haleakala	Pan-STARRS 1	·	1.4 km	MPC · JPL
710923	2014 GK_{31}	—	November 11, 2004	Kitt Peak	Deep Ecliptic Survey	MAS	660 m	MPC · JPL
710924	2014 GL_{32}	—	April 4, 2014	Haleakala	Pan-STARRS 1	·	1.4 km	MPC · JPL
710925	2014 GJ_{33}	—	April 5, 2014	Haleakala	Pan-STARRS 1	·	1.8 km	MPC · JPL
710926	2014 GB_{42}	—	December 29, 2008	Kitt Peak	Spacewatch	·	1.1 km	MPC · JPL
710927	2014 GB_{51}	—	March 10, 2014	Mount Lemmon	Mount Lemmon Survey	·	1.6 km	MPC · JPL
710928	2014 GA_{52}	—	April 9, 2014	Haleakala	Pan-STARRS 1	·	1.8 km	MPC · JPL
710929	2014 GW_{56}	—	March 18, 2010	Kitt Peak	Spacewatch	·	1.3 km	MPC · JPL
710930	2014 GX_{56}	—	June 21, 2010	Mount Lemmon	Mount Lemmon Survey	·	1.5 km	MPC · JPL
710931	2014 GE_{57}	—	December 22, 2008	Kitt Peak	Spacewatch	·	890 m	MPC · JPL
710932	2014 GM_{58}	—	February 4, 2009	Mount Lemmon	Mount Lemmon Survey	·	2.0 km	MPC · JPL
710933	2014 GO_{58}	—	September 25, 2011	Haleakala	Pan-STARRS 1	·	910 m	MPC · JPL
710934	2014 GP_{58}	—	April 5, 2014	Haleakala	Pan-STARRS 1	·	1.5 km	MPC · JPL
710935	2014 GU_{58}	—	April 5, 2014	Haleakala	Pan-STARRS 1	THM	1.9 km	MPC · JPL
710936	2014 GK_{59}	—	April 5, 2014	Haleakala	Pan-STARRS 1	EUN	900 m	MPC · JPL
710937	2014 GM_{59}	—	September 13, 2007	Kitt Peak	Spacewatch	·	1.3 km	MPC · JPL
710938	2014 GD_{60}	—	April 4, 2014	Kitt Peak	Spacewatch	·	2.1 km	MPC · JPL
710939	2014 GD_{62}	—	January 17, 2013	Haleakala	Pan-STARRS 1	HOF	1.9 km	MPC · JPL
710940	2014 GK_{62}	—	April 5, 2014	Haleakala	Pan-STARRS 1	·	1.6 km	MPC · JPL
710941	2014 GA_{63}	—	August 24, 2011	Haleakala	Pan-STARRS 1	·	1.2 km	MPC · JPL
710942	2014 GX_{64}	—	April 4, 2014	Haleakala	Pan-STARRS 1	·	1.4 km	MPC · JPL
710943	2014 GE_{65}	—	December 20, 1995	Kitt Peak	Spacewatch	ADE	1.5 km	MPC · JPL
710944	2014 GQ_{72}	—	May 21, 2015	Haleakala	Pan-STARRS 1	T_{j} (2.95) · 3:2	5.0 km	MPC · JPL
710945	2014 GM_{74}	—	April 5, 2014	Haleakala	Pan-STARRS 1	·	1.5 km	MPC · JPL
710946	2014 GC_{79}	—	April 4, 2014	Kitt Peak	Spacewatch	·	1.5 km	MPC · JPL
710947	2014 GH_{81}	—	April 7, 2014	Mount Lemmon	Mount Lemmon Survey	·	1.7 km	MPC · JPL
710948	2014 GQ_{84}	—	February 14, 2013	Kitt Peak	Spacewatch	3:2	4.5 km	MPC · JPL
710949	2014 GA_{87}	—	April 4, 2014	Haleakala	Pan-STARRS 1	·	530 m	MPC · JPL
710950	2014 GG_{93}	—	April 5, 2014	Haleakala	Pan-STARRS 1	EOS	1.3 km	MPC · JPL
710951	2014 HC_{3}	—	March 27, 2014	Haleakala	Pan-STARRS 1	H	410 m	MPC · JPL
710952	2014 HD_{4}	—	October 5, 2005	Mount Lemmon	Mount Lemmon Survey	·	590 m	MPC · JPL
710953	2014 HY_{6}	—	January 17, 2009	Kitt Peak	Spacewatch	·	1.8 km	MPC · JPL
710954	2014 HD_{9}	—	April 20, 2014	Mount Lemmon	Mount Lemmon Survey	·	470 m	MPC · JPL
710955	2014 HF_{9}	—	November 1, 2011	ESA OGS	ESA OGS	·	1.7 km	MPC · JPL
710956	2014 HR_{10}	—	February 21, 2009	Kitt Peak	Spacewatch	·	1.8 km	MPC · JPL
710957	2014 HK_{11}	—	April 18, 1996	Kitt Peak	Spacewatch	·	1.7 km	MPC · JPL
710958	2014 HB_{13}	—	April 12, 2005	Kitt Peak	Spacewatch	·	1.9 km	MPC · JPL
710959	2014 HN_{16}	—	April 5, 2014	Haleakala	Pan-STARRS 1	·	1.4 km	MPC · JPL
710960	2014 HO_{17}	—	April 4, 2014	Kitt Peak	Spacewatch	·	1.1 km	MPC · JPL
710961	2014 HG_{18}	—	December 17, 2012	Kislovodsk	V. Nevski, E. Romas	·	1.5 km	MPC · JPL
710962	2014 HG_{20}	—	June 18, 2005	Mount Lemmon	Mount Lemmon Survey	·	890 m	MPC · JPL
710963	2014 HH_{22}	—	June 2, 2010	Nogales	M. Schwartz, P. R. Holvorcem	·	1.2 km	MPC · JPL
710964	2014 HT_{23}	—	June 24, 2001	Kitt Peak	Spacewatch	·	1.2 km	MPC · JPL
710965	2014 HZ_{26}	—	April 23, 2014	Cerro Tololo	DECam	·	1.2 km	MPC · JPL
710966	2014 HP_{31}	—	September 30, 2010	Mount Lemmon	Mount Lemmon Survey	·	2.2 km	MPC · JPL
710967	2014 HC_{32}	—	April 5, 2014	Haleakala	Pan-STARRS 1	KOR	1 km	MPC · JPL
710968	2014 HX_{32}	—	April 18, 2007	Kitt Peak	Spacewatch	·	770 m	MPC · JPL
710969	2014 HU_{35}	—	January 17, 2013	Haleakala	Pan-STARRS 1	·	1.5 km	MPC · JPL
710970	2014 HY_{37}	—	April 24, 2014	Mount Lemmon	Mount Lemmon Survey	·	1.2 km	MPC · JPL
710971	2014 HE_{42}	—	December 7, 2012	Nogales	M. Schwartz, P. R. Holvorcem	MAR	990 m	MPC · JPL
710972	2014 HU_{42}	—	May 17, 2010	Mount Lemmon	Mount Lemmon Survey	·	1.2 km	MPC · JPL
710973	2014 HT_{43}	—	April 24, 2014	Mount Lemmon	Mount Lemmon Survey	·	1.4 km	MPC · JPL
710974	2014 HU_{43}	—	April 24, 2014	Mount Lemmon	Mount Lemmon Survey	·	1.0 km	MPC · JPL
710975	2014 HB_{45}	—	November 6, 2012	Mount Lemmon	Mount Lemmon Survey	·	820 m	MPC · JPL
710976	2014 HX_{46}	—	December 29, 2003	Kitt Peak	Spacewatch	·	1.5 km	MPC · JPL
710977	2014 HA_{50}	—	December 23, 2012	Haleakala	Pan-STARRS 1	·	1.3 km	MPC · JPL
710978	2014 HD_{53}	—	December 13, 2012	Nogales	M. Schwartz, P. R. Holvorcem	KON	2.3 km	MPC · JPL
710979	2014 HQ_{58}	—	April 23, 2014	Cerro Tololo	DECam	·	1.5 km	MPC · JPL
710980	2014 HF_{59}	—	April 24, 2014	Haleakala	Pan-STARRS 1	AGN	1.0 km	MPC · JPL
710981	2014 HY_{63}	—	April 24, 2014	Haleakala	Pan-STARRS 1	·	910 m	MPC · JPL
710982	2014 HN_{65}	—	April 23, 2014	Cerro Tololo	DECam	PHO	700 m	MPC · JPL
710983	2014 HO_{65}	—	February 20, 2009	Mount Lemmon	Mount Lemmon Survey	MRX	990 m	MPC · JPL
710984	2014 HO_{73}	—	September 23, 2011	Haleakala	Pan-STARRS 1	AGN	950 m	MPC · JPL
710985	2014 HE_{87}	—	April 23, 2014	Cerro Tololo	DECam	HYG	1.8 km	MPC · JPL
710986	2014 HB_{91}	—	April 23, 2014	Cerro Tololo	DECam	AGN	930 m	MPC · JPL
710987	2014 HV_{102}	—	November 7, 2007	Kitt Peak	Spacewatch	GEF	870 m	MPC · JPL
710988	2014 HA_{103}	—	September 26, 2011	Haleakala	Pan-STARRS 1	·	1.4 km	MPC · JPL
710989	2014 HZ_{104}	—	April 24, 2014	Mount Lemmon	Mount Lemmon Survey	AGN	840 m	MPC · JPL
710990	2014 HX_{106}	—	April 23, 2014	Cerro Tololo	DECam	EOS	1.3 km	MPC · JPL
710991	2014 HH_{110}	—	April 24, 2014	Mount Lemmon	Mount Lemmon Survey	·	1.6 km	MPC · JPL
710992	2014 HN_{110}	—	September 8, 2011	Kitt Peak	Spacewatch	·	1.3 km	MPC · JPL
710993	2014 HC_{115}	—	September 4, 2011	Haleakala	Pan-STARRS 1	·	1.6 km	MPC · JPL
710994	2014 HF_{117}	—	April 24, 2014	Mount Lemmon	Mount Lemmon Survey	·	930 m	MPC · JPL
710995	2014 HX_{121}	—	October 20, 2011	Mount Lemmon	Mount Lemmon Survey	·	1.3 km	MPC · JPL
710996	2014 HK_{127}	—	April 5, 2014	Haleakala	Pan-STARRS 1	·	460 m	MPC · JPL
710997	2014 HN_{133}	—	December 21, 2012	Mount Lemmon	Mount Lemmon Survey	AGN	900 m	MPC · JPL
710998	2014 HO_{134}	—	September 13, 2007	Mount Lemmon	Mount Lemmon Survey	·	1.2 km	MPC · JPL
710999	2014 HS_{134}	—	March 28, 2008	Mount Lemmon	Mount Lemmon Survey	·	2.5 km	MPC · JPL
711000	2014 HR_{137}	—	January 20, 2013	Kitt Peak	Spacewatch	·	1.6 km	MPC · JPL

back to top

== Meaning of names ==
As minor planet discoveries are confirmed, they are given a permanent number by the IAU's Minor Planet Center (MPC), and the discoverers can then submit names for them, following the IAU's naming conventions. The list below concerns those minor planets in the specified number-range that have received names, and explains the meanings of those names.

Official naming citations of newly named small Solar System bodies are approved and published in a bulletin by IAU's Working Group for Small Bodies Nomenclature (WGSBN). Before May 2021, citations were published in MPC's Minor Planet Circulars for many decades. Recent citations can also be found on the JPL Small-Body Database (SBDB). Until his death in 2016, German astronomer Lutz D. Schmadel compiled these citations into the Dictionary of Minor Planet Names (DMP) and regularly updated the collection.

Based on Paul Herget's The Names of the Minor Planets, Schmadel also researched the unclear origin of numerous asteroids, most of which had been named prior to World War II. This article incorporates text from this source, which is in the public domain: SBDB New namings may only be added to this list below after official publication as the preannouncement of names is condemned. The WGSBN publishes a comprehensive guideline for the naming rules of non-cometary small Solar System bodies.

Named minor planet	Provisional	This minor planet was named for...	Ref · Catalog
710231 Jávorkaágoston	2013 QW_{101}	Ágoston Jávorka, Slovak amateur astronomer and optician.	IAU · 710231
