= List of minor planets: 883001–884000 =

The following is a partial list of minor planets, running from minor-planet number 883001 through 884000, inclusive. The primary data for this and other partial lists is based on JPL's "Small-Body Orbital Elements" and data available from the Minor Planet Center. Critical list information is also provided by the MPC, unless otherwise specified from Lowell Observatory. A detailed description of the table's columns and additional sources are given on the main page including a complete list of every page in this series, and a statistical break-up on the dynamical classification of minor planets.

Also see the summary list of all named bodies in numerical and alphabetical order, and the corresponding naming citations for the number range of this particular list. New namings may only be added to this list after official publication, as the preannouncement of names is condemned by the Working Group for Small Bodies Nomenclature of the International Astronomical Union.

Near-Earth obj.	MBA (inner)	MBA (outer)	Centaur
Mars-crosser	MBA (middle)	Jupiter trojan	Trans-Neptunian obj.
Unclassified

== 883001–883100 ==
Designation			Discovery			Properties		Ref
Permanent	Provisional	Named after	Date	Site	Discoverer(s)	Category	Diam.	Ref
883001	2016 GS_{99}	—	August 26, 2012	Haleakala	Pan-STARRS 1	·	1.5 km	MPC · JPL
883002	2016 GL_{112}	—	May 10, 2005	Kitt Peak	Spacewatch	·	2.7 km	MPC · JPL
883003	2016 GC_{115}	—	March 2, 2016	Haleakala	Pan-STARRS 1	·	1.7 km	MPC · JPL
883004	2016 GV_{120}	—	November 18, 2008	Kitt Peak	Spacewatch	·	2.2 km	MPC · JPL
883005	2016 GG_{123}	—	March 18, 2016	Mount Lemmon	Mount Lemmon Survey	·	2.0 km	MPC · JPL
883006	2016 GQ_{135}	—	April 4, 2016	Mount Lemmon	Mount Lemmon Survey	H	330 m	MPC · JPL
883007	2016 GT_{135}	—	April 2, 2005	Kitt Peak	Spacewatch	LIX	2.4 km	MPC · JPL
883008	2016 GO_{141}	—	March 1, 2016	Mount Lemmon	Mount Lemmon Survey	TIR	1.6 km	MPC · JPL
883009	2016 GB_{148}	—	March 30, 2016	Cerro Paranal	Gaia Ground Based Optical Tracking	·	2.1 km	MPC · JPL
883010	2016 GO_{154}	—	January 8, 2016	Haleakala	Pan-STARRS 1	·	960 m	MPC · JPL
883011	2016 GC_{160}	—	March 10, 2016	Haleakala	Pan-STARRS 1	·	940 m	MPC · JPL
883012	2016 GQ_{164}	—	April 3, 2016	Haleakala	Pan-STARRS 1	·	2.4 km	MPC · JPL
883013	2016 GY_{169}	—	February 11, 2016	Haleakala	Pan-STARRS 1	·	2.2 km	MPC · JPL
883014	2016 GJ_{176}	—	February 11, 2016	Haleakala	Pan-STARRS 1	·	1.9 km	MPC · JPL
883015	2016 GA_{177}	—	March 13, 2016	Haleakala	Pan-STARRS 1	critical	1.1 km	MPC · JPL
883016	2016 GB_{190}	—	April 2, 2011	Haleakala	Pan-STARRS 1	H	300 m	MPC · JPL
883017	2016 GN_{190}	—	April 3, 2016	Haleakala	Pan-STARRS 1	·	1.2 km	MPC · JPL
883018	2016 GU_{198}	—	March 30, 2016	Haleakala	Pan-STARRS 1	·	2.5 km	MPC · JPL
883019	2016 GM_{200}	—	November 27, 2014	Kitt Peak	Spacewatch	·	1.4 km	MPC · JPL
883020	2016 GC_{201}	—	March 10, 2016	Haleakala	Pan-STARRS 1	·	1.3 km	MPC · JPL
883021	2016 GM_{213}	—	January 17, 2015	Haleakala	Pan-STARRS 1	·	1.8 km	MPC · JPL
883022	2016 GB_{217}	—	April 28, 2010	WISE	WISE	·	2.9 km	MPC · JPL
883023	2016 GP_{219}	—	November 24, 2014	Mount Lemmon	Mount Lemmon Survey	·	1.4 km	MPC · JPL
883024	2016 GU_{221}	—	March 19, 1996	Kitt Peak	Spacewatch	AMO	330 m	MPC · JPL
883025	2016 GR_{233}	—	May 27, 2008	Kitt Peak	Spacewatch	·	650 m	MPC · JPL
883026	2016 GZ_{237}	—	April 4, 2016	Haleakala	Pan-STARRS 1	·	1.2 km	MPC · JPL
883027	2016 GK_{241}	—	February 15, 2010	Catalina	CSS	T_{j} (2.99)	2.4 km	MPC · JPL
883028	2016 GH_{242}	—	February 28, 2008	Kitt Peak	Spacewatch	·	860 m	MPC · JPL
883029	2016 GV_{246}	—	February 10, 2016	Haleakala	Pan-STARRS 1	EUP	2.1 km	MPC · JPL
883030	2016 GQ_{250}	—	April 2, 2005	Mount Lemmon	Mount Lemmon Survey	·	2.5 km	MPC · JPL
883031	2016 GJ_{252}	—	October 23, 2014	Kitt Peak	Spacewatch	H	340 m	MPC · JPL
883032	2016 GY_{253}	—	November 17, 2014	Mount Lemmon	Mount Lemmon Survey	H	350 m	MPC · JPL
883033	2016 GH_{254}	—	April 9, 2016	Haleakala	Pan-STARRS 1	H	420 m	MPC · JPL
883034	2016 GP_{254}	—	March 2, 2016	Haleakala	Pan-STARRS 1	·	1.8 km	MPC · JPL
883035	2016 GA_{255}	—	May 8, 2005	Mount Lemmon	Mount Lemmon Survey	T_{j} (2.99)	2.2 km	MPC · JPL
883036	2016 GY_{256}	—	April 15, 2016	Haleakala	Pan-STARRS 1	·	810 m	MPC · JPL
883037	2016 GM_{268}	—	April 4, 2016	Haleakala	Pan-STARRS 1	PHO	840 m	MPC · JPL
883038	2016 GL_{270}	—	April 10, 2016	Haleakala	Pan-STARRS 1	·	2.3 km	MPC · JPL
883039	2016 GZ_{271}	—	April 9, 2016	Haleakala	Pan-STARRS 1	KON	1.5 km	MPC · JPL
883040	2016 GZ_{272}	—	April 1, 2016	Haleakala	Pan-STARRS 1	·	870 m	MPC · JPL
883041	2016 GE_{274}	—	April 1, 2016	Haleakala	Pan-STARRS 1	·	2.5 km	MPC · JPL
883042	2016 GL_{275}	—	July 1, 2017	Mount Lemmon	Mount Lemmon Survey	·	1.1 km	MPC · JPL
883043	2016 GM_{275}	—	April 3, 2016	Haleakala	Pan-STARRS 1	·	480 m	MPC · JPL
883044	2016 GV_{276}	—	April 15, 2016	Haleakala	Pan-STARRS 1	·	2.5 km	MPC · JPL
883045	2016 GM_{277}	—	April 3, 2016	Haleakala	Pan-STARRS 1	·	2.7 km	MPC · JPL
883046	2016 GY_{279}	—	April 2, 2016	Haleakala	Pan-STARRS 1	·	1.5 km	MPC · JPL
883047	2016 GB_{281}	—	April 6, 2016	Mount Lemmon	Mount Lemmon Survey	PHO	680 m	MPC · JPL
883048	2016 GU_{284}	—	April 15, 2016	Haleakala	Pan-STARRS 1	(5)	760 m	MPC · JPL
883049	2016 GW_{287}	—	April 11, 2016	Haleakala	Pan-STARRS 1	·	870 m	MPC · JPL
883050	2016 GQ_{288}	—	April 11, 2016	Haleakala	Pan-STARRS 1	·	2.0 km	MPC · JPL
883051	2016 GC_{295}	—	April 2, 2016	Mount Lemmon	Mount Lemmon Survey	·	2.2 km	MPC · JPL
883052	2016 GA_{296}	—	April 5, 2016	Haleakala	Pan-STARRS 1	·	1.6 km	MPC · JPL
883053	2016 GC_{296}	—	April 3, 2016	Haleakala	Pan-STARRS 1	·	1.8 km	MPC · JPL
883054	2016 GG_{297}	—	April 1, 2016	Haleakala	Pan-STARRS 1	·	2.0 km	MPC · JPL
883055	2016 GY_{299}	—	January 18, 2015	Mount Lemmon	Mount Lemmon Survey	EOS	1.3 km	MPC · JPL
883056	2016 GQ_{306}	—	April 2, 2016	Mount Lemmon	Mount Lemmon Survey	·	2.3 km	MPC · JPL
883057	2016 GC_{309}	—	April 11, 2016	Haleakala	Pan-STARRS 1	MAR	820 m	MPC · JPL
883058	2016 GE_{309}	—	April 10, 2016	Haleakala	Pan-STARRS 1	·	900 m	MPC · JPL
883059	2016 GG_{309}	—	April 4, 2016	Mount Lemmon	Mount Lemmon Survey	·	760 m	MPC · JPL
883060	2016 GD_{316}	—	January 27, 2015	Haleakala	Pan-STARRS 1	·	2.3 km	MPC · JPL
883061	2016 GF_{319}	—	April 2, 2016	Haleakala	Pan-STARRS 1	·	1.1 km	MPC · JPL
883062	2016 GD_{327}	—	November 9, 2013	Mount Lemmon	Mount Lemmon Survey	·	2.0 km	MPC · JPL
883063	2016 GQ_{330}	—	April 2, 2016	Haleakala	Pan-STARRS 1	(43176)	1.9 km	MPC · JPL
883064	2016 GF_{334}	—	April 1, 2016	Mount Lemmon	Mount Lemmon Survey	·	2.1 km	MPC · JPL
883065	2016 GC_{337}	—	April 3, 2016	Haleakala	Pan-STARRS 1	·	2.2 km	MPC · JPL
883066	2016 GF_{341}	—	April 10, 2016	Haleakala	Pan-STARRS 1	TIR	2.0 km	MPC · JPL
883067	2016 GP_{341}	—	April 9, 2016	Haleakala	Pan-STARRS 1	L4	6.7 km	MPC · JPL
883068	2016 GX_{341}	—	April 3, 2016	Haleakala	Pan-STARRS 1	HOF · critical	1.5 km	MPC · JPL
883069	2016 GX_{353}	—	April 3, 2016	Haleakala	Pan-STARRS 1	·	2.7 km	MPC · JPL
883070	2016 GL_{355}	—	April 3, 2016	Haleakala	Pan-STARRS 1	·	2.0 km	MPC · JPL
883071	2016 HJ	—	April 21, 2006	Mount Lemmon	Mount Lemmon Survey	H	530 m	MPC · JPL
883072	2016 HS_{3}	—	November 9, 2009	Mount Lemmon	Mount Lemmon Survey	H	510 m	MPC · JPL
883073	2016 HX_{3}	—	March 13, 2016	Haleakala	Pan-STARRS 1	AMO	190 m	MPC · JPL
883074	2016 HJ_{4}	—	March 4, 2016	Haleakala	Pan-STARRS 1	·	2.0 km	MPC · JPL
883075	2016 HE_{22}	—	March 16, 2009	Kitt Peak	Spacewatch	·	480 m	MPC · JPL
883076	2016 HG_{26}	—	April 16, 2016	Haleakala	Pan-STARRS 1	·	880 m	MPC · JPL
883077	2016 HK_{26}	—	April 16, 2016	Haleakala	Pan-STARRS 1	PHO	750 m	MPC · JPL
883078	2016 HV_{26}	—	April 17, 2016	Haleakala	Pan-STARRS 1	H	400 m	MPC · JPL
883079	2016 HS_{27}	—	October 21, 2008	Kitt Peak	Spacewatch	·	2.1 km	MPC · JPL
883080	2016 HB_{32}	—	January 16, 2015	Haleakala	Pan-STARRS 1	·	2.4 km	MPC · JPL
883081	2016 JE	—	May 1, 2016	Haleakala	Pan-STARRS 1	ATE	150 m	MPC · JPL
883082	2016 JZ	—	January 8, 2016	Haleakala	Pan-STARRS 1	·	1.7 km	MPC · JPL
883083	2016 JC_{1}	—	April 9, 2016	Haleakala	Pan-STARRS 1	·	1.4 km	MPC · JPL
883084	2016 JL_{2}	—	February 17, 2010	Kitt Peak	Spacewatch	·	2.1 km	MPC · JPL
883085	2016 JV_{2}	—	April 11, 2016	Haleakala	Pan-STARRS 1	H	340 m	MPC · JPL
883086	2016 JT_{8}	—	February 10, 2016	Haleakala	Pan-STARRS 1	·	960 m	MPC · JPL
883087	2016 JL_{26}	—	March 31, 2016	Haleakala	Pan-STARRS 1	·	680 m	MPC · JPL
883088	2016 JU_{33}	—	March 6, 2016	Haleakala	Pan-STARRS 1	APO · PHA	170 m	MPC · JPL
883089	2016 JA_{37}	—	March 5, 2016	Haleakala	Pan-STARRS 1	·	2.2 km	MPC · JPL
883090	2016 JQ_{37}	—	January 13, 2015	Haleakala	Pan-STARRS 1	·	2.0 km	MPC · JPL
883091	2016 JR_{37}	—	February 17, 2010	Kitt Peak	Spacewatch	TIR	1.9 km	MPC · JPL
883092	2016 JO_{40}	—	May 3, 2016	Haleakala	Pan-STARRS 1	·	1.1 km	MPC · JPL
883093	2016 JE_{41}	—	May 2, 2016	Haleakala	Pan-STARRS 1	T_{j} (2.94)	3.1 km	MPC · JPL
883094	2016 JY_{42}	—	May 2, 2016	Haleakala	Pan-STARRS 1	EUN	760 m	MPC · JPL
883095	2016 JH_{43}	—	May 3, 2016	Mount Lemmon	Mount Lemmon Survey	·	700 m	MPC · JPL
883096	2016 JL_{43}	—	September 10, 2007	Kitt Peak	Spacewatch	·	1.4 km	MPC · JPL
883097	2016 JC_{44}	—	May 6, 2016	Haleakala	Pan-STARRS 1	·	950 m	MPC · JPL
883098	2016 JF_{44}	—	May 13, 2016	Haleakala	Pan-STARRS 1	MAR	580 m	MPC · JPL
883099	2016 JA_{51}	—	May 6, 2016	Haleakala	Pan-STARRS 1	·	1.6 km	MPC · JPL
883100	2016 JH_{51}	—	May 13, 2016	Kitt Peak	Spacewatch	JUN	720 m	MPC · JPL

== 883101–883200 ==
back to top

Designation			Discovery			Properties		Ref
Permanent	Provisional	Named after	Date	Site	Discoverer(s)	Category	Diam.	Ref
883101	2016 JZ_{53}	—	May 5, 2016	Haleakala	Pan-STARRS 1	·	930 m	MPC · JPL
883102	2016 JM_{62}	—	May 1, 2016	Cerro Tololo	DECam	·	2.4 km	MPC · JPL
883103	2016 JE_{70}	—	May 1, 2016	Cerro Tololo	DECam	·	1.1 km	MPC · JPL
883104	2016 JO_{81}	—	May 1, 2016	Cerro Tololo	DECam	·	1.8 km	MPC · JPL
883105	2016 JG_{94}	—	May 1, 2016	Cerro Tololo	DECam	·	1.9 km	MPC · JPL
883106	2016 KN_{4}	—	May 27, 2016	Haleakala	Pan-STARRS 1	H	370 m	MPC · JPL
883107	2016 KJ_{6}	—	April 11, 2016	Haleakala	Pan-STARRS 1	·	900 m	MPC · JPL
883108	2016 KH_{10}	—	May 30, 2016	Haleakala	Pan-STARRS 1	·	1.3 km	MPC · JPL
883109	2016 KN_{10}	—	May 30, 2016	Haleakala	Pan-STARRS 1	(5)	760 m	MPC · JPL
883110	2016 KR_{10}	—	May 30, 2016	Haleakala	Pan-STARRS 1	EUN	710 m	MPC · JPL
883111	2016 KO_{11}	—	May 30, 2016	Haleakala	Pan-STARRS 1	·	730 m	MPC · JPL
883112	2016 KR_{11}	—	May 30, 2016	Haleakala	Pan-STARRS 1	BRG	960 m	MPC · JPL
883113	2016 KE_{14}	—	May 30, 2016	Haleakala	Pan-STARRS 1	·	820 m	MPC · JPL
883114	2016 LT_{4}	—	June 3, 2016	Mount Lemmon	Mount Lemmon Survey	·	1.0 km	MPC · JPL
883115	2016 LZ_{5}	—	June 3, 2016	Mount Lemmon	Mount Lemmon Survey	·	870 m	MPC · JPL
883116	2016 LF_{11}	—	June 7, 2016	Haleakala	Pan-STARRS 1	·	590 m	MPC · JPL
883117	2016 LS_{13}	—	May 2, 2016	Haleakala	Pan-STARRS 1	·	850 m	MPC · JPL
883118	2016 LO_{16}	—	April 15, 2016	Haleakala	Pan-STARRS 1	EUN	720 m	MPC · JPL
883119	2016 LP_{20}	—	June 5, 2016	Haleakala	Pan-STARRS 1	·	970 m	MPC · JPL
883120	2016 LS_{24}	—	June 5, 2016	Haleakala	Pan-STARRS 1	·	1.4 km	MPC · JPL
883121	2016 LE_{28}	—	May 30, 2016	Haleakala	Pan-STARRS 1	(194)	850 m	MPC · JPL
883122	2016 LN_{29}	—	January 26, 2010	WISE	WISE	·	3.2 km	MPC · JPL
883123	2016 LU_{31}	—	May 31, 2012	Mount Lemmon	Mount Lemmon Survey	·	660 m	MPC · JPL
883124	2016 LQ_{33}	—	June 5, 2016	Haleakala	Pan-STARRS 1	·	840 m	MPC · JPL
883125	2016 LE_{35}	—	October 25, 2013	Mount Lemmon	Mount Lemmon Survey	·	2.1 km	MPC · JPL
883126	2016 LF_{40}	—	June 5, 2016	Haleakala	Pan-STARRS 1	·	740 m	MPC · JPL
883127	2016 LM_{41}	—	June 5, 2016	Haleakala	Pan-STARRS 1	·	880 m	MPC · JPL
883128	2016 LZ_{42}	—	January 23, 2015	Haleakala	Pan-STARRS 1	·	950 m	MPC · JPL
883129	2016 LU_{43}	—	January 17, 2010	WISE	WISE	·	2.3 km	MPC · JPL
883130	2016 LW_{43}	—	June 7, 2016	Mount Lemmon	Mount Lemmon Survey	·	1.1 km	MPC · JPL
883131	2016 LA_{46}	—	June 7, 2016	Haleakala	Pan-STARRS 1	·	1.2 km	MPC · JPL
883132	2016 LC_{52}	—	June 5, 2016	Haleakala	Pan-STARRS 1	·	1.5 km	MPC · JPL
883133	2016 LD_{52}	—	August 30, 2005	Palomar	NEAT	T_{j} (2.94)	2.4 km	MPC · JPL
883134	2016 LF_{54}	—	June 5, 2016	Haleakala	Pan-STARRS 1	·	1.9 km	MPC · JPL
883135	2016 LS_{56}	—	February 23, 2015	Haleakala	Pan-STARRS 1	MAR	670 m	MPC · JPL
883136	2016 LG_{65}	—	June 2, 2016	Mount Lemmon	Mount Lemmon Survey	(1547)	1.1 km	MPC · JPL
883137	2016 LM_{68}	—	January 28, 2015	Haleakala	Pan-STARRS 1	MAR	840 m	MPC · JPL
883138	2016 LT_{68}	—	June 7, 2016	Haleakala	Pan-STARRS 1	·	3.4 km	MPC · JPL
883139	2016 LX_{68}	—	June 4, 2016	Haleakala	Pan-STARRS 1	·	790 m	MPC · JPL
883140	2016 LJ_{69}	—	June 7, 2016	Haleakala	Pan-STARRS 1	·	970 m	MPC · JPL
883141	2016 LN_{69}	—	June 8, 2016	Mount Lemmon	Mount Lemmon Survey	·	1.3 km	MPC · JPL
883142	2016 LU_{69}	—	June 7, 2016	Haleakala	Pan-STARRS 1	·	1.1 km	MPC · JPL
883143	2016 LO_{70}	—	June 7, 2016	Haleakala	Pan-STARRS 1	·	890 m	MPC · JPL
883144	2016 LT_{70}	—	June 7, 2016	Haleakala	Pan-STARRS 1	MAR	740 m	MPC · JPL
883145	2016 LY_{70}	—	June 5, 2016	Haleakala	Pan-STARRS 1	·	1.9 km	MPC · JPL
883146	2016 LZ_{71}	—	June 7, 2016	Haleakala	Pan-STARRS 1	·	940 m	MPC · JPL
883147	2016 LC_{72}	—	June 8, 2016	Haleakala	Pan-STARRS 1	·	910 m	MPC · JPL
883148	2016 LE_{72}	—	June 7, 2016	Haleakala	Pan-STARRS 1	·	1.0 km	MPC · JPL
883149	2016 LR_{72}	—	June 7, 2016	Haleakala	Pan-STARRS 1	·	980 m	MPC · JPL
883150	2016 LV_{73}	—	June 7, 2016	Haleakala	Pan-STARRS 1	·	1.1 km	MPC · JPL
883151	2016 LM_{74}	—	June 9, 2016	Haleakala	Pan-STARRS 1	·	790 m	MPC · JPL
883152	2016 LR_{75}	—	June 8, 2016	Haleakala	Pan-STARRS 1	TIR	2.4 km	MPC · JPL
883153	2016 LU_{75}	—	June 7, 2016	Haleakala	Pan-STARRS 1	·	1.3 km	MPC · JPL
883154	2016 LM_{76}	—	June 15, 2016	Mount Lemmon	Mount Lemmon Survey	·	930 m	MPC · JPL
883155	2016 LL_{77}	—	June 3, 2016	Mount Lemmon	Mount Lemmon Survey	EUN	760 m	MPC · JPL
883156	2016 LY_{77}	—	June 8, 2016	Haleakala	Pan-STARRS 1	·	1.0 km	MPC · JPL
883157	2016 LT_{78}	—	June 7, 2016	Haleakala	Pan-STARRS 1	·	1.1 km	MPC · JPL
883158	2016 LY_{78}	—	June 5, 2016	Haleakala	Pan-STARRS 1	JUN	520 m	MPC · JPL
883159	2016 LZ_{78}	—	June 8, 2016	Haleakala	Pan-STARRS 1	·	780 m	MPC · JPL
883160	2016 LH_{79}	—	June 2, 2016	Mount Lemmon	Mount Lemmon Survey	MAR	780 m	MPC · JPL
883161	2016 LV_{79}	—	June 7, 2016	Haleakala	Pan-STARRS 1	·	800 m	MPC · JPL
883162	2016 LW_{79}	—	June 7, 2016	Haleakala	Pan-STARRS 1	·	960 m	MPC · JPL
883163	2016 LS_{80}	—	June 5, 2016	Haleakala	Pan-STARRS 1	MAR	660 m	MPC · JPL
883164	2016 LY_{83}	—	June 9, 2016	Haleakala	Pan-STARRS 1	·	780 m	MPC · JPL
883165	2016 LJ_{84}	—	June 3, 2016	Mount Lemmon	Mount Lemmon Survey	·	1.3 km	MPC · JPL
883166	2016 LQ_{85}	—	June 12, 2016	Mount Lemmon	Mount Lemmon Survey	·	1.1 km	MPC · JPL
883167	2016 LX_{94}	—	June 8, 2016	Haleakala	Pan-STARRS 1	·	1.3 km	MPC · JPL
883168	2016 LF_{95}	—	June 13, 2016	Haleakala	Pan-STARRS 1	·	1.1 km	MPC · JPL
883169	2016 LN_{108}	—	June 5, 2016	Subaru Telescope,	Subaru Telescope	·	1.5 km	MPC · JPL
883170	2016 LR_{108}	—	June 1, 2016	Subaru Telescope,	Subaru Telescope	·	1.6 km	MPC · JPL
883171	2016 LT_{109}	—	June 7, 2016	Haleakala	Pan-STARRS 1	·	1.2 km	MPC · JPL
883172	2016 LV_{109}	—	July 22, 2012	Zelenchukskaya Stn	T. V. Krjačko, Satovski, B.	·	800 m	MPC · JPL
883173	2016 MS_{2}	—	June 8, 2016	Haleakala	Pan-STARRS 1	·	700 m	MPC · JPL
883174	2016 MN_{5}	—	June 29, 2016	Haleakala	Pan-STARRS 1	H	480 m	MPC · JPL
883175	2016 MB_{6}	—	June 29, 2016	Haleakala	Pan-STARRS 1	·	880 m	MPC · JPL
883176	2016 NR_{10}	—	August 12, 2012	Haleakala	Pan-STARRS 1	(194)	1.1 km	MPC · JPL
883177	2016 NA_{14}	—	October 18, 2012	Haleakala	Pan-STARRS 1	(1547)	1.0 km	MPC · JPL
883178	2016 NP_{19}	—	July 5, 2016	Haleakala	Pan-STARRS 1	·	1.1 km	MPC · JPL
883179	2016 NC_{27}	—	March 28, 2015	Haleakala	Pan-STARRS 1	·	1.5 km	MPC · JPL
883180	2016 NW_{37}	—	August 13, 2012	Haleakala	Pan-STARRS 1	(5)	890 m	MPC · JPL
883181	2016 NO_{38}	—	July 11, 2016	Haleakala	Pan-STARRS 1	·	1.0 km	MPC · JPL
883182	2016 NU_{41}	—	July 12, 2016	Mount Lemmon	Mount Lemmon Survey	·	1.2 km	MPC · JPL
883183	2016 NJ_{48}	—	June 8, 2016	Haleakala	Pan-STARRS 1	·	1.3 km	MPC · JPL
883184	2016 NA_{49}	—	July 13, 2016	Mount Lemmon	Mount Lemmon Survey	·	800 m	MPC · JPL
883185	2016 NP_{49}	—	October 20, 2012	Mount Lemmon	Mount Lemmon Survey	·	1.1 km	MPC · JPL
883186	2016 NY_{49}	—	July 13, 2016	Mount Lemmon	Mount Lemmon Survey	·	2.2 km	MPC · JPL
883187	2016 NZ_{51}	—	August 10, 2012	Mayhill-ISON	L. Elenin	·	930 m	MPC · JPL
883188	2016 NA_{55}	—	July 14, 2016	Mount Lemmon	Mount Lemmon Survey	·	1.3 km	MPC · JPL
883189	2016 NB_{55}	—	July 7, 2016	Haleakala	Pan-STARRS 1	·	1.6 km	MPC · JPL
883190	2016 NW_{59}	—	July 5, 2016	Haleakala	Pan-STARRS 1	·	1.1 km	MPC · JPL
883191	2016 NX_{59}	—	July 5, 2016	Haleakala	Pan-STARRS 1	·	1.1 km	MPC · JPL
883192	2016 ND_{60}	—	July 6, 2016	Haleakala	Pan-STARRS 1	·	1.1 km	MPC · JPL
883193	2016 NH_{60}	—	July 7, 2016	Mount Lemmon	Mount Lemmon Survey	·	1.4 km	MPC · JPL
883194	2016 NL_{60}	—	July 7, 2016	Mount Lemmon	Mount Lemmon Survey	·	1.3 km	MPC · JPL
883195	2016 NQ_{60}	—	July 7, 2016	Haleakala	Pan-STARRS 1	·	1.2 km	MPC · JPL
883196	2016 NB_{61}	—	July 7, 2016	Haleakala	Pan-STARRS 1	EUN	780 m	MPC · JPL
883197	2016 NJ_{61}	—	July 7, 2016	Haleakala	Pan-STARRS 1	·	1.2 km	MPC · JPL
883198	2016 NN_{61}	—	July 7, 2016	Haleakala	Pan-STARRS 1	·	860 m	MPC · JPL
883199	2016 NJ_{63}	—	July 11, 2016	Haleakala	Pan-STARRS 1	KON	1.7 km	MPC · JPL
883200	2016 NK_{63}	—	July 10, 2016	Mount Lemmon	Mount Lemmon Survey	·	1.3 km	MPC · JPL

== 883201–883300 ==
back to top

Designation			Discovery			Properties		Ref
Permanent	Provisional	Named after	Date	Site	Discoverer(s)	Category	Diam.	Ref
883201	2016 NT_{64}	—	July 14, 2016	Haleakala	Pan-STARRS 1	MAR	680 m	MPC · JPL
883202	2016 NA_{69}	—	March 25, 2007	Mount Lemmon	Mount Lemmon Survey	·	690 m	MPC · JPL
883203	2016 NJ_{71}	—	July 7, 2016	Mount Lemmon	Mount Lemmon Survey	EUN	830 m	MPC · JPL
883204	2016 ND_{80}	—	March 11, 2015	Mount Lemmon	Mount Lemmon Survey	EUN	710 m	MPC · JPL
883205	2016 NN_{80}	—	June 23, 2012	Mount Lemmon	Mount Lemmon Survey	ADE	1.5 km	MPC · JPL
883206	2016 NO_{82}	—	September 16, 2012	Kitt Peak	Spacewatch	·	1.1 km	MPC · JPL
883207	2016 NS_{83}	—	July 11, 2016	Haleakala	Pan-STARRS 1	·	850 m	MPC · JPL
883208	2016 NA_{86}	—	March 21, 2015	Haleakala	Pan-STARRS 1	·	1.3 km	MPC · JPL
883209	2016 NO_{89}	—	October 17, 2012	Haleakala	Pan-STARRS 1	·	1.1 km	MPC · JPL
883210	2016 NQ_{91}	—	July 14, 2016	Haleakala	Pan-STARRS 1	·	560 m	MPC · JPL
883211	2016 NY_{91}	—	July 12, 2016	Haleakala	Pan-STARRS 1	T_{j} (2.98) · 3:2	3.9 km	MPC · JPL
883212	2016 NM_{92}	—	July 9, 2016	Haleakala	Pan-STARRS 1	·	860 m	MPC · JPL
883213	2016 NS_{93}	—	July 4, 2016	Haleakala	Pan-STARRS 1	·	1.1 km	MPC · JPL
883214	2016 NV_{93}	—	July 11, 2016	Haleakala	Pan-STARRS 1	·	760 m	MPC · JPL
883215	2016 NZ_{93}	—	July 5, 2016	Haleakala	Pan-STARRS 1	·	800 m	MPC · JPL
883216	2016 NB_{94}	—	July 7, 2016	Mount Lemmon	Mount Lemmon Survey	·	1.4 km	MPC · JPL
883217	2016 NC_{94}	—	July 11, 2016	Haleakala	Pan-STARRS 1	·	520 m	MPC · JPL
883218	2016 NV_{94}	—	July 4, 2016	Haleakala	Pan-STARRS 1	·	1.4 km	MPC · JPL
883219	2016 NA_{95}	—	July 9, 2016	Mount Lemmon	Mount Lemmon Survey	·	1.4 km	MPC · JPL
883220	2016 NC_{97}	—	July 9, 2016	Mount Lemmon	Mount Lemmon Survey	H	470 m	MPC · JPL
883221	2016 NZ_{97}	—	July 9, 2016	Haleakala	Pan-STARRS 1	·	1.1 km	MPC · JPL
883222	2016 NN_{98}	—	July 7, 2016	Haleakala	Pan-STARRS 1	(1547)	920 m	MPC · JPL
883223	2016 NM_{101}	—	July 9, 2016	Mount Lemmon	Mount Lemmon Survey	critical	720 m	MPC · JPL
883224	2016 NX_{103}	—	July 15, 2016	Mount Lemmon	Mount Lemmon Survey	·	1.3 km	MPC · JPL
883225	2016 NV_{107}	—	July 4, 2016	Haleakala	Pan-STARRS 1	·	800 m	MPC · JPL
883226	2016 NR_{110}	—	July 5, 2016	Haleakala	Pan-STARRS 1	·	1.8 km	MPC · JPL
883227	2016 NF_{112}	—	July 5, 2016	Mount Lemmon	Mount Lemmon Survey	·	1.6 km	MPC · JPL
883228	2016 NA_{114}	—	July 9, 2016	Haleakala	Pan-STARRS 1	·	1.2 km	MPC · JPL
883229	2016 NH_{115}	—	July 10, 2016	Mount Lemmon	Mount Lemmon Survey	·	1.4 km	MPC · JPL
883230	2016 NV_{118}	—	July 14, 2016	Mount Lemmon	Mount Lemmon Survey	·	890 m	MPC · JPL
883231	2016 NU_{119}	—	July 15, 2016	Mount Lemmon	Mount Lemmon Survey	EUN	830 m	MPC · JPL
883232	2016 NK_{120}	—	July 5, 2016	Haleakala	Pan-STARRS 1	·	860 m	MPC · JPL
883233	2016 NV_{127}	—	July 11, 2016	Mount Lemmon	Mount Lemmon Survey	HNS	940 m	MPC · JPL
883234	2016 NJ_{130}	—	July 13, 2016	Mount Lemmon	Mount Lemmon Survey	·	1.1 km	MPC · JPL
883235	2016 NY_{139}	—	July 8, 2016	Haleakala	Pan-STARRS 1	·	1.7 km	MPC · JPL
883236	2016 NZ_{140}	—	July 7, 2016	Haleakala	Pan-STARRS 1	·	940 m	MPC · JPL
883237	2016 NY_{145}	—	July 11, 2016	Haleakala	Pan-STARRS 1	·	1.1 km	MPC · JPL
883238	2016 NX_{146}	—	July 4, 2016	Haleakala	Pan-STARRS 1	·	990 m	MPC · JPL
883239	2016 NC_{148}	—	July 12, 2016	Haleakala	Pan-STARRS 1	ADE	1.2 km	MPC · JPL
883240	2016 NE_{158}	—	July 4, 2016	Haleakala	Pan-STARRS 1	·	1.3 km	MPC · JPL
883241	2016 NG_{158}	—	July 4, 2016	Haleakala	Pan-STARRS 1	ADE	1.2 km	MPC · JPL
883242	2016 NL_{158}	—	July 11, 2016	Haleakala	Pan-STARRS 1	EUN · critical	810 m	MPC · JPL
883243	2016 NR_{164}	—	July 1, 2016	Haleakala	Pan-STARRS 1	·	1.5 km	MPC · JPL
883244	2016 NP_{169}	—	July 7, 2016	Haleakala	Pan-STARRS 1	·	1.2 km	MPC · JPL
883245	2016 NR_{174}	—	July 14, 2016	Haleakala	Pan-STARRS 1	·	1.8 km	MPC · JPL
883246	2016 NN_{195}	—	July 5, 2016	Subaru Telescope,	Subaru Telescope	·	870 m	MPC · JPL
883247	2016 NC_{209}	—	July 6, 2016	Haleakala	Pan-STARRS 1	·	1.0 km	MPC · JPL
883248	2016 NF_{209}	—	July 3, 2016	Mount Lemmon	Mount Lemmon Survey	·	1 km	MPC · JPL
883249	2016 OD_{2}	—	September 24, 2012	Nogales	M. Schwartz, P. R. Holvorcem	·	1.1 km	MPC · JPL
883250	2016 OV_{8}	—	May 22, 2015	Haleakala	Pan-STARRS 1	·	1.6 km	MPC · JPL
883251	2016 ON_{9}	—	July 31, 2016	Haleakala	Pan-STARRS 1	·	1.4 km	MPC · JPL
883252	2016 OU_{9}	—	July 30, 2016	Haleakala	Pan-STARRS 1	·	620 m	MPC · JPL
883253	2016 OY_{9}	—	July 30, 2016	Haleakala	Pan-STARRS 1	·	1.2 km	MPC · JPL
883254	2016 OH_{10}	—	July 30, 2016	Haleakala	Pan-STARRS 1	·	1.0 km	MPC · JPL
883255	2016 OQ_{11}	—	July 30, 2016	Haleakala	Pan-STARRS 1	EUN	880 m	MPC · JPL
883256	2016 OZ_{11}	—	July 17, 2016	Haleakala	Pan-STARRS 1	EUN	800 m	MPC · JPL
883257	2016 OG_{13}	—	July 28, 2016	Haleakala	Pan-STARRS 1	·	1.1 km	MPC · JPL
883258	2016 PS_{1}	—	August 1, 2016	Haleakala	Pan-STARRS 1	·	1.2 km	MPC · JPL
883259	2016 PP_{8}	—	July 4, 2016	Mount Lemmon	Mount Lemmon Survey	·	1.1 km	MPC · JPL
883260	2016 PK_{9}	—	August 2, 2016	Haleakala	Pan-STARRS 1	·	980 m	MPC · JPL
883261	2016 PQ_{17}	—	July 4, 2016	Haleakala	Pan-STARRS 1	·	2.2 km	MPC · JPL
883262	2016 PY_{30}	—	September 20, 2008	Mount Lemmon	Mount Lemmon Survey	EUN	790 m	MPC · JPL
883263	2016 PJ_{36}	—	January 23, 2015	Haleakala	Pan-STARRS 1	·	1.3 km	MPC · JPL
883264	2016 PE_{54}	—	March 16, 2015	Haleakala	Pan-STARRS 1	MAR	720 m	MPC · JPL
883265	2016 PL_{56}	—	January 28, 2015	Haleakala	Pan-STARRS 1	·	1.0 km	MPC · JPL
883266	2016 PF_{57}	—	August 7, 2016	Haleakala	Pan-STARRS 1	·	780 m	MPC · JPL
883267	2016 PP_{59}	—	August 1, 2016	Haleakala	Pan-STARRS 1	ADE	1.2 km	MPC · JPL
883268	2016 PP_{73}	—	August 10, 2016	Haleakala	Pan-STARRS 1	·	1.3 km	MPC · JPL
883269	2016 PZ_{76}	—	June 22, 2010	WISE	WISE	·	3.6 km	MPC · JPL
883270	2016 PK_{77}	—	August 11, 2016	XuYi	PMO NEO Survey Program	·	1.9 km	MPC · JPL
883271	2016 PA_{78}	—	April 14, 2010	WISE	WISE	·	2.1 km	MPC · JPL
883272	2016 PS_{81}	—	August 1, 2016	Haleakala	Pan-STARRS 1	·	1.4 km	MPC · JPL
883273	2016 PT_{81}	—	August 1, 2016	Haleakala	Pan-STARRS 1	MAR	710 m	MPC · JPL
883274	2016 PV_{82}	—	July 11, 2016	Haleakala	Pan-STARRS 1	·	2.0 km	MPC · JPL
883275	2016 PA_{83}	—	August 2, 2016	Haleakala	Pan-STARRS 1	·	1.1 km	MPC · JPL
883276	2016 PU_{83}	—	August 2, 2016	Haleakala	Pan-STARRS 1	NEM	1.5 km	MPC · JPL
883277	2016 PL_{84}	—	August 2, 2016	Haleakala	Pan-STARRS 1	·	920 m	MPC · JPL
883278	2016 PM_{84}	—	August 2, 2016	Haleakala	Pan-STARRS 1	·	940 m	MPC · JPL
883279	2016 PN_{84}	—	August 2, 2016	Haleakala	Pan-STARRS 1	·	1.3 km	MPC · JPL
883280	2016 PO_{84}	—	August 2, 2016	Haleakala	Pan-STARRS 1	·	1.4 km	MPC · JPL
883281	2016 PN_{85}	—	August 3, 2016	Haleakala	Pan-STARRS 1	EUN	1.3 km	MPC · JPL
883282	2016 PT_{85}	—	August 3, 2016	Haleakala	Pan-STARRS 1	·	1.3 km	MPC · JPL
883283	2016 PU_{85}	—	August 3, 2016	Haleakala	Pan-STARRS 1	MAR	720 m	MPC · JPL
883284	2016 PJ_{87}	—	August 10, 2016	Haleakala	Pan-STARRS 1	·	1.1 km	MPC · JPL
883285	2016 PV_{87}	—	August 10, 2016	Haleakala	Pan-STARRS 1	EUN	760 m	MPC · JPL
883286	2016 PD_{88}	—	August 10, 2016	Haleakala	Pan-STARRS 1	·	1.4 km	MPC · JPL
883287	2016 PK_{88}	—	August 14, 2016	Haleakala	Pan-STARRS 1	EUN	880 m	MPC · JPL
883288	2016 PL_{88}	—	August 14, 2016	Haleakala	Pan-STARRS 1	·	1.0 km	MPC · JPL
883289	2016 PN_{88}	—	August 29, 2016	Mount Lemmon	Mount Lemmon Survey	·	1.1 km	MPC · JPL
883290	2016 PX_{88}	—	August 15, 2016	Haleakala	Pan-STARRS 1	·	1.1 km	MPC · JPL
883291	2016 PM_{93}	—	April 24, 2015	Haleakala	Pan-STARRS 1	·	1.4 km	MPC · JPL
883292	2016 PS_{97}	—	August 6, 2016	Haleakala	Pan-STARRS 1	·	1.0 km	MPC · JPL
883293	2016 PT_{98}	—	October 10, 2012	Mount Lemmon	Mount Lemmon Survey	EUN	810 m	MPC · JPL
883294	2016 PQ_{101}	—	October 22, 2012	Haleakala	Pan-STARRS 1	·	1.1 km	MPC · JPL
883295	2016 PF_{104}	—	September 3, 2008	Kitt Peak	Spacewatch	·	900 m	MPC · JPL
883296	2016 PH_{104}	—	August 1, 2016	Haleakala	Pan-STARRS 1	·	1.0 km	MPC · JPL
883297	2016 PO_{111}	—	March 16, 2015	Haleakala	Pan-STARRS 1	·	810 m	MPC · JPL
883298	2016 PR_{113}	—	December 8, 2012	Mount Lemmon	Mount Lemmon Survey	·	990 m	MPC · JPL
883299	2016 PW_{113}	—	August 2, 2016	Haleakala	Pan-STARRS 1	·	1.1 km	MPC · JPL
883300	2016 PG_{114}	—	November 6, 2012	Mount Lemmon	Mount Lemmon Survey	·	910 m	MPC · JPL

== 883301–883400 ==
back to top

Designation			Discovery			Properties		Ref
Permanent	Provisional	Named after	Date	Site	Discoverer(s)	Category	Diam.	Ref
883301	2016 PE_{116}	—	May 21, 2015	Haleakala	Pan-STARRS 1	·	1.3 km	MPC · JPL
883302	2016 PJ_{117}	—	September 24, 2008	Kitt Peak	Spacewatch	(5)	870 m	MPC · JPL
883303	2016 PJ_{120}	—	October 6, 2012	Haleakala	Pan-STARRS 1	EUN	920 m	MPC · JPL
883304	2016 PT_{126}	—	November 2, 2012	Mount Lemmon	Mount Lemmon Survey	·	1.0 km	MPC · JPL
883305	2016 PJ_{127}	—	September 18, 2007	Kitt Peak	Spacewatch	·	1.2 km	MPC · JPL
883306	2016 PM_{128}	—	August 2, 2016	Haleakala	Pan-STARRS 1	·	1.1 km	MPC · JPL
883307	2016 PU_{128}	—	August 4, 2016	Cerro Paranal	Gaia Ground Based Optical Tracking	·	920 m	MPC · JPL
883308	2016 PX_{129}	—	August 2, 2016	Haleakala	Pan-STARRS 1	·	1.1 km	MPC · JPL
883309	2016 PN_{130}	—	August 10, 2016	Haleakala	Pan-STARRS 1	·	1.3 km	MPC · JPL
883310	2016 PU_{130}	—	August 3, 2016	Haleakala	Pan-STARRS 1	EUN	840 m	MPC · JPL
883311	2016 PQ_{132}	—	August 2, 2016	Haleakala	Pan-STARRS 1	·	910 m	MPC · JPL
883312	2016 PY_{132}	—	August 1, 2016	Haleakala	Pan-STARRS 1	·	790 m	MPC · JPL
883313	2016 PV_{134}	—	September 28, 2003	Kitt Peak	Spacewatch	·	840 m	MPC · JPL
883314	2016 PB_{136}	—	August 2, 2016	Haleakala	Pan-STARRS 1	·	1.2 km	MPC · JPL
883315	2016 PE_{136}	—	August 2, 2016	Haleakala	Pan-STARRS 1	·	1.0 km	MPC · JPL
883316	2016 PL_{136}	—	August 2, 2016	Haleakala	Pan-STARRS 1	·	1.1 km	MPC · JPL
883317	2016 PN_{136}	—	August 2, 2016	Haleakala	Pan-STARRS 1	(5)	740 m	MPC · JPL
883318	2016 PR_{136}	—	August 3, 2016	Haleakala	Pan-STARRS 1	·	1.3 km	MPC · JPL
883319	2016 PA_{138}	—	June 8, 2015	Haleakala	Pan-STARRS 1	·	1.7 km	MPC · JPL
883320	2016 PD_{138}	—	August 4, 2016	Haleakala	Pan-STARRS 1	·	1.3 km	MPC · JPL
883321	2016 PZ_{138}	—	August 10, 2016	Haleakala	Pan-STARRS 1	·	1.3 km	MPC · JPL
883322	2016 PE_{139}	—	August 3, 2016	Haleakala	Pan-STARRS 1	·	1.2 km	MPC · JPL
883323	2016 PF_{139}	—	August 2, 2016	Haleakala	Pan-STARRS 1	JUN	720 m	MPC · JPL
883324	2016 PZ_{139}	—	August 10, 2016	Haleakala	Pan-STARRS 1	·	1.6 km	MPC · JPL
883325	2016 PK_{142}	—	August 10, 2012	Kitt Peak	Spacewatch	·	1.1 km	MPC · JPL
883326	2016 PO_{142}	—	August 3, 2016	Haleakala	Pan-STARRS 1	·	840 m	MPC · JPL
883327	2016 PS_{142}	—	August 8, 2016	Haleakala	Pan-STARRS 1	T_{j} (2.95)	2.4 km	MPC · JPL
883328	2016 PZ_{145}	—	August 2, 2016	Haleakala	Pan-STARRS 1	EUN	820 m	MPC · JPL
883329	2016 PX_{149}	—	August 14, 2016	Haleakala	Pan-STARRS 1	·	1.4 km	MPC · JPL
883330	2016 PT_{153}	—	August 10, 2016	Haleakala	Pan-STARRS 1	·	1.2 km	MPC · JPL
883331	2016 PS_{156}	—	August 2, 2016	Haleakala	Pan-STARRS 1	·	1.1 km	MPC · JPL
883332	2016 PF_{159}	—	August 10, 2016	Haleakala	Pan-STARRS 1	·	1.1 km	MPC · JPL
883333	2016 PJ_{159}	—	September 6, 2008	Kitt Peak	Spacewatch	·	740 m	MPC · JPL
883334	2016 PN_{159}	—	August 1, 2016	Haleakala	Pan-STARRS 1	·	960 m	MPC · JPL
883335	2016 PM_{160}	—	August 14, 2016	Haleakala	Pan-STARRS 1	·	1.4 km	MPC · JPL
883336	2016 PD_{162}	—	August 12, 2016	Haleakala	Pan-STARRS 1	·	980 m	MPC · JPL
883337	2016 PB_{163}	—	August 7, 2016	Haleakala	Pan-STARRS 1	·	890 m	MPC · JPL
883338	2016 PD_{163}	—	August 13, 2016	Haleakala	Pan-STARRS 1	·	800 m	MPC · JPL
883339	2016 PE_{163}	—	August 13, 2016	Haleakala	Pan-STARRS 1	MAR	630 m	MPC · JPL
883340	2016 PG_{163}	—	August 13, 2016	Haleakala	Pan-STARRS 1	·	920 m	MPC · JPL
883341	2016 PL_{163}	—	August 2, 2016	Haleakala	Pan-STARRS 1	·	950 m	MPC · JPL
883342	2016 PR_{163}	—	August 3, 2016	Haleakala	Pan-STARRS 1	·	890 m	MPC · JPL
883343	2016 PC_{164}	—	August 6, 2016	Haleakala	Pan-STARRS 1	·	750 m	MPC · JPL
883344	2016 PF_{164}	—	August 8, 2016	Haleakala	Pan-STARRS 1	·	1.2 km	MPC · JPL
883345	2016 PR_{164}	—	August 10, 2016	Haleakala	Pan-STARRS 1	·	1.1 km	MPC · JPL
883346	2016 PQ_{165}	—	August 8, 2016	Haleakala	Pan-STARRS 1	MAR	610 m	MPC · JPL
883347	2016 PN_{166}	—	August 2, 2016	Haleakala	Pan-STARRS 1	MAR	760 m	MPC · JPL
883348	2016 PX_{167}	—	August 9, 2016	Haleakala	Pan-STARRS 1	·	950 m	MPC · JPL
883349	2016 PH_{169}	—	August 7, 2016	Haleakala	Pan-STARRS 1	EUN	860 m	MPC · JPL
883350	2016 PJ_{169}	—	August 3, 2016	Haleakala	Pan-STARRS 1	EOS	1.3 km	MPC · JPL
883351	2016 PB_{171}	—	August 2, 2016	Haleakala	Pan-STARRS 1	·	650 m	MPC · JPL
883352	2016 PR_{173}	—	August 14, 2016	Haleakala	Pan-STARRS 1	HNS	800 m	MPC · JPL
883353	2016 PK_{174}	—	August 3, 2016	Haleakala	Pan-STARRS 1	·	1.1 km	MPC · JPL
883354	2016 PD_{175}	—	August 10, 2016	Haleakala	Pan-STARRS 1	(5)	700 m	MPC · JPL
883355	2016 PJ_{177}	—	August 14, 2016	Haleakala	Pan-STARRS 1	·	930 m	MPC · JPL
883356	2016 PM_{178}	—	August 6, 2016	Haleakala	Pan-STARRS 1	·	810 m	MPC · JPL
883357	2016 PJ_{179}	—	August 8, 2016	Haleakala	Pan-STARRS 1	·	910 m	MPC · JPL
883358	2016 PC_{196}	—	August 2, 2016	Haleakala	Pan-STARRS 1	·	1.4 km	MPC · JPL
883359	2016 PJ_{200}	—	August 2, 2016	Haleakala	Pan-STARRS 1	EOS	1.3 km	MPC · JPL
883360	2016 PB_{208}	—	August 7, 2016	Haleakala	Pan-STARRS 1	·	1.0 km	MPC · JPL
883361	2016 PR_{208}	—	August 2, 2016	Haleakala	Pan-STARRS 1	·	1.6 km	MPC · JPL
883362	2016 PG_{217}	—	August 3, 2016	Haleakala	Pan-STARRS 1	·	1.6 km	MPC · JPL
883363	2016 PR_{221}	—	August 8, 2016	Haleakala	Pan-STARRS 1	·	1.1 km	MPC · JPL
883364	2016 PQ_{227}	—	August 3, 2016	Haleakala	Pan-STARRS 1	·	1.1 km	MPC · JPL
883365	2016 PM_{246}	—	August 3, 2016	Haleakala	Pan-STARRS 1	·	990 m	MPC · JPL
883366	2016 PX_{258}	—	August 2, 2016	Haleakala	Pan-STARRS 1	URS	2.2 km	MPC · JPL
883367	2016 PO_{292}	—	August 8, 2016	Haleakala	Pan-STARRS 1	EUN	640 m	MPC · JPL
883368	2016 PK_{294}	—	September 6, 2016	Mount Lemmon	Mount Lemmon Survey	EUN	600 m	MPC · JPL
883369	2016 PU_{294}	—	August 7, 2016	Haleakala	Pan-STARRS 1	·	870 m	MPC · JPL
883370	2016 PK_{296}	—	August 9, 2016	Subaru Telescope,	Subaru Telescope	·	1.5 km	MPC · JPL
883371	2016 PG_{320}	—	August 3, 2016	Haleakala	Pan-STARRS 1	·	820 m	MPC · JPL
883372	2016 QP_{1}	—	December 22, 2012	Haleakala	Pan-STARRS 1	·	2.0 km	MPC · JPL
883373	2016 QR_{2}	—	July 7, 2016	Haleakala	Pan-STARRS 1	critical	1.1 km	MPC · JPL
883374	2016 QH_{4}	—	June 7, 2016	Haleakala	Pan-STARRS 1	·	980 m	MPC · JPL
883375	2016 QZ_{4}	—	August 3, 2016	Haleakala	Pan-STARRS 1	EUN	770 m	MPC · JPL
883376	2016 QF_{6}	—	October 9, 2012	Haleakala	Pan-STARRS 1	·	1.3 km	MPC · JPL
883377	2016 QC_{11}	—	September 30, 2005	Catalina	CSS	·	1.1 km	MPC · JPL
883378	2016 QM_{11}	—	August 25, 2016	WISE	WISE	T_{j} (2.83) · APO +1km	1.9 km	MPC · JPL
883379	2016 QG_{12}	—	September 23, 2012	Kitt Peak	Spacewatch	·	790 m	MPC · JPL
883380	2016 QK_{12}	—	July 11, 2016	Haleakala	Pan-STARRS 1	(1547)	1.4 km	MPC · JPL
883381	2016 QL_{12}	—	August 3, 2016	Haleakala	Pan-STARRS 1	·	1.1 km	MPC · JPL
883382	2016 QB_{13}	—	September 17, 2012	Črni Vrh	Mikuž, B.	·	1.3 km	MPC · JPL
883383	2016 QG_{15}	—	October 1, 2008	Mount Lemmon	Mount Lemmon Survey	·	690 m	MPC · JPL
883384	2016 QW_{15}	—	August 26, 2016	Haleakala	Pan-STARRS 1	·	930 m	MPC · JPL
883385	2016 QE_{17}	—	August 26, 2016	Haleakala	Pan-STARRS 1	·	930 m	MPC · JPL
883386	2016 QA_{18}	—	July 9, 2016	Haleakala	Pan-STARRS 1	EUN	790 m	MPC · JPL
883387	2016 QU_{18}	—	July 5, 2003	Kitt Peak	Spacewatch	·	1.2 km	MPC · JPL
883388	2016 QM_{23}	—	March 28, 2014	Mount Lemmon	Mount Lemmon Survey	3:2	3.8 km	MPC · JPL
883389	2016 QX_{23}	—	October 3, 2013	Kitt Peak	Spacewatch	·	590 m	MPC · JPL
883390	2016 QX_{24}	—	August 26, 2016	Haleakala	Pan-STARRS 1	·	2.2 km	MPC · JPL
883391	2016 QZ_{26}	—	August 26, 2016	Haleakala	Pan-STARRS 1	·	1.1 km	MPC · JPL
883392	2016 QA_{27}	—	August 26, 2016	Haleakala	Pan-STARRS 1	·	1.2 km	MPC · JPL
883393	2016 QH_{27}	—	September 29, 2000	Kitt Peak	Spacewatch	·	2.3 km	MPC · JPL
883394	2016 QG_{29}	—	February 16, 2015	Haleakala	Pan-STARRS 1	·	930 m	MPC · JPL
883395	2016 QD_{33}	—	October 9, 2012	Mount Lemmon	Mount Lemmon Survey	·	980 m	MPC · JPL
883396	2016 QN_{33}	—	July 7, 2016	Mount Lemmon	Mount Lemmon Survey	BAR	1.3 km	MPC · JPL
883397	2016 QU_{33}	—	July 13, 2016	Mount Lemmon	Mount Lemmon Survey	JUN	760 m	MPC · JPL
883398	2016 QK_{34}	—	July 7, 2016	Haleakala	Pan-STARRS 1	·	1.1 km	MPC · JPL
883399	2016 QV_{35}	—	July 5, 2016	Haleakala	Pan-STARRS 1	·	960 m	MPC · JPL
883400	2016 QP_{48}	—	October 8, 2007	Catalina	CSS	·	1.2 km	MPC · JPL

== 883401–883500 ==
back to top

Designation			Discovery			Properties		Ref
Permanent	Provisional	Named after	Date	Site	Discoverer(s)	Category	Diam.	Ref
883401	2016 QN_{50}	—	July 11, 2016	Haleakala	Pan-STARRS 1	·	1.2 km	MPC · JPL
883402	2016 QL_{51}	—	September 16, 2012	Mount Lemmon	Mount Lemmon Survey	·	900 m	MPC · JPL
883403	2016 QS_{51}	—	August 3, 2016	Haleakala	Pan-STARRS 1	·	930 m	MPC · JPL
883404	2016 QA_{60}	—	July 11, 2016	Haleakala	Pan-STARRS 1	·	810 m	MPC · JPL
883405	2016 QL_{69}	—	September 24, 2008	Kitt Peak	Spacewatch	·	860 m	MPC · JPL
883406	2016 QA_{71}	—	September 18, 2012	Kitt Peak	Spacewatch	·	900 m	MPC · JPL
883407	2016 QG_{71}	—	August 29, 2016	Mount Lemmon	Mount Lemmon Survey	·	900 m	MPC · JPL
883408	2016 QJ_{76}	—	October 21, 2012	Mount Lemmon	Mount Lemmon Survey	·	1.1 km	MPC · JPL
883409	2016 QO_{76}	—	July 17, 2016	Haleakala	Pan-STARRS 1	·	1.2 km	MPC · JPL
883410	2016 QJ_{84}	—	October 24, 2011	Haleakala	Pan-STARRS 1	(1298)	1.7 km	MPC · JPL
883411	2016 QN_{86}	—	August 26, 2016	Haleakala	Pan-STARRS 1	·	1.7 km	MPC · JPL
883412	2016 QK_{87}	—	October 15, 2012	Kitt Peak	Spacewatch	·	1.0 km	MPC · JPL
883413	2016 QO_{89}	—	November 7, 2008	Mount Lemmon	Mount Lemmon Survey	(5)	830 m	MPC · JPL
883414	2016 QM_{95}	—	August 26, 2016	Haleakala	Pan-STARRS 1	·	1.2 km	MPC · JPL
883415	2016 QR_{95}	—	August 30, 2016	Haleakala	Pan-STARRS 1	·	1.1 km	MPC · JPL
883416	2016 QJ_{96}	—	August 30, 2016	Mount Lemmon	Mount Lemmon Survey	·	1.1 km	MPC · JPL
883417	2016 QN_{96}	—	August 30, 2016	Mount Lemmon	Mount Lemmon Survey	·	960 m	MPC · JPL
883418	2016 QA_{97}	—	August 16, 2016	Haleakala	Pan-STARRS 1	·	1.3 km	MPC · JPL
883419	2016 QE_{97}	—	August 1, 2016	Haleakala	Pan-STARRS 1	·	1.4 km	MPC · JPL
883420	2016 QL_{97}	—	August 16, 2016	Haleakala	Pan-STARRS 1	·	1.1 km	MPC · JPL
883421	2016 QS_{97}	—	August 27, 2016	Haleakala	Pan-STARRS 1	·	1.2 km	MPC · JPL
883422	2016 QT_{98}	—	August 17, 2016	Haleakala	Pan-STARRS 1	·	540 m	MPC · JPL
883423	2016 QY_{99}	—	August 28, 2016	Mount Lemmon	Mount Lemmon Survey	·	1.1 km	MPC · JPL
883424	2016 QP_{101}	—	August 30, 2016	Mount Lemmon	Mount Lemmon Survey	·	1.4 km	MPC · JPL
883425	2016 QH_{102}	—	August 29, 2016	Mount Lemmon	Mount Lemmon Survey	·	1.3 km	MPC · JPL
883426	2016 QE_{103}	—	August 17, 2016	Haleakala	Pan-STARRS 1	·	1.8 km	MPC · JPL
883427	2016 QL_{104}	—	August 29, 2016	Mount Lemmon	Mount Lemmon Survey	KON	1.6 km	MPC · JPL
883428	2016 QR_{104}	—	August 30, 2016	Mount Lemmon	Mount Lemmon Survey	MIS	1.8 km	MPC · JPL
883429	2016 QU_{104}	—	August 30, 2016	Haleakala	Pan-STARRS 1	·	500 m	MPC · JPL
883430	2016 QS_{105}	—	August 27, 2016	Haleakala	Pan-STARRS 1	·	1.1 km	MPC · JPL
883431	2016 QU_{108}	—	August 29, 2016	XuYi	PMO NEO Survey Program	MAR	780 m	MPC · JPL
883432	2016 QY_{108}	—	August 26, 2016	Haleakala	Pan-STARRS 1	HNS	850 m	MPC · JPL
883433	2016 QX_{112}	—	August 30, 2016	Haleakala	Pan-STARRS 1	·	2.2 km	MPC · JPL
883434	2016 QR_{113}	—	August 30, 2016	Mount Lemmon	Mount Lemmon Survey	·	900 m	MPC · JPL
883435	2016 QD_{114}	—	August 26, 2016	Haleakala	Pan-STARRS 1	KON	1.6 km	MPC · JPL
883436	2016 QJ_{114}	—	August 29, 2016	Mount Lemmon	Mount Lemmon Survey	EUN	800 m	MPC · JPL
883437	2016 QT_{114}	—	August 27, 2016	Haleakala	Pan-STARRS 1	EUN	750 m	MPC · JPL
883438	2016 QA_{115}	—	August 30, 2016	Haleakala	Pan-STARRS 1	·	930 m	MPC · JPL
883439	2016 QT_{116}	—	August 16, 2016	Haleakala	Pan-STARRS 1	·	1.1 km	MPC · JPL
883440	2016 QK_{120}	—	August 27, 2016	Haleakala	Pan-STARRS 1	·	1.2 km	MPC · JPL
883441	2016 QN_{124}	—	August 27, 2016	Haleakala	Pan-STARRS 1	(883)	650 m	MPC · JPL
883442	2016 QQ_{124}	—	August 27, 2016	Haleakala	Pan-STARRS 1	·	1.1 km	MPC · JPL
883443	2016 QU_{124}	—	August 28, 2016	Mount Lemmon	Mount Lemmon Survey	·	1.4 km	MPC · JPL
883444	2016 QF_{132}	—	September 4, 2007	Catalina	CSS	·	1.0 km	MPC · JPL
883445	2016 QX_{138}	—	August 30, 2016	Mount Lemmon	Mount Lemmon Survey	critical	1.3 km	MPC · JPL
883446	2016 QR_{156}	—	August 26, 2016	Mount Lemmon	Mount Lemmon Survey	·	1.0 km	MPC · JPL
883447	2016 RX_{1}	—	August 14, 2016	Haleakala	Pan-STARRS 1	·	1.5 km	MPC · JPL
883448	2016 RY_{2}	—	September 4, 1999	Kitt Peak	Spacewatch	THB	2.4 km	MPC · JPL
883449	2016 RU_{5}	—	August 27, 2016	Haleakala	Pan-STARRS 1	·	1.4 km	MPC · JPL
883450	2016 RG_{7}	—	April 2, 2011	Mount Lemmon	Mount Lemmon Survey	·	960 m	MPC · JPL
883451	2016 RT_{8}	—	October 22, 2011	Mount Lemmon	Mount Lemmon Survey	VER	1.6 km	MPC · JPL
883452	2016 RU_{13}	—	January 23, 2015	Haleakala	Pan-STARRS 1	·	1.4 km	MPC · JPL
883453	2016 RT_{14}	—	July 13, 2016	Mount Lemmon	Mount Lemmon Survey	EUN	930 m	MPC · JPL
883454	2016 RU_{17}	—	September 4, 2016	Mount Lemmon	Mount Lemmon Survey	·	870 m	MPC · JPL
883455	2016 RP_{21}	—	April 20, 2015	Haleakala	Pan-STARRS 1	·	1.4 km	MPC · JPL
883456	2016 RE_{23}	—	July 7, 2016	Haleakala	Pan-STARRS 1	·	1.1 km	MPC · JPL
883457	2016 RA_{26}	—	August 3, 2016	Haleakala	Pan-STARRS 1	·	1.1 km	MPC · JPL
883458	2016 RV_{27}	—	October 10, 2012	Haleakala	Pan-STARRS 1	·	1.4 km	MPC · JPL
883459	2016 RG_{28}	—	January 3, 2009	Mount Lemmon	Mount Lemmon Survey	·	990 m	MPC · JPL
883460	2016 RK_{31}	—	September 21, 2012	Catalina	CSS	·	950 m	MPC · JPL
883461	2016 RL_{33}	—	September 10, 2016	Mount Lemmon	Mount Lemmon Survey	·	1.4 km	MPC · JPL
883462	2016 RN_{34}	—	November 27, 2011	Mount Lemmon	Mount Lemmon Survey	H	430 m	MPC · JPL
883463	2016 RZ_{36}	—	August 28, 2016	Mount Lemmon	Mount Lemmon Survey	3:2	3.5 km	MPC · JPL
883464	2016 RY_{37}	—	October 16, 2012	Mount Lemmon	Mount Lemmon Survey	·	940 m	MPC · JPL
883465	2016 RQ_{41}	—	September 12, 2016	Haleakala	Pan-STARRS 1	APO	340 m	MPC · JPL
883466	2016 RB_{43}	—	September 2, 2016	Mount Lemmon	Mount Lemmon Survey	HNS	830 m	MPC · JPL
883467	2016 RN_{44}	—	September 12, 2016	Haleakala	Pan-STARRS 1	·	1.6 km	MPC · JPL
883468	2016 RQ_{50}	—	September 8, 2016	Haleakala	Pan-STARRS 1	MAR	790 m	MPC · JPL
883469	2016 RS_{50}	—	September 8, 2016	Haleakala	Pan-STARRS 1	·	1.1 km	MPC · JPL
883470	2016 RD_{51}	—	September 10, 2016	Kitt Peak	Spacewatch	·	950 m	MPC · JPL
883471	2016 RK_{51}	—	September 10, 2016	Mount Lemmon	Mount Lemmon Survey	·	1.4 km	MPC · JPL
883472	2016 RQ_{52}	—	September 3, 2016	Mount Lemmon	Mount Lemmon Survey	PHO	810 m	MPC · JPL
883473	2016 RC_{53}	—	September 6, 2016	Mount Lemmon	Mount Lemmon Survey	·	770 m	MPC · JPL
883474	2016 RK_{53}	—	September 11, 2016	Mount Lemmon	Mount Lemmon Survey	·	1.1 km	MPC · JPL
883475	2016 RF_{54}	—	September 6, 2016	Mount Lemmon	Mount Lemmon Survey	·	1.1 km	MPC · JPL
883476	2016 RL_{55}	—	September 4, 2016	Mount Lemmon	Mount Lemmon Survey	·	610 m	MPC · JPL
883477	2016 RO_{55}	—	September 11, 2016	Mount Lemmon	Mount Lemmon Survey	EUN	850 m	MPC · JPL
883478	2016 RP_{55}	—	September 5, 2016	Mount Lemmon	Mount Lemmon Survey	JUN	620 m	MPC · JPL
883479	2016 RQ_{55}	—	September 11, 2016	Mount Lemmon	Mount Lemmon Survey	·	1.2 km	MPC · JPL
883480	2016 RS_{55}	—	September 6, 2016	Mount Lemmon	Mount Lemmon Survey	·	1.0 km	MPC · JPL
883481	2016 RX_{56}	—	September 12, 2016	Mount Lemmon	Mount Lemmon Survey	BAR	750 m	MPC · JPL
883482	2016 RC_{57}	—	September 5, 2016	Mount Lemmon	Mount Lemmon Survey	JUN	660 m	MPC · JPL
883483	2016 RH_{57}	—	September 11, 2016	Mount Lemmon	Mount Lemmon Survey	·	1.1 km	MPC · JPL
883484	2016 RZ_{58}	—	September 8, 2016	Haleakala	Pan-STARRS 1	·	960 m	MPC · JPL
883485	2016 RJ_{59}	—	September 6, 2016	Mount Lemmon	Mount Lemmon Survey	·	860 m	MPC · JPL
883486	2016 RG_{60}	—	September 3, 2016	Mount Lemmon	Mount Lemmon Survey	·	1.1 km	MPC · JPL
883487	2016 RB_{61}	—	September 8, 2016	Haleakala	Pan-STARRS 1	·	840 m	MPC · JPL
883488	2016 RC_{61}	—	September 5, 2016	Mount Lemmon	Mount Lemmon Survey	MAR	960 m	MPC · JPL
883489	2016 RE_{61}	—	September 8, 2016	Haleakala	Pan-STARRS 1	JUN	790 m	MPC · JPL
883490	2016 RM_{61}	—	September 6, 2016	Mount Lemmon	Mount Lemmon Survey	·	1.2 km	MPC · JPL
883491	2016 RY_{61}	—	September 6, 2016	Mount Lemmon	Mount Lemmon Survey	·	820 m	MPC · JPL
883492	2016 RZ_{61}	—	September 8, 2016	Haleakala	Pan-STARRS 1	(1547)	1.0 km	MPC · JPL
883493	2016 RB_{62}	—	September 8, 2016	Haleakala	Pan-STARRS 1	·	1.3 km	MPC · JPL
883494	2016 RS_{62}	—	September 12, 2016	Haleakala	Pan-STARRS 1	RAF	670 m	MPC · JPL
883495	2016 RR_{66}	—	September 2, 2016	Mount Lemmon	Mount Lemmon Survey	·	1.5 km	MPC · JPL
883496	2016 RF_{67}	—	September 12, 2016	Haleakala	Pan-STARRS 1	(5)	900 m	MPC · JPL
883497	2016 RH_{67}	—	September 6, 2016	Mount Lemmon	Mount Lemmon Survey	·	960 m	MPC · JPL
883498	2016 RC_{68}	—	September 3, 2016	Mount Lemmon	Mount Lemmon Survey	MAR	700 m	MPC · JPL
883499	2016 RF_{68}	—	September 10, 2016	Mount Lemmon	Mount Lemmon Survey	·	760 m	MPC · JPL
883500	2016 RT_{68}	—	September 4, 2016	Mount Lemmon	Mount Lemmon Survey	·	990 m	MPC · JPL

== 883501–883600 ==
back to top

Designation			Discovery			Properties		Ref
Permanent	Provisional	Named after	Date	Site	Discoverer(s)	Category	Diam.	Ref
883501	2016 RT_{70}	—	September 4, 2016	Mount Lemmon	Mount Lemmon Survey	MAR	860 m	MPC · JPL
883502	2016 RX_{70}	—	September 6, 2016	Mount Lemmon	Mount Lemmon Survey	·	1.2 km	MPC · JPL
883503	2016 RC_{71}	—	September 12, 2016	Haleakala	Pan-STARRS 1	·	1.5 km	MPC · JPL
883504	2016 RM_{74}	—	September 3, 2016	Mount Lemmon	Mount Lemmon Survey	HNS	800 m	MPC · JPL
883505	2016 RB_{76}	—	September 10, 2016	Mount Lemmon	Mount Lemmon Survey	EUN	750 m	MPC · JPL
883506	2016 RQ_{77}	—	September 12, 2016	Haleakala	Pan-STARRS 1	·	780 m	MPC · JPL
883507	2016 SS_{1}	—	December 30, 2008	Mount Lemmon	Mount Lemmon Survey	BAR	850 m	MPC · JPL
883508	2016 SH_{4}	—	September 3, 2007	Mount Lemmon	Mount Lemmon Survey	·	1.1 km	MPC · JPL
883509	2016 SH_{5}	—	August 1, 2016	Haleakala	Pan-STARRS 1	·	680 m	MPC · JPL
883510	2016 SW_{5}	—	February 20, 2015	Haleakala	Pan-STARRS 1	·	1.3 km	MPC · JPL
883511	2016 SL_{12}	—	September 15, 2007	Kitt Peak	Spacewatch	critical	740 m	MPC · JPL
883512	2016 SC_{14}	—	October 17, 2012	Kitt Peak	Spacewatch	(5)	790 m	MPC · JPL
883513	2016 SQ_{16}	—	October 22, 2012	Mount Lemmon	Mount Lemmon Survey	·	610 m	MPC · JPL
883514	2016 SH_{17}	—	October 22, 2012	Haleakala	Pan-STARRS 1	·	920 m	MPC · JPL
883515	2016 SE_{19}	—	October 9, 2012	Mount Lemmon	Mount Lemmon Survey	·	1.0 km	MPC · JPL
883516	2016 SE_{21}	—	August 12, 2016	Haleakala	Pan-STARRS 1	(194)	1.3 km	MPC · JPL
883517	2016 SM_{21}	—	September 27, 2016	Haleakala	Pan-STARRS 1	·	1.2 km	MPC · JPL
883518	2016 SY_{21}	—	July 9, 2016	Mount Lemmon	Mount Lemmon Survey	(194)	1.4 km	MPC · JPL
883519	2016 SQ_{23}	—	October 14, 2012	Kitt Peak	Spacewatch	·	880 m	MPC · JPL
883520	2016 SM_{26}	—	August 3, 2016	Haleakala	Pan-STARRS 1	EUN	950 m	MPC · JPL
883521	2016 SW_{28}	—	October 26, 2012	Haleakala	Pan-STARRS 1	EUN	980 m	MPC · JPL
883522	2016 ST_{30}	—	September 25, 2016	Haleakala	Pan-STARRS 1	·	1.7 km	MPC · JPL
883523	2016 SY_{32}	—	August 2, 2016	Haleakala	Pan-STARRS 1	·	1.1 km	MPC · JPL
883524	2016 SS_{34}	—	September 16, 2012	Mount Lemmon	Mount Lemmon Survey	·	960 m	MPC · JPL
883525	2016 SQ_{36}	—	October 12, 2007	Kitt Peak	Spacewatch	·	1.5 km	MPC · JPL
883526	2016 SZ_{36}	—	September 25, 2016	Mount Lemmon	Mount Lemmon Survey	KON	1.4 km	MPC · JPL
883527	2016 ST_{39}	—	August 30, 2016	Mount Lemmon	Mount Lemmon Survey	·	1.1 km	MPC · JPL
883528	2016 SQ_{40}	—	August 28, 2012	Mount Lemmon	Mount Lemmon Survey	·	940 m	MPC · JPL
883529	2016 ST_{41}	—	August 30, 2016	Mount Lemmon	Mount Lemmon Survey	·	1.3 km	MPC · JPL
883530	2016 SR_{44}	—	August 10, 2016	Haleakala	Pan-STARRS 1	·	1.1 km	MPC · JPL
883531	2016 SS_{44}	—	August 17, 2016	Haleakala	Pan-STARRS 1	·	1.3 km	MPC · JPL
883532	2016 SZ_{47}	—	October 20, 2003	Kitt Peak	Spacewatch	·	1.2 km	MPC · JPL
883533	2016 SF_{48}	—	September 26, 2016	Haleakala	Pan-STARRS 1	·	860 m	MPC · JPL
883534	2016 SL_{48}	—	September 13, 2002	Palomar	NEAT	·	1.3 km	MPC · JPL
883535	2016 SW_{49}	—	November 5, 2007	Mount Lemmon	Mount Lemmon Survey	·	1.3 km	MPC · JPL
883536	2016 SO_{51}	—	November 18, 2003	Kitt Peak	Spacewatch	·	1.1 km	MPC · JPL
883537	2016 SJ_{53}	—	September 23, 2012	Mount Lemmon	Mount Lemmon Survey	·	800 m	MPC · JPL
883538	2016 SE_{56}	—	August 12, 2016	Haleakala	Pan-STARRS 1	·	163 km	MPC · JPL
883539	2016 SC_{64}	—	September 25, 2016	Mount Lemmon	Mount Lemmon Survey	HNS	960 m	MPC · JPL
883540	2016 ST_{64}	—	September 25, 2016	Haleakala	Pan-STARRS 1	EUN	900 m	MPC · JPL
883541	2016 SH_{65}	—	September 25, 2016	Haleakala	Pan-STARRS 1	PHO	770 m	MPC · JPL
883542	2016 SV_{65}	—	December 1, 2008	Mount Lemmon	Mount Lemmon Survey	·	890 m	MPC · JPL
883543	2016 SE_{66}	—	September 27, 2016	Mount Lemmon	Mount Lemmon Survey	·	940 m	MPC · JPL
883544	2016 SM_{66}	—	September 25, 2016	Haleakala	Pan-STARRS 1	BAR	800 m	MPC · JPL
883545	2016 SV_{66}	—	September 25, 2016	Mount Lemmon	Mount Lemmon Survey	·	1.5 km	MPC · JPL
883546	2016 SW_{66}	—	September 27, 2016	Haleakala	Pan-STARRS 1	·	920 m	MPC · JPL
883547	2016 SU_{68}	—	September 21, 2016	Haleakala	Pan-STARRS 1	·	1.1 km	MPC · JPL
883548	2016 SV_{70}	—	September 25, 2016	Mount Lemmon	Mount Lemmon Survey	·	1.2 km	MPC · JPL
883549	2016 SC_{71}	—	September 25, 2016	Mount Lemmon	Mount Lemmon Survey	·	1.3 km	MPC · JPL
883550	2016 SH_{73}	—	September 26, 2016	Haleakala	Pan-STARRS 1	(1547)	1.1 km	MPC · JPL
883551	2016 SA_{76}	—	September 27, 2016	Mount Lemmon	Mount Lemmon Survey	·	1.5 km	MPC · JPL
883552	2016 SZ_{76}	—	September 6, 2016	Mount Lemmon	Mount Lemmon Survey	JUN	700 m	MPC · JPL
883553	2016 SF_{77}	—	September 27, 2016	Haleakala	Pan-STARRS 1	·	1.2 km	MPC · JPL
883554	2016 SL_{77}	—	September 27, 2016	Mount Lemmon	Mount Lemmon Survey	·	1.1 km	MPC · JPL
883555	2016 SN_{77}	—	September 25, 2016	Haleakala	Pan-STARRS 1	·	980 m	MPC · JPL
883556	2016 SM_{78}	—	September 25, 2016	Haleakala	Pan-STARRS 1	·	1.2 km	MPC · JPL
883557	2016 SP_{78}	—	September 22, 2003	Kitt Peak	Spacewatch	·	910 m	MPC · JPL
883558	2016 ST_{78}	—	September 27, 2016	Haleakala	Pan-STARRS 1	·	1.1 km	MPC · JPL
883559	2016 SV_{78}	—	September 27, 2016	Haleakala	Pan-STARRS 1	·	1.4 km	MPC · JPL
883560	2016 SF_{79}	—	September 25, 2016	Mount Lemmon	Mount Lemmon Survey	MIS	1.7 km	MPC · JPL
883561	2016 SM_{79}	—	September 27, 2016	Mount Lemmon	Mount Lemmon Survey	·	1.3 km	MPC · JPL
883562	2016 SO_{79}	—	September 25, 2016	Haleakala	Pan-STARRS 1	·	960 m	MPC · JPL
883563	2016 SR_{79}	—	September 25, 2016	Haleakala	Pan-STARRS 1	·	1.3 km	MPC · JPL
883564	2016 SY_{79}	—	September 26, 2016	Haleakala	Pan-STARRS 1	·	950 m	MPC · JPL
883565	2016 SF_{80}	—	September 30, 2016	Haleakala	Pan-STARRS 1	LEO	1.1 km	MPC · JPL
883566	2016 SM_{80}	—	September 25, 2016	Haleakala	Pan-STARRS 1	·	1.2 km	MPC · JPL
883567	2016 SP_{81}	—	September 27, 2016	Mount Lemmon	Mount Lemmon Survey	·	1.1 km	MPC · JPL
883568	2016 SS_{83}	—	September 22, 2016	Mount Lemmon	Mount Lemmon Survey	·	550 m	MPC · JPL
883569	2016 SZ_{86}	—	September 27, 2016	Haleakala	Pan-STARRS 1	·	1.4 km	MPC · JPL
883570	2016 SP_{87}	—	September 25, 2016	Haleakala	Pan-STARRS 1	·	980 m	MPC · JPL
883571	2016 SD_{88}	—	September 25, 2016	Haleakala	Pan-STARRS 1	HNS	720 m	MPC · JPL
883572	2016 SX_{88}	—	September 25, 2016	Mount Lemmon	Mount Lemmon Survey	·	1.1 km	MPC · JPL
883573	2016 SK_{98}	—	September 27, 2016	Haleakala	Pan-STARRS 1	·	1.1 km	MPC · JPL
883574	2016 SQ_{98}	—	September 26, 2016	Haleakala	Pan-STARRS 1	·	1.1 km	MPC · JPL
883575	2016 SH_{107}	—	September 27, 2016	Haleakala	Pan-STARRS 1	·	2.4 km	MPC · JPL
883576	2016 SF_{112}	—	September 27, 2016	Haleakala	Pan-STARRS 1	·	1.0 km	MPC · JPL
883577	2016 SP_{114}	—	September 27, 2016	Haleakala	Pan-STARRS 1	ADE	1.3 km	MPC · JPL
883578	2016 ST_{119}	—	September 26, 2016	Haleakala	Pan-STARRS 1	HYG	1.7 km	MPC · JPL
883579	2016 TH_{2}	—	September 27, 2016	Haleakala	Pan-STARRS 1	·	530 m	MPC · JPL
883580	2016 TL_{3}	—	July 11, 1994	La Silla	H. Debehogne, E. W. Elst	·	1.4 km	MPC · JPL
883581	2016 TV_{3}	—	August 2, 2016	Haleakala	Pan-STARRS 1	·	1.2 km	MPC · JPL
883582	2016 TZ_{3}	—	October 2, 2016	Mount Lemmon	Mount Lemmon Survey	critical	1.3 km	MPC · JPL
883583	2016 TW_{5}	—	June 8, 2011	Mount Lemmon	Mount Lemmon Survey	·	1.2 km	MPC · JPL
883584	2016 TP_{8}	—	October 4, 2007	Catalina	CSS	·	1.1 km	MPC · JPL
883585	2016 TX_{8}	—	September 19, 2007	Kitt Peak	Spacewatch	critical	980 m	MPC · JPL
883586	2016 TO_{13}	—	June 7, 2016	Haleakala	Pan-STARRS 1	·	1.1 km	MPC · JPL
883587	2016 TZ_{14}	—	September 19, 2003	Kitt Peak	Spacewatch	·	1.0 km	MPC · JPL
883588	2016 TZ_{15}	—	September 10, 2016	Mount Lemmon	Mount Lemmon Survey	BRG	1.2 km	MPC · JPL
883589	2016 TM_{16}	—	September 3, 2016	Mount Lemmon	Mount Lemmon Survey	·	980 m	MPC · JPL
883590	2016 TT_{16}	—	September 27, 2016	Mount Lemmon	Mount Lemmon Survey	CLO	1.8 km	MPC · JPL
883591	2016 TD_{17}	—	September 10, 2016	Mount Lemmon	Mount Lemmon Survey	·	1.5 km	MPC · JPL
883592	2016 TW_{17}	—	October 27, 2012	Mount Lemmon	Mount Lemmon Survey	·	1.4 km	MPC · JPL
883593	2016 TF_{28}	—	October 5, 2016	Mount Lemmon	Mount Lemmon Survey	critical	910 m	MPC · JPL
883594	2016 TO_{28}	—	May 10, 2015	Mount Lemmon	Mount Lemmon Survey	·	1.3 km	MPC · JPL
883595	2016 TY_{28}	—	December 21, 2012	Piszkés-tető	K. Sárneczky, G. Hodosán	JUN	760 m	MPC · JPL
883596	2016 TH_{29}	—	October 5, 2016	Mount Lemmon	Mount Lemmon Survey	EUN	810 m	MPC · JPL
883597	2016 TT_{32}	—	October 1, 2016	Mount Lemmon	Mount Lemmon Survey	·	1.1 km	MPC · JPL
883598	2016 TU_{32}	—	April 24, 2015	Haleakala	Pan-STARRS 1	ADE	1.3 km	MPC · JPL
883599	2016 TA_{33}	—	September 19, 2003	Kitt Peak	Spacewatch	·	990 m	MPC · JPL
883600	2016 TL_{39}	—	August 10, 2016	Haleakala	Pan-STARRS 1	·	1.3 km	MPC · JPL

== 883601–883700 ==
back to top

Designation			Discovery			Properties		Ref
Permanent	Provisional	Named after	Date	Site	Discoverer(s)	Category	Diam.	Ref
883601	2016 TC_{45}	—	September 10, 2016	Mount Lemmon	Mount Lemmon Survey	critical	1.1 km	MPC · JPL
883602	2016 TD_{45}	—	September 10, 2016	Mount Lemmon	Mount Lemmon Survey	critical	1.1 km	MPC · JPL
883603	2016 TJ_{47}	—	October 8, 2007	Mount Lemmon	Mount Lemmon Survey	·	1.1 km	MPC · JPL
883604	2016 TA_{48}	—	September 14, 2007	Kitt Peak	Spacewatch	·	1.1 km	MPC · JPL
883605	2016 TH_{48}	—	October 7, 2016	Mount Lemmon	Mount Lemmon Survey	·	1.1 km	MPC · JPL
883606	2016 TR_{50}	—	October 5, 2016	Mount Lemmon	Mount Lemmon Survey	·	1.0 km	MPC · JPL
883607	2016 TA_{56}	—	October 10, 2016	Haleakala	Pan-STARRS 1	T_{j} (2.69) · APO +1km	790 m	MPC · JPL
883608	2016 TG_{57}	—	October 17, 2012	Haleakala	Pan-STARRS 1	·	580 m	MPC · JPL
883609	2016 TB_{59}	—	September 12, 2016	Haleakala	Pan-STARRS 1	WIT	670 m	MPC · JPL
883610	2016 TQ_{65}	—	September 10, 2010	Kitt Peak	Spacewatch	·	2.1 km	MPC · JPL
883611	2016 TL_{66}	—	August 15, 2016	Haleakala	Pan-STARRS 1	ADE	1.4 km	MPC · JPL
883612	2016 TF_{67}	—	August 2, 2016	Haleakala	Pan-STARRS 1	·	1.1 km	MPC · JPL
883613	2016 TJ_{67}	—	December 8, 2012	Kitt Peak	Spacewatch	·	1.2 km	MPC · JPL
883614	2016 TN_{67}	—	November 6, 2012	Mount Lemmon	Mount Lemmon Survey	·	1.1 km	MPC · JPL
883615	2016 TQ_{67}	—	September 4, 2016	Mount Lemmon	Mount Lemmon Survey	·	980 m	MPC · JPL
883616	2016 TF_{70}	—	August 2, 2016	Haleakala	Pan-STARRS 1	(5)	950 m	MPC · JPL
883617	2016 TG_{72}	—	November 19, 2008	Mount Lemmon	Mount Lemmon Survey	JUN	850 m	MPC · JPL
883618	2016 TH_{73}	—	October 9, 2016	Mount Lemmon	Mount Lemmon Survey	·	1.9 km	MPC · JPL
883619	2016 TF_{74}	—	August 4, 2016	Haleakala	Pan-STARRS 1	·	470 m	MPC · JPL
883620	2016 TA_{75}	—	September 14, 2007	Kitt Peak	Spacewatch	·	1.3 km	MPC · JPL
883621	2016 TC_{79}	—	March 19, 2013	Haleakala	Pan-STARRS 1	·	1.0 km	MPC · JPL
883622	2016 TW_{79}	—	December 30, 2013	Mount Lemmon	Mount Lemmon Survey	·	760 m	MPC · JPL
883623	2016 TR_{80}	—	September 27, 2016	Mount Lemmon	Mount Lemmon Survey	·	1.1 km	MPC · JPL
883624	2016 TZ_{80}	—	August 10, 2016	Haleakala	Pan-STARRS 1	critical	1.2 km	MPC · JPL
883625	2016 TC_{83}	—	September 27, 2016	Mount Lemmon	Mount Lemmon Survey	EUN	780 m	MPC · JPL
883626	2016 TT_{85}	—	October 2, 2008	Mount Lemmon	Mount Lemmon Survey	H	340 m	MPC · JPL
883627	2016 TN_{86}	—	August 17, 2016	Haleakala	Pan-STARRS 1	(1547)	950 m	MPC · JPL
883628	2016 TJ_{87}	—	October 10, 2016	Oukaïmeden	C. Rinner	·	1.2 km	MPC · JPL
883629	2016 TR_{88}	—	January 17, 2013	Haleakala	Pan-STARRS 1	·	790 m	MPC · JPL
883630	2016 TP_{89}	—	October 12, 2016	Haleakala	Pan-STARRS 1	EUN	790 m	MPC · JPL
883631	2016 TL_{90}	—	August 21, 2007	Siding Spring	SSS	·	1.1 km	MPC · JPL
883632	2016 TO_{91}	—	November 17, 2009	Catalina	CSS	·	830 m	MPC · JPL
883633	2016 TA_{96}	—	October 4, 2016	Mount Lemmon	Mount Lemmon Survey	·	1.1 km	MPC · JPL
883634	2016 TF_{96}	—	October 5, 2016	Mount Lemmon	Mount Lemmon Survey	·	1.4 km	MPC · JPL
883635	2016 TA_{98}	—	December 21, 2008	Kitt Peak	Spacewatch	·	960 m	MPC · JPL
883636	2016 TF_{98}	—	May 21, 2015	Haleakala	Pan-STARRS 1	EUN	780 m	MPC · JPL
883637	2016 TH_{99}	—	June 10, 2015	Haleakala	Pan-STARRS 1	MAR	700 m	MPC · JPL
883638	2016 TB_{101}	—	October 9, 2016	Kitt Peak	Spacewatch	·	1.3 km	MPC · JPL
883639	2016 TG_{101}	—	October 9, 2016	Mount Lemmon	Mount Lemmon Survey	·	1.5 km	MPC · JPL
883640	2016 TS_{101}	—	October 5, 2016	Mount Lemmon	Mount Lemmon Survey	·	1.1 km	MPC · JPL
883641	2016 TW_{101}	—	October 8, 2016	Haleakala	Pan-STARRS 1	·	1.0 km	MPC · JPL
883642	2016 TY_{101}	—	October 5, 2016	Mount Lemmon	Mount Lemmon Survey	·	1.5 km	MPC · JPL
883643	2016 TL_{102}	—	October 7, 2016	Haleakala	Pan-STARRS 1	GAL	1.2 km	MPC · JPL
883644	2016 TK_{103}	—	October 13, 2016	Haleakala	Pan-STARRS 1	EUN	860 m	MPC · JPL
883645	2016 TT_{103}	—	October 7, 2016	Haleakala	Pan-STARRS 1	·	1.2 km	MPC · JPL
883646	2016 TE_{104}	—	October 2, 2016	Mount Lemmon	Mount Lemmon Survey	·	750 m	MPC · JPL
883647	2016 TO_{104}	—	October 12, 2016	Haleakala	Pan-STARRS 1	EUN	820 m	MPC · JPL
883648	2016 TH_{106}	—	October 12, 2016	Mount Lemmon	Mount Lemmon Survey	·	1.2 km	MPC · JPL
883649	2016 TM_{106}	—	October 8, 2016	Haleakala	Pan-STARRS 1	critical	590 m	MPC · JPL
883650	2016 TN_{106}	—	October 13, 2016	Haleakala	Pan-STARRS 1	·	1.0 km	MPC · JPL
883651	2016 TP_{106}	—	October 9, 2016	Mount Lemmon	Mount Lemmon Survey	·	790 m	MPC · JPL
883652	2016 TY_{106}	—	October 7, 2016	Haleakala	Pan-STARRS 1	·	1.2 km	MPC · JPL
883653	2016 TJ_{108}	—	October 7, 2016	Haleakala	Pan-STARRS 1	·	1.2 km	MPC · JPL
883654	2016 TZ_{108}	—	October 12, 2016	Mount Lemmon	Mount Lemmon Survey	·	1.1 km	MPC · JPL
883655	2016 TM_{110}	—	October 9, 2016	Mount Lemmon	Mount Lemmon Survey	·	880 m	MPC · JPL
883656	2016 TR_{111}	—	October 2, 2016	Mount Lemmon	Mount Lemmon Survey	EUN	730 m	MPC · JPL
883657	2016 TS_{111}	—	October 13, 2016	Mount Lemmon	Mount Lemmon Survey	·	510 m	MPC · JPL
883658	2016 TK_{112}	—	October 10, 2016	Haleakala	Pan-STARRS 1	·	990 m	MPC · JPL
883659	2016 TM_{112}	—	October 11, 2016	Mount Lemmon	Mount Lemmon Survey	·	1.3 km	MPC · JPL
883660	2016 TT_{112}	—	October 12, 2016	Mount Lemmon	Mount Lemmon Survey	EUN	830 m	MPC · JPL
883661	2016 TL_{113}	—	October 14, 2016	Haleakala	Pan-STARRS 1	·	1.1 km	MPC · JPL
883662	2016 TX_{113}	—	October 5, 2016	Mount Lemmon	Mount Lemmon Survey	·	1.3 km	MPC · JPL
883663	2016 TF_{114}	—	October 9, 2016	Mount Lemmon	Mount Lemmon Survey	EUN	730 m	MPC · JPL
883664	2016 TH_{114}	—	October 1, 2016	Mount Lemmon	Mount Lemmon Survey	·	570 m	MPC · JPL
883665	2016 TY_{114}	—	October 4, 2016	Mount Lemmon	Mount Lemmon Survey	AGN · critical	790 m	MPC · JPL
883666	2016 TL_{115}	—	October 5, 2016	Mount Lemmon	Mount Lemmon Survey	critical	1.5 km	MPC · JPL
883667	2016 TM_{115}	—	October 9, 2016	Mount Lemmon	Mount Lemmon Survey	·	1.3 km	MPC · JPL
883668	2016 TO_{115}	—	October 7, 2016	Haleakala	Pan-STARRS 1	(18466)	1.5 km	MPC · JPL
883669	2016 TN_{116}	—	October 7, 2016	Mount Lemmon	Mount Lemmon Survey	·	1.4 km	MPC · JPL
883670	2016 TQ_{116}	—	October 7, 2016	Haleakala	Pan-STARRS 1	·	970 m	MPC · JPL
883671	2016 TD_{117}	—	October 12, 2016	Mount Lemmon	Mount Lemmon Survey	·	860 m	MPC · JPL
883672	2016 TW_{117}	—	October 7, 2016	Haleakala	Pan-STARRS 1	·	550 m	MPC · JPL
883673	2016 TD_{118}	—	October 7, 2016	Mount Lemmon	Mount Lemmon Survey	·	1.4 km	MPC · JPL
883674	2016 TX_{120}	—	October 2, 2016	Mount Lemmon	Mount Lemmon Survey	·	1.0 km	MPC · JPL
883675	2016 TM_{124}	—	October 4, 2016	Mount Lemmon	Mount Lemmon Survey	·	1.1 km	MPC · JPL
883676	2016 TP_{124}	—	October 12, 2016	Haleakala	Pan-STARRS 1	·	1.4 km	MPC · JPL
883677	2016 TV_{124}	—	October 2, 2016	Mount Lemmon	Mount Lemmon Survey	·	1.3 km	MPC · JPL
883678	2016 TE_{125}	—	December 30, 2008	Kitt Peak	Spacewatch	·	1.2 km	MPC · JPL
883679	2016 TM_{125}	—	October 2, 2016	Mount Lemmon	Mount Lemmon Survey	·	880 m	MPC · JPL
883680	2016 TN_{125}	—	October 9, 2016	Haleakala	Pan-STARRS 1	EUN	840 m	MPC · JPL
883681	2016 TU_{127}	—	October 12, 2016	Mount Lemmon	Mount Lemmon Survey	·	1.1 km	MPC · JPL
883682	2016 TF_{128}	—	October 6, 2016	Haleakala	Pan-STARRS 1	GEF · critical	890 m	MPC · JPL
883683	2016 TO_{128}	—	October 7, 2016	Haleakala	Pan-STARRS 1	·	1.3 km	MPC · JPL
883684	2016 TS_{128}	—	October 8, 2016	Haleakala	Pan-STARRS 1	·	1.1 km	MPC · JPL
883685	2016 TD_{129}	—	October 10, 2016	Haleakala	Pan-STARRS 1	EUN	790 m	MPC · JPL
883686	2016 TS_{129}	—	October 7, 2016	Mount Lemmon	Mount Lemmon Survey	·	1.2 km	MPC · JPL
883687	2016 TV_{129}	—	October 10, 2016	Mount Lemmon	Mount Lemmon Survey	·	1.3 km	MPC · JPL
883688	2016 TW_{129}	—	October 10, 2016	Mount Lemmon	Mount Lemmon Survey	·	1.3 km	MPC · JPL
883689	2016 TB_{130}	—	October 12, 2016	Mount Lemmon	Mount Lemmon Survey	·	1.1 km	MPC · JPL
883690	2016 TE_{130}	—	October 7, 2016	Haleakala	Pan-STARRS 1	·	1.1 km	MPC · JPL
883691	2016 TM_{131}	—	October 8, 2016	Mount Lemmon	Mount Lemmon Survey	·	1.4 km	MPC · JPL
883692	2016 TN_{131}	—	October 5, 2016	Mount Lemmon	Mount Lemmon Survey	·	1.2 km	MPC · JPL
883693	2016 TS_{131}	—	October 7, 2016	Haleakala	Pan-STARRS 1	·	1.2 km	MPC · JPL
883694	2016 TU_{131}	—	October 12, 2016	Haleakala	Pan-STARRS 1	·	1.2 km	MPC · JPL
883695	2016 TV_{131}	—	October 13, 2016	Haleakala	Pan-STARRS 1	·	1.7 km	MPC · JPL
883696	2016 TD_{132}	—	October 14, 2007	Catalina	CSS	·	990 m	MPC · JPL
883697	2016 TK_{132}	—	October 13, 2007	Mount Lemmon	Mount Lemmon Survey	NEM	1.5 km	MPC · JPL
883698	2016 TY_{132}	—	October 10, 2016	Haleakala	Pan-STARRS 1	·	1.5 km	MPC · JPL
883699	2016 TB_{133}	—	October 13, 2016	Mount Lemmon	Mount Lemmon Survey	·	1.2 km	MPC · JPL
883700	2016 TT_{137}	—	October 10, 2016	Haleakala	Pan-STARRS 1	·	940 m	MPC · JPL

== 883701–883800 ==
back to top

Designation			Discovery			Properties		Ref
Permanent	Provisional	Named after	Date	Site	Discoverer(s)	Category	Diam.	Ref
883701	2016 TZ_{137}	—	October 12, 2016	Mount Lemmon	Mount Lemmon Survey	·	1.2 km	MPC · JPL
883702	2016 TH_{139}	—	October 10, 2016	Mount Lemmon	Mount Lemmon Survey	·	1.1 km	MPC · JPL
883703	2016 TQ_{139}	—	October 12, 2016	Haleakala	Pan-STARRS 1	EUN	780 m	MPC · JPL
883704	2016 TR_{139}	—	October 7, 2016	Haleakala	Pan-STARRS 1	·	910 m	MPC · JPL
883705	2016 TV_{139}	—	October 2, 2016	Mount Lemmon	Mount Lemmon Survey	·	960 m	MPC · JPL
883706	2016 TE_{140}	—	October 8, 2016	Haleakala	Pan-STARRS 1	·	1.0 km	MPC · JPL
883707	2016 TP_{140}	—	October 10, 2016	Haleakala	Pan-STARRS 1	·	1.1 km	MPC · JPL
883708	2016 TU_{140}	—	October 7, 2016	Haleakala	Pan-STARRS 1	·	1.1 km	MPC · JPL
883709	2016 TQ_{141}	—	October 13, 2016	Haleakala	Pan-STARRS 1	ADE	1.2 km	MPC · JPL
883710	2016 TH_{142}	—	October 10, 2016	Haleakala	Pan-STARRS 1	EUN	690 m	MPC · JPL
883711	2016 TU_{142}	—	October 4, 2016	Mount Lemmon	Mount Lemmon Survey	·	820 m	MPC · JPL
883712	2016 TS_{143}	—	October 6, 2016	Haleakala	Pan-STARRS 1	·	820 m	MPC · JPL
883713	2016 TB_{144}	—	October 5, 2016	Mount Lemmon	Mount Lemmon Survey	·	1.2 km	MPC · JPL
883714	2016 TN_{144}	—	October 6, 2016	Haleakala	Pan-STARRS 1	·	930 m	MPC · JPL
883715	2016 TS_{144}	—	October 9, 2016	Mount Lemmon	Mount Lemmon Survey	·	1.1 km	MPC · JPL
883716	2016 TW_{144}	—	October 2, 2016	Haleakala	Pan-STARRS 1	·	1.3 km	MPC · JPL
883717	2016 TT_{145}	—	October 8, 2016	Haleakala	Pan-STARRS 1	MAR	600 m	MPC · JPL
883718	2016 TF_{146}	—	October 8, 2016	Haleakala	Pan-STARRS 1	·	750 m	MPC · JPL
883719	2016 TQ_{147}	—	October 7, 2016	Haleakala	Pan-STARRS 1	EUN	590 m	MPC · JPL
883720	2016 TS_{148}	—	October 12, 2016	Mount Lemmon	Mount Lemmon Survey	·	770 m	MPC · JPL
883721	2016 TW_{150}	—	October 6, 2016	Haleakala	Pan-STARRS 1	·	960 m	MPC · JPL
883722	2016 TV_{151}	—	October 7, 2016	Mount Lemmon	Mount Lemmon Survey	·	970 m	MPC · JPL
883723	2016 TD_{152}	—	October 13, 2016	Haleakala	Pan-STARRS 1	·	790 m	MPC · JPL
883724	2016 TE_{152}	—	October 6, 2016	Mount Lemmon	Mount Lemmon Survey	HNS	780 m	MPC · JPL
883725	2016 TJ_{152}	—	October 12, 2016	Mount Lemmon	Mount Lemmon Survey	·	1.1 km	MPC · JPL
883726	2016 TV_{153}	—	October 7, 2016	Mount Lemmon	Mount Lemmon Survey	·	840 m	MPC · JPL
883727	2016 TD_{155}	—	October 4, 2016	Mount Lemmon	Mount Lemmon Survey	·	2.1 km	MPC · JPL
883728	2016 TQ_{155}	—	October 12, 2016	Kitt Peak	Spacewatch	·	580 m	MPC · JPL
883729	2016 TW_{162}	—	October 6, 2016	Haleakala	Pan-STARRS 1	EUN	850 m	MPC · JPL
883730	2016 TV_{163}	—	October 9, 2016	Kitt Peak	Spacewatch	·	1.1 km	MPC · JPL
883731	2016 TC_{165}	—	October 12, 2016	Haleakala	Pan-STARRS 1	EUN	790 m	MPC · JPL
883732	2016 TB_{176}	—	October 1, 2016	Mount Lemmon	Mount Lemmon Survey	H	310 m	MPC · JPL
883733	2016 TH_{177}	—	October 10, 2016	Mount Lemmon	Mount Lemmon Survey	·	1.2 km	MPC · JPL
883734	2016 TV_{183}	—	October 7, 2016	Haleakala	Pan-STARRS 1	HNS	1.0 km	MPC · JPL
883735	2016 TC_{189}	—	October 10, 2016	Haleakala	Pan-STARRS 1	·	900 m	MPC · JPL
883736	2016 TK_{191}	—	October 6, 2016	Mount Lemmon	Mount Lemmon Survey	·	910 m	MPC · JPL
883737	2016 TM_{207}	—	October 9, 2016	Haleakala	Pan-STARRS 1	·	710 m	MPC · JPL
883738	2016 TA_{208}	—	September 5, 2016	Mount Lemmon	Mount Lemmon Survey	·	960 m	MPC · JPL
883739	2016 TL_{208}	—	October 7, 2016	Haleakala	Pan-STARRS 1	·	1.2 km	MPC · JPL
883740	2016 TF_{212}	—	October 8, 2016	Haleakala	Pan-STARRS 1	·	980 m	MPC · JPL
883741	2016 UF	—	February 5, 2009	Catalina	CSS	·	1.3 km	MPC · JPL
883742	2016 UG_{1}	—	September 4, 2007	Mount Lemmon	Mount Lemmon Survey	·	1.4 km	MPC · JPL
883743	2016 UK_{2}	—	October 19, 2016	Mount Lemmon	Mount Lemmon Survey	·	970 m	MPC · JPL
883744	2016 UP_{8}	—	September 6, 2016	Mount Lemmon	Mount Lemmon Survey	·	1.4 km	MPC · JPL
883745	2016 UV_{8}	—	August 2, 2016	Haleakala	Pan-STARRS 1	critical	1.2 km	MPC · JPL
883746	2016 UX_{12}	—	September 22, 2003	Anderson Mesa	LONEOS	·	1.2 km	MPC · JPL
883747	2016 UW_{13}	—	August 10, 2016	Haleakala	Pan-STARRS 1	·	1.3 km	MPC · JPL
883748	2016 UZ_{18}	—	September 12, 2016	Haleakala	Pan-STARRS 1	·	440 m	MPC · JPL
883749	2016 UL_{19}	—	July 30, 2016	Haleakala	Pan-STARRS 1	·	1.5 km	MPC · JPL
883750	2016 UW_{21}	—	September 30, 2016	Haleakala	Pan-STARRS 1	EUN	770 m	MPC · JPL
883751	2016 UX_{21}	—	October 12, 2016	Kitt Peak	Spacewatch	·	1.2 km	MPC · JPL
883752	2016 UX_{22}	—	August 16, 2009	La Sagra	OAM	·	510 m	MPC · JPL
883753	2016 UQ_{23}	—	October 22, 2003	Sacramento Peak	SDSS	·	840 m	MPC · JPL
883754	2016 UR_{25}	—	December 9, 2012	Catalina	CSS	·	1.2 km	MPC · JPL
883755	2016 UT_{25}	—	December 26, 2005	Mount Lemmon	Mount Lemmon Survey	·	900 m	MPC · JPL
883756	2016 US_{27}	—	December 13, 2012	Mount Lemmon	Mount Lemmon Survey	·	1.1 km	MPC · JPL
883757	2016 UB_{29}	—	July 8, 2003	Kitt Peak	Spacewatch	·	1.2 km	MPC · JPL
883758	2016 UF_{29}	—	October 5, 2016	Mount Lemmon	Mount Lemmon Survey	EUN	770 m	MPC · JPL
883759	2016 UO_{29}	—	October 4, 2016	XuYi	PMO NEO Survey Program	PHO	680 m	MPC · JPL
883760	2016 UF_{32}	—	September 6, 2016	Mount Lemmon	Mount Lemmon Survey	·	1.6 km	MPC · JPL
883761	2016 UH_{33}	—	October 12, 2016	Mount Lemmon	Mount Lemmon Survey	·	1.1 km	MPC · JPL
883762	2016 UE_{34}	—	October 2, 2016	Mount Lemmon	Mount Lemmon Survey	·	940 m	MPC · JPL
883763	2016 UP_{34}	—	October 7, 2016	Haleakala	Pan-STARRS 1	·	730 m	MPC · JPL
883764	2016 UB_{38}	—	October 19, 2016	Haleakala	Pan-STARRS 1	·	920 m	MPC · JPL
883765	2016 UE_{40}	—	September 27, 2003	Kitt Peak	Spacewatch	EUN	740 m	MPC · JPL
883766	2016 UH_{46}	—	October 13, 2016	Mount Lemmon	Mount Lemmon Survey	MAR	870 m	MPC · JPL
883767	2016 UU_{48}	—	October 21, 2016	Mount Lemmon	Mount Lemmon Survey	·	1.0 km	MPC · JPL
883768	2016 UD_{50}	—	October 25, 2016	Haleakala	Pan-STARRS 1	·	1.2 km	MPC · JPL
883769	2016 UB_{51}	—	October 24, 2016	Mount Lemmon	Mount Lemmon Survey	·	1.2 km	MPC · JPL
883770	2016 UZ_{51}	—	October 4, 2016	Mount Lemmon	Mount Lemmon Survey	·	940 m	MPC · JPL
883771	2016 UF_{53}	—	October 25, 2016	Haleakala	Pan-STARRS 1	·	1.5 km	MPC · JPL
883772	2016 US_{54}	—	October 12, 2016	Haleakala	Pan-STARRS 1	DOR	1.4 km	MPC · JPL
883773	2016 UF_{56}	—	October 26, 2016	Haleakala	Pan-STARRS 1	(5)	1.0 km	MPC · JPL
883774	2016 US_{56}	—	October 26, 2016	Haleakala	Pan-STARRS 1	·	1.1 km	MPC · JPL
883775	2016 UH_{59}	—	September 22, 2016	Mount Lemmon	Mount Lemmon Survey	·	1.1 km	MPC · JPL
883776	2016 UX_{60}	—	September 26, 2016	Haleakala	Pan-STARRS 1	·	970 m	MPC · JPL
883777	2016 UO_{62}	—	December 23, 2012	Haleakala	Pan-STARRS 1	·	1.4 km	MPC · JPL
883778	2016 UE_{64}	—	November 6, 2012	Kitt Peak	Spacewatch	·	950 m	MPC · JPL
883779	2016 UP_{64}	—	September 26, 2016	Haleakala	Pan-STARRS 1	·	970 m	MPC · JPL
883780	2016 UD_{65}	—	September 13, 2007	Mount Lemmon	Mount Lemmon Survey	·	930 m	MPC · JPL
883781	2016 UP_{65}	—	October 26, 2016	Mount Lemmon	Mount Lemmon Survey	·	1.0 km	MPC · JPL
883782	2016 UJ_{68}	—	October 13, 2016	Mount Lemmon	Mount Lemmon Survey	DOR	1.7 km	MPC · JPL
883783	2016 UU_{69}	—	September 30, 2016	Haleakala	Pan-STARRS 1	·	970 m	MPC · JPL
883784	2016 UM_{71}	—	September 30, 2016	Haleakala	Pan-STARRS 1	·	1.2 km	MPC · JPL
883785	2016 UV_{71}	—	September 30, 2016	Haleakala	Pan-STARRS 1	(1547)	840 m	MPC · JPL
883786	2016 UC_{72}	—	February 23, 2009	Calar Alto	F. Hormuth	·	830 m	MPC · JPL
883787	2016 UA_{74}	—	October 20, 2016	Mount Lemmon	Mount Lemmon Survey	·	1.2 km	MPC · JPL
883788	2016 UE_{85}	—	October 30, 2007	Mount Lemmon	Mount Lemmon Survey	·	1.1 km	MPC · JPL
883789	2016 UM_{85}	—	October 26, 2016	Haleakala	Pan-STARRS 1	·	1.3 km	MPC · JPL
883790	2016 UW_{87}	—	November 2, 2007	Mount Lemmon	Mount Lemmon Survey	·	680 m	MPC · JPL
883791	2016 UQ_{88}	—	October 10, 2016	Mount Lemmon	Mount Lemmon Survey	·	850 m	MPC · JPL
883792	2016 UJ_{89}	—	October 10, 2016	Mount Lemmon	Mount Lemmon Survey	·	820 m	MPC · JPL
883793	2016 UF_{90}	—	October 12, 2016	Mount Lemmon	Mount Lemmon Survey	MAR	750 m	MPC · JPL
883794	2016 UG_{90}	—	October 25, 2016	Haleakala	Pan-STARRS 1	·	1.1 km	MPC · JPL
883795	2016 UD_{93}	—	October 12, 2016	Mount Lemmon	Mount Lemmon Survey	WIT	610 m	MPC · JPL
883796	2016 UH_{94}	—	October 26, 2016	Haleakala	Pan-STARRS 1	·	790 m	MPC · JPL
883797	2016 UG_{98}	—	October 22, 2016	Kitt Peak	Spacewatch	HOF	1.5 km	MPC · JPL
883798	2016 UQ_{98}	—	November 1, 2007	Mount Lemmon	Mount Lemmon Survey	critical	1 km	MPC · JPL
883799	2016 UM_{99}	—	October 2, 2016	Mount Lemmon	Mount Lemmon Survey	DOR · critical	1.6 km	MPC · JPL
883800	2016 UO_{100}	—	October 22, 2016	Kitt Peak	Spacewatch	·	1.0 km	MPC · JPL

== 883801–883900 ==
back to top

Designation			Discovery			Properties		Ref
Permanent	Provisional	Named after	Date	Site	Discoverer(s)	Category	Diam.	Ref
883801	2016 UJ_{101}	—	October 31, 2016	Space Surveillance	Space Surveillance Telescope	APO · fast	280 m	MPC · JPL
883802	2016 UM_{101}	—	October 10, 2016	Mount Lemmon	Mount Lemmon Survey	·	1.1 km	MPC · JPL
883803	2016 UZ_{102}	—	October 26, 2016	Haleakala	Pan-STARRS 1	·	1.1 km	MPC · JPL
883804	2016 UM_{103}	—	October 26, 2016	Haleakala	Pan-STARRS 1	·	1.0 km	MPC · JPL
883805	2016 UX_{104}	—	October 21, 2016	Mount Lemmon	Mount Lemmon Survey	·	1.1 km	MPC · JPL
883806	2016 UM_{108}	—	October 20, 2003	Kitt Peak	Spacewatch	·	1.2 km	MPC · JPL
883807	2016 UO_{108}	—	October 6, 2016	Haleakala	Pan-STARRS 1	3:2 · SHU	3.7 km	MPC · JPL
883808	2016 UL_{110}	—	September 30, 2016	Haleakala	Pan-STARRS 1	V	350 m	MPC · JPL
883809	2016 UM_{112}	—	October 27, 2016	Mount Lemmon	Mount Lemmon Survey	·	810 m	MPC · JPL
883810	2016 UB_{114}	—	October 26, 2016	Haleakala	Pan-STARRS 1	·	1.1 km	MPC · JPL
883811	2016 UA_{115}	—	October 27, 2016	Haleakala	Pan-STARRS 1	·	810 m	MPC · JPL
883812	2016 UV_{117}	—	October 21, 2016	Mount Lemmon	Mount Lemmon Survey	·	880 m	MPC · JPL
883813	2016 UG_{119}	—	September 14, 2007	Mount Lemmon	Mount Lemmon Survey	·	1.1 km	MPC · JPL
883814	2016 UQ_{119}	—	October 20, 2016	Mount Lemmon	Mount Lemmon Survey	·	1.2 km	MPC · JPL
883815	2016 UL_{121}	—	October 27, 2016	Haleakala	Pan-STARRS 1	BRG	1.0 km	MPC · JPL
883816	2016 UN_{123}	—	October 27, 2016	Haleakala	Pan-STARRS 1	GEF	890 m	MPC · JPL
883817	2016 UQ_{124}	—	October 19, 2016	Mount Lemmon	Mount Lemmon Survey	·	1.0 km	MPC · JPL
883818	2016 UA_{125}	—	October 26, 2016	Haleakala	Pan-STARRS 1	·	1.2 km	MPC · JPL
883819	2016 UE_{126}	—	February 3, 2009	Kitt Peak	Spacewatch	·	1.2 km	MPC · JPL
883820	2016 UR_{126}	—	October 12, 2007	Kitt Peak	Spacewatch	·	1.2 km	MPC · JPL
883821	2016 UF_{127}	—	October 18, 2012	Haleakala	Pan-STARRS 1	·	720 m	MPC · JPL
883822	2016 UO_{129}	—	October 27, 2016	Kitt Peak	Spacewatch	·	1.3 km	MPC · JPL
883823	2016 UJ_{130}	—	October 26, 2016	Haleakala	Pan-STARRS 1	HOF	1.7 km	MPC · JPL
883824	2016 UM_{131}	—	October 27, 2016	Haleakala	Pan-STARRS 1	3:2	2.9 km	MPC · JPL
883825	2016 UX_{131}	—	October 27, 2016	Mount Lemmon	Mount Lemmon Survey	·	790 m	MPC · JPL
883826	2016 UN_{132}	—	October 27, 2016	Haleakala	Pan-STARRS 1	AEO	550 m	MPC · JPL
883827	2016 UU_{133}	—	October 27, 2016	Haleakala	Pan-STARRS 1	AGN	650 m	MPC · JPL
883828	2016 UG_{134}	—	October 27, 2016	Haleakala	Pan-STARRS 1	·	1.1 km	MPC · JPL
883829	2016 UO_{134}	—	August 20, 2011	Haleakala	Pan-STARRS 1	·	1.2 km	MPC · JPL
883830	2016 UD_{137}	—	October 27, 2016	Haleakala	Pan-STARRS 1	·	1.4 km	MPC · JPL
883831	2016 UF_{137}	—	October 27, 2016	Haleakala	Pan-STARRS 1	·	940 m	MPC · JPL
883832	2016 UM_{140}	—	October 2, 2016	Mount Lemmon	Mount Lemmon Survey	JUN	580 m	MPC · JPL
883833	2016 UV_{140}	—	September 30, 2016	Haleakala	Pan-STARRS 1	·	1.3 km	MPC · JPL
883834	2016 UH_{141}	—	October 9, 2016	Haleakala	Pan-STARRS 1	·	1.1 km	MPC · JPL
883835	2016 UQ_{145}	—	October 19, 2003	Kitt Peak	Spacewatch	·	1.3 km	MPC · JPL
883836	2016 UB_{151}	—	October 23, 2016	Haleakala	Pan-STARRS 1	H	570 m	MPC · JPL
883837	2016 UJ_{151}	—	October 26, 2016	Mount Lemmon	Mount Lemmon Survey	EUN	940 m	MPC · JPL
883838	2016 UL_{152}	—	October 29, 2016	Mount Lemmon	Mount Lemmon Survey	·	1.7 km	MPC · JPL
883839	2016 UD_{153}	—	October 25, 2016	Haleakala	Pan-STARRS 1	·	1.2 km	MPC · JPL
883840	2016 UF_{156}	—	October 31, 2016	Haleakala	Pan-STARRS 1	AGN · critical	610 m	MPC · JPL
883841	2016 UC_{161}	—	May 14, 2015	Cerro Paranal	Gaia Ground Based Optical Tracking	·	450 m	MPC · JPL
883842	2016 UU_{165}	—	October 12, 2016	Mount Lemmon	Mount Lemmon Survey	·	2.1 km	MPC · JPL
883843	2016 UM_{168}	—	January 17, 2013	Haleakala	Pan-STARRS 1	·	740 m	MPC · JPL
883844	2016 UQ_{168}	—	April 7, 2019	Haleakala	Pan-STARRS 1	·	800 m	MPC · JPL
883845	2016 UQ_{171}	—	May 1, 2019	Haleakala	Pan-STARRS 1	HOF	1.7 km	MPC · JPL
883846	2016 UA_{172}	—	April 23, 2014	Cerro Tololo	DECam	·	1.3 km	MPC · JPL
883847	2016 UD_{172}	—	October 26, 2016	Haleakala	Pan-STARRS 1	AGN	690 m	MPC · JPL
883848	2016 UC_{174}	—	October 27, 2016	Haleakala	Pan-STARRS 1	critical · fast	970 m	MPC · JPL
883849	2016 UA_{179}	—	October 26, 2016	Haleakala	Pan-STARRS 1	·	890 m	MPC · JPL
883850	2016 UP_{179}	—	October 26, 2016	Haleakala	Pan-STARRS 1	critical · fast	720 m	MPC · JPL
883851	2016 UR_{182}	—	October 26, 2016	Haleakala	Pan-STARRS 1	·	1.3 km	MPC · JPL
883852	2016 UR_{183}	—	January 2, 2009	Kitt Peak	Spacewatch	·	900 m	MPC · JPL
883853	2016 UF_{184}	—	May 21, 2015	Cerro Tololo	DECam	·	750 m	MPC · JPL
883854	2016 US_{199}	—	June 22, 2015	Haleakala	Pan-STARRS 1	AGN	690 m	MPC · JPL
883855	2016 UQ_{200}	—	April 24, 2014	Cerro Tololo	DECam	·	820 m	MPC · JPL
883856	2016 UF_{201}	—	October 21, 2016	Mount Lemmon	Mount Lemmon Survey	critical	900 m	MPC · JPL
883857	2016 UT_{204}	—	April 21, 2015	Cerro Tololo	DECam	MAS	370 m	MPC · JPL
883858	2016 UK_{206}	—	October 26, 2016	Haleakala	Pan-STARRS 1	·	760 m	MPC · JPL
883859	2016 US_{210}	—	March 20, 2014	Mount Lemmon	Mount Lemmon Survey	·	770 m	MPC · JPL
883860	2016 UJ_{214}	—	May 26, 2015	Haleakala	Pan-STARRS 1	DOR	1.3 km	MPC · JPL
883861	2016 UD_{215}	—	May 1, 2019	Haleakala	Pan-STARRS 1	·	850 m	MPC · JPL
883862	2016 UC_{228}	—	October 26, 2016	Haleakala	Pan-STARRS 1	·	1.0 km	MPC · JPL
883863	2016 UE_{228}	—	October 26, 2016	Haleakala	Pan-STARRS 1	RAF	550 m	MPC · JPL
883864	2016 UG_{228}	—	April 23, 2014	Cerro Tololo-DECam	DECam	·	1.2 km	MPC · JPL
883865	2016 UG_{230}	—	April 6, 2019	Haleakala	Pan-STARRS 1	·	880 m	MPC · JPL
883866	2016 UZ_{234}	—	April 23, 2014	Cerro Tololo	DECam	·	710 m	MPC · JPL
883867	2016 UB_{235}	—	June 20, 2015	Haleakala	Pan-STARRS 1	·	830 m	MPC · JPL
883868	2016 UP_{249}	—	October 24, 2016	Mount Lemmon	Mount Lemmon Survey	·	1.3 km	MPC · JPL
883869	2016 UB_{250}	—	October 22, 2003	Kitt Peak	Spacewatch	·	1.0 km	MPC · JPL
883870	2016 UG_{250}	—	October 25, 2016	Haleakala	Pan-STARRS 1	·	1.3 km	MPC · JPL
883871	2016 UO_{250}	—	October 24, 2016	Mount Lemmon	Mount Lemmon Survey	ADE	1.3 km	MPC · JPL
883872	2016 UA_{251}	—	October 30, 2016	Mount Lemmon	Mount Lemmon Survey	·	980 m	MPC · JPL
883873	2016 UD_{251}	—	October 26, 2016	Mount Lemmon	Mount Lemmon Survey	·	1.1 km	MPC · JPL
883874	2016 UJ_{251}	—	October 21, 2016	Mount Lemmon	Mount Lemmon Survey	·	1.3 km	MPC · JPL
883875	2016 UP_{251}	—	October 19, 2016	Mount Lemmon	Mount Lemmon Survey	·	1.4 km	MPC · JPL
883876	2016 UQ_{251}	—	September 4, 2016	Mount Lemmon	Mount Lemmon Survey	EUN	710 m	MPC · JPL
883877	2016 UD_{254}	—	October 26, 2016	Mount Lemmon	Mount Lemmon Survey	·	800 m	MPC · JPL
883878	2016 UR_{254}	—	October 25, 2016	Haleakala	Pan-STARRS 1	·	1.0 km	MPC · JPL
883879	2016 UA_{255}	—	October 12, 2016	Mount Lemmon	Mount Lemmon Survey	·	1.2 km	MPC · JPL
883880	2016 UY_{255}	—	October 20, 2016	Mount Lemmon	Mount Lemmon Survey	EUN	910 m	MPC · JPL
883881	2016 UO_{256}	—	October 25, 2016	Haleakala	Pan-STARRS 1	·	1.4 km	MPC · JPL
883882	2016 UE_{257}	—	October 22, 2016	Mount Lemmon	Mount Lemmon Survey	·	870 m	MPC · JPL
883883	2016 UC_{258}	—	October 20, 2016	Mount Lemmon	Mount Lemmon Survey	·	1.1 km	MPC · JPL
883884	2016 UE_{258}	—	October 22, 2016	Mount Lemmon	Mount Lemmon Survey	MAR	840 m	MPC · JPL
883885	2016 UU_{258}	—	November 12, 2012	Haleakala	Pan-STARRS 1	·	680 m	MPC · JPL
883886	2016 UA_{259}	—	October 25, 2016	Haleakala	Pan-STARRS 1	·	920 m	MPC · JPL
883887	2016 UN_{259}	—	October 26, 2016	Mount Lemmon	Mount Lemmon Survey	(5)	1.1 km	MPC · JPL
883888	2016 UO_{259}	—	October 27, 2016	Mount Lemmon	Mount Lemmon Survey	·	640 m	MPC · JPL
883889	2016 UE_{261}	—	October 19, 2016	Mount Lemmon	Mount Lemmon Survey	MAR	730 m	MPC · JPL
883890	2016 UM_{261}	—	October 30, 2016	Mount Lemmon	Mount Lemmon Survey	BAR	1.2 km	MPC · JPL
883891	2016 UW_{265}	—	October 20, 2016	Mount Lemmon	Mount Lemmon Survey	·	1.3 km	MPC · JPL
883892	2016 UW_{279}	—	October 29, 2016	Mount Lemmon	Mount Lemmon Survey	GAL	1.2 km	MPC · JPL
883893	2016 UX_{280}	—	October 25, 2016	Haleakala	Pan-STARRS 1	·	940 m	MPC · JPL
883894	2016 UJ_{281}	—	October 21, 2016	Mount Lemmon	Mount Lemmon Survey	·	1.2 km	MPC · JPL
883895	2016 UR_{281}	—	October 21, 2016	Mount Lemmon	Mount Lemmon Survey	·	980 m	MPC · JPL
883896	2016 UR_{283}	—	October 21, 2016	Mount Lemmon	Mount Lemmon Survey	·	1.6 km	MPC · JPL
883897	2016 VJ	—	August 29, 2016	Kitt Peak	Spacewatch	·	840 m	MPC · JPL
883898	2016 VO	—	July 22, 2003	Haleakala	NEAT	·	530 m	MPC · JPL
883899	2016 VP_{5}	—	September 25, 2016	Haleakala	Pan-STARRS 1	·	1.4 km	MPC · JPL
883900	2016 VO_{8}	—	September 30, 2003	Kitt Peak	Spacewatch	·	680 m	MPC · JPL

== 883901–884000 ==
back to top

Designation			Discovery			Properties		Ref
Permanent	Provisional	Named after	Date	Site	Discoverer(s)	Category	Diam.	Ref
883901	2016 VO_{9}	—	October 4, 2016	Mount Lemmon	Mount Lemmon Survey	·	1.1 km	MPC · JPL
883902	2016 VN_{11}	—	November 2, 2007	Mount Lemmon	Mount Lemmon Survey	·	980 m	MPC · JPL
883903	2016 VP_{12}	—	October 7, 2016	Mount Lemmon	Mount Lemmon Survey	ADE	1.1 km	MPC · JPL
883904	2016 VR_{18}	—	August 17, 2016	Haleakala	Pan-STARRS 1	·	1.1 km	MPC · JPL
883905	2016 VX_{21}	—	November 3, 2016	Haleakala	Pan-STARRS 1	·	1.0 km	MPC · JPL
883906	2016 VB_{23}	—	November 4, 2016	Haleakala	Pan-STARRS 1	·	650 m	MPC · JPL
883907	2016 VU_{23}	—	November 6, 2016	Mount Lemmon	Mount Lemmon Survey	·	2.0 km	MPC · JPL
883908	2016 VA_{24}	—	November 9, 2016	Mount Lemmon	Mount Lemmon Survey	·	900 m	MPC · JPL
883909	2016 VD_{24}	—	November 3, 2016	Haleakala	Pan-STARRS 1	KON	1.8 km	MPC · JPL
883910	2016 VX_{24}	—	November 11, 2016	Mount Lemmon	Mount Lemmon Survey	·	1.0 km	MPC · JPL
883911	2016 VL_{25}	—	October 30, 2016	Catalina	CSS	·	1.4 km	MPC · JPL
883912	2016 VY_{25}	—	November 10, 2016	Haleakala	Pan-STARRS 1	·	1.2 km	MPC · JPL
883913	2016 VT_{29}	—	November 4, 2016	Haleakala	Pan-STARRS 1	·	1.3 km	MPC · JPL
883914	2016 VX_{30}	—	November 3, 2016	Haleakala	Pan-STARRS 1	·	1.0 km	MPC · JPL
883915	2016 VD_{31}	—	November 9, 2016	Mount Lemmon	Mount Lemmon Survey	JUN	650 m	MPC · JPL
883916	2016 VK_{31}	—	November 8, 2016	Mount Lemmon	Mount Lemmon Survey	·	1.4 km	MPC · JPL
883917	2016 VQ_{31}	—	November 7, 2016	Haleakala	Pan-STARRS 1	·	1.0 km	MPC · JPL
883918	2016 VV_{31}	—	November 4, 2016	Haleakala	Pan-STARRS 1	·	1.1 km	MPC · JPL
883919	2016 VD_{32}	—	November 6, 2016	Haleakala	Pan-STARRS 1	·	1.6 km	MPC · JPL
883920	2016 VE_{32}	—	November 5, 2016	Mount Lemmon	Mount Lemmon Survey	HNS	890 m	MPC · JPL
883921	2016 VY_{32}	—	November 5, 2016	Haleakala	Pan-STARRS 1	·	2.1 km	MPC · JPL
883922	2016 VZ_{32}	—	November 6, 2016	Mount Lemmon	Mount Lemmon Survey	·	1.0 km	MPC · JPL
883923	2016 VG_{33}	—	November 4, 2016	Haleakala	Pan-STARRS 1	MRX	630 m	MPC · JPL
883924	2016 VT_{34}	—	November 8, 2016	Mount Lemmon	Mount Lemmon Survey	·	960 m	MPC · JPL
883925	2016 VZ_{34}	—	November 6, 2016	Mount Lemmon	Mount Lemmon Survey	·	1.0 km	MPC · JPL
883926	2016 VE_{35}	—	September 15, 2007	Mount Lemmon	Mount Lemmon Survey	·	1.1 km	MPC · JPL
883927	2016 VN_{35}	—	November 5, 2016	Mount Lemmon	Mount Lemmon Survey	EUN	720 m	MPC · JPL
883928	2016 VQ_{36}	—	November 6, 2016	Mount Lemmon	Mount Lemmon Survey	HNS	800 m	MPC · JPL
883929	2016 VY_{36}	—	November 10, 2016	Haleakala	Pan-STARRS 1	·	1.3 km	MPC · JPL
883930	2016 VH_{38}	—	November 4, 2016	Haleakala	Pan-STARRS 1	·	1.0 km	MPC · JPL
883931	2016 VN_{38}	—	November 3, 2016	Haleakala	Pan-STARRS 1	critical	660 m	MPC · JPL
883932	2016 VW_{38}	—	November 3, 2016	Haleakala	Pan-STARRS 1	KON	1.5 km	MPC · JPL
883933	2016 VX_{38}	—	November 4, 2016	Haleakala	Pan-STARRS 1	·	1.4 km	MPC · JPL
883934	2016 VG_{39}	—	November 9, 2016	Mount Lemmon	Mount Lemmon Survey	MAR	840 m	MPC · JPL
883935	2016 VJ_{39}	—	November 10, 2016	Mount Lemmon	Mount Lemmon Survey	DOR	1.5 km	MPC · JPL
883936	2016 VL_{40}	—	November 10, 2016	Haleakala	Pan-STARRS 1	·	690 m	MPC · JPL
883937	2016 VD_{42}	—	November 10, 2016	Haleakala	Pan-STARRS 1	·	1.1 km	MPC · JPL
883938	2016 VL_{42}	—	November 6, 2016	Mount Lemmon	Mount Lemmon Survey	·	920 m	MPC · JPL
883939	2016 VE_{43}	—	November 11, 2016	Mount Lemmon	Mount Lemmon Survey	·	740 m	MPC · JPL
883940	2016 VN_{45}	—	November 3, 2016	Haleakala	Pan-STARRS 1	·	890 m	MPC · JPL
883941	2016 VP_{45}	—	November 9, 2016	Mount Lemmon	Mount Lemmon Survey	·	870 m	MPC · JPL
883942	2016 VC_{46}	—	November 6, 2016	Kitt Peak	Spacewatch	·	1.1 km	MPC · JPL
883943	2016 VH_{46}	—	November 5, 2016	Haleakala	Pan-STARRS 1	·	880 m	MPC · JPL
883944	2016 VJ_{48}	—	November 9, 2016	Mount Lemmon	Mount Lemmon Survey	·	1.2 km	MPC · JPL
883945	2016 VU_{58}	—	November 10, 2016	Haleakala	Pan-STARRS 1	·	1.3 km	MPC · JPL
883946	2016 VY_{59}	—	November 5, 2016	Mount Lemmon	Mount Lemmon Survey	·	1.2 km	MPC · JPL
883947	2016 VX_{60}	—	October 9, 2007	Mount Lemmon	Mount Lemmon Survey	·	1.0 km	MPC · JPL
883948	2016 VD_{63}	—	November 11, 2016	Mount Lemmon	Mount Lemmon Survey	·	680 m	MPC · JPL
883949	2016 VK_{63}	—	November 10, 2016	Haleakala	Pan-STARRS 1	·	1.5 km	MPC · JPL
883950	2016 VR_{64}	—	November 10, 2016	Haleakala	Pan-STARRS 1	L5	7.7 km	MPC · JPL
883951	2016 VP_{71}	—	November 12, 2012	Mount Lemmon	Mount Lemmon Survey	·	1.0 km	MPC · JPL
883952	2016 WL_{4}	—	October 28, 2016	Haleakala	Pan-STARRS 1	·	1.5 km	MPC · JPL
883953	2016 WT_{11}	—	January 10, 2013	Haleakala	Pan-STARRS 1	·	990 m	MPC · JPL
883954	2016 WW_{11}	—	September 3, 2016	Mount Lemmon	Mount Lemmon Survey	MAR	810 m	MPC · JPL
883955	2016 WX_{11}	—	September 19, 2003	Palomar	NEAT	JUN	640 m	MPC · JPL
883956	2016 WS_{13}	—	November 18, 2016	Mount Lemmon	Mount Lemmon Survey	·	1.1 km	MPC · JPL
883957	2016 WU_{13}	—	October 12, 2016	Mount Lemmon	Mount Lemmon Survey	CLO	1.0 km	MPC · JPL
883958	2016 WQ_{16}	—	October 6, 2016	Mount Lemmon	Mount Lemmon Survey	H	450 m	MPC · JPL
883959	2016 WN_{19}	—	October 8, 2007	Mount Lemmon	Mount Lemmon Survey	·	910 m	MPC · JPL
883960	2016 WF_{22}	—	October 26, 2016	Haleakala	Pan-STARRS 1	·	1.1 km	MPC · JPL
883961	2016 WY_{23}	—	November 4, 2016	Haleakala	Pan-STARRS 1	·	960 m	MPC · JPL
883962	2016 WE_{24}	—	November 23, 2016	Mount Lemmon	Mount Lemmon Survey	·	960 m	MPC · JPL
883963	2016 WT_{27}	—	November 19, 2003	Palomar	NEAT	·	1.1 km	MPC · JPL
883964	2016 WV_{28}	—	October 13, 2007	Mount Lemmon	Mount Lemmon Survey	·	850 m	MPC · JPL
883965	2016 WY_{28}	—	October 28, 2016	Haleakala	Pan-STARRS 1	ADE	1.1 km	MPC · JPL
883966	2016 WQ_{33}	—	October 4, 2016	Mount Lemmon	Mount Lemmon Survey	·	1.2 km	MPC · JPL
883967	2016 WG_{35}	—	August 29, 2016	Mount Lemmon	Mount Lemmon Survey	critical	610 m	MPC · JPL
883968	2016 WK_{37}	—	November 24, 2003	Kitt Peak	Spacewatch	·	1.1 km	MPC · JPL
883969	2016 WP_{38}	—	November 4, 2016	Haleakala	Pan-STARRS 1	·	1.0 km	MPC · JPL
883970	2016 WV_{39}	—	December 6, 2012	Mount Lemmon	Mount Lemmon Survey	(5)	730 m	MPC · JPL
883971	2016 WM_{40}	—	November 9, 2016	Mount Lemmon	Mount Lemmon Survey	·	1.6 km	MPC · JPL
883972	2016 WK_{43}	—	October 27, 2016	Mount Lemmon	Mount Lemmon Survey	·	590 m	MPC · JPL
883973	2016 WR_{52}	—	September 2, 2016	Mount Lemmon	Mount Lemmon Survey	critical	700 m	MPC · JPL
883974	2016 WY_{54}	—	October 13, 2016	Mount Lemmon	Mount Lemmon Survey	·	1.5 km	MPC · JPL
883975	2016 WF_{55}	—	June 26, 2015	Haleakala	Pan-STARRS 1	JUN	860 m	MPC · JPL
883976	2016 WL_{58}	—	November 20, 2016	Mount Lemmon	Mount Lemmon Survey	(1547)	830 m	MPC · JPL
883977	2016 WO_{59}	—	November 25, 2016	Mount Lemmon	Mount Lemmon Survey	·	1.1 km	MPC · JPL
883978	2016 WP_{59}	—	November 23, 2016	Mount Lemmon	Mount Lemmon Survey	·	1.3 km	MPC · JPL
883979	2016 WY_{60}	—	November 25, 2016	Mount Lemmon	Mount Lemmon Survey	BAR	850 m	MPC · JPL
883980	2016 WL_{62}	—	November 20, 2016	Mount Lemmon	Mount Lemmon Survey	·	1.1 km	MPC · JPL
883981	2016 WN_{62}	—	October 8, 2007	Catalina	CSS	·	1.1 km	MPC · JPL
883982	2016 WV_{62}	—	November 25, 2016	Mount Lemmon	Mount Lemmon Survey	critical	1.2 km	MPC · JPL
883983	2016 WX_{63}	—	November 23, 2016	Mount Lemmon	Mount Lemmon Survey	·	1.6 km	MPC · JPL
883984	2016 WM_{64}	—	November 10, 2016	Haleakala	Pan-STARRS 1	·	1.4 km	MPC · JPL
883985	2016 WP_{64}	—	November 19, 2016	Mount Lemmon	Mount Lemmon Survey	·	880 m	MPC · JPL
883986	2016 WV_{64}	—	November 23, 2016	Mount Lemmon	Mount Lemmon Survey	·	1.3 km	MPC · JPL
883987	2016 WD_{65}	—	November 18, 2016	Mount Lemmon	Mount Lemmon Survey	·	1.2 km	MPC · JPL
883988	2016 WP_{65}	—	November 23, 2016	Mount Lemmon	Mount Lemmon Survey	AGN	870 m	MPC · JPL
883989	2016 WF_{66}	—	November 24, 2016	Mount Lemmon	Mount Lemmon Survey	·	1.1 km	MPC · JPL
883990	2016 WS_{67}	—	November 26, 2016	Mount Lemmon	Mount Lemmon Survey	·	1.2 km	MPC · JPL
883991	2016 WC_{68}	—	November 25, 2016	Mount Lemmon	Mount Lemmon Survey	critical	1.0 km	MPC · JPL
883992	2016 WH_{71}	—	November 23, 2016	Mount Lemmon	Mount Lemmon Survey	·	1.7 km	MPC · JPL
883993	2016 WX_{71}	—	November 28, 2016	Haleakala	Pan-STARRS 1	·	1.4 km	MPC · JPL
883994	2016 WH_{76}	—	November 23, 2016	Mount Lemmon	Mount Lemmon Survey	·	2.4 km	MPC · JPL
883995	2016 WF_{77}	—	November 20, 2016	Mount Lemmon	Mount Lemmon Survey	·	1.9 km	MPC · JPL
883996	2016 WD_{79}	—	November 28, 2016	Haleakala	Pan-STARRS 1	·	1.2 km	MPC · JPL
883997	2016 WG_{79}	—	November 25, 2016	Mount Lemmon	Mount Lemmon Survey	DOR	1.5 km	MPC · JPL
883998	2016 WX_{79}	—	November 28, 2016	Haleakala	Pan-STARRS 1	·	2.0 km	MPC · JPL
883999	2016 WY_{81}	—	November 25, 2016	Mount Lemmon	Mount Lemmon Survey	·	1.2 km	MPC · JPL
884000	2016 WA_{82}	—	November 23, 2016	Mount Lemmon	Mount Lemmon Survey	·	1.2 km	MPC · JPL

back to top
