= List of minor planets: 26001–27000 =

The following is a partial list of minor planets, running from minor-planet number 26001 through 27000, inclusive. The primary data for this and other partial lists is based on JPL's "Small-Body Orbital Elements" and data available from the Minor Planet Center. Critical list information is also provided by the MPC, unless otherwise specified from Lowell Observatory. A detailed description of the table's columns and additional sources are given on the main page including a complete list of every page in this series, and a statistical break-up on the dynamical classification of minor planets.

Also see the summary list of all named bodies in numerical and alphabetical order, and the corresponding naming citations for the number range of this particular list. New namings may only be added to this list after official publication, as the preannouncement of names is condemned by the Working Group for Small Bodies Nomenclature of the International Astronomical Union.

Near-Earth obj.	MBA (inner)	MBA (outer)	Centaur
Mars-crosser	MBA (middle)	Jupiter trojan	Trans-Neptunian obj.
Unclassified

== 26001–26100 ==
Designation			Discovery			Properties		Ref
Permanent	Provisional	Named after	Date	Site	Discoverer(s)	Category	Diam.	Ref
26001	2001 FX_{98}	—	March 16, 2001	Socorro	LINEAR	slow	8.2 km	MPC · JPL
26002 Angelayeung	2001 FL_{103}	Angelayeung	March 18, 2001	Socorro	LINEAR	·	3.2 km	MPC · JPL
26003 Amundson	2001 FD_{104}	Amundson	March 18, 2001	Anderson Mesa	LONEOS	KOR	3.6 km	MPC · JPL
26004 Loriying	2001 FL_{108}	Loriying	March 18, 2001	Socorro	LINEAR	NYS	3.1 km	MPC · JPL
26005 Alicezhao	2001 FO_{109}	Alicezhao	March 18, 2001	Socorro	LINEAR	(6769)	3.2 km	MPC · JPL
26006	2001 FC_{112}	—	March 18, 2001	Kitt Peak	Spacewatch	·	1.5 km	MPC · JPL
26007 Lindazhou	2001 FQ_{120}	Lindazhou	March 26, 2001	Socorro	LINEAR	·	2.8 km	MPC · JPL
26008	2001 FE_{127}	—	March 29, 2001	Socorro	LINEAR	·	2.4 km	MPC · JPL
26009	2001 FJ_{129}	—	March 26, 2001	Socorro	LINEAR	·	3.1 km	MPC · JPL
26010	2001 FN_{129}	—	March 26, 2001	Socorro	LINEAR	NYS	3.0 km	MPC · JPL
26011 Cornelius	2001 FA_{136}	Cornelius	March 21, 2001	Anderson Mesa	LONEOS	·	4.4 km	MPC · JPL
26012 Sanborn	2001 FG_{148}	Sanborn	March 24, 2001	Anderson Mesa	LONEOS	MAR	4.5 km	MPC · JPL
26013 Amandalonzo	2001 FZ_{148}	Amandalonzo	March 24, 2001	Socorro	LINEAR	·	2.1 km	MPC · JPL
26014	2051 P-L	—	September 24, 1960	Palomar	C. J. van Houten, I. van Houten-Groeneveld, T. Gehrels	·	2.6 km	MPC · JPL
26015	2076 P-L	—	September 26, 1960	Palomar	C. J. van Houten, I. van Houten-Groeneveld, T. Gehrels	·	3.0 km	MPC · JPL
26016	2633 P-L	—	September 24, 1960	Palomar	C. J. van Houten, I. van Houten-Groeneveld, T. Gehrels	·	2.4 km	MPC · JPL
26017	2674 P-L	—	September 24, 1960	Palomar	C. J. van Houten, I. van Houten-Groeneveld, T. Gehrels	·	5.6 km	MPC · JPL
26018	2695 P-L	—	September 24, 1960	Palomar	C. J. van Houten, I. van Houten-Groeneveld, T. Gehrels	·	6.7 km	MPC · JPL
26019	2768 P-L	—	September 24, 1960	Palomar	C. J. van Houten, I. van Houten-Groeneveld, T. Gehrels	·	5.6 km	MPC · JPL
26020	3094 P-L	—	September 24, 1960	Palomar	C. J. van Houten, I. van Houten-Groeneveld, T. Gehrels	EUN	3.5 km	MPC · JPL
26021	4177 P-L	—	September 24, 1960	Palomar	C. J. van Houten, I. van Houten-Groeneveld, T. Gehrels	·	3.3 km	MPC · JPL
26022	4180 P-L	—	September 24, 1960	Palomar	C. J. van Houten, I. van Houten-Groeneveld, T. Gehrels	·	2.4 km	MPC · JPL
26023	4538 P-L	—	September 24, 1960	Palomar	C. J. van Houten, I. van Houten-Groeneveld, T. Gehrels	·	3.9 km	MPC · JPL
26024	4543 P-L	—	September 24, 1960	Palomar	C. J. van Houten, I. van Houten-Groeneveld, T. Gehrels	·	2.3 km	MPC · JPL
26025	4587 P-L	—	September 24, 1960	Palomar	C. J. van Houten, I. van Houten-Groeneveld, T. Gehrels	NYS	5.8 km	MPC · JPL
26026	4664 P-L	—	September 24, 1960	Palomar	C. J. van Houten, I. van Houten-Groeneveld, T. Gehrels	GEF ·	8.2 km	MPC · JPL
26027 Cotopaxi	4861 P-L	Cotopaxi	September 24, 1960	Palomar	C. J. van Houten, I. van Houten-Groeneveld, T. Gehrels	H	1.4 km	MPC · JPL
26028	5554 P-L	—	October 17, 1960	Palomar	C. J. van Houten, I. van Houten-Groeneveld, T. Gehrels	·	4.3 km	MPC · JPL
26029	5565 P-L	—	October 17, 1960	Palomar	C. J. van Houten, I. van Houten-Groeneveld, T. Gehrels	·	3.5 km	MPC · JPL
26030	6004 P-L	—	September 24, 1960	Palomar	C. J. van Houten, I. van Houten-Groeneveld, T. Gehrels	·	2.3 km	MPC · JPL
26031	6074 P-L	—	September 24, 1960	Palomar	C. J. van Houten, I. van Houten-Groeneveld, T. Gehrels	·	1.7 km	MPC · JPL
26032	6556 P-L	—	September 24, 1960	Palomar	C. J. van Houten, I. van Houten-Groeneveld, T. Gehrels	·	5.3 km	MPC · JPL
26033	6801 P-L	—	September 24, 1960	Palomar	C. J. van Houten, I. van Houten-Groeneveld, T. Gehrels	NYS	2.8 km	MPC · JPL
26034	9611 P-L	—	October 17, 1960	Palomar	C. J. van Houten, I. van Houten-Groeneveld, T. Gehrels	·	3.0 km	MPC · JPL
26035	1119 T-1	—	March 25, 1971	Palomar	C. J. van Houten, I. van Houten-Groeneveld, T. Gehrels	·	2.1 km	MPC · JPL
26036	2166 T-1	—	March 25, 1971	Palomar	C. J. van Houten, I. van Houten-Groeneveld, T. Gehrels	·	3.2 km	MPC · JPL
26037	2183 T-1	—	March 25, 1971	Palomar	C. J. van Houten, I. van Houten-Groeneveld, T. Gehrels	MAS	2.1 km	MPC · JPL
26038	2290 T-1	—	March 25, 1971	Palomar	C. J. van Houten, I. van Houten-Groeneveld, T. Gehrels	·	3.8 km	MPC · JPL
26039	3268 T-1	—	March 26, 1971	Palomar	C. J. van Houten, I. van Houten-Groeneveld, T. Gehrels	V	1.8 km	MPC · JPL
26040	3747 T-1	—	May 13, 1971	Palomar	C. J. van Houten, I. van Houten-Groeneveld, T. Gehrels	·	3.3 km	MPC · JPL
26041	4172 T-1	—	March 26, 1971	Palomar	C. J. van Houten, I. van Houten-Groeneveld, T. Gehrels	·	3.5 km	MPC · JPL
26042	4242 T-1	—	March 26, 1971	Palomar	C. J. van Houten, I. van Houten-Groeneveld, T. Gehrels	·	10 km	MPC · JPL
26043	4319 T-1	—	March 26, 1971	Palomar	C. J. van Houten, I. van Houten-Groeneveld, T. Gehrels	·	5.5 km	MPC · JPL
26044	1259 T-2	—	September 29, 1973	Palomar	C. J. van Houten, I. van Houten-Groeneveld, T. Gehrels	KOR	5.9 km	MPC · JPL
26045	1582 T-2	—	September 24, 1973	Palomar	C. J. van Houten, I. van Houten-Groeneveld, T. Gehrels	·	2.1 km	MPC · JPL
26046	2104 T-2	—	September 29, 1973	Palomar	C. J. van Houten, I. van Houten-Groeneveld, T. Gehrels	KOR	3.9 km	MPC · JPL
26047	2148 T-2	—	September 29, 1973	Palomar	C. J. van Houten, I. van Houten-Groeneveld, T. Gehrels	ADE	6.5 km	MPC · JPL
26048	2409 T-2	—	September 25, 1973	Palomar	C. J. van Houten, I. van Houten-Groeneveld, T. Gehrels	·	2.7 km	MPC · JPL
26049	3161 T-2	—	September 30, 1973	Palomar	C. J. van Houten, I. van Houten-Groeneveld, T. Gehrels	(5)	2.0 km	MPC · JPL
26050	3167 T-2	—	September 30, 1973	Palomar	C. J. van Houten, I. van Houten-Groeneveld, T. Gehrels	·	2.2 km	MPC · JPL
26051	3200 T-2	—	September 30, 1973	Palomar	C. J. van Houten, I. van Houten-Groeneveld, T. Gehrels	·	5.0 km	MPC · JPL
26052	3230 T-2	—	September 30, 1973	Palomar	C. J. van Houten, I. van Houten-Groeneveld, T. Gehrels	CYB	7.7 km	MPC · JPL
26053	4081 T-2	—	September 29, 1973	Palomar	C. J. van Houten, I. van Houten-Groeneveld, T. Gehrels	·	2.3 km	MPC · JPL
26054	4231 T-2	—	September 29, 1973	Palomar	C. J. van Houten, I. van Houten-Groeneveld, T. Gehrels	V	3.1 km	MPC · JPL
26055	4257 T-2	—	September 29, 1973	Palomar	C. J. van Houten, I. van Houten-Groeneveld, T. Gehrels	KOR	3.9 km	MPC · JPL
26056	4281 T-2	—	September 29, 1973	Palomar	C. J. van Houten, I. van Houten-Groeneveld, T. Gehrels	·	4.1 km	MPC · JPL
26057 Ankaios	4742 T-2	Ankaios	September 30, 1973	Palomar	C. J. van Houten, I. van Houten-Groeneveld, T. Gehrels	L4	20 km	MPC · JPL
26058	1061 T-3	—	October 17, 1977	Palomar	C. J. van Houten, I. van Houten-Groeneveld, T. Gehrels	EOS	5.9 km	MPC · JPL
26059	1089 T-3	—	October 17, 1977	Palomar	C. J. van Houten, I. van Houten-Groeneveld, T. Gehrels	·	2.9 km	MPC · JPL
26060	1164 T-3	—	October 17, 1977	Palomar	C. J. van Houten, I. van Houten-Groeneveld, T. Gehrels	·	6.5 km	MPC · JPL
26061	2315 T-3	—	October 16, 1977	Palomar	C. J. van Houten, I. van Houten-Groeneveld, T. Gehrels	·	4.9 km	MPC · JPL
26062	2466 T-3	—	October 16, 1977	Palomar	C. J. van Houten, I. van Houten-Groeneveld, T. Gehrels	EOS	6.7 km	MPC · JPL
26063	2634 T-3	—	October 16, 1977	Palomar	C. J. van Houten, I. van Houten-Groeneveld, T. Gehrels	·	2.9 km	MPC · JPL
26064	3500 T-3	—	October 16, 1977	Palomar	C. J. van Houten, I. van Houten-Groeneveld, T. Gehrels	V	1.5 km	MPC · JPL
26065	3761 T-3	—	October 16, 1977	Palomar	C. J. van Houten, I. van Houten-Groeneveld, T. Gehrels	·	1.9 km	MPC · JPL
26066	4031 T-3	—	October 16, 1977	Palomar	C. J. van Houten, I. van Houten-Groeneveld, T. Gehrels	·	3.0 km	MPC · JPL
26067	4079 T-3	—	October 16, 1977	Palomar	C. J. van Houten, I. van Houten-Groeneveld, T. Gehrels	EOS	5.8 km	MPC · JPL
26068	4093 T-3	—	October 16, 1977	Palomar	C. J. van Houten, I. van Houten-Groeneveld, T. Gehrels	·	3.0 km	MPC · JPL
26069	4215 T-3	—	October 16, 1977	Palomar	C. J. van Houten, I. van Houten-Groeneveld, T. Gehrels	·	2.8 km	MPC · JPL
26070	4240 T-3	—	October 16, 1977	Palomar	C. J. van Houten, I. van Houten-Groeneveld, T. Gehrels	·	2.0 km	MPC · JPL
26071	4335 T-3	—	October 16, 1977	Palomar	C. J. van Houten, I. van Houten-Groeneveld, T. Gehrels	·	5.3 km	MPC · JPL
26072	5155 T-3	—	October 16, 1977	Palomar	C. J. van Houten, I. van Houten-Groeneveld, T. Gehrels	EOS	5.4 km	MPC · JPL
26073	5168 T-3	—	October 16, 1977	Palomar	C. J. van Houten, I. van Houten-Groeneveld, T. Gehrels	EOS	7.2 km	MPC · JPL
26074 Carlwirtz	1977 TD	Carlwirtz	October 8, 1977	La Silla	H.-E. Schuster	H · moon	2.2 km	MPC · JPL
26075 Levitsvet	1978 PA_{3}	Levitsvet	August 8, 1978	Nauchnij	N. S. Chernykh	·	2.4 km	MPC · JPL
26076	1979 MM_{1}	—	June 25, 1979	Siding Spring	E. F. Helin, S. J. Bus	URS	13 km	MPC · JPL
26077	1979 ML_{6}	—	June 25, 1979	Siding Spring	E. F. Helin, S. J. Bus	·	3.5 km	MPC · JPL
26078	1979 MP_{6}	—	June 25, 1979	Siding Spring	E. F. Helin, S. J. Bus	WIT	3.3 km	MPC · JPL
26079	1979 MW_{6}	—	June 25, 1979	Siding Spring	E. F. Helin, S. J. Bus	·	3.9 km	MPC · JPL
26080 Pablomarques	1980 EF	Pablomarques	March 14, 1980	Anderson Mesa	E. Bowell	·	7.2 km	MPC · JPL
26081	1980 PT_{1}	—	August 6, 1980	La Silla	R. M. West	EOS	8.0 km	MPC · JPL
26082	1981 EB_{11}	—	March 1, 1981	Siding Spring	S. J. Bus	·	2.6 km	MPC · JPL
26083	1981 EJ_{11}	—	March 1, 1981	Siding Spring	S. J. Bus	slow	4.9 km	MPC · JPL
26084	1981 EK_{17}	—	March 1, 1981	Siding Spring	S. J. Bus	V · slow	2.4 km	MPC · JPL
26085	1981 ED_{18}	—	March 2, 1981	Siding Spring	S. J. Bus	·	6.1 km	MPC · JPL
26086	1981 UE_{23}	—	October 24, 1981	Palomar	S. J. Bus	·	19 km	MPC · JPL
26087 Zhuravleva	1982 UU_{8}	Zhuravleva	October 21, 1982	Nauchnij	L. G. Karachkina	·	4.1 km	MPC · JPL
26088	1985 QF_{1}	—	August 17, 1985	Palomar	E. F. Helin	EUN	5.1 km	MPC · JPL
26089	1985 QN_{2}	—	August 17, 1985	Palomar	E. F. Helin	·	3.6 km	MPC · JPL
26090 Monrovia	1986 PU_{1}	Monrovia	August 1, 1986	Palomar	Rudnyk, M.	MAS	2.4 km	MPC · JPL
26091	1987 RL_{1}	—	September 13, 1987	La Silla	H. Debehogne	·	2.5 km	MPC · JPL
26092 Norikonoriyuki	1987 SF	Norikonoriyuki	September 16, 1987	Geisei	T. Seki	·	3.1 km	MPC · JPL
26093	1987 UA_{1}	—	October 25, 1987	Kushiro	S. Ueda, H. Kaneda	·	5.3 km	MPC · JPL
26094	1988 NU	—	July 11, 1988	Palomar	E. F. Helin	·	5.1 km	MPC · JPL
26095	1988 PU	—	August 10, 1988	Palomar	Mikolajczak, C., Coker, R.	·	6.6 km	MPC · JPL
26096	1988 SD_{3}	—	September 16, 1988	Cerro Tololo	S. J. Bus	EUN	4.1 km	MPC · JPL
26097 Kamishi	1988 VJ_{1}	Kamishi	November 6, 1988	Geisei	T. Seki	·	3.4 km	MPC · JPL
26098	1989 AN_{3}	—	January 4, 1989	Siding Spring	R. H. McNaught	·	3.5 km	MPC · JPL
26099	1989 WH	—	November 20, 1989	Gekko	Y. Oshima	GEF	4.1 km	MPC · JPL
26100	1990 QL_{5}	—	August 29, 1990	Palomar	H. E. Holt	NYS	2.4 km	MPC · JPL

== 26101–26200 ==
back to top

Designation			Discovery			Properties		Ref
Permanent	Provisional	Named after	Date	Site	Discoverer(s)	Category	Diam.	Ref
26101	1990 QQ_{6}	—	August 20, 1990	La Silla	E. W. Elst	·	3.9 km	MPC · JPL
26102	1990 QA_{9}	—	August 16, 1990	La Silla	E. W. Elst	·	10 km	MPC · JPL
26103	1990 SC_{3}	—	September 18, 1990	Palomar	H. E. Holt	·	6.3 km	MPC · JPL
26104 Masayukimori	1990 VV_{1}	Masayukimori	November 11, 1990	Kitami	K. Endate, K. Watanabe	·	7.3 km	MPC · JPL
26105	1990 VH_{5}	—	November 15, 1990	La Silla	E. W. Elst	·	4.5 km	MPC · JPL
26106	1990 WJ_{2}	—	November 18, 1990	La Silla	E. W. Elst	HNS	5.0 km	MPC · JPL
26107	1991 GZ_{5}	—	April 8, 1991	La Silla	E. W. Elst	·	4.8 km	MPC · JPL
26108	1991 LF_{2}	—	June 6, 1991	La Silla	E. W. Elst	KOR	5.5 km	MPC · JPL
26109	1991 LJ_{3}	—	June 6, 1991	La Silla	E. W. Elst	·	2.0 km	MPC · JPL
26110	1991 NK_{4}	—	July 8, 1991	La Silla	H. Debehogne	·	3.8 km	MPC · JPL
26111	1991 OV	—	July 18, 1991	Palomar	H. E. Holt	·	2.9 km	MPC · JPL
26112	1991 PG_{18}	—	August 8, 1991	Palomar	H. E. Holt	2:1J	9.1 km	MPC · JPL
26113	1991 PL_{18}	—	August 8, 1991	Palomar	H. E. Holt	·	2.1 km	MPC · JPL
26114	1991 QG	—	August 31, 1991	Kiyosato	S. Otomo	·	7.7 km	MPC · JPL
26115	1991 RG_{17}	—	September 15, 1991	Palomar	H. E. Holt	·	3.8 km	MPC · JPL
26116	1991 RW_{17}	—	September 13, 1991	Palomar	H. E. Holt	·	3.1 km	MPC · JPL
26117	1991 RX_{21}	—	September 11, 1991	Palomar	H. E. Holt	·	11 km	MPC · JPL
26118	1991 TH	—	October 1, 1991	Siding Spring	R. H. McNaught	·	3.2 km	MPC · JPL
26119 Duden	1991 TN_{7}	Duden	October 7, 1991	Tautenburg Observatory	F. Börngen	NYS	3.4 km	MPC · JPL
26120	1991 VZ_{2}	—	November 5, 1991	Dynic	A. Sugie	·	3.0 km	MPC · JPL
26121	1992 BX	—	January 28, 1992	Kushiro	S. Ueda, H. Kaneda	·	8.5 km	MPC · JPL
26122 Antonysutton	1992 CS_{2}	Antonysutton	February 2, 1992	La Silla	E. W. Elst	·	4.1 km	MPC · JPL
26123 Hiroshiyoshida	1992 OK	Hiroshiyoshida	July 29, 1992	Geisei	T. Seki	·	5.8 km	MPC · JPL
26124	1992 PG_{2}	—	August 2, 1992	Palomar	H. E. Holt	CLO	6.3 km	MPC · JPL
26125	1992 RG	—	September 3, 1992	Kiyosato	S. Otomo	·	12 km	MPC · JPL
26126	1992 RD_{2}	—	September 2, 1992	La Silla	E. W. Elst	·	5.5 km	MPC · JPL
26127 Otakasakajyo	1993 BL_{2}	Otakasakajyo	January 19, 1993	Geisei	T. Seki	·	3.1 km	MPC · JPL
26128	1993 BO_{10}	—	January 22, 1993	Kitt Peak	Spacewatch	·	11 km	MPC · JPL
26129	1993 DK	—	February 19, 1993	Oohira	T. Urata	·	6.6 km	MPC · JPL
26130	1993 FQ_{11}	—	March 17, 1993	La Silla	UESAC	NYS	3.6 km	MPC · JPL
26131	1993 FE_{20}	—	March 17, 1993	La Silla	UESAC	·	3.6 km	MPC · JPL
26132	1993 FF_{24}	—	March 21, 1993	La Silla	UESAC	NYS	3.4 km	MPC · JPL
26133	1993 FS_{26}	—	March 21, 1993	La Silla	UESAC	·	4.5 km	MPC · JPL
26134	1993 FY_{34}	—	March 19, 1993	La Silla	UESAC	V	1.9 km	MPC · JPL
26135	1993 GL_{1}	—	April 12, 1993	La Silla	H. Debehogne	·	10 km	MPC · JPL
26136	1993 OK_{7}	—	July 20, 1993	La Silla	E. W. Elst	·	4.0 km	MPC · JPL
26137	1993 QV_{1}	—	August 16, 1993	Caussols	E. W. Elst	·	5.7 km	MPC · JPL
26138	1993 TK_{25}	—	October 9, 1993	La Silla	E. W. Elst	·	4.0 km	MPC · JPL
26139	1993 TK_{32}	—	October 9, 1993	La Silla	E. W. Elst	·	4.8 km	MPC · JPL
26140	1994 CX_{10}	—	February 7, 1994	La Silla	E. W. Elst	THM	7.8 km	MPC · JPL
26141	1994 GR_{2}	—	April 5, 1994	Kitt Peak	Spacewatch	·	1.5 km	MPC · JPL
26142	1994 PL_{1}	—	August 3, 1994	Siding Spring	R. H. McNaught	PHO	2.6 km	MPC · JPL
26143	1994 PF_{5}	—	August 10, 1994	La Silla	E. W. Elst	V	1.7 km	MPC · JPL
26144	1994 PG_{7}	—	August 10, 1994	La Silla	E. W. Elst	·	3.7 km	MPC · JPL
26145	1994 PG_{18}	—	August 12, 1994	La Silla	E. W. Elst	V	3.5 km	MPC · JPL
26146	1994 PF_{27}	—	August 12, 1994	La Silla	E. W. Elst	·	3.1 km	MPC · JPL
26147	1994 PS_{32}	—	August 12, 1994	La Silla	E. W. Elst	·	2.4 km	MPC · JPL
26148	1994 PN_{37}	—	August 10, 1994	La Silla	E. W. Elst	·	4.2 km	MPC · JPL
26149	1994 PU_{37}	—	August 10, 1994	La Silla	E. W. Elst	·	2.7 km	MPC · JPL
26150	1994 RW_{11}	—	September 4, 1994	Palomar	E. F. Helin	·	5.7 km	MPC · JPL
26151 Irinokaigan	1994 TT_{3}	Irinokaigan	October 2, 1994	Geisei	T. Seki	·	6.5 km	MPC · JPL
26152	1994 UF	—	October 24, 1994	Siding Spring	R. H. McNaught	·	5.4 km	MPC · JPL
26153	1994 UY	—	October 31, 1994	Nachi-Katsuura	Y. Shimizu, T. Urata	·	2.9 km	MPC · JPL
26154	1994 VF_{1}	—	November 4, 1994	Oizumi	T. Kobayashi	MAR	3.7 km	MPC · JPL
26155	1994 VL_{7}	—	November 8, 1994	Kiyosato	S. Otomo	NYS	3.7 km	MPC · JPL
26156	1994 WT	—	November 25, 1994	Oizumi	T. Kobayashi	·	3.7 km	MPC · JPL
26157	1994 WA_{1}	—	November 25, 1994	Oizumi	T. Kobayashi	NYS	4.6 km	MPC · JPL
26158	1994 WH_{1}	—	November 27, 1994	Oizumi	T. Kobayashi	EUN	6.8 km	MPC · JPL
26159	1994 WN_{3}	—	November 28, 1994	Kushiro	S. Ueda, H. Kaneda	·	3.8 km	MPC · JPL
26160	1994 XR_{4}	—	December 9, 1994	Oizumi	T. Kobayashi	·	11 km	MPC · JPL
26161	1995 BY_{2}	—	January 27, 1995	Kiyosato	S. Otomo	EUN	5.2 km	MPC · JPL
26162	1995 BB_{14}	—	January 31, 1995	Kitt Peak	Spacewatch	·	6.0 km	MPC · JPL
26163	1995 DW	—	February 20, 1995	Oizumi	T. Kobayashi	KOR	5.3 km	MPC · JPL
26164	1995 FK_{4}	—	March 23, 1995	Kitt Peak	Spacewatch	·	14 km	MPC · JPL
26165	1995 FJ_{6}	—	March 23, 1995	Kitt Peak	Spacewatch	·	4.5 km	MPC · JPL
26166	1995 QN_{3}	—	August 31, 1995	Kitt Peak	Spacewatch	T_{j} (2.75) · AMO · CYB · +1km · 2:1J (unstable)	1.6 km	MPC · JPL
26167	1995 SA_{1}	—	September 18, 1995	Catalina Station	T. B. Spahr	PHO	3.6 km	MPC · JPL
26168 Kanaikiyotaka	1995 WT_{8}	Kanaikiyotaka	November 24, 1995	Ojima	T. Niijima	·	2.3 km	MPC · JPL
26169 Ishikawakiyoshi	1995 YY	Ishikawakiyoshi	December 21, 1995	Oizumi	T. Kobayashi	·	2.7 km	MPC · JPL
26170 Kazuhiko	1996 BH_{2}	Kazuhiko	January 24, 1996	Ojima	T. Niijima	·	4.9 km	MPC · JPL
26171 Katsunorikataoka	1996 BY_{2}	Katsunorikataoka	January 17, 1996	Kitami	K. Endate, K. Watanabe	·	9.6 km	MPC · JPL
26172	1996 BV_{5}	—	January 18, 1996	Kitt Peak	Spacewatch	MAR	2.4 km	MPC · JPL
26173	1996 DQ_{2}	—	February 23, 1996	Oizumi	T. Kobayashi	·	4.9 km	MPC · JPL
26174	1996 EP_{1}	—	March 15, 1996	Haleakala	NEAT	(5)	4.6 km	MPC · JPL
26175	1996 EZ_{15}	—	March 13, 1996	Kitt Peak	Spacewatch	·	5.1 km	MPC · JPL
26176	1996 GD_{2}	—	April 15, 1996	Haleakala	AMOS	·	7.4 km	MPC · JPL
26177 Fabiodolfi	1996 GN_{2}	Fabiodolfi	April 12, 1996	San Marcello	L. Tesi, A. Boattini	·	5.2 km	MPC · JPL
26178	1996 GV_{2}	—	April 11, 1996	Xinglong	SCAP	EUN	4.9 km	MPC · JPL
26179	1996 GL_{3}	—	April 9, 1996	Kitt Peak	Spacewatch	·	3.4 km	MPC · JPL
26180	1996 GS_{9}	—	April 13, 1996	Kitt Peak	Spacewatch	·	6.4 km	MPC · JPL
26181	1996 GQ_{21}	—	April 12, 1996	Steward Observatory	Danzl, N.	SDO	400 km	MPC · JPL
26182	1996 HW_{8}	—	April 17, 1996	La Silla	E. W. Elst	·	3.3 km	MPC · JPL
26183 Henrigodard	1996 HG_{15}	Henrigodard	April 17, 1996	La Silla	E. W. Elst	KOR	4.4 km	MPC · JPL
26184	1996 HC_{25}	—	April 20, 1996	La Silla	E. W. Elst	KOR	4.3 km	MPC · JPL
26185	1996 NG	—	July 14, 1996	Haleakala	NEAT	HYG	8.2 km	MPC · JPL
26186	1996 SJ_{3}	—	September 20, 1996	Kitt Peak	Spacewatch	·	9.1 km	MPC · JPL
26187	1996 XA_{27}	—	December 12, 1996	Xinglong	SCAP	TIR	9.6 km	MPC · JPL
26188 Zengqingcun	1996 YE_{2}	Zengqingcun	December 22, 1996	Xinglong	SCAP	slow	4.5 km	MPC · JPL
26189	1997 AX_{12}	—	January 10, 1997	Oizumi	T. Kobayashi	·	1.7 km	MPC · JPL
26190	1997 BG_{3}	—	January 30, 1997	Oizumi	T. Kobayashi	·	2.2 km	MPC · JPL
26191	1997 CZ_{2}	—	February 3, 1997	Oizumi	T. Kobayashi	NYS	2.8 km	MPC · JPL
26192	1997 CH_{16}	—	February 6, 1997	Kitt Peak	Spacewatch	·	1.7 km	MPC · JPL
26193	1997 CL_{20}	—	February 12, 1997	Oizumi	T. Kobayashi	·	3.0 km	MPC · JPL
26194 Chasolivier	1997 CO_{26}	Chasolivier	February 10, 1997	Kitt Peak	Spacewatch	·	1.8 km	MPC · JPL
26195 Černohlávek	1997 EN	Černohlávek	March 1, 1997	Ondřejov	P. Pravec	·	2.1 km	MPC · JPL
26196	1997 EF_{46}	—	March 9, 1997	Xinglong	SCAP	·	3.4 km	MPC · JPL
26197 Bormio	1997 FN_{1}	Bormio	March 31, 1997	Sormano	F. Manca, P. Sicoli	·	2.1 km	MPC · JPL
26198	1997 GJ_{13}	—	April 3, 1997	Socorro	LINEAR	slow	2.6 km	MPC · JPL
26199 Aileenperry	1997 GP_{13}	Aileenperry	April 3, 1997	Socorro	LINEAR	·	3.5 km	MPC · JPL
26200 Van Doren	1997 GF_{17}	Van Doren	April 3, 1997	Socorro	LINEAR	·	3.4 km	MPC · JPL

== 26201–26300 ==
back to top

Designation			Discovery			Properties		Ref
Permanent	Provisional	Named after	Date	Site	Discoverer(s)	Category	Diam.	Ref
26201 Sayonisaha	1997 GD_{24}	Sayonisaha	April 6, 1997	Socorro	LINEAR	·	2.9 km	MPC · JPL
26202	1997 GD_{42}	—	April 9, 1997	La Silla	E. W. Elst	·	5.2 km	MPC · JPL
26203	1997 KS	—	May 31, 1997	Xinglong	SCAP	V	3.0 km	MPC · JPL
26204	1997 LO_{3}	—	June 5, 1997	Kitt Peak	Spacewatch	·	3.7 km	MPC · JPL
26205 Kuratowski	1997 LA_{5}	Kuratowski	June 11, 1997	Prescott	P. G. Comba	MAR	2.4 km	MPC · JPL
26206	1997 PJ_{4}	—	August 11, 1997	Bédoin	P. Antonini	EUN	8.7 km	MPC · JPL
26207	1997 QU	—	August 25, 1997	Lake Clear	Williams, K. A.	(5)	3.8 km	MPC · JPL
26208	1997 QJ_{3}	—	August 28, 1997	Dynic	A. Sugie	·	2.4 km	MPC · JPL
26209	1997 RD_{1}	—	September 2, 1997	Haleakala	NEAT	·	3.2 km	MPC · JPL
26210 Lingas	1997 RC_{3}	Lingas	September 6, 1997	Pises	Pises	·	4.1 km	MPC · JPL
26211	1997 RR_{9}	—	September 13, 1997	Xinglong	SCAP	·	8.3 km	MPC · JPL
26212	1997 TG_{26}	—	October 11, 1997	Xinglong	SCAP	(5)	4.4 km	MPC · JPL
26213 Ayani	1997 UV_{8}	Ayani	October 25, 1997	Kitami	K. Endate, K. Watanabe	·	6.1 km	MPC · JPL
26214 Kalinga	1997 US_{10}	Kalinga	October 30, 1997	Ondřejov	P. Pravec	·	5.9 km	MPC · JPL
26215	1997 VM_{2}	—	November 4, 1997	Dynic	A. Sugie	·	6.7 km	MPC · JPL
26216	1997 VE_{3}	—	November 6, 1997	Oizumi	T. Kobayashi	EOS	6.5 km	MPC · JPL
26217	1997 WK_{2}	—	November 23, 1997	Oizumi	T. Kobayashi	(1298)	11 km	MPC · JPL
26218	1997 WJ_{13}	—	November 24, 1997	Nachi-Katsuura	Y. Shimizu, T. Urata	·	6.3 km	MPC · JPL
26219	1997 WO_{21}	—	November 30, 1997	Oizumi	T. Kobayashi	TIR	7.6 km	MPC · JPL
26220	1997 WB_{37}	—	November 29, 1997	Socorro	LINEAR	·	13 km	MPC · JPL
26221	1997 WG_{41}	—	November 29, 1997	Socorro	LINEAR	EOS	7.0 km	MPC · JPL
26222	1997 WC_{45}	—	November 29, 1997	Socorro	LINEAR	EOS	7.1 km	MPC · JPL
26223 Enari	1997 XB_{2}	Enari	December 3, 1997	Chichibu	N. Satō	·	5.2 km	MPC · JPL
26224	1997 XF_{2}	—	December 3, 1997	Chichibu	N. Satō	EOS	6.7 km	MPC · JPL
26225	1997 YO_{14}	—	December 24, 1997	Xinglong	SCAP	(5)	4.4 km	MPC · JPL
26226	1998 GJ_{1}	—	April 4, 1998	Woomera	F. B. Zoltowski	·	4.5 km	MPC · JPL
26227 Tan	1998 HJ_{7}	Tan	April 23, 1998	Socorro	LINEAR	H	2.2 km	MPC · JPL
26228	1998 OZ_{6}	—	July 20, 1998	Xinglong	SCAP	·	4.9 km	MPC · JPL
26229	1998 OG_{7}	—	July 28, 1998	Xinglong	SCAP	·	14 km	MPC · JPL
26230	1998 QR_{1}	—	August 19, 1998	Ondřejov	P. Pravec	V	2.6 km	MPC · JPL
26231	1998 QQ_{7}	—	August 17, 1998	Socorro	LINEAR	·	2.8 km	MPC · JPL
26232 Antink	1998 QW_{8}	Antink	August 17, 1998	Socorro	LINEAR	NYS	6.3 km	MPC · JPL
26233 Jimbraun	1998 QS_{11}	Jimbraun	August 17, 1998	Socorro	LINEAR	·	4.5 km	MPC · JPL
26234 Leslibrinson	1998 QV_{12}	Leslibrinson	August 17, 1998	Socorro	LINEAR	·	4.5 km	MPC · JPL
26235 Annemaduggan	1998 QU_{18}	Annemaduggan	August 17, 1998	Socorro	LINEAR	·	3.0 km	MPC · JPL
26236	1998 QC_{25}	—	August 17, 1998	Socorro	LINEAR	·	2.5 km	MPC · JPL
26237	1998 QQ_{31}	—	August 17, 1998	Socorro	LINEAR	V	2.8 km	MPC · JPL
26238 Elduval	1998 QE_{32}	Elduval	August 17, 1998	Socorro	LINEAR	V	3.1 km	MPC · JPL
26239	1998 QP_{33}	—	August 17, 1998	Socorro	LINEAR	fast	4.3 km	MPC · JPL
26240 Leigheriks	1998 QX_{39}	Leigheriks	August 17, 1998	Socorro	LINEAR	·	2.5 km	MPC · JPL
26241	1998 QY_{40}	—	August 17, 1998	Socorro	LINEAR	·	2.7 km	MPC · JPL
26242	1998 QA_{41}	—	August 17, 1998	Socorro	LINEAR	·	4.2 km	MPC · JPL
26243 Sallyfenska	1998 QE_{42}	Sallyfenska	August 17, 1998	Socorro	LINEAR	·	2.9 km	MPC · JPL
26244	1998 QB_{43}	—	August 19, 1998	Socorro	LINEAR	CLO	7.3 km	MPC · JPL
26245	1998 QR_{45}	—	August 17, 1998	Socorro	LINEAR	PHO	2.8 km	MPC · JPL
26246 Mikelake	1998 QN_{46}	Mikelake	August 17, 1998	Socorro	LINEAR	NYS	5.0 km	MPC · JPL
26247 Doleonardi	1998 QW_{47}	Doleonardi	August 17, 1998	Socorro	LINEAR	·	3.3 km	MPC · JPL
26248 Longenecker	1998 QZ_{48}	Longenecker	August 17, 1998	Socorro	LINEAR	·	2.5 km	MPC · JPL
26249	1998 QV_{50}	—	August 17, 1998	Socorro	LINEAR	·	3.8 km	MPC · JPL
26250 Shaneludwig	1998 QP_{51}	Shaneludwig	August 17, 1998	Socorro	LINEAR	·	2.5 km	MPC · JPL
26251 Kiranmanne	1998 QG_{52}	Kiranmanne	August 17, 1998	Socorro	LINEAR	·	2.8 km	MPC · JPL
26252 Chase	1998 QV_{54}	Chase	August 27, 1998	Anderson Mesa	LONEOS	·	2.7 km	MPC · JPL
26253	1998 QB_{56}	—	August 29, 1998	Višnjan Observatory	Višnjan	·	2.6 km	MPC · JPL
26254	1998 QE_{57}	—	August 30, 1998	Kitt Peak	Spacewatch	·	2.7 km	MPC · JPL
26255 Carmarques	1998 QW_{68}	Carmarques	August 24, 1998	Socorro	LINEAR	·	2.1 km	MPC · JPL
26256	1998 QC_{73}	—	August 24, 1998	Socorro	LINEAR	EUN	3.2 km	MPC · JPL
26257	1998 QL_{84}	—	August 24, 1998	Socorro	LINEAR	EUN	6.2 km	MPC · JPL
26258	1998 QA_{89}	—	August 24, 1998	Socorro	LINEAR	·	2.1 km	MPC · JPL
26259 Marzigliano	1998 QK_{108}	Marzigliano	August 17, 1998	Socorro	LINEAR	·	2.5 km	MPC · JPL
26260	1998 RA_{2}	—	September 14, 1998	Catalina	CSS	ADE	11 km	MPC · JPL
26261 Tinafreeman	1998 RL_{6}	Tinafreeman	September 14, 1998	Anderson Mesa	LONEOS	·	3.3 km	MPC · JPL
26262	1998 RW_{15}	—	September 14, 1998	Xinglong	SCAP	·	2.8 km	MPC · JPL
26263	1998 RC_{16}	—	September 14, 1998	Xinglong	SCAP	·	2.9 km	MPC · JPL
26264 McIntyre	1998 RH_{44}	McIntyre	September 14, 1998	Socorro	LINEAR	·	1.8 km	MPC · JPL
26265	1998 RQ_{46}	—	September 14, 1998	Socorro	LINEAR	·	1.9 km	MPC · JPL
26266 Andrewmerrill	1998 RW_{47}	Andrewmerrill	September 14, 1998	Socorro	LINEAR	V	2.2 km	MPC · JPL
26267 Nickmorgan	1998 RS_{50}	Nickmorgan	September 14, 1998	Socorro	LINEAR	·	2.5 km	MPC · JPL
26268 Nardi	1998 RY_{55}	Nardi	September 14, 1998	Socorro	LINEAR	·	1.9 km	MPC · JPL
26269 Marciaprill	1998 RG_{57}	Marciaprill	September 14, 1998	Socorro	LINEAR	NYS	3.2 km	MPC · JPL
26270	1998 RL_{62}	—	September 14, 1998	Socorro	LINEAR	EUN	4.2 km	MPC · JPL
26271 Lindapuster	1998 RW_{63}	Lindapuster	September 14, 1998	Socorro	LINEAR	·	2.5 km	MPC · JPL
26272	1998 RV_{66}	—	September 14, 1998	Socorro	LINEAR	·	2.8 km	MPC · JPL
26273 Kateschafer	1998 RD_{71}	Kateschafer	September 14, 1998	Socorro	LINEAR	·	2.5 km	MPC · JPL
26274	1998 RH_{75}	—	September 14, 1998	Socorro	LINEAR	PHO	4.5 km	MPC · JPL
26275 Jefsoulier	1998 SN_{1}	Jefsoulier	September 16, 1998	Caussols	ODAS	·	3.3 km	MPC · JPL
26276 Natrees	1998 SL_{4}	Natrees	September 20, 1998	Prescott	P. G. Comba	·	2.4 km	MPC · JPL
26277 Ianrees	1998 SM_{4}	Ianrees	September 20, 1998	Prescott	P. G. Comba	NYS	4.2 km	MPC · JPL
26278	1998 SK_{8}	—	September 20, 1998	Kitt Peak	Spacewatch	EUN	3.5 km	MPC · JPL
26279	1998 SP_{21}	—	September 21, 1998	Kitt Peak	Spacewatch	·	2.4 km	MPC · JPL
26280	1998 SW_{22}	—	September 20, 1998	Woomera	F. B. Zoltowski	·	6.6 km	MPC · JPL
26281	1998 ST_{43}	—	September 25, 1998	Xinglong	SCAP	NYS	4.5 km	MPC · JPL
26282 Noahbrosch	1998 SD_{56}	Noahbrosch	September 16, 1998	Anderson Mesa	LONEOS	·	3.6 km	MPC · JPL
26283 Oswalt	1998 ST_{58}	Oswalt	September 17, 1998	Anderson Mesa	LONEOS	·	3.0 km	MPC · JPL
26284 Johnspahn	1998 SZ_{59}	Johnspahn	September 17, 1998	Anderson Mesa	LONEOS	·	4.6 km	MPC · JPL
26285 Lindaspahn	1998 SS_{61}	Lindaspahn	September 17, 1998	Anderson Mesa	LONEOS	·	6.0 km	MPC · JPL
26286	1998 SV_{65}	—	September 20, 1998	La Silla	E. W. Elst	PHO	6.2 km	MPC · JPL
26287	1998 SD_{67}	—	September 20, 1998	La Silla	E. W. Elst	·	4.2 km	MPC · JPL
26288	1998 SA_{73}	—	September 21, 1998	La Silla	E. W. Elst	BAP	2.9 km	MPC · JPL
26289	1998 SL_{74}	—	September 21, 1998	La Silla	E. W. Elst	·	8.5 km	MPC · JPL
26290	1998 SX_{101}	—	September 26, 1998	Socorro	LINEAR	·	3.0 km	MPC · JPL
26291 Terristaples	1998 SU_{106}	Terristaples	September 26, 1998	Socorro	LINEAR	NYS	2.5 km	MPC · JPL
26292	1998 SJ_{109}	—	September 26, 1998	Socorro	LINEAR	·	7.8 km	MPC · JPL
26293 Van Muyden	1998 SD_{110}	Van Muyden	September 26, 1998	Socorro	LINEAR	·	3.7 km	MPC · JPL
26294	1998 SF_{111}	—	September 26, 1998	Socorro	LINEAR	NYS	1.7 km	MPC · JPL
26295 Vilardi	1998 SD_{112}	Vilardi	September 26, 1998	Socorro	LINEAR	·	3.4 km	MPC · JPL
26296	1998 SM_{116}	—	September 26, 1998	Socorro	LINEAR	·	5.9 km	MPC · JPL
26297	1998 SK_{118}	—	September 26, 1998	Socorro	LINEAR	V	3.2 km	MPC · JPL
26298 Dunweathers	1998 SD_{124}	Dunweathers	September 26, 1998	Socorro	LINEAR	·	2.7 km	MPC · JPL
26299	1998 SG_{133}	—	September 26, 1998	Socorro	LINEAR	MAR	4.5 km	MPC · JPL
26300 Herbweiss	1998 ST_{134}	Herbweiss	September 26, 1998	Socorro	LINEAR	·	4.7 km	MPC · JPL

== 26301–26400 ==
back to top

Designation			Discovery			Properties		Ref
Permanent	Provisional	Named after	Date	Site	Discoverer(s)	Category	Diam.	Ref
26301 Hellawillis	1998 SB_{136}	Hellawillis	September 26, 1998	Socorro	LINEAR	·	3.1 km	MPC · JPL
26302 Zimolzak	1998 ST_{142}	Zimolzak	September 26, 1998	Socorro	LINEAR	·	2.2 km	MPC · JPL
26303	1998 SD_{144}	—	September 18, 1998	La Silla	E. W. Elst	HNS	3.4 km	MPC · JPL
26304	1998 SZ_{145}	—	September 20, 1998	La Silla	E. W. Elst	·	2.8 km	MPC · JPL
26305	1998 SH_{146}	—	September 20, 1998	La Silla	E. W. Elst	·	2.7 km	MPC · JPL
26306	1998 SX_{147}	—	September 20, 1998	La Silla	E. W. Elst	MAS	2.6 km	MPC · JPL
26307 Friedafein	1998 SE_{163}	Friedafein	September 26, 1998	Socorro	LINEAR	·	2.7 km	MPC · JPL
26308	1998 SM_{165}	—	September 16, 1998	Steward Observatory	Danzl, N.	twotino · moon	287 km	MPC · JPL
26309	1998 TG	—	October 10, 1998	Oizumi	T. Kobayashi	NYS	2.7 km	MPC · JPL
26310	1998 TX_{6}	—	October 14, 1998	Kitt Peak	Spacewatch	AMO	490 m	MPC · JPL
26311	1998 TR_{16}	—	October 14, 1998	Caussols	ODAS	·	2.6 km	MPC · JPL
26312 Ciardi	1998 TG_{34}	Ciardi	October 14, 1998	Anderson Mesa	LONEOS	·	2.9 km	MPC · JPL
26313 Lorilombardi	1998 TK_{34}	Lorilombardi	October 14, 1998	Anderson Mesa	LONEOS	·	2.0 km	MPC · JPL
26314 Škvorecký	1998 UJ_{1}	Škvorecký	October 16, 1998	Kleť	J. Tichá, M. Tichý	·	2.1 km	MPC · JPL
26315	1998 UF_{4}	—	October 21, 1998	Višnjan Observatory	K. Korlević	·	5.1 km	MPC · JPL
26316	1998 US_{16}	—	October 22, 1998	Reedy Creek	J. Broughton	(2076)	3.6 km	MPC · JPL
26317	1998 UB_{17}	—	October 27, 1998	Catalina	CSS	PHO	2.9 km	MPC · JPL
26318	1998 UC_{20}	—	October 28, 1998	Višnjan Observatory	K. Korlević	NYS	2.1 km	MPC · JPL
26319 Miyauchi	1998 UM_{23}	Miyauchi	October 26, 1998	Nanyo	T. Okuni	V	2.9 km	MPC · JPL
26320	1998 UD_{27}	—	October 18, 1998	La Silla	E. W. Elst	NEM	6.8 km	MPC · JPL
26321	1998 VT_{5}	—	November 11, 1998	Gnosca	S. Sposetti	·	10 km	MPC · JPL
26322	1998 VS_{6}	—	November 12, 1998	Oizumi	T. Kobayashi	fast	4.8 km	MPC · JPL
26323 Wuqijin	1998 VX_{8}	Wuqijin	November 10, 1998	Socorro	LINEAR	V	3.2 km	MPC · JPL
26324	1998 VG_{16}	—	November 10, 1998	Socorro	LINEAR	·	9.4 km	MPC · JPL
26325	1998 VD_{29}	—	November 10, 1998	Socorro	LINEAR	·	23 km	MPC · JPL
26326	1998 VD_{36}	—	November 14, 1998	Socorro	LINEAR	NYS	2.5 km	MPC · JPL
26327	1998 VQ_{38}	—	November 10, 1998	Socorro	LINEAR	·	3.9 km	MPC · JPL
26328 Litomyšl	1998 WQ	Litomyšl	November 18, 1998	Kleť	M. Tichý, Z. Moravec	·	5.0 km	MPC · JPL
26329 Cleoabram	1998 WC_{1}	Cleoabram	November 16, 1998	Catalina	CSS	PHO	4.3 km	MPC · JPL
26330	1998 WN_{5}	—	November 20, 1998	Gekko	T. Kagawa	·	4.5 km	MPC · JPL
26331 Kondamuri	1998 WC_{10}	Kondamuri	November 21, 1998	Socorro	LINEAR	V	2.4 km	MPC · JPL
26332 Alyssehrlich	1998 WW_{10}	Alyssehrlich	November 21, 1998	Socorro	LINEAR	·	4.1 km	MPC · JPL
26333 Joachim	1998 WU_{11}	Joachim	November 21, 1998	Socorro	LINEAR	·	3.3 km	MPC · JPL
26334 Melimcdowell	1998 WD_{15}	Melimcdowell	November 21, 1998	Socorro	LINEAR	KOR	4.0 km	MPC · JPL
26335	1998 WT_{16}	—	November 21, 1998	Socorro	LINEAR	·	3.5 km	MPC · JPL
26336 Mikemcdowell	1998 WC_{17}	Mikemcdowell	November 21, 1998	Socorro	LINEAR	(12739)	7.8 km	MPC · JPL
26337 Matthewagam	1998 WJ_{19}	Matthewagam	November 21, 1998	Socorro	LINEAR	NYS	4.3 km	MPC · JPL
26338	1998 WT_{35}	—	November 19, 1998	Kitt Peak	Spacewatch	·	3.4 km	MPC · JPL
26339	1998 XT_{3}	—	December 9, 1998	Oizumi	T. Kobayashi	·	6.5 km	MPC · JPL
26340 Evamarková	1998 XY_{8}	Evamarková	December 13, 1998	Kleť	J. Tichá, M. Tichý	·	5.3 km	MPC · JPL
26341	1998 XK_{9}	—	December 9, 1998	Višnjan Observatory	K. Korlević	·	3.4 km	MPC · JPL
26342	1998 XM_{52}	—	December 14, 1998	Socorro	LINEAR	·	6.2 km	MPC · JPL
26343	1998 XB_{53}	—	December 14, 1998	Socorro	LINEAR	EUN	5.2 km	MPC · JPL
26344	1998 XS_{76}	—	December 15, 1998	Socorro	LINEAR	AGN	6.7 km	MPC · JPL
26345 Gedankien	1998 XQ_{77}	Gedankien	December 15, 1998	Socorro	LINEAR	·	3.1 km	MPC · JPL
26346	1998 XF_{93}	—	December 15, 1998	Socorro	LINEAR	EOS	9.6 km	MPC · JPL
26347	1998 XU_{93}	—	December 15, 1998	Socorro	LINEAR	·	4.5 km	MPC · JPL
26348	1998 XO_{94}	—	December 15, 1998	Socorro	LINEAR	MAR	6.4 km	MPC · JPL
26349	1998 XR_{94}	—	December 15, 1998	Socorro	LINEAR	·	13 km	MPC · JPL
26350	1998 XU_{94}	—	December 15, 1998	Socorro	LINEAR	EOS	5.5 km	MPC · JPL
26351	1998 XG_{95}	—	December 15, 1998	Socorro	LINEAR	·	5.4 km	MPC · JPL
26352	1998 XJ_{95}	—	December 15, 1998	Socorro	LINEAR	·	11 km	MPC · JPL
26353	1998 YP	—	December 16, 1998	Oizumi	T. Kobayashi	MAR	6.1 km	MPC · JPL
26354	1998 YJ_{4}	—	December 16, 1998	Woomera	F. B. Zoltowski	·	13 km	MPC · JPL
26355 Grueber	1998 YL_{8}	Grueber	December 23, 1998	Linz	E. Meyer	·	5.6 km	MPC · JPL
26356 Aventini	1998 YE_{10}	Aventini	December 26, 1998	San Marcello	L. Tesi, A. Boattini	·	6.5 km	MPC · JPL
26357 Laguerre	1998 YK_{10}	Laguerre	December 27, 1998	Prescott	P. G. Comba	EUN	4.3 km	MPC · JPL
26358	1998 YZ_{11}	—	December 26, 1998	Oizumi	T. Kobayashi	·	3.0 km	MPC · JPL
26359	1998 YF_{12}	—	December 27, 1998	Oizumi	T. Kobayashi	EOS	9.9 km	MPC · JPL
26360	1998 YL_{13}	—	December 17, 1998	Kitt Peak	Spacewatch	·	5.2 km	MPC · JPL
26361	1999 AJ_{5}	—	January 10, 1999	Nachi-Katsuura	Y. Shimizu, T. Urata	·	6.1 km	MPC · JPL
26362	1999 AC_{6}	—	January 7, 1999	Socorro	LINEAR	·	5.1 km	MPC · JPL
26363	1999 AG_{6}	—	January 8, 1999	Socorro	LINEAR	EUN	6.9 km	MPC · JPL
26364	1999 AH_{8}	—	January 13, 1999	Oizumi	T. Kobayashi	URS	15 km	MPC · JPL
26365	1999 AK_{21}	—	January 14, 1999	Višnjan Observatory	K. Korlević	slow	6.4 km	MPC · JPL
26366	1999 AM_{21}	—	January 14, 1999	Višnjan Observatory	K. Korlević	NYS	3.4 km	MPC · JPL
26367	1999 CD_{1}	—	February 2, 1999	Dynic	A. Sugie	·	7.6 km	MPC · JPL
26368 Alghunaim	1999 CJ_{37}	Alghunaim	February 10, 1999	Socorro	LINEAR	·	8.3 km	MPC · JPL
26369	1999 CG_{62}	—	February 12, 1999	Socorro	LINEAR	·	24 km	MPC · JPL
26370	1999 CJ_{62}	—	February 12, 1999	Socorro	LINEAR	EOS	9.8 km	MPC · JPL
26371	1999 CT_{64}	—	February 12, 1999	Socorro	LINEAR	·	13 km	MPC · JPL
26372	1999 CW_{69}	—	February 12, 1999	Socorro	LINEAR	EUN	4.8 km	MPC · JPL
26373	1999 CZ_{74}	—	February 12, 1999	Socorro	LINEAR	EOS · slow	9.6 km	MPC · JPL
26374	1999 CP_{106}	—	February 12, 1999	Socorro	LINEAR	fast	5.0 km	MPC · JPL
26375	1999 DE_{9}	—	February 20, 1999	Kitt Peak	C. A. Trujillo, J. X. Luu	res · 2:5	311 km	MPC · JPL
26376 Roborosa	1999 EB_{3}	Roborosa	March 11, 1999	Ondřejov	P. Pravec	·	4.0 km	MPC · JPL
26377	1999 FH_{4}	—	March 16, 1999	Kitt Peak	Spacewatch	·	7.6 km	MPC · JPL
26378	1999 GF_{35}	—	April 6, 1999	Socorro	LINEAR	EOS	8.9 km	MPC · JPL
26379	1999 HZ_{1}	—	April 20, 1999	Socorro	LINEAR	APO +1km	810 m	MPC · JPL
26380	1999 JY_{65}	—	May 12, 1999	Socorro	LINEAR	·	10 km	MPC · JPL
26381	1999 KV_{15}	—	May 18, 1999	Socorro	LINEAR	·	7.3 km	MPC · JPL
26382 Charlieduke	1999 LT_{32}	Charlieduke	June 8, 1999	Anderson Mesa	LONEOS	·	23 km	MPC · JPL
26383	1999 MA_{2}	—	June 20, 1999	Catalina	CSS	H	1.8 km	MPC · JPL
26384	1999 QP_{2}	—	August 31, 1999	Xinglong	SCAP	·	6.0 km	MPC · JPL
26385	1999 RN_{20}	—	September 7, 1999	Socorro	LINEAR	·	1.9 km	MPC · JPL
26386 Adelinacozma	1999 RC_{171}	Adelinacozma	September 9, 1999	Socorro	LINEAR	·	2.3 km	MPC · JPL
26387	1999 TG_{2}	—	October 2, 1999	Fountain Hills	C. W. Juels	GEF	7.2 km	MPC · JPL
26388	1999 TR_{105}	—	October 3, 1999	Socorro	LINEAR	·	3.3 km	MPC · JPL
26389 Poojarambhia	1999 TO_{151}	Poojarambhia	October 7, 1999	Socorro	LINEAR	·	5.1 km	MPC · JPL
26390 Rušin	1999 UX_{2}	Rušin	October 19, 1999	Ondřejov	P. Kušnirák	MAR	3.5 km	MPC · JPL
26391	1999 VN_{9}	—	November 8, 1999	Višnjan Observatory	K. Korlević	·	4.4 km	MPC · JPL
26392	1999 VT_{10}	—	November 9, 1999	Oizumi	T. Kobayashi	·	2.6 km	MPC · JPL
26393 Scaffa	1999 VT_{35}	Scaffa	November 3, 1999	Socorro	LINEAR	·	1.9 km	MPC · JPL
26394 Kandola	1999 VE_{53}	Kandola	November 3, 1999	Socorro	LINEAR	SUL	6.8 km	MPC · JPL
26395 Megkurohara	1999 VK_{150}	Megkurohara	November 14, 1999	Socorro	LINEAR	·	2.6 km	MPC · JPL
26396 Chengjingjie	1999 VQ_{169}	Chengjingjie	November 14, 1999	Socorro	LINEAR	·	6.0 km	MPC · JPL
26397 Carolynsinow	1999 VB_{185}	Carolynsinow	November 15, 1999	Socorro	LINEAR	·	6.2 km	MPC · JPL
26398	1999 VL_{188}	—	November 15, 1999	Socorro	LINEAR	·	5.2 km	MPC · JPL
26399 Rileyennis	1999 VG_{189}	Rileyennis	November 15, 1999	Socorro	LINEAR	·	2.1 km	MPC · JPL
26400 Roshanpalli	1999 VJ_{190}	Roshanpalli	November 15, 1999	Socorro	LINEAR	·	1.8 km	MPC · JPL

== 26401–26500 ==
back to top

Designation			Discovery			Properties		Ref
Permanent	Provisional	Named after	Date	Site	Discoverer(s)	Category	Diam.	Ref
26401 Sobotište	1999 WX	Sobotište	November 19, 1999	Ondřejov	P. Kušnirák	·	3.1 km	MPC · JPL
26402	1999 WB_{5}	—	November 28, 1999	Oizumi	T. Kobayashi	NYS	3.7 km	MPC · JPL
26403	1999 WF_{18}	—	November 30, 1999	Socorro	LINEAR	EUN	5.3 km	MPC · JPL
26404	1999 XF_{1}	—	December 2, 1999	Oizumi	T. Kobayashi	·	3.9 km	MPC · JPL
26405	1999 XS_{15}	—	December 5, 1999	Višnjan Observatory	K. Korlević	·	6.0 km	MPC · JPL
26406	1999 XZ_{21}	—	December 5, 1999	Socorro	LINEAR	·	8.0 km	MPC · JPL
26407	1999 XT_{24}	—	December 6, 1999	Socorro	LINEAR	·	3.2 km	MPC · JPL
26408	1999 XO_{33}	—	December 6, 1999	Socorro	LINEAR	EUN	4.8 km	MPC · JPL
26409	1999 XV_{33}	—	December 6, 1999	Socorro	LINEAR	·	2.9 km	MPC · JPL
26410	1999 XZ_{34}	—	December 6, 1999	Socorro	LINEAR	EOS	7.6 km	MPC · JPL
26411 Jocorbferg	1999 XA_{40}	Jocorbferg	December 6, 1999	Socorro	LINEAR	V	2.2 km	MPC · JPL
26412 Charlesyu	1999 XR_{60}	Charlesyu	December 7, 1999	Socorro	LINEAR	·	4.5 km	MPC · JPL
26413	1999 XB_{62}	—	December 7, 1999	Socorro	LINEAR	·	1.9 km	MPC · JPL
26414 Amychyao	1999 XS_{65}	Amychyao	December 7, 1999	Socorro	LINEAR	·	4.2 km	MPC · JPL
26415	1999 XK_{83}	—	December 7, 1999	Socorro	LINEAR	·	3.9 km	MPC · JPL
26416	1999 XM_{84}	—	December 7, 1999	Socorro	LINEAR	moon	4.9 km	MPC · JPL
26417 Michaelgord	1999 XO_{87}	Michaelgord	December 7, 1999	Socorro	LINEAR	·	2.3 km	MPC · JPL
26418	1999 XP_{94}	—	December 7, 1999	Socorro	LINEAR	ADE	7.2 km	MPC · JPL
26419	1999 XR_{95}	—	December 7, 1999	Oizumi	T. Kobayashi	EUN	5.5 km	MPC · JPL
26420	1999 XL_{103}	—	December 7, 1999	Socorro	LINEAR	moon	1.9 km	MPC · JPL
26421	1999 XP_{113}	—	December 11, 1999	Socorro	LINEAR	EUN	5.5 km	MPC · JPL
26422 Marekbuchman	1999 XV_{131}	Marekbuchman	December 12, 1999	Socorro	LINEAR	·	5.1 km	MPC · JPL
26423	1999 XN_{140}	—	December 2, 1999	Kitt Peak	Spacewatch	·	2.1 km	MPC · JPL
26424 Jacquelihung	1999 XT_{152}	Jacquelihung	December 7, 1999	Socorro	LINEAR	·	2.7 km	MPC · JPL
26425 Linchichieh	1999 XR_{156}	Linchichieh	December 8, 1999	Socorro	LINEAR	·	2.3 km	MPC · JPL
26426 Koechl	1999 XB_{158}	Koechl	December 8, 1999	Socorro	LINEAR	·	2.8 km	MPC · JPL
26427	1999 XG_{165}	—	December 8, 1999	Socorro	LINEAR	MAR	4.7 km	MPC · JPL
26428	1999 XR_{169}	—	December 10, 1999	Socorro	LINEAR	·	7.0 km	MPC · JPL
26429 Andiwagner	1999 XG_{170}	Andiwagner	December 10, 1999	Socorro	LINEAR	(5)	4.0 km	MPC · JPL
26430 Thomwilkason	1999 XW_{176}	Thomwilkason	December 10, 1999	Socorro	LINEAR	·	3.4 km	MPC · JPL
26431	1999 XT_{193}	—	December 12, 1999	Socorro	LINEAR	PHO	2.5 km	MPC · JPL
26432	1999 XZ_{202}	—	December 12, 1999	Socorro	LINEAR	EUN	5.6 km	MPC · JPL
26433 Michaelyurko	1999 XK_{215}	Michaelyurko	December 14, 1999	Socorro	LINEAR	·	2.6 km	MPC · JPL
26434	1999 XQ_{216}	—	December 13, 1999	Kitt Peak	Spacewatch	·	5.9 km	MPC · JPL
26435 Juliebrisset	1999 XS_{241}	Juliebrisset	December 13, 1999	Anderson Mesa	LONEOS	·	4.7 km	MPC · JPL
26436	1999 YV_{4}	—	December 28, 1999	Farpoint	G. Hug, G. Bell	·	2.6 km	MPC · JPL
26437	1999 YD_{8}	—	December 27, 1999	Kitt Peak	Spacewatch	·	3.0 km	MPC · JPL
26438 Durling	1999 YE_{13}	Durling	December 30, 1999	Anderson Mesa	LONEOS	·	2.4 km	MPC · JPL
26439	2000 AZ_{1}	—	January 2, 2000	Višnjan Observatory	K. Korlević	·	4.5 km	MPC · JPL
26440	2000 AA_{4}	—	January 3, 2000	Socorro	LINEAR	·	7.1 km	MPC · JPL
26441 Nanayakkara	2000 AX_{33}	Nanayakkara	January 3, 2000	Socorro	LINEAR	·	7.7 km	MPC · JPL
26442 Matfernandez	2000 AK_{41}	Matfernandez	January 3, 2000	Socorro	LINEAR	·	4.1 km	MPC · JPL
26443	2000 AT_{50}	—	January 5, 2000	Fountain Hills	C. W. Juels	ADE	9.7 km	MPC · JPL
26444	2000 AB_{58}	—	January 4, 2000	Socorro	LINEAR	·	7.6 km	MPC · JPL
26445	2000 AY_{61}	—	January 4, 2000	Socorro	LINEAR	·	9.0 km	MPC · JPL
26446	2000 AE_{64}	—	January 4, 2000	Socorro	LINEAR	·	8.2 km	MPC · JPL
26447 Akrishnan	2000 AX_{67}	Akrishnan	January 4, 2000	Socorro	LINEAR	NYS · slow	3.9 km	MPC · JPL
26448 Tongjili	2000 AC_{76}	Tongjili	January 5, 2000	Socorro	LINEAR	·	3.2 km	MPC · JPL
26449	2000 AJ_{85}	—	January 5, 2000	Socorro	LINEAR	V	3.4 km	MPC · JPL
26450 Tanyapetach	2000 AQ_{85}	Tanyapetach	January 5, 2000	Socorro	LINEAR	·	3.8 km	MPC · JPL
26451 Khweis	2000 AB_{86}	Khweis	January 5, 2000	Socorro	LINEAR	·	2.4 km	MPC · JPL
26452	2000 AU_{87}	—	January 5, 2000	Socorro	LINEAR	·	2.4 km	MPC · JPL
26453	2000 AH_{89}	—	January 5, 2000	Socorro	LINEAR	·	2.7 km	MPC · JPL
26454	2000 AQ_{89}	—	January 5, 2000	Socorro	LINEAR	V	3.1 km	MPC · JPL
26455 Priyamshah	2000 AP_{95}	Priyamshah	January 4, 2000	Socorro	LINEAR	·	4.7 km	MPC · JPL
26456	2000 AY_{101}	—	January 5, 2000	Socorro	LINEAR	·	6.2 km	MPC · JPL
26457 Naomishah	2000 AL_{105}	Naomishah	January 5, 2000	Socorro	LINEAR	·	2.3 km	MPC · JPL
26458 Choihyuna	2000 AC_{110}	Choihyuna	January 5, 2000	Socorro	LINEAR	·	2.3 km	MPC · JPL
26459 Shinsubin	2000 AD_{117}	Shinsubin	January 5, 2000	Socorro	LINEAR	V	1.7 km	MPC · JPL
26460	2000 AZ_{120}	—	January 5, 2000	Socorro	LINEAR	·	5.5 km	MPC · JPL
26461	2000 AW_{124}	—	January 5, 2000	Socorro	LINEAR	·	5.0 km	MPC · JPL
26462 Albertcui	2000 AL_{126}	Albertcui	January 5, 2000	Socorro	LINEAR	V	3.2 km	MPC · JPL
26463	2000 AW_{137}	—	January 4, 2000	Socorro	LINEAR	MAR	5.2 km	MPC · JPL
26464	2000 AA_{138}	—	January 4, 2000	Socorro	LINEAR	DOR	7.7 km	MPC · JPL
26465	2000 AF_{140}	—	January 5, 2000	Socorro	LINEAR	·	4.9 km	MPC · JPL
26466 Zarrin	2000 AA_{142}	Zarrin	January 5, 2000	Socorro	LINEAR	·	2.9 km	MPC · JPL
26467 Jamespopper	2000 AX_{142}	Jamespopper	January 5, 2000	Socorro	LINEAR	V	3.1 km	MPC · JPL
26468 Ianchan	2000 AO_{143}	Ianchan	January 5, 2000	Socorro	LINEAR	·	3.5 km	MPC · JPL
26469	2000 AE_{147}	—	January 5, 2000	Socorro	LINEAR	·	5.5 km	MPC · JPL
26470	2000 AT_{150}	—	January 8, 2000	Socorro	LINEAR	EUN	3.6 km	MPC · JPL
26471 Tracybecker	2000 AS_{152}	Tracybecker	January 8, 2000	Socorro	LINEAR	H · moon	5.0 km	MPC · JPL
26472	2000 AC_{162}	—	January 4, 2000	Socorro	LINEAR	·	6.7 km	MPC · JPL
26473	2000 AD_{171}	—	January 7, 2000	Socorro	LINEAR	EUN	4.8 km	MPC · JPL
26474 Davidsimon	2000 AA_{175}	Davidsimon	January 7, 2000	Socorro	LINEAR	·	4.6 km	MPC · JPL
26475 Krisztisugar	2000 AD_{185}	Krisztisugar	January 7, 2000	Socorro	LINEAR	V	2.8 km	MPC · JPL
26476	2000 AK_{185}	—	January 7, 2000	Socorro	LINEAR	·	4.2 km	MPC · JPL
26477	2000 AF_{197}	—	January 8, 2000	Socorro	LINEAR	·	4.9 km	MPC · JPL
26478 Cristianrosu	2000 AM_{197}	Cristianrosu	January 8, 2000	Socorro	LINEAR	GEF	4.8 km	MPC · JPL
26479	2000 AE_{198}	—	January 8, 2000	Socorro	LINEAR	·	5.5 km	MPC · JPL
26480	2000 AG_{198}	—	January 8, 2000	Socorro	LINEAR	·	5.7 km	MPC · JPL
26481	2000 AS_{200}	—	January 9, 2000	Socorro	LINEAR	EUN	4.4 km	MPC · JPL
26482	2000 AM_{203}	—	January 10, 2000	Socorro	LINEAR	(1118)	22 km	MPC · JPL
26483	2000 AX_{204}	—	January 10, 2000	Socorro	LINEAR	PHO	11 km	MPC · JPL
26484	2000 AZ_{215}	—	January 7, 2000	Kitt Peak	Spacewatch	·	8.1 km	MPC · JPL
26485 Edwinpost	2000 AD_{231}	Edwinpost	January 4, 2000	Anderson Mesa	LONEOS	·	6.7 km	MPC · JPL
26486	2000 AQ_{231}	—	January 4, 2000	Socorro	LINEAR	L4 · slow?	14 km	MPC · JPL
26487	2000 AV_{236}	—	January 5, 2000	Socorro	LINEAR	·	4.0 km	MPC · JPL
26488 Beiser	2000 AB_{242}	Beiser	January 7, 2000	Anderson Mesa	LONEOS	·	5.2 km	MPC · JPL
26489	2000 AS_{242}	—	January 7, 2000	Socorro	LINEAR	·	7.4 km	MPC · JPL
26490	2000 AN_{245}	—	January 10, 2000	Socorro	LINEAR	EUN	3.6 km	MPC · JPL
26491	2000 BT_{3}	—	January 27, 2000	Oizumi	T. Kobayashi	·	10 km	MPC · JPL
26492	2000 BA_{13}	—	January 28, 2000	Kitt Peak	Spacewatch	·	4.2 km	MPC · JPL
26493 Paulsucala	2000 BQ_{16}	Paulsucala	January 30, 2000	Socorro	LINEAR	·	3.6 km	MPC · JPL
26494	2000 BR_{22}	—	January 26, 2000	Višnjan Observatory	K. Korlević	·	3.2 km	MPC · JPL
26495 Eichorn	2000 BX_{22}	Eichorn	January 30, 2000	Catalina	CSS	V	2.3 km	MPC · JPL
26496	2000 CE_{1}	—	February 4, 2000	Višnjan Observatory	K. Korlević	·	3.0 km	MPC · JPL
26497	2000 CS_{1}	—	February 3, 2000	San Marcello	A. Boattini, G. Forti	·	8.5 km	MPC · JPL
26498 Dinotina	2000 CV_{1}	Dinotina	February 4, 2000	Pian dei Termini	A. Boattini, L. Tesi	·	9.9 km	MPC · JPL
26499 Robertazabotti	2000 CX_{1}	Robertazabotti	February 4, 2000	San Marcello	A. Boattini, M. Tombelli	·	11 km	MPC · JPL
26500 Toshiohino	2000 CC_{2}	Toshiohino	February 2, 2000	Oizumi	T. Kobayashi	·	6.2 km	MPC · JPL

== 26501–26600 ==
back to top

Designation			Discovery			Properties		Ref
Permanent	Provisional	Named after	Date	Site	Discoverer(s)	Category	Diam.	Ref
26501 Sachiko	2000 CP_{2}	Sachiko	February 2, 2000	Oizumi	T. Kobayashi	EUN	5.4 km	MPC · JPL
26502 Traviscole	2000 CQ_{5}	Traviscole	February 2, 2000	Socorro	LINEAR	·	2.6 km	MPC · JPL
26503 Avicramer	2000 CA_{9}	Avicramer	February 2, 2000	Socorro	LINEAR	·	3.4 km	MPC · JPL
26504 Brandonli	2000 CM_{17}	Brandonli	February 2, 2000	Socorro	LINEAR	(2076)	3.1 km	MPC · JPL
26505 Olextokarev	2000 CX_{21}	Olextokarev	February 2, 2000	Socorro	LINEAR	·	3.4 km	MPC · JPL
26506	2000 CO_{25}	—	February 2, 2000	Socorro	LINEAR	NAE	8.4 km	MPC · JPL
26507 Mikelin	2000 CC_{29}	Mikelin	February 2, 2000	Socorro	LINEAR	fast	5.4 km	MPC · JPL
26508 Jimmylin	2000 CD_{29}	Jimmylin	February 2, 2000	Socorro	LINEAR	·	3.2 km	MPC · JPL
26509	2000 CJ_{34}	—	February 5, 2000	Višnjan Observatory	K. Korlević	·	3.4 km	MPC · JPL
26510	2000 CZ_{34}	—	February 2, 2000	Socorro	LINEAR	L4	14 km	MPC · JPL
26511	2000 CB_{39}	—	February 3, 2000	Socorro	LINEAR	GEF	4.7 km	MPC · JPL
26512	2000 CL_{46}	—	February 2, 2000	Socorro	LINEAR	EOS	6.4 km	MPC · JPL
26513 Newberry	2000 CP_{47}	Newberry	February 2, 2000	Socorro	LINEAR	·	3.4 km	MPC · JPL
26514	2000 CH_{48}	—	February 2, 2000	Socorro	LINEAR	·	7.2 km	MPC · JPL
26515	2000 CJ_{53}	—	February 2, 2000	Socorro	LINEAR	EOS	6.6 km	MPC · JPL
26516	2000 CW_{56}	—	February 4, 2000	Socorro	LINEAR	LIX	14 km	MPC · JPL
26517	2000 CG_{62}	—	February 2, 2000	Socorro	LINEAR	PHO	3.2 km	MPC · JPL
26518 Bhuiyan	2000 CM_{65}	Bhuiyan	February 4, 2000	Socorro	LINEAR	·	7.0 km	MPC · JPL
26519	2000 CU_{70}	—	February 7, 2000	Socorro	LINEAR	VER	9.6 km	MPC · JPL
26520	2000 CQ_{75}	—	February 6, 2000	Socorro	LINEAR	·	8.1 km	MPC · JPL
26521	2000 CS_{76}	—	February 10, 2000	Višnjan Observatory	K. Korlević	·	10 km	MPC · JPL
26522 Juliapoje	2000 CZ_{83}	Juliapoje	February 4, 2000	Socorro	LINEAR	·	9.1 km	MPC · JPL
26523	2000 CA_{84}	—	February 4, 2000	Socorro	LINEAR	THM	9.3 km	MPC · JPL
26524	2000 CY_{85}	—	February 4, 2000	Socorro	LINEAR	·	4.9 km	MPC · JPL
26525	2000 CD_{86}	—	February 4, 2000	Socorro	LINEAR	·	7.5 km	MPC · JPL
26526 Jookayhyun	2000 CP_{86}	Jookayhyun	February 4, 2000	Socorro	LINEAR	·	4.4 km	MPC · JPL
26527 Leasure	2000 CH_{87}	Leasure	February 4, 2000	Socorro	LINEAR	·	5.1 km	MPC · JPL
26528 Genniferubin	2000 CL_{92}	Genniferubin	February 6, 2000	Socorro	LINEAR	THM	9.4 km	MPC · JPL
26529	2000 CM_{94}	—	February 8, 2000	Socorro	LINEAR	·	4.7 km	MPC · JPL
26530 Lucferreira	2000 CY_{96}	Lucferreira	February 6, 2000	Socorro	LINEAR	·	5.1 km	MPC · JPL
26531	2000 CP_{100}	—	February 10, 2000	Kitt Peak	Spacewatch	KOR	3.8 km	MPC · JPL
26532 Eduardoboff	2000 CZ_{102}	Eduardoboff	February 6, 2000	Socorro	LINEAR	AGN	8.0 km	MPC · JPL
26533 Aldering	2000 CG_{108}	Aldering	February 5, 2000	Catalina	CSS	·	3.0 km	MPC · JPL
26534	2000 DA	—	February 16, 2000	Socorro	LINEAR	·	5.4 km	MPC · JPL
26535	2000 DG_{3}	—	February 27, 2000	Oizumi	T. Kobayashi	·	5.8 km	MPC · JPL
26536	2000 DL_{3}	—	February 27, 2000	Višnjan Observatory	K. Korlević, M. Jurić	·	8.7 km	MPC · JPL
26537 Shyamalbuch	2000 DA_{5}	Shyamalbuch	February 28, 2000	Socorro	LINEAR	·	4.0 km	MPC · JPL
26538	2000 DG_{7}	—	February 29, 2000	Oizumi	T. Kobayashi	EUN	5.4 km	MPC · JPL
26539	2000 DJ_{10}	—	February 26, 2000	Kitt Peak	Spacewatch	·	2.6 km	MPC · JPL
26540	2000 DF_{13}	—	February 28, 2000	Kitt Peak	Spacewatch	·	9.4 km	MPC · JPL
26541 Garyross	2000 DV_{15}	Garyross	February 27, 2000	Catalina	CSS	·	6.2 km	MPC · JPL
26542	2000 DA_{27}	—	February 29, 2000	Socorro	LINEAR	·	2.2 km	MPC · JPL
26543	2000 DJ_{33}	—	February 29, 2000	Socorro	LINEAR	·	2.7 km	MPC · JPL
26544 Ajjarapu	2000 DN_{37}	Ajjarapu	February 29, 2000	Socorro	LINEAR	·	3.9 km	MPC · JPL
26545 Meganperkins	2000 DK_{39}	Meganperkins	February 29, 2000	Socorro	LINEAR	·	2.4 km	MPC · JPL
26546 Arulmani	2000 DH_{41}	Arulmani	February 29, 2000	Socorro	LINEAR	·	5.9 km	MPC · JPL
26547	2000 DM_{41}	—	February 29, 2000	Socorro	LINEAR	EUN	4.2 km	MPC · JPL
26548 Joykutty	2000 DF_{56}	Joykutty	February 29, 2000	Socorro	LINEAR	·	7.1 km	MPC · JPL
26549 Tankanran	2000 DZ_{57}	Tankanran	February 29, 2000	Socorro	LINEAR	(2076)	3.1 km	MPC · JPL
26550	2000 DQ_{62}	—	February 29, 2000	Socorro	LINEAR	(1298)	8.8 km	MPC · JPL
26551 Shenliangbo	2000 DS_{73}	Shenliangbo	February 29, 2000	Socorro	LINEAR	·	3.5 km	MPC · JPL
26552	2000 DT_{74}	—	February 29, 2000	Socorro	LINEAR	·	7.8 km	MPC · JPL
26553	2000 DO_{75}	—	February 29, 2000	Socorro	LINEAR	CYB	5.8 km	MPC · JPL
26554	2000 DU_{82}	—	February 28, 2000	Socorro	LINEAR	·	2.9 km	MPC · JPL
26555	2000 DH_{101}	—	February 29, 2000	Socorro	LINEAR	·	9.8 km	MPC · JPL
26556	2000 DG_{107}	—	February 29, 2000	Socorro	LINEAR	·	4.9 km	MPC · JPL
26557 Aakritijain	2000 DS_{107}	Aakritijain	February 28, 2000	Socorro	LINEAR	·	3.2 km	MPC · JPL
26558	2000 EA_{12}	—	March 4, 2000	Socorro	LINEAR	·	9.9 km	MPC · JPL
26559 Chengcheng	2000 EX_{29}	Chengcheng	March 5, 2000	Socorro	LINEAR	V	2.1 km	MPC · JPL
26560	2000 EQ_{36}	—	March 8, 2000	Socorro	LINEAR	·	5.9 km	MPC · JPL
26561	2000 EV_{37}	—	March 8, 2000	Socorro	LINEAR	CYB	10 km	MPC · JPL
26562	2000 EB_{38}	—	March 8, 2000	Socorro	LINEAR	ADE	8.5 km	MPC · JPL
26563	2000 EG_{39}	—	March 8, 2000	Socorro	LINEAR	·	14 km	MPC · JPL
26564	2000 EC_{46}	—	March 9, 2000	Socorro	LINEAR	MAR	4.2 km	MPC · JPL
26565	2000 EF_{47}	—	March 9, 2000	Socorro	LINEAR	·	14 km	MPC · JPL
26566	2000 EH_{47}	—	March 9, 2000	Socorro	LINEAR	EOS	7.9 km	MPC · JPL
26567	2000 EC_{48}	—	March 9, 2000	Socorro	LINEAR	·	4.9 km	MPC · JPL
26568	2000 ET_{49}	—	March 9, 2000	Socorro	LINEAR	·	17 km	MPC · JPL
26569	2000 EL_{77}	—	March 5, 2000	Socorro	LINEAR	PHO	7.6 km	MPC · JPL
26570	2000 EU_{77}	—	March 5, 2000	Socorro	LINEAR	HYG	13 km	MPC · JPL
26571	2000 EN_{84}	—	March 7, 2000	Socorro	LINEAR	·	10 km	MPC · JPL
26572	2000 EP_{84}	—	March 8, 2000	Socorro	LINEAR	EMA	12 km	MPC · JPL
26573	2000 EG_{87}	—	March 8, 2000	Socorro	LINEAR	V	4.2 km	MPC · JPL
26574	2000 ER_{87}	—	March 8, 2000	Socorro	LINEAR	·	8.8 km	MPC · JPL
26575 Andreapugh	2000 ES_{89}	Andreapugh	March 9, 2000	Socorro	LINEAR	NYS	2.8 km	MPC · JPL
26576	2000 EN_{90}	—	March 9, 2000	Socorro	LINEAR	EOS	6.9 km	MPC · JPL
26577	2000 EC_{91}	—	March 9, 2000	Socorro	LINEAR	EOS	7.6 km	MPC · JPL
26578 Cellinekim	2000 EH_{92}	Cellinekim	March 9, 2000	Socorro	LINEAR	EOS	5.8 km	MPC · JPL
26579	2000 EU_{96}	—	March 10, 2000	Socorro	LINEAR	·	9.8 km	MPC · JPL
26580	2000 EW_{97}	—	March 12, 2000	Socorro	LINEAR	EUN	5.5 km	MPC · JPL
26581	2000 EP_{107}	—	March 8, 2000	Socorro	LINEAR	·	5.9 km	MPC · JPL
26582	2000 EV_{107}	—	March 8, 2000	Socorro	LINEAR	·	5.6 km	MPC · JPL
26583	2000 EF_{109}	—	March 8, 2000	Haleakala	NEAT	·	8.5 km	MPC · JPL
26584	2000 EF_{114}	—	March 9, 2000	Socorro	LINEAR	TEL	5.7 km	MPC · JPL
26585	2000 ED_{116}	—	March 10, 2000	Kitt Peak	Spacewatch	THM	8.4 km	MPC · JPL
26586 Harshaw	2000 EF_{116}	Harshaw	March 10, 2000	Catalina	CSS	GEF	5.8 km	MPC · JPL
26587 Arthurstorbo	2000 EU_{125}	Arthurstorbo	March 11, 2000	Anderson Mesa	LONEOS	·	5.7 km	MPC · JPL
26588 Sharonstorbo	2000 EX_{128}	Sharonstorbo	March 11, 2000	Anderson Mesa	LONEOS	·	5.7 km	MPC · JPL
26589	2000 EN_{133}	—	March 11, 2000	Socorro	LINEAR	·	3.4 km	MPC · JPL
26590	2000 EY_{136}	—	March 12, 2000	Socorro	LINEAR	·	3.3 km	MPC · JPL
26591 Robertreeves	2000 ET_{141}	Robertreeves	March 2, 2000	Catalina	CSS	·	5.2 km	MPC · JPL
26592 Maryrenfro	2000 EE_{144}	Maryrenfro	March 3, 2000	Catalina	CSS	EUN	5.7 km	MPC · JPL
26593 Perrypat	2000 EC_{145}	Perrypat	March 3, 2000	Catalina	CSS	EOS	7.1 km	MPC · JPL
26594	2000 EF_{151}	—	March 5, 2000	Haleakala	NEAT	EOS	9.4 km	MPC · JPL
26595	2000 EJ_{153}	—	March 6, 2000	Haleakala	NEAT	EOS	5.0 km	MPC · JPL
26596	2000 EE_{171}	—	March 5, 2000	Socorro	LINEAR	·	5.3 km	MPC · JPL
26597	2000 EF_{171}	—	March 5, 2000	Socorro	LINEAR	EOS	6.3 km	MPC · JPL
26598	2000 EV_{171}	—	March 5, 2000	Socorro	LINEAR	·	9.5 km	MPC · JPL
26599	2000 EZ_{171}	—	March 8, 2000	Socorro	LINEAR	·	10 km	MPC · JPL
26600	2000 EX_{182}	—	March 5, 2000	Socorro	LINEAR	·	2.1 km	MPC · JPL

== 26601–26700 ==
back to top

Designation			Discovery			Properties		Ref
Permanent	Provisional	Named after	Date	Site	Discoverer(s)	Category	Diam.	Ref
26601	2000 FD_{1}	—	March 26, 2000	Socorro	LINEAR	L4	25 km	MPC · JPL
26602	2000 FQ_{11}	—	March 28, 2000	Socorro	LINEAR	·	5.1 km	MPC · JPL
26603	2000 FT_{17}	—	March 29, 2000	Socorro	LINEAR	EOS	9.6 km	MPC · JPL
26604 Ensign	2000 FO_{25}	Ensign	March 27, 2000	Anderson Mesa	LONEOS	·	7.0 km	MPC · JPL
26605 Hanley	2000 FS_{26}	Hanley	March 27, 2000	Anderson Mesa	LONEOS	·	5.5 km	MPC · JPL
26606	2000 FH_{31}	—	March 28, 2000	Socorro	LINEAR	EOS	6.5 km	MPC · JPL
26607	2000 FA_{33}	—	March 29, 2000	Socorro	LINEAR	CYB	20 km	MPC · JPL
26608	2000 FZ_{33}	—	March 29, 2000	Socorro	LINEAR	·	7.8 km	MPC · JPL
26609	2000 FQ_{34}	—	March 29, 2000	Socorro	LINEAR	HYG	9.7 km	MPC · JPL
26610	2000 FK_{39}	—	March 29, 2000	Socorro	LINEAR	·	16 km	MPC · JPL
26611 Madzlandon	2000 FT_{41}	Madzlandon	March 29, 2000	Socorro	LINEAR	·	3.7 km	MPC · JPL
26612 Sunsetastro	2000 FL_{55}	Sunsetastro	March 30, 2000	Catalina	CSS	EUN	3.7 km	MPC · JPL
26613 Brettwhite	2000 GL_{2}	Brettwhite	April 3, 2000	Reedy Creek	J. Broughton	EOS	6.9 km	MPC · JPL
26614	2000 GD_{4}	—	April 5, 2000	Fountain Hills	C. W. Juels	THM	9.9 km	MPC · JPL
26615	2000 GV_{5}	—	April 4, 2000	Socorro	LINEAR	·	6.9 km	MPC · JPL
26616	2000 GG_{6}	—	April 4, 2000	Socorro	LINEAR	ADE	11 km	MPC · JPL
26617	2000 GV_{9}	—	April 5, 2000	Socorro	LINEAR	·	2.9 km	MPC · JPL
26618 Yixinli	2000 GX_{24}	Yixinli	April 5, 2000	Socorro	LINEAR	·	7.3 km	MPC · JPL
26619	2000 GP_{44}	—	April 5, 2000	Socorro	LINEAR	KOR	5.5 km	MPC · JPL
26620 Yihuali	2000 GQ_{45}	Yihuali	April 5, 2000	Socorro	LINEAR	·	5.5 km	MPC · JPL
26621	2000 GY_{57}	—	April 5, 2000	Socorro	LINEAR	·	9.9 km	MPC · JPL
26622 Maxwimberley	2000 GH_{75}	Maxwimberley	April 5, 2000	Socorro	LINEAR	·	2.7 km	MPC · JPL
26623	2000 GK_{82}	—	April 8, 2000	Farpoint	Farpoint	·	13 km	MPC · JPL
26624	2000 GX_{88}	—	April 4, 2000	Socorro	LINEAR	V	3.8 km	MPC · JPL
26625	2000 GY_{92}	—	April 5, 2000	Socorro	LINEAR	HYG	11 km	MPC · JPL
26626	2000 GZ_{96}	—	April 6, 2000	Socorro	LINEAR	EUN	4.3 km	MPC · JPL
26627	2000 GC_{99}	—	April 7, 2000	Socorro	LINEAR	EUN	6.8 km	MPC · JPL
26628	2000 GX_{114}	—	April 7, 2000	Socorro	LINEAR	EOS	12 km	MPC · JPL
26629 Zahller	2000 GZ_{132}	Zahller	April 12, 2000	USNO Flagstaff	Luginbuhl, C. B.	EUN	5.0 km	MPC · JPL
26630	2000 GH_{133}	—	April 12, 2000	Haleakala	NEAT	EUN	5.5 km	MPC · JPL
26631	2000 GE_{136}	—	April 12, 2000	Socorro	LINEAR	EOS · slow	7.4 km	MPC · JPL
26632	2000 HS_{30}	—	April 28, 2000	Socorro	LINEAR	·	7.1 km	MPC · JPL
26633	2000 HS_{47}	—	April 29, 2000	Socorro	LINEAR	THM	8.1 km	MPC · JPL
26634 Balasubramanian	2000 HX_{51}	Balasubramanian	April 29, 2000	Socorro	LINEAR	·	7.1 km	MPC · JPL
26635	2000 HC_{53}	—	April 29, 2000	Socorro	LINEAR	THM	11 km	MPC · JPL
26636 Ericabroman	2000 HX_{57}	Ericabroman	April 24, 2000	Anderson Mesa	LONEOS	EUN	7.0 km	MPC · JPL
26637	2000 HE_{82}	—	April 29, 2000	Socorro	LINEAR	·	3.6 km	MPC · JPL
26638	2000 HO_{88}	—	April 28, 2000	Socorro	LINEAR	·	4.0 km	MPC · JPL
26639 Murgaš	2000 JB_{7}	Murgaš	May 5, 2000	Ondřejov	P. Kušnirák	·	4.7 km	MPC · JPL
26640 Bahýľ	2000 JV_{10}	Bahýľ	May 9, 2000	Ondřejov	P. Kušnirák	·	4.5 km	MPC · JPL
26641	2000 JT_{30}	—	May 7, 2000	Socorro	LINEAR	VER	14 km	MPC · JPL
26642 Schlenoff	2000 JJ_{55}	Schlenoff	May 6, 2000	Socorro	LINEAR	KOR	4.0 km	MPC · JPL
26643	2000 JT_{59}	—	May 7, 2000	Socorro	LINEAR	·	7.8 km	MPC · JPL
26644	2000 JJ_{61}	—	May 7, 2000	Socorro	LINEAR	EUN	4.3 km	MPC · JPL
26645	2000 JJ_{66}	—	May 6, 2000	Socorro	LINEAR	CYB	11 km	MPC · JPL
26646	2000 KG_{67}	—	May 31, 2000	Socorro	LINEAR	·	8.6 km	MPC · JPL
26647 Brabham	2000 LT	Brabham	June 2, 2000	Reedy Creek	J. Broughton	URS	17 km	MPC · JPL
26648	2000 LY_{7}	—	June 5, 2000	Socorro	LINEAR	INA	10 km	MPC · JPL
26649	2000 ML_{6}	—	June 30, 2000	Haleakala	NEAT	·	16 km	MPC · JPL
26650	2000 OY_{20}	—	July 31, 2000	Socorro	LINEAR	·	3.1 km	MPC · JPL
26651	2000 OB_{45}	—	July 30, 2000	Socorro	LINEAR	PHO	4.5 km	MPC · JPL
26652 Klinglesmith	2000 QH_{219}	Klinglesmith	August 20, 2000	Anderson Mesa	LONEOS	·	5.0 km	MPC · JPL
26653 Amymeyer	2000 RY_{52}	Amymeyer	September 4, 2000	Socorro	LINEAR	·	2.7 km	MPC · JPL
26654 Ericjohnson	2000 RH_{103}	Ericjohnson	September 5, 2000	Anderson Mesa	LONEOS	EUN	4.6 km	MPC · JPL
26655	2000 SV_{87}	—	September 24, 2000	Socorro	LINEAR	·	5.1 km	MPC · JPL
26656 Samarenae	2000 SN_{160}	Samarenae	September 27, 2000	Socorro	LINEAR	·	3.1 km	MPC · JPL
26657	2000 SX_{293}	—	September 27, 2000	Socorro	LINEAR	·	7.0 km	MPC · JPL
26658	2000 UN_{90}	—	October 24, 2000	Socorro	LINEAR	·	6.3 km	MPC · JPL
26659 Skirda	2000 VY_{29}	Skirda	November 1, 2000	Socorro	LINEAR	·	2.5 km	MPC · JPL
26660 Samahalpern	2000 VG_{33}	Samahalpern	November 1, 2000	Socorro	LINEAR	·	4.5 km	MPC · JPL
26661 Kempelen	2000 WY_{67}	Kempelen	November 27, 2000	Ondřejov	P. Kušnirák	·	2.0 km	MPC · JPL
26662	2000 WB_{181}	—	November 29, 2000	Socorro	LINEAR	·	6.2 km	MPC · JPL
26663	2000 XK_{47}	—	December 15, 2000	Socorro	LINEAR	APO +1km · PHA	840 m	MPC · JPL
26664 Jongwon	2000 YB_{7}	Jongwon	December 20, 2000	Socorro	LINEAR	(5)	2.9 km	MPC · JPL
26665 Sidjena	2000 YF_{60}	Sidjena	December 30, 2000	Socorro	LINEAR	·	3.2 km	MPC · JPL
26666 Justinto	2000 YN_{97}	Justinto	December 30, 2000	Socorro	LINEAR	·	2.9 km	MPC · JPL
26667 Sherwinwu	2001 AS_{41}	Sherwinwu	January 3, 2001	Socorro	LINEAR	·	4.2 km	MPC · JPL
26668 Tonyho	2001 BV_{7}	Tonyho	January 19, 2001	Socorro	LINEAR	·	6.7 km	MPC · JPL
26669	2001 BW_{44}	—	January 19, 2001	Socorro	LINEAR	·	5.8 km	MPC · JPL
26670	2001 BC_{74}	—	January 30, 2001	Socorro	LINEAR	·	3.8 km	MPC · JPL
26671 Williamlopes	2001 DQ_{73}	Williamlopes	February 19, 2001	Socorro	LINEAR	·	3.7 km	MPC · JPL
26672 Ericabrooke	2001 DR_{74}	Ericabrooke	February 19, 2001	Socorro	LINEAR	·	3.2 km	MPC · JPL
26673	2001 DJ_{92}	—	February 20, 2001	Haleakala	NEAT	·	6.0 km	MPC · JPL
26674	2001 DB_{99}	—	February 17, 2001	Socorro	LINEAR	·	8.5 km	MPC · JPL
26675	2001 EZ	—	March 1, 2001	Socorro	LINEAR	·	8.7 km	MPC · JPL
26676	2001 EZ_{10}	—	March 2, 2001	Haleakala	NEAT	·	3.6 km	MPC · JPL
26677	2001 EJ_{18}	—	March 15, 2001	Socorro	LINEAR	·	1.3 km	MPC · JPL
26678 Garner	2001 EN_{19}	Garner	March 15, 2001	Anderson Mesa	LONEOS	·	13 km	MPC · JPL
26679 Thomassilver	2001 FX_{5}	Thomassilver	March 18, 2001	Socorro	LINEAR	·	3.3 km	MPC · JPL
26680 Wangchristi	2001 FL_{8}	Wangchristi	March 18, 2001	Socorro	LINEAR	RAF	3.7 km	MPC · JPL
26681 Niezgay	2001 FQ_{8}	Niezgay	March 18, 2001	Socorro	LINEAR	NYS	3.1 km	MPC · JPL
26682 Evanfletcher	2001 FV_{8}	Evanfletcher	March 19, 2001	Socorro	LINEAR	NYS	3.0 km	MPC · JPL
26683 Jamesmccarthy	2001 FM_{22}	Jamesmccarthy	March 21, 2001	Anderson Mesa	LONEOS	EUN	3.3 km	MPC · JPL
26684	2001 FZ_{35}	—	March 18, 2001	Socorro	LINEAR	·	1.4 km	MPC · JPL
26685 Khojandi	2001 FK_{44}	Khojandi	March 18, 2001	Socorro	LINEAR	·	6.9 km	MPC · JPL
26686 Ellenprice	2001 FT_{45}	Ellenprice	March 18, 2001	Socorro	LINEAR	NYS	2.6 km	MPC · JPL
26687	2001 FH_{54}	—	March 18, 2001	Socorro	LINEAR	EUN	5.1 km	MPC · JPL
26688 Wangenevieve	2001 FZ_{54}	Wangenevieve	March 19, 2001	Socorro	LINEAR	KOR	4.1 km	MPC · JPL
26689 Smorrison	2001 FD_{56}	Smorrison	March 23, 2001	Socorro	LINEAR	·	2.4 km	MPC · JPL
26690	2001 FS_{57}	—	March 19, 2001	Socorro	LINEAR	·	2.8 km	MPC · JPL
26691 Lareegardner	2001 FZ_{76}	Lareegardner	March 19, 2001	Socorro	LINEAR	·	2.1 km	MPC · JPL
26692	2001 FM_{80}	—	March 21, 2001	Socorro	LINEAR	·	6.2 km	MPC · JPL
26693 Katharinecorbin	2001 FP_{87}	Katharinecorbin	March 21, 2001	Anderson Mesa	LONEOS	·	1.4 km	MPC · JPL
26694 Wenxili	2001 FR_{98}	Wenxili	March 16, 2001	Socorro	LINEAR	·	4.0 km	MPC · JPL
26695	2001 FC_{111}	—	March 18, 2001	Socorro	LINEAR	LIX ·	6.6 km	MPC · JPL
26696 Gechenzhang	2001 FE_{112}	Gechenzhang	March 18, 2001	Socorro	LINEAR	·	2.0 km	MPC · JPL
26697	2001 FJ_{127}	—	March 29, 2001	Socorro	LINEAR	GEF	4.3 km	MPC · JPL
26698 Maryschroeder	2001 FN_{128}	Maryschroeder	March 31, 2001	Anderson Mesa	LONEOS	·	2.9 km	MPC · JPL
26699 Masoncole	2001 FZ_{128}	Masoncole	March 30, 2001	Socorro	LINEAR	·	3.1 km	MPC · JPL
26700	2001 FD_{134}	—	March 20, 2001	Haleakala	NEAT	EOS	6.7 km	MPC · JPL

== 26701–26800 ==
back to top

Designation			Discovery			Properties		Ref
Permanent	Provisional	Named after	Date	Site	Discoverer(s)	Category	Diam.	Ref
26701	2001 FH_{134}	—	March 20, 2001	Haleakala	NEAT	EOS	4.8 km	MPC · JPL
26702 Naber	2001 FK_{143}	Naber	March 23, 2001	Anderson Mesa	LONEOS	·	12 km	MPC · JPL
26703 Price	2001 FB_{144}	Price	March 23, 2001	Anderson Mesa	LONEOS	·	2.8 km	MPC · JPL
26704	2001 FW_{144}	—	March 23, 2001	Kitt Peak	Spacewatch	·	3.2 km	MPC · JPL
26705	2001 FL_{145}	—	March 24, 2001	Anderson Mesa	LONEOS	L4	21 km	MPC · JPL
26706	2001 FA_{154}	—	March 26, 2001	Kitt Peak	Spacewatch	EUN	4.7 km	MPC · JPL
26707 Navrazhnykh	2001 FP_{155}	Navrazhnykh	March 26, 2001	Socorro	LINEAR	·	3.2 km	MPC · JPL
26708	2001 FG_{158}	—	March 27, 2001	Haleakala	NEAT	·	1.6 km	MPC · JPL
26709	2001 FX_{158}	—	March 28, 2001	Socorro	LINEAR	ADE	8.0 km	MPC · JPL
26710	2001 FY_{158}	—	March 28, 2001	Socorro	LINEAR	·	3.8 km	MPC · JPL
26711 Rebekahbau	2001 FQ_{170}	Rebekahbau	March 24, 2001	Socorro	LINEAR	EOS	5.7 km	MPC · JPL
26712 Stewart	2001 FV_{180}	Stewart	March 20, 2001	Anderson Mesa	LONEOS	MAS	1.7 km	MPC · JPL
26713 Iusukyin	2001 GR	Iusukyin	April 13, 2001	Desert Beaver	W. K. Y. Yeung	EOS	5.6 km	MPC · JPL
26714	2001 GL_{1}	—	April 13, 2001	Socorro	LINEAR	H	1.6 km	MPC · JPL
26715 South Dakota	2001 HJ	South Dakota	April 16, 2001	Badlands	Dyvig, R.	·	4.3 km	MPC · JPL
26716	2001 HZ_{3}	—	April 18, 2001	Reedy Creek	J. Broughton	·	2.4 km	MPC · JPL
26717 Jasonye	2001 HL_{5}	Jasonye	April 18, 2001	Socorro	LINEAR	·	2.9 km	MPC · JPL
26718	2001 HP_{5}	—	April 18, 2001	Socorro	LINEAR	·	23 km	MPC · JPL
26719	2001 HQ_{5}	—	April 18, 2001	Socorro	LINEAR	HYG	12 km	MPC · JPL
26720 Yangxinyan	2001 HB_{6}	Yangxinyan	April 18, 2001	Socorro	LINEAR	·	2.7 km	MPC · JPL
26721	2001 HG_{6}	—	April 18, 2001	Socorro	LINEAR	·	3.3 km	MPC · JPL
26722	2001 HK_{7}	—	April 21, 2001	Socorro	LINEAR	·	16 km	MPC · JPL
26723	2001 HE_{8}	—	April 18, 2001	Kitt Peak	Spacewatch	·	2.3 km	MPC · JPL
26724	2001 HU_{8}	—	April 16, 2001	Socorro	LINEAR	TIR · fast ·	8.8 km	MPC · JPL
26725	2001 HH_{9}	—	April 16, 2001	Socorro	LINEAR	·	13 km	MPC · JPL
26726	2001 HD_{10}	—	April 16, 2001	Socorro	LINEAR	·	2.9 km	MPC · JPL
26727 Wujunjun	2001 HK_{10}	Wujunjun	April 16, 2001	Socorro	LINEAR	KON	7.1 km	MPC · JPL
26728 Luwenqi	2001 HM_{10}	Luwenqi	April 16, 2001	Socorro	LINEAR	·	3.1 km	MPC · JPL
26729	2001 HE_{12}	—	April 18, 2001	Socorro	LINEAR	GEF	6.5 km	MPC · JPL
26730	2001 HJ_{13}	—	April 18, 2001	Socorro	LINEAR	·	5.4 km	MPC · JPL
26731	2001 HE_{14}	—	April 23, 2001	Reedy Creek	J. Broughton	·	6.9 km	MPC · JPL
26732 Damianpeach	2001 HB_{16}	Damianpeach	April 22, 2001	Desert Beaver	W. K. Y. Yeung	·	2.6 km	MPC · JPL
26733 Nanavisitor	2001 HC_{16}	Nanavisitor	April 22, 2001	Desert Beaver	W. K. Y. Yeung	·	2.7 km	MPC · JPL
26734 Terryfarrell	2001 HG_{16}	Terryfarrell	April 23, 2001	Desert Beaver	W. K. Y. Yeung	·	3.1 km	MPC · JPL
26735	2001 HL_{27}	—	April 27, 2001	Socorro	LINEAR	EOS	6.6 km	MPC · JPL
26736 Rojeski	2001 HM_{27}	Rojeski	April 27, 2001	Socorro	LINEAR	V	1.7 km	MPC · JPL
26737 Adambradley	2001 HQ_{28}	Adambradley	April 27, 2001	Socorro	LINEAR	(2076)	3.6 km	MPC · JPL
26738 Lishizhen	2001 HB_{32}	Lishizhen	April 28, 2001	Desert Beaver	W. K. Y. Yeung	·	2.4 km	MPC · JPL
26739 Hemaeberhart	2001 HV_{32}	Hemaeberhart	April 23, 2001	Socorro	LINEAR	·	1.9 km	MPC · JPL
26740 Camacho	2001 HN_{34}	Camacho	April 27, 2001	Socorro	LINEAR	THM	6.6 km	MPC · JPL
26741	2001 HZ_{35}	—	April 29, 2001	Socorro	LINEAR	V	2.3 km	MPC · JPL
26742	2001 HW_{36}	—	April 29, 2001	Socorro	LINEAR	·	2.6 km	MPC · JPL
26743 Laichinglung	2001 HE_{38}	Laichinglung	April 30, 2001	Desert Beaver	W. K. Y. Yeung	EOS	6.9 km	MPC · JPL
26744 Marthahaynes	2001 HF_{43}	Marthahaynes	April 16, 2001	Anderson Mesa	LONEOS	·	2.5 km	MPC · JPL
26745 Szeglin	2001 HV_{45}	Szeglin	April 17, 2001	Anderson Mesa	LONEOS	GEF	4.4 km	MPC · JPL
26746	2001 HW_{46}	—	April 18, 2001	Socorro	LINEAR	·	8.5 km	MPC · JPL
26747	2001 HC_{47}	—	April 18, 2001	Socorro	LINEAR	·	3.8 km	MPC · JPL
26748 Targovnik	2001 HP_{50}	Targovnik	April 23, 2001	Anderson Mesa	LONEOS	·	2.4 km	MPC · JPL
26749	2001 HT_{52}	—	April 23, 2001	Socorro	LINEAR	·	3.1 km	MPC · JPL
26750	2001 HJ_{55}	—	April 24, 2001	Socorro	LINEAR	·	5.0 km	MPC · JPL
26751	2001 HP_{64}	—	April 27, 2001	Haleakala	NEAT	·	1.9 km	MPC · JPL
26752	2001 HU_{65}	—	April 30, 2001	Socorro	LINEAR	EOS	5.1 km	MPC · JPL
26753	2001 HM_{66}	—	April 24, 2001	Socorro	LINEAR	PHO	2.7 km	MPC · JPL
26754	2001 JL_{4}	—	May 15, 2001	Palomar	NEAT	PHO	3.4 km	MPC · JPL
26755	2001 KT_{6}	—	May 17, 2001	Socorro	LINEAR	CYB	10 km	MPC · JPL
26756	2001 KW_{7}	—	May 18, 2001	Socorro	LINEAR	·	3.5 km	MPC · JPL
26757 Bastei	2001 KU_{17}	Bastei	May 20, 2001	Drebach	Drebach	·	6.1 km	MPC · JPL
26758	2001 KV_{19}	—	May 22, 2001	Socorro	LINEAR	·	8.7 km	MPC · JPL
26759	2001 KS_{22}	—	May 17, 2001	Socorro	LINEAR	·	3.5 km	MPC · JPL
26760	2001 KP_{41}	—	May 23, 2001	Socorro	LINEAR	AMO +1km	5.4 km	MPC · JPL
26761 Stromboli	2033 P-L	Stromboli	September 24, 1960	Palomar	C. J. van Houten, I. van Houten-Groeneveld, T. Gehrels	3:2	17 km	MPC · JPL
26762	2564 P-L	—	September 24, 1960	Palomar	C. J. van Houten, I. van Houten-Groeneveld, T. Gehrels	·	3.9 km	MPC · JPL
26763 Peirithoos	2706 P-L	Peirithoos	September 24, 1960	Palomar	C. J. van Houten, I. van Houten-Groeneveld, T. Gehrels	L4	12 km	MPC · JPL
26764	2800 P-L	—	September 24, 1960	Palomar	C. J. van Houten, I. van Houten-Groeneveld, T. Gehrels	·	2.8 km	MPC · JPL
26765	3038 P-L	—	September 24, 1960	Palomar	C. J. van Houten, I. van Houten-Groeneveld, T. Gehrels	·	2.6 km	MPC · JPL
26766	3052 P-L	—	September 24, 1960	Palomar	C. J. van Houten, I. van Houten-Groeneveld, T. Gehrels	EOS	6.0 km	MPC · JPL
26767	4084 P-L	—	September 24, 1960	Palomar	C. J. van Houten, I. van Houten-Groeneveld, T. Gehrels	·	3.3 km	MPC · JPL
26768	4608 P-L	—	September 24, 1960	Palomar	C. J. van Houten, I. van Houten-Groeneveld, T. Gehrels	EOS	5.5 km	MPC · JPL
26769	4658 P-L	—	September 24, 1960	Palomar	C. J. van Houten, I. van Houten-Groeneveld, T. Gehrels	·	7.4 km	MPC · JPL
26770	4734 P-L	—	September 24, 1960	Palomar	C. J. van Houten, I. van Houten-Groeneveld, T. Gehrels	·	1.9 km	MPC · JPL
26771	4846 P-L	—	September 24, 1960	Palomar	C. J. van Houten, I. van Houten-Groeneveld, T. Gehrels	·	6.7 km	MPC · JPL
26772	6033 P-L	—	September 24, 1960	Palomar	C. J. van Houten, I. van Houten-Groeneveld, T. Gehrels	·	2.3 km	MPC · JPL
26773	3254 T-1	—	March 26, 1971	Palomar	C. J. van Houten, I. van Houten-Groeneveld, T. Gehrels	·	3.8 km	MPC · JPL
26774	4189 T-1	—	March 26, 1971	Palomar	C. J. van Houten, I. van Houten-Groeneveld, T. Gehrels	·	1.5 km	MPC · JPL
26775	4205 T-1	—	March 26, 1971	Palomar	C. J. van Houten, I. van Houten-Groeneveld, T. Gehrels	EUN	5.2 km	MPC · JPL
26776	4236 T-1	—	March 26, 1971	Palomar	C. J. van Houten, I. van Houten-Groeneveld, T. Gehrels	·	9.3 km	MPC · JPL
26777	1225 T-2	—	September 29, 1973	Palomar	C. J. van Houten, I. van Houten-Groeneveld, T. Gehrels	(5)	2.6 km	MPC · JPL
26778	1354 T-2	—	September 29, 1973	Palomar	C. J. van Houten, I. van Houten-Groeneveld, T. Gehrels	·	5.8 km	MPC · JPL
26779	2191 T-2	—	September 29, 1973	Palomar	C. J. van Houten, I. van Houten-Groeneveld, T. Gehrels	·	1.6 km	MPC · JPL
26780	2313 T-2	—	September 29, 1973	Palomar	C. J. van Houten, I. van Houten-Groeneveld, T. Gehrels	·	3.7 km	MPC · JPL
26781	3182 T-2	—	September 30, 1973	Palomar	C. J. van Houten, I. van Houten-Groeneveld, T. Gehrels	·	3.1 km	MPC · JPL
26782	4174 T-2	—	September 29, 1973	Palomar	C. J. van Houten, I. van Houten-Groeneveld, T. Gehrels	KOR	3.2 km	MPC · JPL
26783	1085 T-3	—	October 17, 1977	Palomar	C. J. van Houten, I. van Houten-Groeneveld, T. Gehrels	V	3.0 km	MPC · JPL
26784	2103 T-3	—	October 16, 1977	Palomar	C. J. van Houten, I. van Houten-Groeneveld, T. Gehrels	EOS	6.4 km	MPC · JPL
26785	2496 T-3	—	October 16, 1977	Palomar	C. J. van Houten, I. van Houten-Groeneveld, T. Gehrels	EOS	5.9 km	MPC · JPL
26786	3382 T-3	—	October 16, 1977	Palomar	C. J. van Houten, I. van Houten-Groeneveld, T. Gehrels	V	2.6 km	MPC · JPL
26787	4265 T-3	—	October 16, 1977	Palomar	C. J. van Houten, I. van Houten-Groeneveld, T. Gehrels	·	7.3 km	MPC · JPL
26788	4321 T-3	—	October 16, 1977	Palomar	C. J. van Houten, I. van Houten-Groeneveld, T. Gehrels	V	1.5 km	MPC · JPL
26789	5092 T-3	—	October 16, 1977	Palomar	C. J. van Houten, I. van Houten-Groeneveld, T. Gehrels	·	11 km	MPC · JPL
26790	5235 T-3	—	October 17, 1977	Palomar	C. J. van Houten, I. van Houten-Groeneveld, T. Gehrels	·	3.3 km	MPC · JPL
26791	5282 T-3	—	October 17, 1977	Palomar	C. J. van Houten, I. van Houten-Groeneveld, T. Gehrels	EUN · slow	4.5 km	MPC · JPL
26792 Pintado	1975 LY	Pintado	June 8, 1975	El Leoncito	Cesco, M. R.	MAR	6.7 km	MPC · JPL
26793 Bolshoi	1977 AC_{2}	Bolshoi	January 13, 1977	Nauchnij	N. S. Chernykh	EUN	7.7 km	MPC · JPL
26794 Yukioniimi	1977 DG_{3}	Yukioniimi	February 18, 1977	Kiso	H. Kosai, K. Furukawa	·	5.1 km	MPC · JPL
26795 Basilashvili	1978 SD_{8}	Basilashvili	September 26, 1978	Nauchnij	L. V. Zhuravleva	·	2.7 km	MPC · JPL
26796	1978 VO_{6}	—	November 7, 1978	Palomar	E. F. Helin, S. J. Bus	·	2.8 km	MPC · JPL
26797	1978 VS_{8}	—	November 7, 1978	Palomar	E. F. Helin, S. J. Bus	·	3.5 km	MPC · JPL
26798	1979 QG_{2}	—	August 22, 1979	La Silla	C.-I. Lagerkvist	NYS	2.4 km	MPC · JPL
26799	1979 XL	—	December 15, 1979	La Silla	H. Debehogne, Netto, E. R.	GEF	4.8 km	MPC · JPL
26800 Gualtierotrucco	1981 EK_{1}	Gualtierotrucco	March 6, 1981	La Silla	H. Debehogne, G. de Sanctis	·	5.3 km	MPC · JPL

== 26801–26900 ==
back to top

Designation			Discovery			Properties		Ref
Permanent	Provisional	Named after	Date	Site	Discoverer(s)	Category	Diam.	Ref
26801	1981 EC_{14}	—	March 1, 1981	Siding Spring	S. J. Bus	·	3.1 km	MPC · JPL
26802	1981 EJ_{24}	—	March 7, 1981	Siding Spring	S. J. Bus	V	1.8 km	MPC · JPL
26803	1981 ES_{26}	—	March 2, 1981	Siding Spring	S. J. Bus	·	3.4 km	MPC · JPL
26804	1981 EZ_{29}	—	March 2, 1981	Siding Spring	S. J. Bus	·	1.7 km	MPC · JPL
26805	1981 EZ_{30}	—	March 2, 1981	Siding Spring	S. J. Bus	AGN	3.4 km	MPC · JPL
26806 Kushiike	1982 KX_{1}	Kushiike	May 22, 1982	Kiso	H. Kosai, K. Furukawa	slow	12 km	MPC · JPL
26807	1982 RK_{1}	—	September 14, 1982	Kleť	A. Mrkos	SUL	11 km	MPC · JPL
26808 Takeoroumon	1982 VB_{4}	Takeoroumon	November 14, 1982	Kiso	H. Kosai, K. Furukawa	·	4.4 km	MPC · JPL
26809	1984 QU	—	August 24, 1984	Harvard Observatory	Oak Ridge Observatory	·	2.0 km	MPC · JPL
26810	1985 CL_{2}	—	February 14, 1985	La Silla	H. Debehogne	MAS	3.1 km	MPC · JPL
26811 Hiesinger	1985 QP	Hiesinger	August 22, 1985	Anderson Mesa	E. Bowell	·	2.5 km	MPC · JPL
26812	1985 RQ_{2}	—	September 4, 1985	La Silla	H. Debehogne	·	2.6 km	MPC · JPL
26813	1985 RN_{3}	—	September 7, 1985	La Silla	H. Debehogne	·	2.6 km	MPC · JPL
26814	1986 GZ	—	April 9, 1986	Kitt Peak	Spacewatch	PHO	2.2 km	MPC · JPL
26815	1986 QR_{1}	—	August 27, 1986	La Silla	H. Debehogne	·	5.5 km	MPC · JPL
26816	1986 TS	—	October 4, 1986	Brorfelde	P. Jensen	·	10 km	MPC · JPL
26817	1987 QB	—	August 25, 1987	Palomar	S. Singer-Brewster	AMO +1km	1.2 km	MPC · JPL
26818	1987 QM	—	August 25, 1987	Palomar	S. Singer-Brewster	·	7.7 km	MPC · JPL
26819	1987 QH_{7}	—	August 23, 1987	Palomar	E. F. Helin	·	3.6 km	MPC · JPL
26820	1987 SR_{9}	—	September 20, 1987	Smolyan	E. W. Elst	·	2.9 km	MPC · JPL
26821 Baehr	1988 FM_{1}	Baehr	March 17, 1988	Tautenburg Observatory	F. Börngen	EOS	16 km	MPC · JPL
26822	1988 RG_{13}	—	September 14, 1988	Cerro Tololo	S. J. Bus	·	2.6 km	MPC · JPL
26823	1988 SS_{2}	—	September 16, 1988	Cerro Tololo	S. J. Bus	·	2.1 km	MPC · JPL
26824	1988 TW_{1}	—	October 13, 1988	Kushiro	S. Ueda, H. Kaneda	·	5.0 km	MPC · JPL
26825	1989 SB_{14}	—	September 26, 1989	Calar Alto	J. M. Baur, K. Birkle	EUN	3.4 km	MPC · JPL
26826	1989 TQ_{7}	—	October 7, 1989	La Silla	E. W. Elst	·	4.2 km	MPC · JPL
26827	1989 UW_{5}	—	October 30, 1989	Cerro Tololo	S. J. Bus	(5)	4.0 km	MPC · JPL
26828 Narusawa	1989 WZ_{1}	Narusawa	November 29, 1989	Kitami	K. Endate, K. Watanabe	NYS	5.5 km	MPC · JPL
26829 Sakaihoikuen	1989 WN_{2}	Sakaihoikuen	November 30, 1989	Yatsugatake	Y. Kushida, Inoue, M.	EUN	5.1 km	MPC · JPL
26830	1990 BB	—	January 17, 1990	Toyota	K. Suzuki, T. Urata	·	9.1 km	MPC · JPL
26831	1990 OC_{5}	—	July 27, 1990	Palomar	H. E. Holt	·	7.1 km	MPC · JPL
26832	1990 QT_{6}	—	August 20, 1990	La Silla	E. W. Elst	·	4.3 km	MPC · JPL
26833	1990 RE	—	September 14, 1990	Palomar	H. E. Holt	·	11 km	MPC · JPL
26834	1990 RM_{9}	—	September 14, 1990	Palomar	H. E. Holt	·	6.0 km	MPC · JPL
26835	1990 SH_{13}	—	September 23, 1990	La Silla	H. Debehogne	·	3.4 km	MPC · JPL
26836	1991 PA_{6}	—	August 6, 1991	La Silla	E. W. Elst	·	3.9 km	MPC · JPL
26837 Yoshitakaokazaki	1991 RF_{1}	Yoshitakaokazaki	September 7, 1991	Geisei	T. Seki	·	2.4 km	MPC · JPL
26838	1991 RC_{9}	—	September 11, 1991	Palomar	H. E. Holt	·	4.0 km	MPC · JPL
26839	1991 RC_{10}	—	September 12, 1991	Palomar	H. E. Holt	EOS	7.1 km	MPC · JPL
26840	1991 RP_{12}	—	September 4, 1991	La Silla	E. W. Elst	·	3.2 km	MPC · JPL
26841	1991 TY_{1}	—	October 10, 1991	Palomar	J. Alu	·	5.7 km	MPC · JPL
26842 Hefele	1991 TK_{6}	Hefele	October 2, 1991	Tautenburg Observatory	L. D. Schmadel, F. Börngen	·	5.4 km	MPC · JPL
26843	1991 UK_{1}	—	October 28, 1991	Kushiro	S. Ueda, H. Kaneda	·	2.5 km	MPC · JPL
26844	1991 VA_{4}	—	November 12, 1991	Kiyosato	S. Otomo	·	3.0 km	MPC · JPL
26845	1992 AG	—	January 1, 1992	Okutama	Hioki, T., Hayakawa, S.	PHO	5.2 km	MPC · JPL
26846	1992 CG_{3}	—	February 2, 1992	La Silla	E. W. Elst	V	3.7 km	MPC · JPL
26847	1992 DG	—	February 25, 1992	Kushiro	S. Ueda, H. Kaneda	·	11 km	MPC · JPL
26848	1992 DB_{8}	—	February 29, 1992	La Silla	UESAC	·	3.2 km	MPC · JPL
26849 De Paepe	1992 HD_{4}	De Paepe	April 23, 1992	La Silla	E. W. Elst	RAF	4.8 km	MPC · JPL
26850	1992 JL	—	May 1, 1992	Palomar	K. J. Lawrence, Rose, P.	EUN	7.6 km	MPC · JPL
26851 Sarapul	1992 OV_{5}	Sarapul	July 30, 1992	La Silla	E. W. Elst	·	6.0 km	MPC · JPL
26852 Miyamototakashi	1992 UK_{2}	Miyamototakashi	October 19, 1992	Kitami	K. Endate, K. Watanabe	·	3.7 km	MPC · JPL
26853	1992 UQ_{2}	—	October 20, 1992	Palomar	H. E. Holt	PHO	6.2 km	MPC · JPL
26854	1992 WB	—	November 16, 1992	Kushiro	S. Ueda, H. Kaneda	·	10 km	MPC · JPL
26855 Yasukohasegawa	1992 WN_{1}	Yasukohasegawa	November 17, 1992	Kitami	K. Endate, K. Watanabe	·	9.2 km	MPC · JPL
26856	1993 BT_{14}	—	January 23, 1993	La Silla	E. W. Elst	·	6.0 km	MPC · JPL
26857 Veracruz	1993 DN_{1}	Veracruz	February 19, 1993	Haute Provence	E. W. Elst	·	4.2 km	MPC · JPL
26858 Misterrogers	1993 FR	Misterrogers	March 21, 1993	Palomar	E. F. Helin	·	6.3 km	MPC · JPL
26859	1993 FM_{8}	—	March 17, 1993	La Silla	UESAC	·	2.9 km	MPC · JPL
26860	1993 FX_{16}	—	March 19, 1993	La Silla	UESAC	V	1.8 km	MPC · JPL
26861	1993 FO_{20}	—	March 19, 1993	La Silla	UESAC	·	2.8 km	MPC · JPL
26862	1993 FE_{22}	—	March 21, 1993	La Silla	UESAC	MAS	1.6 km	MPC · JPL
26863	1993 FO_{22}	—	March 21, 1993	La Silla	UESAC	·	7.5 km	MPC · JPL
26864	1993 FT_{24}	—	March 21, 1993	La Silla	UESAC	·	6.4 km	MPC · JPL
26865	1993 FX_{29}	—	March 21, 1993	La Silla	UESAC	·	2.4 km	MPC · JPL
26866	1993 FW_{41}	—	March 19, 1993	La Silla	UESAC	·	2.8 km	MPC · JPL
26867	1993 GK_{1}	—	April 12, 1993	La Silla	H. Debehogne	·	3.6 km	MPC · JPL
26868	1993 RS_{3}	—	September 12, 1993	Palomar	PCAS	·	5.8 km	MPC · JPL
26869	1993 SR_{6}	—	September 17, 1993	La Silla	E. W. Elst	·	4.5 km	MPC · JPL
26870	1993 TP_{28}	—	October 9, 1993	La Silla	E. W. Elst	·	3.9 km	MPC · JPL
26871 Tanezrouft	1993 TB_{38}	Tanezrouft	October 9, 1993	La Silla	E. W. Elst	·	9.7 km	MPC · JPL
26872	1993 YR	—	December 18, 1993	Nachi-Katsuura	Y. Shimizu, T. Urata	·	2.4 km	MPC · JPL
26873	1994 AP_{7}	—	January 7, 1994	Kitt Peak	Spacewatch	KOR	4.3 km	MPC · JPL
26874	1994 AN_{9}	—	January 8, 1994	Kitt Peak	Spacewatch	·	13 km	MPC · JPL
26875	1994 AF_{10}	—	January 8, 1994	Kitt Peak	Spacewatch	KOR	4.8 km	MPC · JPL
26876	1994 CR_{14}	—	February 8, 1994	La Silla	E. W. Elst	EOS · slow	7.7 km	MPC · JPL
26877	1994 ED_{6}	—	March 9, 1994	Caussols	E. W. Elst	HYG	7.4 km	MPC · JPL
26878	1994 EY_{6}	—	March 9, 1994	Caussols	E. W. Elst	·	11 km	MPC · JPL
26879 Haines	1994 NL_{2}	Haines	July 9, 1994	Palomar	C. S. Shoemaker, E. M. Shoemaker	·	3.0 km	MPC · JPL
26880	1994 PK_{8}	—	August 10, 1994	La Silla	E. W. Elst	·	3.1 km	MPC · JPL
26881	1994 PF_{11}	—	August 10, 1994	La Silla	E. W. Elst	·	2.3 km	MPC · JPL
26882	1994 PY_{21}	—	August 12, 1994	La Silla	E. W. Elst	·	2.6 km	MPC · JPL
26883 Marcelproust	1994 PR_{22}	Marcelproust	August 12, 1994	La Silla	E. W. Elst	·	3.4 km	MPC · JPL
26884	1994 RX_{4}	—	September 5, 1994	Kitt Peak	Spacewatch	·	5.6 km	MPC · JPL
26885	1994 RN_{12}	—	September 3, 1994	Palomar	E. F. Helin	·	3.3 km	MPC · JPL
26886 Takahara	1994 TJ_{2}	Takahara	October 2, 1994	Kitami	K. Endate, K. Watanabe	·	3.0 km	MPC · JPL
26887 Tokyogiants	1994 TO_{15}	Tokyogiants	October 14, 1994	Kiso	Sato, I., H. Araki	·	5.3 km	MPC · JPL
26888	1994 XH	—	December 3, 1994	Oizumi	T. Kobayashi	·	3.1 km	MPC · JPL
26889	1995 BM_{1}	—	January 23, 1995	Oizumi	T. Kobayashi	(5)	4.0 km	MPC · JPL
26890	1995 BC_{4}	—	January 27, 1995	Nachi-Katsuura	Y. Shimizu, T. Urata	·	6.1 km	MPC · JPL
26891 Johnbutler	1995 CC_{2}	Johnbutler	February 7, 1995	Siding Spring	D. J. Asher	H	2.3 km	MPC · JPL
26892	1995 FZ_{3}	—	March 23, 1995	Kitt Peak	Spacewatch	·	5.4 km	MPC · JPL
26893	1995 FH_{15}	—	March 27, 1995	Kitt Peak	Spacewatch	AGN	4.6 km	MPC · JPL
26894	1995 KN_{1}	—	May 29, 1995	Stroncone	A. Vagnozzi	·	6.7 km	MPC · JPL
26895	1995 MC	—	June 23, 1995	Siding Spring	G. J. Garradd	·	9.7 km	MPC · JPL
26896 Josefhudec	1995 OY	Josefhudec	July 29, 1995	Ondřejov	P. Pravec	·	2.0 km	MPC · JPL
26897 Červená	1995 PJ	Červená	August 5, 1995	Ondřejov	L. Kotková	·	4.3 km	MPC · JPL
26898	1995 SK_{51}	—	September 26, 1995	Kitt Peak	Spacewatch	·	5.4 km	MPC · JPL
26899	1995 UQ_{3}	—	October 20, 1995	Oizumi	T. Kobayashi	·	3.9 km	MPC · JPL
26900	1995 WU_{5}	—	November 23, 1995	Farra d'Isonzo	Farra d'Isonzo	·	2.6 km	MPC · JPL

== 26901–27000 ==
back to top

Designation			Discovery			Properties		Ref
Permanent	Provisional	Named after	Date	Site	Discoverer(s)	Category	Diam.	Ref
26901	1995 WN_{20}	—	November 17, 1995	Kitt Peak	Spacewatch	·	1.7 km	MPC · JPL
26902	1995 YR	—	December 17, 1995	Chichibu	N. Satō, T. Urata	·	2.7 km	MPC · JPL
26903	1995 YT_{3}	—	December 20, 1995	Siding Spring	R. H. McNaught	EUN	4.9 km	MPC · JPL
26904	1995 YE_{25}	—	December 25, 1995	Haleakala	NEAT	·	2.8 km	MPC · JPL
26905	1996 BC_{1}	—	January 16, 1996	Oizumi	T. Kobayashi	·	3.2 km	MPC · JPL
26906 Rubidia	1996 BH_{4}	Rubidia	January 22, 1996	Socorro	R. Weber	·	4.1 km	MPC · JPL
26907	1996 EV	—	March 15, 1996	Haleakala	NEAT	PHO	6.4 km	MPC · JPL
26908 Lebesgue	1996 GK	Lebesgue	April 11, 1996	Prescott	P. G. Comba	·	2.1 km	MPC · JPL
26909 Lefschetz	1996 HY_{1}	Lefschetz	April 24, 1996	Prescott	P. G. Comba	slow	3.2 km	MPC · JPL
26910	1996 HU_{25}	—	April 20, 1996	La Silla	E. W. Elst	(17392)	3.4 km	MPC · JPL
26911	1996 JF_{1}	—	May 13, 1996	Haleakala	NEAT	·	3.5 km	MPC · JPL
26912	1996 JG_{1}	—	May 13, 1996	Haleakala	NEAT	EUN	5.5 km	MPC · JPL
26913	1996 JF_{2}	—	May 11, 1996	Xinglong	SCAP	EUN	3.5 km	MPC · JPL
26914	1996 KC_{1}	—	May 20, 1996	Campo Imperatore	A. Boattini, A. Di Clemente	·	3.1 km	MPC · JPL
26915	1996 LV_{1}	—	June 14, 1996	Haleakala	NEAT	EUN	5.6 km	MPC · JPL
26916	1996 RR_{2}	—	September 13, 1996	Catalina Station	C. W. Hergenrother	H	3.5 km	MPC · JPL
26917 Pianoro	1996 RF_{4}	Pianoro	September 15, 1996	Pianoro	V. Goretti	·	11 km	MPC · JPL
26918	1996 RA_{16}	—	September 13, 1996	Kitt Peak	Spacewatch	·	4.3 km	MPC · JPL
26919 Shoichimiyata	1996 RC_{24}	Shoichimiyata	September 3, 1996	Nanyo	T. Okuni	·	13 km	MPC · JPL
26920	1996 TQ_{12}	—	October 11, 1996	Haleakala	NEAT	H	1.5 km	MPC · JPL
26921 Jensallit	1996 TF_{15}	Jensallit	October 15, 1996	Southend Bradfield	Sallit, G.	THM	9.4 km	MPC · JPL
26922 Samara	1996 TD_{40}	Samara	October 8, 1996	La Silla	E. W. Elst	·	11 km	MPC · JPL
26923	1996 YZ	—	December 20, 1996	Oizumi	T. Kobayashi	NYS	3.2 km	MPC · JPL
26924 Johnharvey	1996 YZ_{2}	Johnharvey	December 30, 1996	Goodricke-Pigott	R. A. Tucker	EOS	7.1 km	MPC · JPL
26925	1997 AK_{2}	—	January 3, 1997	Oizumi	T. Kobayashi	·	7.9 km	MPC · JPL
26926	1997 AC_{9}	—	January 2, 1997	Kitt Peak	Spacewatch	·	5.6 km	MPC · JPL
26927	1997 CD_{4}	—	February 3, 1997	Haleakala	NEAT	·	3.6 km	MPC · JPL
26928	1997 CC_{17}	—	February 6, 1997	Oizumi	T. Kobayashi	·	2.4 km	MPC · JPL
26929	1997 CE_{18}	—	February 7, 1997	Kitt Peak	Spacewatch	T_{j} (2.97) · HIL · 3:2	14 km	MPC · JPL
26930	1997 CH_{20}	—	February 12, 1997	Oizumi	T. Kobayashi	·	3.0 km	MPC · JPL
26931	1997 CC_{22}	—	February 13, 1997	Oizumi	T. Kobayashi	·	2.1 km	MPC · JPL
26932	1997 EY_{2}	—	March 4, 1997	Oizumi	T. Kobayashi	·	1.9 km	MPC · JPL
26933	1997 EP_{3}	—	March 2, 1997	Kitt Peak	Spacewatch	·	1.6 km	MPC · JPL
26934 Jordancotler	1997 EV_{33}	Jordancotler	March 4, 1997	Socorro	LINEAR	·	2.7 km	MPC · JPL
26935 Vireday	1997 EE_{46}	Vireday	March 15, 1997	USNO Flagstaff	Luginbuhl, C. B.	·	1.9 km	MPC · JPL
26936	1997 EL_{47}	—	March 12, 1997	La Silla	E. W. Elst	V	2.1 km	MPC · JPL
26937 Makimiyamoto	1997 FQ_{1}	Makimiyamoto	March 31, 1997	Kuma Kogen	A. Nakamura	·	2.7 km	MPC · JPL
26938 Jackli	1997 FW_{3}	Jackli	March 31, 1997	Socorro	LINEAR	·	2.0 km	MPC · JPL
26939 Jiachengli	1997 FZ_{4}	Jiachengli	March 31, 1997	Socorro	LINEAR	V	1.7 km	MPC · JPL
26940 Quintero	1997 GC_{8}	Quintero	April 2, 1997	Socorro	LINEAR	·	3.1 km	MPC · JPL
26941	1997 GT_{11}	—	April 3, 1997	Socorro	LINEAR	·	1.7 km	MPC · JPL
26942 Nealkuhn	1997 GM_{12}	Nealkuhn	April 3, 1997	Socorro	LINEAR	·	3.8 km	MPC · JPL
26943	1997 GZ_{16}	—	April 3, 1997	Socorro	LINEAR	·	3.5 km	MPC · JPL
26944	1997 GX_{20}	—	April 6, 1997	Socorro	LINEAR	·	2.0 km	MPC · JPL
26945 Sushko	1997 GE_{22}	Sushko	April 6, 1997	Socorro	LINEAR	·	3.4 km	MPC · JPL
26946 Ziziyu	1997 GG_{23}	Ziziyu	April 6, 1997	Socorro	LINEAR	·	2.5 km	MPC · JPL
26947 Angelawang	1997 GF_{36}	Angelawang	April 6, 1997	Socorro	LINEAR	NYS	2.3 km	MPC · JPL
26948 Annasato	1997 GD_{38}	Annasato	April 6, 1997	Socorro	LINEAR	·	2.3 km	MPC · JPL
26949	1997 JV_{7}	—	May 3, 1997	Xinglong	SCAP	·	3.0 km	MPC · JPL
26950 Legendre	1997 JH_{10}	Legendre	May 11, 1997	Prescott	P. G. Comba	·	2.1 km	MPC · JPL
26951	1997 JZ_{15}	—	May 3, 1997	La Silla	E. W. Elst	V	1.7 km	MPC · JPL
26952	1997 JF_{16}	—	May 3, 1997	La Silla	E. W. Elst	·	4.0 km	MPC · JPL
26953	1997 KO_{2}	—	May 29, 1997	Kitt Peak	Spacewatch	·	2.5 km	MPC · JPL
26954 Skadiang	1997 MG	Skadiang	June 25, 1997	Campo Imperatore	A. Boattini	·	4.2 km	MPC · JPL
26955 Lie	1997 MR_{1}	Lie	June 30, 1997	Prescott	P. G. Comba	PHO	2.9 km	MPC · JPL
26956	1997 MT_{3}	—	June 28, 1997	Socorro	LINEAR	·	3.2 km	MPC · JPL
26957	1997 MN_{4}	—	June 28, 1997	Socorro	LINEAR	·	4.5 km	MPC · JPL
26958	1997 MY_{4}	—	June 28, 1997	Socorro	LINEAR	NYS	4.1 km	MPC · JPL
26959	1997 MR_{8}	—	June 30, 1997	Kitt Peak	Spacewatch	·	8.1 km	MPC · JPL
26960 Liouville	1997 NE_{3}	Liouville	July 8, 1997	Prescott	P. G. Comba	·	6.8 km	MPC · JPL
26961	1997 OY_{1}	—	July 29, 1997	Bédoin	P. Antonini	·	4.2 km	MPC · JPL
26962	1997 PE_{3}	—	August 13, 1997	Kleť	Kleť	·	5.6 km	MPC · JPL
26963 Palorapavý	1997 PM_{4}	Palorapavý	August 13, 1997	Ondřejov	P. Pravec	·	3.4 km	MPC · JPL
26964 Randykamiya	1997 RO	Randykamiya	September 1, 1997	Haleakala	NEAT	·	3.6 km	MPC · JPL
26965	1997 RW_{2}	—	September 3, 1997	Majorca	Á. López J., R. Pacheco	·	4.6 km	MPC · JPL
26966	1997 RL_{3}	—	September 4, 1997	Xinglong	SCAP	·	4.5 km	MPC · JPL
26967	1997 RZ_{7}	—	September 4, 1997	Gekko	T. Kagawa, T. Urata	·	7.3 km	MPC · JPL
26968	1997 RB_{9}	—	September 10, 1997	Bergisch Gladbach	W. Bickel	(5)	10 km	MPC · JPL
26969 Biver	1997 SE	Biver	September 20, 1997	Kleť	M. Tichý, J. Tichá	·	4.7 km	MPC · JPL
26970 Eliáš	1997 SE_{2}	Eliáš	September 23, 1997	Ondřejov	P. Pravec	KOR	3.1 km	MPC · JPL
26971 Sezimovo Ústí	1997 SL_{2}	Sezimovo Ústí	September 25, 1997	Kleť	M. Tichý, Z. Moravec	·	3.0 km	MPC · JPL
26972	1997 SM_{3}	—	September 21, 1997	Church Stretton	S. P. Laurie	·	5.6 km	MPC · JPL
26973 Lála	1997 SP_{25}	Lála	September 29, 1997	Ondřejov	P. Pravec, M. Wolf	·	4.5 km	MPC · JPL
26974	1997 TJ_{19}	—	October 8, 1997	Gekko	T. Kagawa, T. Urata	·	5.3 km	MPC · JPL
26975	1997 TY_{24}	—	October 8, 1997	Uenohara	N. Kawasato	·	2.7 km	MPC · JPL
26976	1997 TF_{26}	—	October 11, 1997	Xinglong	SCAP	PAD	8.9 km	MPC · JPL
26977	1997 US_{3}	—	October 26, 1997	Oizumi	T. Kobayashi	EUN · slow	6.6 km	MPC · JPL
26978	1997 UZ_{4}	—	October 20, 1997	Xinglong	SCAP	·	8.0 km	MPC · JPL
26979	1997 UR_{9}	—	October 29, 1997	Bédoin	P. Antonini	·	6.3 km	MPC · JPL
26980	1997 UQ_{10}	—	October 29, 1997	Woomera	F. B. Zoltowski	·	3.4 km	MPC · JPL
26981	1997 UJ_{15}	—	October 25, 1997	Church Stretton	S. P. Laurie	·	2.7 km	MPC · JPL
26982	1997 UY_{21}	—	October 25, 1997	Nyukasa	M. Hirasawa, S. Suzuki	·	6.4 km	MPC · JPL
26983	1997 VA	—	November 1, 1997	Woomera	F. B. Zoltowski	(5)	3.8 km	MPC · JPL
26984 Fernand-Roland	1997 VV	Fernand-Roland	November 1, 1997	Village-Neuf	C. Demeautis, Matter, D.	·	15 km	MPC · JPL
26985	1997 VP_{3}	—	November 6, 1997	Oizumi	T. Kobayashi	·	11 km	MPC · JPL
26986 Čáslavská	1997 VC_{5}	Čáslavská	November 4, 1997	Ondřejov	L. Kotková	EOS	5.8 km	MPC · JPL
26987	1997 WP_{1}	—	November 21, 1997	Xinglong	SCAP	KOR	4.3 km	MPC · JPL
26988	1997 WT_{5}	—	November 23, 1997	Kitt Peak	Spacewatch	·	8.6 km	MPC · JPL
26989	1997 WO_{7}	—	November 19, 1997	Nachi-Katsuura	Y. Shimizu, T. Urata	EOS	8.6 km	MPC · JPL
26990 Culbertson	1997 WZ_{7}	Culbertson	November 23, 1997	Chichibu	N. Satō	EOS	7.3 km	MPC · JPL
26991	1997 WZ_{30}	—	November 29, 1997	Socorro	LINEAR	·	6.0 km	MPC · JPL
26992	1997 WE_{47}	—	November 26, 1997	Socorro	LINEAR	EOS	5.6 km	MPC · JPL
26993 Littlewood	1997 XC_{1}	Littlewood	December 3, 1997	Prescott	P. G. Comba	·	4.0 km	MPC · JPL
26994	1997 XU_{1}	—	December 2, 1997	Nachi-Katsuura	Y. Shimizu, T. Urata	EOS	6.7 km	MPC · JPL
26995	1997 XS_{11}	—	December 5, 1997	Nachi-Katsuura	Y. Shimizu, T. Urata	EOS	6.6 km	MPC · JPL
26996	1997 YH_{3}	—	December 16, 1997	Xinglong	SCAP	(5)	4.6 km	MPC · JPL
26997	1997 YJ_{5}	—	December 25, 1997	Oizumi	T. Kobayashi	CYB	15 km	MPC · JPL
26998 Iriso	1997 YX_{6}	Iriso	December 25, 1997	Chichibu	N. Satō	·	9.0 km	MPC · JPL
26999	1998 BQ_{41}	—	January 28, 1998	Haleakala	NEAT	·	5.8 km	MPC · JPL
27000	1998 BO_{44}	—	January 22, 1998	Socorro	LINEAR	·	15 km	MPC · JPL

back to top

== See also ==
- Meanings of minor-planet names: 26001–27000
