= 3425 Hurukawa =

Main-belt asteroid

Discovery
- Discovered by: K. Reinmuth
- Discovery site: Heidelberg Obs.
- Discovery date: 29 January 1929

Designations
- Named after: Kiichirō Furukawa (Japanese astronomer)
- Alternative designations: 1929 BD · 1951 GB; 1971 DJ_{1} · 1978 PN; 1979 SG_{1} · 1981 DW_{3} A903 CB
- Minor planet category: main-belt · Eos

Orbital characteristics
- Epoch 4 September 2017 (JD 2458000.5)
- Uncertainty parameter 0
- Observation arc: 114.16 yr (41,697 days)
- Aphelion: 3.2541 AU
- Perihelion: 2.7470 AU
- Semi-major axis: 3.0006 AU
- Eccentricity: 0.0845
- Orbital period (sidereal): 5.20 yr (1,898 days)
- Mean anomaly: 66.235°
- Mean motion: 0° 11^{m} 22.56^{s} / day
- Inclination: 9.2123°
- Longitude of ascending node: 291.51°
- Argument of perihelion: 135.02°

Physical characteristics
- Dimensions: 21.21±0.38 km 25.25 km (derived); 25.36±2.8 km 25.4 km 27.81±0.54 km
- Synodic rotation period: 16 h 24.8158±0.0402 h 24.84±0.01 h
- Geometric albedo: 0.100±0.004; 0.1103 (derived); 0.1315; 0.171±0.026
- Spectral type: S
- Absolute magnitude (H): 10.75±0.27 · 10.8 · 10.837±0.002 (R) · 10.9 · 11.0

3425 Hurukawa, provisional designation 1929 BD, is a stony Eoan asteroid from the outer region of the asteroid belt, approximately 25 kilometers in diameter. It was discovered by German astronomer Karl Reinmuth at Heidelberg Observatory on 29 January 1929, and named after Japanese astronomer Kiichirō Furukawa.

== Orbit and classification ==
Hurukawa is a member of the Eos family (606), the largest asteroid family in the outer main belt consisting of nearly 10,000 asteroids.. It orbits the Sun at a distance of 2.7–3.3 AU once every 5 years and 2 months (1,898 days). Its orbit has an eccentricity of 0.08 and an inclination of 9° with respect to the ecliptic. In 1903, a first precovery was taken at the discovering observatory, extending the asteroid's observation arc by 26 years prior to its official discovery.

== Physical characteristics ==
Hurukawa has been characterized as a common S-type asteroid.

=== Rotation period ===
In September 2005, a rotational lightcurve of Hurukawa was obtained from photometric observations by French astronomer Raymond Poncy. It gave a well-defined, slightly longer-than-average rotation period of 24.84±0.01 hours with a brightness variation of 0.47 in magnitude (U=3-). The period was confirmed by observations taken at the U.S. Palomar Transient Factory in August 2010, which rendered a period of 24.8158±0.0402 hours and an amplitude of 0.17 (U=2), superseding a third period of 16 hours from a fragmentary lightcurve obtained by French astronomer René Roy in 2007 (U=1).

=== Diameter and albedo ===
According to the surveys carried out by the Infrared Astronomical Satellite IRAS, the Japanese Akari satellite, and NASA's Wide-field Infrared Survey Explorer with its subsequent NEOWISE mission, Hurukawa measures between 21.3 and 27.8 kilometers in diameter and its surface has an untypically low albedo between 0.10 and 0.17. The Collaborative Asteroid Lightcurve Link derives an albedo of 0.11 and a diameter of 25.3 kilometers.

== Naming ==
This minor planet was named in honor of Japanese Kiichirō Furukawa (1929–2016), who was an astronomer at Tokyo Astronomical Observatory and an observer and discoverer of minor planets himself. The official naming citation was published by the Minor Planet Center on 16 December 1986 (M.P.C. 11443).
