= Kiichirō Furukawa =

Japanese astronomer

- 古川 麒一郎
- Born: July 22, 1929; Japan
- Died: June 29, 2016 (aged 86)
- Known for: astronomer, discoverer of minor planets
- Scientific career
- Fields: Astrometry; Celestial mechanics Geodesy
- Workplaces: Tokyo Astronomical Observatory
- Doctoral advisor: Jō Ueta

Minor planets discovered: 92
see § List of discovered minor planets

Kiichirō Furukawa (Japanese: 古川 麒一郎, Hepburn: Furukawa Kiichirō; Kunrei: Hurukawa Kiitirô, 22 July 1929 – 29 June 2016) was a Japanese astronomer and discoverer of minor planets at the Tokyo Astronomical Observatory. Furukawa was also associated with Nagoya University Department of Astrophysics.

== Awards and honors ==
Asteroid 3425 Hurukawa, a member of the Eos family and discovered by Karl Reinmuth at Heidelberg in 1929, was named in his honor. The official naming citation was published by the Minor Planet Center (MPC) on 16 December 1986 (M.P.C. 11443).

== Discoveries ==
Kiichirō Furukawa was a prolific discoverer of asteroids, credited by the MPC under the name K. Hurukawa with a total of 92 co-discovered numbered minor planets, all of them in collaboration with astronomer Hiroki Kosai.

=== List of discovered minor planets ===
2271 Kiso	22 October 1976	list^{[A]}
2330 Ontake	18 February 1977	list^{[A]}
2470 Agematsu	22 October 1976	list^{[A]}
2924 Mitake-mura	18 February 1977	list^{[A]}
2960 Ohtaki	18 February 1977	list^{[A]}
3111 Misuzu	19 February 1977	list^{[A]}
3249 Musashino	18 February 1977	list^{[A]}
3291 Dunlap	14 November 1982	list^{[A]}
3319 Kibi	12 March 1977	list^{[A]}
3320 Namba	14 November 1982	list^{[A]}
3391 Sinon	18 February 1977	list^{[A]}
3607 Naniwa	18 February 1977	list^{[A]}
3878 Jyoumon	14 November 1982	list^{[A]}
4072 Yayoi	30 October 1981	list^{[A]}
4077 Asuka	13 December 1982	list^{[A]}
4186 Tamashima	18 February 1977	list^{[A]}
4272 Entsuji	12 March 1977	list^{[A]}
4526 Konko	22 May 1982	list^{[A]}
4812 Hakuhou	18 February 1977	list^{[A]}
4855 Tenpyou	14 November 1982	list^{[A]}

4890 Shikanosima	14 November 1982	list^{[A]}
4929 Yamatai	13 December 1982	list^{[A]}
4963 Kanroku	18 February 1977	list^{[A]}
5017 Tenchi	18 February 1977	list^{[A]}
5018 Tenmu	19 February 1977	list^{[A]}
5082 Nihonsyoki	18 February 1977	list^{[A]}
5454 Kojiki	12 March 1977	list^{[A]}
5466 Makibi	30 November 1986	list^{[A]}
5541 Seimei	22 October 1976	list^{[A]}
6031 Ryokan	26 January 1982	list^{[A]}
6218 Mizushima	12 March 1977	list^{[A]}
6818 Sessyu	11 March 1983	list^{[A]}
6846 Kansazan	22 October 1976	list^{[A]}
7104 Manyousyu	18 February 1977	list^{[A]}
7105 Yousyozan	18 February 1977	list^{[A]}
7562 Kagiroino-Oka	30 November 1986	list^{[A]}
7627 Wakenokiyomaro	18 February 1977	list^{[A]}
7634 Shizutani-Kou	14 November 1982	list^{[A]}
7991 Kaguyahime	30 October 1981	list^{[A]}
8133 Takanochoei	18 February 1977	list^{[A]}

8144 Hiragagennai	14 November 1982	list^{[A]}
9147 Kourakuen	18 February 1977	list^{[A]}
9153 Chikurinji	30 October 1981	list^{[A]}
9293 Kamogata	13 December 1982	list^{[A]}
9719 Yakage	18 February 1977	list^{[A]}
10006 Sessai	22 October 1976	list^{[A]}
10008 Raisanyo	18 February 1977	list^{[A]}
10009 Hirosetanso	12 March 1977	list^{[A]}
10453 Banzan	18 February 1977	list^{[A]}
11254 Konkohekisui	18 February 1977	list^{[A]}
11255 Fujiiekio	18 February 1977	list^{[A]}
11442 Seijin-Sanso	22 October 1976	list^{[A]}
11827 Wasyuzan	14 November 1982	list^{[A]}
12186 Mitukurigen	12 March 1977	list^{[A]}
12221 Ogatakoan	14 November 1982	list^{[A]}
12682 Kawada	14 November 1982	list^{[A]}
14313 Dodaira	22 October 1976	list^{[A]}
14314 Tokigawa	18 February 1977	list^{[A]}
14315 Ogawamachi	12 March 1977	list^{[A]}
14316 Higashichichibu	12 March 1977	list^{[A]}

14338 Shibakoukan	14 November 1982	list^{[A]}
14795 Syoyou	12 March 1977	list^{[A]}
14820 Aizuyaichi	14 November 1982	list^{[A]}
14821 Motaeno	14 November 1982	list^{[A]}
15202 Yamada-Houkoku	12 March 1977	list^{[A]}
15671 Suzannedébarbat	12 March 1977	list^{[A]}
15672 Sato-Norio	12 March 1977	list^{[A]}
16357 Risanpei	22 October 1976	list^{[A]}
18289 Yokoyamakoichi	22 October 1976	list^{[A]}
18290 Sumiyoshi	18 February 1977	list^{[A]}
18291 Wani	18 February 1977	list^{[A]}
18322 Korokan	14 November 1982	list^{[A]}
19083 Mizuki	18 February 1977	list^{[A]}
(19917) 1977 EE_{8}	12 March 1977	list^{[A]}
19953 Takeo	14 November 1982	list^{[A]}
19954 Shigeyoshi	14 November 1982	list^{[A]}
20962 Michizane	12 March 1977	list^{[A]}
22277 Hirado	14 November 1982	list^{[A]}
24640 Omiwa	13 December 1982	list^{[A]}
26794 Yukioniimi	18 February 1977	list^{[A]}

26806 Kushiike	22 May 1982	list^{[A]}
(26808) 1982 VB_{4}	14 November 1982	list^{[A]}
34995 Dainihonshi	18 February 1977	list^{[A]}
34996 Mitokoumon	18 February 1977	list^{[A]}
(37529) 1977 EL_{8}	12 March 1977	list^{[A]}
(43753) 1982 VN_{3}	14 November 1982	list^{[A]}
(48408) 1982 VN_{2}	14 November 1982	list^{[A]}
52260 Ureshino	22 May 1982	list^{[A]}
52261 Izumishikibu	14 November 1982	list^{[A]}
(65635) 1977 EA_{8}	12 March 1977	list^{[A]}
(73639) 1977 EL_{7}	12 March 1977	list^{[A]}
(164616) 1986 WV_{8}	30 November 1986	list^{[A]}
Co-discovery made with:^{A} H. Kosai

== See also ==
- List of minor planet discoverers § K. Hurukawa
