= Kiso Observatory =

Observatory at Mt. Ontake, Japan

- Organization: University of Tokyo
- Observatory code: 381
- Location: Mount Ontake, Nagano Prefecture
- Coordinates: 35°47′50″N 137°37′32″E
- Altitude: 1,130 m (3,710 ft)
- Established: 1974
- Website: www.ioa.s.u-tokyo.ac.jp/kisohp/,%20http://www.ioa.s.u-tokyo.ac.jp/kisohp/top_e.html

Telescopes
- Unnamed: 105 cm Schmidt telescope
- K.3T: 30 cm robotic telescope
- Location of Kiso Observatory

Kiso Observatory (Japanese: 木曽観測所: Kiso Kansokujo) is an astronomical observatory located at Mt. Ontake in Japan. The observatory was founded in 1974, originally as a branch observatory of the Tokyo Astronomical Observatory, with the express objective of studying extra-galactic astronomical objects. Since 1988, it has been maintained by the Institute of Astronomy, Faculty of Science, University of Tokyo (Japanese: 東京大学天文学教育研究センター). It is home to the 105 cm Schmidt Telescope. It is currently open for use by astronomers from all over the world.

In 2002, a 30 cm, fully automatic telescope was added with the designation K.3T (Kiso 0.3-meter Telescope). It is mainly used in the observation of variable stars. It has been automated to aid in the making of numerous repeat observations over long periods of time.
