= List of minor planets: 879001–880000 =

The following is a partial list of minor planets, running from minor-planet number 879001 through 880000, inclusive. The primary data for this and other partial lists is based on JPL's "Small-Body Orbital Elements" and data available from the Minor Planet Center. Critical list information is also provided by the MPC, unless otherwise specified from Lowell Observatory. A detailed description of the table's columns and additional sources are given on the main page including a complete list of every page in this series, and a statistical break-up on the dynamical classification of minor planets.

Also see the summary list of all named bodies in numerical and alphabetical order, and the corresponding naming citations for the number range of this particular list. New namings may only be added to this list after official publication, as the preannouncement of names is condemned by the Working Group for Small Bodies Nomenclature of the International Astronomical Union.

Near-Earth obj.	MBA (inner)	MBA (outer)	Centaur
Mars-crosser	MBA (middle)	Jupiter trojan	Trans-Neptunian obj.
Unclassified

== 879001–879100 ==
Designation			Discovery			Properties		Ref
Permanent	Provisional	Named after	Date	Site	Discoverer(s)	Category	Diam.	Ref
879001	2013 GW_{159}	—	April 15, 2013	Haleakala	Pan-STARRS 1	·	1.4 km	MPC · JPL
879002	2013 HZ_{4}	—	April 18, 2013	Mount Lemmon	Mount Lemmon Survey	critical	740 m	MPC · JPL
879003	2013 HM_{37}	—	April 9, 2013	Haleakala	Pan-STARRS 1	·	1.7 km	MPC · JPL
879004	2013 HV_{44}	—	October 24, 2011	Mount Lemmon	Mount Lemmon Survey	·	430 m	MPC · JPL
879005	2013 HZ_{57}	—	October 17, 2010	Mount Lemmon	Mount Lemmon Survey	·	1.2 km	MPC · JPL
879006	2013 HE_{62}	—	December 14, 2015	Mount Lemmon	Mount Lemmon Survey	critical	620 m	MPC · JPL
879007	2013 HQ_{66}	—	April 16, 2013	Cerro Tololo-DECam	DECam	HOF	1.6 km	MPC · JPL
879008	2013 HZ_{78}	—	April 9, 2013	Haleakala	Pan-STARRS 1	·	1 km	MPC · JPL
879009	2013 HD_{85}	—	April 9, 2013	Haleakala	Pan-STARRS 1	·	1.4 km	MPC · JPL
879010	2013 HM_{103}	—	November 26, 2011	Mount Lemmon	Mount Lemmon Survey	·	1.2 km	MPC · JPL
879011	2013 HT_{110}	—	April 10, 2013	Haleakala	Pan-STARRS 1	·	1.2 km	MPC · JPL
879012	2013 HU_{117}	—	April 16, 2013	Cerro Tololo-DECam	DECam	·	700 m	MPC · JPL
879013	2013 HA_{119}	—	April 10, 2013	Haleakala	Pan-STARRS 1	MAS	530 m	MPC · JPL
879014	2013 HY_{146}	—	January 1, 2012	Mount Lemmon	Mount Lemmon Survey	KOR	900 m	MPC · JPL
879015	2013 HB_{157}	—	April 16, 2013	Haleakala	Pan-STARRS 1	·	2.4 km	MPC · JPL
879016	2013 HL_{159}	—	April 19, 2013	Haleakala	Pan-STARRS 1	·	1.3 km	MPC · JPL
879017	2013 HO_{159}	—	April 30, 2013	Kitt Peak	Spacewatch	·	1.5 km	MPC · JPL
879018	2013 HQ_{161}	—	April 16, 2013	Haleakala	Pan-STARRS 1	·	830 m	MPC · JPL
879019	2013 HP_{163}	—	April 30, 2005	Kitt Peak	Spacewatch	H	420 m	MPC · JPL
879020	2013 HA_{164}	—	April 16, 2013	Haleakala	Pan-STARRS 1	·	1.4 km	MPC · JPL
879021	2013 JB_{4}	—	February 22, 2006	Catalina	CSS	·	460 m	MPC · JPL
879022	2013 JW_{5}	—	November 27, 2009	Kitt Peak	Spacewatch	H	670 m	MPC · JPL
879023	2013 JG_{8}	—	April 13, 2013	Mount Lemmon	Mount Lemmon Survey	·	2.4 km	MPC · JPL
879024	2013 JV_{15}	—	February 19, 2012	Kitt Peak	Spacewatch	3:2	3.5 km	MPC · JPL
879025	2013 JA_{30}	—	May 10, 2013	Palomar	Palomar Transient Factory	H	360 m	MPC · JPL
879026	2013 JA_{34}	—	May 12, 2013	Kitt Peak	Spacewatch	T_{j} (2.97)	1.9 km	MPC · JPL
879027	2013 JQ_{34}	—	October 18, 2003	Palomar	NEAT	H	400 m	MPC · JPL
879028	2013 JA_{60}	—	May 1, 2013	Mount Lemmon	Mount Lemmon Survey	·	960 m	MPC · JPL
879029	2013 JH_{74}	—	May 8, 2013	Haleakala	Pan-STARRS 1	·	730 m	MPC · JPL
879030	2013 JZ_{78}	—	May 1, 2013	Mount Lemmon	Mount Lemmon Survey	H	390 m	MPC · JPL
879031	2013 LG_{10}	—	June 4, 2013	Mount Lemmon	Mount Lemmon Survey	·	640 m	MPC · JPL
879032	2013 LA_{18}	—	May 12, 2013	Mount Lemmon	Mount Lemmon Survey	·	1.6 km	MPC · JPL
879033	2013 LW_{26}	—	June 2, 2013	Kitt Peak	Spacewatch	H	400 m	MPC · JPL
879034	2013 LX_{29}	—	May 15, 2013	Haleakala	Pan-STARRS 1	·	760 m	MPC · JPL
879035	2013 LS_{31}	—	April 15, 2013	Haleakala	Pan-STARRS 1	·	1.2 km	MPC · JPL
879036	2013 LX_{37}	—	June 6, 2013	Oukaïmeden	M. Ory	·	2.0 km	MPC · JPL
879037	2013 LD_{39}	—	June 12, 2013	Haleakala	Pan-STARRS 1	·	1.5 km	MPC · JPL
879038	2013 MW_{15}	—	June 19, 2013	Mount Lemmon	Mount Lemmon Survey	·	2.1 km	MPC · JPL
879039	2013 MR_{16}	—	June 18, 2013	Haleakala	Pan-STARRS 1	·	630 m	MPC · JPL
879040	2013 MX_{16}	—	June 18, 2013	Haleakala	Pan-STARRS 1	T_{j} (2.94)	3.0 km	MPC · JPL
879041	2013 MR_{17}	—	June 18, 2013	Haleakala	Pan-STARRS 1	·	1.8 km	MPC · JPL
879042	2013 MV_{24}	—	June 18, 2013	Haleakala	Pan-STARRS 1	·	1.7 km	MPC · JPL
879043	2013 NH_{3}	—	July 1, 2013	Haleakala	Pan-STARRS 1	TIR	2.2 km	MPC · JPL
879044	2013 NR_{11}	—	July 3, 2002	Palomar	NEAT	T_{j} (2.94)	1.8 km	MPC · JPL
879045	2013 NU_{15}	—	July 12, 2013	Haleakala	Pan-STARRS 1	T_{j} (2.98)	1.8 km	MPC · JPL
879046	2013 NN_{16}	—	July 13, 2013	Mount Lemmon	Mount Lemmon Survey	·	1.9 km	MPC · JPL
879047	2013 NM_{26}	—	October 10, 2008	Mount Lemmon	Mount Lemmon Survey	·	1.8 km	MPC · JPL
879048	2013 NX_{32}	—	February 10, 2011	Mount Lemmon	Mount Lemmon Survey	EOS	1.3 km	MPC · JPL
879049	2013 NZ_{34}	—	July 13, 2013	Haleakala	Pan-STARRS 1	critical	540 m	MPC · JPL
879050	2013 NA_{35}	—	July 13, 2013	Haleakala	Pan-STARRS 1	EUN	900 m	MPC · JPL
879051	2013 NX_{36}	—	July 13, 2013	Haleakala	Pan-STARRS 1	·	930 m	MPC · JPL
879052	2013 NN_{37}	—	July 14, 2013	Haleakala	Pan-STARRS 1	EOS	1.3 km	MPC · JPL
879053	2013 NO_{37}	—	July 4, 2013	Haleakala	Pan-STARRS 1	·	760 m	MPC · JPL
879054	2013 NJ_{38}	—	July 15, 2013	Haleakala	Pan-STARRS 1	·	720 m	MPC · JPL
879055	2013 NK_{39}	—	June 20, 2013	Mount Lemmon	Mount Lemmon Survey	·	750 m	MPC · JPL
879056	2013 NL_{39}	—	July 14, 2013	Haleakala	Pan-STARRS 1	·	2.1 km	MPC · JPL
879057	2013 NM_{39}	—	July 1, 2013	Haleakala	Pan-STARRS 1	·	1.2 km	MPC · JPL
879058	2013 NU_{39}	—	July 14, 2013	Haleakala	Pan-STARRS 1	·	1.6 km	MPC · JPL
879059	2013 NZ_{39}	—	July 2, 2013	Haleakala	Pan-STARRS 1	·	2.1 km	MPC · JPL
879060	2013 NA_{40}	—	July 2, 2013	Haleakala	Pan-STARRS 1	·	1.9 km	MPC · JPL
879061	2013 NH_{40}	—	July 15, 2013	Haleakala	Pan-STARRS 1	·	1.6 km	MPC · JPL
879062	2013 NK_{40}	—	July 12, 2013	Haleakala	Pan-STARRS 1	·	1.3 km	MPC · JPL
879063	2013 NX_{41}	—	July 15, 2013	Haleakala	Pan-STARRS 1	·	1.6 km	MPC · JPL
879064	2013 NA_{42}	—	July 9, 2013	Haleakala	Pan-STARRS 1	·	2.0 km	MPC · JPL
879065	2013 NB_{44}	—	July 8, 2013	Haleakala	Pan-STARRS 1	·	850 m	MPC · JPL
879066	2013 NS_{45}	—	July 8, 2013	Haleakala	Pan-STARRS 1	·	2.5 km	MPC · JPL
879067	2013 NY_{46}	—	July 4, 2013	Haleakala	Pan-STARRS 1	·	1.5 km	MPC · JPL
879068	2013 NM_{48}	—	July 13, 2013	Haleakala	Pan-STARRS 1	·	1.3 km	MPC · JPL
879069	2013 NL_{49}	—	July 14, 2013	Haleakala	Pan-STARRS 1	·	1.8 km	MPC · JPL
879070	2013 NN_{50}	—	July 12, 2013	Haleakala	Pan-STARRS 1	H	360 m	MPC · JPL
879071	2013 NL_{54}	—	July 13, 2013	Haleakala	Pan-STARRS 1	HYG	1.8 km	MPC · JPL
879072	2013 NG_{76}	—	July 14, 2013	Haleakala	Pan-STARRS 1	·	440 m	MPC · JPL
879073	2013 NK_{80}	—	July 14, 2013	Haleakala	Pan-STARRS 1	·	1.7 km	MPC · JPL
879074	2013 NX_{81}	—	July 1, 2013	Haleakala	Pan-STARRS 1	·	1.2 km	MPC · JPL
879075	2013 OB_{3}	—	July 17, 2013	Haleakala	Pan-STARRS 1	PHO	840 m	MPC · JPL
879076	2013 OY_{4}	—	July 13, 2013	Haleakala	Pan-STARRS 1	·	820 m	MPC · JPL
879077	2013 OK_{10}	—	July 13, 2013	Haleakala	Pan-STARRS 1	PHO	680 m	MPC · JPL
879078	2013 OX_{14}	—	December 12, 2014	Haleakala	Pan-STARRS 1	·	1.8 km	MPC · JPL
879079	2013 OH_{15}	—	July 19, 2013	Haleakala	Pan-STARRS 1	·	1.8 km	MPC · JPL
879080	2013 OU_{17}	—	July 18, 2013	Haleakala	Pan-STARRS 1	·	810 m	MPC · JPL
879081	2013 PE_{1}	—	August 2, 2013	Haleakala	Pan-STARRS 1	·	2.0 km	MPC · JPL
879082	2013 PZ_{3}	—	July 28, 2013	Siding Spring	Falla, N.	·	1.3 km	MPC · JPL
879083	2013 PK_{7}	—	August 1, 2013	Haleakala	Pan-STARRS 1	PHO	610 m	MPC · JPL
879084	2013 PT_{9}	—	August 3, 2013	Haleakala	Pan-STARRS 1	·	2.1 km	MPC · JPL
879085	2013 PQ_{10}	—	August 2, 2013	Palomar	Palomar Transient Factory	PHO	880 m	MPC · JPL
879086	2013 PP_{19}	—	July 14, 2013	Haleakala	Pan-STARRS 1	·	1.4 km	MPC · JPL
879087	2013 PU_{22}	—	August 8, 2013	Haleakala	Pan-STARRS 1	·	1.9 km	MPC · JPL
879088	2013 PW_{23}	—	February 14, 2010	Mount Lemmon	Mount Lemmon Survey	EOS	1.4 km	MPC · JPL
879089	2013 PM_{25}	—	June 16, 2013	Mount Lemmon	Mount Lemmon Survey	·	2.1 km	MPC · JPL
879090	2013 PH_{30}	—	April 18, 2012	Mount Lemmon	Mount Lemmon Survey	·	1.2 km	MPC · JPL
879091	2013 PF_{50}	—	August 12, 2013	Haleakala	Pan-STARRS 1	EUP	2.0 km	MPC · JPL
879092	2013 PR_{50}	—	August 12, 2013	Haleakala	Pan-STARRS 1	·	1.8 km	MPC · JPL
879093	2013 PK_{54}	—	February 8, 2011	Mount Lemmon	Mount Lemmon Survey	·	740 m	MPC · JPL
879094	2013 PP_{57}	—	July 9, 2013	Haleakala	Pan-STARRS 1	·	980 m	MPC · JPL
879095	2013 PG_{63}	—	June 20, 2013	Haleakala	Pan-STARRS 1	HYG	2.1 km	MPC · JPL
879096	2013 PV_{64}	—	June 20, 2013	Mount Lemmon	Mount Lemmon Survey	·	1.5 km	MPC · JPL
879097	2013 PY_{68}	—	August 12, 2013	Haleakala	Pan-STARRS 1	·	840 m	MPC · JPL
879098	2013 PS_{72}	—	October 15, 2009	Catalina	CSS	ADE	2.1 km	MPC · JPL
879099	2013 PT_{75}	—	August 8, 2013	Kitt Peak	Spacewatch	·	1.8 km	MPC · JPL
879100	2013 PS_{81}	—	August 14, 2013	Haleakala	Pan-STARRS 1	·	2.1 km	MPC · JPL

== 879101–879200 ==
back to top

Designation			Discovery			Properties		Ref
Permanent	Provisional	Named after	Date	Site	Discoverer(s)	Category	Diam.	Ref
879101	2013 PD_{82}	—	November 9, 2008	Kitt Peak	Spacewatch	THM	1.6 km	MPC · JPL
879102	2013 PV_{84}	—	August 9, 2013	Haleakala	Pan-STARRS 1	·	800 m	MPC · JPL
879103	2013 PE_{86}	—	August 2, 2013	Haleakala	Pan-STARRS 1	MAR	580 m	MPC · JPL
879104	2013 PP_{86}	—	August 9, 2013	Haleakala	Pan-STARRS 1	·	790 m	MPC · JPL
879105	2013 PT_{88}	—	August 12, 2013	Haleakala	Pan-STARRS 1	·	770 m	MPC · JPL
879106	2013 PP_{90}	—	August 12, 2013	Kitt Peak	Spacewatch	·	1.9 km	MPC · JPL
879107	2013 PC_{91}	—	August 15, 2013	Haleakala	Pan-STARRS 1	·	2.0 km	MPC · JPL
879108	2013 PE_{91}	—	August 12, 2013	Haleakala	Pan-STARRS 1	EOS	1.2 km	MPC · JPL
879109	2013 PB_{92}	—	August 14, 2013	Haleakala	Pan-STARRS 1	·	2.3 km	MPC · JPL
879110	2013 PJ_{96}	—	August 15, 2013	Haleakala	Pan-STARRS 1	EOS	1.1 km	MPC · JPL
879111	2013 PL_{97}	—	August 9, 2013	Haleakala	Pan-STARRS 1	·	1.9 km	MPC · JPL
879112	2013 PX_{97}	—	August 14, 2013	Haleakala	Pan-STARRS 1	·	720 m	MPC · JPL
879113	2013 PX_{98}	—	August 8, 2013	Haleakala	Pan-STARRS 1	·	2.3 km	MPC · JPL
879114	2013 PW_{102}	—	August 15, 2013	Haleakala	Pan-STARRS 1	·	2.0 km	MPC · JPL
879115	2013 PB_{106}	—	August 10, 2013	Kitt Peak	Spacewatch	·	1.4 km	MPC · JPL
879116	2013 PK_{111}	—	August 8, 2013	Kitt Peak	Spacewatch	·	2.4 km	MPC · JPL
879117	2013 PO_{112}	—	August 12, 2013	Haleakala	Pan-STARRS 1	·	2.2 km	MPC · JPL
879118	2013 PG_{113}	—	August 15, 2013	Haleakala	Pan-STARRS 1	·	1.6 km	MPC · JPL
879119	2013 PQ_{113}	—	August 12, 2013	Haleakala	Pan-STARRS 1	·	1.8 km	MPC · JPL
879120	2013 PL_{114}	—	August 15, 2013	Haleakala	Pan-STARRS 1	·	1.2 km	MPC · JPL
879121	2013 PR_{118}	—	August 15, 2013	Haleakala	Pan-STARRS 1	·	1.5 km	MPC · JPL
879122	2013 PQ_{122}	—	August 8, 2013	Kitt Peak	Spacewatch	·	1.9 km	MPC · JPL
879123	2013 PX_{127}	—	August 15, 2013	Haleakala	Pan-STARRS 1	·	1.5 km	MPC · JPL
879124	2013 PR_{144}	—	August 10, 2013	Mount Lemmon	Mount Lemmon Survey	·	2.1 km	MPC · JPL
879125	2013 QV_{7}	—	August 17, 2013	Haleakala	Pan-STARRS 1	·	1.7 km	MPC · JPL
879126	2013 QE_{12}	—	September 28, 2009	Mount Lemmon	Mount Lemmon Survey	(5)	930 m	MPC · JPL
879127	2013 QH_{15}	—	August 28, 2013	Haleakala	Pan-STARRS 1	·	1.5 km	MPC · JPL
879128	2013 QS_{15}	—	August 28, 2013	Haleakala	Pan-STARRS 1	·	740 m	MPC · JPL
879129	2013 QW_{15}	—	October 2, 2000	Anderson Mesa	LONEOS	·	490 m	MPC · JPL
879130	2013 QX_{21}	—	August 26, 2013	Haleakala	Pan-STARRS 1	THB	1.8 km	MPC · JPL
879131	2013 QM_{23}	—	August 9, 2013	Kitt Peak	Spacewatch	·	860 m	MPC · JPL
879132	2013 QK_{29}	—	October 27, 2008	Kitt Peak	Spacewatch	THM	1.6 km	MPC · JPL
879133	2013 QO_{31}	—	August 12, 2013	Haleakala	Pan-STARRS 1	·	2.0 km	MPC · JPL
879134	2013 QQ_{34}	—	August 30, 2013	Haleakala	Pan-STARRS 1	·	1.8 km	MPC · JPL
879135	2013 QT_{42}	—	August 8, 2013	Kitt Peak	Spacewatch	·	820 m	MPC · JPL
879136	2013 QO_{45}	—	October 17, 2010	Mount Lemmon	Mount Lemmon Survey	·	380 m	MPC · JPL
879137	2013 QU_{45}	—	August 15, 2013	Haleakala	Pan-STARRS 1	·	1.7 km	MPC · JPL
879138	2013 QL_{50}	—	August 9, 2013	Kitt Peak	Spacewatch	·	2.1 km	MPC · JPL
879139	2013 QJ_{54}	—	July 28, 2013	Kitt Peak	Spacewatch	·	2.1 km	MPC · JPL
879140	2013 QJ_{55}	—	August 26, 2013	Haleakala	Pan-STARRS 1	·	1.9 km	MPC · JPL
879141	2013 QE_{60}	—	August 26, 2013	Haleakala	Pan-STARRS 1	·	930 m	MPC · JPL
879142	2013 QZ_{63}	—	June 19, 2013	Mount Lemmon	Mount Lemmon Survey	V	510 m	MPC · JPL
879143	2013 QU_{67}	—	August 13, 2013	Kitt Peak	Spacewatch	·	740 m	MPC · JPL
879144	2013 QO_{85}	—	September 28, 2009	Mount Lemmon	Mount Lemmon Survey	·	1.0 km	MPC · JPL
879145	2013 QG_{87}	—	August 26, 2013	Haleakala	Pan-STARRS 1	·	490 m	MPC · JPL
879146	2013 QB_{96}	—	August 26, 2013	Haleakala	Pan-STARRS 1	TIR	1.7 km	MPC · JPL
879147	2013 QA_{97}	—	October 2, 2006	Mount Lemmon	Mount Lemmon Survey	·	820 m	MPC · JPL
879148	2013 QJ_{97}	—	August 28, 2013	Mount Lemmon	Mount Lemmon Survey	EUP	2.2 km	MPC · JPL
879149	2013 QQ_{97}	—	August 28, 2013	Mount Lemmon	Mount Lemmon Survey	·	1.5 km	MPC · JPL
879150	2013 QC_{98}	—	August 17, 2013	Haleakala	Pan-STARRS 1	·	2.4 km	MPC · JPL
879151	2013 QK_{98}	—	June 15, 2018	Haleakala	Pan-STARRS 1	·	1.7 km	MPC · JPL
879152	2013 QH_{99}	—	January 27, 2016	Haleakala	Pan-STARRS 1	(7605)	2.4 km	MPC · JPL
879153	2013 QR_{101}	—	September 3, 2008	Kitt Peak	Spacewatch	·	1.5 km	MPC · JPL
879154	2013 QU_{101}	—	August 31, 2013	Haleakala	Pan-STARRS 1	EUP	2.5 km	MPC · JPL
879155	2013 RU_{15}	—	September 3, 2013	Haleakala	Pan-STARRS 1	VER	1.8 km	MPC · JPL
879156	2013 RV_{23}	—	September 3, 2013	Mount Lemmon	Mount Lemmon Survey	·	1.9 km	MPC · JPL
879157	2013 RC_{33}	—	September 3, 2013	Tincana	Zolnowski, M., Kusiak, M.	·	910 m	MPC · JPL
879158	2013 RT_{34}	—	September 7, 2004	Kitt Peak	Spacewatch	·	1.2 km	MPC · JPL
879159	2013 RA_{38}	—	August 21, 2007	Bisei	BATTeRS	·	2.2 km	MPC · JPL
879160	2013 RK_{39}	—	September 3, 2013	Mount Lemmon	Mount Lemmon Survey	·	2.1 km	MPC · JPL
879161	2013 RW_{45}	—	September 10, 2013	Haleakala	Pan-STARRS 1	LIX	2.2 km	MPC · JPL
879162	2013 RY_{46}	—	September 17, 2009	Mount Lemmon	Mount Lemmon Survey	·	450 m	MPC · JPL
879163	2013 RM_{47}	—	September 5, 2013	Kitt Peak	Spacewatch	·	750 m	MPC · JPL
879164	2013 RK_{51}	—	September 10, 2013	Haleakala	Pan-STARRS 1	THB	1.7 km	MPC · JPL
879165	2013 RD_{56}	—	August 26, 2013	Haleakala	Pan-STARRS 1	·	1.9 km	MPC · JPL
879166	2013 RU_{57}	—	September 10, 2013	Haleakala	Pan-STARRS 1	·	1.8 km	MPC · JPL
879167	2013 RW_{60}	—	October 25, 2008	Kitt Peak	Spacewatch	·	2.5 km	MPC · JPL
879168	2013 RF_{65}	—	August 14, 2013	Haleakala	Pan-STARRS 1	·	1.5 km	MPC · JPL
879169	2013 RC_{66}	—	October 14, 1998	Kitt Peak	Spacewatch	NYS	790 m	MPC · JPL
879170	2013 RD_{66}	—	February 13, 2010	Mount Lemmon	Mount Lemmon Survey	·	3.3 km	MPC · JPL
879171	2013 RD_{75}	—	September 3, 2013	Mount Lemmon	Mount Lemmon Survey	NYS	860 m	MPC · JPL
879172	2013 RE_{75}	—	September 10, 2013	Haleakala	Pan-STARRS 1	·	1.9 km	MPC · JPL
879173	2013 RX_{77}	—	September 1, 2013	Mount Lemmon	Mount Lemmon Survey	·	2.2 km	MPC · JPL
879174	2013 RG_{81}	—	September 3, 2013	Mount Lemmon	Mount Lemmon Survey	TIR	2.0 km	MPC · JPL
879175	2013 RF_{84}	—	September 6, 2013	Kitt Peak	Spacewatch	TIR	2.0 km	MPC · JPL
879176	2013 RU_{86}	—	September 13, 2013	Kitt Peak	Spacewatch	·	1.5 km	MPC · JPL
879177	2013 RA_{106}	—	September 12, 2007	Kitt Peak	Spacewatch	·	2.2 km	MPC · JPL
879178	2013 RT_{106}	—	September 14, 2013	Haleakala	Pan-STARRS 1	·	2.2 km	MPC · JPL
879179	2013 RD_{110}	—	September 14, 2013	Mount Lemmon	Mount Lemmon Survey	·	470 m	MPC · JPL
879180	2013 RL_{111}	—	September 6, 2013	Kitt Peak	Spacewatch	·	980 m	MPC · JPL
879181	2013 RO_{112}	—	September 12, 2013	Mount Lemmon	Mount Lemmon Survey	·	620 m	MPC · JPL
879182	2013 RG_{115}	—	September 14, 2013	Haleakala	Pan-STARRS 1	·	630 m	MPC · JPL
879183	2013 RP_{115}	—	September 15, 2013	Mount Lemmon	Mount Lemmon Survey	·	840 m	MPC · JPL
879184	2013 RR_{115}	—	September 2, 2013	Mount Lemmon	Mount Lemmon Survey	·	1.3 km	MPC · JPL
879185	2013 RT_{116}	—	September 4, 2013	Calar Alto	F. Hormuth	·	560 m	MPC · JPL
879186	2013 RJ_{117}	—	September 14, 2013	Haleakala	Pan-STARRS 1	T_{j} (2.93)	2.0 km	MPC · JPL
879187	2013 RE_{119}	—	September 14, 2013	Haleakala	Pan-STARRS 1	·	2.6 km	MPC · JPL
879188	2013 RG_{119}	—	November 26, 2014	Haleakala	Pan-STARRS 1	·	2.3 km	MPC · JPL
879189	2013 RS_{119}	—	September 10, 2013	Haleakala	Pan-STARRS 1	·	2.0 km	MPC · JPL
879190	2013 RG_{120}	—	October 25, 2014	Kitt Peak	Spacewatch	L5	6.7 km	MPC · JPL
879191	2013 RF_{121}	—	September 6, 2013	Mount Lemmon	Mount Lemmon Survey	·	1.5 km	MPC · JPL
879192	2013 RM_{121}	—	September 14, 2013	Haleakala	Pan-STARRS 1	·	2.0 km	MPC · JPL
879193	2013 RN_{121}	—	September 14, 2013	Haleakala	Pan-STARRS 1	·	1.9 km	MPC · JPL
879194	2013 RJ_{122}	—	September 2, 2013	Mount Lemmon	Mount Lemmon Survey	·	1.2 km	MPC · JPL
879195	2013 RO_{123}	—	September 10, 2013	Haleakala	Pan-STARRS 1	·	2.1 km	MPC · JPL
879196	2013 RF_{126}	—	September 14, 2013	Haleakala	Pan-STARRS 1	·	2.1 km	MPC · JPL
879197	2013 RD_{127}	—	September 3, 2013	Haleakala	Pan-STARRS 1	·	1.9 km	MPC · JPL
879198	2013 RE_{127}	—	September 12, 2013	Kitt Peak	Spacewatch	·	2.2 km	MPC · JPL
879199	2013 RZ_{128}	—	September 13, 2013	Mount Lemmon	Mount Lemmon Survey	THB	1.9 km	MPC · JPL
879200	2013 RK_{129}	—	September 14, 2013	Haleakala	Pan-STARRS 1	EOS	1.2 km	MPC · JPL

== 879201–879300 ==
back to top

Designation			Discovery			Properties		Ref
Permanent	Provisional	Named after	Date	Site	Discoverer(s)	Category	Diam.	Ref
879201	2013 RS_{130}	—	September 14, 2013	Haleakala	Pan-STARRS 1	·	2.1 km	MPC · JPL
879202	2013 RT_{130}	—	September 14, 2013	Haleakala	Pan-STARRS 1	TIR	1.7 km	MPC · JPL
879203	2013 RS_{132}	—	March 22, 2001	Kitt Peak	SKADS	·	1.0 km	MPC · JPL
879204	2013 RY_{132}	—	September 15, 2013	Mount Lemmon	Mount Lemmon Survey	·	2.0 km	MPC · JPL
879205	2013 RK_{133}	—	September 14, 2013	Haleakala	Pan-STARRS 1	·	2.1 km	MPC · JPL
879206	2013 RA_{134}	—	September 9, 2013	Haleakala	Pan-STARRS 1	·	1.9 km	MPC · JPL
879207	2013 RK_{134}	—	September 4, 2013	Mount Lemmon	Mount Lemmon Survey	THM	1.5 km	MPC · JPL
879208	2013 RK_{136}	—	September 6, 2013	Mount Lemmon	Mount Lemmon Survey	THM	1.6 km	MPC · JPL
879209	2013 RR_{139}	—	September 3, 2013	Haleakala	Pan-STARRS 1	THM	1.7 km	MPC · JPL
879210	2013 RN_{145}	—	September 15, 2013	Haleakala	Pan-STARRS 1	H	370 m	MPC · JPL
879211	2013 RZ_{146}	—	September 14, 2013	Haleakala	Pan-STARRS 1	·	890 m	MPC · JPL
879212	2013 RF_{149}	—	September 1, 2013	Mount Lemmon	Mount Lemmon Survey	·	700 m	MPC · JPL
879213	2013 RL_{151}	—	September 4, 2013	Mount Lemmon	Mount Lemmon Survey	·	1.6 km	MPC · JPL
879214	2013 RL_{153}	—	September 14, 2013	Mount Lemmon	Mount Lemmon Survey	·	490 m	MPC · JPL
879215	2013 RA_{154}	—	September 14, 2013	Kitt Peak	Spacewatch	·	1.9 km	MPC · JPL
879216	2013 RM_{154}	—	September 13, 2013	Kitt Peak	Spacewatch	·	2.2 km	MPC · JPL
879217	2013 RC_{159}	—	September 1, 2013	Mount Lemmon	Mount Lemmon Survey	·	2.1 km	MPC · JPL
879218	2013 RK_{162}	—	September 1, 2013	Mount Lemmon	Mount Lemmon Survey	·	2.0 km	MPC · JPL
879219	2013 RS_{162}	—	September 19, 1998	Sacramento Peak	SDSS	·	700 m	MPC · JPL
879220	2013 RC_{164}	—	September 6, 2013	Kitt Peak	Spacewatch	·	1.7 km	MPC · JPL
879221	2013 RX_{175}	—	September 3, 2013	Haleakala	Pan-STARRS 1	·	2.7 km	MPC · JPL
879222	2013 RE_{193}	—	September 1, 2013	Mount Lemmon	Mount Lemmon Survey	·	1.8 km	MPC · JPL
879223	2013 RQ_{193}	—	September 14, 2013	Haleakala	Pan-STARRS 1	·	1.6 km	MPC · JPL
879224	2013 SO	—	August 30, 2005	Anderson Mesa	LONEOS	·	800 m	MPC · JPL
879225	2013 SQ_{11}	—	September 8, 2013	La Sagra	OAM	·	2.3 km	MPC · JPL
879226	2013 SG_{14}	—	September 16, 2013	Mount Lemmon	Mount Lemmon Survey	·	820 m	MPC · JPL
879227	2013 SR_{17}	—	March 6, 2006	Kitt Peak	Spacewatch	·	2.4 km	MPC · JPL
879228	2013 SY_{17}	—	September 9, 2013	Haleakala	Pan-STARRS 1	NYS	760 m	MPC · JPL
879229	2013 SA_{18}	—	September 2, 2013	Mount Lemmon	Mount Lemmon Survey	·	2.1 km	MPC · JPL
879230	2013 SB_{23}	—	September 13, 2013	Kitt Peak	Spacewatch	·	740 m	MPC · JPL
879231	2013 SF_{24}	—	August 29, 2013	Haleakala	Pan-STARRS 1	·	320 m	MPC · JPL
879232	2013 SL_{30}	—	September 29, 2013	Catalina	CSS	AMO	480 m	MPC · JPL
879233	2013 SH_{32}	—	September 1, 2013	Mount Lemmon	Mount Lemmon Survey	·	2.3 km	MPC · JPL
879234	2013 SV_{34}	—	September 18, 2009	Mount Lemmon	Mount Lemmon Survey	·	690 m	MPC · JPL
879235	2013 SD_{44}	—	August 18, 2009	Kitt Peak	Spacewatch	·	940 m	MPC · JPL
879236	2013 SV_{47}	—	September 28, 2013	Kitt Peak	Spacewatch	·	2.4 km	MPC · JPL
879237	2013 SW_{47}	—	September 28, 2013	Kitt Peak	Spacewatch	LIX	2.2 km	MPC · JPL
879238	2013 SZ_{47}	—	September 28, 2013	Kitt Peak	Spacewatch	·	860 m	MPC · JPL
879239	2013 SC_{48}	—	September 28, 2013	Kitt Peak	Spacewatch	·	1.8 km	MPC · JPL
879240	2013 SQ_{49}	—	November 9, 2009	Catalina	CSS	·	740 m	MPC · JPL
879241	2013 SD_{56}	—	September 19, 2001	Sacramento Peak	SDSS	·	620 m	MPC · JPL
879242	2013 SL_{68}	—	September 24, 2013	Mount Lemmon	Mount Lemmon Survey	·	2.3 km	MPC · JPL
879243	2013 SF_{73}	—	September 10, 2013	Haleakala	Pan-STARRS 1	·	2.2 km	MPC · JPL
879244	2013 SV_{73}	—	September 6, 2013	Mount Lemmon	Mount Lemmon Survey	THM	1.8 km	MPC · JPL
879245	2013 SM_{75}	—	September 25, 2013	Mount Lemmon	Mount Lemmon Survey	·	500 m	MPC · JPL
879246	2013 SY_{81}	—	September 29, 2013	Haleakala	Pan-STARRS 1	·	2.4 km	MPC · JPL
879247	2013 SW_{89}	—	October 30, 2008	Kitt Peak	Spacewatch	·	1.7 km	MPC · JPL
879248	2013 SZ_{90}	—	September 2, 2013	Mount Lemmon	Mount Lemmon Survey	·	2.1 km	MPC · JPL
879249	2013 SZ_{102}	—	September 23, 2013	Mount Lemmon	Mount Lemmon Survey	·	880 m	MPC · JPL
879250	2013 SB_{104}	—	September 28, 2013	Mount Lemmon	Mount Lemmon Survey	·	750 m	MPC · JPL
879251	2013 SZ_{104}	—	September 25, 2013	Mount Lemmon	Mount Lemmon Survey	·	1.9 km	MPC · JPL
879252	2013 SQ_{105}	—	September 29, 2013	Drebach	~Knöfel, A.	·	1.8 km	MPC · JPL
879253	2013 SZ_{105}	—	September 29, 2013	Mount Lemmon	Mount Lemmon Survey	·	1.2 km	MPC · JPL
879254	2013 SW_{106}	—	September 16, 2013	Mount Lemmon	Mount Lemmon Survey	·	1.9 km	MPC · JPL
879255	2013 SE_{108}	—	September 17, 2013	Mount Lemmon	Mount Lemmon Survey	·	1.9 km	MPC · JPL
879256	2013 SY_{108}	—	September 16, 2013	Mount Lemmon	Mount Lemmon Survey	·	720 m	MPC · JPL
879257	2013 SX_{113}	—	September 17, 2013	Mount Lemmon	Mount Lemmon Survey	·	2.1 km	MPC · JPL
879258	2013 SZ_{113}	—	September 26, 2013	Mount Lemmon	Mount Lemmon Survey	·	1.5 km	MPC · JPL
879259	2013 TN	—	October 1, 2013	Kitt Peak	Spacewatch	·	560 m	MPC · JPL
879260	2013 TM_{1}	—	September 9, 2007	Kitt Peak	Spacewatch	·	2.1 km	MPC · JPL
879261	2013 TM_{6}	—	October 5, 2013	Mount Lemmon	Mount Lemmon Survey	·	950 m	MPC · JPL
879262	2013 TB_{8}	—	October 4, 2013	Mount Lemmon	Mount Lemmon Survey	·	2.0 km	MPC · JPL
879263	2013 TO_{8}	—	September 29, 2013	Palomar	Palomar Transient Factory	·	2.1 km	MPC · JPL
879264	2013 TY_{15}	—	September 30, 2013	Mount Lemmon	Mount Lemmon Survey	·	1.8 km	MPC · JPL
879265	2013 TE_{19}	—	September 2, 2013	Catalina	CSS	·	950 m	MPC · JPL
879266	2013 TN_{19}	—	October 1, 2013	Mount Lemmon	Mount Lemmon Survey	(895)	1.6 km	MPC · JPL
879267	2013 TU_{27}	—	September 15, 2013	Mount Lemmon	Mount Lemmon Survey	T_{j} (2.99) · EUP	2.2 km	MPC · JPL
879268	2013 TK_{32}	—	October 2, 2013	Kitt Peak	Spacewatch	·	550 m	MPC · JPL
879269	2013 TU_{35}	—	November 10, 2009	Mount Lemmon	Mount Lemmon Survey	·	930 m	MPC · JPL
879270	2013 TB_{41}	—	September 4, 2013	Catalina	CSS	·	1.1 km	MPC · JPL
879271	2013 TV_{41}	—	October 2, 2013	Mount Lemmon	Mount Lemmon Survey	·	620 m	MPC · JPL
879272	2013 TT_{42}	—	October 3, 2013	Kitt Peak	Spacewatch	·	2.3 km	MPC · JPL
879273	2013 TY_{52}	—	October 4, 2013	Kitt Peak	Spacewatch	·	640 m	MPC · JPL
879274	2013 TA_{56}	—	October 4, 2013	Mount Lemmon	Mount Lemmon Survey	·	2.4 km	MPC · JPL
879275	2013 TB_{58}	—	October 4, 2013	Mount Lemmon	Mount Lemmon Survey	·	440 m	MPC · JPL
879276	2013 TQ_{65}	—	September 28, 2013	Catalina	CSS	·	1.2 km	MPC · JPL
879277	2013 TE_{69}	—	August 27, 2013	Haleakala	Pan-STARRS 1	·	570 m	MPC · JPL
879278	2013 TD_{74}	—	October 3, 2013	Kitt Peak	Spacewatch	·	840 m	MPC · JPL
879279	2013 TY_{76}	—	October 3, 2013	Catalina	CSS	·	2.5 km	MPC · JPL
879280	2013 TV_{77}	—	October 5, 2013	Haleakala	Pan-STARRS 1	·	870 m	MPC · JPL
879281	2013 TS_{83}	—	October 1, 2013	Kitt Peak	Spacewatch	·	810 m	MPC · JPL
879282	2013 TF_{93}	—	May 16, 2012	Mount Lemmon	Mount Lemmon Survey	·	1.3 km	MPC · JPL
879283	2013 TC_{104}	—	May 12, 2012	Mount Lemmon	Mount Lemmon Survey	T_{j} (2.97)	2.1 km	MPC · JPL
879284	2013 TY_{110}	—	November 19, 2009	Kitt Peak	Spacewatch	(5)	730 m	MPC · JPL
879285	2013 TG_{117}	—	October 4, 2013	Mount Lemmon	Mount Lemmon Survey	·	1.9 km	MPC · JPL
879286	2013 TJ_{120}	—	September 25, 2013	Catalina	CSS	THB	2.4 km	MPC · JPL
879287	2013 TE_{128}	—	October 5, 2013	Cerro Tololo-LCO B	Lister, T.	T_{j} (2.99)	1.9 km	MPC · JPL
879288	2013 TA_{140}	—	October 1, 2013	Mount Lemmon	Mount Lemmon Survey	·	1.7 km	MPC · JPL
879289	2013 TN_{149}	—	October 5, 2013	Kitt Peak	Research and Education Collaborative Occultation Network	·	1.7 km	MPC · JPL
879290	2013 TW_{157}	—	November 1, 2013	Mount Lemmon	Mount Lemmon Survey	·	2.1 km	MPC · JPL
879291	2013 TM_{159}	—	October 3, 2013	Haleakala	Pan-STARRS 1	·	190 km	MPC · JPL
879292	2013 TM_{162}	—	September 15, 2007	Mount Lemmon	Mount Lemmon Survey	·	1.8 km	MPC · JPL
879293	2013 TO_{164}	—	October 3, 2013	Haleakala	Pan-STARRS 1	·	1.7 km	MPC · JPL
879294	2013 TE_{166}	—	October 2, 2013	Haleakala	Pan-STARRS 1	·	1.8 km	MPC · JPL
879295	2013 TN_{168}	—	October 3, 2013	Haleakala	Pan-STARRS 1	·	1.8 km	MPC · JPL
879296	2013 TG_{169}	—	October 5, 2013	Haleakala	Pan-STARRS 1	·	1.8 km	MPC · JPL
879297	2013 TK_{173}	—	October 3, 2013	Haleakala	Pan-STARRS 1	·	660 m	MPC · JPL
879298	2013 TS_{173}	—	October 4, 2013	Haleakala	Pan-STARRS 1	·	810 m	MPC · JPL
879299	2013 TX_{174}	—	October 3, 2013	Haleakala	Pan-STARRS 1	·	440 m	MPC · JPL
879300	2013 TE_{175}	—	October 3, 2013	Kitt Peak	Spacewatch	(194) · critical	720 m	MPC · JPL

== 879301–879400 ==
back to top

Designation			Discovery			Properties		Ref
Permanent	Provisional	Named after	Date	Site	Discoverer(s)	Category	Diam.	Ref
879301	2013 TS_{175}	—	October 1, 2013	Kitt Peak	Spacewatch	·	680 m	MPC · JPL
879302	2013 TV_{175}	—	October 24, 2009	Kitt Peak	Spacewatch	·	610 m	MPC · JPL
879303	2013 TQ_{176}	—	October 6, 2013	Mount Lemmon	Mount Lemmon Survey	critical	710 m	MPC · JPL
879304	2013 TR_{176}	—	October 4, 2013	Mount Lemmon	Mount Lemmon Survey	·	850 m	MPC · JPL
879305	2013 TQ_{177}	—	October 3, 2013	Kitt Peak	Spacewatch	TIR	2.4 km	MPC · JPL
879306	2013 TT_{177}	—	October 9, 2013	Mount Lemmon	Mount Lemmon Survey	·	760 m	MPC · JPL
879307	2013 TX_{177}	—	October 9, 2013	Mount Lemmon	Mount Lemmon Survey	BRG	960 m	MPC · JPL
879308	2013 TF_{178}	—	October 13, 2013	Mount Lemmon	Mount Lemmon Survey	·	1.2 km	MPC · JPL
879309	2013 TK_{178}	—	October 3, 2013	Kitt Peak	Spacewatch	·	630 m	MPC · JPL
879310	2013 TU_{179}	—	September 19, 2009	Kitt Peak	Spacewatch	·	470 m	MPC · JPL
879311	2013 TZ_{179}	—	October 9, 2013	Kitt Peak	Spacewatch	·	620 m	MPC · JPL
879312	2013 TF_{180}	—	October 24, 2009	Kitt Peak	Spacewatch	·	460 m	MPC · JPL
879313	2013 TM_{180}	—	October 5, 2013	Haleakala	Pan-STARRS 1	(5)	720 m	MPC · JPL
879314	2013 TF_{181}	—	October 2, 2013	Kitt Peak	Spacewatch	·	1.1 km	MPC · JPL
879315	2013 TM_{182}	—	October 1, 2013	Catalina	CSS	·	2.0 km	MPC · JPL
879316	2013 TP_{182}	—	September 25, 2013	Mount Lemmon	Mount Lemmon Survey	·	2.3 km	MPC · JPL
879317	2013 TV_{183}	—	October 2, 2013	Haleakala	Pan-STARRS 1	·	2.1 km	MPC · JPL
879318	2013 TP_{184}	—	March 12, 2016	Haleakala	Pan-STARRS 1	·	2.1 km	MPC · JPL
879319	2013 TU_{184}	—	October 5, 2013	Haleakala	Pan-STARRS 1	·	1.6 km	MPC · JPL
879320	2013 TL_{185}	—	October 2, 2013	Kitt Peak	Spacewatch	·	1.3 km	MPC · JPL
879321	2013 TV_{188}	—	October 4, 2013	Kitt Peak	Spacewatch	(5)	670 m	MPC · JPL
879322	2013 TW_{190}	—	July 10, 2018	Haleakala	Pan-STARRS 1	·	2.1 km	MPC · JPL
879323	2013 TS_{197}	—	October 6, 2013	Catalina	CSS	·	1.9 km	MPC · JPL
879324	2013 TK_{199}	—	October 5, 2013	Haleakala	Pan-STARRS 1	L5	6.5 km	MPC · JPL
879325	2013 TX_{199}	—	October 12, 2013	Kitt Peak	Spacewatch	·	1.7 km	MPC · JPL
879326	2013 TF_{200}	—	October 14, 2013	Mount Lemmon	Mount Lemmon Survey	LIX	2.3 km	MPC · JPL
879327	2013 TU_{202}	—	October 3, 2013	Haleakala	Pan-STARRS 1	·	810 m	MPC · JPL
879328	2013 TQ_{206}	—	October 3, 2013	Catalina	CSS	·	2.0 km	MPC · JPL
879329	2013 TN_{210}	—	October 5, 2013	Mount Lemmon	Mount Lemmon Survey	HYG	1.6 km	MPC · JPL
879330	2013 TQ_{210}	—	October 2, 2013	Mount Lemmon	Mount Lemmon Survey	·	2.9 km	MPC · JPL
879331	2013 TY_{211}	—	October 9, 2013	Mount Lemmon	Mount Lemmon Survey	·	1.0 km	MPC · JPL
879332	2013 TR_{216}	—	October 7, 2013	Mount Lemmon	Mount Lemmon Survey	·	2.4 km	MPC · JPL
879333	2013 TD_{220}	—	October 1, 2013	Mount Lemmon	Mount Lemmon Survey	(31811)	1.9 km	MPC · JPL
879334	2013 TF_{224}	—	October 5, 2013	Haleakala	Pan-STARRS 1	L5	5.9 km	MPC · JPL
879335	2013 TR_{224}	—	October 3, 2013	Haleakala	Pan-STARRS 1	MAR	490 m	MPC · JPL
879336	2013 TZ_{225}	—	October 2, 2013	Kitt Peak	Spacewatch	·	1.3 km	MPC · JPL
879337	2013 TE_{226}	—	October 5, 2013	Haleakala	Pan-STARRS 1	·	1.8 km	MPC · JPL
879338	2013 TT_{229}	—	October 3, 2013	Mount Lemmon	Mount Lemmon Survey	·	880 m	MPC · JPL
879339	2013 TZ_{230}	—	October 5, 2013	Haleakala	Pan-STARRS 1	·	480 m	MPC · JPL
879340	2013 TB_{231}	—	October 2, 2013	Haleakala	Pan-STARRS 1	·	580 m	MPC · JPL
879341	2013 TY_{231}	—	October 1, 2013	Mount Lemmon	Mount Lemmon Survey	·	510 m	MPC · JPL
879342	2013 TT_{232}	—	October 2, 2013	Haleakala	Pan-STARRS 1	·	1.9 km	MPC · JPL
879343	2013 TX_{232}	—	October 12, 2013	Kitt Peak	Spacewatch	·	2.5 km	MPC · JPL
879344	2013 TP_{233}	—	October 7, 2013	Mount Lemmon	Mount Lemmon Survey	·	2.3 km	MPC · JPL
879345	2013 TF_{235}	—	October 2, 2013	Haleakala	Pan-STARRS 1	·	1.9 km	MPC · JPL
879346	2013 TE_{236}	—	October 5, 2013	Mount Lemmon	Mount Lemmon Survey	·	2.1 km	MPC · JPL
879347	2013 TZ_{248}	—	October 12, 2013	Catalina	CSS	T_{j} (2.99)	2.1 km	MPC · JPL
879348	2013 TV_{252}	—	October 3, 2013	Haleakala	Pan-STARRS 1	·	1.8 km	MPC · JPL
879349	2013 TH_{275}	—	October 9, 2013	Kislovodsk	ISON-Kislovodsk Observatory	·	2.2 km	MPC · JPL
879350	2013 TS_{279}	—	October 15, 2013	Kitt Peak	Spacewatch	·	2.2 km	MPC · JPL
879351	2013 TW_{279}	—	October 9, 2013	Mount Lemmon	Mount Lemmon Survey	L5	5.9 km	MPC · JPL
879352	2013 UD_{2}	—	October 23, 2013	Kitt Peak	Spacewatch	·	330 m	MPC · JPL
879353	2013 UL_{3}	—	October 23, 2013	Haleakala	Pan-STARRS 1	H	450 m	MPC · JPL
879354	2013 UJ_{24}	—	October 24, 2013	Kitt Peak	Spacewatch	·	700 m	MPC · JPL
879355	2013 UF_{27}	—	October 25, 2013	Mount Lemmon	Mount Lemmon Survey	HNS	650 m	MPC · JPL
879356	2013 UH_{27}	—	October 28, 2013	Mount Lemmon	Mount Lemmon Survey	·	640 m	MPC · JPL
879357	2013 UN_{30}	—	October 24, 2013	Mount Lemmon	Mount Lemmon Survey	·	510 m	MPC · JPL
879358	2013 UU_{31}	—	October 25, 2013	Mount Lemmon	Mount Lemmon Survey	·	2.2 km	MPC · JPL
879359	2013 UF_{36}	—	October 24, 2013	Mount Lemmon	Mount Lemmon Survey	·	2.7 km	MPC · JPL
879360	2013 UG_{36}	—	October 24, 2013	Mount Lemmon	Mount Lemmon Survey	L5	6.5 km	MPC · JPL
879361	2013 UA_{44}	—	October 31, 2013	Mount Lemmon	Mount Lemmon Survey	L5	6.8 km	MPC · JPL
879362	2013 UB_{45}	—	October 30, 2013	Kitt Peak	Spacewatch	EUN	960 m	MPC · JPL
879363	2013 UM_{45}	—	October 26, 2013	Mount Lemmon	Mount Lemmon Survey	PHO	730 m	MPC · JPL
879364	2013 UE_{46}	—	October 24, 2013	Mount Lemmon	Mount Lemmon Survey	L5	6.2 km	MPC · JPL
879365	2013 UN_{46}	—	October 23, 2013	Mount Lemmon	Mount Lemmon Survey	·	1.7 km	MPC · JPL
879366	2013 UA_{53}	—	October 24, 2013	Kitt Peak	Spacewatch	·	1.8 km	MPC · JPL
879367	2013 UW_{57}	—	October 28, 2013	Mount Lemmon	Mount Lemmon Survey	·	1.9 km	MPC · JPL
879368	2013 UX_{57}	—	October 28, 2013	Mount Lemmon	Mount Lemmon Survey	L5	5.2 km	MPC · JPL
879369	2013 UO_{63}	—	October 25, 2013	Kitt Peak	Spacewatch	critical	1.6 km	MPC · JPL
879370	2013 VZ_{2}	—	October 2, 2013	Kitt Peak	Spacewatch	critical	790 m	MPC · JPL
879371	2013 VA_{6}	—	September 12, 2013	Mount Lemmon	Mount Lemmon Survey	·	2.1 km	MPC · JPL
879372	2013 VG_{12}	—	September 28, 2013	Mount Lemmon	Mount Lemmon Survey	·	830 m	MPC · JPL
879373	2013 VY_{15}	—	April 1, 2005	Kitt Peak	Spacewatch	EOS	1.7 km	MPC · JPL
879374	2013 VL_{17}	—	November 2, 2013	Catalina	CSS	·	650 m	MPC · JPL
879375	2013 VT_{17}	—	September 3, 2007	Catalina	CSS	·	1.8 km	MPC · JPL
879376	2013 VY_{26}	—	November 1, 2013	Mount Lemmon	Mount Lemmon Survey	THM	1.7 km	MPC · JPL
879377	2013 VW_{27}	—	November 2, 2013	Mount Lemmon	Mount Lemmon Survey	·	2.3 km	MPC · JPL
879378	2013 VO_{32}	—	November 14, 2013	Mount Lemmon	Mount Lemmon Survey	·	810 m	MPC · JPL
879379	2013 VE_{33}	—	November 12, 2013	Mount Lemmon	Mount Lemmon Survey	·	700 m	MPC · JPL
879380	2013 VE_{34}	—	November 10, 2013	Mount Lemmon	Mount Lemmon Survey	·	1.1 km	MPC · JPL
879381	2013 VM_{34}	—	November 2, 2013	Mount Lemmon	Mount Lemmon Survey	BRG	1.1 km	MPC · JPL
879382	2013 VQ_{34}	—	November 6, 2013	Haleakala	Pan-STARRS 1	·	680 m	MPC · JPL
879383	2013 VS_{34}	—	November 11, 2013	Kitt Peak	Spacewatch	·	580 m	MPC · JPL
879384	2013 VC_{35}	—	November 9, 2013	Mount Lemmon	Mount Lemmon Survey	·	620 m	MPC · JPL
879385	2013 VD_{36}	—	November 9, 2013	Haleakala	Pan-STARRS 1	·	860 m	MPC · JPL
879386	2013 VT_{36}	—	November 1, 2013	Kitt Peak	Spacewatch	·	700 m	MPC · JPL
879387	2013 VA_{37}	—	November 2, 2013	Mount Lemmon	Mount Lemmon Survey	(5)	550 m	MPC · JPL
879388	2013 VB_{37}	—	November 9, 2013	Haleakala	Pan-STARRS 1	·	360 m	MPC · JPL
879389	2013 VJ_{37}	—	November 9, 2013	Kitt Peak	Spacewatch	·	810 m	MPC · JPL
879390	2013 VH_{38}	—	November 9, 2013	Mount Lemmon	Mount Lemmon Survey	·	450 m	MPC · JPL
879391	2013 VR_{39}	—	November 12, 2013	Kitt Peak	Spacewatch	(5)	700 m	MPC · JPL
879392	2013 VX_{39}	—	November 2, 2013	Kitt Peak	Spacewatch	MAR	630 m	MPC · JPL
879393	2013 VG_{41}	—	November 14, 2013	Mount Lemmon	Mount Lemmon Survey	KON	1.4 km	MPC · JPL
879394	2013 VT_{42}	—	November 1, 2013	Mount Lemmon	Mount Lemmon Survey	·	2.4 km	MPC · JPL
879395	2013 VF_{44}	—	November 9, 2013	Haleakala	Pan-STARRS 1	(5)	710 m	MPC · JPL
879396	2013 VW_{44}	—	November 9, 2013	Kitt Peak	Spacewatch	·	560 m	MPC · JPL
879397	2013 VL_{45}	—	November 6, 2013	Haleakala	Pan-STARRS 1	·	1.4 km	MPC · JPL
879398	2013 VC_{46}	—	November 6, 2013	Haleakala	Pan-STARRS 1	·	1.4 km	MPC · JPL
879399	2013 VM_{47}	—	November 10, 2013	Kitt Peak	Spacewatch	T_{j} (2.99) · EUP	1.9 km	MPC · JPL
879400	2013 VE_{49}	—	November 6, 2013	Haleakala	Pan-STARRS 1	·	730 m	MPC · JPL

== 879401–879500 ==
back to top

Designation			Discovery			Properties		Ref
Permanent	Provisional	Named after	Date	Site	Discoverer(s)	Category	Diam.	Ref
879401	2013 VK_{50}	—	October 30, 2013	Wildberg	R. Apitzsch	·	2.2 km	MPC · JPL
879402	2013 VM_{50}	—	November 6, 2013	Haleakala	Pan-STARRS 1	·	1.2 km	MPC · JPL
879403	2013 VP_{60}	—	November 11, 2013	Catalina	CSS	·	470 m	MPC · JPL
879404	2013 VH_{61}	—	November 10, 2013	Kitt Peak	Spacewatch	·	2.5 km	MPC · JPL
879405	2013 VD_{66}	—	November 9, 2013	Haleakala	Pan-STARRS 1	·	2.1 km	MPC · JPL
879406	2013 VZ_{72}	—	November 9, 2013	Haleakala	Pan-STARRS 1	·	710 m	MPC · JPL
879407	2013 VE_{73}	—	November 10, 2013	Mount Lemmon	Mount Lemmon Survey	·	820 m	MPC · JPL
879408	2013 VV_{73}	—	November 9, 2013	Haleakala	Pan-STARRS 1	·	730 m	MPC · JPL
879409	2013 VW_{73}	—	November 9, 2013	Haleakala	Pan-STARRS 1	·	690 m	MPC · JPL
879410	2013 VH_{74}	—	November 9, 2013	Haleakala	Pan-STARRS 1	·	2.1 km	MPC · JPL
879411	2013 VC_{75}	—	November 6, 2013	Haleakala	Pan-STARRS 1	·	2.3 km	MPC · JPL
879412	2013 VT_{78}	—	November 12, 2013	Kitt Peak	Spacewatch	L5	6.9 km	MPC · JPL
879413	2013 VV_{78}	—	November 9, 2013	Haleakala	Pan-STARRS 1	·	1.5 km	MPC · JPL
879414	2013 VZ_{83}	—	November 9, 2013	Kitt Peak	Spacewatch	·	2.1 km	MPC · JPL
879415	2013 VH_{95}	—	November 9, 2013	Mount Lemmon	Mount Lemmon Survey	L5	5.9 km	MPC · JPL
879416	2013 WC_{1}	—	October 28, 2013	Mount Lemmon	Mount Lemmon Survey	·	2.4 km	MPC · JPL
879417	2013 WT_{5}	—	November 24, 2013	Haleakala	Pan-STARRS 1	·	410 m	MPC · JPL
879418	2013 WA_{12}	—	November 6, 2013	Haleakala	Pan-STARRS 1	·	1.9 km	MPC · JPL
879419	2013 WS_{20}	—	November 27, 2013	Haleakala	Pan-STARRS 1	KON	1.5 km	MPC · JPL
879420	2013 WE_{22}	—	October 25, 2013	Kitt Peak	Spacewatch	·	870 m	MPC · JPL
879421	2013 WE_{24}	—	November 6, 2013	Haleakala	Pan-STARRS 1	·	1.0 km	MPC · JPL
879422	2013 WP_{34}	—	October 7, 2013	Mount Lemmon	Mount Lemmon Survey	·	530 m	MPC · JPL
879423	2013 WY_{39}	—	November 28, 2013	Kitt Peak	Spacewatch	·	490 m	MPC · JPL
879424	2013 WP_{41}	—	November 28, 2013	Mount Lemmon	Mount Lemmon Survey	·	800 m	MPC · JPL
879425	2013 WY_{41}	—	October 26, 2013	Mount Lemmon	Mount Lemmon Survey	T_{j} (2.99)	1.4 km	MPC · JPL
879426	2013 WW_{44}	—	November 27, 2013	Haleakala	Pan-STARRS 1	APO	280 m	MPC · JPL
879427	2013 WO_{48}	—	November 11, 2013	Mount Lemmon	Mount Lemmon Survey	·	800 m	MPC · JPL
879428	2013 WH_{49}	—	November 25, 2013	Haleakala	Pan-STARRS 1	·	970 m	MPC · JPL
879429	2013 WQ_{51}	—	November 25, 2013	Haleakala	Pan-STARRS 1	T_{j} (2.98) · EUP	2.4 km	MPC · JPL
879430	2013 WW_{51}	—	November 25, 2013	Haleakala	Pan-STARRS 1	·	2.4 km	MPC · JPL
879431	2013 WJ_{52}	—	November 25, 2013	Haleakala	Pan-STARRS 1	·	840 m	MPC · JPL
879432	2013 WP_{58}	—	November 4, 2005	Mount Lemmon	Mount Lemmon Survey	·	650 m	MPC · JPL
879433	2013 WX_{66}	—	November 28, 2013	Haleakala	Pan-STARRS 1	·	830 m	MPC · JPL
879434	2013 WO_{73}	—	October 10, 2007	Kitt Peak	Spacewatch	HYG	1.9 km	MPC · JPL
879435	2013 WR_{74}	—	November 26, 2013	Haleakala	Pan-STARRS 1	·	780 m	MPC · JPL
879436	2013 WD_{75}	—	November 8, 2013	Mount Lemmon	Mount Lemmon Survey	·	720 m	MPC · JPL
879437	2013 WN_{76}	—	October 9, 2013	Mount Lemmon	Mount Lemmon Survey	·	520 m	MPC · JPL
879438	2013 WM_{79}	—	November 26, 2013	Mount Lemmon	Mount Lemmon Survey	critical	580 m	MPC · JPL
879439	2013 WG_{82}	—	November 26, 2013	Mount Lemmon	Mount Lemmon Survey	·	670 m	MPC · JPL
879440	2013 WV_{87}	—	December 2, 2005	Kitt Peak	Spacewatch	·	750 m	MPC · JPL
879441	2013 WW_{93}	—	November 2, 2013	Mount Lemmon	Mount Lemmon Survey	(5)	910 m	MPC · JPL
879442	2013 WR_{114}	—	November 28, 2013	Haleakala	Pan-STARRS 1	EUN	870 m	MPC · JPL
879443	2013 WH_{115}	—	November 27, 2013	Haleakala	Pan-STARRS 1	·	640 m	MPC · JPL
879444	2013 WR_{115}	—	November 28, 2013	Mount Lemmon	Mount Lemmon Survey	(5)	580 m	MPC · JPL
879445	2013 WT_{115}	—	November 27, 2013	Haleakala	Pan-STARRS 1	·	740 m	MPC · JPL
879446	2013 WU_{115}	—	November 29, 2013	Haleakala	Pan-STARRS 1	KON	1.5 km	MPC · JPL
879447	2013 WG_{116}	—	November 24, 2013	Haleakala	Pan-STARRS 1	·	820 m	MPC · JPL
879448	2013 WE_{117}	—	November 27, 2013	Haleakala	Pan-STARRS 1	·	690 m	MPC · JPL
879449	2013 WM_{117}	—	November 27, 2013	Haleakala	Pan-STARRS 1	·	640 m	MPC · JPL
879450	2013 WG_{118}	—	November 28, 2013	Mount Lemmon	Mount Lemmon Survey	·	880 m	MPC · JPL
879451	2013 WC_{119}	—	December 22, 2005	Needville	Dillon, W. G.	·	720 m	MPC · JPL
879452	2013 WN_{119}	—	November 26, 2013	Mount Lemmon	Mount Lemmon Survey	·	2.5 km	MPC · JPL
879453	2013 WQ_{121}	—	November 25, 2013	Haleakala	Pan-STARRS 1	·	1.5 km	MPC · JPL
879454	2013 WN_{122}	—	November 27, 2013	Haleakala	Pan-STARRS 1	·	700 m	MPC · JPL
879455	2013 WR_{122}	—	November 28, 2013	Haleakala	Pan-STARRS 1	·	900 m	MPC · JPL
879456	2013 WO_{124}	—	November 28, 2013	Mount Lemmon	Mount Lemmon Survey	·	2.0 km	MPC · JPL
879457	2013 WA_{129}	—	November 29, 2013	Haleakala	Pan-STARRS 1	·	2.1 km	MPC · JPL
879458	2013 WP_{132}	—	November 28, 2013	Mount Lemmon	Mount Lemmon Survey	·	640 m	MPC · JPL
879459	2013 WH_{135}	—	November 27, 2013	Haleakala	Pan-STARRS 1	·	2.1 km	MPC · JPL
879460	2013 WL_{135}	—	November 28, 2013	Haleakala	Pan-STARRS 1	·	1.6 km	MPC · JPL
879461	2013 WG_{137}	—	November 28, 2013	Mount Lemmon	Mount Lemmon Survey	EUP	2.4 km	MPC · JPL
879462	2013 WD_{139}	—	November 28, 2013	Mount Lemmon	Mount Lemmon Survey	·	980 m	MPC · JPL
879463	2013 WV_{139}	—	November 28, 2013	Mount Lemmon	Mount Lemmon Survey	(5)	780 m	MPC · JPL
879464	2013 WQ_{140}	—	November 28, 2013	Kitt Peak	Spacewatch	·	870 m	MPC · JPL
879465	2013 WF_{148}	—	November 24, 2013	Haleakala	Pan-STARRS 1	·	2.4 km	MPC · JPL
879466	2013 XV_{1}	—	October 9, 2013	Mount Lemmon	Mount Lemmon Survey	·	700 m	MPC · JPL
879467	2013 XY_{4}	—	December 2, 2013	Mount Lemmon	Mount Lemmon Survey	·	700 m	MPC · JPL
879468	2013 XS_{7}	—	December 4, 2013	Piszkés-tető	K. Sárneczky, P. Székely	·	1.4 km	MPC · JPL
879469	2013 XG_{13}	—	November 28, 2013	Mount Lemmon	Mount Lemmon Survey	·	1.0 km	MPC · JPL
879470	2013 XO_{28}	—	December 8, 2013	Tincana	Zolnowski, M., Kusiak, M.	·	980 m	MPC · JPL
879471	2013 XT_{28}	—	December 11, 2013	Haleakala	Pan-STARRS 1	·	1 km	MPC · JPL
879472	2013 XX_{28}	—	December 4, 2013	Haleakala	Pan-STARRS 1	·	720 m	MPC · JPL
879473	2013 XK_{31}	—	December 7, 2013	Mount Lemmon	Mount Lemmon Survey	·	660 m	MPC · JPL
879474	2013 XP_{31}	—	December 10, 2013	Mount Lemmon	Mount Lemmon Survey	EUN	590 m	MPC · JPL
879475	2013 XB_{32}	—	December 11, 2013	Haleakala	Pan-STARRS 1	H	410 m	MPC · JPL
879476	2013 XG_{34}	—	December 7, 2013	Haleakala	Pan-STARRS 1	T_{j} (2.99) · EUP	2.7 km	MPC · JPL
879477	2013 XO_{34}	—	December 7, 2013	Haleakala	Pan-STARRS 1	·	2.5 km	MPC · JPL
879478	2013 XB_{36}	—	December 11, 2013	Haleakala	Pan-STARRS 1	THM	1.6 km	MPC · JPL
879479	2013 XS_{37}	—	December 7, 2013	Haleakala	Pan-STARRS 1	·	1.9 km	MPC · JPL
879480	2013 XT_{40}	—	December 6, 2013	Haleakala	Pan-STARRS 1	·	880 m	MPC · JPL
879481	2013 XX_{40}	—	December 11, 2013	Haleakala	Pan-STARRS 1	·	760 m	MPC · JPL
879482	2013 XW_{41}	—	December 6, 2013	Haleakala	Pan-STARRS 1	EUN	940 m	MPC · JPL
879483	2013 XS_{42}	—	December 11, 2013	Haleakala	Pan-STARRS 1	·	1.5 km	MPC · JPL
879484	2013 YS_{1}	—	December 23, 2013	Mount Lemmon	Mount Lemmon Survey	(5)	990 m	MPC · JPL
879485	2013 YS_{5}	—	May 5, 2010	Catalina	CSS	·	1.5 km	MPC · JPL
879486	2013 YB_{17}	—	December 14, 2013	Mount Lemmon	Mount Lemmon Survey	·	790 m	MPC · JPL
879487	2013 YD_{17}	—	December 24, 2013	Mount Lemmon	Mount Lemmon Survey	·	1.0 km	MPC · JPL
879488	2013 YW_{17}	—	January 6, 2010	Kitt Peak	Spacewatch	·	910 m	MPC · JPL
879489	2013 YH_{20}	—	December 25, 2013	Haleakala	Pan-STARRS 1	·	1.2 km	MPC · JPL
879490	2013 YV_{26}	—	December 23, 2013	Mount Lemmon	Mount Lemmon Survey	RAF	550 m	MPC · JPL
879491	2013 YQ_{28}	—	December 23, 2013	Mount Lemmon	Mount Lemmon Survey	·	930 m	MPC · JPL
879492	2013 YW_{34}	—	December 18, 2009	Kitt Peak	Spacewatch	·	1.0 km	MPC · JPL
879493	2013 YE_{35}	—	November 19, 2009	Mount Lemmon	Mount Lemmon Survey	·	710 m	MPC · JPL
879494	2013 YO_{35}	—	October 30, 2002	Sacramento Peak	SDSS	·	2.0 km	MPC · JPL
879495	2013 YW_{36}	—	December 27, 2013	Mount Lemmon	Mount Lemmon Survey	·	880 m	MPC · JPL
879496	2013 YB_{43}	—	February 21, 2001	Sacramento Peak	SDSS	MIS	2.7 km	MPC · JPL
879497	2013 YY_{44}	—	January 8, 2010	Kitt Peak	Spacewatch	·	1.4 km	MPC · JPL
879498	2013 YH_{54}	—	November 27, 2013	Haleakala	Pan-STARRS 1	THB	2.0 km	MPC · JPL
879499	2013 YJ_{60}	—	December 27, 2013	Kitt Peak	Spacewatch	·	910 m	MPC · JPL
879500	2013 YO_{61}	—	December 27, 2013	Kitt Peak	Spacewatch	·	1.0 km	MPC · JPL

== 879501–879600 ==
back to top

Designation			Discovery			Properties		Ref
Permanent	Provisional	Named after	Date	Site	Discoverer(s)	Category	Diam.	Ref
879501	2013 YW_{63}	—	December 27, 2013	Kitt Peak	Spacewatch	·	720 m	MPC · JPL
879502	2013 YA_{65}	—	December 4, 2013	Haleakala	Pan-STARRS 1	·	1.1 km	MPC · JPL
879503	2013 YA_{68}	—	December 30, 2013	Mount Lemmon	Mount Lemmon Survey	·	800 m	MPC · JPL
879504	2013 YW_{69}	—	December 11, 2013	Mount Lemmon	Mount Lemmon Survey	·	950 m	MPC · JPL
879505	2013 YG_{75}	—	December 31, 2008	Kitt Peak	Spacewatch	·	1.3 km	MPC · JPL
879506	2013 YD_{77}	—	December 27, 2013	Kitt Peak	Spacewatch	·	740 m	MPC · JPL
879507	2013 YT_{85}	—	December 28, 2013	Kitt Peak	Spacewatch	·	730 m	MPC · JPL
879508	2013 YB_{93}	—	December 30, 2013	Kitt Peak	Spacewatch	·	660 m	MPC · JPL
879509	2013 YF_{108}	—	November 28, 2013	Mount Lemmon	Mount Lemmon Survey	EUP	2.7 km	MPC · JPL
879510	2013 YG_{108}	—	December 10, 2009	Mount Lemmon	Mount Lemmon Survey	·	700 m	MPC · JPL
879511	2013 YL_{111}	—	February 9, 2010	Catalina	CSS	·	740 m	MPC · JPL
879512	2013 YH_{117}	—	December 30, 2013	Mount Lemmon	Mount Lemmon Survey	·	1.1 km	MPC · JPL
879513	2013 YD_{121}	—	January 2, 2006	Mount Lemmon	Mount Lemmon Survey	·	1.0 km	MPC · JPL
879514	2013 YO_{123}	—	February 9, 2010	Kitt Peak	Spacewatch	·	860 m	MPC · JPL
879515	2013 YA_{124}	—	December 30, 2013	Kitt Peak	Spacewatch	·	980 m	MPC · JPL
879516	2013 YF_{127}	—	December 31, 2013	Mount Lemmon	Mount Lemmon Survey	·	920 m	MPC · JPL
879517	2013 YA_{131}	—	December 31, 2013	Mount Lemmon	Mount Lemmon Survey	·	960 m	MPC · JPL
879518	2013 YP_{132}	—	December 31, 2013	Mount Lemmon	Mount Lemmon Survey	EOS	1.1 km	MPC · JPL
879519	2013 YV_{135}	—	December 31, 2013	Mount Lemmon	Mount Lemmon Survey	EUN	790 m	MPC · JPL
879520	2013 YE_{140}	—	December 3, 2013	Haleakala	Pan-STARRS 1	·	990 m	MPC · JPL
879521	2013 YZ_{147}	—	December 31, 2013	Haleakala	Pan-STARRS 1	(116763)	1.6 km	MPC · JPL
879522	2013 YZ_{156}	—	December 28, 2013	Mount Lemmon	Mount Lemmon Survey	·	710 m	MPC · JPL
879523	2013 YE_{160}	—	December 25, 2013	Mount Lemmon	Mount Lemmon Survey	·	1.2 km	MPC · JPL
879524	2013 YR_{161}	—	December 23, 2013	Mount Lemmon	Mount Lemmon Survey	·	1.3 km	MPC · JPL
879525	2013 YL_{169}	—	December 23, 2013	Mount Lemmon	Mount Lemmon Survey	(5)	890 m	MPC · JPL
879526	2013 YQ_{169}	—	December 31, 2013	Mount Lemmon	Mount Lemmon Survey	·	1.2 km	MPC · JPL
879527	2013 YV_{169}	—	December 30, 2013	Haleakala	Pan-STARRS 1	·	1.0 km	MPC · JPL
879528	2014 AJ_{1}	—	October 28, 2013	Mount Lemmon	Mount Lemmon Survey	·	820 m	MPC · JPL
879529	2014 AY_{1}	—	January 1, 2014	Haleakala	Pan-STARRS 1	EMA	1.7 km	MPC · JPL
879530	2014 AZ_{1}	—	January 1, 2014	Haleakala	Pan-STARRS 1	EOS	1.5 km	MPC · JPL
879531	2014 AG_{7}	—	January 1, 2014	Haleakala	Pan-STARRS 1	(5)	880 m	MPC · JPL
879532	2014 AL_{13}	—	January 8, 2010	Mount Lemmon	Mount Lemmon Survey	·	830 m	MPC · JPL
879533	2014 AP_{17}	—	June 22, 2006	Kitt Peak	Spacewatch	·	4.6 km	MPC · JPL
879534	2014 AJ_{18}	—	January 1, 2014	Haleakala	Pan-STARRS 1	·	870 m	MPC · JPL
879535	2014 AE_{19}	—	January 1, 2014	Haleakala	Pan-STARRS 1	·	910 m	MPC · JPL
879536	2014 AQ_{42}	—	December 23, 2013	Mount Lemmon	Mount Lemmon Survey	·	600 m	MPC · JPL
879537	2014 AF_{51}	—	January 10, 2014	Mount Lemmon	Mount Lemmon Survey	AMO · PHA	290 m	MPC · JPL
879538	2014 AG_{52}	—	December 30, 2013	Catalina	CSS	·	2.5 km	MPC · JPL
879539	2014 AZ_{53}	—	February 10, 2010	Kitt Peak	Spacewatch	KON	1.6 km	MPC · JPL
879540	2014 AQ_{59}	—	January 9, 2014	Kitt Peak	Spacewatch	·	980 m	MPC · JPL
879541	2014 AM_{60}	—	January 5, 2014	La Silla	La Silla	·	1.2 km	MPC · JPL
879542	2014 AD_{62}	—	January 3, 2014	Mount Lemmon	Mount Lemmon Survey	(5)	900 m	MPC · JPL
879543	2014 AZ_{62}	—	February 18, 2015	Haleakala	Pan-STARRS 1	·	960 m	MPC · JPL
879544	2014 AS_{63}	—	January 2, 2014	Mount Lemmon	Mount Lemmon Survey	·	1.3 km	MPC · JPL
879545	2014 AB_{64}	—	January 7, 2014	Mount Lemmon	Mount Lemmon Survey	·	900 m	MPC · JPL
879546	2014 AE_{66}	—	January 11, 2014	Kitt Peak	Spacewatch	JUN	700 m	MPC · JPL
879547	2014 AW_{66}	—	January 1, 2014	Haleakala	Pan-STARRS 1	EUN	760 m	MPC · JPL
879548	2014 AC_{69}	—	January 1, 2014	Kitt Peak	Spacewatch	EUP	2.6 km	MPC · JPL
879549	2014 AR_{69}	—	January 9, 2014	Mount Lemmon	Mount Lemmon Survey	·	1.5 km	MPC · JPL
879550	2014 AO_{75}	—	December 24, 2013	Mount Lemmon	Mount Lemmon Survey	(5)	880 m	MPC · JPL
879551	2014 AW_{76}	—	January 1, 2014	Haleakala	Pan-STARRS 1	·	780 m	MPC · JPL
879552	2014 BY	—	December 1, 2013	XuYi	PMO NEO Survey Program	T_{j} (2.91)	2.2 km	MPC · JPL
879553	2014 BT_{2}	—	January 11, 2010	Kitt Peak	Spacewatch	(5)	830 m	MPC · JPL
879554	2014 BZ_{5}	—	February 18, 2010	Kitt Peak	Spacewatch	·	970 m	MPC · JPL
879555	2014 BM_{7}	—	January 26, 2006	Mount Lemmon	Mount Lemmon Survey	·	520 m	MPC · JPL
879556	2014 BD_{14}	—	January 9, 2014	Kitt Peak	Spacewatch	·	1.1 km	MPC · JPL
879557	2014 BP_{15}	—	January 23, 2014	Mount Lemmon	Mount Lemmon Survey	EUN	620 m	MPC · JPL
879558	2014 BL_{16}	—	January 23, 2014	Mount Lemmon	Mount Lemmon Survey	·	870 m	MPC · JPL
879559	2014 BZ_{20}	—	January 7, 2014	Mount Lemmon	Mount Lemmon Survey	·	680 m	MPC · JPL
879560	2014 BG_{22}	—	November 28, 2013	Mount Lemmon	Mount Lemmon Survey	·	970 m	MPC · JPL
879561	2014 BS_{23}	—	January 24, 2014	Haleakala	Pan-STARRS 1	·	1.1 km	MPC · JPL
879562	2014 BR_{27}	—	December 23, 2013	Mount Lemmon	Mount Lemmon Survey	HNS	900 m	MPC · JPL
879563	2014 BR_{44}	—	February 17, 2010	Kitt Peak	Spacewatch	·	1.0 km	MPC · JPL
879564	2014 BO_{51}	—	January 2, 2014	Kitt Peak	Spacewatch	·	1.0 km	MPC · JPL
879565	2014 BW_{51}	—	January 1, 2014	Haleakala	Pan-STARRS 1	·	810 m	MPC · JPL
879566	2014 BN_{62}	—	October 22, 1976	Mount Ontake	H. Kosai, K. Furukawa	·	1.4 km	MPC · JPL
879567	2014 BJ_{65}	—	January 28, 2014	Kitt Peak	Spacewatch	·	800 m	MPC · JPL
879568	2014 BM_{70}	—	January 29, 2014	Catalina	CSS	·	1.0 km	MPC · JPL
879569	2014 BY_{70}	—	January 28, 2014	Mount Lemmon	Mount Lemmon Survey	·	930 m	MPC · JPL
879570	2014 BD_{71}	—	January 28, 2014	Mayhill-ISON	L. Elenin	·	810 m	MPC · JPL
879571	2014 BU_{72}	—	January 1, 2014	Mount Lemmon	Mount Lemmon Survey	·	910 m	MPC · JPL
879572	2014 BQ_{75}	—	January 28, 2014	Kitt Peak	Spacewatch	KON	1.6 km	MPC · JPL
879573	2014 BF_{76}	—	January 29, 2014	Catalina	CSS	·	2.0 km	MPC · JPL
879574	2014 BR_{76}	—	January 30, 2014	Kitt Peak	Spacewatch	·	690 m	MPC · JPL
879575	2014 BB_{87}	—	January 25, 2014	Haleakala	Pan-STARRS 1	·	900 m	MPC · JPL
879576	2014 BG_{87}	—	January 29, 2014	Catalina	CSS	·	1.0 km	MPC · JPL
879577	2014 BF_{89}	—	October 9, 2012	Haleakala	Pan-STARRS 1	·	1.0 km	MPC · JPL
879578	2014 BO_{89}	—	January 24, 2014	Haleakala	Pan-STARRS 1	EUN	910 m	MPC · JPL
879579	2014 BU_{90}	—	January 24, 2014	Haleakala	Pan-STARRS 1	·	1.0 km	MPC · JPL
879580	2014 CD_{3}	—	February 6, 2014	Mount Lemmon	Mount Lemmon Survey	·	410 m	MPC · JPL
879581	2014 CU_{9}	—	November 28, 2013	Mount Lemmon	Mount Lemmon Survey	·	680 m	MPC · JPL
879582	2014 CB_{28}	—	February 10, 2014	Haleakala	Pan-STARRS 1	·	1.1 km	MPC · JPL
879583	2014 CK_{28}	—	February 10, 2014	Haleakala	Pan-STARRS 1	·	690 m	MPC · JPL
879584	2014 CO_{28}	—	February 10, 2014	Haleakala	Pan-STARRS 1	·	1.0 km	MPC · JPL
879585	2014 CR_{28}	—	February 10, 2014	Haleakala	Pan-STARRS 1	·	1.6 km	MPC · JPL
879586	2014 CC_{29}	—	February 10, 2014	Haleakala	Pan-STARRS 1	HNS	770 m	MPC · JPL
879587	2014 CD_{29}	—	February 6, 2014	Kitt Peak	Spacewatch	·	3.3 km	MPC · JPL
879588	2014 CM_{29}	—	February 9, 2014	Haleakala	Pan-STARRS 1	·	880 m	MPC · JPL
879589	2014 CQ_{29}	—	February 11, 2014	Mount Lemmon	Mount Lemmon Survey	·	740 m	MPC · JPL
879590	2014 CR_{30}	—	February 5, 2014	Mount Lemmon	Mount Lemmon Survey	·	2.4 km	MPC · JPL
879591	2014 CU_{30}	—	February 9, 2014	Mount Lemmon	Mount Lemmon Survey	·	1.2 km	MPC · JPL
879592	2014 CJ_{33}	—	February 6, 2014	Mount Lemmon	Mount Lemmon Survey	·	710 m	MPC · JPL
879593	2014 CV_{34}	—	February 11, 2014	Mount Lemmon	Mount Lemmon Survey	·	500 m	MPC · JPL
879594	2014 CW_{35}	—	February 6, 2014	Catalina	CSS	·	1.2 km	MPC · JPL
879595	2014 DG_{3}	—	January 28, 2014	Kitt Peak	Spacewatch	·	830 m	MPC · JPL
879596	2014 DP_{17}	—	February 22, 2014	Haleakala	Pan-STARRS 1	·	1.0 km	MPC · JPL
879597	2014 DN_{20}	—	October 25, 2012	Mount Lemmon	Mount Lemmon Survey	JUN	800 m	MPC · JPL
879598	2014 DM_{22}	—	February 22, 2014	Mount Lemmon	Mount Lemmon Survey	APO · PHA	570 m	MPC · JPL
879599	2014 DB_{23}	—	February 9, 2014	Mount Lemmon	Mount Lemmon Survey	H	360 m	MPC · JPL
879600	2014 DW_{27}	—	January 11, 2010	Kitt Peak	Spacewatch	·	650 m	MPC · JPL

== 879601–879700 ==
back to top

Designation			Discovery			Properties		Ref
Permanent	Provisional	Named after	Date	Site	Discoverer(s)	Category	Diam.	Ref
879601	2014 DU_{74}	—	April 9, 2010	Mount Lemmon	Mount Lemmon Survey	·	1.0 km	MPC · JPL
879602	2014 DW_{83}	—	February 25, 2014	Kitt Peak	Spacewatch	HNS	760 m	MPC · JPL
879603	2014 DR_{87}	—	February 26, 2014	Mount Lemmon	Mount Lemmon Survey	·	700 m	MPC · JPL
879604	2014 DJ_{101}	—	September 26, 2008	Kitt Peak	Spacewatch	·	930 m	MPC · JPL
879605	2014 DE_{112}	—	December 29, 2013	Haleakala	Pan-STARRS 1	BAR	940 m	MPC · JPL
879606	2014 DE_{113}	—	February 28, 2014	Haleakala	Pan-STARRS 1	·	760 m	MPC · JPL
879607	2014 DJ_{115}	—	February 26, 2014	Mount Lemmon	Mount Lemmon Survey	·	460 m	MPC · JPL
879608	2014 DT_{118}	—	March 13, 2010	Mount Lemmon	Mount Lemmon Survey	·	940 m	MPC · JPL
879609	2014 DE_{125}	—	February 28, 2014	Mount Lemmon	Mount Lemmon Survey	H	290 m	MPC · JPL
879610	2014 DB_{131}	—	February 9, 2014	Haleakala	Pan-STARRS 1	·	840 m	MPC · JPL
879611	2014 DJ_{135}	—	February 25, 2014	Kitt Peak	Spacewatch	ADE	1.2 km	MPC · JPL
879612	2014 DL_{152}	—	April 15, 2010	Mount Lemmon	Mount Lemmon Survey	·	1.0 km	MPC · JPL
879613	2014 DH_{158}	—	September 19, 2008	Kitt Peak	Spacewatch	·	840 m	MPC · JPL
879614	2014 DP_{158}	—	February 26, 2014	Haleakala	Pan-STARRS 1	EUN	790 m	MPC · JPL
879615	2014 DS_{158}	—	February 27, 2014	Haleakala	Pan-STARRS 1	HNS	740 m	MPC · JPL
879616	2014 DM_{159}	—	February 24, 2014	Haleakala	Pan-STARRS 1	·	1.2 km	MPC · JPL
879617	2014 DS_{159}	—	February 26, 2014	Mount Lemmon	Mount Lemmon Survey	·	1.2 km	MPC · JPL
879618	2014 DC_{160}	—	February 26, 2014	Haleakala	Pan-STARRS 1	·	1.3 km	MPC · JPL
879619	2014 DP_{160}	—	February 28, 2014	Haleakala	Pan-STARRS 1	·	790 m	MPC · JPL
879620	2014 DA_{161}	—	February 26, 2014	Haleakala	Pan-STARRS 1	·	940 m	MPC · JPL
879621	2014 DZ_{162}	—	February 24, 2014	Haleakala	Pan-STARRS 1	·	970 m	MPC · JPL
879622	2014 DS_{163}	—	February 28, 2014	Haleakala	Pan-STARRS 1	(5)	870 m	MPC · JPL
879623	2014 DF_{164}	—	February 28, 2014	Haleakala	Pan-STARRS 1	·	970 m	MPC · JPL
879624	2014 DR_{165}	—	February 26, 2014	Haleakala	Pan-STARRS 1	·	1.6 km	MPC · JPL
879625	2014 DX_{165}	—	February 27, 2014	Mount Lemmon	Mount Lemmon Survey	·	1.2 km	MPC · JPL
879626	2014 DZ_{165}	—	February 28, 2014	Haleakala	Pan-STARRS 1	·	1.5 km	MPC · JPL
879627	2014 DF_{166}	—	February 23, 2014	Haleakala	Pan-STARRS 1	·	1.9 km	MPC · JPL
879628	2014 DD_{168}	—	February 26, 2014	Mount Lemmon	Mount Lemmon Survey	KON	1.5 km	MPC · JPL
879629	2014 DX_{177}	—	February 26, 2014	Haleakala	Pan-STARRS 1	·	1.1 km	MPC · JPL
879630	2014 DB_{180}	—	February 28, 2014	Haleakala	Pan-STARRS 1	MAR	710 m	MPC · JPL
879631	2014 DV_{180}	—	February 28, 2014	Haleakala	Pan-STARRS 1	·	1.0 km	MPC · JPL
879632	2014 DL_{186}	—	February 25, 2014	Haleakala	Pan-STARRS 1	JUN	750 m	MPC · JPL
879633	2014 DD_{189}	—	February 28, 2014	Haleakala	Pan-STARRS 1	·	840 m	MPC · JPL
879634	2014 EQ_{3}	—	March 5, 2014	Haleakala	Pan-STARRS 1	·	1.2 km	MPC · JPL
879635	2014 ET_{9}	—	February 22, 2014	Kitt Peak	Spacewatch	·	880 m	MPC · JPL
879636	2014 ET_{13}	—	February 20, 2014	Kitt Peak	Spacewatch	·	840 m	MPC · JPL
879637	2014 ED_{18}	—	February 25, 2014	Kitt Peak	Spacewatch	·	710 m	MPC · JPL
879638	2014 EK_{22}	—	February 28, 2014	Haleakala	Pan-STARRS 1	·	440 m	MPC · JPL
879639	2014 ER_{24}	—	March 10, 2014	Mount Lemmon	Mount Lemmon Survey	H	350 m	MPC · JPL
879640	2014 EK_{25}	—	February 11, 2014	Mount Lemmon	Mount Lemmon Survey	H	410 m	MPC · JPL
879641	2014 EJ_{27}	—	February 10, 2014	Haleakala	Pan-STARRS 1	·	1.2 km	MPC · JPL
879642	2014 EX_{35}	—	February 26, 2014	Haleakala	Pan-STARRS 1	·	980 m	MPC · JPL
879643	2014 EU_{46}	—	March 13, 2010	Mount Lemmon	Mount Lemmon Survey	·	920 m	MPC · JPL
879644	2014 EF_{52}	—	March 11, 2014	Mount Lemmon	Mount Lemmon Survey	·	1.9 km	MPC · JPL
879645	2014 ER_{56}	—	February 28, 2014	Haleakala	Pan-STARRS 1	·	600 m	MPC · JPL
879646	2014 EW_{58}	—	October 5, 1996	Kitt Peak	Spacewatch	·	790 m	MPC · JPL
879647	2014 EC_{67}	—	February 28, 2014	Haleakala	Pan-STARRS 1	·	1.3 km	MPC · JPL
879648	2014 EW_{67}	—	February 9, 2014	Haleakala	Pan-STARRS 1	·	740 m	MPC · JPL
879649	2014 EJ_{68}	—	September 20, 2011	Haleakala	Pan-STARRS 1	·	1.8 km	MPC · JPL
879650	2014 EO_{68}	—	February 28, 2014	Haleakala	Pan-STARRS 1	L4	5.9 km	MPC · JPL
879651	2014 EV_{68}	—	October 25, 2016	Haleakala	Pan-STARRS 1	·	1.4 km	MPC · JPL
879652	2014 EF_{70}	—	September 20, 2011	Mount Lemmon	Mount Lemmon Survey	MRX	750 m	MPC · JPL
879653	2014 ER_{70}	—	September 20, 2011	Haleakala	Pan-STARRS 1	·	1.8 km	MPC · JPL
879654	2014 EF_{81}	—	March 2, 2014	Cerro Tololo	High Cadence Transient Survey	(5)	710 m	MPC · JPL
879655	2014 ED_{86}	—	July 11, 2016	Haleakala	Pan-STARRS 1	·	840 m	MPC · JPL
879656	2014 EZ_{91}	—	April 10, 2010	Mount Lemmon	Mount Lemmon Survey	·	850 m	MPC · JPL
879657	2014 EW_{101}	—	August 10, 2016	Haleakala	Pan-STARRS 1	·	1.2 km	MPC · JPL
879658	2014 EG_{104}	—	March 3, 2014	Cerro Tololo	High Cadence Transient Survey	(5)	830 m	MPC · JPL
879659	2014 EG_{124}	—	November 1, 2008	Kitt Peak	Spacewatch	·	880 m	MPC · JPL
879660	2014 EV_{129}	—	March 3, 2014	Cerro Tololo	High Cadence Transient Survey	·	1.2 km	MPC · JPL
879661	2014 ES_{135}	—	March 3, 2014	Cerro Tololo	High Cadence Transient Survey	·	1.1 km	MPC · JPL
879662	2014 EB_{143}	—	July 14, 2016	Haleakala	Pan-STARRS 1	·	2.0 km	MPC · JPL
879663	2014 ES_{149}	—	February 26, 2014	Haleakala	Pan-STARRS 1	·	840 m	MPC · JPL
879664	2014 EJ_{152}	—	September 25, 2016	Mount Lemmon	Mount Lemmon Survey	·	1.5 km	MPC · JPL
879665	2014 ES_{152}	—	March 4, 2014	Cerro Tololo	High Cadence Transient Survey	·	1.4 km	MPC · JPL
879666	2014 ED_{166}	—	March 4, 2014	Cerro Tololo	High Cadence Transient Survey	·	650 m	MPC · JPL
879667	2014 EK_{175}	—	March 4, 2014	Cerro Tololo	High Cadence Transient Survey	·	1.0 km	MPC · JPL
879668	2014 ED_{193}	—	September 17, 2017	Haleakala	Pan-STARRS 1	·	1.5 km	MPC · JPL
879669	2014 EA_{200}	—	October 15, 2012	Mount Lemmon	Mount Lemmon Survey	·	650 m	MPC · JPL
879670	2014 EH_{209}	—	February 28, 2014	Haleakala	Pan-STARRS 1	·	1.1 km	MPC · JPL
879671	2014 EP_{209}	—	April 18, 2015	Cerro Tololo	DECam	T_{j} (2.97) · 3:2	4.5 km	MPC · JPL
879672	2014 EY_{210}	—	February 28, 2014	Haleakala	Pan-STARRS 1	·	1.7 km	MPC · JPL
879673	2014 ET_{218}	—	April 6, 2014	Mount Lemmon	Mount Lemmon Survey	·	1.5 km	MPC · JPL
879674	2014 ER_{228}	—	March 5, 2014	Cerro Tololo	High Cadence Transient Survey	·	750 m	MPC · JPL
879675	2014 EC_{236}	—	February 28, 2014	Haleakala	Pan-STARRS 1	DOR	1.4 km	MPC · JPL
879676	2014 EF_{236}	—	September 6, 2008	Mount Lemmon	Mount Lemmon Survey	MAS	560 m	MPC · JPL
879677	2014 EP_{244}	—	September 30, 2017	Mount Lemmon	Mount Lemmon Survey	TIR	1.8 km	MPC · JPL
879678	2014 EN_{246}	—	September 24, 2008	Kitt Peak	Spacewatch	(5)	700 m	MPC · JPL
879679	2014 EA_{252}	—	March 10, 2014	Mount Lemmon	Mount Lemmon Survey	·	1.1 km	MPC · JPL
879680	2014 EQ_{254}	—	March 11, 2014	Mount Lemmon	Mount Lemmon Survey	MAR	660 m	MPC · JPL
879681	2014 EW_{255}	—	March 5, 2014	Kitt Peak	Spacewatch	·	660 m	MPC · JPL
879682	2014 ED_{257}	—	March 13, 2014	Mount Lemmon	Mount Lemmon Survey	MAR	850 m	MPC · JPL
879683	2014 EO_{257}	—	March 12, 2014	Mount Lemmon	Mount Lemmon Survey	·	1.4 km	MPC · JPL
879684	2014 EF_{259}	—	March 12, 2014	Haleakala	Pan-STARRS 1	·	1.4 km	MPC · JPL
879685	2014 FO_{16}	—	February 26, 2014	Haleakala	Pan-STARRS 1	·	750 m	MPC · JPL
879686	2014 FN_{27}	—	October 26, 2008	Kitt Peak	Spacewatch	·	890 m	MPC · JPL
879687	2014 FL_{28}	—	February 9, 2014	Mount Lemmon	Mount Lemmon Survey	·	900 m	MPC · JPL
879688	2014 FU_{31}	—	February 26, 2014	Haleakala	Pan-STARRS 1	·	1.1 km	MPC · JPL
879689	2014 FS_{33}	—	April 2, 2006	Mount Lemmon	Mount Lemmon Survey	·	1.1 km	MPC · JPL
879690	2014 FM_{53}	—	April 1, 2005	Kitt Peak	Spacewatch	·	1.5 km	MPC · JPL
879691	2014 FH_{57}	—	March 31, 2014	Mount Lemmon	Mount Lemmon Survey	·	1.5 km	MPC · JPL
879692	2014 FV_{60}	—	April 1, 2014	Mount Lemmon	Mount Lemmon Survey	3:2	3.3 km	MPC · JPL
879693	2014 FK_{65}	—	October 27, 2005	Kitt Peak	Spacewatch	·	1.3 km	MPC · JPL
879694	2014 FJ_{68}	—	January 10, 2014	Haleakala	Pan-STARRS 1	·	1.1 km	MPC · JPL
879695	2014 FJ_{78}	—	March 24, 2014	Haleakala	Pan-STARRS 1	EUN	810 m	MPC · JPL
879696	2014 FR_{78}	—	March 26, 2014	Mount Lemmon	Mount Lemmon Survey	·	1.4 km	MPC · JPL
879697	2014 FK_{80}	—	March 23, 2014	Kitt Peak	Spacewatch	H	300 m	MPC · JPL
879698	2014 FH_{90}	—	March 27, 2014	Haleakala	Pan-STARRS 1	·	1.2 km	MPC · JPL
879699	2014 FE_{91}	—	November 5, 2007	Mount Lemmon	Mount Lemmon Survey	·	1.2 km	MPC · JPL
879700	2014 FF_{96}	—	May 20, 2015	Cerro Tololo	DECam	·	1.1 km	MPC · JPL

== 879701–879800 ==
back to top

Designation			Discovery			Properties		Ref
Permanent	Provisional	Named after	Date	Site	Discoverer(s)	Category	Diam.	Ref
879701	2014 GW_{4}	—	April 1, 2014	Mount Lemmon	Mount Lemmon Survey	·	740 m	MPC · JPL
879702	2014 GT_{7}	—	April 1, 2014	Mount Lemmon	Mount Lemmon Survey	·	1.3 km	MPC · JPL
879703	2014 GO_{12}	—	April 2, 2014	Mount Lemmon	Mount Lemmon Survey	·	1.5 km	MPC · JPL
879704	2014 GV_{24}	—	April 4, 2014	Mount Lemmon	Mount Lemmon Survey	·	820 m	MPC · JPL
879705	2014 GS_{25}	—	March 29, 2014	Mount Lemmon	Mount Lemmon Survey	·	900 m	MPC · JPL
879706	2014 GE_{34}	—	April 4, 2014	Haleakala	Pan-STARRS 1	·	360 m	MPC · JPL
879707	2014 GF_{47}	—	March 7, 1981	Siding Spring	S. J. Bus	EUN	1.8 km	MPC · JPL
879708	2014 GJ_{50}	—	April 5, 2014	Haleakala	Pan-STARRS 1	EUN	830 m	MPC · JPL
879709	2014 GQ_{55}	—	April 5, 2014	Haleakala	Pan-STARRS 1	·	1.0 km	MPC · JPL
879710	2014 GP_{65}	—	April 5, 2014	Haleakala	Pan-STARRS 1	·	850 m	MPC · JPL
879711	2014 GX_{65}	—	April 4, 2014	Mount Lemmon	Mount Lemmon Survey	·	1.1 km	MPC · JPL
879712	2014 GK_{66}	—	April 5, 2014	Haleakala	Pan-STARRS 1	KON	1.3 km	MPC · JPL
879713	2014 GO_{66}	—	April 8, 2014	Mount Lemmon	Mount Lemmon Survey	·	1.2 km	MPC · JPL
879714	2014 GA_{67}	—	April 5, 2014	Haleakala	Pan-STARRS 1	·	860 m	MPC · JPL
879715	2014 GF_{67}	—	April 4, 2014	Mount Lemmon	Mount Lemmon Survey	·	900 m	MPC · JPL
879716	2014 GM_{69}	—	April 5, 2014	Haleakala	Pan-STARRS 1	NYS	860 m	MPC · JPL
879717	2014 GW_{75}	—	April 9, 2014	Kitt Peak	Spacewatch	·	1.9 km	MPC · JPL
879718	2014 GE_{76}	—	April 8, 2014	Mount Lemmon	Mount Lemmon Survey	·	680 m	MPC · JPL
879719	2014 GJ_{76}	—	April 5, 2014	Haleakala	Pan-STARRS 1	·	690 m	MPC · JPL
879720	2014 GB_{79}	—	April 8, 2014	Mount Lemmon	Mount Lemmon Survey	·	1.4 km	MPC · JPL
879721	2014 GJ_{81}	—	April 5, 2014	Haleakala	Pan-STARRS 1	HNS	750 m	MPC · JPL
879722	2014 GJ_{89}	—	April 9, 2014	Haleakala	Pan-STARRS 1	JUN	770 m	MPC · JPL
879723	2014 HC	—	April 4, 2014	Haleakala	Pan-STARRS 1	RAF	640 m	MPC · JPL
879724	2014 HB_{3}	—	April 7, 2014	Mount Lemmon	Mount Lemmon Survey	H	380 m	MPC · JPL
879725	2014 HU_{4}	—	April 23, 2014	Mount Lemmon	Mount Lemmon Survey	H	360 m	MPC · JPL
879726	2014 HN_{9}	—	April 20, 2014	Mount Lemmon	Mount Lemmon Survey	·	1.5 km	MPC · JPL
879727	2014 HN_{12}	—	April 5, 2014	Haleakala	Pan-STARRS 1	·	880 m	MPC · JPL
879728	2014 HW_{15}	—	September 7, 2008	Mount Lemmon	Mount Lemmon Survey	·	560 m	MPC · JPL
879729	2014 HF_{18}	—	April 4, 2014	Haleakala	Pan-STARRS 1	·	1.4 km	MPC · JPL
879730	2014 HO_{18}	—	April 20, 2014	Mount Lemmon	Mount Lemmon Survey	·	460 m	MPC · JPL
879731	2014 HN_{19}	—	February 1, 2009	Mount Lemmon	Mount Lemmon Survey	·	1.2 km	MPC · JPL
879732	2014 HD_{21}	—	April 5, 2014	Haleakala	Pan-STARRS 1	·	1.2 km	MPC · JPL
879733	2014 HN_{23}	—	May 4, 2010	Kitt Peak	Spacewatch	·	900 m	MPC · JPL
879734	2014 HJ_{27}	—	April 4, 2014	Haleakala	Pan-STARRS 1	·	1.1 km	MPC · JPL
879735	2014 HK_{35}	—	March 29, 2014	Kitt Peak	Spacewatch	·	1.3 km	MPC · JPL
879736	2014 HH_{37}	—	April 24, 2014	Mount Lemmon	Mount Lemmon Survey	·	890 m	MPC · JPL
879737	2014 HD_{41}	—	April 24, 2014	Mount Lemmon	Mount Lemmon Survey	AGN	920 m	MPC · JPL
879738	2014 HP_{43}	—	April 24, 2014	Mount Lemmon	Mount Lemmon Survey	·	1.9 km	MPC · JPL
879739	2014 HY_{48}	—	August 27, 2011	Haleakala	Pan-STARRS 1	MAS	600 m	MPC · JPL
879740	2014 HF_{51}	—	March 31, 2014	Mount Lemmon	Mount Lemmon Survey	·	1.1 km	MPC · JPL
879741	2014 HU_{54}	—	April 23, 2014	Cerro Tololo-DECam	DECam	·	1.2 km	MPC · JPL
879742	2014 HK_{55}	—	September 28, 2011	Kitt Peak	Spacewatch	·	1.3 km	MPC · JPL
879743	2014 HV_{55}	—	April 23, 2014	Cerro Tololo-DECam	DECam	·	1.2 km	MPC · JPL
879744	2014 HP_{63}	—	April 23, 2014	Cerro Tololo-DECam	DECam	HOF	1.8 km	MPC · JPL
879745	2014 HM_{64}	—	September 25, 2012	Mount Lemmon	Mount Lemmon Survey	·	1.2 km	MPC · JPL
879746	2014 HS_{69}	—	April 5, 2014	Haleakala	Pan-STARRS 1	·	960 m	MPC · JPL
879747	2014 HB_{73}	—	July 19, 2015	Haleakala	Pan-STARRS 2	·	1.5 km	MPC · JPL
879748	2014 HA_{75}	—	November 1, 2007	Mount Lemmon	Mount Lemmon Survey	·	990 m	MPC · JPL
879749	2014 HN_{77}	—	April 23, 2014	Cerro Tololo-DECam	DECam	·	1.3 km	MPC · JPL
879750	2014 HC_{85}	—	April 4, 2014	Haleakala	Pan-STARRS 1	·	1.3 km	MPC · JPL
879751	2014 HB_{86}	—	September 10, 2016	Mount Lemmon	Mount Lemmon Survey	·	2.0 km	MPC · JPL
879752	2014 HH_{93}	—	October 25, 2016	Haleakala	Pan-STARRS 1	HNS	710 m	MPC · JPL
879753	2014 HK_{93}	—	April 23, 2014	Cerro Tololo-DECam	DECam	·	1.3 km	MPC · JPL
879754	2014 HH_{94}	—	April 23, 2014	Cerro Tololo-DECam	DECam	·	1.0 km	MPC · JPL
879755	2014 HL_{94}	—	September 6, 2015	Kitt Peak	Spacewatch	·	840 m	MPC · JPL
879756	2014 HW_{96}	—	April 23, 2014	Cerro Tololo-DECam	DECam	AGN	700 m	MPC · JPL
879757	2014 HS_{100}	—	April 20, 2014	Mount Lemmon	Mount Lemmon Survey	·	1.3 km	MPC · JPL
879758	2014 HY_{100}	—	October 23, 2012	Kitt Peak	Spacewatch	·	1.1 km	MPC · JPL
879759	2014 HD_{102}	—	April 30, 2010	WISE	WISE	·	1.9 km	MPC · JPL
879760	2014 HJ_{103}	—	April 5, 2014	Haleakala	Pan-STARRS 1	·	420 m	MPC · JPL
879761	2014 HS_{104}	—	May 11, 2010	Mount Lemmon	Mount Lemmon Survey	·	760 m	MPC · JPL
879762	2014 HL_{107}	—	April 24, 2014	Mount Lemmon	Mount Lemmon Survey	·	1.1 km	MPC · JPL
879763	2014 HH_{116}	—	April 4, 2014	Haleakala	Pan-STARRS 1	·	1.8 km	MPC · JPL
879764	2014 HJ_{118}	—	April 23, 2014	Cerro Tololo-DECam	DECam	·	1.2 km	MPC · JPL
879765	2014 HX_{118}	—	July 19, 2015	Haleakala	Pan-STARRS 1	·	1.0 km	MPC · JPL
879766	2014 HR_{119}	—	April 24, 2014	Mount Lemmon	Mount Lemmon Survey	(5)	990 m	MPC · JPL
879767	2014 HN_{126}	—	September 26, 2011	Mount Lemmon	Mount Lemmon Survey	·	1.3 km	MPC · JPL
879768	2014 HK_{133}	—	March 22, 2014	Kitt Peak	Spacewatch	·	1.0 km	MPC · JPL
879769	2014 HX_{134}	—	April 5, 2014	Haleakala	Pan-STARRS 1	AGN	790 m	MPC · JPL
879770	2014 HT_{135}	—	November 3, 2007	Kitt Peak	Spacewatch	·	1.1 km	MPC · JPL
879771	2014 HB_{137}	—	April 23, 2014	Cerro Tololo-DECam	DECam	·	1.2 km	MPC · JPL
879772	2014 HT_{138}	—	April 23, 2014	Cerro Tololo-DECam	DECam	·	1.4 km	MPC · JPL
879773	2014 HY_{142}	—	April 23, 2014	Cerro Tololo-DECam	DECam	KOR	810 m	MPC · JPL
879774	2014 HR_{149}	—	March 4, 2005	Mount Lemmon	Mount Lemmon Survey	MIS	1.9 km	MPC · JPL
879775	2014 HU_{154}	—	April 5, 2014	Haleakala	Pan-STARRS 1	·	1.4 km	MPC · JPL
879776	2014 HV_{158}	—	April 29, 2014	Haleakala	Pan-STARRS 1	·	900 m	MPC · JPL
879777	2014 HG_{168}	—	February 26, 2014	Haleakala	Pan-STARRS 1	·	800 m	MPC · JPL
879778	2014 HU_{173}	—	April 7, 2014	Kitt Peak	Spacewatch	·	810 m	MPC · JPL
879779	2014 HH_{178}	—	November 7, 2007	Catalina	CSS	H	350 m	MPC · JPL
879780	2014 HW_{190}	—	October 17, 2012	Haleakala	Pan-STARRS 1	H	280 m	MPC · JPL
879781	2014 HM_{201}	—	May 1, 2014	Mount Lemmon	Mount Lemmon Survey	EUP · critical	2.3 km	MPC · JPL
879782	2014 HA_{214}	—	April 25, 2014	Mount Lemmon	Mount Lemmon Survey	EUN	860 m	MPC · JPL
879783	2014 HM_{215}	—	April 30, 2014	Haleakala	Pan-STARRS 1	·	1.6 km	MPC · JPL
879784	2014 HF_{217}	—	April 15, 2008	Mount Lemmon	Mount Lemmon Survey	·	2.0 km	MPC · JPL
879785	2014 HV_{217}	—	April 20, 2014	Mount Lemmon	Mount Lemmon Survey	·	1.4 km	MPC · JPL
879786	2014 HP_{218}	—	April 23, 2014	Cerro Tololo-DECam	DECam	MAR	660 m	MPC · JPL
879787	2014 HJ_{219}	—	April 21, 2014	Mount Lemmon	Mount Lemmon Survey	·	810 m	MPC · JPL
879788	2014 HM_{221}	—	April 30, 2014	Haleakala	Pan-STARRS 1	·	1.2 km	MPC · JPL
879789	2014 HF_{226}	—	April 24, 2014	Haleakala	Pan-STARRS 1	·	910 m	MPC · JPL
879790	2014 HN_{228}	—	April 24, 2014	Haleakala	Pan-STARRS 1	·	500 m	MPC · JPL
879791	2014 HZ_{229}	—	April 29, 2014	Haleakala	Pan-STARRS 1	·	1.2 km	MPC · JPL
879792	2014 HX_{233}	—	April 30, 2014	Haleakala	Pan-STARRS 1	·	2.2 km	MPC · JPL
879793	2014 HK_{239}	—	April 5, 2014	Haleakala	Pan-STARRS 1	EUN	720 m	MPC · JPL
879794	2014 HY_{243}	—	April 23, 2014	Cerro Tololo	DECam	·	1.0 km	MPC · JPL
879795	2014 HW_{247}	—	April 25, 2014	Cerro Tololo-DECam	DECam	·	1.0 km	MPC · JPL
879796	2014 HZ_{247}	—	April 23, 2014	Cerro Tololo	DECam	THM	1.4 km	MPC · JPL
879797	2014 HC_{252}	—	April 28, 2014	Cerro Tololo	DECam	THB · critical	1.5 km	MPC · JPL
879798	2014 HG_{265}	—	April 29, 2014	Cerro Tololo	DECam	·	1.3 km	MPC · JPL
879799	2014 HS_{278}	—	October 8, 2007	Mount Lemmon	Mount Lemmon Survey	·	1.1 km	MPC · JPL
879800	2014 HV_{343}	—	April 28, 2014	Cerro Tololo	DECam	·	930 m	MPC · JPL

== 879801–879900 ==
back to top

Designation			Discovery			Properties		Ref
Permanent	Provisional	Named after	Date	Site	Discoverer(s)	Category	Diam.	Ref
879801	2014 HU_{347}	—	June 2, 2014	Haleakala	Pan-STARRS 1	·	990 m	MPC · JPL
879802	2014 HD_{371}	—	August 21, 2015	Haleakala	Pan-STARRS 1	·	1.2 km	MPC · JPL
879803	2014 HW_{427}	—	April 23, 2014	Cerro Tololo	DECam	·	860 m	MPC · JPL
879804	2014 HB_{429}	—	April 24, 2014	Cerro Tololo	DECam	·	1.0 km	MPC · JPL
879805	2014 HQ_{530}	—	April 29, 2014	Haleakala	Pan-STARRS 1	·	1.9 km	MPC · JPL
879806	2014 HB_{537}	—	April 23, 2014	Cerro Tololo	DECam	·	1.2 km	MPC · JPL
879807	2014 JP_{5}	—	April 4, 2014	Haleakala	Pan-STARRS 1	·	510 m	MPC · JPL
879808	2014 JM_{9}	—	May 3, 2014	Mount Lemmon	Mount Lemmon Survey	·	2.2 km	MPC · JPL
879809	2014 JC_{17}	—	April 1, 2014	Mount Lemmon	Mount Lemmon Survey	·	1.0 km	MPC · JPL
879810	2014 JT_{17}	—	April 4, 2014	Kitt Peak	Spacewatch	·	1.5 km	MPC · JPL
879811	2014 JP_{19}	—	March 28, 2014	Mount Lemmon	Mount Lemmon Survey	·	1.5 km	MPC · JPL
879812	2014 JY_{27}	—	April 6, 2014	Mount Lemmon	Mount Lemmon Survey	·	1.9 km	MPC · JPL
879813	2014 JO_{37}	—	April 30, 2014	Haleakala	Pan-STARRS 1	·	1.6 km	MPC · JPL
879814	2014 JX_{38}	—	May 4, 2014	Haleakala	Pan-STARRS 1	·	1.4 km	MPC · JPL
879815	2014 JV_{44}	—	April 29, 2014	Kitt Peak	Spacewatch	·	390 m	MPC · JPL
879816	2014 JQ_{47}	—	May 6, 2014	Haleakala	Pan-STARRS 1	·	2.3 km	MPC · JPL
879817	2014 JS_{47}	—	January 5, 2013	Mount Lemmon	Mount Lemmon Survey	·	1.0 km	MPC · JPL
879818	2014 JW_{48}	—	February 2, 2006	Kitt Peak	Spacewatch	·	1.1 km	MPC · JPL
879819	2014 JY_{48}	—	November 19, 2008	Mount Lemmon	Mount Lemmon Survey	·	880 m	MPC · JPL
879820	2014 JB_{49}	—	May 8, 2014	Haleakala	Pan-STARRS 1	·	1.2 km	MPC · JPL
879821	2014 JS_{51}	—	May 8, 2014	Haleakala	Pan-STARRS 1	·	1.0 km	MPC · JPL
879822	2014 JK_{52}	—	September 14, 2006	Kitt Peak	Spacewatch	·	1.3 km	MPC · JPL
879823	2014 JJ_{60}	—	December 6, 2012	Mount Lemmon	Mount Lemmon Survey	(5)	960 m	MPC · JPL
879824	2014 JW_{65}	—	December 8, 2012	Mount Lemmon	Mount Lemmon Survey	·	1.4 km	MPC · JPL
879825	2014 JX_{73}	—	May 8, 2014	Haleakala	Pan-STARRS 1	·	860 m	MPC · JPL
879826	2014 JG_{77}	—	March 18, 2007	Kitt Peak	Spacewatch	·	490 m	MPC · JPL
879827	2014 JF_{78}	—	April 8, 2014	Haleakala	Pan-STARRS 1	·	970 m	MPC · JPL
879828	2014 JN_{82}	—	May 4, 2014	Haleakala	Pan-STARRS 1	MIS	1.7 km	MPC · JPL
879829	2014 JV_{83}	—	May 2, 2014	Mount Lemmon	Mount Lemmon Survey	·	1.2 km	MPC · JPL
879830	2014 JA_{92}	—	December 31, 2008	Mount Lemmon	Mount Lemmon Survey	·	1.1 km	MPC · JPL
879831	2014 JU_{92}	—	May 10, 2014	Haleakala	Pan-STARRS 1	·	860 m	MPC · JPL
879832	2014 JF_{93}	—	May 4, 2014	Haleakala	Pan-STARRS 1	·	840 m	MPC · JPL
879833	2014 JS_{94}	—	May 7, 2014	Haleakala	Pan-STARRS 1	·	970 m	MPC · JPL
879834	2014 JW_{94}	—	May 7, 2014	Haleakala	Pan-STARRS 1	·	1.3 km	MPC · JPL
879835	2014 JK_{95}	—	May 4, 2014	Mount Lemmon	Mount Lemmon Survey	(5)	780 m	MPC · JPL
879836	2014 JR_{95}	—	May 7, 2014	Haleakala	Pan-STARRS 1	·	1.2 km	MPC · JPL
879837	2014 JZ_{96}	—	May 2, 2014	ESA OGS	ESA OGS	·	490 m	MPC · JPL
879838	2014 JC_{98}	—	May 4, 2014	Mount Lemmon	Mount Lemmon Survey	·	1.6 km	MPC · JPL
879839	2014 JU_{100}	—	May 7, 2014	Haleakala	Pan-STARRS 1	EUN	860 m	MPC · JPL
879840	2014 JK_{113}	—	September 4, 2011	Haleakala	Pan-STARRS 1	·	1.4 km	MPC · JPL
879841	2014 JP_{113}	—	May 7, 2014	Haleakala	Pan-STARRS 1	HNS	990 m	MPC · JPL
879842	2014 JS_{113}	—	May 2, 2014	Mount Lemmon	Mount Lemmon Survey	HNS	720 m	MPC · JPL
879843	2014 JZ_{113}	—	May 8, 2014	Haleakala	Pan-STARRS 1	·	1.4 km	MPC · JPL
879844	2014 JM_{114}	—	May 7, 2014	Haleakala	Pan-STARRS 1	·	1.6 km	MPC · JPL
879845	2014 JD_{115}	—	May 6, 2014	Haleakala	Pan-STARRS 1	·	2.0 km	MPC · JPL
879846	2014 JP_{118}	—	May 2, 2014	Mount Lemmon	Mount Lemmon Survey	·	650 m	MPC · JPL
879847	2014 JA_{123}	—	May 5, 2014	Mount Lemmon	Mount Lemmon Survey	·	470 m	MPC · JPL
879848	2014 JF_{129}	—	May 8, 2014	Haleakala	Pan-STARRS 1	·	1.5 km	MPC · JPL
879849	2014 KP_{6}	—	April 5, 2014	Haleakala	Pan-STARRS 1	HNS	720 m	MPC · JPL
879850	2014 KE_{9}	—	May 20, 2014	Haleakala	Pan-STARRS 1	·	1.6 km	MPC · JPL
879851	2014 KS_{28}	—	February 6, 2006	Kitt Peak	Spacewatch	·	820 m	MPC · JPL
879852	2014 KB_{31}	—	April 25, 2014	Mount Lemmon	Mount Lemmon Survey	·	1.2 km	MPC · JPL
879853	2014 KE_{38}	—	April 8, 2014	Mount Lemmon	Mount Lemmon Survey	·	1.3 km	MPC · JPL
879854	2014 KP_{38}	—	April 26, 2014	Mount Lemmon	Mount Lemmon Survey	H	400 m	MPC · JPL
879855	2014 KW_{39}	—	May 21, 2014	Haleakala	Pan-STARRS 1	H	300 m	MPC · JPL
879856	2014 KO_{42}	—	February 28, 2014	Haleakala	Pan-STARRS 1	·	1.5 km	MPC · JPL
879857	2014 KG_{45}	—	May 24, 2014	Haleakala	Pan-STARRS 1	H	350 m	MPC · JPL
879858	2014 KC_{53}	—	May 7, 2014	Haleakala	Pan-STARRS 1	EUN	900 m	MPC · JPL
879859	2014 KL_{54}	—	March 20, 2001	Kitt Peak	Spacewatch	·	810 m	MPC · JPL
879860	2014 KX_{57}	—	May 7, 2014	Haleakala	Pan-STARRS 1	·	1.2 km	MPC · JPL
879861	2014 KS_{89}	—	May 28, 2014	Haleakala	Pan-STARRS 1	GAL	1.5 km	MPC · JPL
879862	2014 KJ_{90}	—	May 30, 2014	Mount Lemmon	Mount Lemmon Survey	·	1.2 km	MPC · JPL
879863	2014 KC_{91}	—	February 21, 2001	Sacramento Peak	SDSS	L4	10 km	MPC · JPL
879864	2014 KE_{91}	—	May 30, 2014	Mount Lemmon	Mount Lemmon Survey	AMO +1km	800 m	MPC · JPL
879865	2014 KZ_{98}	—	February 28, 2014	Haleakala	Pan-STARRS 1	JUN	920 m	MPC · JPL
879866	2014 KU_{100}	—	May 24, 2014	Haleakala	Pan-STARRS 1	H	380 m	MPC · JPL
879867	2014 KS_{102}	—	May 25, 2014	Haleakala	Pan-STARRS 1	H	430 m	MPC · JPL
879868	2014 KM_{103}	—	May 23, 2014	Haleakala	Pan-STARRS 1	·	1.0 km	MPC · JPL
879869	2014 KO_{103}	—	May 23, 2014	Haleakala	Pan-STARRS 1	·	1.4 km	MPC · JPL
879870	2014 KF_{111}	—	May 25, 2014	Haleakala	Pan-STARRS 1	TIN	770 m	MPC · JPL
879871	2014 KP_{116}	—	May 20, 2014	Haleakala	Pan-STARRS 1	·	1.5 km	MPC · JPL
879872	2014 KV_{127}	—	May 26, 2014	Haleakala	Pan-STARRS 1	·	1.5 km	MPC · JPL
879873	2014 KC_{143}	—	May 21, 2014	Haleakala	Pan-STARRS 1	·	1.3 km	MPC · JPL
879874	2014 KH_{161}	—	October 25, 2011	Kitt Peak	Spacewatch	·	1.2 km	MPC · JPL
879875	2014 LH_{22}	—	May 7, 2014	Haleakala	Pan-STARRS 1	·	880 m	MPC · JPL
879876	2014 LK_{22}	—	May 2, 2014	Mount Lemmon	Mount Lemmon Survey	·	950 m	MPC · JPL
879877	2014 LG_{24}	—	June 6, 2014	Haleakala	Pan-STARRS 1	WAT	1.2 km	MPC · JPL
879878	2014 ME_{10}	—	June 21, 2014	Mount Lemmon	Mount Lemmon Survey	·	1.3 km	MPC · JPL
879879	2014 MJ_{21}	—	June 23, 2014	Mount Lemmon	Mount Lemmon Survey	KON	1.8 km	MPC · JPL
879880	2014 MN_{27}	—	February 2, 2005	Palomar	NEAT	·	1.5 km	MPC · JPL
879881	2014 MZ_{35}	—	May 26, 2014	Haleakala	Pan-STARRS 1	JUN	780 m	MPC · JPL
879882	2014 MU_{57}	—	November 23, 2006	Mount Lemmon	Mount Lemmon Survey	·	900 m	MPC · JPL
879883	2014 ML_{58}	—	October 26, 2011	Haleakala	Pan-STARRS 1	·	520 m	MPC · JPL
879884	2014 MK_{61}	—	June 26, 2014	Haleakala	Pan-STARRS 1	·	580 m	MPC · JPL
879885	2014 MR_{70}	—	June 24, 2014	Haleakala	Pan-STARRS 1	H	350 m	MPC · JPL
879886	2014 MP_{74}	—	June 22, 2014	Haleakala	Pan-STARRS 1	·	1.5 km	MPC · JPL
879887	2014 MV_{74}	—	November 7, 2010	Mount Lemmon	Mount Lemmon Survey	·	1.4 km	MPC · JPL
879888	2014 MS_{79}	—	June 16, 2014	Mount Lemmon	Mount Lemmon Survey	·	1.1 km	MPC · JPL
879889	2014 MT_{79}	—	June 24, 2014	Mount Lemmon	Mount Lemmon Survey	·	550 m	MPC · JPL
879890	2014 MU_{79}	—	June 30, 2014	Haleakala	Pan-STARRS 1	·	580 m	MPC · JPL
879891	2014 MA_{84}	—	June 30, 2014	Haleakala	Pan-STARRS 1	·	1.6 km	MPC · JPL
879892	2014 MS_{86}	—	June 24, 2014	Mount Lemmon	Mount Lemmon Survey	·	1.1 km	MPC · JPL
879893	2014 ML_{89}	—	October 27, 2011	Mount Lemmon	Mount Lemmon Survey	·	490 m	MPC · JPL
879894	2014 MR_{92}	—	June 27, 2014	Haleakala	Pan-STARRS 1	EOS	1.3 km	MPC · JPL
879895	2014 MN_{94}	—	June 29, 2014	Haleakala	Pan-STARRS 1	·	1.7 km	MPC · JPL
879896	2014 ME_{97}	—	June 28, 2014	Haleakala	Pan-STARRS 1	·	1.8 km	MPC · JPL
879897	2014 MY_{99}	—	June 25, 2014	Kitt Peak	Spacewatch	H	480 m	MPC · JPL
879898	2014 NC_{18}	—	May 26, 2014	Haleakala	Pan-STARRS 1	EUN	930 m	MPC · JPL
879899	2014 NW_{25}	—	February 8, 2013	Haleakala	Pan-STARRS 1	·	1.4 km	MPC · JPL
879900	2014 NX_{36}	—	June 15, 2007	Kitt Peak	Spacewatch	·	440 m	MPC · JPL

== 879901–880000 ==
back to top

Designation			Discovery			Properties		Ref
Permanent	Provisional	Named after	Date	Site	Discoverer(s)	Category	Diam.	Ref
879901	2014 NL_{37}	—	July 2, 2014	Haleakala	Pan-STARRS 1	·	620 m	MPC · JPL
879902	2014 NP_{43}	—	July 3, 2014	Haleakala	Pan-STARRS 1	·	2.3 km	MPC · JPL
879903	2014 NV_{43}	—	June 16, 2005	Kitt Peak	Spacewatch	·	2.1 km	MPC · JPL
879904	2014 NG_{44}	—	July 3, 2014	Haleakala	Pan-STARRS 1	·	1.6 km	MPC · JPL
879905	2014 NM_{52}	—	July 1, 2014	Haleakala	Pan-STARRS 1	·	1.6 km	MPC · JPL
879906	2014 NV_{54}	—	November 11, 2009	Catalina	CSS	·	2.2 km	MPC · JPL
879907	2014 NH_{57}	—	June 28, 2014	Haleakala	Pan-STARRS 1	DOR	1.7 km	MPC · JPL
879908	2014 NW_{64}	—	July 1, 2014	Haleakala	Pan-STARRS 1	AMO	310 m	MPC · JPL
879909	2014 NA_{67}	—	July 7, 2014	Haleakala	Pan-STARRS 1	·	770 m	MPC · JPL
879910	2014 NQ_{69}	—	September 5, 2010	Mount Lemmon	Mount Lemmon Survey	ADE	1.1 km	MPC · JPL
879911	2014 NJ_{74}	—	July 2, 2014	Haleakala	Pan-STARRS 1	·	850 m	MPC · JPL
879912	2014 NW_{74}	—	July 6, 2014	Haleakala	Pan-STARRS 1	·	460 m	MPC · JPL
879913	2014 NN_{75}	—	July 7, 2014	Haleakala	Pan-STARRS 1	·	470 m	MPC · JPL
879914	2014 NC_{77}	—	July 1, 2014	Haleakala	Pan-STARRS 1	·	1.3 km	MPC · JPL
879915	2014 NO_{77}	—	July 1, 2014	Mount Lemmon	Mount Lemmon Survey	·	1.4 km	MPC · JPL
879916	2014 NZ_{80}	—	July 8, 2014	Haleakala	Pan-STARRS 1	H	330 m	MPC · JPL
879917	2014 NV_{85}	—	July 7, 2014	Haleakala	Pan-STARRS 1	·	1.7 km	MPC · JPL
879918	2014 NY_{85}	—	July 1, 2014	Haleakala	Pan-STARRS 1	·	1.8 km	MPC · JPL
879919	2014 NO_{93}	—	September 15, 2006	Kitt Peak	Spacewatch	·	770 m	MPC · JPL
879920	2014 NA_{99}	—	July 4, 2014	Haleakala	Pan-STARRS 1	·	1.9 km	MPC · JPL
879921	2014 OF_{3}	—	July 24, 2014	Tivoli	G. Lehmann, ~Knöfel, A.	·	550 m	MPC · JPL
879922	2014 OJ_{17}	—	September 19, 2006	Catalina	CSS	·	1 km	MPC · JPL
879923	2014 OK_{20}	—	May 25, 2014	Haleakala	Pan-STARRS 1	·	590 m	MPC · JPL
879924	2014 OL_{45}	—	August 22, 2004	Kitt Peak	Spacewatch	·	480 m	MPC · JPL
879925	2014 OU_{49}	—	July 3, 2014	Haleakala	Pan-STARRS 1	·	1.4 km	MPC · JPL
879926	2014 OH_{50}	—	July 25, 2014	Haleakala	Pan-STARRS 1	·	1.1 km	MPC · JPL
879927	2014 OO_{50}	—	July 25, 2014	Haleakala	Pan-STARRS 1	·	620 m	MPC · JPL
879928	2014 OH_{65}	—	June 29, 2014	Haleakala	Pan-STARRS 1	·	630 m	MPC · JPL
879929	2014 OC_{66}	—	October 2, 2005	Mount Lemmon	Mount Lemmon Survey	KOR	860 m	MPC · JPL
879930	2014 OE_{71}	—	July 25, 2014	Haleakala	Pan-STARRS 1	·	560 m	MPC · JPL
879931	2014 OB_{88}	—	July 26, 2014	Haleakala	Pan-STARRS 1	·	1.1 km	MPC · JPL
879932	2014 OL_{94}	—	July 7, 2014	Haleakala	Pan-STARRS 1	·	2.0 km	MPC · JPL
879933	2014 OQ_{94}	—	July 7, 2014	Haleakala	Pan-STARRS 1	EUN	820 m	MPC · JPL
879934	2014 OM_{95}	—	July 26, 2014	Haleakala	Pan-STARRS 1	PHO	670 m	MPC · JPL
879935	2014 OW_{95}	—	July 7, 2014	Haleakala	Pan-STARRS 1	PHO	650 m	MPC · JPL
879936	2014 OM_{97}	—	July 26, 2014	Haleakala	Pan-STARRS 1	·	1.8 km	MPC · JPL
879937	2014 OH_{98}	—	July 7, 2014	Haleakala	Pan-STARRS 1	·	740 m	MPC · JPL
879938	2014 OG_{102}	—	September 15, 2007	Kitt Peak	Spacewatch	·	590 m	MPC · JPL
879939	2014 OL_{107}	—	June 29, 2014	Haleakala	Pan-STARRS 1	critical	1.3 km	MPC · JPL
879940	2014 OM_{117}	—	February 14, 2013	Mount Lemmon	Mount Lemmon Survey	·	1.3 km	MPC · JPL
879941	2014 OZ_{118}	—	July 25, 2014	Haleakala	Pan-STARRS 1	·	1.4 km	MPC · JPL
879942	2014 OD_{130}	—	July 26, 2014	Haleakala	Pan-STARRS 1	·	870 m	MPC · JPL
879943	2014 OK_{133}	—	June 24, 2014	Roque de los Muchachos	EURONEAR	·	450 m	MPC · JPL
879944	2014 ON_{137}	—	July 27, 2014	Haleakala	Pan-STARRS 1	·	1.1 km	MPC · JPL
879945	2014 OW_{138}	—	July 4, 2014	Haleakala	Pan-STARRS 1	·	600 m	MPC · JPL
879946	2014 OB_{152}	—	July 27, 2014	Haleakala	Pan-STARRS 1	EUN	780 m	MPC · JPL
879947	2014 OV_{152}	—	July 27, 2014	Haleakala	Pan-STARRS 1	EOS	1.2 km	MPC · JPL
879948	2014 OS_{156}	—	August 28, 2005	Kitt Peak	Spacewatch	·	1.5 km	MPC · JPL
879949	2014 OT_{157}	—	June 30, 2014	Haleakala	Pan-STARRS 1	·	1.2 km	MPC · JPL
879950	2014 OE_{160}	—	August 12, 2010	Kitt Peak	Spacewatch	EUN	830 m	MPC · JPL
879951	2014 OM_{166}	—	July 27, 2014	Haleakala	Pan-STARRS 1	·	1.4 km	MPC · JPL
879952	2014 OP_{166}	—	October 22, 2006	Mount Lemmon	Mount Lemmon Survey	(5)	940 m	MPC · JPL
879953	2014 OP_{174}	—	July 27, 2014	Haleakala	Pan-STARRS 1	critical	1.2 km	MPC · JPL
879954	2014 OM_{187}	—	July 27, 2014	Haleakala	Pan-STARRS 1	·	1.4 km	MPC · JPL
879955	2014 OO_{188}	—	July 27, 2014	Haleakala	Pan-STARRS 1	·	1.3 km	MPC · JPL
879956	2014 OM_{193}	—	July 27, 2014	Haleakala	Pan-STARRS 1	·	1.7 km	MPC · JPL
879957	2014 OX_{193}	—	July 27, 2014	Haleakala	Pan-STARRS 1	V	490 m	MPC · JPL
879958	2014 OO_{194}	—	October 31, 2007	Mount Lemmon	Mount Lemmon Survey	NYS	690 m	MPC · JPL
879959	2014 OA_{198}	—	July 27, 2014	Haleakala	Pan-STARRS 1	H	440 m	MPC · JPL
879960	2014 OC_{200}	—	October 19, 2010	Mount Lemmon	Mount Lemmon Survey	AGN	890 m	MPC · JPL
879961	2014 OG_{204}	—	July 3, 2014	Haleakala	Pan-STARRS 1	·	640 m	MPC · JPL
879962	2014 OG_{228}	—	November 1, 2010	Kitt Peak	Spacewatch	·	970 m	MPC · JPL
879963	2014 OJ_{230}	—	July 27, 2014	Haleakala	Pan-STARRS 1	·	710 m	MPC · JPL
879964	2014 OD_{232}	—	July 27, 2014	Haleakala	Pan-STARRS 1	EUP	1.9 km	MPC · JPL
879965	2014 OG_{232}	—	July 27, 2014	Haleakala	Pan-STARRS 1	·	960 m	MPC · JPL
879966	2014 OJ_{239}	—	July 29, 2014	Haleakala	Pan-STARRS 1	·	1.4 km	MPC · JPL
879967	2014 OR_{258}	—	July 3, 2014	Haleakala	Pan-STARRS 1	·	1.2 km	MPC · JPL
879968	2014 OM_{268}	—	February 17, 2013	Kitt Peak	Spacewatch	·	1.5 km	MPC · JPL
879969	2014 OW_{272}	—	July 29, 2014	Haleakala	Pan-STARRS 1	·	1.5 km	MPC · JPL
879970	2014 OO_{282}	—	October 9, 1993	La Silla	E. W. Elst	·	840 m	MPC · JPL
879971	2014 OP_{282}	—	January 14, 2013	Mount Lemmon	Mount Lemmon Survey	H	310 m	MPC · JPL
879972	2014 OA_{286}	—	July 8, 2014	Haleakala	Pan-STARRS 1	·	1.5 km	MPC · JPL
879973	2014 OQ_{289}	—	July 8, 2014	Haleakala	Pan-STARRS 1	·	850 m	MPC · JPL
879974	2014 OR_{289}	—	July 8, 2014	Haleakala	Pan-STARRS 1	·	1.7 km	MPC · JPL
879975	2014 OU_{294}	—	July 29, 2014	Haleakala	Pan-STARRS 1	·	1.5 km	MPC · JPL
879976	2014 OP_{296}	—	October 18, 2009	Mount Lemmon	Mount Lemmon Survey	·	1.5 km	MPC · JPL
879977	2014 OL_{303}	—	June 2, 2014	Haleakala	Pan-STARRS 1	·	1.4 km	MPC · JPL
879978	2014 OB_{315}	—	June 29, 2014	Haleakala	Pan-STARRS 1	·	860 m	MPC · JPL
879979	2014 OB_{322}	—	March 3, 2009	Kitt Peak	Spacewatch	·	1.0 km	MPC · JPL
879980	2014 OZ_{325}	—	July 25, 2014	Haleakala	Pan-STARRS 1	·	1.0 km	MPC · JPL
879981	2014 OK_{335}	—	June 24, 2014	Haleakala	Pan-STARRS 1	·	1.6 km	MPC · JPL
879982	2014 OV_{337}	—	July 25, 2014	Haleakala	Pan-STARRS 1	·	390 m	MPC · JPL
879983	2014 ON_{338}	—	June 29, 2014	Haleakala	Pan-STARRS 1	H	350 m	MPC · JPL
879984	2014 OX_{355}	—	July 3, 2014	Haleakala	Pan-STARRS 1	·	580 m	MPC · JPL
879985	2014 OU_{358}	—	October 25, 2011	Haleakala	Pan-STARRS 1	·	530 m	MPC · JPL
879986	2014 ON_{365}	—	July 27, 2014	Haleakala	Pan-STARRS 1	·	870 m	MPC · JPL
879987	2014 OQ_{366}	—	October 5, 2007	Kitt Peak	Spacewatch	T_{j} (2.99) · 3:2	3.0 km	MPC · JPL
879988	2014 OZ_{382}	—	June 20, 2014	Haleakala	Pan-STARRS 1	·	500 m	MPC · JPL
879989	2014 OW_{387}	—	June 27, 2014	Haleakala	Pan-STARRS 1	EUN	810 m	MPC · JPL
879990	2014 OF_{388}	—	June 29, 2014	Haleakala	Pan-STARRS 1	·	1.7 km	MPC · JPL
879991	2014 OQ_{394}	—	July 27, 2014	Haleakala	Pan-STARRS 1	·	172 km	MPC · JPL
879992	2014 OL_{398}	—	July 31, 2014	Haleakala	Pan-STARRS 1	·	2.0 km	MPC · JPL
879993	2014 OB_{409}	—	January 27, 2012	Mount Lemmon	Mount Lemmon Survey	·	1.5 km	MPC · JPL
879994	2014 OQ_{410}	—	July 4, 2014	Haleakala	Pan-STARRS 1	·	1.1 km	MPC · JPL
879995	2014 OA_{419}	—	July 29, 2014	Haleakala	Pan-STARRS 1	H	350 m	MPC · JPL
879996	2014 OU_{420}	—	July 25, 2014	Haleakala	Pan-STARRS 1	·	1.5 km	MPC · JPL
879997	2014 OQ_{423}	—	July 25, 2014	Haleakala	Pan-STARRS 1	·	1.4 km	MPC · JPL
879998	2014 OV_{423}	—	July 31, 2014	Haleakala	Pan-STARRS 1	·	1.5 km	MPC · JPL
879999	2014 OM_{425}	—	July 30, 2014	Kitt Peak	Spacewatch	EOS	1.2 km	MPC · JPL
880000	2014 OV_{425}	—	July 28, 2014	Haleakala	Pan-STARRS 1	·	1.5 km	MPC · JPL

back to top
