= 3391 Sinon =

Trojan asteroid

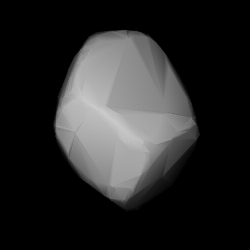
- Shape model of Sinon from its lightcurve

Discovery
- Discovered by: H. Kosai; K. Furukawa
- Discovery site: Kiso Station
- Discovery date: 18 February 1977

Designations
- Pronunciation: /ˈsaɪnɒn/
- Named after: Sinon (Greek mythology)
- Alternative designations: 1977 DD_{3}
- Minor planet category: Jupiter trojan Greek · background

Orbital characteristics
- Epoch 23 March 2018 (JD 2458200.5)
- Uncertainty parameter 0
- Observation arc: 63.16 yr (23,071 d)
- Aphelion: 5.7383 AU
- Perihelion: 4.8691 AU
- Semi-major axis: 5.3037 AU
- Eccentricity: 0.0819
- Orbital period (sidereal): 12.21 yr (4,461 d)
- Mean anomaly: 200.54°
- Mean motion: 0° 4^{m} 50.52^{s} / day
- Inclination: 14.871°
- Longitude of ascending node: 341.10°
- Argument of perihelion: 103.13°
- Jupiter MOID: 0.2572 AU
- T_{Jupiter}: 2.9260

Physical characteristics
- Mean diameter: 37.86±6.82 km 48.48 km (calculated)
- Synodic rotation period: 8.135 h (Note: Lightcurve plot of (3391) Sinon from Feb 2013 by Robert Stephens at the Center for Solar System Studies (U81). Quality code is not available (lightcurve rating at CS3). Summary figures at the LCDB and CS3.)
- Geometric albedo: 0.057 (assumed); 0.093±0.036
- Spectral type: C (assumed)
- Absolute magnitude (H): 10.3

3391 Sinon /ˈsaɪnɒn/ is a mid-sized Jupiter trojan from the Greek camp, approximately 40 kilometers (25 miles) in diameter. It was discovered on 18 February 1977, by Japanese astronomers Hiroki Kosai and Kiichirō Furukawa at the Kiso Observatory in Japan. The dark Jovian asteroid has a rotation period of 8.1 hours and likely an elongated shape. It was named after the hero Sinon from Greek mythology.

== Orbit and classification ==
Sinon is a dark Jovian asteroid in a 1:1 orbital resonance with Jupiter. It is located in the leading Greek camp at the Gas Giant's L_{4} Lagrangian point, 60° ahead on its orbit. It is also a non-family asteroid of the Jovian background population. It orbits the Sun at a distance of 4.9–5.7 AU once every 12 years and 3 months (4,461 days; semi-major axis of 5.3 AU). Its orbit has an eccentricity of 0.08 and an inclination of 15° with respect to the ecliptic. The body's observation arc begins with a precovery at Palomar Observatory in March 1953, almost 24 years prior to its official discovery observation at Kiso.

== Physical characteristics ==
Sinon is assumed to be a carbonaceous C-type asteroid.

=== Rotation period ===
In February 2013, a rotational lightcurve of Sinon was obtained from photometric observations by Lawrence Wasserman at Lowell Observatory and by Robert Stephens at the Center for Solar System Studies. Lightcurve analysis gave a well-defined rotation period of 8.135±0.002 hours with a brightness amplitude of 0.72 magnitude, indicative of a non-spherical shape (U=3).

=== Diameter and albedo ===
According to the survey carried out by the NEOWISE mission of NASA's Wide-field Infrared Survey Explorer, Sinon measures 37.86 kilometers in diameter and its surface has an albedo of 0.093, while the Collaborative Asteroid Lightcurve Link assumes a standard albedo for a carbonaceous asteroid of 0.057 and calculates a diameter of 48.48 kilometers based on an absolute magnitude of 10.3.

== Naming ==
This minor planet was named from Greek mythology after Sinon, a Greek warrior of the Trojan War. The official naming citation was published by the Minor Planet Center on 16 December 1986 (M.P.C. 11443).
