= List of minor planets: 18001–19000 =

The following is a partial list of minor planets, running from minor-planet number 18001 through 19000, inclusive. The primary data for this and other partial lists is based on JPL's "Small-Body Orbital Elements" and data available from the Minor Planet Center. Critical list information is also provided by the MPC, unless otherwise specified from Lowell Observatory. A detailed description of the table's columns and additional sources are given on the main page including a complete list of every page in this series, and a statistical break-up on the dynamical classification of minor planets.

Also see the summary list of all named bodies in numerical and alphabetical order, and the corresponding naming citations for the number range of this particular list. New namings may only be added to this list after official publication, as the preannouncement of names is condemned by the Working Group for Small Bodies Nomenclature of the International Astronomical Union.

Near-Earth obj.	MBA (inner)	MBA (outer)	Centaur
Mars-crosser	MBA (middle)	Jupiter trojan	Trans-Neptunian obj.
Unclassified

== 18001–18100 ==
Designation			Discovery			Properties		Ref
Permanent	Provisional	Named after	Date	Site	Discoverer(s)	Category	Diam.	Ref
18001 Lijing	1999 JY_{83}	Lijing	May 12, 1999	Socorro	LINEAR	·	9.9 km	MPC · JPL
18002	1999 JJ_{84}	—	May 12, 1999	Socorro	LINEAR	·	5.1 km	MPC · JPL
18003	1999 JU_{84}	—	May 13, 1999	Socorro	LINEAR	EUN	4.4 km	MPC · JPL
18004 Krystosek	1999 JD_{86}	Krystosek	May 12, 1999	Socorro	LINEAR	·	3.4 km	MPC · JPL
18005	1999 JD_{91}	—	May 12, 1999	Socorro	LINEAR	·	6.9 km	MPC · JPL
18006	1999 JE_{94}	—	May 12, 1999	Socorro	LINEAR	EOS	7.0 km	MPC · JPL
18007	1999 JK_{97}	—	May 12, 1999	Socorro	LINEAR	·	5.2 km	MPC · JPL
18008	1999 JV_{99}	—	May 12, 1999	Socorro	LINEAR	·	6.0 km	MPC · JPL
18009 Patrickgeer	1999 JP_{100}	Patrickgeer	May 12, 1999	Socorro	LINEAR	GEF	4.6 km	MPC · JPL
18010	1999 JQ_{100}	—	May 12, 1999	Socorro	LINEAR	·	5.5 km	MPC · JPL
18011	1999 JQ_{113}	—	May 13, 1999	Socorro	LINEAR	THM	7.2 km	MPC · JPL
18012 Marsland	1999 JM_{114}	Marsland	May 13, 1999	Socorro	LINEAR	·	3.9 km	MPC · JPL
18013 Shedletsky	1999 JS_{114}	Shedletsky	May 13, 1999	Socorro	LINEAR	·	7.9 km	MPC · JPL
18014	1999 JC_{121}	—	May 13, 1999	Socorro	LINEAR	·	5.3 km	MPC · JPL
18015 Semenkovich	1999 JD_{121}	Semenkovich	May 13, 1999	Socorro	LINEAR	V	2.5 km	MPC · JPL
18016 Grondahl	1999 JU_{122}	Grondahl	May 13, 1999	Socorro	LINEAR	·	7.0 km	MPC · JPL
18017	1999 JC_{124}	—	May 14, 1999	Socorro	LINEAR	·	7.1 km	MPC · JPL
18018	1999 JR_{125}	—	May 10, 1999	Socorro	LINEAR	·	3.3 km	MPC · JPL
18019 Dascoli	1999 JJ_{126}	Dascoli	May 13, 1999	Socorro	LINEAR	·	2.7 km	MPC · JPL
18020 Amend	1999 JT_{126}	Amend	May 13, 1999	Socorro	LINEAR	·	6.0 km	MPC · JPL
18021 Waldman	1999 JH_{127}	Waldman	May 13, 1999	Socorro	LINEAR	·	5.7 km	MPC · JPL
18022 Pepper	1999 JN_{127}	Pepper	May 13, 1999	Socorro	LINEAR	·	8.2 km	MPC · JPL
18023	1999 JQ_{129}	—	May 12, 1999	Socorro	LINEAR	EUN	4.7 km	MPC · JPL
18024 Dobson	1999 KK_{4}	Dobson	May 20, 1999	Oaxaca	Roe, J. M.	·	5.2 km	MPC · JPL
18025	1999 KF_{5}	—	May 18, 1999	Kitt Peak	Spacewatch	·	4.1 km	MPC · JPL
18026 Juliabaldwin	1999 KG_{13}	Juliabaldwin	May 18, 1999	Socorro	LINEAR	·	3.1 km	MPC · JPL
18027 Gokcay	1999 KL_{14}	Gokcay	May 18, 1999	Socorro	LINEAR	·	3.3 km	MPC · JPL
18028 Ramchandani	1999 KO_{14}	Ramchandani	May 18, 1999	Socorro	LINEAR	·	2.8 km	MPC · JPL
18029	1999 KA_{16}	—	May 21, 1999	Socorro	LINEAR	PHO	4.5 km	MPC · JPL
18030	1999 LX_{4}	—	June 8, 1999	Socorro	LINEAR	EUN	4.7 km	MPC · JPL
18031	1999 LO_{14}	—	June 9, 1999	Socorro	LINEAR	EUN	6.2 km	MPC · JPL
18032 Geiss	1999 MG_{1}	Geiss	June 20, 1999	Anderson Mesa	LONEOS	·	8.7 km	MPC · JPL
18033	1999 NR_{4}	—	July 14, 1999	Zeno	T. Stafford	EOS	7.6 km	MPC · JPL
18034	1999 NF_{6}	—	July 13, 1999	Socorro	LINEAR	·	6.6 km	MPC · JPL
18035	1999 NJ_{7}	—	July 13, 1999	Socorro	LINEAR	·	3.8 km	MPC · JPL
18036	1999 ND_{26}	—	July 14, 1999	Socorro	LINEAR	3:2 · SHU	17 km	MPC · JPL
18037	1999 NA_{38}	—	July 14, 1999	Socorro	LINEAR	L5	24 km	MPC · JPL
18038	1999 NR_{48}	—	July 13, 1999	Socorro	LINEAR	·	6.3 km	MPC · JPL
18039	1999 ND_{49}	—	July 13, 1999	Socorro	LINEAR	EOS	8.1 km	MPC · JPL
18040	1999 NC_{60}	—	July 13, 1999	Socorro	LINEAR	EUN	5.3 km	MPC · JPL
18041	1999 RX_{13}	—	September 7, 1999	Socorro	LINEAR	·	15 km	MPC · JPL
18042	1999 RF_{27}	—	September 7, 1999	Socorro	LINEAR	·	7.6 km	MPC · JPL
18043 Laszkowska	1999 RQ_{54}	Laszkowska	September 7, 1999	Socorro	LINEAR	KOR	5.1 km	MPC · JPL
18044	1999 RS_{89}	—	September 7, 1999	Socorro	LINEAR	·	3.9 km	MPC · JPL
18045	1999 RR_{100}	—	September 8, 1999	Socorro	LINEAR	·	17 km	MPC · JPL
18046	1999 RN_{116}	—	September 9, 1999	Socorro	LINEAR	L5	43 km	MPC · JPL
18047	1999 RP_{145}	—	September 9, 1999	Socorro	LINEAR	·	12 km	MPC · JPL
18048	1999 RG_{170}	—	September 9, 1999	Socorro	LINEAR	·	10 km	MPC · JPL
18049	1999 RX_{195}	—	September 8, 1999	Socorro	LINEAR	·	7.8 km	MPC · JPL
18050	1999 RS_{196}	—	September 8, 1999	Socorro	LINEAR	EOS	7.9 km	MPC · JPL
18051	1999 RU_{196}	—	September 8, 1999	Socorro	LINEAR	EOS	6.6 km	MPC · JPL
18052	1999 RV_{199}	—	September 8, 1999	Socorro	LINEAR	·	20 km	MPC · JPL
18053	1999 RU_{208}	—	September 8, 1999	Socorro	LINEAR	·	18 km	MPC · JPL
18054	1999 SW_{7}	—	September 29, 1999	Socorro	LINEAR	L5	36 km	MPC · JPL
18055 Fernhildebrandt	1999 TJ_{13}	Fernhildebrandt	October 11, 1999	Farpoint	G. Hug, G. Bell	EUN	5.4 km	MPC · JPL
18056	1999 TV_{15}	—	October 11, 1999	Gnosca	S. Sposetti	·	4.6 km	MPC · JPL
18057	1999 VK_{10}	—	November 9, 1999	Oizumi	T. Kobayashi	·	9.8 km	MPC · JPL
18058	1999 XY_{129}	—	December 12, 1999	Socorro	LINEAR	L4 · slow	20 km	MPC · JPL
18059 Cavalieri	1999 XL_{137}	Cavalieri	December 15, 1999	Prescott	P. G. Comba	·	7.0 km	MPC · JPL
18060 Zarex	1999 XJ_{156}	Zarex	December 8, 1999	Socorro	LINEAR	L4 · ERY	36 km	MPC · JPL
18061	1999 XH_{179}	—	December 10, 1999	Socorro	LINEAR	EOS	6.1 km	MPC · JPL
18062	1999 XY_{187}	—	December 12, 1999	Socorro	LINEAR	L4	30 km	MPC · JPL
18063	1999 XW_{211}	—	December 13, 1999	Socorro	LINEAR	L4	31 km	MPC · JPL
18064	1999 XY_{242}	—	December 13, 1999	Catalina	CSS	EUN	5.4 km	MPC · JPL
18065	2000 AM_{41}	—	January 3, 2000	Socorro	LINEAR	·	7.2 km	MPC · JPL
18066	2000 AR_{79}	—	January 5, 2000	Socorro	LINEAR	·	6.4 km	MPC · JPL
18067	2000 AB_{98}	—	January 4, 2000	Socorro	LINEAR	EUN	8.2 km	MPC · JPL
18068	2000 AF_{184}	—	January 7, 2000	Socorro	LINEAR	·	9.2 km	MPC · JPL
18069	2000 AS_{199}	—	January 9, 2000	Socorro	LINEAR	·	3.7 km	MPC · JPL
18070	2000 AC_{205}	—	January 13, 2000	Višnjan Observatory	K. Korlević	PHO	5.6 km	MPC · JPL
18071	2000 BA_{27}	—	January 30, 2000	Socorro	LINEAR	L4	22 km	MPC · JPL
18072	2000 CL_{71}	—	February 7, 2000	Socorro	LINEAR	·	4.4 km	MPC · JPL
18073	2000 CB_{82}	—	February 4, 2000	Socorro	LINEAR	·	2.9 km	MPC · JPL
18074	2000 DW	—	February 24, 2000	Oizumi	T. Kobayashi	·	3.5 km	MPC · JPL
18075 Donasharma	2000 DD_{5}	Donasharma	February 28, 2000	Socorro	LINEAR	SUL	5.3 km	MPC · JPL
18076	2000 DV_{59}	—	February 29, 2000	Socorro	LINEAR	LEO	6.7 km	MPC · JPL
18077 Dianeingrao	2000 EM_{148}	Dianeingrao	March 4, 2000	Catalina	CSS	·	4.6 km	MPC · JPL
18078	2000 FL_{31}	—	March 28, 2000	Socorro	LINEAR	ADE	12 km	MPC · JPL
18079 Lion-Stoppato	2000 FJ_{63}	Lion-Stoppato	March 27, 2000	Anderson Mesa	LONEOS	EOS	7.4 km	MPC · JPL
18080	2000 GW_{105}	—	April 7, 2000	Socorro	LINEAR	·	3.2 km	MPC · JPL
18081	2000 GB_{126}	—	April 7, 2000	Socorro	LINEAR	PHO	7.3 km	MPC · JPL
18082	2000 GB_{136}	—	April 12, 2000	Socorro	LINEAR	·	3.6 km	MPC · JPL
18083	2000 HD_{22}	—	April 29, 2000	Socorro	LINEAR	·	10 km	MPC · JPL
18084 Adamwohl	2000 HP_{47}	Adamwohl	April 29, 2000	Socorro	LINEAR	V	2.9 km	MPC · JPL
18085	2000 JZ_{14}	—	May 6, 2000	Socorro	LINEAR	·	5.5 km	MPC · JPL
18086 Emilykraft	2000 JQ_{21}	Emilykraft	May 6, 2000	Socorro	LINEAR	·	5.8 km	MPC · JPL
18087 Yamanaka	2000 JA_{22}	Yamanaka	May 6, 2000	Socorro	LINEAR	NYS	2.9 km	MPC · JPL
18088 Roberteunice	2000 JS_{30}	Roberteunice	May 7, 2000	Socorro	LINEAR	·	6.9 km	MPC · JPL
18089	2000 JB_{41}	—	May 6, 2000	Socorro	LINEAR	·	3.7 km	MPC · JPL
18090 Kevinkuo	2000 JA_{56}	Kevinkuo	May 6, 2000	Socorro	LINEAR	·	5.0 km	MPC · JPL
18091 Iranmanesh	2000 JN_{58}	Iranmanesh	May 6, 2000	Socorro	LINEAR	V	3.9 km	MPC · JPL
18092 Reinhold	2000 KR_{29}	Reinhold	May 28, 2000	Socorro	LINEAR	KOR	6.1 km	MPC · JPL
18093	2000 KS_{31}	—	May 28, 2000	Socorro	LINEAR	TIR	6.8 km	MPC · JPL
18094	2000 KN_{56}	—	May 27, 2000	Socorro	LINEAR	EOS	7.3 km	MPC · JPL
18095 Frankblock	2000 LL_{5}	Frankblock	June 5, 2000	Socorro	LINEAR	·	3.1 km	MPC · JPL
18096	2000 LM_{16}	—	June 1, 2000	Socorro	LINEAR	PHO · slow	7.4 km	MPC · JPL
18097	2000 LU_{19}	—	June 8, 2000	Socorro	LINEAR	·	3.6 km	MPC · JPL
18098	2000 LR_{20}	—	June 8, 2000	Socorro	LINEAR	GEF	5.6 km	MPC · JPL
18099 Flamini	2000 LD_{27}	Flamini	June 6, 2000	Anderson Mesa	LONEOS	EOS	5.8 km	MPC · JPL
18100 Lebreton	2000 LE_{28}	Lebreton	June 6, 2000	Anderson Mesa	LONEOS	·	2.6 km	MPC · JPL

== 18101–18200 ==
back to top

Designation			Discovery			Properties		Ref
Permanent	Provisional	Named after	Date	Site	Discoverer(s)	Category	Diam.	Ref
18101 Coustenis	2000 LF_{32}	Coustenis	June 5, 2000	Anderson Mesa	LONEOS	·	2.0 km	MPC · JPL
18102 Angrilli	2000 LN_{34}	Angrilli	June 3, 2000	Anderson Mesa	LONEOS	·	2.9 km	MPC · JPL
18103	2000 MC_{5}	—	June 26, 2000	Socorro	LINEAR	V	3.4 km	MPC · JPL
18104 Mahalingam	2000 NP_{3}	Mahalingam	July 3, 2000	Socorro	LINEAR	·	2.8 km	MPC · JPL
18105	2000 NT_{3}	—	July 7, 2000	Socorro	LINEAR	·	12 km	MPC · JPL
18106 Blume	2000 NX_{3}	Blume	July 4, 2000	Anderson Mesa	LONEOS	AMO +1km	990 m	MPC · JPL
18107	2000 NC_{5}	—	July 7, 2000	Socorro	LINEAR	NYS	4.4 km	MPC · JPL
18108	2000 NT_{5}	—	July 8, 2000	Socorro	LINEAR	·	7.2 km	MPC · JPL
18109	2000 NG_{11}	—	July 7, 2000	Socorro	LINEAR	AMO +1km	1.3 km	MPC · JPL
18110 HASI	2000 NK_{13}	HASI	July 5, 2000	Anderson Mesa	LONEOS	·	2.0 km	MPC · JPL
18111 Pinet	2000 NB_{14}	Pinet	July 5, 2000	Anderson Mesa	LONEOS	AGN	4.1 km	MPC · JPL
18112 Jeanlucjosset	2000 NX_{17}	Jeanlucjosset	July 5, 2000	Anderson Mesa	LONEOS	·	7.0 km	MPC · JPL
18113 Bibring	2000 NC_{19}	Bibring	July 5, 2000	Anderson Mesa	LONEOS	·	3.3 km	MPC · JPL
18114 Rosenbush	2000 NN_{19}	Rosenbush	July 5, 2000	Anderson Mesa	LONEOS	EUN	7.3 km	MPC · JPL
18115 Rathbun	2000 NT_{19}	Rathbun	July 5, 2000	Anderson Mesa	LONEOS	EOS	5.2 km	MPC · JPL
18116 Prato	2000 NY_{22}	Prato	July 5, 2000	Anderson Mesa	LONEOS	·	2.5 km	MPC · JPL
18117 Jonhodge	2000 NY_{23}	Jonhodge	July 5, 2000	Anderson Mesa	LONEOS	·	3.2 km	MPC · JPL
18118	2000 NB_{24}	—	July 5, 2000	Kitt Peak	Spacewatch	·	2.5 km	MPC · JPL
18119 Braude	2000 NZ_{24}	Braude	July 4, 2000	Anderson Mesa	LONEOS	·	2.4 km	MPC · JPL
18120 Lytvynenko	2000 NA_{25}	Lytvynenko	July 4, 2000	Anderson Mesa	LONEOS	·	2.3 km	MPC · JPL
18121 Konovalenko	2000 NF_{25}	Konovalenko	July 4, 2000	Anderson Mesa	LONEOS	·	9.2 km	MPC · JPL
18122 Forestamartin	2000 NL_{27}	Forestamartin	July 4, 2000	Anderson Mesa	LONEOS	KOR	6.6 km	MPC · JPL
18123 Pavan	2000 NS_{27}	Pavan	July 4, 2000	Anderson Mesa	LONEOS	KOR	4.6 km	MPC · JPL
18124 Leeperry	2000 NE_{28}	Leeperry	July 3, 2000	Socorro	LINEAR	·	3.8 km	MPC · JPL
18125 Brianwilson	2000 OF	Brianwilson	July 22, 2000	Reedy Creek	J. Broughton	·	4.3 km	MPC · JPL
18126	2000 OU_{3}	—	July 24, 2000	Socorro	LINEAR	DOR ·	10 km	MPC · JPL
18127 Denversmith	2000 OX_{3}	Denversmith	July 24, 2000	Socorro	LINEAR	·	3.2 km	MPC · JPL
18128 Wysner	2000 OD_{5}	Wysner	July 24, 2000	Socorro	LINEAR	·	2.3 km	MPC · JPL
18129	2000 OH_{5}	—	July 24, 2000	Socorro	LINEAR	·	5.3 km	MPC · JPL
18130	2000 OK_{5}	—	July 24, 2000	Socorro	LINEAR	·	8.1 km	MPC · JPL
18131	2000 OM_{5}	—	July 24, 2000	Socorro	LINEAR	·	8.0 km	MPC · JPL
18132 Spector	2000 ON_{9}	Spector	July 30, 2000	Reedy Creek	J. Broughton	·	5.1 km	MPC · JPL
18133	2000 OL_{12}	—	July 23, 2000	Socorro	LINEAR	·	5.9 km	MPC · JPL
18134	2000 OS_{14}	—	July 23, 2000	Socorro	LINEAR	URS	19 km	MPC · JPL
18135	2000 OQ_{20}	—	July 31, 2000	Socorro	LINEAR	·	14 km	MPC · JPL
18136	2000 OD_{21}	—	July 31, 2000	Socorro	LINEAR	·	4.4 km	MPC · JPL
18137	2000 OU_{30}	—	July 30, 2000	Socorro	LINEAR	L5	34 km	MPC · JPL
18138	2000 OP_{35}	—	July 31, 2000	Socorro	LINEAR	·	2.7 km	MPC · JPL
18139	2000 OF_{37}	—	July 30, 2000	Socorro	LINEAR	EOS	6.7 km	MPC · JPL
18140	2000 OD_{39}	—	July 30, 2000	Socorro	LINEAR	·	4.4 km	MPC · JPL
18141	2000 OK_{42}	—	July 30, 2000	Socorro	LINEAR	EOS	5.6 km	MPC · JPL
18142 Adamsidman	2000 OG_{47}	Adamsidman	July 31, 2000	Socorro	LINEAR	·	2.3 km	MPC · JPL
18143	2000 OK_{48}	—	July 31, 2000	Socorro	LINEAR	·	8.5 km	MPC · JPL
18144	2000 OO_{48}	—	July 31, 2000	Socorro	LINEAR	MAR	3.5 km	MPC · JPL
18145	2000 OX_{48}	—	July 31, 2000	Socorro	LINEAR	·	2.1 km	MPC · JPL
18146	2000 OU_{49}	—	July 31, 2000	Socorro	LINEAR	EUN	4.4 km	MPC · JPL
18147	2000 OY_{50}	—	July 31, 2000	Socorro	LINEAR	EUN	5.4 km	MPC · JPL
18148 Bellier	2000 OZ_{57}	Bellier	July 29, 2000	Anderson Mesa	LONEOS	THM	15 km	MPC · JPL
18149 Colombatti	2000 OB_{58}	Colombatti	July 29, 2000	Anderson Mesa	LONEOS	KOR	3.2 km	MPC · JPL
18150 Lopez-Moreno	2000 OC_{60}	Lopez-Moreno	July 29, 2000	Anderson Mesa	LONEOS	CYB	21 km	MPC · JPL
18151 Licchelli	2000 OT_{60}	Licchelli	July 29, 2000	Anderson Mesa	LONEOS	·	8.2 km	MPC · JPL
18152 Heidimanning	2000 OW_{60}	Heidimanning	July 29, 2000	Anderson Mesa	LONEOS	EOS	7.6 km	MPC · JPL
18153	2000 OC_{61}	—	July 30, 2000	Socorro	LINEAR	·	17 km	MPC · JPL
18154	2000 PA	—	August 1, 2000	Črni Vrh	Skvarč, J.	KOR	3.9 km	MPC · JPL
18155 Jasonschuler	2000 PF_{2}	Jasonschuler	August 1, 2000	Socorro	LINEAR	·	3.1 km	MPC · JPL
18156 Kamisaibara	2000 PU_{4}	Kamisaibara	August 3, 2000	Bisei SG Center	BATTeRS	EOS	10 km	MPC · JPL
18157 Craigwright	2000 PH_{10}	Craigwright	August 1, 2000	Socorro	LINEAR	·	3.1 km	MPC · JPL
18158 Nigelreuel	2000 PM_{10}	Nigelreuel	August 1, 2000	Socorro	LINEAR	V	2.7 km	MPC · JPL
18159 Andrewcook	2000 PW_{10}	Andrewcook	August 1, 2000	Socorro	LINEAR	·	3.2 km	MPC · JPL
18160 Nihon Uchu Forum	2000 PY_{12}	Nihon Uchu Forum	August 7, 2000	Bisei SG Center	BATTeRS	EOS	7.4 km	MPC · JPL
18161 Koshiishi	2000 PZ_{12}	Koshiishi	August 7, 2000	Bisei SG Center	BATTeRS	EOS	12 km	MPC · JPL
18162 Denlea	2000 PX_{15}	Denlea	August 1, 2000	Socorro	LINEAR	·	1.8 km	MPC · JPL
18163 Jennalewis	2000 PF_{16}	Jennalewis	August 1, 2000	Socorro	LINEAR	·	4.4 km	MPC · JPL
18164	2000 PA_{20}	—	August 1, 2000	Socorro	LINEAR	EOS	8.2 km	MPC · JPL
18165	2000 PN_{20}	—	August 1, 2000	Socorro	LINEAR	NYS	2.6 km	MPC · JPL
18166	2000 PG_{27}	—	August 8, 2000	Valinhos	P. R. Holvorcem	·	2.5 km	MPC · JPL
18167 Buttani	2000 PS_{27}	Buttani	August 6, 2000	Valmeca	Valmeca	·	8.4 km	MPC · JPL
18168	2000 PN_{28}	—	August 4, 2000	Haleakala	NEAT	·	5.4 km	MPC · JPL
18169 Amaldi	2000 QF	Amaldi	August 20, 2000	Colleverde	V. S. Casulli	·	23 km	MPC · JPL
18170 Ramjeawan	2000 QW_{2}	Ramjeawan	August 24, 2000	Socorro	LINEAR	·	5.5 km	MPC · JPL
18171 Romaneskue	2000 QB_{5}	Romaneskue	August 24, 2000	Socorro	LINEAR	NYS	1.9 km	MPC · JPL
18172	2000 QL_{7}	—	August 25, 2000	Socorro	LINEAR	AMO +1km	2.6 km	MPC · JPL
18173	2000 QD_{8}	—	August 25, 2000	Višnjan Observatory	K. Korlević, M. Jurić	·	2.8 km	MPC · JPL
18174 Khachatryan	2000 QW_{14}	Khachatryan	August 24, 2000	Socorro	LINEAR	·	3.6 km	MPC · JPL
18175 Jenniferchoy	2000 QB_{15}	Jenniferchoy	August 24, 2000	Socorro	LINEAR	·	3.6 km	MPC · JPL
18176 Julianhong	2000 QG_{22}	Julianhong	August 24, 2000	Socorro	LINEAR	(5)	2.9 km	MPC · JPL
18177 Harunaga	2000 QK_{27}	Harunaga	August 24, 2000	Socorro	LINEAR	·	10 km	MPC · JPL
18178	2000 QP_{28}	—	August 24, 2000	Socorro	LINEAR	·	2.7 km	MPC · JPL
18179	2000 QV_{29}	—	August 25, 2000	Socorro	LINEAR	·	3.7 km	MPC · JPL
18180 Irenesun	2000 QB_{30}	Irenesun	August 25, 2000	Socorro	LINEAR	·	3.1 km	MPC · JPL
18181	2000 QD_{34}	—	August 26, 2000	Socorro	LINEAR	·	4.6 km	MPC · JPL
18182 Wiener	2000 QC_{35}	Wiener	August 27, 2000	Ondřejov	P. Pravec, P. Kušnirák	KOR	4.0 km	MPC · JPL
18183	2000 QG_{37}	—	August 24, 2000	Socorro	LINEAR	NYS	3.9 km	MPC · JPL
18184 Dianepark	2000 QR_{37}	Dianepark	August 24, 2000	Socorro	LINEAR	·	3.4 km	MPC · JPL
18185	2000 QW_{49}	—	August 24, 2000	Socorro	LINEAR	·	9.9 km	MPC · JPL
18186	2000 QW_{50}	—	August 24, 2000	Socorro	LINEAR	·	7.0 km	MPC · JPL
18187	2000 QQ_{53}	—	August 25, 2000	Socorro	LINEAR	·	5.8 km	MPC · JPL
18188	2000 QD_{55}	—	August 25, 2000	Socorro	LINEAR	·	6.9 km	MPC · JPL
18189 Medeobaldia	2000 QN_{82}	Medeobaldia	August 24, 2000	Socorro	LINEAR	·	6.2 km	MPC · JPL
18190 Michaelpizer	2000 QY_{89}	Michaelpizer	August 25, 2000	Socorro	LINEAR	·	3.7 km	MPC · JPL
18191 Rayhe	2000 QL_{90}	Rayhe	August 25, 2000	Socorro	LINEAR	HOF	11 km	MPC · JPL
18192 Craigwallace	2000 QP_{90}	Craigwallace	August 25, 2000	Socorro	LINEAR	·	6.3 km	MPC · JPL
18193 Hollilydrury	2000 QT_{93}	Hollilydrury	August 26, 2000	Socorro	LINEAR	·	3.8 km	MPC · JPL
18194	2000 QE_{100}	—	August 28, 2000	Socorro	LINEAR	·	9.0 km	MPC · JPL
18195	2000 QG_{116}	—	August 28, 2000	Socorro	LINEAR	·	1.8 km	MPC · JPL
18196 Rowberry	2000 QY_{132}	Rowberry	August 26, 2000	Socorro	LINEAR	·	3.0 km	MPC · JPL
18197 Brandondotson	2055 P-L	Brandondotson	September 24, 1960	Palomar	C. J. van Houten, I. van Houten-Groeneveld, T. Gehrels	·	2.8 km	MPC · JPL
18198 Benjaminbyron	2056 P-L	Benjaminbyron	September 24, 1960	Palomar	C. J. van Houten, I. van Houten-Groeneveld, T. Gehrels	·	9.7 km	MPC · JPL
18199 Shackelford	2583 P-L	Shackelford	September 24, 1960	Palomar	C. J. van Houten, I. van Houten-Groeneveld, T. Gehrels	KOR ·	4.0 km	MPC · JPL
18200 Flaviarommel	2714 P-L	Flaviarommel	September 24, 1960	Palomar	C. J. van Houten, I. van Houten-Groeneveld, T. Gehrels	·	3.4 km	MPC · JPL

== 18201–18300 ==
back to top

Designation			Discovery			Properties		Ref
Permanent	Provisional	Named after	Date	Site	Discoverer(s)	Category	Diam.	Ref
18201 Proudfoot	2733 P-L	Proudfoot	September 24, 1960	Palomar	C. J. van Houten, I. van Houten-Groeneveld, T. Gehrels	·	2.9 km	MPC · JPL
18202 Nichols-Fleming	2757 P-L	Nichols-Fleming	September 24, 1960	Palomar	C. J. van Houten, I. van Houten-Groeneveld, T. Gehrels	(3460)	7.5 km	MPC · JPL
18203 Schörghofer	2837 P-L	Schörghofer	September 24, 1960	Palomar	C. J. van Houten, I. van Houten-Groeneveld, T. Gehrels	·	2.5 km	MPC · JPL
18204 Emilycostello	3065 P-L	Emilycostello	September 24, 1960	Palomar	C. J. van Houten, I. van Houten-Groeneveld, T. Gehrels	·	4.9 km	MPC · JPL
18205 Camarca	3090 P-L	Camarca	September 24, 1960	Palomar	C. J. van Houten, I. van Houten-Groeneveld, T. Gehrels	·	12 km	MPC · JPL
18206	3093 P-L	—	September 24, 1960	Palomar	C. J. van Houten, I. van Houten-Groeneveld, T. Gehrels	·	10 km	MPC · JPL
18207	4041 P-L	—	September 24, 1960	Palomar	C. J. van Houten, I. van Houten-Groeneveld, T. Gehrels	NYS ·	4.4 km	MPC · JPL
18208	4095 P-L	—	September 24, 1960	Palomar	C. J. van Houten, I. van Houten-Groeneveld, T. Gehrels	·	3.7 km	MPC · JPL
18209	4158 P-L	—	September 24, 1960	Palomar	C. J. van Houten, I. van Houten-Groeneveld, T. Gehrels	·	3.5 km	MPC · JPL
18210	4529 P-L	—	September 24, 1960	Palomar	C. J. van Houten, I. van Houten-Groeneveld, T. Gehrels	·	7.0 km	MPC · JPL
18211	4597 P-L	—	September 24, 1960	Palomar	C. J. van Houten, I. van Houten-Groeneveld, T. Gehrels	·	2.2 km	MPC · JPL
18212	4603 P-L	—	September 24, 1960	Palomar	C. J. van Houten, I. van Houten-Groeneveld, T. Gehrels	THM	9.9 km	MPC · JPL
18213	4607 P-L	—	September 24, 1960	Palomar	C. J. van Houten, I. van Houten-Groeneveld, T. Gehrels	·	7.4 km	MPC · JPL
18214	4615 P-L	—	September 24, 1960	Palomar	C. J. van Houten, I. van Houten-Groeneveld, T. Gehrels	THM	8.8 km	MPC · JPL
18215	4792 P-L	—	September 24, 1960	Palomar	C. J. van Houten, I. van Houten-Groeneveld, T. Gehrels	·	3.5 km	MPC · JPL
18216	4917 P-L	—	September 24, 1960	Palomar	C. J. van Houten, I. van Houten-Groeneveld, T. Gehrels	·	3.1 km	MPC · JPL
18217	5021 P-L	—	October 17, 1960	Palomar	C. J. van Houten, I. van Houten-Groeneveld, T. Gehrels	·	2.7 km	MPC · JPL
18218	6245 P-L	—	September 24, 1960	Palomar	C. J. van Houten, I. van Houten-Groeneveld, T. Gehrels	EUN	4.0 km	MPC · JPL
18219	6260 P-L	—	September 24, 1960	Palomar	C. J. van Houten, I. van Houten-Groeneveld, T. Gehrels	URS	23 km	MPC · JPL
18220	6286 P-L	—	September 24, 1960	Palomar	C. J. van Houten, I. van Houten-Groeneveld, T. Gehrels	·	8.4 km	MPC · JPL
18221	6526 P-L	—	September 24, 1960	Palomar	C. J. van Houten, I. van Houten-Groeneveld, T. Gehrels	·	7.1 km	MPC · JPL
18222	6669 P-L	—	September 24, 1960	Palomar	C. J. van Houten, I. van Houten-Groeneveld, T. Gehrels	·	2.0 km	MPC · JPL
18223	6700 P-L	—	September 24, 1960	Palomar	C. J. van Houten, I. van Houten-Groeneveld, T. Gehrels	·	4.3 km	MPC · JPL
18224	6726 P-L	—	September 24, 1960	Palomar	C. J. van Houten, I. van Houten-Groeneveld, T. Gehrels	KOR	3.0 km	MPC · JPL
18225	7069 P-L	—	October 22, 1960	Palomar	C. J. van Houten, I. van Houten-Groeneveld, T. Gehrels	·	3.5 km	MPC · JPL
18226	1182 T-1	—	March 25, 1971	Palomar	C. J. van Houten, I. van Houten-Groeneveld, T. Gehrels	EUN	5.6 km	MPC · JPL
18227	1222 T-1	—	March 25, 1971	Palomar	C. J. van Houten, I. van Houten-Groeneveld, T. Gehrels	·	7.8 km	MPC · JPL
18228 Hyperenor	3163 T-1	Hyperenor	March 26, 1971	Palomar	C. J. van Houten, I. van Houten-Groeneveld, T. Gehrels	L5	23 km	MPC · JPL
18229	3222 T-1	—	March 26, 1971	Palomar	C. J. van Houten, I. van Houten-Groeneveld, T. Gehrels	·	2.5 km	MPC · JPL
18230	3285 T-1	—	March 26, 1971	Palomar	C. J. van Houten, I. van Houten-Groeneveld, T. Gehrels	·	3.9 km	MPC · JPL
18231	3286 T-1	—	March 26, 1971	Palomar	C. J. van Houten, I. van Houten-Groeneveld, T. Gehrels	·	5.4 km	MPC · JPL
18232	3322 T-1	—	March 26, 1971	Palomar	C. J. van Houten, I. van Houten-Groeneveld, T. Gehrels	·	6.8 km	MPC · JPL
18233	4068 T-1	—	March 26, 1971	Palomar	C. J. van Houten, I. van Houten-Groeneveld, T. Gehrels	EOS	5.8 km	MPC · JPL
18234	4262 T-1	—	March 26, 1971	Palomar	C. J. van Houten, I. van Houten-Groeneveld, T. Gehrels	·	7.7 km	MPC · JPL
18235 Lynden-Bell	1003 T-2	Lynden-Bell	September 29, 1973	Palomar	C. J. van Houten, I. van Houten-Groeneveld, T. Gehrels	THM	8.8 km	MPC · JPL
18236 Bernardburke	1059 T-2	Bernardburke	September 29, 1973	Palomar	C. J. van Houten, I. van Houten-Groeneveld, T. Gehrels	·	5.7 km	MPC · JPL
18237 Kenfreeman	1182 T-2	Kenfreeman	September 29, 1973	Palomar	C. J. van Houten, I. van Houten-Groeneveld, T. Gehrels	NYS	2.2 km	MPC · JPL
18238 Frankshu	1241 T-2	Frankshu	September 29, 1973	Palomar	C. J. van Houten, I. van Houten-Groeneveld, T. Gehrels	·	4.8 km	MPC · JPL
18239 Ekers	1251 T-2	Ekers	September 29, 1973	Palomar	C. J. van Houten, I. van Houten-Groeneveld, T. Gehrels	·	10 km	MPC · JPL
18240 Mould	1317 T-2	Mould	September 29, 1973	Palomar	C. J. van Houten, I. van Houten-Groeneveld, T. Gehrels	·	3.0 km	MPC · JPL
18241 Genzel	1325 T-2	Genzel	September 29, 1973	Palomar	C. J. van Houten, I. van Houten-Groeneveld, T. Gehrels	PAD	6.4 km	MPC · JPL
18242 Peebles	2102 T-2	Peebles	September 29, 1973	Palomar	C. J. van Houten, I. van Houten-Groeneveld, T. Gehrels	NYS	3.0 km	MPC · JPL
18243 Gunn	2272 T-2	Gunn	September 29, 1973	Palomar	C. J. van Houten, I. van Houten-Groeneveld, T. Gehrels	·	4.9 km	MPC · JPL
18244 Anneila	3008 T-2	Anneila	September 30, 1973	Palomar	C. J. van Houten, I. van Houten-Groeneveld, T. Gehrels	·	4.5 km	MPC · JPL
18245	3061 T-2	—	September 30, 1973	Palomar	C. J. van Houten, I. van Houten-Groeneveld, T. Gehrels	·	6.7 km	MPC · JPL
18246	3088 T-2	—	September 30, 1973	Palomar	C. J. van Houten, I. van Houten-Groeneveld, T. Gehrels	·	3.6 km	MPC · JPL
18247	3151 T-2	—	September 30, 1973	Palomar	C. J. van Houten, I. van Houten-Groeneveld, T. Gehrels	·	2.5 km	MPC · JPL
18248	3152 T-2	—	September 30, 1973	Palomar	C. J. van Houten, I. van Houten-Groeneveld, T. Gehrels	·	1.9 km	MPC · JPL
18249	3175 T-2	—	September 30, 1973	Palomar	C. J. van Houten, I. van Houten-Groeneveld, T. Gehrels	·	1.5 km	MPC · JPL
18250	3178 T-2	—	September 30, 1973	Palomar	C. J. van Houten, I. van Houten-Groeneveld, T. Gehrels	·	4.4 km	MPC · JPL
18251	3207 T-2	—	September 30, 1973	Palomar	C. J. van Houten, I. van Houten-Groeneveld, T. Gehrels	·	2.7 km	MPC · JPL
18252	3282 T-2	—	September 30, 1973	Palomar	C. J. van Houten, I. van Houten-Groeneveld, T. Gehrels	·	2.5 km	MPC · JPL
18253	3295 T-2	—	September 30, 1973	Palomar	C. J. van Houten, I. van Houten-Groeneveld, T. Gehrels	V	2.5 km	MPC · JPL
18254	4062 T-2	—	September 29, 1973	Palomar	C. J. van Houten, I. van Houten-Groeneveld, T. Gehrels	EUN	4.5 km	MPC · JPL
18255	4188 T-2	—	September 29, 1973	Palomar	C. J. van Houten, I. van Houten-Groeneveld, T. Gehrels	·	4.8 km	MPC · JPL
18256	4195 T-2	—	September 29, 1973	Palomar	C. J. van Houten, I. van Houten-Groeneveld, T. Gehrels	·	5.5 km	MPC · JPL
18257	4209 T-2	—	September 29, 1973	Palomar	C. J. van Houten, I. van Houten-Groeneveld, T. Gehrels	HYG	6.9 km	MPC · JPL
18258	4250 T-2	—	September 29, 1973	Palomar	C. J. van Houten, I. van Houten-Groeneveld, T. Gehrels	·	4.8 km	MPC · JPL
18259	4311 T-2	—	September 29, 1973	Palomar	C. J. van Houten, I. van Houten-Groeneveld, T. Gehrels	·	2.0 km	MPC · JPL
18260	5056 T-2	—	September 25, 1973	Palomar	C. J. van Houten, I. van Houten-Groeneveld, T. Gehrels	PHO	2.5 km	MPC · JPL
18261	5065 T-2	—	September 25, 1973	Palomar	C. J. van Houten, I. van Houten-Groeneveld, T. Gehrels	·	2.9 km	MPC · JPL
18262	5125 T-2	—	September 25, 1973	Palomar	C. J. van Houten, I. van Houten-Groeneveld, T. Gehrels	·	9.1 km	MPC · JPL
18263 Anchialos	5167 T-2	Anchialos	September 25, 1973	Palomar	C. J. van Houten, I. van Houten-Groeneveld, T. Gehrels	L4	21 km	MPC · JPL
18264	5184 T-2	—	September 25, 1973	Palomar	C. J. van Houten, I. van Houten-Groeneveld, T. Gehrels	·	4.7 km	MPC · JPL
18265	1136 T-3	—	October 16, 1977	Palomar	C. J. van Houten, I. van Houten-Groeneveld, T. Gehrels	·	2.1 km	MPC · JPL
18266	1189 T-3	—	October 17, 1977	Palomar	C. J. van Houten, I. van Houten-Groeneveld, T. Gehrels	·	3.0 km	MPC · JPL
18267	2122 T-3	—	October 16, 1977	Palomar	C. J. van Houten, I. van Houten-Groeneveld, T. Gehrels	·	1.7 km	MPC · JPL
18268 Dardanos	2140 T-3	Dardanos	October 16, 1977	Palomar	C. J. van Houten, I. van Houten-Groeneveld, T. Gehrels	L5	20 km	MPC · JPL
18269	2206 T-3	—	October 16, 1977	Palomar	C. J. van Houten, I. van Houten-Groeneveld, T. Gehrels	AGN	3.0 km	MPC · JPL
18270	2312 T-3	—	October 16, 1977	Palomar	C. J. van Houten, I. van Houten-Groeneveld, T. Gehrels	·	2.2 km	MPC · JPL
18271	2332 T-3	—	October 16, 1977	Palomar	C. J. van Houten, I. van Houten-Groeneveld, T. Gehrels	V	4.3 km	MPC · JPL
18272	2495 T-3	—	October 16, 1977	Palomar	C. J. van Houten, I. van Houten-Groeneveld, T. Gehrels	·	2.7 km	MPC · JPL
18273	3140 T-3	—	October 16, 1977	Palomar	C. J. van Houten, I. van Houten-Groeneveld, T. Gehrels	·	2.0 km	MPC · JPL
18274	3150 T-3	—	October 16, 1977	Palomar	C. J. van Houten, I. van Houten-Groeneveld, T. Gehrels	AST	4.9 km	MPC · JPL
18275	3173 T-3	—	October 16, 1977	Palomar	C. J. van Houten, I. van Houten-Groeneveld, T. Gehrels	·	6.2 km	MPC · JPL
18276	3355 T-3	—	October 16, 1977	Palomar	C. J. van Houten, I. van Houten-Groeneveld, T. Gehrels	fast	5.2 km	MPC · JPL
18277	3446 T-3	—	October 16, 1977	Palomar	C. J. van Houten, I. van Houten-Groeneveld, T. Gehrels	AGN	4.5 km	MPC · JPL
18278 Dymas	4035 T-3	Dymas	October 16, 1977	Palomar	C. J. van Houten, I. van Houten-Groeneveld, T. Gehrels	L5	29 km	MPC · JPL
18279	4221 T-3	—	October 16, 1977	Palomar	C. J. van Houten, I. van Houten-Groeneveld, T. Gehrels	·	7.6 km	MPC · JPL
18280	4245 T-3	—	October 16, 1977	Palomar	C. J. van Houten, I. van Houten-Groeneveld, T. Gehrels	·	5.7 km	MPC · JPL
18281 Tros	4317 T-3	Tros	October 16, 1977	Palomar	C. J. van Houten, I. van Houten-Groeneveld, T. Gehrels	L5	14 km	MPC · JPL
18282 Ilos	4369 T-3	Ilos	October 16, 1977	Palomar	C. J. van Houten, I. van Houten-Groeneveld, T. Gehrels	L5	15 km	MPC · JPL
18283	5165 T-3	—	October 16, 1977	Palomar	C. J. van Houten, I. van Houten-Groeneveld, T. Gehrels	V	2.6 km	MPC · JPL
18284 Tsereteli	1970 PU	Tsereteli	August 10, 1970	Nauchnij	Crimean Astrophysical Observatory	·	3.2 km	MPC · JPL
18285 Vladplatonov	1972 GJ	Vladplatonov	April 14, 1972	Nauchnij	L. I. Chernykh	ADE	16 km	MPC · JPL
18286 Kneipp	1973 UN_{5}	Kneipp	October 27, 1973	Tautenburg Observatory	F. Börngen	·	4.0 km	MPC · JPL
18287 Verkin	1975 TU_{3}	Verkin	October 3, 1975	Nauchnij	L. I. Chernykh	·	5.5 km	MPC · JPL
18288 Nozdrachev	1975 VX_{2}	Nozdrachev	November 2, 1975	Nauchnij	T. M. Smirnova	·	8.8 km	MPC · JPL
18289 Yokoyamakoichi	1976 UB_{16}	Yokoyamakoichi	October 22, 1976	Kiso	H. Kosai, K. Furukawa	·	8.2 km	MPC · JPL
18290 Sumiyoshi	1977 DR_{2}	Sumiyoshi	February 18, 1977	Kiso	H. Kosai, K. Furukawa	V	3.7 km	MPC · JPL
18291 Wani	1977 DL_{4}	Wani	February 18, 1977	Kiso	H. Kosai, K. Furukawa	·	3.6 km	MPC · JPL
18292 Zoltowski	1977 FB	Zoltowski	March 17, 1977	Harvard Observatory	Harvard Observatory	KOR	4.6 km	MPC · JPL
18293 Pilyugin	1978 SQ_{4}	Pilyugin	September 27, 1978	Nauchnij	L. I. Chernykh	·	5.1 km	MPC · JPL
18294 Rudenko	1978 SF_{5}	Rudenko	September 27, 1978	Nauchnij	L. I. Chernykh	(2076)	3.0 km	MPC · JPL
18295 Borispetrov	1978 TT_{7}	Borispetrov	October 2, 1978	Nauchnij	L. V. Zhuravleva	·	6.8 km	MPC · JPL
18296	1978 VW_{2}	—	November 7, 1978	Palomar	E. F. Helin, S. J. Bus	THM	7.2 km	MPC · JPL
18297	1978 VG_{4}	—	November 7, 1978	Palomar	E. F. Helin, S. J. Bus	·	4.9 km	MPC · JPL
18298	1979 MZ_{4}	—	June 25, 1979	Siding Spring	E. F. Helin, S. J. Bus	·	3.5 km	MPC · JPL
18299	1979 MT_{8}	—	June 25, 1979	Siding Spring	E. F. Helin, S. J. Bus	·	7.5 km	MPC · JPL
18300	1979 PA	—	August 14, 1979	Kleť	A. Mrkos	·	9.7 km	MPC · JPL

== 18301–18400 ==
back to top

Designation			Discovery			Properties		Ref
Permanent	Provisional	Named after	Date	Site	Discoverer(s)	Category	Diam.	Ref
18301 Konyukhov	1979 QZ_{9}	Konyukhov	August 27, 1979	Nauchnij	N. S. Chernykh	moon	5.7 km	MPC · JPL
18302 Körner	1980 FL_{3}	Körner	March 16, 1980	La Silla	C.-I. Lagerkvist	·	8.6 km	MPC · JPL
18303	1980 PU	—	August 6, 1980	Kleť	Z. Vávrová	moon	3.5 km	MPC · JPL
18304	1981 DH_{1}	—	February 28, 1981	Siding Spring	S. J. Bus	·	6.0 km	MPC · JPL
18305	1981 DL_{1}	—	February 28, 1981	Siding Spring	S. J. Bus	·	7.8 km	MPC · JPL
18306	1981 EF_{9}	—	March 1, 1981	Siding Spring	S. J. Bus	·	2.6 km	MPC · JPL
18307	1981 ER_{10}	—	March 1, 1981	Siding Spring	S. J. Bus	·	2.8 km	MPC · JPL
18308	1981 EZ_{11}	—	March 7, 1981	Siding Spring	S. J. Bus	·	2.5 km	MPC · JPL
18309	1981 EV_{13}	—	March 1, 1981	Siding Spring	S. J. Bus	·	6.7 km	MPC · JPL
18310	1981 EJ_{16}	—	March 1, 1981	Siding Spring	S. J. Bus	V	1.7 km	MPC · JPL
18311	1981 EV_{16}	—	March 6, 1981	Siding Spring	S. J. Bus	·	2.1 km	MPC · JPL
18312	1981 EC_{19}	—	March 2, 1981	Siding Spring	S. J. Bus	·	3.1 km	MPC · JPL
18313	1981 EB_{23}	—	March 2, 1981	Siding Spring	S. J. Bus	NYS	5.8 km	MPC · JPL
18314	1981 EX_{27}	—	March 2, 1981	Siding Spring	S. J. Bus	·	1.9 km	MPC · JPL
18315	1981 ED_{37}	—	March 11, 1981	Siding Spring	S. J. Bus	·	3.0 km	MPC · JPL
18316	1981 EJ_{38}	—	March 1, 1981	Siding Spring	S. J. Bus	·	4.6 km	MPC · JPL
18317	1981 EM_{41}	—	March 2, 1981	Siding Spring	S. J. Bus	·	8.6 km	MPC · JPL
18318	1981 ET_{43}	—	March 6, 1981	Siding Spring	S. J. Bus	EUP	7.1 km	MPC · JPL
18319	1981 QS_{2}	—	August 23, 1981	La Silla	H. Debehogne	NYS	4.7 km	MPC · JPL
18320	1981 UJ_{28}	—	October 24, 1981	Palomar	S. J. Bus	NYS	4.8 km	MPC · JPL
18321 Bobrov	1982 UQ_{10}	Bobrov	October 25, 1982	Nauchnij	L. V. Zhuravleva	·	3.8 km	MPC · JPL
18322 Korokan	1982 VF_{5}	Korokan	November 14, 1982	Kiso	H. Kosai, K. Furukawa	·	4.2 km	MPC · JPL
18323	1983 RZ_{2}	—	September 2, 1983	La Silla	H. Debehogne	RAF	5.7 km	MPC · JPL
18324	1984 HA_{2}	—	April 27, 1984	La Silla	La Silla	·	10 km	MPC · JPL
18325	1984 SB_{2}	—	September 29, 1984	Kleť	A. Mrkos	·	6.6 km	MPC · JPL
18326	1985 CV_{1}	—	February 11, 1985	La Silla	H. Debehogne	THM	8.9 km	MPC · JPL
18327	1985 CX_{1}	—	February 12, 1985	La Silla	H. Debehogne	·	2.7 km	MPC · JPL
18328	1985 UU	—	October 20, 1985	Kleť	A. Mrkos	·	4.9 km	MPC · JPL
18329	1986 RY_{4}	—	September 1, 1986	La Silla	H. Debehogne	·	3.1 km	MPC · JPL
18330	1987 BW_{1}	—	January 25, 1987	La Silla	E. W. Elst	·	2.2 km	MPC · JPL
18331	1987 DQ_{6}	—	February 24, 1987	La Silla	H. Debehogne	·	28 km	MPC · JPL
18332	1987 ON	—	July 19, 1987	Palomar	E. F. Helin	EUN ·	6.5 km	MPC · JPL
18333	1987 OV	—	July 19, 1987	Palomar	E. F. Helin	KON	10 km	MPC · JPL
18334 Drozdov	1987 RA_{3}	Drozdov	September 2, 1987	Nauchnij	L. G. Karachkina	·	4.2 km	MPC · JPL
18335 San Cassiano	1987 SC_{1}	San Cassiano	September 19, 1987	Anderson Mesa	E. Bowell	·	4.3 km	MPC · JPL
18336	1988 LG	—	June 15, 1988	Palomar	E. F. Helin	PHO	12 km	MPC · JPL
18337	1988 RB_{11}	—	September 14, 1988	Cerro Tololo	S. J. Bus	THM	5.3 km	MPC · JPL
18338	1989 EP_{2}	—	March 4, 1989	Palomar	E. F. Helin	GEF	5.0 km	MPC · JPL
18339	1989 GM_{2}	—	April 3, 1989	La Silla	E. W. Elst	·	6.9 km	MPC · JPL
18340	1989 OM	—	July 29, 1989	Lake Tekapo	A. C. Gilmore, P. M. Kilmartin	·	13 km	MPC · JPL
18341	1989 SJ_{5}	—	September 26, 1989	La Silla	E. W. Elst	V	4.4 km	MPC · JPL
18342	1989 ST_{9}	—	September 26, 1989	La Silla	H. Debehogne	NYS	1.8 km	MPC · JPL
18343 Asja	1989 TN	Asja	October 2, 1989	Smolyan	E. W. Elst	NYS	3.4 km	MPC · JPL
18344	1989 TN_{11}	—	October 2, 1989	Cerro Tololo	S. J. Bus	·	3.3 km	MPC · JPL
18345	1989 UP_{4}	—	October 22, 1989	Kleť	Z. Vávrová	THM	9.2 km	MPC · JPL
18346	1989 WG	—	November 20, 1989	Gekko	Y. Oshima	·	6.4 km	MPC · JPL
18347	1989 WU	—	November 20, 1989	Oohira	Oohira	·	4.0 km	MPC · JPL
18348	1990 BM_{1}	—	January 22, 1990	Palomar	E. F. Helin	PHO	4.7 km	MPC · JPL
18349 Dafydd	1990 OV_{4}	Dafydd	July 25, 1990	Palomar	H. E. Holt	·	11 km	MPC · JPL
18350	1990 QJ_{2}	—	August 22, 1990	Palomar	H. E. Holt	·	2.0 km	MPC · JPL
18351	1990 QN_{5}	—	August 29, 1990	Palomar	H. E. Holt	GEF	5.8 km	MPC · JPL
18352	1990 QB_{8}	—	August 16, 1990	La Silla	E. W. Elst	·	7.5 km	MPC · JPL
18353	1990 QF_{9}	—	August 16, 1990	La Silla	E. W. Elst	·	10 km	MPC · JPL
18354	1990 RK_{5}	—	September 15, 1990	Palomar	H. E. Holt	·	7.1 km	MPC · JPL
18355	1990 RN_{9}	—	September 14, 1990	Palomar	H. E. Holt	·	10 km	MPC · JPL
18356	1990 SF_{1}	—	September 16, 1990	Palomar	H. E. Holt	·	9.4 km	MPC · JPL
18357	1990 SR_{2}	—	September 18, 1990	Palomar	H. E. Holt	·	2.9 km	MPC · JPL
18358	1990 SB_{11}	—	September 16, 1990	Palomar	H. E. Holt	·	3.6 km	MPC · JPL
18359 Jakobstaude	1990 TL_{7}	Jakobstaude	October 13, 1990	Tautenburg Observatory	L. D. Schmadel, F. Börngen	KOR	3.6 km	MPC · JPL
18360 Sachs	1990 TF_{9}	Sachs	October 10, 1990	Tautenburg Observatory	F. Börngen, L. D. Schmadel	·	5.4 km	MPC · JPL
18361	1990 VN_{6}	—	November 15, 1990	La Silla	E. W. Elst	V	2.3 km	MPC · JPL
18362	1990 VX_{6}	—	November 15, 1990	La Silla	E. W. Elst	EOS	5.5 km	MPC · JPL
18363	1990 VW_{8}	—	November 12, 1990	La Silla	E. W. Elst	·	7.3 km	MPC · JPL
18364	1990 WF_{4}	—	November 16, 1990	La Silla	E. W. Elst	·	14 km	MPC · JPL
18365 Shimomoto	1990 WN_{5}	Shimomoto	November 17, 1990	Geisei	T. Seki	EOS	15 km	MPC · JPL
18366	1991 DG_{1}	—	February 18, 1991	Palomar	E. F. Helin	·	7.3 km	MPC · JPL
18367	1991 FS_{1}	—	March 17, 1991	La Silla	H. Debehogne	·	3.6 km	MPC · JPL
18368 Flandrau	1991 GZ_{1}	Flandrau	April 15, 1991	Palomar	C. S. Shoemaker, D. H. Levy	H	1.9 km	MPC · JPL
18369	1991 LM	—	June 13, 1991	Palomar	E. F. Helin	·	7.0 km	MPC · JPL
18370	1991 NS_{2}	—	July 12, 1991	Palomar	H. E. Holt	·	5.5 km	MPC · JPL
18371	1991 PH_{10}	—	August 7, 1991	Palomar	H. E. Holt	·	6.7 km	MPC · JPL
18372	1991 RF_{16}	—	September 15, 1991	Palomar	H. E. Holt	·	4.5 km	MPC · JPL
18373	1991 RQ_{16}	—	September 15, 1991	Palomar	H. E. Holt	·	3.1 km	MPC · JPL
18374	1991 RA_{18}	—	September 13, 1991	Palomar	H. E. Holt	·	7.8 km	MPC · JPL
18375	1991 RC_{27}	—	September 13, 1991	Palomar	H. E. Holt	EUN	6.0 km	MPC · JPL
18376 Quirk	1991 SQ	Quirk	September 30, 1991	Siding Spring	R. H. McNaught	·	5.2 km	MPC · JPL
18377 Vetter	1991 SH_{1}	Vetter	September 28, 1991	Siding Spring	R. H. McNaught	·	11 km	MPC · JPL
18378	1991 UX_{2}	—	October 31, 1991	Kushiro	S. Ueda, H. Kaneda	·	4.0 km	MPC · JPL
18379 Josévandam	1991 VJ_{6}	Josévandam	November 6, 1991	La Silla	E. W. Elst	·	6.7 km	MPC · JPL
18380	1991 VZ_{8}	—	November 4, 1991	Kitt Peak	Spacewatch	·	4.0 km	MPC · JPL
18381 Massenet	1991 YU	Massenet	December 30, 1991	Haute Provence	E. W. Elst	·	8.8 km	MPC · JPL
18382	1992 EG_{22}	—	March 1, 1992	La Silla	UESAC	·	3.5 km	MPC · JPL
18383	1992 ER_{28}	—	March 8, 1992	La Silla	UESAC	THM	5.9 km	MPC · JPL
18384	1992 ES_{28}	—	March 8, 1992	La Silla	UESAC	KOR	5.0 km	MPC · JPL
18385	1992 EG_{31}	—	March 1, 1992	La Silla	UESAC	EOS	5.6 km	MPC · JPL
18386	1992 EL_{35}	—	March 2, 1992	La Silla	UESAC	·	2.5 km	MPC · JPL
18387	1992 GN_{3}	—	April 4, 1992	La Silla	E. W. Elst	·	3.1 km	MPC · JPL
18388	1992 GX_{4}	—	April 4, 1992	La Silla	E. W. Elst	·	3.4 km	MPC · JPL
18389	1992 JU_{2}	—	May 4, 1992	La Silla	H. Debehogne	·	3.6 km	MPC · JPL
18390	1992 JD_{3}	—	May 7, 1992	La Silla	H. Debehogne	BAP	5.3 km	MPC · JPL
18391	1992 PO_{1}	—	August 8, 1992	Caussols	E. W. Elst	·	3.8 km	MPC · JPL
18392	1992 PT_{4}	—	August 2, 1992	Palomar	H. E. Holt	·	4.0 km	MPC · JPL
18393	1992 QB	—	August 19, 1992	Siding Spring	R. H. McNaught	PHO	3.9 km	MPC · JPL
18394	1992 RR_{5}	—	September 2, 1992	La Silla	E. W. Elst	·	4.5 km	MPC · JPL
18395 Schmiedmayer	1992 SH_{2}	Schmiedmayer	September 21, 1992	Tautenburg Observatory	L. D. Schmadel, F. Börngen	·	4.5 km	MPC · JPL
18396 Nellysachs	1992 SN_{2}	Nellysachs	September 21, 1992	Tautenburg Observatory	F. Börngen, L. D. Schmadel	NYS	4.7 km	MPC · JPL
18397	1992 SF_{14}	—	September 28, 1992	Palomar	H. E. Holt	·	6.0 km	MPC · JPL
18398 Bregenz	1992 SQ_{23}	Bregenz	September 23, 1992	Tautenburg Observatory	F. Börngen	·	3.2 km	MPC · JPL
18399 Tentoumushi	1992 WK_{1}	Tentoumushi	November 17, 1992	Kitami	K. Endate, K. Watanabe	TIR ·	23 km	MPC · JPL
18400 Muramatsushigeru	1992 WY_{3}	Muramatsushigeru	November 25, 1992	Geisei	T. Seki	·	4.4 km	MPC · JPL

== 18401–18500 ==
back to top

Designation			Discovery			Properties		Ref
Permanent	Provisional	Named after	Date	Site	Discoverer(s)	Category	Diam.	Ref
18401	1992 WE_{4}	—	November 21, 1992	Kushiro	S. Ueda, H. Kaneda	·	4.5 km	MPC · JPL
18402	1992 YU_{2}	—	December 26, 1992	Oohira	T. Urata	(5)	3.4 km	MPC · JPL
18403 Atsuhirotaisei	1993 AG	Atsuhirotaisei	January 13, 1993	Kitami	K. Endate, K. Watanabe	·	2.7 km	MPC · JPL
18404 Kenichi	1993 FQ_{2}	Kenichi	March 20, 1993	Kitami	K. Endate, K. Watanabe	·	7.3 km	MPC · JPL
18405	1993 FY_{12}	—	March 17, 1993	La Silla	UESAC	615	7.5 km	MPC · JPL
18406	1993 FT_{14}	—	March 17, 1993	La Silla	UESAC	·	3.0 km	MPC · JPL
18407	1993 FQ_{24}	—	March 21, 1993	La Silla	UESAC	·	4.3 km	MPC · JPL
18408	1993 FP_{30}	—	March 21, 1993	La Silla	UESAC	·	8.8 km	MPC · JPL
18409	1993 FF_{36}	—	March 19, 1993	La Silla	UESAC	·	1.9 km	MPC · JPL
18410	1993 FC_{51}	—	March 19, 1993	La Silla	UESAC	KOR	3.9 km	MPC · JPL
18411	1993 FB_{82}	—	March 19, 1993	La Silla	UESAC	·	6.6 km	MPC · JPL
18412 Kruszelnicki	1993 LX	Kruszelnicki	June 13, 1993	Siding Spring	R. H. McNaught	·	6.1 km	MPC · JPL
18413 Adamspencer	1993 LD_{1}	Adamspencer	June 13, 1993	Siding Spring	R. H. McNaught	EOS	5.9 km	MPC · JPL
18414	1993 OY_{6}	—	July 20, 1993	La Silla	E. W. Elst	·	4.0 km	MPC · JPL
18415	1993 PW_{5}	—	August 15, 1993	Caussols	E. W. Elst	·	2.9 km	MPC · JPL
18416	1993 QW	—	August 22, 1993	Palomar	E. F. Helin	PHO	2.1 km	MPC · JPL
18417	1993 QY_{9}	—	August 20, 1993	La Silla	E. W. Elst	·	1.6 km	MPC · JPL
18418 Ujibe	1993 TV_{1}	Ujibe	October 15, 1993	Kitami	K. Endate, K. Watanabe	·	3.4 km	MPC · JPL
18419	1993 TS_{20}	—	October 9, 1993	La Silla	E. W. Elst	·	6.2 km	MPC · JPL
18420	1993 TR_{25}	—	October 9, 1993	La Silla	E. W. Elst	NYS ·	4.4 km	MPC · JPL
18421	1993 TV_{34}	—	October 9, 1993	La Silla	E. W. Elst	·	2.8 km	MPC · JPL
18422	1993 UE_{6}	—	October 20, 1993	La Silla	E. W. Elst	(2076)	3.9 km	MPC · JPL
18423	1993 UF_{7}	—	October 20, 1993	La Silla	E. W. Elst	·	3.2 km	MPC · JPL
18424	1993 YG	—	December 17, 1993	Oizumi	T. Kobayashi	·	5.6 km	MPC · JPL
18425	1993 YL	—	December 18, 1993	Oizumi	T. Kobayashi	NYS	3.9 km	MPC · JPL
18426 Maffei	1993 YN_{2}	Maffei	December 18, 1993	Sormano	Colzani, E., Ventre, G.	·	3.7 km	MPC · JPL
18427	1994 AY	—	January 4, 1994	Oizumi	T. Kobayashi	NYS	3.5 km	MPC · JPL
18428	1994 AC_{1}	—	January 7, 1994	Oizumi	T. Kobayashi	·	3.2 km	MPC · JPL
18429	1994 AO_{1}	—	January 8, 1994	Dynic	A. Sugie	·	10 km	MPC · JPL
18430 Balzac	1994 AK_{16}	Balzac	January 14, 1994	Tautenburg Observatory	F. Börngen	·	3.6 km	MPC · JPL
18431 Stazzema	1994 BM	Stazzema	January 16, 1994	Cima Ekar	M. Tombelli, A. Boattini	·	5.8 km	MPC · JPL
18432	1994 CJ_{2}	—	February 13, 1994	Oizumi	T. Kobayashi	·	3.4 km	MPC · JPL
18433	1994 EQ	—	March 4, 1994	Oizumi	T. Kobayashi	EUN	4.6 km	MPC · JPL
18434 Mikesandras	1994 EW_{7}	Mikesandras	March 12, 1994	Palomar	C. S. Shoemaker, D. H. Levy	PHO	4.6 km	MPC · JPL
18435	1994 GW_{10}	—	April 14, 1994	Palomar	PCAS	·	3.8 km	MPC · JPL
18436	1994 GY_{10}	—	April 14, 1994	Palomar	PCAS	·	7.5 km	MPC · JPL
18437	1994 JR	—	May 5, 1994	Palomar	E. F. Helin	EUN	5.8 km	MPC · JPL
18438	1994 JM_{6}	—	May 4, 1994	Kitt Peak	Spacewatch	PAD	5.0 km	MPC · JPL
18439	1994 LJ_{1}	—	June 9, 1994	Palomar	E. F. Helin	·	11 km	MPC · JPL
18440	1994 NV_{1}	—	July 8, 1994	Caussols	E. W. Elst	·	4.2 km	MPC · JPL
18441 Cittàdivinci	1994 PE	Cittàdivinci	August 5, 1994	San Marcello	A. Boattini, M. Tombelli	EOS	6.0 km	MPC · JPL
18442	1994 PK_{3}	—	August 10, 1994	La Silla	E. W. Elst	KOR	5.7 km	MPC · JPL
18443	1994 PW_{8}	—	August 10, 1994	La Silla	E. W. Elst	EOS	4.8 km	MPC · JPL
18444	1994 PL_{10}	—	August 10, 1994	La Silla	E. W. Elst	·	8.9 km	MPC · JPL
18445	1994 PC_{12}	—	August 10, 1994	La Silla	E. W. Elst	(5651)	7.9 km	MPC · JPL
18446	1994 PN_{13}	—	August 10, 1994	La Silla	E. W. Elst	THM	6.8 km	MPC · JPL
18447	1994 PU_{13}	—	August 10, 1994	La Silla	E. W. Elst	·	6.6 km	MPC · JPL
18448	1994 PW_{17}	—	August 10, 1994	La Silla	E. W. Elst	·	7.0 km	MPC · JPL
18449 Rikwouters	1994 PT_{19}	Rikwouters	August 12, 1994	La Silla	E. W. Elst	·	9.4 km	MPC · JPL
18450	1994 PG_{27}	—	August 12, 1994	La Silla	E. W. Elst	·	8.0 km	MPC · JPL
18451	1994 PZ_{27}	—	August 12, 1994	La Silla	E. W. Elst	·	8.3 km	MPC · JPL
18452	1994 PL_{33}	—	August 10, 1994	La Silla	E. W. Elst	HYG	7.0 km	MPC · JPL
18453 Nishiyamayukio	1994 TT	Nishiyamayukio	October 2, 1994	Kitami	K. Endate, K. Watanabe	·	3.7 km	MPC · JPL
18454	1995 BF_{1}	—	January 23, 1995	Kiyosato	S. Otomo	·	3.8 km	MPC · JPL
18455	1995 DF	—	February 20, 1995	Oizumi	T. Kobayashi	·	2.6 km	MPC · JPL
18456 Mišík	1995 ES	Mišík	March 8, 1995	Kleť	M. Tichý, J. Tichá	·	2.6 km	MPC · JPL
18457 Syoheiyamamoto	1995 EX_{7}	Syoheiyamamoto	March 5, 1995	Nyukasa	M. Hirasawa, S. Suzuki	·	3.1 km	MPC · JPL
18458 Caesar	1995 EY_{8}	Caesar	March 5, 1995	Tautenburg Observatory	F. Börngen	·	2.4 km	MPC · JPL
18459	1995 FD_{1}	—	March 28, 1995	Kushiro	S. Ueda, H. Kaneda	NYS	3.7 km	MPC · JPL
18460 Pecková	1995 PG	Pecková	August 5, 1995	Ondřejov	L. Kotková	·	3.2 km	MPC · JPL
18461 Seiichikanno	1995 QQ	Seiichikanno	August 17, 1995	Nanyo	T. Okuni	MAR	6.5 km	MPC · JPL
18462 Riccò	1995 QS_{2}	Riccò	August 26, 1995	Bologna	San Vittore	KOR	3.9 km	MPC · JPL
18463	1995 SV_{16}	—	September 18, 1995	Kitt Peak	Spacewatch	·	5.9 km	MPC · JPL
18464	1995 SK_{23}	—	September 19, 1995	Kitt Peak	Spacewatch	GEF	3.8 km	MPC · JPL
18465	1995 SB_{34}	—	September 22, 1995	Kitt Peak	Spacewatch	HOF	7.4 km	MPC · JPL
18466	1995 SU_{37}	—	September 24, 1995	Kitt Peak	Spacewatch	(18466)	6.4 km	MPC · JPL
18467 Nagatatsu	1995 SX_{52}	Nagatatsu	September 22, 1995	Kitami	K. Endate, K. Watanabe	·	6.2 km	MPC · JPL
18468	1995 UE_{8}	—	October 27, 1995	Oizumi	T. Kobayashi	·	7.1 km	MPC · JPL
18469 Hakodate	1995 UC_{9}	Hakodate	October 20, 1995	Chichibu	N. Satō, T. Urata	KOR	4.0 km	MPC · JPL
18470	1995 UX_{44}	—	October 27, 1995	Kushiro	S. Ueda, H. Kaneda	KOR	4.4 km	MPC · JPL
18471	1995 UZ_{45}	—	October 20, 1995	Caussols	E. W. Elst	·	9.6 km	MPC · JPL
18472 Hatada	1995 VA_{1}	Hatada	November 12, 1995	Kitami	K. Endate, K. Watanabe	·	5.4 km	MPC · JPL
18473 Kikuchijun	1995 VK_{1}	Kikuchijun	November 15, 1995	Kitami	K. Endate, K. Watanabe	·	4.4 km	MPC · JPL
18474	1995 WV_{3}	—	November 18, 1995	Nachi-Katsuura	Y. Shimizu, T. Urata	·	10 km	MPC · JPL
18475	1995 WM_{7}	—	November 27, 1995	Oizumi	T. Kobayashi	TEL	5.8 km	MPC · JPL
18476	1995 WR_{7}	—	November 27, 1995	Oizumi	T. Kobayashi	VER	9.1 km	MPC · JPL
18477	1995 WA_{11}	—	November 16, 1995	Kitt Peak	Spacewatch	LIX	11 km	MPC · JPL
18478	1995 WT_{15}	—	November 17, 1995	Kitt Peak	Spacewatch	KOR	5.3 km	MPC · JPL
18479	1995 XR	—	December 12, 1995	Oizumi	T. Kobayashi	EOS	8.4 km	MPC · JPL
18480	1995 YB	—	December 17, 1995	Oizumi	T. Kobayashi	·	4.6 km	MPC · JPL
18481	1995 YH	—	December 17, 1995	Oizumi	T. Kobayashi	EOS	11 km	MPC · JPL
18482	1995 YO	—	December 19, 1995	Oizumi	T. Kobayashi	VER	14 km	MPC · JPL
18483	1995 YY_{2}	—	December 26, 1995	Oizumi	T. Kobayashi	LIX	15 km	MPC · JPL
18484	1995 YB_{3}	—	December 27, 1995	Haleakala	NEAT	THM	9.9 km	MPC · JPL
18485	1996 AB	—	January 1, 1996	Oizumi	T. Kobayashi	·	13 km	MPC · JPL
18486	1996 AS_{2}	—	January 13, 1996	Oizumi	T. Kobayashi	THM	9.0 km	MPC · JPL
18487	1996 AU_{3}	—	January 13, 1996	Kushiro	S. Ueda, H. Kaneda	EUN	7.1 km	MPC · JPL
18488	1996 AY_{3}	—	January 13, 1996	Chichibu	N. Satō, T. Urata	·	25 km	MPC · JPL
18489	1996 BV_{2}	—	January 26, 1996	Kashihara	F. Uto	·	6.1 km	MPC · JPL
18490	1996 BG_{17}	—	January 24, 1996	Socorro	Lincoln Lab ETS	DOR	9.1 km	MPC · JPL
18491	1996 DP_{2}	—	February 23, 1996	Oizumi	T. Kobayashi	·	3.1 km	MPC · JPL
18492	1996 GS_{2}	—	April 8, 1996	Xinglong	SCAP	·	2.6 km	MPC · JPL
18493 Demoleon	1996 HV_{9}	Demoleon	April 17, 1996	La Silla	E. W. Elst	L5	33 km	MPC · JPL
18494	1996 HH_{10}	—	April 17, 1996	La Silla	E. W. Elst	·	1.8 km	MPC · JPL
18495	1996 HH_{24}	—	April 20, 1996	La Silla	E. W. Elst	·	3.0 km	MPC · JPL
18496	1996 JN_{1}	—	May 9, 1996	Siding Spring	R. H. McNaught	NYS	4.5 km	MPC · JPL
18497 Nevězice	1996 LK_{1}	Nevězice	June 11, 1996	Kleť	M. Tichý, Z. Moravec	·	3.3 km	MPC · JPL
18498 Cesaro	1996 MN	Cesaro	June 22, 1996	Prescott	P. G. Comba	·	2.6 km	MPC · JPL
18499 Showalter	1996 MR	Showalter	June 22, 1996	Haleakala	NEAT	·	2.8 km	MPC · JPL
18500	1996 NX_{3}	—	July 14, 1996	La Silla	E. W. Elst	·	4.2 km	MPC · JPL

== 18501–18600 ==
back to top

Designation			Discovery			Properties		Ref
Permanent	Provisional	Named after	Date	Site	Discoverer(s)	Category	Diam.	Ref
18501 Luria	1996 OB	Luria	July 16, 1996	Farra d'Isonzo	Farra d'Isonzo	·	2.8 km	MPC · JPL
18502	1996 PK_{1}	—	August 11, 1996	Rand	G. R. Viscome	NYS	2.3 km	MPC · JPL
18503	1996 PY_{4}	—	August 15, 1996	Haleakala	NEAT	·	3.5 km	MPC · JPL
18504	1996 PB_{5}	—	August 15, 1996	Haleakala	NEAT	·	3.1 km	MPC · JPL
18505 Caravelli	1996 PG_{5}	Caravelli	August 9, 1996	Bologna	San Vittore	·	2.9 km	MPC · JPL
18506	1996 PY_{6}	—	August 15, 1996	Macquarie	R. H. McNaught, Child, J. B.	PHO	3.9 km	MPC · JPL
18507	1996 QM_{1}	—	August 18, 1996	Lake Clear	Williams, K. A.	·	3.3 km	MPC · JPL
18508	1996 RJ_{2}	—	September 8, 1996	Haleakala	NEAT	V	2.3 km	MPC · JPL
18509 Bellini	1996 RB_{4}	Bellini	September 14, 1996	Colleverde	V. S. Casulli	EUN	5.3 km	MPC · JPL
18510 Chasles	1996 SN	Chasles	September 16, 1996	Prescott	P. G. Comba	MIS	5.5 km	MPC · JPL
18511	1996 SH_{4}	—	September 19, 1996	Xinglong	SCAP	·	6.2 km	MPC · JPL
18512	1996 SO_{7}	—	September 17, 1996	Kiyosato	S. Otomo	NYS	3.6 km	MPC · JPL
18513	1996 TS_{5}	—	October 7, 1996	Catalina Station	T. B. Spahr	PHO	4.1 km	MPC · JPL
18514	1996 TE_{11}	—	October 14, 1996	Siding Spring	R. H. McNaught	·	2.3 km	MPC · JPL
18515	1996 TL_{14}	—	October 9, 1996	Kushiro	S. Ueda, H. Kaneda	·	8.4 km	MPC · JPL
18516	1996 TL_{29}	—	October 7, 1996	Kitt Peak	Spacewatch	·	4.9 km	MPC · JPL
18517	1996 VG_{2}	—	November 6, 1996	Oizumi	T. Kobayashi	NYS	5.1 km	MPC · JPL
18518	1996 VT_{3}	—	November 2, 1996	Xinglong	SCAP	·	6.7 km	MPC · JPL
18519	1996 VH_{4}	—	November 8, 1996	Xinglong	SCAP	EUN	4.9 km	MPC · JPL
18520 Wolfratshausen	1996 VK_{4}	Wolfratshausen	November 6, 1996	Chichibu	N. Satō	·	5.1 km	MPC · JPL
18521	1996 VV_{5}	—	November 14, 1996	Oizumi	T. Kobayashi	·	6.5 km	MPC · JPL
18522	1996 VA_{6}	—	November 15, 1996	Oizumi	T. Kobayashi	EUN	3.6 km	MPC · JPL
18523	1996 VA_{7}	—	November 2, 1996	Xinglong	SCAP	·	3.8 km	MPC · JPL
18524 Tagatoshihiro	1996 VE_{8}	Tagatoshihiro	November 6, 1996	Kitami	K. Endate, K. Watanabe	·	4.6 km	MPC · JPL
18525	1996 VO_{8}	—	November 7, 1996	Kushiro	S. Ueda, H. Kaneda	NYS	4.6 km	MPC · JPL
18526	1996 VB_{30}	—	November 7, 1996	Kushiro	S. Ueda, H. Kaneda	·	4.0 km	MPC · JPL
18527	1996 VJ_{30}	—	November 7, 1996	Kushiro	S. Ueda, H. Kaneda	V · moon	3.3 km	MPC · JPL
18528	1996 VX_{30}	—	November 2, 1996	Xinglong	SCAP	·	3.0 km	MPC · JPL
18529 Liangdongcai	1996 WK_{3}	Liangdongcai	November 28, 1996	Xinglong	SCAP	·	4.0 km	MPC · JPL
18530	1996 XS_{1}	—	December 2, 1996	Oizumi	T. Kobayashi	·	7.7 km	MPC · JPL
18531 Strakonice	1996 XM_{2}	Strakonice	December 4, 1996	Kleť	M. Tichý, Z. Moravec	·	2.9 km	MPC · JPL
18532	1996 XW_{2}	—	December 3, 1996	Oizumi	T. Kobayashi	EUN	3.9 km	MPC · JPL
18533	1996 XJ_{6}	—	December 3, 1996	Nachi-Katsuura	Y. Shimizu, T. Urata	·	3.9 km	MPC · JPL
18534	1996 XE_{12}	—	December 4, 1996	Kitt Peak	Spacewatch	KOR	3.9 km	MPC · JPL
18535	1996 XQ_{13}	—	December 9, 1996	Kleť	Kleť	·	7.9 km	MPC · JPL
18536	1996 XN_{15}	—	December 10, 1996	Xinglong	SCAP	·	5.7 km	MPC · JPL
18537	1996 XH_{18}	—	December 7, 1996	Kitt Peak	Spacewatch	GEF	5.3 km	MPC · JPL
18538	1996 XY_{18}	—	December 6, 1996	Nachi-Katsuura	Y. Shimizu, T. Urata	·	5.7 km	MPC · JPL
18539	1996 XX_{30}	—	December 14, 1996	Oizumi	T. Kobayashi	(5)	3.6 km	MPC · JPL
18540	1996 XK_{31}	—	December 14, 1996	Oizumi	T. Kobayashi	·	4.8 km	MPC · JPL
18541	1996 YA_{1}	—	December 20, 1996	Oizumi	T. Kobayashi	KOR	3.5 km	MPC · JPL
18542 Broglio	1996 YP_{3}	Broglio	December 29, 1996	Sormano	A. Testa, F. Manca	MAR	4.5 km	MPC · JPL
18543	1997 AE	—	January 2, 1997	Oizumi	T. Kobayashi	·	5.6 km	MPC · JPL
18544	1997 AA_{2}	—	January 3, 1997	Oizumi	T. Kobayashi	·	6.7 km	MPC · JPL
18545	1997 AO_{2}	—	January 3, 1997	Oizumi	T. Kobayashi	EOS	8.1 km	MPC · JPL
18546	1997 AP_{4}	—	January 6, 1997	Oizumi	T. Kobayashi	NYS	4.3 km	MPC · JPL
18547	1997 AU_{5}	—	January 7, 1997	Oizumi	T. Kobayashi	EOS	7.9 km	MPC · JPL
18548 Christoffel	1997 AN_{12}	Christoffel	January 10, 1997	Prescott	P. G. Comba	·	4.0 km	MPC · JPL
18549	1997 AD_{13}	—	January 11, 1997	Oizumi	T. Kobayashi	·	5.1 km	MPC · JPL
18550 Maoyisheng	1997 AN_{14}	Maoyisheng	January 9, 1997	Xinglong	SCAP	·	9.3 km	MPC · JPL
18551 Bovet	1997 AQ_{17}	Bovet	January 13, 1997	Farra d'Isonzo	Farra d'Isonzo	·	6.9 km	MPC · JPL
18552	1997 AM_{21}	—	January 13, 1997	Nachi-Katsuura	Y. Shimizu, T. Urata	GEF · slow	4.9 km	MPC · JPL
18553 Kinkakuji	1997 AZ_{21}	Kinkakuji	January 6, 1997	Chichibu	N. Satō	THM	9.9 km	MPC · JPL
18554	1997 BO_{1}	—	January 29, 1997	Oizumi	T. Kobayashi	·	7.4 km	MPC · JPL
18555 Courant	1997 CN_{4}	Courant	February 4, 1997	Prescott	P. G. Comba	KOR	4.1 km	MPC · JPL
18556 Battiato	1997 CC_{7}	Battiato	February 7, 1997	Sormano	P. Sicoli, F. Manca	·	6.2 km	MPC · JPL
18557	1997 CQ_{11}	—	February 3, 1997	Kitt Peak	Spacewatch	KOR	4.8 km	MPC · JPL
18558	1997 CO_{19}	—	February 6, 1997	Oohira	T. Urata	HYG	8.4 km	MPC · JPL
18559	1997 EN_{2}	—	March 4, 1997	Oizumi	T. Kobayashi	·	12 km	MPC · JPL
18560 Coxeter	1997 EO_{7}	Coxeter	March 7, 1997	Prescott	P. G. Comba	·	18 km	MPC · JPL
18561 Fengningding	1997 EY_{34}	Fengningding	March 4, 1997	Socorro	LINEAR	KOR	4.2 km	MPC · JPL
18562 Ellenkey	1997 EK_{54}	Ellenkey	March 8, 1997	La Silla	E. W. Elst	·	12 km	MPC · JPL
18563 Danigoldman	1997 FC_{3}	Danigoldman	March 31, 1997	Socorro	LINEAR	KOR	6.1 km	MPC · JPL
18564 Caseyo	1997 GO_{6}	Caseyo	April 2, 1997	Socorro	LINEAR	THM	8.9 km	MPC · JPL
18565 Selg	1997 GP_{35}	Selg	April 6, 1997	Socorro	LINEAR	HYG	8.6 km	MPC · JPL
18566	1997 RS_{3}	—	September 1, 1997	Caussols	ODAS	·	9.6 km	MPC · JPL
18567 Segenthau	1997 SS_{4}	Segenthau	September 27, 1997	Starkenburg Observatory	Starkenburg	HOF	8.6 km	MPC · JPL
18568 Thuillot	1997 TL_{2}	Thuillot	October 3, 1997	Caussols	ODAS	·	17 km	MPC · JPL
18569	1997 UC_{11}	—	October 26, 1997	Oohira	T. Urata	PHO	4.6 km	MPC · JPL
18570	1997 VB_{6}	—	November 9, 1997	Oizumi	T. Kobayashi	·	2.2 km	MPC · JPL
18571	1997 WQ_{21}	—	November 30, 1997	Oizumi	T. Kobayashi	PHO	10 km	MPC · JPL
18572 Rocher	1997 WQ_{22}	Rocher	November 28, 1997	Caussols	ODAS	·	2.2 km	MPC · JPL
18573	1997 WM_{23}	—	November 28, 1997	Caussols	ODAS	KOR	4.7 km	MPC · JPL
18574 Jeansimon	1997 WO_{23}	Jeansimon	November 28, 1997	Caussols	ODAS	·	5.4 km	MPC · JPL
18575	1997 WS_{31}	—	November 29, 1997	Socorro	LINEAR	·	2.0 km	MPC · JPL
18576	1997 WA_{42}	—	November 29, 1997	Socorro	LINEAR	·	2.7 km	MPC · JPL
18577	1997 XH	—	December 3, 1997	Caussols	ODAS	·	3.2 km	MPC · JPL
18578	1997 XP	—	December 3, 1997	Oizumi	T. Kobayashi	·	3.4 km	MPC · JPL
18579 Duongtuyenvu	1997 XY_{6}	Duongtuyenvu	December 5, 1997	Caussols	ODAS	·	4.9 km	MPC · JPL
18580	1997 XN_{8}	—	December 7, 1997	Caussols	ODAS	·	3.7 km	MPC · JPL
18581 Batllo	1997 XV_{8}	Batllo	December 7, 1997	Caussols	ODAS	V	4.2 km	MPC · JPL
18582	1997 XK_{9}	—	December 4, 1997	Xinglong	SCAP	H · slow	4.6 km	MPC · JPL
18583 Francescopedani	1997 XN_{10}	Francescopedani	December 7, 1997	Cima Ekar	A. Boattini, M. Tombelli	NYS	2.9 km	MPC · JPL
18584	1997 YB_{2}	—	December 21, 1997	Oizumi	T. Kobayashi	·	2.8 km	MPC · JPL
18585	1997 YE_{2}	—	December 21, 1997	Oizumi	T. Kobayashi	·	3.9 km	MPC · JPL
18586	1997 YD_{3}	—	December 24, 1997	Oizumi	T. Kobayashi	·	2.3 km	MPC · JPL
18587	1997 YR_{5}	—	December 25, 1997	Oizumi	T. Kobayashi	·	2.8 km	MPC · JPL
18588	1997 YO_{9}	—	December 25, 1997	Haleakala	NEAT	V	2.5 km	MPC · JPL
18589	1997 YL_{10}	—	December 28, 1997	Oizumi	T. Kobayashi	·	2.2 km	MPC · JPL
18590	1997 YO_{10}	—	December 28, 1997	Oizumi	T. Kobayashi	·	5.0 km	MPC · JPL
18591	1997 YT_{11}	—	December 30, 1997	Oizumi	T. Kobayashi	EUN	5.2 km	MPC · JPL
18592	1997 YO_{18}	—	December 24, 1997	Xinglong	SCAP	·	4.7 km	MPC · JPL
18593 Wangzhongcheng	1998 AG_{11}	Wangzhongcheng	January 5, 1998	Xinglong	SCAP	·	5.2 km	MPC · JPL
18594	1998 BJ	—	January 16, 1998	Nachi-Katsuura	Y. Shimizu, T. Urata	·	2.5 km	MPC · JPL
18595	1998 BR_{1}	—	January 19, 1998	Oizumi	T. Kobayashi	·	12 km	MPC · JPL
18596 Superbus	1998 BA_{4}	Superbus	January 21, 1998	Colleverde	V. S. Casulli	NYS	3.3 km	MPC · JPL
18597	1998 BE_{8}	—	January 25, 1998	Oizumi	T. Kobayashi	·	3.0 km	MPC · JPL
18598	1998 BH_{8}	—	January 25, 1998	Oizumi	T. Kobayashi	·	8.9 km	MPC · JPL
18599	1998 BK_{8}	—	January 25, 1998	Oizumi	T. Kobayashi	·	2.8 km	MPC · JPL
18600	1998 BK_{10}	—	January 24, 1998	Woomera	F. B. Zoltowski	(5)	4.2 km	MPC · JPL

== 18601–18700 ==
back to top

Designation			Discovery			Properties		Ref
Permanent	Provisional	Named after	Date	Site	Discoverer(s)	Category	Diam.	Ref
18601 Zafar	1998 BL_{11}	Zafar	January 23, 1998	Socorro	LINEAR	NYS	3.0 km	MPC · JPL
18602 Lagillespie	1998 BX_{12}	Lagillespie	January 23, 1998	Socorro	LINEAR	NYS	2.7 km	MPC · JPL
18603	1998 BM_{25}	—	January 28, 1998	Oizumi	T. Kobayashi	·	3.2 km	MPC · JPL
18604	1998 BK_{26}	—	January 28, 1998	Caussols	ODAS	·	2.2 km	MPC · JPL
18605 Jacqueslaskar	1998 BL_{26}	Jacqueslaskar	January 28, 1998	Caussols	ODAS	·	3.5 km	MPC · JPL
18606	1998 BS_{33}	—	January 31, 1998	Oizumi	T. Kobayashi	·	3.4 km	MPC · JPL
18607	1998 BT_{33}	—	January 31, 1998	Oizumi	T. Kobayashi	·	5.1 km	MPC · JPL
18608	1998 BU_{45}	—	January 25, 1998	Kitt Peak	Spacewatch	NYS	2.7 km	MPC · JPL
18609 Shinobuyama	1998 BN_{48}	Shinobuyama	January 30, 1998	Geisei	T. Seki	·	4.8 km	MPC · JPL
18610 Arthurdent	1998 CC_{2}	Arthurdent	February 7, 1998	Starkenburg Observatory	Starkenburg	·	3.5 km	MPC · JPL
18611 Baudelaire	1998 CB_{3}	Baudelaire	February 6, 1998	La Silla	E. W. Elst	NYS	6.5 km	MPC · JPL
18612	1998 CK_{3}	—	February 6, 1998	La Silla	E. W. Elst	NYS	4.1 km	MPC · JPL
18613	1998 DR	—	February 19, 1998	Kleť	Kleť	·	5.0 km	MPC · JPL
18614	1998 DN_{2}	—	February 20, 1998	Caussols	ODAS	·	9.5 km	MPC · JPL
18615	1998 DJ_{5}	—	February 22, 1998	Haleakala	NEAT	·	6.8 km	MPC · JPL
18616	1998 DR_{5}	—	February 22, 1998	Haleakala	NEAT	·	13 km	MPC · JPL
18617 Puntel	1998 DY_{9}	Puntel	February 24, 1998	Les Tardieux Obs.	Boeuf, M.	·	2.9 km	MPC · JPL
18618	1998 DD_{10}	—	February 22, 1998	Haleakala	NEAT	·	4.3 km	MPC · JPL
18619	1998 DG_{10}	—	February 22, 1998	Haleakala	NEAT	·	3.2 km	MPC · JPL
18620	1998 DS_{10}	—	February 24, 1998	Haleakala	NEAT	·	1.6 km	MPC · JPL
18621	1998 DD_{12}	—	February 23, 1998	Kitt Peak	Spacewatch	·	3.4 km	MPC · JPL
18622	1998 DN_{13}	—	February 25, 1998	Haleakala	NEAT	·	7.5 km	MPC · JPL
18623 Pises	1998 DR_{13}	Pises	February 27, 1998	Pises	B. Gaillard, J.-M. Lopez	KOR	4.7 km	MPC · JPL
18624 Prévert	1998 DV_{13}	Prévert	February 27, 1998	Caussols	ODAS	·	8.0 km	MPC · JPL
18625	1998 DZ_{13}	—	February 27, 1998	Caussols	ODAS	·	2.2 km	MPC · JPL
18626 Michaelcarr	1998 DO_{23}	Michaelcarr	February 27, 1998	Caussols	ODAS	H	1.7 km	MPC · JPL
18627 Rogerbonnet	1998 DH_{33}	Rogerbonnet	February 27, 1998	Cima Ekar	M. Tombelli, C. Casacci	·	6.6 km	MPC · JPL
18628 Taniasagrati	1998 DJ_{33}	Taniasagrati	February 27, 1998	Cima Ekar	G. Forti, M. Tombelli	·	2.8 km	MPC · JPL
18629	1998 DZ_{33}	—	February 27, 1998	La Silla	E. W. Elst	·	4.1 km	MPC · JPL
18630	1998 DT_{34}	—	February 27, 1998	La Silla	E. W. Elst	·	2.6 km	MPC · JPL
18631 Maurogherardini	1998 DQ_{35}	Maurogherardini	February 27, 1998	Cima Ekar	A. Boattini, M. Tombelli	EUN	7.4 km	MPC · JPL
18632 Danielsson	1998 DN_{37}	Danielsson	February 28, 1998	La Silla	C.-I. Lagerkvist	·	6.9 km	MPC · JPL
18633	1998 EU	—	March 2, 1998	Caussols	ODAS	·	5.3 km	MPC · JPL
18634 Champigneulles	1998 EQ_{1}	Champigneulles	March 2, 1998	Caussols	ODAS	·	4.0 km	MPC · JPL
18635 Frouard	1998 EX_{1}	Frouard	March 2, 1998	Caussols	ODAS	·	3.8 km	MPC · JPL
18636 Villedepompey	1998 EF_{2}	Villedepompey	March 2, 1998	Caussols	ODAS	KOR	5.1 km	MPC · JPL
18637 Liverdun	1998 EJ_{2}	Liverdun	March 2, 1998	Caussols	ODAS	EUN	2.9 km	MPC · JPL
18638 Nouet	1998 EP_{3}	Nouet	March 2, 1998	Caussols	ODAS	·	8.7 km	MPC · JPL
18639 Aoyunzhiyuanzhe	1998 ER_{8}	Aoyunzhiyuanzhe	March 5, 1998	Xinglong	SCAP	·	4.3 km	MPC · JPL
18640	1998 EF_{9}	—	March 7, 1998	Xinglong	SCAP	·	6.7 km	MPC · JPL
18641	1998 EG_{10}	—	March 6, 1998	Gekko	T. Kagawa	·	3.7 km	MPC · JPL
18642	1998 EF_{12}	—	March 1, 1998	La Silla	E. W. Elst	·	2.5 km	MPC · JPL
18643 van Rysselberghe	1998 EK_{12}	van Rysselberghe	March 1, 1998	La Silla	E. W. Elst	·	5.8 km	MPC · JPL
18644 Arashiyama	1998 EX_{14}	Arashiyama	March 2, 1998	Geisei	T. Seki	·	3.8 km	MPC · JPL
18645	1998 EM_{19}	—	March 3, 1998	La Silla	E. W. Elst	THM	10 km	MPC · JPL
18646	1998 ED_{21}	—	March 3, 1998	La Silla	E. W. Elst	·	4.4 km	MPC · JPL
18647 Václavhübner	1998 FD_{2}	Václavhübner	March 21, 1998	Ondřejov	P. Pravec	·	2.7 km	MPC · JPL
18648	1998 FW_{9}	—	March 24, 1998	Caussols	ODAS	PHO	1.7 km	MPC · JPL
18649 Fabrega	1998 FU_{10}	Fabrega	March 24, 1998	Caussols	ODAS	GEF	4.0 km	MPC · JPL
18650	1998 FX_{10}	—	March 24, 1998	Caussols	ODAS	·	6.9 km	MPC · JPL
18651	1998 FP_{11}	—	March 22, 1998	Nachi-Katsuura	Y. Shimizu, T. Urata	·	4.0 km	MPC · JPL
18652	1998 FD_{15}	—	March 21, 1998	Kushiro	S. Ueda, H. Kaneda	·	4.7 km	MPC · JPL
18653 Christagünt	1998 FW_{15}	Christagünt	March 28, 1998	Starkenburg Observatory	Starkenburg	·	3.2 km	MPC · JPL
18654	1998 FR_{22}	—	March 20, 1998	Socorro	LINEAR	EUN	6.3 km	MPC · JPL
18655	1998 FS_{26}	—	March 20, 1998	Socorro	LINEAR	·	5.3 km	MPC · JPL
18656 Mergler	1998 FW_{29}	Mergler	March 20, 1998	Socorro	LINEAR	V	4.3 km	MPC · JPL
18657	1998 FE_{30}	—	March 20, 1998	Socorro	LINEAR	AGN	5.4 km	MPC · JPL
18658 Rajdev	1998 FX_{31}	Rajdev	March 20, 1998	Socorro	LINEAR	NYS	3.7 km	MPC · JPL
18659 Megangross	1998 FD_{33}	Megangross	March 20, 1998	Socorro	LINEAR	·	5.5 km	MPC · JPL
18660	1998 FL_{34}	—	March 20, 1998	Socorro	LINEAR	·	7.5 km	MPC · JPL
18661 Zoccoli	1998 FT_{34}	Zoccoli	March 20, 1998	Socorro	LINEAR	·	2.1 km	MPC · JPL
18662 Erinwhite	1998 FV_{42}	Erinwhite	March 20, 1998	Socorro	LINEAR	KOR	4.8 km	MPC · JPL
18663 Lynnta	1998 FW_{42}	Lynnta	March 20, 1998	Socorro	LINEAR	·	5.1 km	MPC · JPL
18664 Rafaelta	1998 FA_{43}	Rafaelta	March 20, 1998	Socorro	LINEAR	·	5.2 km	MPC · JPL
18665 Sheenahayes	1998 FK_{49}	Sheenahayes	March 20, 1998	Socorro	LINEAR	·	3.9 km	MPC · JPL
18666	1998 FT_{53}	—	March 20, 1998	Socorro	LINEAR	·	7.3 km	MPC · JPL
18667	1998 FF_{62}	—	March 20, 1998	Socorro	LINEAR	·	7.6 km	MPC · JPL
18668 Gottesman	1998 FU_{62}	Gottesman	March 20, 1998	Socorro	LINEAR	·	6.1 km	MPC · JPL
18669 Lalitpatel	1998 FP_{63}	Lalitpatel	March 20, 1998	Socorro	LINEAR	THM	6.8 km	MPC · JPL
18670 Shantanugaur	1998 FM_{64}	Shantanugaur	March 20, 1998	Socorro	LINEAR	THM	7.3 km	MPC · JPL
18671 Zacharyrice	1998 FX_{64}	Zacharyrice	March 20, 1998	Socorro	LINEAR	·	5.1 km	MPC · JPL
18672 Ashleyamini	1998 FY_{65}	Ashleyamini	March 20, 1998	Socorro	LINEAR	(5)	4.0 km	MPC · JPL
18673	1998 FH_{66}	—	March 20, 1998	Socorro	LINEAR	THM	9.9 km	MPC · JPL
18674	1998 FG_{69}	—	March 20, 1998	Socorro	LINEAR	EOS · fast	9.8 km	MPC · JPL
18675 Amiamini	1998 FJ_{70}	Amiamini	March 20, 1998	Socorro	LINEAR	·	4.1 km	MPC · JPL
18676 Zdeňkaplavcová	1998 FE_{73}	Zdeňkaplavcová	March 30, 1998	Ondřejov	P. Pravec	(5)	2.8 km	MPC · JPL
18677	1998 FZ_{83}	—	March 24, 1998	Socorro	LINEAR	·	6.8 km	MPC · JPL
18678	1998 FS_{85}	—	March 24, 1998	Socorro	LINEAR	·	8.2 km	MPC · JPL
18679 Heatherenae	1998 FW_{102}	Heatherenae	March 31, 1998	Socorro	LINEAR	·	4.0 km	MPC · JPL
18680 Weirather	1998 FS_{103}	Weirather	March 31, 1998	Socorro	LINEAR	V	2.9 km	MPC · JPL
18681 Caseylipp	1998 FW_{103}	Caseylipp	March 31, 1998	Socorro	LINEAR	·	2.2 km	MPC · JPL
18682	1998 FH_{107}	—	March 31, 1998	Socorro	LINEAR	EOS	6.7 km	MPC · JPL
18683	1998 FB_{111}	—	March 31, 1998	Socorro	LINEAR	·	5.7 km	MPC · JPL
18684	1998 FW_{116}	—	March 31, 1998	Socorro	LINEAR	EOS	7.5 km	MPC · JPL
18685	1998 FL_{117}	—	March 31, 1998	Socorro	LINEAR	EUN	4.4 km	MPC · JPL
18686	1998 FZ_{119}	—	March 20, 1998	Socorro	LINEAR	·	9.6 km	MPC · JPL
18687	1998 FA_{120}	—	March 20, 1998	Socorro	LINEAR	EOS	5.4 km	MPC · JPL
18688	1998 FA_{123}	—	March 20, 1998	Socorro	LINEAR	·	7.3 km	MPC · JPL
18689 Rodrick	1998 FR_{124}	Rodrick	March 24, 1998	Socorro	LINEAR	KOR	5.1 km	MPC · JPL
18690	1998 GB_{10}	—	April 2, 1998	Socorro	LINEAR	·	13 km	MPC · JPL
18691	1998 HE_{1}	—	April 17, 1998	Xinglong	SCAP	·	5.6 km	MPC · JPL
18692	1998 HJ_{14}	—	April 22, 1998	Haleakala	NEAT	EOS	6.5 km	MPC · JPL
18693	1998 HS_{19}	—	April 29, 1998	Haleakala	NEAT	·	6.1 km	MPC · JPL
18694	1998 HQ_{24}	—	April 23, 1998	Višnjan Observatory	Višnjan	·	8.1 km	MPC · JPL
18695	1998 HH_{27}	—	April 21, 1998	Kitt Peak	Spacewatch	AGN	4.6 km	MPC · JPL
18696	1998 HB_{34}	—	April 20, 1998	Socorro	LINEAR	EOS ·	6.3 km	MPC · JPL
18697 Kathanson	1998 HB_{39}	Kathanson	April 20, 1998	Socorro	LINEAR	·	5.4 km	MPC · JPL
18698 Racharles	1998 HX_{39}	Racharles	April 20, 1998	Socorro	LINEAR	·	3.4 km	MPC · JPL
18699 Quigley	1998 HL_{45}	Quigley	April 20, 1998	Socorro	LINEAR	slow	6.1 km	MPC · JPL
18700	1998 HK_{54}	—	April 21, 1998	Socorro	LINEAR	EOS	6.5 km	MPC · JPL

== 18701–18800 ==
back to top

Designation			Discovery			Properties		Ref
Permanent	Provisional	Named after	Date	Site	Discoverer(s)	Category	Diam.	Ref
18701	1998 HB_{57}	—	April 21, 1998	Socorro	LINEAR	·	12 km	MPC · JPL
18702 Sadowski	1998 HG_{68}	Sadowski	April 21, 1998	Socorro	LINEAR	·	4.1 km	MPC · JPL
18703	1998 HN_{68}	—	April 21, 1998	Socorro	LINEAR	·	9.5 km	MPC · JPL
18704 Brychristian	1998 HF_{87}	Brychristian	April 21, 1998	Socorro	LINEAR	·	5.3 km	MPC · JPL
18705	1998 HX_{88}	—	April 21, 1998	Socorro	LINEAR	THM	9.7 km	MPC · JPL
18706	1998 HV_{93}	—	April 21, 1998	Socorro	LINEAR	·	8.8 km	MPC · JPL
18707 Annchi	1998 HO_{96}	Annchi	April 21, 1998	Socorro	LINEAR	(5)	3.2 km	MPC · JPL
18708 Danielappel	1998 HT_{97}	Danielappel	April 21, 1998	Socorro	LINEAR	·	5.3 km	MPC · JPL
18709 Laurawong	1998 HE_{99}	Laurawong	April 21, 1998	Socorro	LINEAR	·	7.9 km	MPC · JPL
18710	1998 HF_{100}	—	April 21, 1998	Socorro	LINEAR	LEO	9.9 km	MPC · JPL
18711	1998 HL_{100}	—	April 21, 1998	Socorro	LINEAR	EUN	4.2 km	MPC · JPL
18712	1998 HN_{108}	—	April 23, 1998	Socorro	LINEAR	DOR	12 km	MPC · JPL
18713	1998 HM_{114}	—	April 23, 1998	Socorro	LINEAR	EOS	7.3 km	MPC · JPL
18714	1998 HQ_{114}	—	April 23, 1998	Socorro	LINEAR	EOS	5.8 km	MPC · JPL
18715	1998 HE_{121}	—	April 23, 1998	Socorro	LINEAR	EOS	9.5 km	MPC · JPL
18716	1998 HV_{121}	—	April 23, 1998	Socorro	LINEAR	EOS	9.2 km	MPC · JPL
18717	1998 HZ_{127}	—	April 18, 1998	Socorro	LINEAR	THM	6.8 km	MPC · JPL
18718	1998 HJ_{128}	—	April 19, 1998	Socorro	LINEAR	MAR	5.6 km	MPC · JPL
18719	1998 HH_{138}	—	April 21, 1998	Socorro	LINEAR	EOS	7.6 km	MPC · JPL
18720 Jerryguo	1998 HP_{145}	Jerryguo	April 21, 1998	Socorro	LINEAR	LIX	14 km	MPC · JPL
18721	1998 HC_{146}	—	April 21, 1998	Socorro	LINEAR	·	11 km	MPC · JPL
18722	1998 HF_{148}	—	April 25, 1998	La Silla	E. W. Elst	·	10 km	MPC · JPL
18723	1998 JO_{1}	—	May 1, 1998	Haleakala	NEAT	THM	12 km	MPC · JPL
18724	1998 JV_{1}	—	May 1, 1998	Haleakala	NEAT	(1298)	15 km	MPC · JPL
18725 Atacama	1998 JL_{3}	Atacama	May 2, 1998	Caussols	ODAS	GEF	6.0 km	MPC · JPL
18726	1998 KC_{2}	—	May 22, 1998	Socorro	LINEAR	·	3.7 km	MPC · JPL
18727 Peacock	1998 KW_{3}	Peacock	May 22, 1998	Anderson Mesa	LONEOS	HYG	11 km	MPC · JPL
18728 Grammier	1998 KZ_{3}	Grammier	May 22, 1998	Anderson Mesa	LONEOS	·	4.8 km	MPC · JPL
18729 Potentino	1998 KJ_{4}	Potentino	May 22, 1998	Anderson Mesa	LONEOS	KOR	5.0 km	MPC · JPL
18730 Wingip	1998 KV_{7}	Wingip	May 23, 1998	Anderson Mesa	LONEOS	·	6.0 km	MPC · JPL
18731 Vilʹbakirov	1998 KW_{7}	Vilʹbakirov	May 23, 1998	Anderson Mesa	LONEOS	EOS	9.8 km	MPC · JPL
18732	1998 KP_{19}	—	May 22, 1998	Socorro	LINEAR	·	16 km	MPC · JPL
18733	1998 KV_{31}	—	May 22, 1998	Socorro	LINEAR	·	8.1 km	MPC · JPL
18734 Darboux	1998 MY_{1}	Darboux	June 20, 1998	Prescott	P. G. Comba	EUN	3.8 km	MPC · JPL
18735 Chubko	1998 MH_{46}	Chubko	June 23, 1998	Anderson Mesa	LONEOS	·	7.0 km	MPC · JPL
18736	1998 NU	—	July 2, 1998	Kitt Peak	Spacewatch	AMO +1km	2.3 km	MPC · JPL
18737 Aliciaworley	1998 QP_{79}	Aliciaworley	August 24, 1998	Socorro	LINEAR	·	4.8 km	MPC · JPL
18738	1998 SN_{22}	—	September 23, 1998	Višnjan Observatory	Višnjan	EUN	4.5 km	MPC · JPL
18739 Larryhu	1998 SH_{79}	Larryhu	September 26, 1998	Socorro	LINEAR	·	2.7 km	MPC · JPL
18740	1998 VH_{31}	—	November 14, 1998	Oizumi	T. Kobayashi	·	3.0 km	MPC · JPL
18741	1998 WB_{6}	—	November 18, 1998	Kushiro	S. Ueda, H. Kaneda	·	4.4 km	MPC · JPL
18742	1998 XX_{30}	—	December 14, 1998	Socorro	LINEAR	·	5.8 km	MPC · JPL
18743	1998 YD_{5}	—	December 18, 1998	Caussols	ODAS	·	17 km	MPC · JPL
18744	1999 AU	—	January 7, 1999	Oizumi	T. Kobayashi	PHO	8.1 km	MPC · JPL
18745 San Pedro	1999 BJ_{14}	San Pedro	January 23, 1999	Caussols	ODAS	MAR	5.4 km	MPC · JPL
18746	1999 FT_{20}	—	March 19, 1999	Kitt Peak	Spacewatch	·	2.9 km	MPC · JPL
18747 Lexcen	1999 FN_{21}	Lexcen	March 26, 1999	Reedy Creek	J. Broughton	·	3.4 km	MPC · JPL
18748	1999 GV	—	April 5, 1999	Višnjan Observatory	K. Korlević	·	4.2 km	MPC · JPL
18749 Ayyubguliev	1999 GA_{8}	Ayyubguliev	April 9, 1999	Anderson Mesa	LONEOS	·	1.9 km	MPC · JPL
18750 Leonidakimov	1999 GA_{9}	Leonidakimov	April 10, 1999	Anderson Mesa	LONEOS	·	3.8 km	MPC · JPL
18751 Yualexandrov	1999 GO_{9}	Yualexandrov	April 15, 1999	Anderson Mesa	LONEOS	·	3.0 km	MPC · JPL
18752	1999 GZ_{16}	—	April 15, 1999	Socorro	LINEAR	·	2.5 km	MPC · JPL
18753	1999 GE_{17}	—	April 15, 1999	Socorro	LINEAR	CLO ·	9.6 km	MPC · JPL
18754	1999 GL_{21}	—	April 15, 1999	Socorro	LINEAR	V	4.4 km	MPC · JPL
18755 Meduna	1999 GS_{21}	Meduna	April 15, 1999	Socorro	LINEAR	·	2.2 km	MPC · JPL
18756	1999 GY_{34}	—	April 6, 1999	Socorro	LINEAR	·	2.5 km	MPC · JPL
18757	1999 HT	—	April 18, 1999	Woomera	F. B. Zoltowski	NYS	3.0 km	MPC · JPL
18758	1999 HD_{2}	—	April 19, 1999	Višnjan Observatory	K. Korlević, M. Jurić	·	2.9 km	MPC · JPL
18759	1999 HO_{2}	—	April 20, 1999	Valinhos	P. R. Holvorcem	·	2.9 km	MPC · JPL
18760	1999 HY_{7}	—	April 19, 1999	Kitt Peak	Spacewatch	MAS	3.1 km	MPC · JPL
18761	1999 HA_{8}	—	April 20, 1999	Kitt Peak	Spacewatch	·	6.5 km	MPC · JPL
18762	1999 HC_{9}	—	April 17, 1999	Socorro	LINEAR	·	2.0 km	MPC · JPL
18763	1999 JV_{2}	—	May 8, 1999	Xinglong	SCAP	EUN	3.7 km	MPC · JPL
18764	1999 JA_{12}	—	May 13, 1999	Socorro	LINEAR	PHO	4.0 km	MPC · JPL
18765	1999 JN_{17}	—	May 14, 1999	Socorro	LINEAR	·	3.5 km	MPC · JPL
18766 Broderick	1999 JA_{22}	Broderick	May 10, 1999	Socorro	LINEAR	·	3.5 km	MPC · JPL
18767	1999 JD_{22}	—	May 10, 1999	Socorro	LINEAR	·	3.2 km	MPC · JPL
18768 Sarahbates	1999 JE_{22}	Sarahbates	May 10, 1999	Socorro	LINEAR	·	2.2 km	MPC · JPL
18769	1999 JS_{24}	—	May 10, 1999	Socorro	LINEAR	·	10 km	MPC · JPL
18770 Yingqiuqilei	1999 JN_{25}	Yingqiuqilei	May 10, 1999	Socorro	LINEAR	·	3.3 km	MPC · JPL
18771 Sisiliang	1999 JA_{26}	Sisiliang	May 10, 1999	Socorro	LINEAR	NYS ·	5.7 km	MPC · JPL
18772	1999 JR_{34}	—	May 10, 1999	Socorro	LINEAR	·	3.2 km	MPC · JPL
18773 Bredehoft	1999 JY_{36}	Bredehoft	May 10, 1999	Socorro	LINEAR	·	3.7 km	MPC · JPL
18774 Lavanture	1999 JT_{38}	Lavanture	May 10, 1999	Socorro	LINEAR	NYS ·	7.7 km	MPC · JPL
18775 Donaldeng	1999 JD_{39}	Donaldeng	May 10, 1999	Socorro	LINEAR	·	4.2 km	MPC · JPL
18776 Coulter	1999 JP_{39}	Coulter	May 10, 1999	Socorro	LINEAR	·	3.3 km	MPC · JPL
18777 Hobson	1999 JA_{41}	Hobson	May 10, 1999	Socorro	LINEAR	·	3.5 km	MPC · JPL
18778	1999 JW_{43}	—	May 10, 1999	Socorro	LINEAR	EOS · slow	12 km	MPC · JPL
18779 Hattyhong	1999 JN_{44}	Hattyhong	May 10, 1999	Socorro	LINEAR	V	3.5 km	MPC · JPL
18780 Kuncham	1999 JY_{44}	Kuncham	May 10, 1999	Socorro	LINEAR	·	2.9 km	MPC · JPL
18781 Indaram	1999 JH_{45}	Indaram	May 10, 1999	Socorro	LINEAR	NYS	3.3 km	MPC · JPL
18782 Joanrho	1999 JJ_{46}	Joanrho	May 10, 1999	Socorro	LINEAR	·	2.1 km	MPC · JPL
18783 Sychamberlin	1999 JL_{47}	Sychamberlin	May 10, 1999	Socorro	LINEAR	·	3.4 km	MPC · JPL
18784	1999 JS_{47}	—	May 10, 1999	Socorro	LINEAR	NYS	3.3 km	MPC · JPL
18785 Betsywelsh	1999 JV_{48}	Betsywelsh	May 10, 1999	Socorro	LINEAR	·	4.4 km	MPC · JPL
18786 Tyjorgenson	1999 JS_{53}	Tyjorgenson	May 10, 1999	Socorro	LINEAR	·	3.7 km	MPC · JPL
18787 Kathermann	1999 JV_{53}	Kathermann	May 10, 1999	Socorro	LINEAR	·	2.8 km	MPC · JPL
18788 Carriemiller	1999 JX_{53}	Carriemiller	May 10, 1999	Socorro	LINEAR	·	2.7 km	MPC · JPL
18789 Metzger	1999 JV_{56}	Metzger	May 10, 1999	Socorro	LINEAR	·	2.5 km	MPC · JPL
18790 Ericaburden	1999 JG_{57}	Ericaburden	May 10, 1999	Socorro	LINEAR	·	3.6 km	MPC · JPL
18791	1999 JF_{58}	—	May 10, 1999	Socorro	LINEAR	·	4.0 km	MPC · JPL
18792	1999 JL_{60}	—	May 10, 1999	Socorro	LINEAR	EUN	5.4 km	MPC · JPL
18793	1999 JW_{60}	—	May 10, 1999	Socorro	LINEAR	·	7.3 km	MPC · JPL
18794 Kianafrank	1999 JG_{62}	Kianafrank	May 10, 1999	Socorro	LINEAR	·	4.3 km	MPC · JPL
18795	1999 JT_{63}	—	May 10, 1999	Socorro	LINEAR	·	3.7 km	MPC · JPL
18796 Acosta	1999 JH_{64}	Acosta	May 10, 1999	Socorro	LINEAR	·	3.8 km	MPC · JPL
18797	1999 JT_{64}	—	May 10, 1999	Socorro	LINEAR	·	4.0 km	MPC · JPL
18798	1999 JG_{65}	—	May 12, 1999	Socorro	LINEAR	·	5.0 km	MPC · JPL
18799	1999 JZ_{73}	—	May 12, 1999	Socorro	LINEAR	CLO · slow	8.2 km	MPC · JPL
18800 Terresadodge	1999 JL_{76}	Terresadodge	May 10, 1999	Socorro	LINEAR	·	4.4 km	MPC · JPL

== 18801–18900 ==
back to top

Designation			Discovery			Properties		Ref
Permanent	Provisional	Named after	Date	Site	Discoverer(s)	Category	Diam.	Ref
18801 Noelleoas	1999 JO_{76}	Noelleoas	May 10, 1999	Socorro	LINEAR	·	3.6 km	MPC · JPL
18802	1999 JR_{76}	—	May 10, 1999	Socorro	LINEAR	EUN	3.9 km	MPC · JPL
18803 Hillaryoas	1999 JH_{77}	Hillaryoas	May 12, 1999	Socorro	LINEAR	·	3.9 km	MPC · JPL
18804	1999 JS_{77}	—	May 12, 1999	Socorro	LINEAR	·	5.6 km	MPC · JPL
18805 Kellyday	1999 JX_{77}	Kellyday	May 12, 1999	Socorro	LINEAR	·	4.0 km	MPC · JPL
18806 Zachpenn	1999 JX_{79}	Zachpenn	May 13, 1999	Socorro	LINEAR	MRX	3.5 km	MPC · JPL
18807	1999 JL_{85}	—	May 14, 1999	Socorro	LINEAR	PHO	7.8 km	MPC · JPL
18808	1999 JP_{85}	—	May 15, 1999	Socorro	LINEAR	·	4.3 km	MPC · JPL
18809 Meileawertz	1999 JP_{86}	Meileawertz	May 12, 1999	Socorro	LINEAR	·	1.9 km	MPC · JPL
18810	1999 JF_{96}	—	May 12, 1999	Socorro	LINEAR	EUN	5.1 km	MPC · JPL
18811	1999 KJ_{1}	—	May 18, 1999	Višnjan Observatory	K. Korlević	·	9.1 km	MPC · JPL
18812 Aliadler	1999 KT_{13}	Aliadler	May 18, 1999	Socorro	LINEAR	V	4.5 km	MPC · JPL
18813	1999 KH_{15}	—	May 20, 1999	Socorro	LINEAR	EUN	7.6 km	MPC · JPL
18814 Ivanovsky	1999 KJ_{17}	Ivanovsky	May 20, 1999	Anderson Mesa	LONEOS	·	3.5 km	MPC · JPL
18815	1999 LT_{8}	—	June 8, 1999	Socorro	LINEAR	·	12 km	MPC · JPL
18816	1999 LW_{25}	—	June 9, 1999	Socorro	LINEAR	·	5.3 km	MPC · JPL
18817	1999 LF_{32}	—	June 15, 1999	Kitt Peak	Spacewatch	NYS	3.8 km	MPC · JPL
18818 Yasuhiko	1999 MB_{2}	Yasuhiko	June 21, 1999	Nanyo	T. Okuni	·	4.9 km	MPC · JPL
18819	1999 NK_{8}	—	July 13, 1999	Socorro	LINEAR	·	4.6 km	MPC · JPL
18820	1999 NS_{9}	—	July 13, 1999	Socorro	LINEAR	GEF	6.7 km	MPC · JPL
18821 Markhavel	1999 NW_{9}	Markhavel	July 13, 1999	Socorro	LINEAR	KOR	5.5 km	MPC · JPL
18822	1999 NL_{19}	—	July 14, 1999	Socorro	LINEAR	EOS	5.4 km	MPC · JPL
18823 Zachozer	1999 NS_{20}	Zachozer	July 14, 1999	Socorro	LINEAR	NYS	5.6 km	MPC · JPL
18824 Graves	1999 NF_{23}	Graves	July 14, 1999	Socorro	LINEAR	NYS	2.5 km	MPC · JPL
18825 Alicechai	1999 NO_{23}	Alicechai	July 14, 1999	Socorro	LINEAR	·	4.9 km	MPC · JPL
18826 Leifer	1999 NG_{24}	Leifer	July 14, 1999	Socorro	LINEAR	·	4.9 km	MPC · JPL
18827	1999 NA_{26}	—	July 14, 1999	Socorro	LINEAR	·	21 km	MPC · JPL
18828	1999 NT_{27}	—	July 14, 1999	Socorro	LINEAR	THM	13 km	MPC · JPL
18829	1999 NE_{30}	—	July 14, 1999	Socorro	LINEAR	GEF	5.7 km	MPC · JPL
18830 Pothier	1999 NZ_{35}	Pothier	July 14, 1999	Socorro	LINEAR	·	3.5 km	MPC · JPL
18831	1999 NP_{37}	—	July 14, 1999	Socorro	LINEAR	EOS	8.7 km	MPC · JPL
18832	1999 NV_{42}	—	July 14, 1999	Socorro	LINEAR	·	5.0 km	MPC · JPL
18833	1999 NT_{53}	—	July 12, 1999	Socorro	LINEAR	ADE	11 km	MPC · JPL
18834	1999 NN_{55}	—	July 12, 1999	Socorro	LINEAR	·	4.2 km	MPC · JPL
18835	1999 NK_{56}	—	July 12, 1999	Socorro	LINEAR	EUN	8.5 km	MPC · JPL
18836 Raymundto	1999 NM_{62}	Raymundto	July 13, 1999	Socorro	LINEAR	·	2.8 km	MPC · JPL
18837	1999 NY_{62}	—	July 13, 1999	Socorro	LINEAR	PHO	4.4 km	MPC · JPL
18838 Shannon	1999 OQ	Shannon	July 18, 1999	Ondřejov	L. Kotková, P. Kušnirák	KOR	4.4 km	MPC · JPL
18839 Whiteley	1999 PG	Whiteley	August 5, 1999	Reedy Creek	J. Broughton	EOS ·	7.5 km	MPC · JPL
18840 Yoshioba	1999 PT_{4}	Yoshioba	August 8, 1999	Nanyo	T. Okuni	·	5.3 km	MPC · JPL
18841 Hruška	1999 RL_{3}	Hruška	September 6, 1999	Kleť	J. Tichá, M. Tichý	MAR	7.3 km	MPC · JPL
18842	1999 RB_{22}	—	September 7, 1999	Socorro	LINEAR	·	8.4 km	MPC · JPL
18843 Ningzhou	1999 RK_{22}	Ningzhou	September 7, 1999	Socorro	LINEAR	·	5.4 km	MPC · JPL
18844	1999 RU_{27}	—	September 8, 1999	Višnjan Observatory	K. Korlević	·	12 km	MPC · JPL
18845 Cichocki	1999 RY_{27}	Cichocki	September 7, 1999	Črni Vrh	Mikuž, H.	EUN	6.7 km	MPC · JPL
18846	1999 RB_{28}	—	September 8, 1999	Kleť	Kleť	·	5.6 km	MPC · JPL
18847	1999 RJ_{32}	—	September 9, 1999	Višnjan Observatory	K. Korlević	·	14 km	MPC · JPL
18848	1999 RH_{41}	—	September 13, 1999	Socorro	LINEAR	·	17 km	MPC · JPL
18849	1999 RK_{55}	—	September 7, 1999	Socorro	LINEAR	·	9.6 km	MPC · JPL
18850	1999 RO_{81}	—	September 7, 1999	Socorro	LINEAR	·	10 km	MPC · JPL
18851 Winmesser	1999 RP_{84}	Winmesser	September 7, 1999	Socorro	LINEAR	·	7.6 km	MPC · JPL
18852	1999 RP_{91}	—	September 7, 1999	Socorro	LINEAR	THM	12 km	MPC · JPL
18853	1999 RO_{92}	—	September 7, 1999	Socorro	LINEAR	ANF	5.3 km	MPC · JPL
18854	1999 RJ_{102}	—	September 8, 1999	Socorro	LINEAR	·	4.9 km	MPC · JPL
18855 Sarahgutman	1999 RQ_{112}	Sarahgutman	September 9, 1999	Socorro	LINEAR	·	3.5 km	MPC · JPL
18856	1999 RT_{116}	—	September 9, 1999	Socorro	LINEAR	·	5.2 km	MPC · JPL
18857 Lalchandani	1999 RE_{117}	Lalchandani	September 9, 1999	Socorro	LINEAR	V · slow	3.0 km	MPC · JPL
18858 Tecleveland	1999 RO_{117}	Tecleveland	September 9, 1999	Socorro	LINEAR	·	5.6 km	MPC · JPL
18859	1999 RM_{130}	—	September 9, 1999	Socorro	LINEAR	·	8.3 km	MPC · JPL
18860	1999 RL_{133}	—	September 9, 1999	Socorro	LINEAR	·	20 km	MPC · JPL
18861 Eugenishmidt	1999 RW_{166}	Eugenishmidt	September 9, 1999	Socorro	LINEAR	·	3.7 km	MPC · JPL
18862 Warot	1999 RE_{183}	Warot	September 9, 1999	Socorro	LINEAR	·	3.0 km	MPC · JPL
18863	1999 RC_{191}	—	September 11, 1999	Socorro	LINEAR	EUN	7.6 km	MPC · JPL
18864	1999 RQ_{195}	—	September 8, 1999	Socorro	LINEAR	URS	7.1 km	MPC · JPL
18865	1999 RQ_{204}	—	September 8, 1999	Socorro	LINEAR	EOS	9.4 km	MPC · JPL
18866	1999 RA_{208}	—	September 8, 1999	Socorro	LINEAR	·	4.5 km	MPC · JPL
18867	1999 RX_{223}	—	September 7, 1999	Catalina	CSS	·	5.5 km	MPC · JPL
18868	1999 TD_{101}	—	October 2, 1999	Socorro	LINEAR	·	8.9 km	MPC · JPL
18869	1999 TU_{222}	—	October 2, 1999	Socorro	LINEAR	·	7.2 km	MPC · JPL
18870	1999 US_{13}	—	October 29, 1999	Catalina	CSS	·	4.5 km	MPC · JPL
18871 Grauer	1999 VQ_{12}	Grauer	November 11, 1999	Fountain Hills	C. W. Juels	EUN	7.9 km	MPC · JPL
18872 Tammann	1999 VR_{20}	Tammann	November 8, 1999	Gnosca	S. Sposetti	MAR	5.5 km	MPC · JPL
18873 Larryrobinson	1999 VJ_{22}	Larryrobinson	November 13, 1999	EverStaR	Abraham, M., Fedon, G.	·	3.5 km	MPC · JPL
18874 Raoulbehrend	1999 VZ_{22}	Raoulbehrend	November 8, 1999	Gnosca	S. Sposetti	·	2.6 km	MPC · JPL
18875	1999 VT_{39}	—	November 11, 1999	Kitt Peak	Spacewatch	THM	8.9 km	MPC · JPL
18876 Sooner	1999 XM	Sooner	December 2, 1999	Oaxaca	Roe, J. M.	·	3.1 km	MPC · JPL
18877 Stevendodds	1999 XP_{7}	Stevendodds	December 4, 1999	Fountain Hills	C. W. Juels	·	5.0 km	MPC · JPL
18878	1999 XD_{118}	—	December 5, 1999	Catalina	CSS	·	3.8 km	MPC · JPL
18879	1999 XJ_{143}	—	December 15, 1999	Fountain Hills	C. W. Juels	EUN	5.6 km	MPC · JPL
18880 Toddblumberg	1999 XM_{166}	Toddblumberg	December 10, 1999	Socorro	LINEAR	·	4.3 km	MPC · JPL
18881	1999 XL_{195}	—	December 12, 1999	Socorro	LINEAR	MAR	9.0 km	MPC · JPL
18882	1999 YN_{4}	—	December 28, 1999	Socorro	LINEAR	AMO +1km	2.1 km	MPC · JPL
18883 Domegge	1999 YT_{8}	Domegge	December 31, 1999	EverStaR	Abraham, M., Fedon, G.	EOS	4.4 km	MPC · JPL
18884	1999 YE_{9}	—	December 30, 1999	Višnjan Observatory	K. Korlević	·	5.9 km	MPC · JPL
18885	2000 AH_{80}	—	January 5, 2000	Socorro	LINEAR	·	2.6 km	MPC · JPL
18886	2000 AN_{164}	—	January 5, 2000	Socorro	LINEAR	·	5.7 km	MPC · JPL
18887 Yiliuchen	2000 AP_{181}	Yiliuchen	January 7, 2000	Socorro	LINEAR	·	3.5 km	MPC · JPL
18888	2000 AV_{246}	—	January 7, 2000	Kitt Peak	Spacewatch	2:1J	10 km	MPC · JPL
18889	2000 CC_{28}	—	February 8, 2000	Socorro	LINEAR	ADE	13 km	MPC · JPL
18890	2000 EV_{26}	—	March 9, 2000	Socorro	LINEAR	H · moon	2.1 km	MPC · JPL
18891 Kamler	2000 EF_{40}	Kamler	March 8, 2000	Socorro	LINEAR	·	4.6 km	MPC · JPL
18892	2000 ET_{137}	—	March 9, 2000	Socorro	LINEAR	ADE · slow	8.2 km	MPC · JPL
18893	2000 GH_{1}	—	April 2, 2000	Starkenburg Observatory	Starkenburg	URS	9.0 km	MPC · JPL
18894	2000 GF_{42}	—	April 5, 2000	Socorro	LINEAR	HYG	7.7 km	MPC · JPL
18895	2000 GJ_{108}	—	April 7, 2000	Socorro	LINEAR	·	22 km	MPC · JPL
18896	2000 GN_{113}	—	April 6, 2000	Socorro	LINEAR	·	6.4 km	MPC · JPL
18897	2000 HG_{30}	—	April 28, 2000	Socorro	LINEAR	EUN	9.2 km	MPC · JPL
18898	2000 JX	—	May 1, 2000	Socorro	LINEAR	T_{j} (2.97)	14 km	MPC · JPL
18899	2000 JQ_{2}	—	May 3, 2000	Višnjan Observatory	K. Korlević	slow	2.1 km	MPC · JPL
18900	2000 LD_{12}	—	June 4, 2000	Socorro	LINEAR	TIR	7.8 km	MPC · JPL

== 18901–19000 ==
back to top

Designation			Discovery			Properties		Ref
Permanent	Provisional	Named after	Date	Site	Discoverer(s)	Category	Diam.	Ref
18901	2000 MR_{5}	—	June 24, 2000	Socorro	LINEAR	·	13 km	MPC · JPL
18902	2000 NN_{5}	—	July 7, 2000	Socorro	LINEAR	GEF	5.5 km	MPC · JPL
18903 Matsuura	2000 ND_{29}	Matsuura	July 10, 2000	JCPM Sapporo	K. Watanabe	·	5.7 km	MPC · JPL
18904	2000 OY_{8}	—	July 31, 2000	Socorro	LINEAR	NYS	3.1 km	MPC · JPL
18905 Weigan	2000 OF_{10}	Weigan	July 23, 2000	Socorro	LINEAR	·	2.4 km	MPC · JPL
18906	2000 OJ_{19}	—	July 29, 2000	Socorro	LINEAR	·	5.0 km	MPC · JPL
18907 Kevinclaytor	2000 OW_{20}	Kevinclaytor	July 31, 2000	Socorro	LINEAR	V	3.0 km	MPC · JPL
18908	2000 OC_{21}	—	July 31, 2000	Socorro	LINEAR	NYS ·	5.8 km	MPC · JPL
18909	2000 OE_{21}	—	July 31, 2000	Socorro	LINEAR	·	10 km	MPC · JPL
18910 Nolanreis	2000 OR_{22}	Nolanreis	July 31, 2000	Socorro	LINEAR	·	3.4 km	MPC · JPL
18911	2000 OY_{31}	—	July 30, 2000	Socorro	LINEAR	·	12 km	MPC · JPL
18912 Kayfurman	2000 OM_{32}	Kayfurman	July 30, 2000	Socorro	LINEAR	GEF	4.2 km	MPC · JPL
18913	2000 OU_{32}	—	July 30, 2000	Socorro	LINEAR	·	5.1 km	MPC · JPL
18914	2000 OT_{35}	—	July 31, 2000	Socorro	LINEAR	·	3.9 km	MPC · JPL
18915	2000 OR_{38}	—	July 30, 2000	Socorro	LINEAR	·	7.9 km	MPC · JPL
18916	2000 OG_{44}	—	July 30, 2000	Socorro	LINEAR	T_{j} (2.74)	5.6 km	MPC · JPL
18917	2000 OG_{48}	—	July 31, 2000	Socorro	LINEAR	·	6.1 km	MPC · JPL
18918 Nishashah	2000 OB_{50}	Nishashah	July 31, 2000	Socorro	LINEAR	(2076)	3.9 km	MPC · JPL
18919	2000 OJ_{52}	—	July 31, 2000	Socorro	LINEAR	·	3.1 km	MPC · JPL
18920	2000 OU_{52}	—	July 31, 2000	Socorro	LINEAR	·	3.7 km	MPC · JPL
18921	2000 PT_{7}	—	August 2, 2000	Socorro	LINEAR	EOS	8.6 km	MPC · JPL
18922	2000 PU_{12}	—	August 8, 2000	Socorro	LINEAR	EUN	7.3 km	MPC · JPL
18923 Jennifersass	2000 PC_{23}	Jennifersass	August 2, 2000	Socorro	LINEAR	·	2.6 km	MPC · JPL
18924 Vinjamoori	2000 PV_{24}	Vinjamoori	August 3, 2000	Socorro	LINEAR	V	2.5 km	MPC · JPL
18925	2000 PY_{25}	—	August 4, 2000	Haleakala	NEAT	·	9.3 km	MPC · JPL
18926	2000 PO_{26}	—	August 5, 2000	Haleakala	NEAT	·	2.1 km	MPC · JPL
18927	2000 PQ_{26}	—	August 5, 2000	Haleakala	NEAT	·	10 km	MPC · JPL
18928 Pontremoli	2000 QH_{9}	Pontremoli	August 25, 2000	Monte Viseggi	Viseggi, Monte	EOS	6.4 km	MPC · JPL
18929	2000 QU_{25}	—	August 26, 2000	Socorro	LINEAR	H	1.5 km	MPC · JPL
18930 Athreya	2000 QW_{27}	Athreya	August 24, 2000	Socorro	LINEAR	KOR	3.9 km	MPC · JPL
18931	2000 QX_{31}	—	August 26, 2000	Socorro	LINEAR	·	7.7 km	MPC · JPL
18932 Robinhood	2000 QH_{35}	Robinhood	August 28, 2000	Reedy Creek	J. Broughton	NYS	3.8 km	MPC · JPL
18933	2000 QW_{36}	—	August 24, 2000	Socorro	LINEAR	·	3.4 km	MPC · JPL
18934	2000 QY_{36}	—	August 24, 2000	Socorro	LINEAR	·	9.2 km	MPC · JPL
18935 Alfandmedina	2000 QE_{37}	Alfandmedina	August 24, 2000	Socorro	LINEAR	·	2.2 km	MPC · JPL
18936	2000 QA_{42}	—	August 24, 2000	Socorro	LINEAR	EOS	8.5 km	MPC · JPL
18937	2000 QF_{42}	—	August 24, 2000	Socorro	LINEAR	EOS	5.9 km	MPC · JPL
18938 Zarabeth	2000 QU_{44}	Zarabeth	August 24, 2000	Socorro	LINEAR	·	5.1 km	MPC · JPL
18939 Sariancel	2000 QZ_{48}	Sariancel	August 24, 2000	Socorro	LINEAR	THM	11 km	MPC · JPL
18940	2000 QV_{49}	—	August 24, 2000	Socorro	LINEAR	L5	21 km	MPC · JPL
18941	2000 QX_{50}	—	August 24, 2000	Socorro	LINEAR	HYG	9.8 km	MPC · JPL
18942	2000 QE_{54}	—	August 25, 2000	Socorro	LINEAR	·	9.5 km	MPC · JPL
18943 Elaisponton	2000 QA_{55}	Elaisponton	August 25, 2000	Socorro	LINEAR	V	2.2 km	MPC · JPL
18944 Sawilliams	2000 QG_{61}	Sawilliams	August 28, 2000	Socorro	LINEAR	·	7.7 km	MPC · JPL
18945	2000 QH_{71}	—	August 24, 2000	Socorro	LINEAR	·	4.3 km	MPC · JPL
18946 Massar	2000 QM_{75}	Massar	August 24, 2000	Socorro	LINEAR	·	8.7 km	MPC · JPL
18947 Cindyfulton	2000 QV_{76}	Cindyfulton	August 24, 2000	Socorro	LINEAR	NYS	3.4 km	MPC · JPL
18948 Hinkle	2000 QT_{79}	Hinkle	August 24, 2000	Socorro	LINEAR	(7744)	6.1 km	MPC · JPL
18949 Tumaneng	2000 QX_{85}	Tumaneng	August 25, 2000	Socorro	LINEAR	·	1.9 km	MPC · JPL
18950 Marakessler	2000 QX_{95}	Marakessler	August 26, 2000	Socorro	LINEAR	PAD	4.5 km	MPC · JPL
18951	2000 QQ_{98}	—	August 28, 2000	Socorro	LINEAR	·	3.3 km	MPC · JPL
18952	2000 QF_{105}	—	August 28, 2000	Socorro	LINEAR	·	13 km	MPC · JPL
18953 Laurensmith	2000 QR_{114}	Laurensmith	August 24, 2000	Socorro	LINEAR	(12739)	3.8 km	MPC · JPL
18954 Sarahbounds	2000 QT_{119}	Sarahbounds	August 25, 2000	Socorro	LINEAR	·	2.8 km	MPC · JPL
18955	2000 QY_{122}	—	August 25, 2000	Socorro	LINEAR	·	11 km	MPC · JPL
18956 Jessicarnold	2000 QK_{126}	Jessicarnold	August 31, 2000	Socorro	LINEAR	·	2.2 km	MPC · JPL
18957 Mijacobsen	2000 QE_{128}	Mijacobsen	August 24, 2000	Socorro	LINEAR	·	2.5 km	MPC · JPL
18958	2000 QL_{128}	—	August 24, 2000	Socorro	LINEAR	CYB	15 km	MPC · JPL
18959	2000 QG_{129}	—	August 31, 2000	Socorro	LINEAR	SYL · CYB	10 km	MPC · JPL
18960	2000 QE_{130}	—	August 31, 2000	Socorro	LINEAR	·	4.6 km	MPC · JPL
18961 Hampfreeman	2000 QR_{140}	Hampfreeman	August 31, 2000	Socorro	LINEAR	NYS	3.7 km	MPC · JPL
18962	2000 QV_{140}	—	August 31, 2000	Socorro	LINEAR	·	3.7 km	MPC · JPL
18963	2000 QB_{141}	—	August 31, 2000	Socorro	LINEAR	DOR	16 km	MPC · JPL
18964 Fairhurst	2000 QJ_{142}	Fairhurst	August 31, 2000	Socorro	LINEAR	NYS	3.2 km	MPC · JPL
18965 Lazenby	2000 QR_{142}	Lazenby	August 31, 2000	Socorro	LINEAR	·	2.1 km	MPC · JPL
18966	2000 QO_{145}	—	August 31, 2000	Socorro	LINEAR	·	1.5 km	MPC · JPL
18967	2000 QP_{151}	—	August 25, 2000	Socorro	LINEAR	GEF	5.8 km	MPC · JPL
18968	2000 QX_{152}	—	August 29, 2000	Socorro	LINEAR	·	5.7 km	MPC · JPL
18969 Valfriedmann	2000 QY_{152}	Valfriedmann	August 29, 2000	Socorro	LINEAR	·	2.4 km	MPC · JPL
18970 Jenniharper	2000 QU_{168}	Jenniharper	August 31, 2000	Socorro	LINEAR	·	3.6 km	MPC · JPL
18971	2000 QY_{177}	—	August 31, 2000	Socorro	LINEAR	L5	25 km	MPC · JPL
18972	2000 QD_{190}	—	August 26, 2000	Socorro	LINEAR	·	9.3 km	MPC · JPL
18973 Crouch	2000 QJ_{193}	Crouch	August 29, 2000	Socorro	LINEAR	·	5.6 km	MPC · JPL
18974 Brungardt	2000 QX_{195}	Brungardt	August 28, 2000	Socorro	LINEAR	·	3.6 km	MPC · JPL
18975	2000 QZ_{200}	—	August 29, 2000	Socorro	LINEAR	·	5.5 km	MPC · JPL
18976 Kunilraval	2000 QH_{206}	Kunilraval	August 31, 2000	Socorro	LINEAR	·	3.1 km	MPC · JPL
18977	2000 QK_{217}	—	August 31, 2000	Socorro	LINEAR	EUN	6.9 km	MPC · JPL
18978	2000 QH_{232}	—	August 31, 2000	Socorro	LINEAR	·	3.9 km	MPC · JPL
18979 Henryfong	2000 RC_{2}	Henryfong	September 1, 2000	Socorro	LINEAR	·	4.9 km	MPC · JPL
18980 Johannatang	2000 RY_{2}	Johannatang	September 1, 2000	Socorro	LINEAR	·	6.2 km	MPC · JPL
18981	2000 RT_{3}	—	September 1, 2000	Socorro	LINEAR	·	4.4 km	MPC · JPL
18982	2000 RH_{5}	—	September 1, 2000	Socorro	LINEAR	NYS	2.9 km	MPC · JPL
18983 Allentran	2000 RG_{6}	Allentran	September 1, 2000	Socorro	LINEAR	NYS ·	7.1 km	MPC · JPL
18984 Olathe	2000 RA_{8}	Olathe	September 2, 2000	Olathe	Robinson, L.	(1118)	18 km	MPC · JPL
18985	2000 RR_{21}	—	September 1, 2000	Socorro	LINEAR	·	2.6 km	MPC · JPL
18986	2000 RF_{22}	—	September 1, 2000	Socorro	LINEAR	·	11 km	MPC · JPL
18987 Irani	2000 RU_{23}	Irani	September 1, 2000	Socorro	LINEAR	·	3.6 km	MPC · JPL
18988	2000 RB_{24}	—	September 1, 2000	Socorro	LINEAR	EUN	4.9 km	MPC · JPL
18989	2000 RV_{26}	—	September 1, 2000	Socorro	LINEAR	·	6.7 km	MPC · JPL
18990	2000 RW_{31}	—	September 1, 2000	Socorro	LINEAR	EOS ·	8.0 km	MPC · JPL
18991 Tonivanov	2000 RD_{35}	Tonivanov	September 1, 2000	Socorro	LINEAR	·	2.6 km	MPC · JPL
18992 Katharvard	2000 RK_{40}	Katharvard	September 3, 2000	Socorro	LINEAR	EOS	7.3 km	MPC · JPL
18993	2000 RB_{43}	—	September 3, 2000	Socorro	LINEAR	TEL	7.4 km	MPC · JPL
18994 Nhannguyen	2000 RO_{50}	Nhannguyen	September 5, 2000	Socorro	LINEAR	V	3.0 km	MPC · JPL
18995	2000 RF_{53}	—	September 5, 2000	Višnjan Observatory	K. Korlević	MAS	2.4 km	MPC · JPL
18996 Torasan	2000 RR_{53}	Torasan	September 4, 2000	JCPM Sapporo	K. Watanabe	·	23 km	MPC · JPL
18997 Mizrahi	2000 RG_{54}	Mizrahi	September 1, 2000	Socorro	LINEAR	·	7.1 km	MPC · JPL
18998	2000 RH_{55}	—	September 3, 2000	Socorro	LINEAR	·	7.1 km	MPC · JPL
18999	2000 RC_{60}	—	September 8, 2000	Višnjan Observatory	K. Korlević	·	5.9 km	MPC · JPL
19000	2000 RM_{60}	—	September 3, 2000	Socorro	LINEAR	GEF	5.6 km	MPC · JPL

back to top

== See also ==
- Meanings of minor-planet names: 18001–19000
