= 18880 Toddblumberg =

Asteroid

Discovery
- Discovered by: LINEAR
- Discovery site: Lincoln Lab's ETS
- Discovery date: 10 December 1999

Designations
- Named after: Todd James Blumberg (2003 ISEF awardee)
- Alternative designations: 1999 XM_{166} · 1976 UC_{20}
- Minor planet category: main-belt (outer) background

Orbital characteristics
- Epoch 4 September 2017 (JD 2458000.5)
- Uncertainty parameter 0
- Observation arc: 63.35 yr (23,140 days)
- Aphelion: 3.7961 AU
- Perihelion: 2.6135 AU
- Semi-major axis: 3.2048 AU
- Eccentricity: 0.1845
- Orbital period (sidereal): 5.74 yr (2,096 days)
- Mean anomaly: 45.170°
- Mean motion: 0° 10^{m} 18.48^{s} / day
- Inclination: 9.6539°
- Longitude of ascending node: 19.849°
- Argument of perihelion: 29.542°

Physical characteristics
- Dimensions: 4.283±0.438 km
- Geometric albedo: 0.265±0.082
- Absolute magnitude (H): 14.1

18880 Toddblumberg (provisional designation 1999 XM_{166}) is a background asteroid from the outer region of the asteroid belt, approximately 4 kilometers in diameter. It was discovered on 10 December 1999, by LINEAR at the Lincoln Laboratory's Experimental Test Site, near Socorro, New Mexico, United States. The asteroid was named after Todd Blumberg, a 2003 ISEF contest awardee.

== Orbit and classification ==
Toddblumberg orbits the Sun in the outer main-belt at a distance of 2.6–3.8 AU once every 5 years and 9 months (2,096 days). Its orbit has an eccentricity of 0.18 and an inclination of 10° with respect to the ecliptic. The first precovery was taken at Palomar Observatory (DSS) in 1953, extending the body's observation arc by 46 years prior to its official discovery observation at Socorro.

Although discovered by LINEAR, Toddblumberg is not a near-Earth asteroid. Its closest approach to the Sun (perihelion) is about double the maximum distance of 1.3 AU that qualifies an asteroid as "near-Earth".

== Physical characteristics ==
=== Diameter and albedo ===
According to the survey carried out by NASA's Wide-field Infrared Survey Explorer with its subsequent NEOWISE mission, Toddblumberg measures 4.3 kilometers in diameter and its surface has an albedo of 0.265.

=== Lightcurve ===
As of 2017, Toddblumberg's spectral type and rotation period remain unknown.

== Naming ==
This minor planet was named for Todd James Blumberg (born 1984), a student at the Plano Senior High School in Plano, Texas, who won the Intel International Science and Engineering Fair (ISEF) award for his microbiology project in 2003.

Since 2001, hundreds of secondary school students who have won awards at science fairs have had asteroids named after them. The approved naming citation was published by the Minor Planet Center on 30 August 2004 (M.P.C. 52648).
