= Meanings of minor-planet names: 26001–27000 =

As minor planet discoveries are confirmed, they are given a permanent number by the IAU's Minor Planet Center (MPC), and the discoverers can then submit names for them, following the IAU's naming conventions. The list below concerns those minor planets in the specified number-range that have received names, and explains the meanings of those names.

Official naming citations of newly named small Solar System bodies are approved and published in a bulletin by IAU's Working Group for Small Bodies Nomenclature (WGSBN). Before May 2021, citations were published in MPC's Minor Planet Circulars for many decades. Recent citations can also be found on the JPL Small-Body Database (SBDB). Until his death in 2016, German astronomer Lutz D. Schmadel compiled these citations into the Dictionary of Minor Planet Names (DMP) and regularly updated the collection.

Based on Paul Herget's The Names of the Minor Planets, Schmadel also researched the unclear origin of numerous asteroids, most of which had been named prior to World War II. This article incorporates text from this source, which is in the public domain: SBDB New namings may only be added to this list below after official publication as the preannouncement of names is condemned. The WGSBN publishes a comprehensive guideline for the naming rules of non-cometary small Solar System bodies.

== 26001–26100 ==
Named minor planet	Provisional	This minor planet was named for...	Ref · Catalog
26002 Angelayeung	2001 FL_{103}	Angela Yu-Yun Yeung (born 1992) is a finalist in the 2010 Intel Science Talent Search (STS), a science competition for high school seniors, for her materials and bioengineering project. She attends the Davis Senior High School, Davis, California	JPL · 26002
26003 Amundson	2001 FD_{104}	Lauren Amundson (born 1984) is the librarian/archivist for Lowell Observatory. As such, she is the curator for the Observatory's historical collection which includes extensive material from Percival Lowell's personal research and travels.	JPL · 26003
26004 Loriying	2001 FL_{108}	Lori Ying (born 1992) is a finalist in the 2010 Intel Science Talent Search (STS), a science competition for high school seniors, for her animal sciences project. She attends the South Side High School, Rockville Centre, New York	JPL · 26004
26005 Alicezhao	2001 FO_{109}	Alice Wei Zhao (born 1993) is a finalist in the 2010 Intel Science Talent Search (STS), a science competition for high school seniors, for her materials and bioengineering project. She attends the Sheboygan North High School, Sheboygan, Wisconsin	JPL · 26005
26007 Lindazhou	2001 FQ_{120}	Linda Zhou (born 1992) is a finalist in the 2010 Intel Science Talent Search (STS), a science competition for high school seniors, for her biochemistry project. She attends the Academy for Medical Science Technology, Hackensack, New Jersey	JPL · 26007
26011 Cornelius	2001 FA_{136}	Frank Cornelius (born 1961), Engineering Manager at Lowell Observatory, was pivotal in maintaining performance of the Discovery Channel Telescope (DCT) and the Naval Precision Optical Interferometer (NPOI). He previously served as DCT Senior Site Engineer, DCT Site Engineer and NPOI Site Engineer.	JPL · 26011
26012 Sanborn	2001 FG_{148}	Jason Sanborn (born 1975), Night Operations Manager at Lowell Observatory, leads the nightly operations teams at the Discovery Channel Telescope (DCT) and the Naval Precision Optical Interferometer (NPOI). Jason served as a DCT Operator, NPOI Observer and LONEOS Observer.	JPL · 26012
26013 Amandalonzo	2001 FZ_{148}	Amanda Alonzo mentored a finalist in the 2010 Intel Science Talent Search (STS), a science competition for high school seniors. She teaches at the Lynbrook High School, San Jose, California	JPL · 26013
26027 Cotopaxi	4861 P-L	Cotopaxi, the 5897-m active volcano situated in the Andes in Ecuador, south of Quito.	JPL · 26027
26057 Ankaios	4742 T-2	Ancaeus, in Greek mythology, one of the Argonauts, father of Agapenor.	JPL · 26057
26074 Carlwirtz	1977 TD	Carl Wilhelm Wirtz (1875–1939), German astronomer, the first, in 1924, to prove the existence of a redshift-distance relationship for spiral nebulae	JPL · 26074
26075 Levitsvet	1978 PA_{3}	Lev Ivanovich Tsvetkov (born 1938), head of the laboratory of radio astronomy of the Crimean Astrophysical Observatory since 2002, is known for designing and developing instrumentation for observations of solar radio emission, for seeking and identifying global oscillations of the sun and for forecasting solar activity	JPL · 26075
26080 Pablomarques	1980 EF	Pablo Gutierrez-Marques (born 1975), of the Max Planck Institute for Solar System Research, Göttingen, had significant responsibility for the acquisition and processing of the scientific images of Vesta obtained by the Dawn spacecraft.	JPL · 26080
26087 Zhuravleva	1982 UU_{8}	Lyudmila Zhuravleva (born 1946), a Russian–Ukrainian astronomer, discoverer of minor planets, and staff member of the Institute of Theoretical Astronomy (ITA) from 1972 to 1998.	JPL · 26087
26090 Monrovia	1986 PU_{1}	Monrovia, the discoverer's hometown.	JPL · 26090
26092 Norikonoriyuki	1987 SF	Noriko Shimizu (born 1974) is a daughter of the discoverer. She and her husband, Noriyuki Shimizu (born 1966), regularly participate in public viewing nights at Geisei Observatory.	JPL · 26092
26097 Kamishi	1988 VJ_{1}	Kami is a city 20 km east of Kochi city of Japan. It is well known for its natural beauty and as Japan's only landing site of a stony-iron meteorite. The famous Ryugado limestone cave is also located in the city.	IAU · 26097

== 26101–26200 ==
back to top

Named minor planet	Provisional	This minor planet was named for...	Ref · Catalog
26104 Masayukimori	1990 VV_{1}	Masayuki Mori (b. 1957), a Japanese manga artist.	IAU · 26104
26119 Duden	1991 TN_{7}	Konrad Duden (1829–1911), German philologist and author of the Duden, a key dictionary of the German language. It is the basis for uniform orthography in the German-speaking world and has since gone through more than 20 revised editions.	JPL · 26119
26122 Antonysutton	1992 CS_{2}	Antony Cyril Sutton (1925–2002) studied economics at universities in London, Göttingen and California. At Stanford University's Hoover Institution he wrote his three-volume study Western Technology and Soviet Economic Development between 1968 and 1973.	JPL · 26122
26123 Hiroshiyoshida	1992 OK	Hiroshi Yoshida (born 1968) is an amateur astronomer and has been involved in the networking of people running stargazing parties in eastern Japan. He also promotes exchange of information, reporting on research activity, and get-togethers for amateur astronomers involved in outreach activity.	IAU · 26123
26127 Otakasakajyo	1993 BL_{2}	Otakasakajyo is the former name of the medieval castle that stands on a hill with a sweeping view of Kochi City and serves as the city's symbol	JPL · 26127
26151 Irinokaigan	1994 TT_{3}	Irino, a beautiful beach ("kaigan") lined with pine groves, is located in Kuroshio, Kochi prefecture. The town's museum, displaying various objects washed up on the beach and brought by the Kuroshio current from faraway places, captivates the visitors with romantic fascination	JPL · 26151
26168 Kanaikiyotaka	1995 WT_{8}	Kiyotaka Kanai (born 1951), Japanese amateur astronomer, member of "Ota Uchuno Kai" astronomical group, independent discoverer of comet C/1970 B1 and co-discoverer of asteroid 7752 Otauchunokai.	JPL · 26168
26169 Ishikawakiyoshi	1995 YY	Akiyoshi Ishikawa (born 1955), a Japanese amateur astronomer, is a member of the "Ota Uchuno Kai" astronomical group. A devoted comet observer, he has had more than 1100 visual magnitude estimates published in the International Comet Quarterly since 1980. The name was suggested by A. Nakamura.	JPL · 26169
26170 Kazuhiko	1996 BH_{2}	Kazuhiko Ichikawa (born 1956), a Japanese amateur astronomer, is one of the founders of the Yamaneko Group of Comet Observers and a member of the "Ota Uchuno Kai" astronomical group. An organizer of the Cometary Summer School, an advanced workshop for comet research, he has mentored many amateur comet researchers.	JPL · 26170
26171 Katsunorikataoka	1996 BY_{2}	Katsunori Kataoka (born 1965), editor of an amateur Japanese astronomical magazine.	JPL · 26171
26177 Fabiodolfi	1996 GN_{2}	Fabio Dolfi (born 1966), an Italian amateur astronomer who has devoted all his spare time to astronomy. Beginning in 1978, he took a special interest tn the photography of deep-sky objects. Subsequently, he collaborated with the program for astrometry of minor planets at the Pistoia Mountains Astronomical Observatory in San Marcello, Italy.	JPL · 26177
26183 Henrigodard	1996 HG_{15}	Henri Godard (born 1937) is a professor of French literature at the Universities of Diderot and Sorbonne in Paris.	JPL · 26183
26188 Zengqingcun	1996 YE_{2}	Zeng Qingcun (born 1935) is a leading atmospheric scientist and an Academician of the Chinese Academy of Sciences. He is one of the founders of modern numerical weather forecast by using atmospheric primitive equations in the world, and won the State Preeminent Science and Technology Award of China in 2019.	IAU · 26188
26194 Chasolivier	1997 CO_{26}	Charles P. Olivier (1884–1975) was an American astronomer who, with William Denning in England, developed the scientific visual study of meteors. He founded the American Meteor Society in 1911 and led the AMS for decades. He encouraged many young observers, including the discoverer, J. Montani	JPL · 26194
26195 Černohlávek	1997 EN	Ivo Černohlávek (1960–1995) pioneered the Internet in the Czech Republic, cofounded the Czech academic network and helped to establish Brno as a center in information technology. A sportsman awarded the Fair Play prize for the rescue of a colleague on wild water, he died on a river in Norway.	JPL · 26195
26197 Bormio	1997 FN_{1}	The town of Bormio in Italy. Bormio is a very ancient and pleasant village in the Rhaetian Alps, 200 kilometers from Milan. It hosts a biennial meeting on planetary sciences, and the name was suggested by A. Manara on the occasion of the fourth meeting in the series.Src/Src	JPL · 26197
26199 Aileenperry	1997 GP_{13}	Aileen Perry mentored a finalist in the 2012 Intel Science Talent Search, a science competition for high-school seniors.	JPL · 26199
26200 Van Doren	1997 GF_{17}	Benjamin Mark Van Doren (born 1994) is a finalist in the 2012 Intel Science Talent Search, a science competition for high-school seniors, for his animal-sciences project.	JPL · 26200

== 26201–26300 ==
back to top

Named minor planet	Provisional	This minor planet was named for...	Ref · Catalog
26201 Sayonisaha	1997 GD_{24}	Sayoni Saha (born 1994) is a finalist in the 2012 Intel Science Talent Search, a science competition for high-school seniors, for her behavioral and social-sciences project.	JPL · 26201
26205 Kuratowski	1997 LA_{5}	Kazimierz Kuratowski (1896–1980), Polish mathematician	JPL · 26205
26210 Lingas	1997 RC_{3}	Lingas plateau, in the Parc national des Cévennes (Cévennes National Park), site of the Observatoire des Pises	JPL · 26210
26213 Ayani	1997 UV_{8}	Kazuya Ayani (born 1959), director of Bisei Astronomical Observatory.	JPL · 26213
26214 Kalinga	1997 US_{10}	UNESCO's Kalinga Prize (bearing the old name of the Indian state of Orissa)	JPL · 26214
26223 Enari	1997 XB_{2}	On 23 November 2001, Akihiko Enari (born 1980) became the first amateur radio operator (call sign JK1ZAM) in Japan to succeed in contacting the International Space Station in the course of the NASA program "Amateur Radio on the ISS"	JPL · 26223
26227 Tan	1998 HJ_{7}	Nicole Jieyi Tan, Singaporean astronomer.	IAU · 26227
26232 Antink	1998 QW_{8}	Suzanne Antink mentored a finalist in the 2010 Intel Science Talent Search (STS), a science competition for high school seniors. She teaches at the Palo Alto Senior High School, Palo Alto, California	JPL · 26232
26233 Jimbraun	1998 QS_{11}	Jim Braun mentored a finalist in the 2010 Intel Science Talent Search (STS), a science competition for high school seniors. He teaches at the Naperville Central High School, Naperville, Illinois	JPL · 26233
26234 Leslibrinson	1998 QV_{12}	Leslie Brinson mentored a finalist in the 2010 Intel Science Talent Search (STS), a science competition for high school seniors. She teaches at the North Carolina School of Science & Mathematics, Durham, North Carolina	JPL · 26234
26235 Annemaduggan	1998 QU_{18}	Annemarie Duggan mentored a finalist in the 2010 Intel Science Talent Search (STS), a science competition for high school seniors. She teaches at the Shrewsbury High School, Shrewsbury, Massachusetts	JPL · 26235
26238 Elduval	1998 QE_{32}	Elizabeth Duval mentored a finalist in the 2010 Intel Science Talent Search (STS), a science competition for high school seniors. She teaches at the Montgomery Blair High School, Silver Spring, Maryland	JPL · 26238
26240 Leigheriks	1998 QX_{39}	Leigh Eriks mentored a finalist in the 2010 Intel Science Talent Search (STS), a science competition for high school seniors. She teaches at the Catholic Central High School, Grand Rapids, Michigan	JPL · 26240
26243 Sallyfenska	1998 QE_{42}	Sally Fenska mentored a finalist in the 2010 Intel Science Talent Search (STS), a science competition for high school seniors. She teaches at the Miami High School, Miami, Oklahoma	JPL · 26243
26246 Mikelake	1998 QN_{46}	Michael Lake mentored a finalist in the 2010 Intel Science Talent Search (STS), a science competition for high school seniors. He teaches at the Half Hollow Hills High School West, Dix Hills, New York	JPL · 26246
26247 Doleonardi	1998 QW_{47}	Donna Leonardi mentored a finalist in the 2010 Intel Science Talent Search (STS), a science competition for high school seniors. She teaches at the Academy for Medical Science Technology, Hackensack, New Jersey	JPL · 26247
26248 Longenecker	1998 QZ_{48}	Nevin Longenecker mentored a finalist in the 2010 Intel Science Talent Search (STS), a science competition for high school seniors. He teaches at the John Adams High School, South Bend, Indiana	JPL · 26248
26250 Shaneludwig	1998 QP_{51}	Shane Ludwig mentored a finalist in the 2010 Intel Science Talent Search (STS), a science competition for high school seniors. He teaches at the Woodcrest Christian School, Riverside, California	JPL · 26250
26251 Kiranmanne	1998 QG_{52}	Kiran Manne mentored a finalist in the 2010 Intel Science Talent Search (STS), a science competition for high school seniors. He teaches at the Albuquerque Academy, Albuquerque, New Mexico	JPL · 26251
26252 Chase	1998 QV_{54}	David Chase (born 1941) is a member of Lowell Observatory's advisory board. As a diligent board member, David gives generously of his time. He serves on Lowell Observatory's Foundation Board and two other committees. His talent helps Lowell Observatory full its mission.	JPL · 26252
26255 Carmarques	1998 QW_{68}	Carlos Marques mentored a finalist in the 2010 Intel Science Talent Search (STS), a science competition for high school seniors. He teaches at the State University of New York College of Technology at Farmingdale	JPL · 26255
26259 Marzigliano	1998 QK_{108}	Gerard Marzigliano mentored a finalist in the 2010 Intel Science Talent Search (STS), a science competition for high school seniors. He teaches at the Division Avenue High School, Levittown, New York	JPL · 26259
26261 Tinafreeman	1998 RL_{6}	Tina Freeman (born 1955) has volunteered in the Lowell Observatory Archives since 2012. She has organized and cataloged the correspondence of Lowell Observatory historian William Graves Hoyt.	JPL · 26261
26264 McIntyre	1998 RH_{44}	Nancy McIntyre mentored a finalist in the 2010 Intel Science Talent Search (STS), a science competition for high school seniors. She teaches at the Chaminade College Preparatory, West Hills, California	JPL · 26264
26266 Andrewmerrill	1998 RW_{47}	Andrew Merrill mentored a finalist in the 2010 Intel Science Talent Search (STS), a science competition for high school seniors. He teaches at the Catlin Gabel School, Portland, Oregon	JPL · 26266
26267 Nickmorgan	1998 RS_{50}	Nicholas Morgan mentored a finalist in the 2010 Intel Science Talent Search (STS), a science competition for high school seniors. He teaches at the Staples High School, Westport, Connecticut	JPL · 26267
26268 Nardi	1998 RY_{55}	Patricia Nardi mentored a finalist in the 2010 Intel Science Talent Search (STS), a science competition for high school seniors. She teaches at the George W. Hewlett High School, Hewlett, New York	JPL · 26268
26269 Marciaprill	1998 RG_{57}	Marcia Prill mentored a finalist in the 2010 Intel Science Talent Search (STS), a science competition for high school seniors. She teaches at the Madison High School, Madison, New Jersey	JPL · 26269
26271 Lindapuster	1998 RW_{63}	Linda Puster mentored a finalist in the 2010 Intel Science Talent Search (STS), a science competition for high school seniors. She teaches at the Plano West Senior High School, Plano, Texas	JPL · 26271
26273 Kateschafer	1998 RD_{71}	Katherine Schafer mentored a finalist in the 2010 Intel Science Talent Search (STS), a science competition for high school seniors. She teaches at the Harker School, San Jose, California	JPL · 26273
26275 Jefsoulier	1998 SN_{1}	Jean François Soulier (born 1966), a specialized educator and dedicated comet observer.	JPL · 26275
26276 Natrees	1998 SL_{4}	Nathaniel Paul Rees, grandson of the discoverer	JPL · 26276
26277 Ianrees	1998 SM_{4}	Ian Hudson Rees, grandson of the discoverer	JPL · 26277
26282 Noahbrosch	1998 SD_{56}	Noah Brosch, (born 1948) is a Tel-Aviv University scientist broadly studying dwarf galaxies, Pluto, asteroids, comets, and meteors. He was the principal investigator of the TAUVEX space telescope initiative. Brosch served as the principal of the Wise observatory	JPL · 26282
26283 Oswalt	1998 ST_{58}	Terry Oswalt (born 1952) is an American astronomer working in the fields of stellar and planetary astronomy. He has led or participated in observing campaigns for numerous occultations involving the Moon, planets and minor solar system bodies, including one of the first determinations of the size, shape, and density of 1 Ceres.	JPL · 26283
26284 Johnspahn	1998 SZ_{59}	John Spahn (born 1944) has volunteered at Lowell Observatory since 2012. He has helped with various projects in Development, Archives, the volunteer program and the business office, including donor research and the cataloging of books, glass plate negatives, and other artifacts.	JPL · 26284
26285 Lindaspahn	1998 SS_{61}	Linda Spahn (born 1945) has volunteered at Lowell Observatory since 2012. She has helped with projects in the Archives, such as cataloging, and has also contributed her skills to gardening and beautifying the Lowell campus.	JPL · 26285
26291 Terristaples	1998 SU_{106}	Terri Staples mentored a finalist in the 2010 Intel Science Talent Search (STS), a science competition for high school seniors. She teaches at the Red River High School, Grand Forks, North Dakota	JPL · 26291
26293 Van Muyden	1998 SD_{110}	David Van Muyden mentored a finalist in the 2010 Intel Science Talent Search (STS), a science competition for high school seniors. He teaches at the Davis Senior High School, Davis, California	JPL · 26293
26295 Vilardi	1998 SD_{112}	Virginia Vilardi mentored a finalist in the 2010 Intel Science Talent Search (STS), a science competition for high school seniors. She teaches at the Wetumpka High School, Wetumpka, Alabama	JPL · 26295
26298 Dunweathers	1998 SD_{124}	Duncan Weathers mentored a finalist in the 2010 Intel Science Talent Search (STS), a science competition for high school seniors. He teaches at the Texas Academy of Mathematics & Science, Denton, Texas	JPL · 26298
26300 Herbweiss	1998 ST_{134}	Herb Weiss mentored a finalist in the 2010 Intel Science Talent Search (STS), a science competition for high school seniors. He teaches at the South Side High School, Rockville Centre, New York	JPL · 26300

== 26301–26400 ==
back to top

Named minor planet	Provisional	This minor planet was named for...	Ref · Catalog
26301 Hellawillis	1998 SB_{136}	Hella Willis mentored a finalist in the 2010 Intel Science Talent Search (STS), a science competition for high school seniors. She teaches at the Sheboygan North High School, Sheboygan, Wisconsin	JPL · 26301
26302 Zimolzak	1998 ST_{142}	Matt Zimolzak mentored a finalist in the 2010 Intel Science Talent Search (STS), a science competition for high school seniors. He teaches at the William Fremd High School, Palatine, Illinois	JPL · 26302
26307 Friedafein	1998 SE_{163}	Frieda Rose Fein (born 1991) is a finalist in the 2010 Intel Science Talent Search (STS), a science competition for high school seniors, for her behavioral and social sciences project. She attends the John Adams High School, South Bend, Indiana	JPL · 26307
26312 Ciardi	1998 TG_{34}	David Ciardi (born 1969) is an astronomer at the California Institute of Technology. His research interests include detection, validation and characterization of extrasolar planets, as well as characterization of young stellar objects.	JPL · 26312
26313 Lorilombardi	1998 TK_{34}	Lori Lombardi (born 1955) has volunteered in the Lowell Observatory Archives since 2013. She has assisted with moving materials to the Putnam Collection Center and organizing and cataloging collections.	JPL · 26313
26314 Škvorecký	1998 UJ_{1}	Josef Škvorecký (1924–2012), Czech-Canadian writer and publisher of the post-World War II generation	MPC · 26314
26319 Miyauchi	1998 UM_{23}	Miyauchi town is situated in the southern part of Nanyo city, Yamagata, Japan.	JPL · 26319
26323 Wuqijin	1998 VX_{8}	Wu Qijin (born 1992) was awarded second place in the 2010 Intel International Science and Engineering Fair for her animal-sciences project. She attends the Fuzhou No. 1 Middle School, Fuzhou, Fujian, China	JPL · 26323
26328 Litomyšl	1998 WQ	Litomyšl, a medieval town located in eastern Bohemia, Czech Republic. This traditional cultural center is known for its architectural monuments, including a Renaissance castle and a square surrounded by Renaissance and baroque houses. It is the birthplace of composer Bedřich Smetana and astronomer Zdeněk Kopal.	MPC · 26328
26329 Cleoabram	1998 WC_{1}	Cleo Abram, American YouTube science educator.	IAU · 26329
26331 Kondamuri	1998 WC_{10}	Neil Kondamuri (born 1992) was awarded second place in the 2010 Intel International Science and Engineering Fair for his animal-sciences project. He attends the Munster High School, Munster, Indiana, U.S.A	JPL · 26331
26332 Alyssehrlich	1998 WW_{10}	Alyssa Chelsea Ehrlich (born 1992) was awarded second place in the 2010 Intel International Science and Engineering Fair for her animal-sciences project. She attends the South Side High School, Rockville Centre, New York, U.S.A	JPL · 26332
26333 Joachim	1998 WU_{11}	Gabriel Thailand Joachim (born 1993) was awarded best of category and first place in the 2010 Intel International Science and Engineering Fair for his animal-sciences project. He attends the Cibola High School, Albuquerque, New Mexico, U.S.A	JPL · 26333
26334 Melimcdowell	1998 WD_{15}	Melissa Severn McDowell (born 1992) was awarded best of category and first place in the 2010 Intel International Science and Engineering Fair for her animal-sciences team project. She attends the Saint Joseph's Academy, Baton Rouge, Louisiana, U.S.A	JPL · 26334
26336 Mikemcdowell	1998 WC_{17}	Michael Charles McDowell (born 1995) was awarded best of category and first place in the 2010 Intel International Science and Engineering Fair for his animal-sciences team project. He attends the Catholic High School, Baton Rouge, Louisiana, U.S.A	JPL · 26336
26337 Matthewagam	1998 WJ_{19}	Matthew Samuel Agam (born 1993) was awarded second place in the 2010 Intel International Science and Engineering Fair for his behavioral- and social-sciences project. He attends the Beaverton High School, Beaverton, Oregon, U.S.A	JPL · 26337
26340 Evamarková	1998 XY_{8}	Eva Marková (born 1949), a Czech astronomer interested in solar astronomy who has led eight expeditions to observe total solar eclipses. Since 1986 she has served as director of the Úpice Observatory, where she is also engaged in astronomy education, including summer youth astronomy camps.	JPL · 26340
26345 Gedankien	1998 XQ_{77}	Tamara Gedankien (born 1992) was awarded best of category and first place in the 2010 Intel International Science and Engineering Fair for her behavioral- and social-sciences project. She attends the Escola Brasileira Israelita Chaim Nachman Bialik, São Paulo, Brazil	JPL · 26345
26355 Grueber	1998 YL_{8}	Johann Grueber, (1623–1680) was a Jesuit priest, missionary, mathematician and astronomer at the Chinese imperial court from 1659 to 1661. He returned to Europe from China by the overland route and published the very first travelogue describing Tibet.	JPL · 26355
26356 Aventini	1998 YE_{10}	Andrea Aventini (born 1952), Italian amateur astronomer at the Pistoia Mountains Astronomical Observatory	JPL · 26356
26357 Laguerre	1998 YK_{10}	Edmond Laguerre (1834–1886), French mathematician	JPL · 26357
26368 Alghunaim	1999 CJ_{37}	Abdulaziz Khalid Alghunaim (born 1992) was awarded second place in the 2010 Intel International Science and Engineering Fair for his behavioral- and social-sciences project. He attends the Asrary School, Riyadh, Saudi Arabia	JPL · 26368
26376 Roborosa	1999 EB_{3}	Róbert Rosa (1964–1994), a Slovak amateur astronomer and computer graphic designer who participated in the development of the graphic layout of the Slovak bimonthly journal Kozmos. He died in an accident at Fačkovské sedlo during the eleventh astronomy bike tour "Ebicykl"	JPL · 26376
26382 Charlieduke	1999 LT_{32}	Charles Duke (born 1935) is a retired American astronaut, test pilot and U.S. Air Force officer. In 1972 he became the 10th and youngest person to walk on the Moon, serving as lunar module pilot for the Apollo 16 mission.	JPL · 26382
26386 Adelinacozma	1999 RC_{171}	Adelina Corina Cozma (born 1995) was awarded second place in the 2010 Intel International Science and Engineering Fair for her behavioral- and social-sciences project. She attends the Bayview Secondary School, Richmond Hill, Ontario, Canada	JPL · 26386
26389 Poojarambhia	1999 TO_{151}	Pooja Rambhia (born 1992) was awarded second place in the 2010 Intel International Science and Engineering Fair for her biochemistry project. She attends the Jericho High School, Jericho, New York, U.S.A	JPL · 26389
26390 Rušin	1999 UX_{2}	Vojtech Rušin (born 1942), a Slovak solar physicist known for his contribution to dynamics of prominences and corona. He was one of the first observers at the Lomnický štít coronal station and greatly engaged in its further development.	JPL · 26390
26393 Scaffa	1999 VT_{35}	Alejandro Mariano Scaffa (born 1992) was awarded best of category and first place in the 2010 Intel International Science and Engineering Fair for his biochemistry project. He attends the Escola Americana de Campinas, Campinas, São Paulo, Brazil	JPL · 26393
26394 Kandola	1999 VE_{53}	Manjinder Singh Kandola (born 1992) was awarded second place in the 2010 Intel International Science and Engineering Fair for his biochemistry project. He attends the Queens High School for the Sciences at York College, Jamaica, New York, U.S.A	JPL · 26394
26395 Megkurohara	1999 VK_{150}	Megan M. Kurohara (born 1993) was awarded second place in the 2010 Intel International Science and Engineering Fair for her biochemistry team project. She attends the Hilo High School, Hilo, Hawaii, U.S.A	JPL · 26395
26396 Chengjingjie	1999 VQ_{169}	Cheng Jingjie (born 1994) was awarded second place in the 2010 Intel International Science and Engineering Fair for her cellular- and molecular-biology project. She attends the Raffles Girls' School, Singapore	JPL · 26396
26397 Carolynsinow	1999 VB_{185}	Carolyn Sinow (born 1992) was awarded first place in the 2010 Intel International Science and Engineering Fair for her cellular- and molecular-biology project. She attends the Palos Verdes Peninsula High School, Rolling Hills Estates, California, U.S.A	JPL · 26397
26399 Rileyennis	1999 VG_{189}	Riley C. Ennis (born 1993) was awarded second place in the 2010 Intel International Science and Engineering Fair for his cellular- and molecular-biology project. He attends the Thomas Jefferson High School for Science and Technology, Alexandria, Virginia, U.S.A	JPL · 26399
26400 Roshanpalli	1999 VJ_{190}	Roshan Palli (born 1994) was awarded second place in the 2010 Intel International Science and Engineering Fair for his cellular- and molecular-biology team project. He attends the Paul Laurence Dunbar High School, Lexington, Kentucky, U.S.A	JPL · 26400

== 26401–26500 ==
back to top

Named minor planet	Provisional	This minor planet was named for...	Ref · Catalog
26401 Sobotište	1999 WX	Sobotište, a village in southwestern Slovakia, home of an astronomical observatory	JPL · 26401
26411 Jocorbferg	1999 XA_{40}	Joseph Corbett Ferguson (born 1992) was awarded second place in the 2010 Intel International Science and Engineering Fair for his cellular- and molecular-biology team project. He currently works as a research scientist at NASA Ames Research Center	JPL · 26411
26412 Charlesyu	1999 XR_{60}	Charles Cheng Yu (born 1994) was awarded first place in the 2010 Intel International Science and Engineering Fair for his cellular- and molecular-biology team project. He attends the Wheatley School, Old Westbury, New York, U.S.A	JPL · 26412
26414 Amychyao	1999 XS_{65}	Amy Cindy Chyao (born 1994) was awarded best of category and first place in the 2010 Intel International Science and Engineering Fair for her chemistry project. She attends the Williams High School, Plano, Texas, U.S.A	JPL · 26414
26417 Michaelgord	1999 XO_{87}	Michael Aaron Gord (born 1992) was awarded second place in the 2010 Intel International Science and Engineering Fair for his chemistry project. He attends the Dayton Christian High School, Miamisburg, Ohio, U.S.A	JPL · 26417
26422 Marekbuchman	1999 XV_{131}	Marek Buchman (born 1993) was awarded second place in the 2010 Intel International Science and Engineering Fair for his chemistry project. He attends the School for Extraordinary Gifted Children, Bratislava, Slovakia	JPL · 26422
26424 Jacquelihung	1999 XT_{152}	Hung Jacqueline (born 1991) was awarded first place in the 2010 Intel International Science and Engineering Fair for her chemistry team project. She attends the Taipei Municipal First Girls' Senior High School, Taipei City, Chinese Taipei	JPL · 26424
26425 Linchichieh	1999 XR_{156}	Lin Chi-Chieh (born 1992) was awarded first place in the 2010 Intel International Science and Engineering Fair for her chemistry team project. She attends the Taipei Municipal First Girls' Senior High School, Taipei City, Chinese Taipei	JPL · 26425
26426 Koechl	1999 XB_{158}	Juergen Koechl (born 1990) was awarded second place in the 2010 Intel International Science and Engineering Fair for his chemistry team project. He attends the HTL Braunau am Inn, Braunau am Inn, Austria	JPL · 26426
26429 Andiwagner	1999 XG_{170}	Andreas Wagner (born 1990) was awarded second place in the 2010 Intel International Science and Engineering Fair for his chemistry team project. He attends the HTL Braunau am Inn, Braunau am Inn, Austria	JPL · 26429
26430 Thomwilkason	1999 XW_{176}	Thomas Frederick Wilkason (born 1993) was awarded second place in the 2010 Intel International Science and Engineering Fair for his computer-science project. He attends the Mount de Sales Academy, Macon, Georgia, U.S.A	JPL · 26430
26433 Michaelyurko	1999 XK_{215}	Michael Christopher Yurko (born 1993) was awarded second place in the 2010 Intel International Science and Engineering Fair for his computer-science project. He attends the Detroit Catholic Central High School, Novi, Michigan, U.S.A	JPL · 26433
26435 Juliebrisset	1999 XS_{241}	Julie Brisset (born 1981) is a scientist at the Florida Space Institute-UCF (Orlando, FL). Her research focuses on the behavior of dust grains in microgravity conditions with applications to the structure of small body surfaces and rings in the Solar System.	IAU · 26435
26438 Durling	1999 YE_{13}	Susanne Durling (born 1932) is a long-time member of Lowell Observatory's advisory board. As a member of the Board Sue gives of her time and talent. She also serves on the Putnam Collection Center Committee, which advises on the preservation of Lowell's collection of artifacts.	IAU · 26438
26441 Nanayakkara	2000 AX_{33}	Ganindu Nanayakkara (born 1990) was awarded first place in the 2010 Intel International Science and Engineering Fair for his computer-science project. He attends the Ananda College, Colombo, Sri Lanka	JPL · 26441
26442 Matfernandez	2000 AK_{41}	Matthew Fernandez (born 1993) was awarded best of category and first place in the 2010 Intel International Science and Engineering Fair for his computer-science team project. He attends the Oregon Episcopal School, Portland, Oregon, U.S.A	JPL · 26442
26447 Akrishnan	2000 AX_{67}	Akash Krishnan (born 1994) was awarded best of category and first place in the 2010 Intel International Science and Engineering Fair for his computer-science team project. He attends the Oregon Episcopal School, Portland, Oregon, U.S.A	JPL · 26447
26448 Tongjili	2000 AC_{76}	Tongji Li (born 1992) was awarded second place in the 2010 Intel International Science and Engineering Fair for her earth-science project. She attends the Hershey High School, Hershey, Pennsylvania, U.S.A	JPL · 26448
26450 Tanyapetach	2000 AQ_{85}	Tanya Nicole Petach (born 1994) was awarded second place in the 2010 Intel International Science and Engineering Fair for her earth-science project. She attends the Fairview High School, Boulder, Colorado, U.S.A	JPL · 26450
26451 Khweis	2000 AB_{86}	Majdolene Ziad Khweis (born 1993) was awarded best of category and first place in the 2010 Intel International Science and Engineering Fair for her earth-science project. She attends the Taos High School, Taos, New Mexico, U.S.A	JPL · 26451
26455 Priyamshah	2000 AP_{95}	Priyam C. Shah (born 1992) was awarded first place in the 2010 Intel International Science and Engineering Fair for his earth-science team project. He attends the Sunset High School, Portland, Oregon, U.S.A	JPL · 26455
26457 Naomishah	2000 AL_{105}	Naomi C. Shah (born 1995) was awarded first place in the 2010 Intel International Science and Engineering Fair for her earth-science team project. She attends the Sunset High School, Portland, Oregon, U.S.A	JPL · 26457
26458 Choihyuna	2000 AC_{110}	Choi Hyun-A (born 1992) was awarded second place in the 2010 Intel International Science and Engineering Fair for her earth-science team project. She attends the Damyang High School, Damyang-gun, Jeollanam-do, South Korea	JPL · 26458
26459 Shinsubin	2000 AD_{117}	Shin Subin (born 1992) was awarded second place in the 2010 Intel International Science and Engineering Fair for her earth-science team project. She attends the Damyang High School, Damyang-gun, Jeollanam-do, South Korea	JPL · 26459
26462 Albertcui	2000 AL_{126}	Albert Cui (born 1991) was awarded second place in the 2010 Intel International Science and Engineering Fair for his electrical- and mechanical-engineering project. He attends the Hillcrest High School, Midvale, Utah, U.S.A	JPL · 26462
26466 Zarrin	2000 AA_{142}	David Andrew Zarrin (born 1995) was awarded first place in the 2010 Intel International Science and Engineering Fair for his electrical- and mechanical-engineering project. He attends the Saratoga High School, Saratoga, California, U.S.A	JPL · 26466
26467 Jamespopper	2000 AX_{142}	James Sinclair Popper (born 1992) was awarded best of category and first place in the 2010 Intel International Science and Engineering Fair for his electrical- and mechanical-engineering project. He attends the Marlborough College, Marlborough, Wiltshire, United Kingdom	JPL · 26467
26468 Ianchan	2000 AO_{143}	Ian Chan (born 1991) was awarded second place in the 2010 Intel International Science and Engineering Fair for his electrical- and mechanical-engineering team project. He attends the Plano East Senior High School, Plano, Texas, U.S.A	JPL · 26468
26471 Tracybecker	2000 AS_{152}	Tracy Michelle Becker (born 1986) determined the shapes of the components of asteroid (153591) 2001 SN263, the first triple-asteroid system discovered in the near-Earth population. She did this work as a student working at the Arecibo Observatory, earning a Ph.D. in 2016.	JPL · 26471
26474 Davidsimon	2000 AA_{175}	David Szabolcs Simon (born 1991) was awarded second place in the 2010 Intel International Science and Engineering Fair for his electrical- and mechanical-engineering team project. He attends the Szent Margit Secondary School, Budapest, Hungary	JPL · 26474
26475 Krisztisugar	2000 AD_{185}	Krisztina Sugar (born 1991) was awarded second place in the 2010 Intel International Science and Engineering Fair for her electrical- and mechanical-engineering team project. She attends the Szent Margit Secondary School, Budapest, Hungary	JPL · 26475
26478 Cristianrosu	2000 AM_{197}	Cristian Emilian Rosu (born 1991) was awarded first place in the 2010 Intel International Science and Engineering Fair for his electrical- and mechanical-engineering team project. He attends the Emanuil Gojdu National College, Oradea, Bihor, Romania	JPL · 26478
26485 Edwinpost	2000 AD_{231}	Edwin Post (born 1953) is a member of Lowell Observatory's advisory board. Ed supports Lowell Observatory in its mission to bring astronomical research results to the general public. Ed is a software engineer who specializes in graphic design and animation.	JPL · 26485
26488 Beiser	2000 AB_{242}	Antoinette S. Beiser (born 1956), Lowell Observatory's librarian for twenty years, now concentrates on fundraising	JPL · 26488
26493 Paulsucala	2000 BQ_{16}	Paul Stelian Sucala (born 1991) was awarded first place in the 2010 Intel International Science and Engineering Fair for his electrical- and mechanical-engineering team project. He attends the Silvania National College, Zalau, Rhode Island, U.S.A	JPL · 26493
26495 Eichorn	2000 BX_{22}	Will Eichorn (born 1943), an amateur astronomer and retired Dow Chemical optical technician, living in Bay City, Michigan.	JPL · 26495
26498 Dinotina	2000 CV_{1}	Dino and Tina Grifoni, uncle and aunt of Italian astronomer Andrea Boattini who co-discovered this minor planet	JPL · 26498
26499 Robertazabotti	2000 CX_{1}	Roberta Zabotti (born 1957) is the cofounder of Il Cielo and Coelum, two Italian astronomy magazines. Since the 1990s, she has worked in the scientific publishing sector.	IAU · 26499
26500 Toshiohino	2000 CC_{2}	Toshio Hino (born 1950), Japanese astronomer	JPL · 26500

== 26501–26600 ==
back to top

Named minor planet	Provisional	This minor planet was named for...	Ref · Catalog
26501 Sachiko	2000 CP_{2}	Sachiko Nagata, teacher of Oshibana, the Japanese art of arranging pressed flowers	JPL · 26501
26502 Traviscole	2000 CQ_{5}	Travis Cole Sylvester (born 1993) was awarded second place in the 2010 Intel International Science and Engineering Fair for his environmental-management project. He attends the Greybull High School, Greybull, Wyoming, U.S.A	JPL · 26502
26503 Avicramer	2000 CA_{9}	Avilash Kalpathy Cramer (born 1993) was awarded best of category and first place in the 2010 Intel International Science and Engineering Fair for his environmental-management project. He attends the West Linn High School, West Linn, Oregon, U.S.A	JPL · 26503
26504 Brandonli	2000 CM_{17}	Brandon Li (born 1992) was awarded second place in the 2010 Intel International Science and Engineering Fair for his environmental-management project. He attends the Jericho High School, Jericho, New York, U.S.A	JPL · 26504
26505 Olextokarev	2000 CX_{21}	Olexandr Tokarev (born 1993) was awarded second place in the 2010 Intel International Science and Engineering Fair for his environmental-management project. He attends the Chemical Ecological Lyceum, Dnipropetrovsk, Ukraine	JPL · 26505
26507 Mikelin	2000 CC_{29}	Michael Lin (born 1993) was awarded second place in the 2010 Intel International Science and Engineering Fair for his environmental-management team project. He attends the Robert Louis Stevenson Upper School, Pebble Beach, California, U.S.A	JPL · 26507
26508 Jimmylin	2000 CD_{29}	Jimmy Lin (born 1994) was awarded second place in the 2010 Intel International Science and Engineering Fair for his environmental-management team project. He attends the Robert Louis Stevenson Upper School, Pebble Beach, California, U.S.A	JPL · 26508
26513 Newberry	2000 CP_{47}	William Cummings Newberry (born 1991) was awarded first place in the 2010 Intel International Science and Engineering Fair for his materials-and-bioengineering project. He attends the Greenwich High School, Greenwich, Connecticut, U.S.A	JPL · 26513
26518 Bhuiyan	2000 CM_{65}	Mubarrat Nuvid Bhuiyan (born 1992) was awarded second place in the 2010 Intel International Science and Engineering Fair for her materials-and-bioengineering project. She attends the Jericho High School, Jericho, New York, U.S.A	JPL · 26518
26522 Juliapoje	2000 CZ_{83}	Julia Elizabeth Poje (born 1992) was awarded second place in the 2010 Intel International Science and Engineering Fair for her materials-and-bioengineering project. She attends the Valley Stream South High School, Valley Stream, New York, U.S.A	JPL · 26522
26526 Jookayhyun	2000 CP_{86}	Joo Kay Hyun (born 1992) was awarded best of category and first place in the 2010 Intel International Science and Engineering Fair for her materials-and-bioengineering project. She attends the Changduk Girls High School, Seoul, South Korea	JPL · 26526
26527 Leasure	2000 CH_{87}	Audrey Christine Leasure (born 1993) was awarded first place in the 2010 Intel International Science and Engineering Fair for her materials-and-bioengineering team project. She attends the Lake Highland Preparatory School, Orlando, Florida, U.S.A	JPL · 26527
26528 Genniferubin	2000 CL_{92}	Gennifer Reid Rubin (born 1992) was awarded first place in the 2010 Intel International Science and Engineering Fair for her materials-and-bioengineering team project. She attends the Lake Highland Preparatory School, Orlando, Florida, U.S.A	JPL · 26528
26530 Lucferreira	2000 CY_{96}	Lucas Strasburg Ferreira (born 1991) was awarded second place in the 2010 Intel International Science and Engineering Fair for his materials-and-bioengineering team project. He attends the Fundacao Escola Tecnica Liberato Salzano Vieira da Cunha, Novo Hamburgo, Rio Grande do Sul, Brazil	JPL · 26530
26532 Eduardoboff	2000 CZ_{102}	Eduardo Trierweiler Boff (born 1991) was awarded second place in the 2010 Intel International Science and Engineering Fair for his materials-and-bioengineering team project. He attends the Fundacao Escola Tecnica Liberato Salzano Vieira da Cunha, Novo Hamburgo, Rio Grande do Sul, Brazil	JPL · 26532
26533 Aldering	2000 CG_{108}	Greg Aldering (born 1962), a member of Supernova Cosmology Project studying the use of Type Ia supernovae for determining cosmological parameters.	JPL · 26533
26537 Shyamalbuch	2000 DA_{5}	Shyamal Buch (born 1995) was awarded best of category and first place in the 2010 Intel International Science and Engineering Fair for his energy-and-transportation project. He attends the Vista del Lago High School, Folsom, California, U.S.A	JPL · 26537
26541 Garyross	2000 DV_{15}	Gary Ross (born 1945) has served on the executive board of the Grand Rapids Astronomical Society and Warren Astronomical Society in southern Michigan. He has also been instrumental in the operation of the James C. Veen observatory in Lowell, Michigan, for over 40 years.	JPL · 26541
26544 Ajjarapu	2000 DN_{37}	Avanthi Sai Ajjarapu (born 1993) was awarded second place in the 2010 Intel International Science and Engineering Fair for her energy-and-transportation project. She attends the Ames High School, Ames, Iowa, U.S.A	JPL · 26544
26545 Meganperkins	2000 DK_{39}	Megan Lynn Perkins (born 1994) was awarded first place in the 2010 Intel International Science and Engineering Fair for her energy-and-transportation project. She attends the duPont Manual High School, Louisville, Kentucky, U.S.A	JPL · 26545
26546 Arulmani	2000 DH_{41}	Dheevesh Arulmani (born 1995) was awarded second place in the 2010 Intel International Science and Engineering Fair for his energy-and-transportation project. He attends the Gordon Graydon Memorial Secondary School, Mississauga, Ontario, Canada	JPL · 26546
26548 Joykutty	2000 DF_{56}	Anna Maria Joykutty (born 1993) was awarded second place in the 2010 Intel International Science and Engineering Fair for her energy-and-transportation project. She attends the American Heritage School, Plantation, Florida, U.S.A	JPL · 26548
26549 Tankanran	2000 DZ_{57}	Tan Kan-Ran (born 1992) was awarded second place in the 2010 Intel International Science and Engineering Fair for his energy-and-transportation team project. He attends the Beijing No. 4 High School, Beijing, China	JPL · 26549
26551 Shenliangbo	2000 DS_{73}	Shen Liang-Bo (born 1993) was awarded second place in the 2010 Intel International Science and Engineering Fair for his energy-and-transportation team project. He attends the Beijing No. 4 High School, Beijing, China	JPL · 26551
26557 Aakritijain	2000 DS_{107}	Aakriti Jain (born 1992) was awarded second place in the 2010 Intel International Science and Engineering Fair for her energy-and-transportation team project. She attends the Lynbrook High School, San Jose, California, U.S.A	JPL · 26557
26559 Chengcheng	2000 EX_{29}	Cheng Cheng (born 1992) was awarded second place in the 2010 Intel International Science and Engineering Fair for her energy-and-transportation team project. She attends the Lynbrook High School, San Jose, California, U.S.A	JPL · 26559
26575 Andreapugh	2000 ES_{89}	Andrea Aleah Pugh (born 1994) was awarded second place in the 2010 Intel International Science and Engineering Fair for her environmental-science project. She attends the Saginaw Arts and Sciences Academy, Saginaw, Michigan, U.S.A	JPL · 26575
26578 Cellinekim	2000 EH_{92}	Celline Kim (born 1992) was awarded best of category and first place in the 2010 Intel International Science and Engineering Fair for her environmental-science project. She attends the Manhasset High School, Manhasset, New York, U.S.A	JPL · 26578
26586 Harshaw	2000 EF_{116}	Richard Harshaw (born 1951) is an Arizona amateur astronomer who makes measurements of double stars. He has served in numerous official positions with astronomy clubs	JPL · 26586
26587 Arthurstorbo	2000 EU_{125}	Arthur Storbo (born 1942) is a member of Lowell Observatory's advisory board. Art and his wife Sharon give of their time and talent to help Lowell Observatory fulfill its mission. Art is also a member of the Director's Opportunity Network, seeking to create new opportunities.	IAU · 26587
26588 Sharonstorbo	2000 EX_{128}	Sharon Storbo (born 1948) is a member of Lowell Observatory's advisory board. Sharon and her husband Art give generously of their time and talent helping Lowell Observatory fulfill its mission.	IAU · 26588
26591 Robertreeves	2000 ET_{141}	Robert Reeves (born 1946) is the author of several books on digital astronomical imaging and of numerous popular articles on various topics in astronomy and space science	JPL · 26591
26592 Maryrenfro	2000 EE_{144}	Mary Renfro Reeves (born 1957) is a physical therapist in San Antonio, Texas	JPL · 26592
26593 Perrypat	2000 EC_{145}	Perry Remaklus (born 1939) and Patricia Remaklus (born 1941), the founders, owners, and operators of the Willmann-Bell astronomy book publishing firm and long-time members of the Springfield Telescope Makers.	JPL · 26593

== 26601–26700 ==
back to top

Named minor planet	Provisional	This minor planet was named for...	Ref · Catalog
26604 Ensign	2000 FO_{25}	Thomas Ensign (born 1941) is a long-time member of the Lowell Advisory Board. Tom is a member of the executive committee and the Chair of the Marketing and Public Relations Committee. He supports Lowell's mission and Lowell's science camp for kids.	IAU · 26604
26605 Hanley	2000 FS_{26}	Jennifer Hanley (born 1984) is a tenure-track astronomer at Lowell Observatory. Her research interests involve the stability and spectral properties of ices at low pressures with relevance to the outer solar system, especially Titan and Pluto.	JPL · 26605
26611 Madzlandon	2000 FT_{41}	Madeline Maley Landon (born 1993) was awarded second place in the 2010 Intel International Science and Engineering Fair for her environmental-science project. She attends the Friendswood High School, Friendswood, Texas, U.S.A	JPL · 26611
26612 Sunsetastro	2000 FL_{55}	Founded in 1975, the Sunset Astronomical Society serves the Saginaw-Bay City-Midland tri-cities area of mid-Michigan.	JPL · 26612
26613 Brettwhite	2000 GL_{2}	Brett White, Australian amateur astronomer and telescope maker.	IAU · 26613
26618 Yixinli	2000 GX_{24}	Yixin Li (born 1993) was awarded first place in the 2010 Intel International Science and Engineering Fair for her environmental-science team project. She attends the Ballard High School, Louisville, Kentucky, U.S.A	JPL · 26618
26620 Yihuali	2000 GQ_{45}	Yihua Li (born 1993) was awarded first place in the 2010 Intel International Science and Engineering Fair for her environmental-science team project. She attends the Ballard High School, Louisville, Kentucky, U.S.A	JPL · 26620
26622 Maxwimberley	2000 GH_{75}	Maxim Ilya Wimberley (born 1992) was awarded second place in the 2010 Intel International Science and Engineering Fair for his mathematical-sciences project. He attends the Liberal Arts and Science Academy, Austin, Texas, U.S.A	JPL · 26622
26629 Zahller	2000 GZ_{132}	Cordelia Zahller Luginbuhl (the discoverer's mother), and the Zahller family	JPL · 26629
26634 Balasubramanian	2000 HX_{51}	Anirudha Balasubramanian (born 1992) was awarded second place in the 2010 Intel International Science and Engineering Fair for his mathematical-sciences project. He attends the Saint Albans School, Washington, D.C., U.S.A	JPL · 26634
26636 Ericabroman	2000 HX_{57}	Erica A. Broman (born 1959) is the Trustee Designate for Lowell Observatory and is the great-grandniece of Percival Lowell. Erica is a long-time member of Lowell Observatory's advisory board and the current Vice President for Institutional Advancement of Westfield State University.	IAU · 26636
26639 Murgaš	2000 JB_{7}	Jozef Murgaš (1864–1929), Slovak inventor, architect, botanist, painter, patriot, and Roman Catholic priest	JPL · 26639
26640 Bahýľ	2000 JV_{10}	Ján Bahýľ (1856–1916), Slovak engineer and aeronautical pioneer who was one of the early inventors of the helicopter	JPL · 26640
26642 Schlenoff	2000 JJ_{55}	Philip Samuel Schlenoff (born 1992) was awarded second place in the 2010 Intel International Science and Engineering Fair for his medicine and health-sciences project. He attends the Maclay School, Tallahassee, Florida, U.S.A	JPL · 26642
26647 Brabham	2000 LT	Jack Brabham, Australian mechanical engineer and race-car driver.	IAU · 26647
26652 Klinglesmith	2000 QH_{219}	Daniel A. Klinglesmith III (1939–2019) was an American astrophysicist and photometrist from Indiana University who has devoted himself to both youth science education and asteroid rotation studies at Etscorn Observatory (719) of New Mexico Tech, a site of the asteroid-oriented Summer Science Program (Src, AAS).	JPL · 26652
26653 Amymeyer	2000 RY_{52}	Amy Elizabeth Meyer (born 1992) was awarded second place in the 2010 Intel International Science and Engineering Fair for her medicine and health-sciences project. She attends the Oakville Senior High School, St. Louis, Missouri, U.S.A	JPL · 26653
26654 Ericjohnson	2000 RH_{103}	Eric Johnson (born 1962) is a member of Lowell Observatory's advisory board and is helping Lowell fulfill its mission. Eric serves on Lowell's Technology Committee and donated a 17-inch CDK Telescope to the Giovale Open Deck Observatory for the benefit of the general public.	JPL · 26654
26656 Samarenae	2000 SN_{160}	Samantha Renae Prabakaran (born 1996) was awarded second place in the 2010 Intel International Science and Engineering Fair for her medicine and health-sciences project. She attends the Fort Myers High School, Fort Myers, Florida, U.S.A	JPL · 26656
26659 Skirda	2000 VY_{29}	Olga Y. Skirda (born 1992) was awarded second place in the 2010 Intel International Science and Engineering Fair for her medicine and health-sciences project. She attends the Health Careers High School, San Antonio, Texas, U.S.A	JPL · 26659
26660 Samahalpern	2000 VG_{33}	Samantha Brooke Halpern (born 1993) was awarded second place in the 2010 Intel International Science and Engineering Fair for her medicine and health-sciences project. She attends the Roslyn High School, Roslyn Heights, New York, U.S.A	JPL · 26660
26661 Kempelen	2000 WY_{67}	Wolfgang von Kempelen (1734–1804), Hungarian polymath, mechanic and inventor	JPL · 26661
26664 Jongwon	2000 YB_{7}	Jong Hyuck Won (born 1992) was awarded best of category and first place in the 2010 Intel International Science and Engineering Fair for his medicine and health-sciences project. He attends the Langley High School, McLean, Virginia, U.S.A	JPL · 26664
26665 Sidjena	2000 YF_{60}	Siddhartha Gautama Jena (born 1994) was awarded first place in the 2010 Intel International Science and Engineering Fair for his medicine and health-sciences project. He attends the International Academy, Bloomfield Hills, Michigan, U.S.A	JPL · 26665
26666 Justinto	2000 YN_{97}	Justin To (born 1992) was awarded first place in the 2010 Intel International Science and Engineering Fair for his medicine and health-sciences project. He attends the Oak Grove High School, San Jose, California, U.S.A	JPL · 26666
26667 Sherwinwu	2001 AS_{41}	Sherwin Zhang Wu (born 1992) was awarded second place in the 2010 Intel International Science and Engineering Fair for his medicine and health-sciences project. He attends the Detroit Country Day School, Beverly Hills, Michigan, U.S.A	JPL · 26667
26668 Tonyho	2001 BV_{7}	Tony Ho (born 1992) was awarded second place in the 2010 Intel International Science and Engineering Fair for his medicine and health-sciences team project. He attends the Lynbrook High School, San Jose, California, U.S.A	JPL · 26668
26671 Williamlopes	2001 DQ_{73}	William Lopes (born 1989) was awarded second place in the 2010 Intel International Science and Engineering Fair for his microbiology project. He attends the Fundacao Escola Tecnica Liberato Salzano Vieira da Cunha, Novo Hamburgo, Rio Grande do Sul, Brazil	JPL · 26671
26672 Ericabrooke	2001 DR_{74}	Erica Brooke Portnoy (born 1993) was awarded first place in the 2010 Intel International Science and Engineering Fair for her microbiology project. She attends the Commack High School, Commack, New York, U.S.A	JPL · 26672
26678 Garner	2001 EN_{19}	Robert B. Garner (born 1954) is a member of Lowell Observatory's advisory board. As a member of the Board, Robert helps Lowell Observatory fulfill its mission.	IAU · 26678
26679 Thomassilver	2001 FX_{5}	Thomas Scott Silver (born 1993) was awarded best of category and first place in the 2010 Intel International Science and Engineering Fair for his microbiology project. He attends the Bergen Academy for Medical Science and Technology, Hackensack, New Jersey, U.S.A	JPL · 26679
26680 Wangchristi	2001 FL_{8}	Wang Kun Christina (born 1992) was awarded second place in the 2010 Intel International Science and Engineering Fair for her microbiology project. She attends the Shanghai American School, Shanghai, China	JPL · 26680
26681 Niezgay	2001 FQ_{8}	Augusto German Niez Gay (born 1993) was awarded second place in the 2010 Intel International Science and Engineering Fair for his microbiology project. He attends the Instituto San Jose Adoratrices, Concordia, Entre Rios, Argentina	JPL · 26681
26682 Evanfletcher	2001 FV_{8}	Evan Haley Fletcher (born 1992) was awarded second place in the 2010 Intel International Science and Engineering Fair for his physics-and-astronomy project. He attends the Kalamazoo Area Mathematics and Science Center, Kalamazoo, Michigan, U.S.A	JPL · 26682
26683 Jamesmccarthy	2001 FM_{22}	James P. McCarthy (born 1933) is a founding member of Lowell Observatory's advisory board, who offers his time and talent to Lowell Observatory in honor of late Trustee William "Bill" Putnam. James is a member of the American Alpine Club and is passionate about education and outreach.	IAU · 26683
26685 Khojandi	2001 FK_{44}	Aryan Iden Khojandi (born 1991) was awarded second place in the 2010 Intel International Science and Engineering Fair for his physics-and-astronomy project. He attends the Thomas Jefferson High School for Science and Technology, Alexandria, Virginia, U.S.A	JPL · 26685
26686 Ellenprice	2001 FT_{45}	Ellen Marie Price (born 1992) was awarded second place in the 2010 Intel International Science and Engineering Fair for her physics-and-astronomy project. She attends the Jefferson County International Baccalaureate School, Birmingham, Alabama, U.S.A	JPL · 26686
26688 Wangenevieve	2001 FZ_{54}	Genevieve Ying Wang (born 1992) was awarded second place in the 2010 Intel International Science and Engineering Fair for her physics-and-astronomy team project. She attends the Grosse Pointe South High School, Grosse Pointe Farms, Michigan, U.S.A	JPL · 26688
26689 Smorrison	2001 FD_{56}	Stephen J. Morrison (born 1993) was awarded second place in the 2010 Intel International Science and Engineering Fair for his physics-and-astronomy team project. He attends the Grosse Pointe North High School, Grosse Pointe Woods, Michigan, U.S.A	JPL · 26689
26691 Lareegardner	2001 FZ_{76}	Laree Danielle Gardner (born 1992) was awarded second place in the 2010 Intel International Science and Engineering Fair for her physics-and-astronomy team project. She attends the Grosse Pointe North High School, Grosse Pointe Woods, Michigan, U.S.A	JPL · 26691
26693 Katharinecorbin	2001 FP_{87}	Katharine "Kay" Corbin (born 1943) is a member of Lowell Observatory's advisory board and is the great-grandniece of Percival Lowell. Kay is a member of Lowell's executive committee and Investment Committee. Kay has a science degree from Harvard University.	JPL · 26693
26694 Wenxili	2001 FR_{98}	Wenxi Li (born 1993) was awarded second place in the 2010 Intel International Science and Engineering Fair for her plant-sciences project. She attends the Thomas Chilton Jasper High School, Plano, Texas, U.S.A	JPL · 26694
26696 Gechenzhang	2001 FE_{112}	Gechen Zhang (born 1992) was awarded second place in the 2010 Intel International Science and Engineering Fair for his plant-sciences project. He attends the Rockwood Summit High School, Fenton, Missouri, U.S.A	JPL · 26696
26698 Maryschroeder	2001 FN_{128}	Mary M. Schroeder (born 1940) is a long-time member of Lowell Observatory's advisory board. Mary is a supporter of the LOCKs program, which offers science camps for elementary school children.	IAU · 26698
26699 Masoncole	2001 FZ_{128}	Mason Cole McFarland (born 1992) was awarded best of category and first place in the 2010 Intel International Science and Engineering Fair for his plant-sciences project. He attends the Jefferson County International Baccalaureate School, Birmingham, Alabama, U.S.A	JPL · 26699

== 26701–26800 ==
back to top

Named minor planet	Provisional	This minor planet was named for...	Ref · Catalog
26702 Naber	2001 FK_{143}	Thomas Naber (born 1957) is a member of Lowell Observatory's advisory board. Tom supports Lowell Observatory as a member of Lowell Observatory's Investment Committee.	IAU · 26702
26703 Price	2001 FB_{144}	David R. Price (born 1960) is a member of Lowell Observatory's advisory board who helps Lowell fulfill its mission statement to "maintain quality public education and outreach programs." David supports Lowell Observatory's Native American Astronomy Outreach Program.	JPL · 26703
26707 Navrazhnykh	2001 FP_{155}	Luizetta Vadimovna Navrazhnykh (born 1994) was awarded second place in the 2010 Intel International Science and Engineering Fair for her plant-sciences project. She attends the Florida Atlantic University High School, Boca Raton, Florida, U.S.A	JPL · 26707
26711 Rebekahbau	2001 FQ_{170}	Rebekah Bau (born 1993) was awarded second place in the 2010 Intel International Science and Engineering Fair for her plant-sciences team project. She attends the Cedar Shoals High School, Athens, Georgia, U.S.A	JPL · 26711
26712 Stewart	2001 FV_{180}	Paul C. Stewart (born 1961) is a member of Lowell Observatory's advisory board. As a member of the Board, Paul has given of his time and talent to help Lowell Observatory fulfill its mission. Paul is Director of Technology for Space Dynamics Laboratory.	IAU · 26712
26713 Iusukyin	2001 GR	Iu Suk-yin (born 1932), a passionate school teacher who gave lifetime support to her husband Joseph Liu, the founder of the Hong Kong Space Museum and the "Father of Amateur Astronomy" in Hong Kong.	JPL · 26713
26715 South Dakota	2001 HJ	South Dakota, where the discovery site, the Badlands Observatory, is situated	JPL · 26715
26717 Jasonye	2001 HL_{5}	Jason Ye (born 1993) was awarded second place in the 2010 Intel International Science and Engineering Fair for his plant-sciences team project. He attends the Cedar Shoals High School, Athens, Georgia, U.S.A	JPL · 26717
26720 Yangxinyan	2001 HB_{6}	Yang Xinyan (born 1992) was awarded second place in the 2010 Intel International Science and Engineering Fair for her biochemistry team project. She attends the No. 7 High School of Chengdu City, Chengdu, Sichuan, China	JPL · 26720
26727 Wujunjun	2001 HK_{10}	Wu Junjun (born 1992) was awarded second place in the 2010 Intel International Science and Engineering Fair for his biochemistry team project. He attends the No. 7 High School of Chengdu City, Chengdu, Sichuan, China	JPL · 26727
26728 Luwenqi	2001 HM_{10}	Lu Wenqi (born 1992) was awarded second place in the 2010 Intel International Science and Engineering Fair for her biochemistry team project. She attends the No. 7 High School of Chengdu City, Chengdu, Sichuan, China	JPL · 26728
26732 Damianpeach	2001 HB_{16}	Damian Peach (born 1978) is a British planetary observer and core member of the British Astronomical Association who makes tremendous contributions to planetary imaging and promoted amateur-professional collaboration. His outstanding planetary images have been published in astronomical and scientific publications.	JPL · 26732
26733 Nanavisitor	2001 HC_{16}	Nana Visitor (Nana Tucker), American actress †	MPC · 26733
26734 Terryfarrell	2001 HG_{16}	Terry Farrell (Theresa Lee Farrell), American actress †	MPC · 26734
26736 Rojeski	2001 HM_{27}	Hannah Rojeski (born 1993) was awarded second place in the 2010 Intel International Science and Engineering Fair for her biochemistry team project. She attends the Hilo High School, Hilo, Hawaii, U.S.A	JPL · 26736
26737 Adambradley	2001 HQ_{28}	Adam Bradley Halverson (born 1991) was awarded second place in the 2010 Intel International Science and Engineering Fair for his electrical- and mechanical-engineering project. He attends the Garretson High School, Garretson, South Dakota, U.S.A	JPL · 26737
26738 Lishizhen	2001 HB_{32}	Li Shizhen (1518–1593) was a Chinese herbalist. It took him 28 years to complete his Bencao Gangmu (Compendium of Materia Medica), with details of 1800 drugs	JPL · 26738
26739 Hemaeberhart	2001 HV_{32}	Heather Marie Eberhart (born 1992) was awarded second place in the 2010 Intel International Science and Engineering Fair for her environmental-management project. She attends the Bellarmine Preparatory School, Tacoma, Washington, U.S.A	JPL · 26739
26740 Camacho	2001 HN_{34}	Martin Ayalde Camacho (born 1995) was awarded first place in the 2010 Intel International Science and Engineering Fair for his mathematical-sciences project. He attends the Central High School, Saint Paul, Minnesota, U.S.A	JPL · 26740
26743 Laichinglung	2001 HE_{38}	Lai Ching Lung (born 1948) is a Hong Kong medical physician and a leading liver specialist. He has been a professor of Medicine and Hepatology at the University of Hong Kong since 2003, where he has trained many physicians.	JPL · 26743
26744 Marthahaynes	2001 HF_{43}	Martha P. Haynes (born 1951) is an American astronomer at Cornell University who has used radio, infrared, optical, and ultraviolet observations to probe the formation, evolution and content of galaxies and clusters. She has been a leader in the ALFALFA survey and the forthcoming CCAT-prime wide-field submillimeter telescope.	JPL · 26744
26745 Szeglin	2001 HV_{45}	Arthur R. Szeglin (born 1935) is a long-time member of Lowell Observatory's advisory board.	IAU · 26745
26748 Targovnik	2001 HP_{50}	Selma Targovnik (born 1936) is a long-time member of Lowell Observatory's advisory board. She retired from her dermatology practice where she served helping members of the U.S. military. Selma gives selflessly of her time and talent to Lowell Observatory and to her dance group.	IAU · 26748
26757 Bastei	2001 KU_{17}	The Bastei, a 193 m rock in the middle of the German part of the Elbe Sandstone Mountains, rising above the Elbe river	JPL · 26757
26761 Stromboli	2033 P-L	Stromboli island and volcano	JPL · 26761
26763 Peirithoos	2706 P-L	Peirithoos, mythological friend of Theseus and father of the Greek hero Polypoites	JPL · 26763
26792 Pintado	1975 LY	Olga Inés Pintado, Argentine astronomer.	IAU · 26792
26793 Bolshoi	1977 AC_{2}	Located in the center of Moscow, the Bolshoi Theater of opera and ballet is the largest in Russia and one of the most significant in the world. Its history began in 1776, when the province procurator prince Petr Vasil'evich Urusov received the decree of Catherine II and started building the theater	JPL · 26793
26794 Yukioniimi	1977 DG_{3}	Niimi Yukio (born 1937) analyzed the relation between the coordinate system of the Fourth Fundamental Catalog (FK4) and that of the Planetary Dynamical Theory (DE200, VSOP82) with modern observations of planets. His result obtained from Mars observations was used by Fricke to determine the correction to the FK4 Equinox.	JPL · 26794
26795 Basilashvili	1978 SD_{8}	Oleg Valerianovich Basilashvili (born 1934) has been honored as a People's Artist of the USSR and a state prize laureate of Russia along with many other domestic and foreign prizes, including an Honorable Citizen of St. Petersburg.	JPL · 26795
26800 Gualtierotrucco	1981 EK_{1}	Gualtiero Trucco (born 1953) is a cardiologist specializing in arrhythmology.	JPL · 26800

== 26801–26900 ==
back to top

Named minor planet	Provisional	This minor planet was named for...	Ref · Catalog
26806 Kushiike	1982 KX_{1}	Kushiike was the old village (now part of Joetsu city, Niigata prefecture, Japan) known for the meteorite that fell on 1920 Sept. 16. A public astronomical observatory was built in commemoration of the meteorite and has become a center for education and astronomy outreach in the southern Niigata area.	IAU · 26806
26808 Takeoroumon	1982 VB_{4}	Takeoroumon, Vermillion Tower Gate at the entrance to Takeo Onsen Hot Spring in Saga Prefecture, Japan.	IAU · 26808
26811 Hiesinger	1985 QP	Harald Hiesinger (born 1964), a planetary geologist at the Westfälische Wilhelms-Universität in Münster, Germany.	JPL · 26811
26821 Baehr	1988 FM_{1}	George Baehr (1666–1738) was a famous architect of the German Baroque period. His masterpiece, the Dresden Frauenkirche, is a centrally planned monumental Protestant church provided with a massive stone dome. This city landmark was destroyed in 1945 and is now being rebuilt.	JPL · 26821
26828 Narusawa	1989 WZ_{1}	Shin-ya Narusawa (b. 1965), a Japanese astronomer.	IAU · 26828
26829 Sakaihoikuen	1989 WN_{2}	Kindergarten Sakaihoikuen, Musashino City, Tokyo, Japan	JPL · 26829
26837 Yoshitakaokazaki	1991 RF_{1}	Yoshitaka Okazaki (born 1967) is a teacher at Tosajuku Junior and Senior High School in Kochi city. He enjoys astrophotography as a hobby and is also involved in astronomy education for children as an instructor at Geisei Observatory.	JPL · 26837
26842 Hefele	1991 TK_{6}	Herbert Hefele (born 1942), German astronomer, editor of the Astronomy & Astrophysics Abstracts, and librarian of the Astronomisches Rechen-Institut (ARI). The name was suggested by the first discoverer, Lutz Schmadel.	JPL · 26842
26849 De Paepe	1992 HD_{4}	Hugo de Paepe (born 1940), a doctor of medicine and a specialist in orthopaedic surgery.	JPL · 26849
26851 Sarapul	1992 OV_{5}	Sarapul, Russia, on the Kama river	JPL · 26851
26852 Miyamototakashi	1992 UK_{2}	Takashi Miyamoto (born 1956), director of the Minamiaso Luna Observatory in Kumamoto Prefecture.	JPL · 26852
26855 Yasukohasegawa	1992 WN_{1}	Yasuko Hasegawa (born 1932), founder and president of the first computer training institution in Japan.	JPL · 26855
26857 Veracruz	1993 DN_{1}	Veracruz is a major port on the Gulf of Mexico, founded in 1519 by the Spanish explorer Hernán Cortés. In 1769 French astronomer Chappe d'Auteroche, on his way to San José, suffered great difficulty in reaching the port by boat, due to extremely heavy stormy weather, a phenomenon typical for this region in the Mexican Gulf.	JPL · 26857
26858 Misterrogers	1993 FR	Fred Rogers (1928–2003) was a passionate advocate for children who taught that everyone is unique and deserving of love and respect "just the way you are". For more than 30 years he used his public television program Mister Rogers' Neighborhood as a vehicle of service to the youngest members of the human family.	JPL · 26858
26871 Tanezrouft	1993 TB_{38}	The Tanezrouft Basin, a part of the Sahara Desert, lies just above the Tropic of Cancer, about 750 miles south of Algiers. An especially parched land with annual rainfall less than 0.2 inches, it is hyperarid, with very high temperatures and scarcity of vegetation. There are no permanent residents here, only occasional Tuareg people.	JPL · 26871
26879 Haines	1994 NL_{2}	Peter Wyatt Haines (born 1960), an Australian geologist and discoverer of several impact craters in Australia. He is an associate professor of geology with the University of Tasmania, and has worked in the field of impact geology for a number of years. He discovered the Goyder and Foelsche impact structures in Northern Territory with strong geological, structural and geophysical evidence.	JPL · 26879
26883 Marcelproust	1994 PR_{22}	Marcel Proust (1871–1922) was a French novelist and essayist, widely considered to be one of the most influential author of the 20th century. His monumental novel Á la recherche du temps perdu was published in seven volumes between 1913 and 1927, the last three volumes being edited by his brother, Robert.	IAU · 26883
26886 Takahara	1994 TJ_{2}	Setsuro Takahara (born 1970), Japanese astronomer at the Nishiwaki Earth Science Museum in Nishiwaki, Hyōgo Prefecture.	JPL · 26886
26887 Tokyogiants	1994 TO_{15}	Tokyo Yomiuri Giants baseball team	JPL · 26887
26891 Johnbutler	1995 CC_{2}	Christopher John Butler (born 1940), Irish astronomer who has worked on cool stars, the effects of solar variability on climate, and preserving Armagh Observatory's scientific heritage for future generations. He is well known for his active involvement in the community of Armagh and for discovering an exceptional flare on HD 6090 ("Butler's star").	JPL · 26891
26896 Josefhudec	1995 OY	Josef Hudec (1895–1972), a Czech amateur astronomer who made visual observations and drawings of the solar photosphere and was a keen popularizer of astronomy. He built a public observatory in the town of Kroměříž during the last three years of his life. The name was suggested by J. Koukal.	JPL · 26896
26897 Červená	1995 PJ	Soňa Červená (1925–2023), a Czech opera singer, made her debut in Brno and moved to Berlin in 1958. She performed in prestigious opera houses in Europe, the Americas, finally returning to Prague for theater productions.	JPL · 26897

== 26901–27000 ==
back to top

Named minor planet	Provisional	This minor planet was named for...	Ref · Catalog
26906 Rubidia	1996 BH_{4}	Rubidia Mendez-Harris (born 1945), Guatemalto-American widow of David L. Harris, a member of the discovery team	JPL · 26906
26908 Lebesgue	1996 GK	Henri Lebesgue (1875–1941), French mathematician known for his Lebesgue integration	JPL · 26908
26909 Lefschetz	1996 HY_{1}	Solomon Lefschetz (1884–1972), American mathematician and expert on non-linear differential equations and control theory	JPL · 26909
26917 Pianoro	1996 RF_{4}	Pianoro, Italy, location of Pianoro Observatory (Osservatorio Astronomico di Pianoro)	JPL · 26917
26919 Shoichimiyata	1996 RC_{24}	Shoichi Miyata (born 1948), a member of the Yamagata Astronomical Society.	JPL · 26919
26921 Jensallit	1996 TF_{15}	Jennifer Sallit, wife of British astronomer George C. Sallit who discovered this minor planet	JPL · 26921
26922 Samara	1996 TD_{40}	The Samara, flowing from the foothills of the Urals to join the Volga at the city of Samara	JPL · 26922
26924 Johnharvey	1996 YZ_{2}	John Warren Harvey (born 1940), American heliologist	JPL · 26924
26934 Jordancotler	1997 EV_{33}	Jordan Saul Cotler (born 1994) is a finalist in the 2012 Intel Science Talent Search, a science competition for high-school seniors, for his physics and space-science project.	JPL · 26934
26935 Vireday	1997 EE_{46}	Carol Claire Vireday (born 1957), wife of American astronomer Christian B. Luginbuhl who discovered this minor planet	JPL · 26935
26937 Makimiyamoto	1997 FQ_{1}	Maki Miyamoto (born 1977), Japanese actress	JPL · 26937
26938 Jackli	1997 FW_{3}	Jack Zhihao Li (born 1994) is a finalist in the 2012 Intel Science Talent Search, a science competition for high-school seniors, for his bioengineering project.	JPL · 26938
26939 Jiachengli	1997 FZ_{4}	Jiacheng Li (born 1993) is a finalist in the 2012 Intel Science Talent Search, a science competition for high-school seniors, for his computer-science project.	JPL · 26939
26940 Quintero	1997 GC_{8}	Oliver Adolfo Quintero (born 1993) is a finalist in the 2012 Intel Science Talent Search, a science competition for high-school seniors, for his chemistry project.	JPL · 26940
26942 Nealkuhn	1997 GM_{12}	Neal Kuhn mentored a finalist in the 2012 Intel Science Talent Search, a science competition for high-school seniors.	JPL · 26942
26945 Sushko	1997 GE_{22}	Andrey Sushko (born 1994) is a finalist in the 2012 Intel Science Talent Search, a science competition for high-school seniors, for his engineering project.	JPL · 26945
26946 Ziziyu	1997 GG_{23}	Zizi Yu (born 1994) is a finalist in the 2012 Intel Science Talent Search, a science competition for high-school seniors, for her medicine and health project.	JPL · 26946
26947 Angelawang	1997 GF_{36}	Angela Wang (born 1994) is a finalist in the 2012 Intel Science Talent Search, a science competition for high-school seniors, for her computer-science project.	JPL · 26947
26948 Annasato	1997 GD_{38}	Anna Sato (born 1994) is a finalist in the 2012 Intel Science Talent Search, a science competition for high-school seniors, for her materials-science project. She attends the Ward Melville High School, East Setauket, New York	JPL · 26948
26950 Legendre	1997 JH_{10}	Adrien-Marie Legendre (1752–1833), French mathematician known for the law of quadratic reciprocity and his formula for the distribution of prime numbers	JPL · 26950
26954 Skadiang	1997 MG	Karen Skadiang (born 1962), Australian amateur astronomer and friend of the discoverer Andrea Boattini	JPL · 26954
26955 Lie	1997 MR_{1}	Sophus Lie (1842–1899), Norwegian mathematician known for the Lie group	JPL · 26955
26960 Liouville	1997 NE_{3}	Joseph Liouville (1809–1882), French mathematician who first proved the existence of transcendental numbers. He also founded the Journal de Mathématiques Pures et Appliquées.	JPL · 26960
26963 Palorapavý	1997 PM_{4}	Pavol Rapavý (born 1955), Slovak astronomer and director of the public observatory in Rimavská Sobota	JPL · 26963
26964 Randykamiya	1997 RO	Randall (Randy) Kamiya, mentor and retired American teacher in the Glendale (California) unified school district.	IAU · 26964
26969 Biver	1997 SE	Nicolas Biver (born 1969), French astronomer who observes and models cometary lines at radio wavelengths	JPL · 26969
26970 Eliáš	1997 SE_{2}	Mojmír Eliáš (1932–2002), Czech geologist and planetologist	JPL · 26970
26971 Sezimovo Ústí	1997 SL_{2}	Sezimovo Ústí, a town in southern Bohemia of the Czech Republic	JPL · 26971
26973 Lála	1997 SP_{25}	Petr Lála (1942–2024), Czech astronomer at the Ondřejov Observatory who served at the United Nations Office for Outer Space Affairs	JPL · 26973
26984 Fernand-Roland	1997 VV	Fernand-Roland Merlin (1933–2005), French supporter of amateur astronomers and friend of Christophe Demeautis and Daniel Matter who discovered this minor planet	JPL · 26984
26986 Čáslavská	1997 VC_{5}	Věra Čáslavská (1942–2016), Czech gymnast and Olympic gold medalist, world's best sportswoman of 1968	JPL · 26986
26990 Culbertson	1997 WZ_{7}	Frank Lee Culbertson Jr. (born 1949), former NASA astronaut, recorded the NASA program "Amateur Radio on the ISS" for the first time in Japan on 2001 Nov. 23 in Iruma City.	JPL · 26990
26993 Littlewood	1997 XC_{1}	John Edensor Littlewood (1885–1977), English mathematician whose work included Diophantine approximations, number theory, the Riemann zeta function, inequalities and Fourier series.	JPL · 26993
26998 Iriso	1997 YX_{6}	Iriso, the name of an area in Sayama-city, Saitama, Japan	JPL · 26998

back to top

Preceded by 25,001–26,000	Meanings of minor-planet names List of minor planets: 26,001–27,000	Succeeded by 27,001–28,000
