= Lai Ching Lung =

Hong Kong medical physician (born 1949)

Lai Ching Lung (Chinese: 黎青龍, born 1949) is a Hong Kong medical physician. Lai studied at Diocesan Boys' School, and subsequently in the Li Ka Shing Faculty of Medicine for Bachelor of Medicine and Bachelor of Surgery in 1970. Asteroid 26743 Laichinglung, discovered by Bill Yeung in 2001, was named after him. The official naming citation was published by the Minor Planet Center on 6 April 2019 (M.P.C. 112430).

== Career ==
In 1971, Lai started working in the Department of Medicine, The University of Hong Kong. In 1987, Lai started his research into the treatment of hepatitis B. In 2003, Lai became a Professor of Medicine and Hepatology, University of Hong Kong. In 2011, Lai was appointed to the Simon K Y Lee Professorship in Gastroenterology. Lai is a Professor of Internal Medicine and Hepatology. Despite having retired in 2014, he is still working in the hospital and teaching in the university.

== Personal life ==
Lai's sister is Helen Yu (Chinese: 余黎青萍), a former director of Education Bureau.
