= 26074 Carlwirtz =

Mars-crossing asteroid

Discovery
- Discovered by: H.-E. Schuster
- Discovery site: La Silla Obs.
- Discovery date: 8 October 1977

Designations
- Named after: Carl Wilhelm Wirtz (German astronomer)
- Alternative designations: 1977 TD · 1996 KH
- Minor planet category: Mars-crosser · Hungaria binary

Orbital characteristics
- Epoch 27 April 2019 (JD 2458600.5)
- Uncertainty parameter 0
- Observation arc: 40.83 yr (14,913 d)
- Aphelion: 1.9722 AU
- Perihelion: 1.6499 AU
- Semi-major axis: 1.8110 AU
- Eccentricity: 0.0890
- Orbital period (sidereal): 2.44 yr (890 d)
- Mean anomaly: 198.66°
- Mean motion: 0° 24^{m} 15.84^{s} / day
- Inclination: 31.613°
- Longitude of ascending node: 102.81°
- Argument of perihelion: 73.302°
- Known satellites: 1 (D: n.a. km; P: 16.11 h) (Note: Lightcurve plot of (26074) Carlwirtz Warner (2013), at the Palmer Divide Station (U82). Primary rotation period: 2.5493±0.0003 hours. Secondary rotation period: 16.11±0.02 hours. Quality code is 3. Summary figures at the LCDB and CS3 website.)
- Earth MOID: 0.7534 AU (294 LD)

Physical characteristics
- Mean diameter: 2.54 km (est.); 3.62 km (est.)
- Synodic rotation period: 2.5493±0.0003 h
- Geometric albedo: 0.16 (assumed); 0.30 (assumed)
- Spectral type: E (assumed)
- Absolute magnitude (H): 14.9; 15.0

26074 Carlwirtz (provisional designation 1977 TD) is a dynamical Hungaria asteroid and binary Mars-crosser from the innermost regions of the asteroid belt, approximately 3 kilometers (2 miles) in diameter. It was discovered on 8 October 1977, by German astronomer Hans-Emil Schuster at ESO's La Silla Observatory in northern Chile. The likely binary asteroid on a relatively circular orbit has a short rotation period of 2.5 hours. It was named for German astronomer Carl Wilhelm Wirtz. The system's suspected minor-planet moon of unknown size was first detected in 2013.

== Orbit and classification ==
Carlwirtz is a member of the Mars-crossing asteroids, a dynamically unstable group between the main belt and the near-Earth populations, crossing the orbit of Mars at 1.66 AU. It also belongs to the dynamical Hungaria group, which forms the innermost dense concentration of asteroids in the Solar System. It is, however, not a member of the Hungaria family (003), but a non-family asteroid of the main belt's background population when applying the hierarchical clustering method to its proper orbital elements.

It orbits the Sun in the innermost asteroid belt at a distance of 1.65–1.97 AU once every 2 years and 5 months (890 days; semi-major axis of 1.81 AU). Its orbit has an unusually low eccentricity of 0.09 and an inclination of 32° with respect to the ecliptic. The body's observation arc begins at La Silla Observatory in October 1977, on the night following its official discovery observation.

== Naming ==
This minor planet was named after Carl Wilhelm Wirtz (1875–1939), a German astronomer at Strasbourg and Kiel observatories. In 1924, he revealed statistically the redshift-distance relationship of spiral nebulae. The official naming citation was published by the Minor Planet Center on 28 September 2004 (M.P.C. 52769).

== Physical characteristics ==
Carlwirtz is an assumed E-type asteroid, but may as well be a common S-type asteroid, since the E-type is typical found among members of the Hungaria family rather than among the larger, encompassing dynamical group with the same name.

=== Rotation period ===
In June 2013, a rotational lightcurve of Carlwirtz was obtained from photometric observations by American photometrist Brian Warner at the Palmer Divide Station (U82) in California. Lightcurve analysis gave a well-defined rotation period of 2.5493±0.0003 hours with a brightness amplitude of 0.11±0.01 magnitude (U=3). Follow-up observations by Warner in May 2018 gave a similar period 2.539±0.002 hours (U=2+). (Note: Warner (2018). Lightcurve plot of follow-up observation from May 2018 Quality code is 2+. Summary figures at the LCDB and CS3 website.)

=== Satellite ===
During the observations in June 2013, Warner also noted that Carlwirtz is likely a synchronous binary asteroid with a minor-planet moon in its orbit. While the satellite dimension could not be determined, it has an orbital period of 16.11 hours with an estimated semi-major axis of 6.1 kilometers. However, neither in 2013 nor in the 2018-observations any eclipsing/occultation events could be detected. Instead the asteroid has a classically shaped bimodal lightcurve instead. Since Carlwirtz has a period that is close to two thirds of an Earth-day, single-station observations have difficulties to track a complete lightcurve.

=== Diameter and albedo ===
The Collaborative Asteroid Lightcurve Link assumes an albedo of 0.30 – a compromise value between the S-type (0.20) and E-type (0.40) asteroids – and calculates a diameter of 2.54 kilometers based on an absolute magnitude of 14.9. According to estimates by Johnston's archive, Carlwirtz measures 3.62 kilometers in diameter for an assumed albedo of 0.16.
