= Carl Wilhelm Wirtz =

German astronomer (1876–1939)

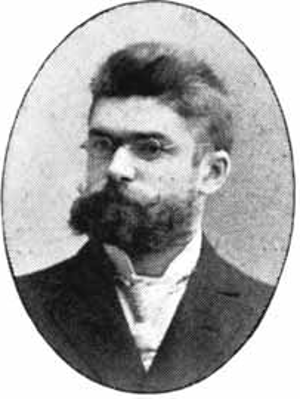
- Carl Wirtz in 1904
- Born: 24 August 1876; Krefeld, Germany
- Died: 18 February 1939 (aged 62); Hamburg, Germany
- Known for: spiral nebulae, redshift
- Scientific career
- Fields: astronomy

Carl Wilhelm Wirtz (24 August 1876 in Krefeld – 18 February 1939 in Hamburg) was an astronomer who studied astronomy at Bonn University (1895-1898) obtaining his doctorate there after which he spent his time between the Kiel Observatory (526) in Germany and Observatory of Strasbourg, France. He is known for statistically showing the existence of a redshift-distance correlation for spiral galaxies.

== Scientific career ==
As already Vesto Slipher in 1912, Wirtz in 1918 observed a systematic redshift of spiral nebulae, which was difficult to interpret in terms of a cosmological model in which the Universe is filled more or less uniformly with stars and nebulae. Wirtz additionally used the equivalent in German of K correction. The term continues to be used in present-day observational cosmology, but Wirtz's observational evidence that the Universe is expanding is not often mentioned. He wrote:

It is remarkable, that our system of fixed stars shall have such a very strong displacement of 820 km/s, and equally strange is the interpretation of the systematic constant k = + 656 km. If we ascribe a verbatim interpretation to this value, then this means that the system of spiral nebulae is drifting apart by a velocity of 656 km with respect to the momentary location of the solar system as the center.

In 1922, he wrote a paper where he argued that the observational results suggest, that the redshifts of distant galaxies are becoming higher than more closer ones, which he interpreted as an increase of their radial velocities with distance, and that larger masses have smaller redshifts than smaller ones. In another note of the same year, he argued that counter-clockwise spiraling galaxies have smaller redshifts than clockwise spiraling ones. In 1924 he obtained more precise results, and interpreted them both as a confirmation of an increase of radial velocities with distance, but also as confirmation of a de Sitter universe, in which the increase of redshift is seen as caused by an increased time dilation in distant parts of the universe.

In 1936, Wirtz wrote a short paper alluding to the priority for his 1922-conclusion that the radial velocities of galaxies are increasing with their distance.

== Honors ==
Mars-crossing asteroid 26074 Carlwirtz and the Martian crater Wirtz were named after him.

== See also ==
- Hubble's law
