= List of minor planets: 4001–5000 =

The following is a partial list of minor planets, running from minor-planet number 4001 through 5000, inclusive. The primary data for this and other partial lists is based on JPL's "Small-Body Orbital Elements" and data available from the Minor Planet Center. Critical list information is also provided by the MPC, unless otherwise specified from Lowell Observatory. A detailed description of the table's columns and additional sources are given on the main page including a complete list of every page in this series, and a statistical break-up on the dynamical classification of minor planets.

Also see the summary list of all named bodies in numerical and alphabetical order, and the corresponding naming citations for the number range of this particular list. New namings may only be added to this list after official publication, as the preannouncement of names is condemned by the Working Group for Small Bodies Nomenclature of the International Astronomical Union.

Near-Earth obj.	MBA (inner)	MBA (outer)	Centaur
Mars-crosser	MBA (middle)	Jupiter trojan	Trans-Neptunian obj.
Unclassified

== 4001–4100 ==
Designation			Discovery			Properties		Ref
Permanent	Provisional	Named after	Date	Site	Discoverer(s)	Category	Diam.	Ref
4001 Ptolemaeus	1949 PV	Ptolemaeus	August 2, 1949	Heidelberg	K. Reinmuth	(1338) (FLO)	4.6 km (2.9 mi)	MPC · JPL
4002 Shinagawa	1950 JB	Shinagawa	May 14, 1950	Heidelberg	K. Reinmuth	slow	10 km (6.2 mi)	MPC · JPL
4003 Schumann	1964 ED	Schumann	March 8, 1964	Tautenburg Observatory	F. Börngen	CYB	36 km (22 mi)	MPC · JPL
4004 Listʹev	1971 SN_{1}	Listʹev	September 16, 1971	Nauchnij	Crimean Astrophysical Observatory	·	25 km (16 mi)	MPC · JPL
4005 Dyagilev	1972 TC_{2}	Dyagilev	October 8, 1972	Nauchnij	L. V. Zhuravleva	·	7.7 km (4.8 mi)	MPC · JPL
4006 Sandler	1972 YR	Sandler	December 29, 1972	Nauchnij	T. M. Smirnova	·	16 km (9.9 mi)	MPC · JPL
4007 Euryalos	1973 SR	Euryalos	September 19, 1973	Palomar	C. J. van Houten, I. van Houten-Groeneveld, T. Gehrels	L4	46 km (29 mi)	MPC · JPL
4008 Corbin	1977 BY	Corbin	January 22, 1977	El Leoncito	Félix Aguilar Observatory	PHO	5.4 km (3.4 mi)	MPC · JPL
4009 Drobyshevskij	1977 EN_{1}	Drobyshevskij	March 13, 1977	Nauchnij	N. S. Chernykh	THM	18 km (11 mi)	MPC · JPL
4010 Nikolʹskij	1977 QJ_{2}	Nikolʹskij	August 21, 1977	Nauchnij	N. S. Chernykh	·	5.4 km (3.4 mi)	MPC · JPL
4011 Bakharev	1978 SC_{6}	Bakharev	September 28, 1978	Nauchnij	N. S. Chernykh	·	3.7 km (2.3 mi)	MPC · JPL
4012 Geballe	1978 VK_{9}	Geballe	November 7, 1978	Palomar	E. F. Helin, S. J. Bus	·	5.8 km (3.6 mi)	MPC · JPL
4013 Ogiria	1979 OM_{15}	Ogiria	July 21, 1979	Nauchnij	N. S. Chernykh	THM ·	16 km (9.9 mi)	MPC · JPL
4014 Heizman	1979 SG_{10}	Heizman	September 28, 1979	Nauchnij	N. S. Chernykh	CYB	37 km (23 mi)	MPC · JPL
4015 Wilson–Harrington	1979 VA	Wilson–Harrington	November 15, 1979	Palomar	E. F. Helin	APO +1 km (0.62 mi) · PHA · Comet (107P)	4.0 km (2.5 mi)	MPC · JPL
4016 Sambre	1979 XK	Sambre	December 15, 1979	La Silla	H. Debehogne, Netto, E. R.	·	8.3 km (5.2 mi)	MPC · JPL
4017 Disneya	1980 DL_{5}	Disneya	February 21, 1980	Nauchnij	L. G. Karachkina	·	9.3 km (5.8 mi)	MPC · JPL
4018 Bratislava	1980 YM	Bratislava	December 30, 1980	Kleť	A. Mrkos	·	12 km (7.5 mi)	MPC · JPL
4019 Klavetter	1981 EK_{14}	Klavetter	March 1, 1981	Siding Spring	S. J. Bus	·	3.4 km (2.1 mi)	MPC · JPL
4020 Dominique	1981 ET_{38}	Dominique	March 1, 1981	Siding Spring	S. J. Bus	·	6.9 km (4.3 mi)	MPC · JPL
4021 Dancey	1981 QD_{2}	Dancey	August 30, 1981	Anderson Mesa	E. Bowell	·	4.5 km (2.8 mi)	MPC · JPL
4022 Nonna	1981 TL_{4}	Nonna	October 8, 1981	Nauchnij	L. I. Chernykh	·	3.7 km (2.3 mi)	MPC · JPL
4023 Jarník	1981 UN	Jarník	October 25, 1981	Kleť	L. Brožek	·	5.6 km (3.5 mi)	MPC · JPL
4024 Ronan	1981 WQ	Ronan	November 24, 1981	Anderson Mesa	E. Bowell	slow	12 km (7.5 mi)	MPC · JPL
4025 Ridley	1981 WU	Ridley	November 24, 1981	Anderson Mesa	E. Bowell	·	4.4 km (2.7 mi)	MPC · JPL
4026 Beet	1982 BU_{1}	Beet	January 30, 1982	Anderson Mesa	E. Bowell	NYS · slow	13 km (8.1 mi)	MPC · JPL
4027 Mitton	1982 DN	Mitton	February 21, 1982	Anderson Mesa	E. Bowell	NYS	8.4 km (5.2 mi)	MPC · JPL
4028 Pancratz	1982 DV_{2}	Pancratz	February 18, 1982	Socorro	Taff, L. G.	(5)	7.3 km (4.5 mi)	MPC · JPL
4029 Bridges	1982 KC_{1}	Bridges	May 24, 1982	Palomar	C. S. Shoemaker, S. J. Bus	moon	7.4 km (4.6 mi)	MPC · JPL
4030 Archenhold	1984 EO_{1}	Archenhold	March 2, 1984	La Silla	H. Debehogne	·	7.0 km (4.3 mi)	MPC · JPL
4031 Mueller	1985 CL	Mueller	February 12, 1985	Palomar	C. S. Shoemaker	H ·	3.9 km (2.4 mi)	MPC · JPL
4032 Chaplygin	1985 UT_{4}	Chaplygin	October 22, 1985	Nauchnij	L. V. Zhuravleva	·	4.5 km (2.8 mi)	MPC · JPL
4033 Yatsugatake	1986 FA	Yatsugatake	March 16, 1986	Kobuchizawa	Inoue, M., O. Muramatsu	·	4.8 km (3.0 mi)	MPC · JPL
4034 Vishnu	1986 PA	Vishnu	August 2, 1986	Palomar	E. F. Helin	APO · PHA	420 m (1,380 ft)	MPC · JPL
4035 Thestor	1986 WD	Thestor	November 22, 1986	Toyota	K. Suzuki, T. Urata	L4	69 km (43 mi)	MPC · JPL
4036 Whitehouse	1987 DW_{5}	Whitehouse	February 21, 1987	La Silla	H. Debehogne	slow	11 km (6.8 mi)	MPC · JPL
4037 Ikeya	1987 EC	Ikeya	March 2, 1987	Toyota	K. Suzuki, T. Urata	·	7.1 km (4.4 mi)	MPC · JPL
4038 Kristina	1987 QH_{2}	Kristina	August 21, 1987	La Silla	E. W. Elst	V	4.3 km (2.7 mi)	MPC · JPL
4039 Souseki	1987 SH	Souseki	September 17, 1987	Geisei	T. Seki	·	6.6 km (4.1 mi)	MPC · JPL
4040 Purcell	1987 SN_{1}	Purcell	September 21, 1987	Anderson Mesa	E. Bowell	·	12 km (7.5 mi)	MPC · JPL
4041 Miyamotoyohko	1988 DN_{1}	Miyamotoyohko	February 19, 1988	Chiyoda	T. Kojima	EOS	26 km (16 mi)	MPC · JPL
4042 Okhotsk	1989 AT_{1}	Okhotsk	January 15, 1989	Kitami	K. Endate, K. Watanabe	NYS ·	8.6 km (5.3 mi)	MPC · JPL
4043 Perolof	1175 T-3	Perolof	October 17, 1977	Palomar	C. J. van Houten, I. van Houten-Groeneveld, T. Gehrels	·	18 km (11 mi)	MPC · JPL
4044 Erikhøg	5142 T-3	Erikhøg	October 16, 1977	Palomar	C. J. van Houten, I. van Houten-Groeneveld, T. Gehrels	EOS	15 km (9.3 mi)	MPC · JPL
4045 Lowengrub	1953 RG	Lowengrub	September 9, 1953	Brooklyn	Indiana University	·	31 km (19 mi)	MPC · JPL
4046 Swain	1953 TV	Swain	October 7, 1953	Brooklyn	Indiana University	·	13 km (8.1 mi)	MPC · JPL
4047 Chang'E	1964 TT_{2}	Chang'E	October 8, 1964	Nanking	Purple Mountain	·	9.6 km (6.0 mi)	MPC · JPL
4048 Samwestfall	1964 UC	Samwestfall	October 30, 1964	Brooklyn	Indiana University	·	3.4 km (2.1 mi)	MPC · JPL
4049 Noragalʹ	1973 QD_{2}	Noragalʹ	August 31, 1973	Nauchnij	T. M. Smirnova	·	19 km (12 mi)	MPC · JPL
4050 Mebailey	1976 SF	Mebailey	September 20, 1976	Kvistaberg	C.-I. Lagerkvist, Rickman, H.	·	17 km (11 mi)	MPC · JPL
4051 Hatanaka	1978 VP	Hatanaka	November 1, 1978	Caussols	K. Tomita	AGN	7.7 km (4.8 mi)	MPC · JPL
4052 Crovisier	1981 DP_{2}	Crovisier	February 28, 1981	Siding Spring	S. J. Bus	EOS	13 km (8.1 mi)	MPC · JPL
4053 Cherkasov	1981 TQ_{1}	Cherkasov	October 2, 1981	Nauchnij	L. V. Zhuravleva	·	7.7 km (4.8 mi)	MPC · JPL
4054 Turnov	1983 TL	Turnov	October 5, 1983	Kleť	A. Mrkos	·	12 km (7.5 mi)	MPC · JPL
4055 Magellan	1985 DO_{2}	Magellan	February 24, 1985	Palomar	E. F. Helin	AMO +1 km (0.62 mi)	2.5 km (1.6 mi)	MPC · JPL
4056 Timwarner	1985 FZ_{1}	Timwarner	March 22, 1985	Anderson Mesa	E. Bowell	EUN	7.6 km (4.7 mi)	MPC · JPL
4057 Demophon	1985 TQ	Demophon	October 15, 1985	Anderson Mesa	E. Bowell	L4	46 km (29 mi)	MPC · JPL
4058 Cecilgreen	1986 JV	Cecilgreen	May 4, 1986	Anderson Mesa	E. Bowell	EOS	15 km (9.3 mi)	MPC · JPL
4059 Balder	1987 SB_{5}	Balder	September 29, 1987	Brorfelde	P. Jensen	EOS ·	17 km (11 mi)	MPC · JPL
4060 Deipylos	1987 YT_{1}	Deipylos	December 17, 1987	La Silla	E. W. Elst, G. Pizarro	L4	84 km (52 mi)	MPC · JPL
4061 Martelli	1988 FF_{3}	Martelli	March 19, 1988	La Silla	W. Ferreri	THM	19 km (12 mi)	MPC · JPL
4062 Schiaparelli	1989 BF	Schiaparelli	January 28, 1989	Bologna	San Vittore	·	5.5 km (3.4 mi)	MPC · JPL
4063 Euforbo	1989 CG_{2}	Euforbo	February 1, 1989	Bologna	San Vittore	L4	96 km (60 mi)	MPC · JPL
4064 Marjorie	2126 P-L	Marjorie	September 24, 1960	Palomar	C. J. van Houten, I. van Houten-Groeneveld, T. Gehrels	·	6.0 km (3.7 mi)	MPC · JPL
4065 Meinel	2820 P-L	Meinel	September 24, 1960	Palomar	C. J. van Houten, I. van Houten-Groeneveld, T. Gehrels	·	3.9 km (2.4 mi)	MPC · JPL
4066 Haapavesi	1940 RG	Haapavesi	September 7, 1940	Turku	H. Alikoski	slow	4.1 km (2.5 mi)	MPC · JPL
4067 Mikhelʹson	1966 TP	Mikhelʹson	October 11, 1966	Nauchnij	N. S. Chernykh	·	7.4 km (4.6 mi)	MPC · JPL
4068 Menestheus	1973 SW	Menestheus	September 19, 1973	Palomar	C. J. van Houten, I. van Houten-Groeneveld, T. Gehrels	L4	68 km (42 mi)	MPC · JPL
4069 Blakee	1978 VL_{7}	Blakee	November 7, 1978	Palomar	E. F. Helin, S. J. Bus	·	4.0 km (2.5 mi)	MPC · JPL
4070 Rozov	1980 RS_{2}	Rozov	September 8, 1980	Nauchnij	L. V. Zhuravleva	·	5.2 km (3.2 mi)	MPC · JPL
4071 Rostovdon	1981 RD_{2}	Rostovdon	September 7, 1981	Nauchnij	L. G. Karachkina	slow	26 km (16 mi)	MPC · JPL
4072 Yayoi	1981 UJ_{4}	Yayoi	October 30, 1981	Kiso	H. Kosai, K. Furukawa	·	4.7 km (2.9 mi)	MPC · JPL
4073 Ruianzhongxue	1981 UE_{10}	Ruianzhongxue	October 23, 1981	Nanking	Purple Mountain	THM	13 km (8.1 mi)	MPC · JPL
4074 Sharkov	1981 UN_{11}	Sharkov	October 22, 1981	Nauchnij	N. S. Chernykh	EOS	12 km (7.5 mi)	MPC · JPL
4075 Sviridov	1982 TL_{1}	Sviridov	October 14, 1982	Nauchnij	L. G. Karachkina	·	10 km (6.2 mi)	MPC · JPL
4076 Dörffel	1982 UF_{4}	Dörffel	October 19, 1982	Tautenburg Observatory	F. Börngen	KOR	9.0 km (5.6 mi)	MPC · JPL
4077 Asuka	1982 XV_{1}	Asuka	December 13, 1982	Kiso	H. Kosai, K. Furukawa	EOS	19 km (12 mi)	MPC · JPL
4078 Polakis	1983 AC	Polakis	January 9, 1983	Anderson Mesa	B. A. Skiff	EOS	20 km (12 mi)	MPC · JPL
4079 Britten	1983 CS	Britten	February 15, 1983	Anderson Mesa	E. Bowell	THM	16 km (9.9 mi)	MPC · JPL
4080 Galinskij	1983 PW	Galinskij	August 4, 1983	Nauchnij	L. G. Karachkina	·	5.8 km (3.6 mi)	MPC · JPL
4081 Tippett	1983 RC_{2}	Tippett	September 14, 1983	Anderson Mesa	E. Bowell	·	7.6 km (4.7 mi)	MPC · JPL
4082 Swann	1984 SW_{3}	Swann	September 27, 1984	Palomar	C. S. Shoemaker	·	9.5 km (5.9 mi)	MPC · JPL
4083 Jody	1985 CV	Jody	February 12, 1985	Palomar	C. S. Shoemaker	·	9.6 km (6.0 mi)	MPC · JPL
4084 Hollis	1985 GM	Hollis	April 14, 1985	Anderson Mesa	E. Bowell	KOR	10 km (6.2 mi)	MPC · JPL
4085 Weir	1985 JR	Weir	May 13, 1985	Palomar	C. S. Shoemaker	EUN	9.2 km (5.7 mi)	MPC · JPL
4086 Podalirius	1985 VK_{2}	Podalirius	November 9, 1985	Nauchnij	L. V. Zhuravleva	L4	85 km (53 mi)	MPC · JPL
4087 Pärt	1986 EM_{1}	Pärt	March 5, 1986	Anderson Mesa	E. Bowell	·	6.4 km (4.0 mi)	MPC · JPL
4088 Baggesen	1986 GG	Baggesen	April 3, 1986	Brorfelde	P. Jensen	·	6.5 km (4.0 mi)	MPC · JPL
4089 Galbraith	1986 JG	Galbraith	May 2, 1986	Palomar	Palomar	·	5.1 km (3.2 mi)	MPC · JPL
4090 Říšehvězd	1986 RH_{1}	Říšehvězd	September 2, 1986	Kleť	A. Mrkos	NYS	7.2 km (4.5 mi)	MPC · JPL
4091 Lowe	1986 TL_{2}	Lowe	October 7, 1986	Anderson Mesa	E. Bowell	·	23 km (14 mi)	MPC · JPL
4092 Tyr	1986 TJ_{4}	Tyr	October 8, 1986	Brorfelde	P. Jensen	moon	9.5 km (5.9 mi)	MPC · JPL
4093 Bennett	1986 VD	Bennett	November 4, 1986	Siding Spring	R. H. McNaught	EOS	25 km (16 mi)	MPC · JPL
4094 Aoshima	1987 QC	Aoshima	August 26, 1987	Shizuoka	M. Kizawa, Kakei, W.	·	13 km (8.1 mi)	MPC · JPL
4095 Ishizuchisan	1987 SG	Ishizuchisan	September 16, 1987	Geisei	T. Seki	·	4.8 km (3.0 mi)	MPC · JPL
4096 Kushiro	1987 VC	Kushiro	November 15, 1987	Kushiro	S. Ueda, H. Kaneda	GEF	7.7 km (4.8 mi)	MPC · JPL
4097 Tsurugisan	1987 WW	Tsurugisan	November 18, 1987	Geisei	T. Seki	·	4.7 km (2.9 mi)	MPC · JPL
4098 Thraen	1987 WQ_{1}	Thraen	November 26, 1987	Tautenburg Observatory	F. Börngen	THM	14 km (8.7 mi)	MPC · JPL
4099 Wiggins	1988 AB_{5}	Wiggins	January 13, 1988	La Silla	H. Debehogne	MAR	7.5 km (4.7 mi)	MPC · JPL
4100 Sumiko	1988 BF	Sumiko	January 16, 1988	Okutama	Hioki, T., N. Kawasato	EOS	16 km (9.9 mi)	MPC · JPL

== 4101–4200 ==
back to top

Designation			Discovery			Properties		Ref
Permanent	Provisional	Named after	Date	Site	Discoverer(s)	Category	Diam.	Ref
4101 Ruikou	1988 CE	Ruikou	February 8, 1988	Geisei	T. Seki	·	8.2 km (5.1 mi)	MPC · JPL
4102 Gergana	1988 TE_{3}	Gergana	October 15, 1988	Smolyan	V. G. Ivanova	EOS	12 km (7.5 mi)	MPC · JPL
4103 Chahine	1989 EB	Chahine	March 4, 1989	Palomar	E. F. Helin	PHO · slow	16 km (9.9 mi)	MPC · JPL
4104 Alu	1989 ED	Alu	March 5, 1989	Palomar	E. F. Helin	MAR	8.6 km (5.3 mi)	MPC · JPL
4105 Tsia	1989 EK	Tsia	March 5, 1989	Palomar	E. F. Helin	·	13 km (8.1 mi)	MPC · JPL
4106 Nada	1989 EW	Nada	March 6, 1989	Minami-Oda	T. Nomura, K. Kawanishi	·	20 km (12 mi)	MPC · JPL
4107 Rufino	1989 GT	Rufino	April 7, 1989	Palomar	E. F. Helin	·	13 km (8.1 mi)	MPC · JPL
4108 Rakos	3439 T-3	Rakos	October 16, 1977	Palomar	C. J. van Houten, I. van Houten-Groeneveld, T. Gehrels	·	10 km (6.2 mi)	MPC · JPL
4109 Anokhin	1969 OW	Anokhin	July 17, 1969	Nauchnij	B. A. Burnasheva	·	4.8 km (3.0 mi)	MPC · JPL
4110 Keats	1977 CZ	Keats	February 13, 1977	Palomar	E. Bowell	·	23 km (14 mi)	MPC · JPL
4111 Lamy	1981 EN_{12}	Lamy	March 1, 1981	Siding Spring	S. J. Bus	·	3.2 km (2.0 mi)	MPC · JPL
4112 Hrabal	1981 ST	Hrabal	September 25, 1981	Kleť	Mahrová, M.	·	46 km (29 mi)	MPC · JPL
4113 Rascana	1982 BQ	Rascana	January 18, 1982	Anderson Mesa	E. Bowell	BAP	7.3 km (4.5 mi)	MPC · JPL
4114 Jasnorzewska	1982 QB_{1}	Jasnorzewska	August 19, 1982	Kleť	Z. Vávrová	·	5.5 km (3.4 mi)	MPC · JPL
4115 Peternorton	1982 QS_{3}	Peternorton	August 29, 1982	Nauchnij	N. S. Chernykh	EOS	14 km (8.7 mi)	MPC · JPL
4116 Elachi	1982 SU	Elachi	September 20, 1982	Palomar	E. F. Helin	H	4.7 km (2.9 mi)	MPC · JPL
4117 Wilke	1982 SU_{3}	Wilke	September 24, 1982	Tautenburg Observatory	F. Börngen	·	6.5 km (4.0 mi)	MPC · JPL
4118 Sveta	1982 TH_{3}	Sveta	October 15, 1982	Nauchnij	L. V. Zhuravleva	EOS	13 km (8.1 mi)	MPC · JPL
4119 Miles	1983 BE	Miles	January 16, 1983	Anderson Mesa	E. Bowell	fast	13 km (8.1 mi)	MPC · JPL
4120 Denoyelle	1985 RS_{4}	Denoyelle	September 14, 1985	La Silla	H. Debehogne	·	15 km (9.3 mi)	MPC · JPL
4121 Carlin	1986 JH	Carlin	May 2, 1986	Palomar	INAS	PHO	6.9 km (4.3 mi)	MPC · JPL
4122 Ferrari	1986 OA	Ferrari	July 28, 1986	Bologna	San Vittore	·	8.9 km (5.5 mi)	MPC · JPL
4123 Tarsila	1986 QP_{1}	Tarsila	August 27, 1986	La Silla	H. Debehogne	KOR	6.5 km (4.0 mi)	MPC · JPL
4124 Herriot	1986 SE	Herriot	September 29, 1986	Kleť	Z. Vávrová	HOF	19 km (12 mi)	MPC · JPL
4125 Lew Allen	1987 MO	Lew Allen	June 28, 1987	Palomar	E. F. Helin	H	6.4 km (4.0 mi)	MPC · JPL
4126 Mashu	1988 BU	Mashu	January 19, 1988	Kitami	K. Endate, K. Watanabe	THM	20 km (12 mi)	MPC · JPL
4127 Kyogoku	1988 BA_{2}	Kyogoku	January 25, 1988	Kushiro	S. Ueda, H. Kaneda	·	8.5 km (5.3 mi)	MPC · JPL
4128 UKSTU	1988 BM_{5}	UKSTU	January 28, 1988	Siding Spring	R. H. McNaught	EUN	4.5 km (2.8 mi)	MPC · JPL
4129 Richelen	1988 DM	Richelen	February 22, 1988	Siding Spring	R. H. McNaught	·	5.4 km (3.4 mi)	MPC · JPL
4130 Ramanujan	1988 DQ_{1}	Ramanujan	February 17, 1988	Kavalur	Rajamohan, R.	EOS	13 km (8.1 mi)	MPC · JPL
4131 Stasik	1988 DR_{4}	Stasik	February 23, 1988	Siding Spring	Noymer, A. J.	·	29 km (18 mi)	MPC · JPL
4132 Bartók	1988 EH	Bartók	March 12, 1988	Palomar	J. Alu	·	9.7 km (6.0 mi)	MPC · JPL
4133 Heureka	1942 DB	Heureka	February 17, 1942	Turku	L. Oterma	EUN	9.4 km (5.8 mi)	MPC · JPL
4134 Schütz	1961 CR	Schütz	February 15, 1961	Tautenburg Observatory	F. Börngen	·	4.1 km (2.5 mi)	MPC · JPL
4135 Svetlanov	1966 PG	Svetlanov	August 14, 1966	Nauchnij	L. I. Chernykh, T. M. Smirnova	DOR	24 km (15 mi)	MPC · JPL
4136 Artmane	1968 FJ	Artmane	March 28, 1968	Nauchnij	T. M. Smirnova	·	11 km (6.8 mi)	MPC · JPL
4137 Crabtree	1970 WC	Crabtree	November 24, 1970	Hamburg-Bergedorf	L. Kohoutek	·	6.5 km (4.0 mi)	MPC · JPL
4138 Kalchas	1973 SM	Kalchas	September 19, 1973	Palomar	C. J. van Houten, I. van Houten-Groeneveld, T. Gehrels	L4	46 km (29 mi)	MPC · JPL
4139 Ulʹyanin	1975 VE_{2}	Ulʹyanin	November 2, 1975	Nauchnij	T. M. Smirnova	THM	13 km (8.1 mi)	MPC · JPL
4140 Branham	1976 VA	Branham	November 11, 1976	El Leoncito	Félix Aguilar Observatory	·	34 km (21 mi)	MPC · JPL
4141 Nintanlena	1978 PG_{3}	Nintanlena	August 8, 1978	Nauchnij	N. S. Chernykh	·	15 km (9.3 mi)	MPC · JPL
4142 Dersu-Uzala	1981 KE	Dersu-Uzala	May 28, 1981	Kleť	Z. Vávrová	H · slow	6.0 km (3.7 mi)	MPC · JPL
4143 Huziak	1981 QN_{1}	Huziak	August 29, 1981	Socorro	Taff, L. G.	THM	17 km (11 mi)	MPC · JPL
4144 Vladvasilʹev	1981 SW_{6}	Vladvasilʹev	September 28, 1981	Nauchnij	L. V. Zhuravleva	·	32 km (20 mi)	MPC · JPL
4145 Maximova	1981 SJ_{7}	Maximova	September 29, 1981	Nauchnij	L. V. Zhuravleva	·	5.3 km (3.3 mi)	MPC · JPL
4146 Rudolfinum	1982 DD_{2}	Rudolfinum	February 16, 1982	Kleť	L. Brožek	·	4.8 km (3.0 mi)	MPC · JPL
4147 Lennon	1983 AY	Lennon	January 12, 1983	Anderson Mesa	B. A. Skiff	V · slow?	5.2 km (3.2 mi)	MPC · JPL
4148 McCartney	1983 NT	McCartney	July 11, 1983	Anderson Mesa	E. Bowell	·	7.3 km (4.5 mi)	MPC · JPL
4149 Harrison	1984 EZ	Harrison	March 9, 1984	Anderson Mesa	B. A. Skiff	EUN ·	10 km (6.2 mi)	MPC · JPL
4150 Starr	1984 QC_{1}	Starr	August 31, 1984	Anderson Mesa	B. A. Skiff	·	6.6 km (4.1 mi)	MPC · JPL
4151 Alanhale	1985 HV_{1}	Alanhale	April 24, 1985	Palomar	C. S. Shoemaker, E. M. Shoemaker	THM	20 km (12 mi)	MPC · JPL
4152 Weber	1985 JF	Weber	May 15, 1985	Anderson Mesa	E. Bowell	·	20 km (12 mi)	MPC · JPL
4153 Roburnham	1985 JT_{1}	Roburnham	May 14, 1985	Palomar	C. S. Shoemaker	THM	17 km (11 mi)	MPC · JPL
4154 Rumsey	1985 NE	Rumsey	July 10, 1985	Lake Tekapo	A. C. Gilmore, P. M. Kilmartin	·	6.2 km (3.9 mi)	MPC · JPL
4155 Watanabe	1987 UB_{1}	Watanabe	October 25, 1987	Kushiro	S. Ueda, H. Kaneda	·	6.0 km (3.7 mi)	MPC · JPL
4156 Okadanoboru	1988 BE	Okadanoboru	January 16, 1988	Chiyoda	T. Kojima	·	15 km (9.3 mi)	MPC · JPL
4157 Izu	1988 XD_{2}	Izu	December 11, 1988	Gekko	Y. Oshima	ADE	21 km (13 mi)	MPC · JPL
4158 Santini	1989 BE	Santini	January 28, 1989	Bologna	San Vittore	CYB · slow	17 km (11 mi)	MPC · JPL
4159 Freeman	1989 GK	Freeman	April 5, 1989	Palomar	E. F. Helin	·	17 km (11 mi)	MPC · JPL
4160 Sabrina-John	1989 LE	Sabrina-John	June 3, 1989	Palomar	E. F. Helin	·	10 km (6.2 mi)	MPC · JPL
4161 Amasis	6627 P-L	Amasis	September 24, 1960	Palomar	C. J. van Houten, I. van Houten-Groeneveld, T. Gehrels	·	16 km (9.9 mi)	MPC · JPL
4162 SAF	1940 WA	SAF	November 24, 1940	Nice	A. Patry	·	25 km (16 mi)	MPC · JPL
4163 Saaremaa	1941 HC	Saaremaa	April 19, 1941	Turku	L. Oterma	EOS	20 km (12 mi)	MPC · JPL
4164 Shilov	1969 UR	Shilov	October 16, 1969	Nauchnij	L. I. Chernykh	EUN	10 km (6.2 mi)	MPC · JPL
4165 Didkovskij	1976 GS_{3}	Didkovskij	April 1, 1976	Nauchnij	N. S. Chernykh	·	8.0 km (5.0 mi)	MPC · JPL
4166 Pontryagin	1978 SZ_{6}	Pontryagin	September 26, 1978	Nauchnij	L. V. Zhuravleva	·	8.0 km (5.0 mi)	MPC · JPL
4167 Riemann	1978 TQ_{7}	Riemann	October 2, 1978	Nauchnij	L. V. Zhuravleva	MAR	13 km (8.1 mi)	MPC · JPL
4168 Millan	1979 EE	Millan	March 6, 1979	El Leoncito	Félix Aguilar Observatory	·	6.9 km (4.3 mi)	MPC · JPL
4169 Celsius	1980 FO_{3}	Celsius	March 16, 1980	La Silla	C.-I. Lagerkvist	CYB	37 km (23 mi)	MPC · JPL
4170 Semmelweis	1980 PT	Semmelweis	August 6, 1980	Kleť	Z. Vávrová	EOS	17 km (11 mi)	MPC · JPL
4171 Carrasco	1982 FZ_{1}	Carrasco	March 23, 1982	Palomar	C. S. Shoemaker	·	4.9 km (3.0 mi)	MPC · JPL
4172 Rochefort	1982 FC_{3}	Rochefort	March 20, 1982	La Silla	H. Debehogne	·	3.4 km (2.1 mi)	MPC · JPL
4173 Thicksten	1982 KG_{1}	Thicksten	May 27, 1982	Palomar	C. S. Shoemaker	·	12 km (7.5 mi)	MPC · JPL
4174 Pikulia	1982 SB_{6}	Pikulia	September 16, 1982	Nauchnij	L. I. Chernykh	THM	22 km (14 mi)	MPC · JPL
4175 Billbaum	1985 GX	Billbaum	April 15, 1985	Anderson Mesa	E. Bowell	·	8.9 km (5.5 mi)	MPC · JPL
4176 Sudek	1987 DS	Sudek	February 24, 1987	Kleť	A. Mrkos	THM	19 km (12 mi)	MPC · JPL
4177 Kohman	1987 SS_{1}	Kohman	September 21, 1987	Anderson Mesa	E. Bowell	CYB · 2:1J	11 km (6.8 mi)	MPC · JPL
4178 Mimeev	1988 EO_{1}	Mimeev	March 13, 1988	Palomar	E. F. Helin	(3460)	16 km (9.9 mi)	MPC · JPL
4179 Toutatis	1989 AC	Toutatis	January 4, 1989	Caussols	C. Pollas	APO +1 km (0.62 mi) · (887) · PHA · slow	5.4 km (3.4 mi)	MPC · JPL
4180 Anaxagoras	6092 P-L	Anaxagoras	September 24, 1960	Palomar	C. J. van Houten, I. van Houten-Groeneveld, T. Gehrels	·	9.7 km (6.0 mi)	MPC · JPL
4181 Kivi	1938 DK_{1}	Kivi	February 24, 1938	Turku	Y. Väisälä	slow	8.3 km (5.2 mi)	MPC · JPL
4182 Mount Locke	1951 JQ	Mount Locke	May 2, 1951	Fort Davis	McDonald Observatory	GEF	10 km (6.2 mi)	MPC · JPL
4183 Cuno	1959 LM	Cuno	June 5, 1959	Bloemfontein	C. Hoffmeister	APO +1 km (0.62 mi) · PHA	3.7 km (2.3 mi)	MPC · JPL
4184 Berdyayev	1969 TJ_{1}	Berdyayev	October 8, 1969	Nauchnij	L. I. Chernykh	·	7.6 km (4.7 mi)	MPC · JPL
4185 Phystech	1975 ED	Phystech	March 4, 1975	Nauchnij	T. M. Smirnova	·	6.1 km (3.8 mi)	MPC · JPL
4186 Tamashima	1977 DT_{1}	Tamashima	February 18, 1977	Kiso	H. Kosai, K. Furukawa	·	30 km (19 mi)	MPC · JPL
4187 Shulnazaria	1978 GR_{3}	Shulnazaria	April 11, 1978	Nauchnij	N. S. Chernykh	·	14 km (8.7 mi)	MPC · JPL
4188 Kitezh	1979 HX_{4}	Kitezh	April 25, 1979	Nauchnij	N. S. Chernykh	·	6.6 km (4.1 mi)	MPC · JPL
4189 Sayany	1979 SV_{9}	Sayany	September 22, 1979	Nauchnij	N. S. Chernykh	·	3.9 km (2.4 mi)	MPC · JPL
4190 Kvasnica	1980 JH	Kvasnica	May 11, 1980	Kleť	L. Brožek	EUN	7.4 km (4.6 mi)	MPC · JPL
4191 Assesse	1980 KH	Assesse	May 22, 1980	La Silla	H. Debehogne	EUN	7.4 km (4.6 mi)	MPC · JPL
4192 Breysacher	1981 DH	Breysacher	February 28, 1981	La Silla	H. Debehogne, G. de Sanctis	THM	21 km (13 mi)	MPC · JPL
4193 Salanave	1981 SM_{1}	Salanave	September 26, 1981	Anderson Mesa	B. A. Skiff, N. G. Thomas	THM	18 km (11 mi)	MPC · JPL
4194 Sweitzer	1982 RE	Sweitzer	September 15, 1982	Anderson Mesa	E. Bowell	·	17 km (11 mi)	MPC · JPL
4195 Esambaev	1982 SK_{8}	Esambaev	September 19, 1982	Nauchnij	L. I. Chernykh	KOR	9.7 km (6.0 mi)	MPC · JPL
4196 Shuya	1982 SA_{13}	Shuya	September 16, 1982	Nauchnij	L. I. Chernykh	3:2	37 km (23 mi)	MPC · JPL
4197 Morpheus	1982 TA	Morpheus	October 11, 1982	Palomar	E. F. Helin, E. M. Shoemaker	APO +1 km (0.62 mi)	1.8 km (1.1 mi)	MPC · JPL
4198 Panthera	1983 CK_{1}	Panthera	February 11, 1983	Anderson Mesa	N. G. Thomas	THM	12 km (7.5 mi)	MPC · JPL
4199 Andreev	1983 RX_{2}	Andreev	September 1, 1983	La Silla	H. Debehogne	·	5.6 km (3.5 mi)	MPC · JPL
4200 Shizukagozen	1983 WA	Shizukagozen	November 28, 1983	Karasuyama	Y. Banno, T. Urata	·	8.0 km (5.0 mi)	MPC · JPL

== 4201–4300 ==
back to top

Designation			Discovery			Properties		Ref
Permanent	Provisional	Named after	Date	Site	Discoverer(s)	Category	Diam.	Ref
4201 Orosz	1984 JA_{1}	Orosz	May 3, 1984	Anderson Mesa	B. A. Skiff	·	33 km (21 mi)	MPC · JPL
4202 Minitti	1985 CB_{2}	Minitti	February 12, 1985	La Silla	H. Debehogne	EOS	10 km (6.2 mi)	MPC · JPL
4203 Brucato	1985 FD_{3}	Brucato	March 26, 1985	Palomar	C. S. Shoemaker	BRU	18 km (11 mi)	MPC · JPL
4204 Barsig	1985 JG_{1}	Barsig	May 11, 1985	Palomar	C. S. Shoemaker	·	5.8 km (3.6 mi)	MPC · JPL
4205 David Hughes	1985 YP	David Hughes	December 18, 1985	Anderson Mesa	E. Bowell	·	3.6 km (2.2 mi)	MPC · JPL
4206 Verulamium	1986 QL	Verulamium	August 25, 1986	La Silla	H. Debehogne	KOR	8.5 km (5.3 mi)	MPC · JPL
4207 Chernova	1986 RO_{2}	Chernova	September 5, 1986	Anderson Mesa	E. Bowell	EOS	13 km (8.1 mi)	MPC · JPL
4208 Kiselev	1986 RQ_{2}	Kiselev	September 6, 1986	Anderson Mesa	E. Bowell	·	30 km (19 mi)	MPC · JPL
4209 Briggs	1986 TG_{4}	Briggs	October 4, 1986	Palomar	E. F. Helin	·	31 km (19 mi)	MPC · JPL
4210 Isobelthompson	1987 DY_{5}	Isobelthompson	February 21, 1987	La Silla	H. Debehogne	EOS	10 km (6.2 mi)	MPC · JPL
4211 Rosniblett	1987 RT	Rosniblett	September 12, 1987	La Silla	H. Debehogne	THM	25 km (16 mi)	MPC · JPL
4212 Sansyu-Asuke	1987 SB_{2}	Sansyu-Asuke	September 28, 1987	Toyota	K. Suzuki, T. Urata	·	17 km (11 mi)	MPC · JPL
4213 Njord	1987 ST_{4}	Njord	September 25, 1987	Brorfelde	P. Jensen	·	5.9 km (3.7 mi)	MPC · JPL
4214 Veralynn	1987 UX_{4}	Veralynn	October 22, 1987	Nauchnij	L. V. Zhuravleva	·	8.2 km (5.1 mi)	MPC · JPL
4215 Kamo	1987 VE_{1}	Kamo	November 14, 1987	Kushiro	S. Ueda, H. Kaneda	·	6.6 km (4.1 mi)	MPC · JPL
4216 Neunkirchen	1988 AF_{5}	Neunkirchen	January 14, 1988	La Silla	H. Debehogne	·	2.4 km (1.5 mi)	MPC · JPL
4217 Engelhardt	1988 BO_{2}	Engelhardt	January 24, 1988	Palomar	C. S. Shoemaker	PHO	8.7 km (5.4 mi)	MPC · JPL
4218 Demottoni	1988 BK_{3}	Demottoni	January 16, 1988	La Silla	H. Debehogne	·	4.2 km (2.6 mi)	MPC · JPL
4219 Nakamura	1988 DB	Nakamura	February 19, 1988	Kobuchizawa	Inoue, M., O. Muramatsu	NYS · slow	10 km (6.2 mi)	MPC · JPL
4220 Flood	1988 DN	Flood	February 22, 1988	Siding Spring	R. H. McNaught	DOR	11 km (6.8 mi)	MPC · JPL
4221 Picasso	1988 EJ	Picasso	March 13, 1988	Palomar	J. Alu	·	11 km (6.8 mi)	MPC · JPL
4222 Nancita	1988 EK_{1}	Nancita	March 13, 1988	Palomar	E. F. Helin	·	9.6 km (6.0 mi)	MPC · JPL
4223 Shikoku	1988 JM	Shikoku	May 7, 1988	Geisei	T. Seki	EOS	23 km (14 mi)	MPC · JPL
4224 Susa	1988 KG	Susa	May 19, 1988	Palomar	E. F. Helin	·	35 km (22 mi)	MPC · JPL
4225 Hobart	1989 BN	Hobart	January 31, 1989	Okutama	Hioki, T., N. Kawasato	·	6.4 km (4.0 mi)	MPC · JPL
4226 Damiaan	1989 RE	Damiaan	September 1, 1989	Haute-Provence	E. W. Elst	·	33 km (21 mi)	MPC · JPL
4227 Kaali	1942 DC	Kaali	February 17, 1942	Turku	L. Oterma	NYS	8.3 km (5.2 mi)	MPC · JPL
4228 Nemiro	1968 OC_{1}	Nemiro	July 25, 1968	Cerro El Roble	Plyugin, G. A., Yu. A. Belyaev	·	3.5 km (2.2 mi)	MPC · JPL
4229 Plevitskaya	1971 BK	Plevitskaya	January 22, 1971	Nauchnij	L. I. Chernykh	·	8.7 km (5.4 mi)	MPC · JPL
4230 van den Bergh	1973 ST_{1}	van den Bergh	September 19, 1973	Palomar	C. J. van Houten, I. van Houten-Groeneveld, T. Gehrels	3:2 · SHU	28 km (17 mi)	MPC · JPL
4231 Fireman	1976 WD	Fireman	November 20, 1976	Harvard Observatory	Harvard Observatory	slow	13 km (8.1 mi)	MPC · JPL
4232 Aparicio	1977 CD	Aparicio	February 13, 1977	El Leoncito	Félix Aguilar Observatory	H ·	3.3 km (2.1 mi)	MPC · JPL
4233 Palʹchikov	1977 RO_{7}	Palʹchikov	September 11, 1977	Nauchnij	N. S. Chernykh	·	7.4 km (4.6 mi)	MPC · JPL
4234 Evtushenko	1978 JT_{1}	Evtushenko	May 6, 1978	Nauchnij	N. S. Chernykh	THM	16 km (9.9 mi)	MPC · JPL
4235 Tatishchev	1978 SL_{5}	Tatishchev	September 27, 1978	Nauchnij	L. I. Chernykh	·	10 km (6.2 mi)	MPC · JPL
4236 Lidov	1979 FV_{1}	Lidov	March 23, 1979	Nauchnij	N. S. Chernykh	CYB · slow	33 km (21 mi)	MPC · JPL
4237 Raushenbakh	1979 SD_{4}	Raushenbakh	September 24, 1979	Nauchnij	N. S. Chernykh	·	10 km (6.2 mi)	MPC · JPL
4238 Audrey	1980 GF	Audrey	April 13, 1980	Kleť	A. Mrkos	·	5.7 km (3.5 mi)	MPC · JPL
4239 Goodman	1980 OE	Goodman	July 17, 1980	Anderson Mesa	E. Bowell	·	4.4 km (2.7 mi)	MPC · JPL
4240 Grün	1981 EY_{20}	Grün	March 2, 1981	Siding Spring	S. J. Bus	KOR	6.4 km (4.0 mi)	MPC · JPL
4241 Pappalardo	1981 EX_{46}	Pappalardo	March 2, 1981	Siding Spring	S. J. Bus	KOR	3.5 km (2.2 mi)	MPC · JPL
4242 Brecher	1981 FQ	Brecher	March 28, 1981	Harvard Observatory	Harvard Observatory	THM	14 km (8.7 mi)	MPC · JPL
4243 Nankivell	1981 GF_{1}	Nankivell	April 4, 1981	Lake Tekapo	A. C. Gilmore, P. M. Kilmartin	EOS	18 km (11 mi)	MPC · JPL
4244 Zakharchenko	1981 TO_{3}	Zakharchenko	October 7, 1981	Nauchnij	L. I. Chernykh	·	15 km (9.3 mi)	MPC · JPL
4245 Nairc	1981 UC_{10}	Nairc	October 29, 1981	Nanking	Purple Mountain	·	10 km (6.2 mi)	MPC · JPL
4246 Telemann	1982 SY_{2}	Telemann	September 24, 1982	Tautenburg Observatory	F. Börngen	·	4.8 km (3.0 mi)	MPC · JPL
4247 Grahamsmith	1983 WC	Grahamsmith	November 28, 1983	Anderson Mesa	E. Bowell	(3460)	12 km (7.5 mi)	MPC · JPL
4248 Ranald	1984 HX	Ranald	April 23, 1984	Lake Tekapo	A. C. Gilmore, P. M. Kilmartin	·	4.1 km (2.5 mi)	MPC · JPL
4249 Křemže	1984 SC_{2}	Křemže	September 29, 1984	Kleť	A. Mrkos	·	10 km (6.2 mi)	MPC · JPL
4250 Perun	1984 UG	Perun	October 20, 1984	Kleť	Z. Vávrová	·	23 km (14 mi)	MPC · JPL
4251 Kavasch	1985 JK_{1}	Kavasch	May 11, 1985	Palomar	C. S. Shoemaker	NYS	4.3 km (2.7 mi)	MPC · JPL
4252 Godwin	1985 RG_{4}	Godwin	September 11, 1985	La Silla	H. Debehogne	EUN	7.4 km (4.6 mi)	MPC · JPL
4253 Märker	1985 TN_{3}	Märker	October 11, 1985	Palomar	C. S. Shoemaker	·	7.2 km (4.5 mi)	MPC · JPL
4254 Kamél	1985 UT_{3}	Kamél	October 24, 1985	Kvistaberg	C.-I. Lagerkvist	EUN	9.6 km (6.0 mi)	MPC · JPL
4255 Spacewatch	1986 GW	Spacewatch	April 4, 1986	Kitt Peak	Spacewatch	3:2 · SHU	15 km (9.3 mi)	MPC · JPL
4256 Kagamigawa	1986 TX	Kagamigawa	October 3, 1986	Geisei	T. Seki	·	7.6 km (4.7 mi)	MPC · JPL
4257 Ubasti	1987 QA	Ubasti	August 23, 1987	Palomar	J. E. Mueller	APO +1 km (0.62 mi)	2.3 km (1.4 mi)	MPC · JPL
4258 Ryazanov	1987 RZ_{2}	Ryazanov	September 1, 1987	Nauchnij	L. G. Karachkina	·	9.2 km (5.7 mi)	MPC · JPL
4259 McCoy	1988 SB_{3}	McCoy	September 16, 1988	Cerro Tololo	S. J. Bus	KOR	9.2 km (5.7 mi)	MPC · JPL
4260 Yanai	1989 AX	Yanai	January 4, 1989	Kushiro	S. Ueda, H. Kaneda	KOR	10 km (6.2 mi)	MPC · JPL
4261 Gekko	1989 BJ	Gekko	January 28, 1989	Gekko	Y. Oshima	AGN	6.7 km (4.2 mi)	MPC · JPL
4262 DeVorkin	1989 CO	DeVorkin	February 5, 1989	Yorii	M. Arai, H. Mori	·	6.4 km (4.0 mi)	MPC · JPL
4263 Abashiri	1989 RL_{2}	Abashiri	September 7, 1989	Kitami	M. Yanai, K. Watanabe	·	9.0 km (5.6 mi)	MPC · JPL
4264 Karljosephine	1989 TB	Karljosephine	October 2, 1989	Siding Spring	Cwach, K. F. J.	·	4.5 km (2.8 mi)	MPC · JPL
4265 Kani	1989 TX	Kani	October 8, 1989	Kani	Y. Mizuno, T. Furuta	·	14 km (8.7 mi)	MPC · JPL
4266 Waltari	1940 YE	Waltari	December 28, 1940	Turku	Y. Väisälä	·	23 km (14 mi)	MPC · JPL
4267 Basner	1971 QP	Basner	August 18, 1971	Nauchnij	T. M. Smirnova	·	2.7 km (1.7 mi)	MPC · JPL
4268 Grebenikov	1972 TW_{3}	Grebenikov	October 5, 1972	Nauchnij	T. M. Smirnova	·	4.3 km (2.7 mi)	MPC · JPL
4269 Bogado	1974 FN	Bogado	March 22, 1974	Cerro El Roble	C. Torres	·	5.1 km (3.2 mi)	MPC · JPL
4270 Juanvictoria	1975 TJ_{6}	Juanvictoria	October 1, 1975	El Leoncito	Félix Aguilar Observatory	PHO	8.3 km (5.2 mi)	MPC · JPL
4271 Novosibirsk	1976 GQ_{6}	Novosibirsk	April 3, 1976	Nauchnij	N. S. Chernykh	EOS	20 km (12 mi)	MPC · JPL
4272 Entsuji	1977 EG_{5}	Entsuji	March 12, 1977	Kiso	H. Kosai, K. Furukawa	moon	7.7 km (4.8 mi)	MPC · JPL
4273 Dunhuang	1978 UU_{1}	Dunhuang	October 29, 1978	Nanking	Purple Mountain	NYS	4.5 km (2.8 mi)	MPC · JPL
4274 Karamanov	1980 RZ_{3}	Karamanov	September 6, 1980	Nauchnij	N. S. Chernykh	·	13 km (8.1 mi)	MPC · JPL
4275 Bogustafson	1981 EW_{14}	Bogustafson	March 1, 1981	Siding Spring	S. J. Bus	EUN	3.8 km (2.4 mi)	MPC · JPL
4276 Clifford	1981 XA	Clifford	December 2, 1981	Anderson Mesa	E. Bowell	·	4.7 km (2.9 mi)	MPC · JPL
4277 Holubov	1982 AF	Holubov	January 15, 1982	Kleť	A. Mrkos	slow	10 km (6.2 mi)	MPC · JPL
4278 Harvey	1982 SF	Harvey	September 22, 1982	Anderson Mesa	E. Bowell	(2076)	4.5 km (2.8 mi)	MPC · JPL
4279 De Gasparis	1982 WB	De Gasparis	November 19, 1982	Bologna	San Vittore	ERI	7.6 km (4.7 mi)	MPC · JPL
4280 Simonenko	1985 PF_{2}	Simonenko	August 13, 1985	Nauchnij	N. S. Chernykh	slow	5.9 km (3.7 mi)	MPC · JPL
4281 Pounds	1985 TE_{1}	Pounds	October 15, 1985	Anderson Mesa	E. Bowell	·	9.7 km (6.0 mi)	MPC · JPL
4282 Endate	1987 UQ_{1}	Endate	October 28, 1987	Kushiro	S. Ueda, H. Kaneda	·	7.4 km (4.6 mi)	MPC · JPL
4283 Stöffler	1988 BZ	Stöffler	January 23, 1988	Palomar	C. S. Shoemaker	PHO · slow	7.0 km (4.3 mi)	MPC · JPL
4284 Kaho	1988 FL_{3}	Kaho	March 16, 1988	Kushiro	S. Ueda, H. Kaneda	·	11 km (6.8 mi)	MPC · JPL
4285 Hulkower	1988 NH	Hulkower	July 11, 1988	Palomar	E. F. Helin	EUN	7.8 km (4.8 mi)	MPC · JPL
4286 Rubtsov	1988 PU_{4}	Rubtsov	August 8, 1988	Nauchnij	L. I. Chernykh	KOR	10 km (6.2 mi)	MPC · JPL
4287 Třísov	1989 RU_{2}	Třísov	September 7, 1989	Kleť	A. Mrkos	·	5.9 km (3.7 mi)	MPC · JPL
4288 Tokyotech	1989 TQ_{1}	Tokyotech	October 8, 1989	Chiyoda	T. Kojima	EUN · moon	12 km (7.5 mi)	MPC · JPL
4289 Biwako	1989 UA_{2}	Biwako	October 29, 1989	Dynic	A. Sugie	·	7.7 km (4.8 mi)	MPC · JPL
4290 Heisei	1989 UK_{3}	Heisei	October 30, 1989	Geisei	T. Seki	EOS	17 km (11 mi)	MPC · JPL
4291 Kodaihasu	1989 VH	Kodaihasu	November 2, 1989	Yorii	M. Arai, H. Mori	·	18 km (11 mi)	MPC · JPL
4292 Aoba	1989 VO	Aoba	November 4, 1989	Ayashi Station	M. Koishikawa	·	25 km (16 mi)	MPC · JPL
4293 Masumi	1989 VT	Masumi	November 1, 1989	Gekko	Y. Oshima	·	16 km (9.9 mi)	MPC · JPL
4294 Horatius	4016 P-L	Horatius	September 24, 1960	Palomar	C. J. van Houten, I. van Houten-Groeneveld, T. Gehrels	·	8.5 km (5.3 mi)	MPC · JPL
4295 Wisse	6032 P-L	Wisse	September 24, 1960	Palomar	C. J. van Houten, I. van Houten-Groeneveld, T. Gehrels	·	8.0 km (5.0 mi)	MPC · JPL
4296 van Woerkom	1935 SA_{2}	van Woerkom	September 28, 1935	Johannesburg	H. van Gent	(883) · moon	6.1 km (3.8 mi)	MPC · JPL
4297 Eichhorn	1938 HE	Eichhorn	April 19, 1938	Hamburg-Bergedorf	W. Dieckvoss	·	3.7 km (2.3 mi)	MPC · JPL
4298 Jorgenúnez	1941 WA	Jorgenúnez	November 17, 1941	Barcelona	Polit, I.	·	17 km (11 mi)	MPC · JPL
4299 WIYN	1952 QX	WIYN	August 28, 1952	Brooklyn	Indiana University	·	7.9 km (4.9 mi)	MPC · JPL
4300 Marg Edmondson	1955 SG_{1}	Marg Edmondson	September 18, 1955	Brooklyn	Indiana University	·	4.0 km (2.5 mi)	MPC · JPL

== 4301–4400 ==
back to top

Designation			Discovery			Properties		Ref
Permanent	Provisional	Named after	Date	Site	Discoverer(s)	Category	Diam.	Ref
4301 Boyden	1966 PM	Boyden	August 7, 1966	Bloemfontein	Boyden Observatory	THM	14 km (8.7 mi)	MPC · JPL
4302 Markeev	1968 HP	Markeev	April 22, 1968	Nauchnij	T. M. Smirnova	·	7.4 km (4.6 mi)	MPC · JPL
4303 Savitskij	1973 SZ_{3}	Savitskij	September 25, 1973	Nauchnij	L. V. Zhuravleva	·	4.1 km (2.5 mi)	MPC · JPL
4304 Geichenko	1973 SW_{4}	Geichenko	September 27, 1973	Nauchnij	L. I. Chernykh	·	8.4 km (5.2 mi)	MPC · JPL
4305 Clapton	1976 EC	Clapton	March 7, 1976	Harvard Observatory	Harvard Observatory	·	7.9 km (4.9 mi)	MPC · JPL
4306 Dunaevskij	1976 SZ_{5}	Dunaevskij	September 24, 1976	Nauchnij	N. S. Chernykh	THM	9.4 km (5.8 mi)	MPC · JPL
4307 Cherepashchuk	1976 UK_{2}	Cherepashchuk	October 26, 1976	Nauchnij	T. M. Smirnova	·	10 km (6.2 mi)	MPC · JPL
4308 Magarach	1978 PL_{4}	Magarach	August 9, 1978	Nauchnij	N. S. Chernykh	·	9.5 km (5.9 mi)	MPC · JPL
4309 Marvin	1978 QC	Marvin	August 30, 1978	Harvard Observatory	Harvard Observatory	·	5.5 km (3.4 mi)	MPC · JPL
4310 Strömholm	1978 RJ_{7}	Strömholm	September 2, 1978	La Silla	C.-I. Lagerkvist	·	3.6 km (2.2 mi)	MPC · JPL
4311 Zguridi	1978 SY_{6}	Zguridi	September 26, 1978	Nauchnij	L. V. Zhuravleva	V	4.0 km (2.5 mi)	MPC · JPL
4312 Knacke	1978 WW_{11}	Knacke	November 29, 1978	Palomar	S. J. Bus, C. T. Kowal	·	12 km (7.5 mi)	MPC · JPL
4313 Bouchet	1979 HK_{1}	Bouchet	April 21, 1979	La Silla	H. Debehogne	slow	19 km (12 mi)	MPC · JPL
4314 Dervan	1979 ML_{3}	Dervan	June 25, 1979	Siding Spring	E. F. Helin, S. J. Bus	·	5.8 km (3.6 mi)	MPC · JPL
4315 Pronik	1979 SL_{11}	Pronik	September 24, 1979	Nauchnij	N. S. Chernykh	·	21 km (13 mi)	MPC · JPL
4316 Babinkova	1979 TZ_{1}	Babinkova	October 14, 1979	Nauchnij	N. S. Chernykh	KOR	9.7 km (6.0 mi)	MPC · JPL
4317 Garibaldi	1980 DA_{1}	Garibaldi	February 19, 1980	Kleť	Z. Vávrová	HIL · 3:2	39 km (24 mi)	MPC · JPL
4318 Baťa	1980 DE_{1}	Baťa	February 21, 1980	Kleť	Z. Vávrová	·	26 km (16 mi)	MPC · JPL
4319 Jackierobinson	1981 ER_{14}	Jackierobinson	March 1, 1981	Siding Spring	S. J. Bus	·	4.1 km (2.5 mi)	MPC · JPL
4320 Jarosewich	1981 EJ_{17}	Jarosewich	March 1, 1981	Siding Spring	S. J. Bus	·	2.7 km (1.7 mi)	MPC · JPL
4321 Zero	1981 EH_{26}	Zero	March 2, 1981	Siding Spring	S. J. Bus	·	11 km (6.8 mi)	MPC · JPL
4322 Billjackson	1981 EE_{37}	Billjackson	March 11, 1981	Siding Spring	S. J. Bus	·	3.7 km (2.3 mi)	MPC · JPL
4323 Hortulus	1981 QN	Hortulus	August 27, 1981	Zimmerwald	P. Wild	·	4.0 km (2.5 mi)	MPC · JPL
4324 Bickel	1981 YA_{1}	Bickel	December 24, 1981	Socorro	Taff, L. G.	·	12 km (7.5 mi)	MPC · JPL
4325 Guest	1982 HL	Guest	April 18, 1982	Anderson Mesa	E. Bowell	MRX	9.2 km (5.7 mi)	MPC · JPL
4326 McNally	1982 HS_{1}	McNally	April 28, 1982	Anderson Mesa	E. Bowell	·	16 km (9.9 mi)	MPC · JPL
4327 Ries	1982 KB_{1}	Ries	May 24, 1982	Palomar	C. S. Shoemaker	slow	15 km (9.3 mi)	MPC · JPL
4328 Valina	1982 SQ_{2}	Valina	September 18, 1982	La Silla	H. Debehogne	·	3.5 km (2.2 mi)	MPC · JPL
4329 Miró	1982 SX_{2}	Miró	September 22, 1982	Socorro	Taff, L. G.	·	5.3 km (3.3 mi)	MPC · JPL
4330 Vivaldi	1982 UJ_{3}	Vivaldi	October 19, 1982	Tautenburg Observatory	F. Börngen	·	2.5 km (1.6 mi)	MPC · JPL
4331 Hubbard	1983 HC	Hubbard	April 18, 1983	Anderson Mesa	N. G. Thomas	·	6.0 km (3.7 mi)	MPC · JPL
4332 Milton	1983 RC	Milton	September 5, 1983	Palomar	C. S. Shoemaker	·	12 km (7.5 mi)	MPC · JPL
4333 Sinton	1983 RO_{2}	Sinton	September 4, 1983	Anderson Mesa	E. Bowell	·	4.1 km (2.5 mi)	MPC · JPL
4334 Foo	1983 RO_{3}	Foo	September 2, 1983	La Silla	H. Debehogne	THM	10 km (6.2 mi)	MPC · JPL
4335 Verona	1983 VC_{7}	Verona	November 1, 1983	Cavriana	Cavriana	·	5.2 km (3.2 mi)	MPC · JPL
4336 Jasniewicz	1984 QE_{1}	Jasniewicz	August 31, 1984	Anderson Mesa	B. A. Skiff	·	7.2 km (4.5 mi)	MPC · JPL
4337 Arecibo	1985 GB	Arecibo	April 14, 1985	Anderson Mesa	E. Bowell	THM	20 km (12 mi)	MPC · JPL
4338 Velez	1985 PB_{1}	Velez	August 14, 1985	Anderson Mesa	E. Bowell	·	4.0 km (2.5 mi)	MPC · JPL
4339 Almamater	1985 UK	Almamater	October 20, 1985	Kleť	A. Mrkos	·	4.2 km (2.6 mi)	MPC · JPL
4340 Dence	1986 JZ	Dence	May 4, 1986	Palomar	C. S. Shoemaker	PHO	8.1 km (5.0 mi)	MPC · JPL
4341 Poseidon	1987 KF	Poseidon	May 29, 1987	Palomar	C. S. Shoemaker	APO +1 km (0.62 mi)	3.2 km (2.0 mi)	MPC · JPL
4342 Freud	1987 QO_{9}	Freud	August 21, 1987	La Silla	E. W. Elst	·	19 km (12 mi)	MPC · JPL
4343 Tetsuya	1988 AC	Tetsuya	January 10, 1988	Kushiro	S. Ueda, H. Kaneda	DOR	18 km (11 mi)	MPC · JPL
4344 Buxtehude	1988 CR_{1}	Buxtehude	February 11, 1988	La Silla	E. W. Elst	THM	16 km (9.9 mi)	MPC · JPL
4345 Rachmaninoff	1988 CM_{2}	Rachmaninoff	February 11, 1988	La Silla	E. W. Elst	KOR	9.5 km (5.9 mi)	MPC · JPL
4346 Whitney	1988 DS_{4}	Whitney	February 23, 1988	Siding Spring	Noymer, A. J.	EOS	11 km (6.8 mi)	MPC · JPL
4347 Reger	1988 PK_{2}	Reger	August 13, 1988	Tautenburg Observatory	F. Börngen	·	17 km (11 mi)	MPC · JPL
4348 Poulydamas	1988 RU	Poulydamas	September 11, 1988	Palomar	C. S. Shoemaker	L5	82 km (51 mi)	MPC · JPL
4349 Tibúrcio	1989 LX	Tibúrcio	June 5, 1989	La Silla	W. Landgraf	·	28 km (17 mi)	MPC · JPL
4350 Shibecha	1989 UG_{1}	Shibecha	October 26, 1989	Kushiro	S. Ueda, H. Kaneda	moon	11 km (6.8 mi)	MPC · JPL
4351 Nobuhisa	1989 UR_{1}	Nobuhisa	October 28, 1989	Kani	Y. Mizuno, T. Furuta	KOR	8.2 km (5.1 mi)	MPC · JPL
4352 Kyoto	1989 UW_{1}	Kyoto	October 29, 1989	Dynic	A. Sugie	·	12 km (7.5 mi)	MPC · JPL
4353 Onizaki	1989 WK_{1}	Onizaki	November 25, 1989	Kani	Y. Mizuno, T. Furuta	·	11 km (6.8 mi)	MPC · JPL
4354 Euclides	2142 P-L	Euclides	September 24, 1960	Palomar	C. J. van Houten, I. van Houten-Groeneveld, T. Gehrels	DOR	12 km (7.5 mi)	MPC · JPL
4355 Memphis	3524 P-L	Memphis	October 17, 1960	Palomar	C. J. van Houten, I. van Houten-Groeneveld, T. Gehrels	MAR	7.0 km (4.3 mi)	MPC · JPL
4356 Marathon	9522 P-L	Marathon	October 17, 1960	Palomar	C. J. van Houten, I. van Houten-Groeneveld, T. Gehrels	DOR	11 km (6.8 mi)	MPC · JPL
4357 Korinthos	2069 T-2	Korinthos	September 29, 1973	Palomar	C. J. van Houten, I. van Houten-Groeneveld, T. Gehrels	EOS	18 km (11 mi)	MPC · JPL
4358 Lynn	A909 TF	Lynn	October 5, 1909	Greenwich	P. H. Cowell	EUN	9.1 km (5.7 mi)	MPC · JPL
4359 Berlage	1935 TG	Berlage	September 28, 1935	Johannesburg	H. van Gent	·	5.1 km (3.2 mi)	MPC · JPL
4360 Xuyi	1964 TG_{2}	Xuyi	October 9, 1964	Nanking	Purple Mountain	·	13 km (8.1 mi)	MPC · JPL
4361 Nezhdanova	1977 TG_{7}	Nezhdanova	October 9, 1977	Nauchnij	L. I. Chernykh	THM	17 km (11 mi)	MPC · JPL
4362 Carlisle	1978 PR_{4}	Carlisle	August 1, 1978	Bickley	Perth Observatory	moon	5.6 km (3.5 mi)	MPC · JPL
4363 Sergej	1978 TU_{7}	Sergej	October 2, 1978	Nauchnij	L. V. Zhuravleva	·	4.9 km (3.0 mi)	MPC · JPL
4364 Shkodrov	1978 VV_{5}	Shkodrov	November 7, 1978	Palomar	E. F. Helin, S. J. Bus	·	4.2 km (2.6 mi)	MPC · JPL
4365 Ivanova	1978 VH_{8}	Ivanova	November 7, 1978	Palomar	E. F. Helin, S. J. Bus	KOR	7.4 km (4.6 mi)	MPC · JPL
4366 Venikagan	1979 YV_{8}	Venikagan	December 24, 1979	Nauchnij	L. V. Zhuravleva	THM	16 km (9.9 mi)	MPC · JPL
4367 Meech	1981 EE_{43}	Meech	March 2, 1981	Siding Spring	S. J. Bus	·	10 km (6.2 mi)	MPC · JPL
4368 Pillmore	1981 JC_{2}	Pillmore	May 5, 1981	Palomar	C. S. Shoemaker	·	22 km (14 mi)	MPC · JPL
4369 Seifert	1982 OR	Seifert	July 30, 1982	Kleť	L. Brožek	·	16 km (9.9 mi)	MPC · JPL
4370 Dickens	1982 SL	Dickens	September 22, 1982	Anderson Mesa	E. Bowell	moon	3.8 km (2.4 mi)	MPC · JPL
4371 Fyodorov	1983 GC_{2}	Fyodorov	April 10, 1983	Nauchnij	L. I. Chernykh	·	5.6 km (3.5 mi)	MPC · JPL
4372 Quincy	1984 TB	Quincy	October 3, 1984	Harvard Observatory	Oak Ridge Observatory	KOR	8.2 km (5.1 mi)	MPC · JPL
4373 Crespo	1985 PB	Crespo	August 14, 1985	Anderson Mesa	E. Bowell	·	5.0 km (3.1 mi)	MPC · JPL
4374 Tadamori	1987 BJ	Tadamori	January 31, 1987	Toyota	K. Suzuki, T. Urata	·	5.7 km (3.5 mi)	MPC · JPL
4375 Kiyomori	1987 DQ	Kiyomori	February 28, 1987	Ojima	T. Niijima, T. Urata	(2076)	5.2 km (3.2 mi)	MPC · JPL
4376 Shigemori	1987 FA	Shigemori	March 20, 1987	Ojima	T. Niijima, T. Urata	·	5.0 km (3.1 mi)	MPC · JPL
4377 Koremori	1987 GD	Koremori	April 4, 1987	Ojima	T. Niijima, T. Urata	·	9.5 km (5.9 mi)	MPC · JPL
4378 Voigt	1988 JF	Voigt	May 14, 1988	La Silla	W. Landgraf	·	11 km (6.8 mi)	MPC · JPL
4379 Snelling	1988 PT_{1}	Snelling	August 13, 1988	Palomar	C. S. Shoemaker, E. M. Shoemaker	·	20 km (12 mi)	MPC · JPL
4380 Geyer	1988 PB_{2}	Geyer	August 14, 1988	Haute-Provence	E. W. Elst	EOS	17 km (11 mi)	MPC · JPL
4381 Uenohara	1989 WD_{1}	Uenohara	November 22, 1989	Uenohara	N. Kawasato	EOS	20 km (12 mi)	MPC · JPL
4382 Stravinsky	1989 WQ_{3}	Stravinsky	November 29, 1989	Tautenburg Observatory	F. Börngen	·	8.7 km (5.4 mi)	MPC · JPL
4383 Suruga	1989 XP	Suruga	December 1, 1989	Gekko	Y. Oshima	moon	6.5 km (4.0 mi)	MPC · JPL
4384 Henrybuhl	1990 AA	Henrybuhl	January 3, 1990	Okutama	Hioki, T., Hayakawa, S.	EUN	8.6 km (5.3 mi)	MPC · JPL
4385 Elsässer	2534 P-L	Elsässer	September 24, 1960	Palomar	C. J. van Houten, I. van Houten-Groeneveld, T. Gehrels	THM	11 km (6.8 mi)	MPC · JPL
4386 Lüst	6829 P-L	Lüst	September 26, 1960	Palomar	C. J. van Houten, I. van Houten-Groeneveld, T. Gehrels	·	16 km (9.9 mi)	MPC · JPL
4387 Tanaka	4829 T-2	Tanaka	September 19, 1973	Palomar	C. J. van Houten, I. van Houten-Groeneveld, T. Gehrels	·	7.1 km (4.4 mi)	MPC · JPL
4388 Jürgenstock	1964 VE	Jürgenstock	November 3, 1964	Brooklyn	Indiana University	·	4.7 km (2.9 mi)	MPC · JPL
4389 Durbin	1976 GL_{3}	Durbin	April 1, 1976	Nauchnij	N. S. Chernykh	KOR	10 km (6.2 mi)	MPC · JPL
4390 Madreteresa	1976 GO_{8}	Madreteresa	April 5, 1976	El Leoncito	Félix Aguilar Observatory	·	11 km (6.8 mi)	MPC · JPL
4391 Balodis	1977 QW_{2}	Balodis	August 21, 1977	Nauchnij	N. S. Chernykh	·	3.4 km (2.1 mi)	MPC · JPL
4392 Agita	1978 RX_{5}	Agita	September 13, 1978	Nauchnij	N. S. Chernykh	·	4.8 km (3.0 mi)	MPC · JPL
4393 Dawe	1978 VP_{8}	Dawe	November 7, 1978	Palomar	E. F. Helin, S. J. Bus	THM	15 km (9.3 mi)	MPC · JPL
4394 Fritzheide	1981 EB_{19}	Fritzheide	March 2, 1981	Siding Spring	S. J. Bus	·	2.6 km (1.6 mi)	MPC · JPL
4395 Danbritt	1981 EH_{41}	Danbritt	March 2, 1981	Siding Spring	S. J. Bus	EOS	11 km (6.8 mi)	MPC · JPL
4396 Gressmann	1981 JH	Gressmann	May 3, 1981	Anderson Mesa	E. Bowell	·	4.7 km (2.9 mi)	MPC · JPL
4397 Jalopez	1981 JS_{1}	Jalopez	May 9, 1981	El Leoncito	Félix Aguilar Observatory	·	4.6 km (2.9 mi)	MPC · JPL
4398 Chiara	1984 HC_{2}	Chiara	April 23, 1984	La Silla	W. Ferreri	·	6.9 km (4.3 mi)	MPC · JPL
4399 Ashizuri	1984 UA	Ashizuri	October 21, 1984	Geisei	T. Seki	EUN	8.8 km (5.5 mi)	MPC · JPL
4400 Bagryana	1985 QH_{4}	Bagryana	August 24, 1985	Smolyan	Bulgarian National Observatory	·	5.4 km (3.4 mi)	MPC · JPL

== 4401–4500 ==
back to top

Designation			Discovery			Properties		Ref
Permanent	Provisional	Named after	Date	Site	Discoverer(s)	Category	Diam.	Ref
4401 Aditi	1985 TB	Aditi	October 14, 1985	Palomar	C. S. Shoemaker	AMO +1 km (0.62 mi)	1.8 km (1.1 mi)	MPC · JPL
4402 Tsunemori	1987 DP	Tsunemori	February 25, 1987	Ojima	T. Niijima, T. Urata	·	9.2 km (5.7 mi)	MPC · JPL
4403 Kuniharu	1987 EA	Kuniharu	March 2, 1987	Gekko	Y. Oshima	·	4.8 km (3.0 mi)	MPC · JPL
4404 Enirac	1987 GG	Enirac	April 2, 1987	Palomar	A. Maury	·	6.2 km (3.9 mi)	MPC · JPL
4405 Otava	1987 QD_{1}	Otava	August 21, 1987	Kleť	A. Mrkos	·	16 km (9.9 mi)	MPC · JPL
4406 Mahler	1987 YD_{1}	Mahler	December 22, 1987	Tautenburg Observatory	F. Börngen	THM	13 km (8.1 mi)	MPC · JPL
4407 Taihaku	1988 TF_{1}	Taihaku	October 13, 1988	Ayashi Station	M. Koishikawa	·	9.3 km (5.8 mi)	MPC · JPL
4408 Zlatá Koruna	1988 TH_{2}	Zlatá Koruna	October 4, 1988	Kleť	A. Mrkos	·	8.6 km (5.3 mi)	MPC · JPL
4409 Kissling	1989 MD	Kissling	June 30, 1989	Lake Tekapo	A. C. Gilmore, P. M. Kilmartin	·	12 km (7.5 mi)	MPC · JPL
4410 Kamuimintara	1989 YA	Kamuimintara	December 17, 1989	Kushiro	S. Ueda, H. Kaneda	EOS	14 km (8.7 mi)	MPC · JPL
4411 Kochibunkyo	1990 AF	Kochibunkyo	January 3, 1990	Geisei	T. Seki	moon	4.4 km (2.7 mi)	MPC · JPL
4412 Chephren	2535 P-L	Chephren	September 26, 1960	Palomar	C. J. van Houten, I. van Houten-Groeneveld, T. Gehrels	THM	15 km (9.3 mi)	MPC · JPL
4413 Mycerinos	4020 P-L	Mycerinos	September 24, 1960	Palomar	C. J. van Houten, I. van Houten-Groeneveld, T. Gehrels	·	5.1 km (3.2 mi)	MPC · JPL
4414 Sesostris	4153 P-L	Sesostris	September 24, 1960	Palomar	C. J. van Houten, I. van Houten-Groeneveld, T. Gehrels	·	9.0 km (5.6 mi)	MPC · JPL
4415 Echnaton	4237 P-L	Echnaton	September 24, 1960	Palomar	C. J. van Houten, I. van Houten-Groeneveld, T. Gehrels	·	3.2 km (2.0 mi)	MPC · JPL
4416 Ramses	4530 P-L	Ramses	September 24, 1960	Palomar	C. J. van Houten, I. van Houten-Groeneveld, T. Gehrels	·	3.0 km (1.9 mi)	MPC · JPL
4417 Lecar	1931 GC	Lecar	April 8, 1931	Heidelberg	K. Reinmuth	GEF	11 km (6.8 mi)	MPC · JPL
4418 Fredfranklin	1931 TR_{1}	Fredfranklin	October 9, 1931	Heidelberg	K. Reinmuth	EUN	7.0 km (4.3 mi)	MPC · JPL
4419 Allancook	1932 HD	Allancook	April 24, 1932	Heidelberg	K. Reinmuth	·	10 km (6.2 mi)	MPC · JPL
4420 Alandreev	1936 PB	Alandreev	August 15, 1936	Crimea-Simeis	G. N. Neujmin	·	16 km (9.9 mi)	MPC · JPL
4421 Kayor	1942 AC	Kayor	January 14, 1942	Heidelberg	K. Reinmuth	·	9.2 km (5.7 mi)	MPC · JPL
4422 Jarre	1942 UA	Jarre	October 17, 1942	Algiers	L. Boyer	·	6.3 km (3.9 mi)	MPC · JPL
4423 Golden	1949 GH	Golden	April 4, 1949	Brooklyn	Indiana University	CYB	9.9 km (6.2 mi)	MPC · JPL
4424 Arkhipova	1967 DB	Arkhipova	February 16, 1967	Nauchnij	T. M. Smirnova	·	24 km (15 mi)	MPC · JPL
4425 Bilk	1967 UQ	Bilk	October 30, 1967	Hamburg-Bergedorf	L. Kohoutek	NYS	5.3 km (3.3 mi)	MPC · JPL
4426 Roerich	1969 TB_{6}	Roerich	October 15, 1969	Nauchnij	L. I. Chernykh	AGN	11 km (6.8 mi)	MPC · JPL
4427 Burnashev	1971 QP_{1}	Burnashev	August 30, 1971	Nauchnij	T. M. Smirnova	EOS	12 km (7.5 mi)	MPC · JPL
4428 Khotinok	1977 SN	Khotinok	September 18, 1977	Nauchnij	N. S. Chernykh	slow	6.0 km (3.7 mi)	MPC · JPL
4429 Chinmoy	1978 RJ_{2}	Chinmoy	September 12, 1978	Nauchnij	N. S. Chernykh	NYS	2.9 km (1.8 mi)	MPC · JPL
4430 Govorukhin	1978 SX_{6}	Govorukhin	September 26, 1978	Nauchnij	L. V. Zhuravleva	·	8.9 km (5.5 mi)	MPC · JPL
4431 Holeungholee	1978 WU_{14}	Holeungholee	November 28, 1978	Nanking	Purple Mountain	EOS	24 km (15 mi)	MPC · JPL
4432 McGraw-Hill	1981 ER_{22}	McGraw-Hill	March 2, 1981	Siding Spring	S. J. Bus	·	3.0 km (1.9 mi)	MPC · JPL
4433 Goldstone	1981 QP	Goldstone	August 30, 1981	Anderson Mesa	E. Bowell	·	8.4 km (5.2 mi)	MPC · JPL
4434 Nikulin	1981 RD_{5}	Nikulin	September 8, 1981	Nauchnij	L. V. Zhuravleva	·	5.1 km (3.2 mi)	MPC · JPL
4435 Holt	1983 AG_{2}	Holt	January 13, 1983	Palomar	C. S. Shoemaker	moon	5.0 km (3.1 mi)	MPC · JPL
4436 Ortizmoreno	1983 EX	Ortizmoreno	March 9, 1983	Anderson Mesa	E. Barr	URS	31 km (19 mi)	MPC · JPL
4437 Yaroshenko	1983 GA_{2}	Yaroshenko	April 10, 1983	Nauchnij	L. I. Chernykh	·	4.7 km (2.9 mi)	MPC · JPL
4438 Sykes	1983 WR	Sykes	November 29, 1983	Anderson Mesa	E. Bowell	·	27 km (17 mi)	MPC · JPL
4439 Muroto	1984 VA	Muroto	November 2, 1984	Geisei	T. Seki	·	12 km (7.5 mi)	MPC · JPL
4440 Tchantchès	1984 YV	Tchantchès	December 23, 1984	Haute-Provence	F. Dossin	H · moon	2.1 km (1.3 mi)	MPC · JPL
4441 Toshie	1985 BB	Toshie	January 26, 1985	Geisei	T. Seki	·	6.5 km (4.0 mi)	MPC · JPL
4442 Garcia	1985 RB_{1}	Garcia	September 14, 1985	Kitt Peak	Spacewatch	·	15 km (9.3 mi)	MPC · JPL
4443 Paulet	1985 RD_{4}	Paulet	September 10, 1985	La Silla	H. Debehogne	slow	4.6 km (2.9 mi)	MPC · JPL
4444 Escher	1985 SA	Escher	September 16, 1985	La Silla	Norgaard-Nielsen, H. U., Hansen, L., Christensen, P. R.	V	4.0 km (2.5 mi)	MPC · JPL
4445 Jimstratton	1985 TC	Jimstratton	October 15, 1985	Toyota	K. Suzuki, T. Urata	·	4.1 km (2.5 mi)	MPC · JPL
4446 Carolyn	1985 TT	Carolyn	October 15, 1985	Anderson Mesa	E. Bowell	T_{j} (2.97) · 3:2	29 km (18 mi)	MPC · JPL
4447 Kirov	1985 VE_{1}	Kirov	November 7, 1985	Anderson Mesa	E. Bowell	KOR	10 km (6.2 mi)	MPC · JPL
4448 Phildavis	1986 EO	Phildavis	March 5, 1986	Palomar	C. S. Shoemaker	·	13 km (8.1 mi)	MPC · JPL
4449 Sobinov	1987 RX_{3}	Sobinov	September 3, 1987	Nauchnij	L. I. Chernykh	·	30 km (19 mi)	MPC · JPL
4450 Pan	1987 SY	Pan	September 25, 1987	Palomar	C. S. Shoemaker, E. M. Shoemaker	APO +1 km (0.62 mi) · PHA	1.2 km (0.75 mi)	MPC · JPL
4451 Grieve	1988 JJ	Grieve	May 9, 1988	Palomar	C. S. Shoemaker	·	10 km (6.2 mi)	MPC · JPL
4452 Ullacharles	1988 RN	Ullacharles	September 7, 1988	Brorfelde	P. Jensen	EUN	16 km (9.9 mi)	MPC · JPL
4453 Bornholm	1988 VC	Bornholm	November 3, 1988	Brorfelde	P. Jensen	EOS	11 km (6.8 mi)	MPC · JPL
4454 Kumiko	1988 VW	Kumiko	November 2, 1988	Kushiro	S. Ueda, H. Kaneda	·	13 km (8.1 mi)	MPC · JPL
4455 Ruriko	1988 XA	Ruriko	December 2, 1988	Kushiro	S. Ueda, H. Kaneda	EOS	14 km (8.7 mi)	MPC · JPL
4456 Mawson	1989 OG	Mawson	July 27, 1989	Siding Spring	R. H. McNaught	·	7.6 km (4.7 mi)	MPC · JPL
4457 van Gogh	1989 RU	van Gogh	September 3, 1989	Haute-Provence	E. W. Elst	·	10 km (6.2 mi)	MPC · JPL
4458 Oizumi	1990 BY	Oizumi	January 21, 1990	Yatsugatake	Y. Kushida, O. Muramatsu	·	12 km (7.5 mi)	MPC · JPL
4459 Nusamaibashi	1990 BP_{2}	Nusamaibashi	January 30, 1990	Kushiro	Matsuyama, M., K. Watanabe	slow	4.2 km (2.6 mi)	MPC · JPL
4460 Bihoro	1990 DS	Bihoro	February 28, 1990	Kitami	K. Endate, K. Watanabe	·	39 km (24 mi)	MPC · JPL
4461 Sayama	1990 EL	Sayama	March 5, 1990	Dynic	A. Sugie	BRA	17 km (11 mi)	MPC · JPL
4462 Vaughan	1952 HJ_{2}	Vaughan	April 24, 1952	Fort Davis	McDonald Observatory	THM	19 km (12 mi)	MPC · JPL
4463 Marschwarzschild	1954 UO_{2}	Marschwarzschild	October 28, 1954	Brooklyn	Indiana University	THM	14 km (8.7 mi)	MPC · JPL
4464 Vulcano	1966 TE	Vulcano	October 11, 1966	Nauchnij	N. S. Chernykh	H	3.6 km (2.2 mi)	MPC · JPL
4465 Rodita	1969 TD_{5}	Rodita	October 14, 1969	Nauchnij	B. A. Burnasheva	NYS ·	10 km (6.2 mi)	MPC · JPL
4466 Abai	1971 SX_{1}	Abai	September 23, 1971	Nauchnij	Crimean Astrophysical Observatory	·	11 km (6.8 mi)	MPC · JPL
4467 Kaidanovskij	1975 VN_{2}	Kaidanovskij	November 2, 1975	Nauchnij	T. M. Smirnova	EUN ·	13 km (8.1 mi)	MPC · JPL
4468 Pogrebetskij	1976 SZ_{3}	Pogrebetskij	September 24, 1976	Nauchnij	N. S. Chernykh	·	4.2 km (2.6 mi)	MPC · JPL
4469 Utting	1978 PS_{4}	Utting	August 1, 1978	Bickley	Perth Observatory	·	4.8 km (3.0 mi)	MPC · JPL
4470 Sergeev-Censkij	1978 QP_{1}	Sergeev-Censkij	August 31, 1978	Nauchnij	N. S. Chernykh	THM	16 km (9.9 mi)	MPC · JPL
4471 Graculus	1978 VB	Graculus	November 8, 1978	Zimmerwald	P. Wild	·	12 km (7.5 mi)	MPC · JPL
4472 Navashin	1980 TY_{14}	Navashin	October 15, 1980	Nauchnij	N. S. Chernykh	slow	5.1 km (3.2 mi)	MPC · JPL
4473 Sears	1981 DE_{2}	Sears	February 28, 1981	Siding Spring	S. J. Bus	EOS	13 km (8.1 mi)	MPC · JPL
4474 Proust	1981 QZ_{2}	Proust	August 24, 1981	La Silla	H. Debehogne	THM	13 km (8.1 mi)	MPC · JPL
4475 Voitkevich	1982 UQ_{5}	Voitkevich	October 20, 1982	Nauchnij	L. G. Karachkina	·	5.3 km (3.3 mi)	MPC · JPL
4476 Bernstein	1983 DE	Bernstein	February 19, 1983	Anderson Mesa	E. Bowell	NYS	6.7 km (4.2 mi)	MPC · JPL
4477 Kelley	1983 SB	Kelley	September 28, 1983	Smolyan	Bulgarian National Observatory	·	4.8 km (3.0 mi)	MPC · JPL
4478 Blanco	1984 HG_{1}	Blanco	April 23, 1984	La Silla	W. Ferreri, V. Zappalà	·	3.5 km (2.2 mi)	MPC · JPL
4479 Charlieparker	1985 CP_{1}	Charlieparker	February 10, 1985	La Silla	H. Debehogne	MRX	6.9 km (4.3 mi)	MPC · JPL
4480 Nikitibotania	1985 QM_{4}	Nikitibotania	August 24, 1985	Nauchnij	N. S. Chernykh	NYS ·	9.3 km (5.8 mi)	MPC · JPL
4481 Herbelin	1985 RR	Herbelin	September 14, 1985	Anderson Mesa	E. Bowell	·	4.2 km (2.6 mi)	MPC · JPL
4482 Frèrebasile	1986 RB	Frèrebasile	September 1, 1986	Palomar	A. Maury	PHO	7.1 km (4.4 mi)	MPC · JPL
4483 Petöfi	1986 RC_{2}	Petöfi	September 9, 1986	Nauchnij	L. G. Karachkina	H	5.8 km (3.6 mi)	MPC · JPL
4484 Sif	1987 DD	Sif	February 25, 1987	Brorfelde	P. Jensen	·	16 km (9.9 mi)	MPC · JPL
4485 Radonezhskij	1987 QQ_{11}	Radonezhskij	August 27, 1987	Nauchnij	L. I. Chernykh	EOS	14 km (8.7 mi)	MPC · JPL
4486 Mithra	1987 SB	Mithra	September 22, 1987	Smolyan	E. W. Elst, V. G. Shkodrov	APO +1 km (0.62 mi) · PHA	1.8 km (1.1 mi)	MPC · JPL
4487 Pocahontas	1987 UA	Pocahontas	October 17, 1987	Palomar	C. S. Shoemaker	AMO +1 km (0.62 mi)	1.1 km (0.68 mi)	MPC · JPL
4488 Tokitada	1987 UK	Tokitada	October 21, 1987	Toyota	K. Suzuki, T. Urata	·	4.5 km (2.8 mi)	MPC · JPL
4489 Dracius	1988 AK	Dracius	January 15, 1988	Anderson Mesa	E. Bowell	L4	77 km (48 mi)	MPC · JPL
4490 Bambery	1988 ND	Bambery	July 14, 1988	Palomar	E. F. Helin, B. Roman	H	9.3 km (5.8 mi)	MPC · JPL
4491 Otaru	1988 RP	Otaru	September 7, 1988	Kitami	K. Endate, K. Watanabe	·	5.1 km (3.2 mi)	MPC · JPL
4492 Debussy	1988 SH	Debussy	September 17, 1988	Haute-Provence	E. W. Elst	moon	17 km (11 mi)	MPC · JPL
4493 Naitomitsu	1988 TG_{1}	Naitomitsu	October 14, 1988	Chiyoda	T. Kojima	EOS	17 km (11 mi)	MPC · JPL
4494 Marimo	1988 TK_{1}	Marimo	October 13, 1988	Kushiro	S. Ueda, H. Kaneda	moon	7.2 km (4.5 mi)	MPC · JPL
4495 Dassanowsky	1988 VS	Dassanowsky	November 6, 1988	Yorii	M. Arai, H. Mori	3:2 · slow	24 km (15 mi)	MPC · JPL
4496 Kamimachi	1988 XM_{1}	Kamimachi	December 9, 1988	Geisei	T. Seki	·	7.2 km (4.5 mi)	MPC · JPL
4497 Taguchi	1989 AE_{1}	Taguchi	January 4, 1989	Kitami	K. Endate, K. Watanabe	·	7.8 km (4.8 mi)	MPC · JPL
4498 Shinkoyama	1989 AG_{1}	Shinkoyama	January 5, 1989	Geisei	T. Seki	EOS	17 km (11 mi)	MPC · JPL
4499 Davidallen	1989 AO_{3}	Davidallen	January 4, 1989	Siding Spring	R. H. McNaught	·	16 km (9.9 mi)	MPC · JPL
4500 Pascal	1989 CL	Pascal	February 3, 1989	Kushiro	S. Ueda, H. Kaneda	·	16 km (9.9 mi)	MPC · JPL

== 4501–4600 ==
back to top

Designation			Discovery			Properties		Ref
Permanent	Provisional	Named after	Date	Site	Discoverer(s)	Category	Diam.	Ref
4501 Eurypylos	1989 CJ_{3}	Eurypylos	February 4, 1989	La Silla	E. W. Elst	L4	46 km (29 mi)	MPC · JPL
4502 Elizabethann	1989 KG	Elizabethann	May 29, 1989	Palomar	H. E. Holt	EUN	12 km (7.5 mi)	MPC · JPL
4503 Cleobulus	1989 WM	Cleobulus	November 28, 1989	Palomar	C. S. Shoemaker	AMO +1 km (0.62 mi)	2.4 km (1.5 mi)	MPC · JPL
4504 Jenkinson	1989 YO	Jenkinson	December 21, 1989	Siding Spring	R. H. McNaught	MAR	7.4 km (4.6 mi)	MPC · JPL
4505 Okamura	1990 DV_{1}	Okamura	February 20, 1990	Geisei	T. Seki	EOS	19 km (12 mi)	MPC · JPL
4506 Hendrie	1990 FJ	Hendrie	March 24, 1990	Stakenbridge	B. G. W. Manning	KOR	8.8 km (5.5 mi)	MPC · JPL
4507 Petercollins	1990 FV	Petercollins	March 19, 1990	Fujieda	Shiozawa, H., M. Kizawa	KOR	11 km (6.8 mi)	MPC · JPL
4508 Takatsuki	1990 FG_{1}	Takatsuki	March 27, 1990	Kitami	K. Endate, K. Watanabe	·	4.6 km (2.9 mi)	MPC · JPL
4509 Gorbatskij	A917 SG	Gorbatskij	September 23, 1917	Crimea-Simeis	S. Belyavsky	·	12 km (7.5 mi)	MPC · JPL
4510 Shawna	1930 XK	Shawna	December 13, 1930	Flagstaff	C. W. Tombaugh	V	6.8 km (4.2 mi)	MPC · JPL
4511 Rembrandt	1935 SP_{1}	Rembrandt	September 28, 1935	Johannesburg	H. van Gent	PHO	8.2 km (5.1 mi)	MPC · JPL
4512 Sinuhe	1939 BM	Sinuhe	January 20, 1939	Turku	Y. Väisälä	·	11 km (6.8 mi)	MPC · JPL
4513 Louvre	1971 QW_{1}	Louvre	August 30, 1971	Nauchnij	T. M. Smirnova	EOS	13 km (8.1 mi)	MPC · JPL
4514 Vilen	1972 HX	Vilen	April 19, 1972	Nauchnij	T. M. Smirnova	moon	5.8 km (3.6 mi)	MPC · JPL
4515 Khrennikov	1973 SD_{6}	Khrennikov	September 28, 1973	Nauchnij	N. S. Chernykh	NYS	5.3 km (3.3 mi)	MPC · JPL
4516 Pugovkin	1973 SN_{6}	Pugovkin	September 28, 1973	Nauchnij	N. S. Chernykh	HOF ·	7.8 km (4.8 mi)	MPC · JPL
4517 Ralpharvey	1975 SV	Ralpharvey	September 30, 1975	Palomar	S. J. Bus	·	3.4 km (2.1 mi)	MPC · JPL
4518 Raikin	1976 GP_{3}	Raikin	April 1, 1976	Nauchnij	N. S. Chernykh	V	4.3 km (2.7 mi)	MPC · JPL
4519 Voronezh	1976 YO_{4}	Voronezh	December 18, 1976	Nauchnij	N. S. Chernykh	·	5.0 km (3.1 mi)	MPC · JPL
4520 Dovzhenko	1977 QJ_{3}	Dovzhenko	August 22, 1977	Nauchnij	N. S. Chernykh	·	5.9 km (3.7 mi)	MPC · JPL
4521 Akimov	1979 FU_{2}	Akimov	March 29, 1979	Nauchnij	N. S. Chernykh	·	20 km (12 mi)	MPC · JPL
4522 Britastra	1980 BM	Britastra	January 22, 1980	Anderson Mesa	E. Bowell	ADE	21 km (13 mi)	MPC · JPL
4523 MIT	1981 DM_{1}	MIT	February 28, 1981	Siding Spring	S. J. Bus	ADE	16 km (9.9 mi)	MPC · JPL
4524 Barklajdetolli	1981 RV_{4}	Barklajdetolli	September 8, 1981	Nauchnij	L. V. Zhuravleva	V · slow	12 km (7.5 mi)	MPC · JPL
4525 Johnbauer	1982 JB_{3}	Johnbauer	May 15, 1982	Palomar	E. F. Helin, E. M. Shoemaker, Wilder, P. D.	·	9.8 km (6.1 mi)	MPC · JPL
4526 Konko	1982 KN_{1}	Konko	May 22, 1982	Kiso	H. Kosai, K. Furukawa	EUN · slow	10 km (6.2 mi)	MPC · JPL
4527 Schoenberg	1982 OK	Schoenberg	July 24, 1982	Anderson Mesa	E. Bowell	·	3.9 km (2.4 mi)	MPC · JPL
4528 Berg	1983 PP	Berg	August 13, 1983	Anderson Mesa	E. Bowell	moon	9.4 km (5.8 mi)	MPC · JPL
4529 Webern	1984 ED	Webern	March 1, 1984	Anderson Mesa	E. Bowell	EOS	10 km (6.2 mi)	MPC · JPL
4530 Smoluchowski	1984 EP	Smoluchowski	March 1, 1984	Anderson Mesa	E. Bowell	HYG	16 km (9.9 mi)	MPC · JPL
4531 Asaro	1985 FC	Asaro	March 20, 1985	Palomar	C. S. Shoemaker	H	2.2 km (1.4 mi)	MPC · JPL
4532 Copland	1985 GM_{1}	Copland	April 15, 1985	Anderson Mesa	E. Bowell	EOS · slow	14 km (8.7 mi)	MPC · JPL
4533 Orth	1986 EL	Orth	March 7, 1986	Palomar	C. S. Shoemaker	PHO	7.5 km (4.7 mi)	MPC · JPL
4534 Rimskij-Korsakov	1986 PV_{4}	Rimskij-Korsakov	August 6, 1986	Nauchnij	N. S. Chernykh	·	16 km (9.9 mi)	MPC · JPL
4535 Adamcarolla	1986 QV_{2}	Adamcarolla	August 28, 1986	La Silla	H. Debehogne	·	10 km (6.2 mi)	MPC · JPL
4536 Drewpinsky	1987 DA_{6}	Drewpinsky	February 22, 1987	La Silla	H. Debehogne	·	4.0 km (2.5 mi)	MPC · JPL
4537 Valgrirasp	1987 RR_{3}	Valgrirasp	September 2, 1987	Nauchnij	L. I. Chernykh	EOS ·	14 km (8.7 mi)	MPC · JPL
4538 Vishyanand	1988 TP	Vishyanand	October 10, 1988	Toyota	K. Suzuki	slow	7.2 km (4.5 mi)	MPC · JPL
4539 Miyagino	1988 VU_{1}	Miyagino	November 8, 1988	Ayashi Station	M. Koishikawa	·	10 km (6.2 mi)	MPC · JPL
4540 Oriani	1988 VY_{1}	Oriani	November 6, 1988	Bologna	San Vittore	·	15 km (9.3 mi)	MPC · JPL
4541 Mizuno	1989 AF	Mizuno	January 1, 1989	Toyota	K. Suzuki, T. Furuta	moon	6.3 km (3.9 mi)	MPC · JPL
4542 Mossotti	1989 BO	Mossotti	January 30, 1989	Bologna	San Vittore	EOS	18 km (11 mi)	MPC · JPL
4543 Phoinix	1989 CQ_{1}	Phoinix	February 2, 1989	Palomar	C. S. Shoemaker	L4	64 km (40 mi)	MPC · JPL
4544 Xanthus	1989 FB	Xanthus	March 31, 1989	Palomar	H. E. Holt, N. G. Thomas	APO +1 km (0.62 mi)	1.3 km (0.81 mi)	MPC · JPL
4545 Primolevi	1989 SB_{11}	Primolevi	September 28, 1989	La Silla	H. Debehogne	THM	17 km (11 mi)	MPC · JPL
4546 Franck	1990 EW_{2}	Franck	March 2, 1990	La Silla	E. W. Elst	V	5.7 km (3.5 mi)	MPC · JPL
4547 Massachusetts	1990 KP	Massachusetts	May 16, 1990	JCPM Sapporo	K. Endate, K. Watanabe	·	33 km (21 mi)	MPC · JPL
4548 Wielen	2538 P-L	Wielen	September 24, 1960	Palomar	C. J. van Houten, I. van Houten-Groeneveld, T. Gehrels	·	5.2 km (3.2 mi)	MPC · JPL
4549 Burkhardt	1276 T-2	Burkhardt	September 29, 1973	Palomar	C. J. van Houten, I. van Houten-Groeneveld, T. Gehrels	NYS	5.5 km (3.4 mi)	MPC · JPL
4550 Royclarke	1977 HH_{1}	Royclarke	April 24, 1977	Palomar	S. J. Bus	·	13 km (8.1 mi)	MPC · JPL
4551 Cochran	1979 MC	Cochran	June 28, 1979	Anderson Mesa	E. Bowell	·	7.6 km (4.7 mi)	MPC · JPL
4552 Nabelek	1980 JC	Nabelek	May 11, 1980	Kleť	A. Mrkos	·	6.2 km (3.9 mi)	MPC · JPL
4553 Doncampbell	1982 RH	Doncampbell	September 15, 1982	Anderson Mesa	E. Bowell	EUN	9.0 km (5.6 mi)	MPC · JPL
4554 Fanynka	1986 UT	Fanynka	October 28, 1986	Kleť	A. Mrkos	·	26 km (16 mi)	MPC · JPL
4555 Josefapérez	1987 QL	Josefapérez	August 24, 1987	Palomar	S. Singer-Brewster	·	3.1 km (1.9 mi)	MPC · JPL
4556 Gumilyov	1987 QW_{10}	Gumilyov	August 27, 1987	Nauchnij	L. G. Karachkina	·	5.2 km (3.2 mi)	MPC · JPL
4557 Mika	1987 XD	Mika	December 14, 1987	Kitami	M. Yanai, K. Watanabe	EOS	14 km (8.7 mi)	MPC · JPL
4558 Janesick	1988 NF	Janesick	July 12, 1988	Palomar	A. Maury, J. E. Mueller	slow	7.3 km (4.5 mi)	MPC · JPL
4559 Strauss	1989 AP_{6}	Strauss	January 11, 1989	Tautenburg Observatory	F. Börngen	EOS	11 km (6.8 mi)	MPC · JPL
4560 Klyuchevskij	1976 YD_{2}	Klyuchevskij	December 16, 1976	Nauchnij	L. I. Chernykh	·	12 km (7.5 mi)	MPC · JPL
4561 Lemeshev	1978 RY_{5}	Lemeshev	September 13, 1978	Nauchnij	N. S. Chernykh	·	10 km (6.2 mi)	MPC · JPL
4562 Poleungkuk	1979 UD_{2}	Poleungkuk	October 21, 1979	Nanking	Purple Mountain	·	15 km (9.3 mi)	MPC · JPL
4563 Kahnia	1980 OG	Kahnia	July 17, 1980	Anderson Mesa	E. Bowell	·	5.1 km (3.2 mi)	MPC · JPL
4564 Clayton	1981 ET_{16}	Clayton	March 6, 1981	Siding Spring	S. J. Bus	EUN	5.1 km (3.2 mi)	MPC · JPL
4565 Grossman	1981 EZ_{17}	Grossman	March 2, 1981	Siding Spring	S. J. Bus	EUN	7.4 km (4.6 mi)	MPC · JPL
4566 Chaokuangpiu	1981 WM_{4}	Chaokuangpiu	November 27, 1981	Nanking	Purple Mountain	·	11 km (6.8 mi)	MPC · JPL
4567 Bečvář	1982 SO_{1}	Bečvář	September 17, 1982	Kleť	Mahrová, M.	EUN	12 km (7.5 mi)	MPC · JPL
4568 Menkaure	1983 RY_{3}	Menkaure	September 2, 1983	Anderson Mesa	N. G. Thomas	EOS	15 km (9.3 mi)	MPC · JPL
4569 Baerbel	1985 GV_{1}	Baerbel	April 15, 1985	Palomar	C. S. Shoemaker	MAR	9.4 km (5.8 mi)	MPC · JPL
4570 Runcorn	1985 PR	Runcorn	August 14, 1985	Anderson Mesa	E. Bowell	slow	3.9 km (2.4 mi)	MPC · JPL
4571 Grumiaux	1985 RY_{3}	Grumiaux	September 8, 1985	La Silla	H. Debehogne	THM	15 km (9.3 mi)	MPC · JPL
4572 Brage	1986 RF	Brage	September 8, 1986	Brorfelde	P. Jensen	·	8.1 km (5.0 mi)	MPC · JPL
4573 Piešťany	1986 TP_{6}	Piešťany	October 5, 1986	Piwnice	M. Antal	EOS	15 km (9.3 mi)	MPC · JPL
4574 Yoshinaka	1986 YB	Yoshinaka	December 20, 1986	Ojima	T. Niijima, T. Urata	EOS	12 km (7.5 mi)	MPC · JPL
4575 Broman	1987 ME_{1}	Broman	June 26, 1987	Palomar	E. F. Helin	EOS	20 km (12 mi)	MPC · JPL
4576 Yanotoyohiko	1988 CC	Yanotoyohiko	February 10, 1988	Chiyoda	T. Kojima	EOS	17 km (11 mi)	MPC · JPL
4577 Chikako	1988 WG	Chikako	November 30, 1988	Yatsugatake	Y. Kushida, Inoue, M.	·	11 km (6.8 mi)	MPC · JPL
4578 Kurashiki	1988 XL_{1}	Kurashiki	December 7, 1988	Geisei	T. Seki	·	12 km (7.5 mi)	MPC · JPL
4579 Puccini	1989 AT_{6}	Puccini	January 11, 1989	Tautenburg Observatory	F. Börngen	MAS	4.5 km (2.8 mi)	MPC · JPL
4580 Child	1989 EF	Child	March 4, 1989	Palomar	E. F. Helin	EUN	10 km (6.2 mi)	MPC · JPL
4581 Asclepius	1989 FC	Asclepius	March 31, 1989	Palomar	H. E. Holt, N. G. Thomas	APO · PHA	250 m (820 ft)	MPC · JPL
4582 Hank	1989 FW	Hank	March 31, 1989	Palomar	C. S. Shoemaker	ADE	17 km (11 mi)	MPC · JPL
4583 Lugo	1989 RL_{4}	Lugo	September 1, 1989	Smolyan	Bulgarian National Observatory	·	14 km (8.7 mi)	MPC · JPL
4584 Akan	1990 FA	Akan	March 16, 1990	Kushiro	Matsuyama, M., K. Watanabe	DOR	15 km (9.3 mi)	MPC · JPL
4585 Ainonai	1990 KQ	Ainonai	May 16, 1990	Kitami	K. Endate, K. Watanabe	CLO	11 km (6.8 mi)	MPC · JPL
4586 Gunvor	6047 P-L	Gunvor	September 24, 1960	Palomar	C. J. van Houten, I. van Houten-Groeneveld, T. Gehrels	·	4.4 km (2.7 mi)	MPC · JPL
4587 Rees	3239 T-2	Rees	September 30, 1973	Palomar	C. J. van Houten, I. van Houten-Groeneveld, T. Gehrels	·	3.5 km (2.2 mi)	MPC · JPL
4588 Wislicenus	1931 EE	Wislicenus	March 13, 1931	Heidelberg	M. F. Wolf	·	14 km (8.7 mi)	MPC · JPL
4589 McDowell	1933 OB	McDowell	July 24, 1933	Heidelberg	K. Reinmuth	NYS	6.4 km (4.0 mi)	MPC · JPL
4590 Dimashchegolev	1968 OG_{1}	Dimashchegolev	July 25, 1968	Cerro El Roble	Plyugin, G. A., Yu. A. Belyaev	PHO	5.8 km (3.6 mi)	MPC · JPL
4591 Bryantsev	1975 VZ	Bryantsev	November 1, 1975	Nauchnij	T. M. Smirnova	·	6.4 km (4.0 mi)	MPC · JPL
4592 Alkissia	1979 SQ_{11}	Alkissia	September 24, 1979	Nauchnij	N. S. Chernykh	THM	14 km (8.7 mi)	MPC · JPL
4593 Reipurth	1980 FV_{1}	Reipurth	March 16, 1980	La Silla	C.-I. Lagerkvist	EOS	12 km (7.5 mi)	MPC · JPL
4594 Dashkova	1980 KR_{1}	Dashkova	May 17, 1980	Nauchnij	L. I. Chernykh	·	4.0 km (2.5 mi)	MPC · JPL
4595 Prinz	1981 EZ_{2}	Prinz	March 2, 1981	Siding Spring	S. J. Bus	·	3.8 km (2.4 mi)	MPC · JPL
4596	1981 QB	—	August 28, 1981	Palomar	C. T. Kowal	AMO +1 km (0.62 mi)	1.8 km (1.1 mi)	MPC · JPL
4597 Consolmagno	1983 UA_{1}	Consolmagno	October 30, 1983	Palomar	S. J. Bus	·	16 km (9.9 mi)	MPC · JPL
4598 Coradini	1985 PG_{1}	Coradini	August 15, 1985	Anderson Mesa	E. Bowell	EOS	11 km (6.8 mi)	MPC · JPL
4599 Rowan	1985 RZ_{2}	Rowan	September 5, 1985	La Silla	H. Debehogne	·	13 km (8.1 mi)	MPC · JPL
4600 Meadows	1985 RE_{4}	Meadows	September 10, 1985	La Silla	H. Debehogne	EOS	13 km (8.1 mi)	MPC · JPL

== 4601–4700 ==
back to top

Designation			Discovery			Properties		Ref
Permanent	Provisional	Named after	Date	Site	Discoverer(s)	Category	Diam.	Ref
4601 Ludkewycz	1986 LB	Ludkewycz	June 3, 1986	Palomar	Rudnyk, M.	EUN	9.0 km (5.6 mi)	MPC · JPL
4602 Heudier	1986 UD_{3}	Heudier	October 28, 1986	Caussols	CERGA	EUN	8.1 km (5.0 mi)	MPC · JPL
4603 Bertaud	1986 WM_{3}	Bertaud	November 25, 1986	Caussols	CERGA	slow	22 km (14 mi)	MPC · JPL
4604 Stekarstrom	1987 SK	Stekarstrom	September 18, 1987	Toyota	K. Suzuki, T. Urata	·	4.5 km (2.8 mi)	MPC · JPL
4605 Nikitin	1987 SV_{17}	Nikitin	September 18, 1987	Nauchnij	L. I. Chernykh	·	4.5 km (2.8 mi)	MPC · JPL
4606 Saheki	1987 UM_{1}	Saheki	October 27, 1987	Geisei	T. Seki	·	6.7 km (4.2 mi)	MPC · JPL
4607 Seilandfarm	1987 WR	Seilandfarm	November 25, 1987	Kitami	K. Endate, K. Watanabe	moon	7.4 km (4.6 mi)	MPC · JPL
4608 Wodehouse	1988 BW_{3}	Wodehouse	January 19, 1988	La Silla	H. Debehogne	·	7.6 km (4.7 mi)	MPC · JPL
4609 Pizarro	1988 CT_{3}	Pizarro	February 13, 1988	La Silla	E. W. Elst	·	29 km (18 mi)	MPC · JPL
4610 Kájov	1989 FO	Kájov	March 26, 1989	Kleť	A. Mrkos	·	9.9 km (6.2 mi)	MPC · JPL
4611 Vulkaneifel	1989 GR_{6}	Vulkaneifel	April 5, 1989	La Silla	Geffert, M.	EUN	11 km (6.8 mi)	MPC · JPL
4612 Greenstein	1989 JG	Greenstein	May 2, 1989	Palomar	E. F. Helin	·	7.7 km (4.8 mi)	MPC · JPL
4613 Mamoru	1990 OM	Mamoru	July 22, 1990	JCPM Sapporo	K. Watanabe	·	11 km (6.8 mi)	MPC · JPL
4614 Masamura	1990 QN	Masamura	August 21, 1990	Kani	Y. Mizuno, T. Furuta	slow	6.1 km (3.8 mi)	MPC · JPL
4615 Zinner	A923 RH	Zinner	September 13, 1923	Heidelberg	K. Reinmuth	·	11 km (6.8 mi)	MPC · JPL
4616 Batalov	1975 BF	Batalov	January 17, 1975	Nauchnij	L. I. Chernykh	THM	14 km (8.7 mi)	MPC · JPL
4617 Zadunaisky	1976 DK	Zadunaisky	February 22, 1976	El Leoncito	Félix Aguilar Observatory	·	33 km (21 mi)	MPC · JPL
4618 Shakhovskoj	1977 RJ_{3}	Shakhovskoj	September 12, 1977	Nauchnij	N. S. Chernykh	·	9.9 km (6.2 mi)	MPC · JPL
4619 Polyakhova	1977 RB_{7}	Polyakhova	September 11, 1977	Nauchnij	N. S. Chernykh	·	9.1 km (5.7 mi)	MPC · JPL
4620 Bickley	1978 OK	Bickley	July 28, 1978	Bickley	Perth Observatory	·	3.8 km (2.4 mi)	MPC · JPL
4621 Tambov	1979 QE_{10}	Tambov	August 27, 1979	Nauchnij	N. S. Chernykh	·	5.7 km (3.5 mi)	MPC · JPL
4622 Solovjova	1979 WE_{2}	Solovjova	November 16, 1979	Nauchnij	L. I. Chernykh	·	12 km (7.5 mi)	MPC · JPL
4623 Obraztsova	1981 UT_{15}	Obraztsova	October 24, 1981	Nauchnij	L. I. Chernykh	KOR	9.7 km (6.0 mi)	MPC · JPL
4624 Stefani	1982 FV_{2}	Stefani	March 23, 1982	Palomar	C. S. Shoemaker	·	14 km (8.7 mi)	MPC · JPL
4625 Shchedrin	1982 UG_{6}	Shchedrin	October 20, 1982	Nauchnij	L. G. Karachkina	·	6.5 km (4.0 mi)	MPC · JPL
4626 Plisetskaya	1984 YU_{1}	Plisetskaya	December 23, 1984	Nauchnij	L. G. Karachkina	·	4.7 km (2.9 mi)	MPC · JPL
4627 Pinomogavero	1985 RT_{2}	Pinomogavero	September 5, 1985	La Silla	H. Debehogne	KOR	10 km (6.2 mi)	MPC · JPL
4628 Laplace	1986 RU_{4}	Laplace	September 7, 1986	Smolyan	E. W. Elst	EUN ·	19 km (12 mi)	MPC · JPL
4629 Walford	1986 TD_{7}	Walford	October 7, 1986	Palomar	E. F. Helin	ADE ·	9.7 km (6.0 mi)	MPC · JPL
4630 Chaonis	1987 WA	Chaonis	November 18, 1987	Chions	J. M. Baur	·	7.5 km (4.7 mi)	MPC · JPL
4631 Yabu	1987 WE_{1}	Yabu	November 22, 1987	Kushiro	S. Ueda, H. Kaneda	·	5.5 km (3.4 mi)	MPC · JPL
4632 Udagawa	1987 YB	Udagawa	December 17, 1987	Chiyoda	T. Kojima	·	5.3 km (3.3 mi)	MPC · JPL
4633 Marinbica	1988 AJ_{5}	Marinbica	January 14, 1988	La Silla	H. Debehogne	THM	13 km (8.1 mi)	MPC · JPL
4634 Shibuya	1988 BA	Shibuya	January 16, 1988	Kobuchizawa	Inoue, M., O. Muramatsu	·	6.4 km (4.0 mi)	MPC · JPL
4635 Rimbaud	1988 BJ_{1}	Rimbaud	January 21, 1988	Haute-Provence	E. W. Elst	slow	10 km (6.2 mi)	MPC · JPL
4636 Chile	1988 CJ_{5}	Chile	February 13, 1988	La Silla	E. W. Elst	EUN	6.8 km (4.2 mi)	MPC · JPL
4637 Odorico	1989 CT	Odorico	February 8, 1989	Chions	J. M. Baur	NYS	6.3 km (3.9 mi)	MPC · JPL
4638 Estens	1989 EG	Estens	March 2, 1989	Siding Spring	R. H. McNaught	·	4.6 km (2.9 mi)	MPC · JPL
4639 Minox	1989 EK_{2}	Minox	March 5, 1989	Geisei	T. Seki	RAF	6.9 km (4.3 mi)	MPC · JPL
4640 Hara	1989 GA	Hara	April 1, 1989	Yatsugatake	Y. Kushida, O. Muramatsu	·	6.1 km (3.8 mi)	MPC · JPL
4641 Ayako	1990 QT_{3}	Ayako	August 30, 1990	Kitami	K. Endate, K. Watanabe	·	3.5 km (2.2 mi)	MPC · JPL
4642 Murchie	1990 QG_{4}	Murchie	August 23, 1990	Palomar	H. E. Holt	THM	17 km (11 mi)	MPC · JPL
4643 Cisneros	1990 QD_{6}	Cisneros	August 23, 1990	Palomar	H. E. Holt	·	5.7 km (3.5 mi)	MPC · JPL
4644 Oumu	1990 SR_{3}	Oumu	September 16, 1990	Kitami	A. Takahashi, K. Watanabe	EUN	7.5 km (4.7 mi)	MPC · JPL
4645 Tentaikojo	1990 SP_{4}	Tentaikojo	September 16, 1990	Kitami	T. Fujii, K. Watanabe	·	17 km (11 mi)	MPC · JPL
4646 Kwee	4009 P-L	Kwee	September 24, 1960	Palomar	C. J. van Houten, I. van Houten-Groeneveld, T. Gehrels	NYS	5.3 km (3.3 mi)	MPC · JPL
4647 Syuji	1931 TU_{1}	Syuji	October 9, 1931	Heidelberg	K. Reinmuth	·	14 km (8.7 mi)	MPC · JPL
4648 Tirion	1931 UE	Tirion	October 18, 1931	Heidelberg	K. Reinmuth	·	10 km (6.2 mi)	MPC · JPL
4649 Sumoto	1936 YD	Sumoto	December 20, 1936	Nice	M. Laugier	·	15 km (9.3 mi)	MPC · JPL
4650 Mori	1950 TF	Mori	October 5, 1950	Heidelberg	K. Reinmuth	·	5.0 km (3.1 mi)	MPC · JPL
4651 Wongkwancheng	1957 UK_{1}	Wongkwancheng	October 31, 1957	Nanking	Purple Mountain	KOR	7.9 km (4.9 mi)	MPC · JPL
4652 Iannini	1975 QO	Iannini	August 30, 1975	El Leoncito	Félix Aguilar Observatory	(1547)	6.3 km (3.9 mi)	MPC · JPL
4653 Tommaso	1976 GJ_{2}	Tommaso	April 1, 1976	Nauchnij	N. S. Chernykh	·	7.8 km (4.8 mi)	MPC · JPL
4654 Gorʹkavyj	1977 RJ_{6}	Gorʹkavyj	September 11, 1977	Nauchnij	N. S. Chernykh	·	4.5 km (2.8 mi)	MPC · JPL
4655 Marjoriika	1978 RS	Marjoriika	September 1, 1978	Nauchnij	N. S. Chernykh	·	5.3 km (3.3 mi)	MPC · JPL
4656 Huchra	1978 VZ_{3}	Huchra	November 7, 1978	Palomar	E. F. Helin, S. J. Bus	KOR	6.9 km (4.3 mi)	MPC · JPL
4657 Lopez	1979 SU_{9}	Lopez	September 22, 1979	Nauchnij	N. S. Chernykh	THM	16 km (9.9 mi)	MPC · JPL
4658 Gavrilov	1979 SO_{11}	Gavrilov	September 24, 1979	Nauchnij	N. S. Chernykh	·	12 km (7.5 mi)	MPC · JPL
4659 Roddenberry	1981 EP_{20}	Roddenberry	March 2, 1981	Siding Spring	S. J. Bus	NYS	3.6 km (2.2 mi)	MPC · JPL
4660 Nereus	1982 DB	Nereus	February 28, 1982	Palomar	E. F. Helin	APO · PHA	330 m (1,080 ft)	MPC · JPL
4661 Yebes	1982 WM	Yebes	November 17, 1982	Yebes	de Pascual, M.	·	6.0 km (3.7 mi)	MPC · JPL
4662 Runk	1984 HL	Runk	April 19, 1984	Kleť	A. Mrkos	·	17 km (11 mi)	MPC · JPL
4663 Falta	1984 SM_{1}	Falta	September 27, 1984	Kleť	A. Mrkos	·	29 km (18 mi)	MPC · JPL
4664 Hanner	1985 PJ	Hanner	August 14, 1985	Anderson Mesa	E. Bowell	KOR	10 km (6.2 mi)	MPC · JPL
4665 Muinonen	1985 TZ_{1}	Muinonen	October 15, 1985	Anderson Mesa	E. Bowell	·	10 km (6.2 mi)	MPC · JPL
4666 Dietz	1986 JA_{1}	Dietz	May 4, 1986	Palomar	C. S. Shoemaker	PHO · moon	6.8 km (4.2 mi)	MPC · JPL
4667 Robbiesh	1986 VC	Robbiesh	November 4, 1986	Siding Spring	R. H. McNaught	·	6.9 km (4.3 mi)	MPC · JPL
4668 Rayjay	1987 DX_{5}	Rayjay	February 21, 1987	La Silla	H. Debehogne	EOS	14 km (8.7 mi)	MPC · JPL
4669 Høder	1987 UF_{1}	Høder	October 27, 1987	Brorfelde	P. Jensen	·	3.9 km (2.4 mi)	MPC · JPL
4670 Yoshinogawa	1987 YJ	Yoshinogawa	December 19, 1987	Geisei	T. Seki	·	4.4 km (2.7 mi)	MPC · JPL
4671 Drtikol	1988 AK_{1}	Drtikol	January 10, 1988	Kleť	A. Mrkos	·	6.2 km (3.9 mi)	MPC · JPL
4672 Takuboku	1988 HB	Takuboku	April 17, 1988	Kushiro	S. Ueda, H. Kaneda	·	28 km (17 mi)	MPC · JPL
4673 Bortle	1988 LF	Bortle	June 8, 1988	Palomar	C. S. Shoemaker	MAR	11 km (6.8 mi)	MPC · JPL
4674 Pauling	1989 JC	Pauling	May 2, 1989	Palomar	E. F. Helin	H · moon	4.8 km (3.0 mi)	MPC · JPL
4675 Ohboke	1990 SD	Ohboke	September 19, 1990	Geisei	T. Seki	·	4.0 km (2.5 mi)	MPC · JPL
4676 Uedaseiji	1990 SD_{4}	Uedaseiji	September 16, 1990	Kitami	T. Fujii, K. Watanabe	·	8.0 km (5.0 mi)	MPC · JPL
4677 Hiroshi	1990 SQ_{4}	Hiroshi	September 26, 1990	Kitami	A. Takahashi, K. Watanabe	THM	14 km (8.7 mi)	MPC · JPL
4678 Ninian	1990 SS_{4}	Ninian	September 24, 1990	Siding Spring	R. H. McNaught	·	5.0 km (3.1 mi)	MPC · JPL
4679 Sybil	1990 TR_{4}	Sybil	October 9, 1990	Siding Spring	R. H. McNaught	·	12 km (7.5 mi)	MPC · JPL
4680 Lohrmann	1937 QC	Lohrmann	August 31, 1937	Hamburg-Bergedorf	H.-U. Sandig	·	5.0 km (3.1 mi)	MPC · JPL
4681 Ermak	1969 TC_{2}	Ermak	October 8, 1969	Nauchnij	L. I. Chernykh	EOS	12 km (7.5 mi)	MPC · JPL
4682 Bykov	1973 SO_{4}	Bykov	September 27, 1973	Nauchnij	L. I. Chernykh	·	3.9 km (2.4 mi)	MPC · JPL
4683 Veratar	1976 GJ_{1}	Veratar	April 1, 1976	Nauchnij	N. S. Chernykh	THM	17 km (11 mi)	MPC · JPL
4684 Bendjoya	1978 GJ	Bendjoya	April 10, 1978	La Silla	H. Debehogne	·	5.2 km (3.2 mi)	MPC · JPL
4685 Karetnikov	1978 SP_{6}	Karetnikov	September 27, 1978	Nauchnij	N. S. Chernykh	THM	19 km (12 mi)	MPC · JPL
4686 Maisica	1979 SX_{2}	Maisica	September 22, 1979	Nauchnij	N. S. Chernykh	·	3.5 km (2.2 mi)	MPC · JPL
4687 Brunsandrej	1979 SJ_{11}	Brunsandrej	September 24, 1979	Nauchnij	N. S. Chernykh	HYG	12 km (7.5 mi)	MPC · JPL
4688	1980 WF	—	November 29, 1980	Palomar	C. T. Kowal	AMO	600 m (2,000 ft)	MPC · JPL
4689 Donn	1980 YB	Donn	December 30, 1980	Anderson Mesa	E. Bowell	slow	6.1 km (3.8 mi)	MPC · JPL
4690 Strasbourg	1983 AJ	Strasbourg	January 9, 1983	Anderson Mesa	B. A. Skiff	H	3.2 km (2.0 mi)	MPC · JPL
4691 Toyen	1983 TU	Toyen	October 7, 1983	Kleť	A. Mrkos	(2076)	7.1 km (4.4 mi)	MPC · JPL
4692 SIMBAD	1983 VM_{7}	SIMBAD	November 4, 1983	Anderson Mesa	B. A. Skiff	·	4.9 km (3.0 mi)	MPC · JPL
4693 Drummond	1983 WH	Drummond	November 28, 1983	Anderson Mesa	E. Bowell	·	4.8 km (3.0 mi)	MPC · JPL
4694 Festou	1985 PM	Festou	August 14, 1985	Anderson Mesa	E. Bowell	·	7.7 km (4.8 mi)	MPC · JPL
4695 Mediolanum	1985 RU_{3}	Mediolanum	September 7, 1985	La Silla	H. Debehogne	EUN	10 km (6.2 mi)	MPC · JPL
4696 Arpigny	1985 TP	Arpigny	October 15, 1985	Anderson Mesa	E. Bowell	KOR	10 km (6.2 mi)	MPC · JPL
4697 Novara	1986 QO	Novara	August 26, 1986	La Silla	H. Debehogne	NYS	7.8 km (4.8 mi)	MPC · JPL
4698 Jizera	1986 RO_{1}	Jizera	September 4, 1986	Kleť	A. Mrkos	·	4.4 km (2.7 mi)	MPC · JPL
4699 Sootan	1986 VE	Sootan	November 4, 1986	Siding Spring	R. H. McNaught	EUN	4.2 km (2.6 mi)	MPC · JPL
4700 Carusi	1986 VV_{6}	Carusi	November 6, 1986	Anderson Mesa	E. Bowell	(5)	7.8 km (4.8 mi)	MPC · JPL

== 4701–4800 ==
back to top

Designation			Discovery			Properties		Ref
Permanent	Provisional	Named after	Date	Site	Discoverer(s)	Category	Diam.	Ref
4701 Milani	1986 VW_{6}	Milani	November 6, 1986	Anderson Mesa	E. Bowell	·	14 km (8.7 mi)	MPC · JPL
4702 Berounka	1987 HW	Berounka	April 23, 1987	Kleť	A. Mrkos	GEF	8.5 km (5.3 mi)	MPC · JPL
4703 Kagoshima	1988 BL	Kagoshima	January 16, 1988	Kagoshima	M. Mukai, Takeishi, M.	·	4.3 km (2.7 mi)	MPC · JPL
4704 Sheena	1988 BE_{5}	Sheena	January 28, 1988	Siding Spring	R. H. McNaught	EUN	5.1 km (3.2 mi)	MPC · JPL
4705 Secchi	1988 CK	Secchi	February 13, 1988	Bologna	San Vittore	·	5.6 km (3.5 mi)	MPC · JPL
4706 Dennisreuter	1988 DR	Dennisreuter	February 16, 1988	Kavalur	Rajamohan, R.	·	5.6 km (3.5 mi)	MPC · JPL
4707 Khryses	1988 PY	Khryses	August 13, 1988	Palomar	C. S. Shoemaker	L5	38 km (24 mi)	MPC · JPL
4708 Polydoros	1988 RT	Polydoros	September 11, 1988	Palomar	C. S. Shoemaker	L5	55 km (34 mi)	MPC · JPL
4709 Ennomos	1988 TU_{2}	Ennomos	October 12, 1988	Palomar	C. S. Shoemaker	L5	91 km (57 mi)	MPC · JPL
4710 Wade	1989 AX_{2}	Wade	January 4, 1989	Siding Spring	R. H. McNaught	(883)	6.6 km (4.1 mi)	MPC · JPL
4711 Kathy	1989 KD	Kathy	May 31, 1989	Palomar	H. E. Holt	·	8.2 km (5.1 mi)	MPC · JPL
4712 Iwaizumi	1989 QE	Iwaizumi	August 25, 1989	Kitami	K. Endate, K. Watanabe	·	29 km (18 mi)	MPC · JPL
4713 Steel	1989 QL	Steel	August 26, 1989	Siding Spring	R. H. McNaught	H	6.3 km (3.9 mi)	MPC · JPL
4714 Toyohiro	1989 SH	Toyohiro	September 29, 1989	Kitami	T. Fujii, K. Watanabe	EOS	19 km (12 mi)	MPC · JPL
4715 Medesicaste	1989 TS_{1}	Medesicaste	October 9, 1989	Gekko	Y. Oshima	L5	62 km (39 mi)	MPC · JPL
4716 Urey	1989 UL_{5}	Urey	October 30, 1989	Cerro Tololo	S. J. Bus	·	15 km (9.3 mi)	MPC · JPL
4717 Kaneko	1989 WX	Kaneko	November 20, 1989	Kani	Y. Mizuno, T. Furuta	EOS	18 km (11 mi)	MPC · JPL
4718 Araki	1990 VP_{3}	Araki	November 13, 1990	Kitami	T. Fujii, K. Watanabe	·	5.9 km (3.7 mi)	MPC · JPL
4719 Burnaby	1990 WT_{2}	Burnaby	November 21, 1990	Kushiro	S. Ueda, H. Kaneda	·	10 km (6.2 mi)	MPC · JPL
4720 Tottori	1990 YG	Tottori	December 19, 1990	Kushiro	S. Ueda, H. Kaneda	·	6.0 km (3.7 mi)	MPC · JPL
4721 Atahualpa	4239 T-2	Atahualpa	September 29, 1973	Palomar	C. J. van Houten, I. van Houten-Groeneveld, T. Gehrels	·	4.6 km (2.9 mi)	MPC · JPL
4722 Agelaos	4271 T-3	Agelaos	October 16, 1977	Palomar	C. J. van Houten, I. van Houten-Groeneveld, T. Gehrels	L5	50 km (31 mi)	MPC · JPL
4723 Wolfgangmattig	1937 TB	Wolfgangmattig	October 11, 1937	Heidelberg	K. Reinmuth	·	10 km (6.2 mi)	MPC · JPL
4724 Brocken	1961 BC	Brocken	January 18, 1961	Tautenburg Observatory	C. Hoffmeister, J. Schubart	·	6.5 km (4.0 mi)	MPC · JPL
4725 Milone	1975 YE	Milone	December 31, 1975	El Leoncito	Félix Aguilar Observatory	·	10 km (6.2 mi)	MPC · JPL
4726 Federer	1976 SV_{10}	Federer	September 25, 1976	Harvard Observatory	Harvard Observatory	·	8.3 km (5.2 mi)	MPC · JPL
4727 Ravel	1979 UD_{1}	Ravel	October 24, 1979	Tautenburg Observatory	F. Börngen	KOR	7.2 km (4.5 mi)	MPC · JPL
4728 Lyapidevskij	1979 VG	Lyapidevskij	November 11, 1979	Nauchnij	N. S. Chernykh	·	4.0 km (2.5 mi)	MPC · JPL
4729 Mikhailmilʹ	1980 RO_{2}	Mikhailmilʹ	September 8, 1980	Nauchnij	L. V. Zhuravleva	·	6.0 km (3.7 mi)	MPC · JPL
4730 Xingmingzhou	1980 XZ	Xingmingzhou	December 7, 1980	Nanking	Purple Mountain	EOS ·	25 km (16 mi)	MPC · JPL
4731 Monicagrady	1981 EE_{9}	Monicagrady	March 1, 1981	Siding Spring	S. J. Bus	·	10 km (6.2 mi)	MPC · JPL
4732 Froeschlé	1981 JG	Froeschlé	May 3, 1981	Anderson Mesa	E. Bowell	·	30 km (19 mi)	MPC · JPL
4733 ORO	1982 HB_{2}	ORO	April 19, 1982	Harvard Observatory	Oak Ridge Observatory	·	4.7 km (2.9 mi)	MPC · JPL
4734 Rameau	1982 UQ_{3}	Rameau	October 19, 1982	Tautenburg Observatory	F. Börngen	MAS	3.0 km (1.9 mi)	MPC · JPL
4735 Gary	1983 AN	Gary	January 9, 1983	Anderson Mesa	E. Bowell	·	5.1 km (3.2 mi)	MPC · JPL
4736 Johnwood	1983 AF_{2}	Johnwood	January 13, 1983	Palomar	C. S. Shoemaker	H	2.8 km (1.7 mi)	MPC · JPL
4737 Kiladze	1985 QO_{6}	Kiladze	August 24, 1985	Nauchnij	N. S. Chernykh	·	8.8 km (5.5 mi)	MPC · JPL
4738 Jimihendrix	1985 RZ_{4}	Jimihendrix	September 15, 1985	Palomar	Goldstein, D. B.	EUN	8.2 km (5.1 mi)	MPC · JPL
4739 Tomahrens	1985 TH_{1}	Tomahrens	October 15, 1985	Anderson Mesa	E. Bowell	·	7.0 km (4.3 mi)	MPC · JPL
4740 Veniamina	1985 UV_{4}	Veniamina	October 22, 1985	Nauchnij	L. V. Zhuravleva	·	11 km (6.8 mi)	MPC · JPL
4741 Leskov	1985 VP_{3}	Leskov	November 10, 1985	Nauchnij	L. G. Karachkina	THM	17 km (11 mi)	MPC · JPL
4742 Caliumi	1986 WG	Caliumi	November 26, 1986	Bologna	San Vittore	PHO	6.6 km (4.1 mi)	MPC · JPL
4743 Kikuchi	1988 DA	Kikuchi	February 16, 1988	Kitami	T. Fujii, K. Watanabe	·	4.1 km (2.5 mi)	MPC · JPL
4744 Rovereto	1988 RF_{5}	Rovereto	September 2, 1988	La Silla	H. Debehogne	·	19 km (12 mi)	MPC · JPL
4745 Nancymarie	1989 NG_{1}	Nancymarie	July 9, 1989	Palomar	H. E. Holt	EOS	13 km (8.1 mi)	MPC · JPL
4746 Doi	1989 TP_{1}	Doi	October 9, 1989	Kitami	A. Takahashi, K. Watanabe	THM	22 km (14 mi)	MPC · JPL
4747 Jujo	1989 WB	Jujo	November 19, 1989	Kushiro	S. Ueda, H. Kaneda	EOS	14 km (8.7 mi)	MPC · JPL
4748 Tokiwagozen	1989 WV	Tokiwagozen	November 20, 1989	Toyota	K. Suzuki, T. Urata	·	12 km (7.5 mi)	MPC · JPL
4749 Ledzeppelin	1989 WE_{1}	Ledzeppelin	November 22, 1989	Uenohara	N. Kawasato	EOS	14 km (8.7 mi)	MPC · JPL
4750 Mukai	1990 XC_{1}	Mukai	December 15, 1990	Kitami	T. Fujii, K. Watanabe	·	8.7 km (5.4 mi)	MPC · JPL
4751 Alicemanning	1991 BG	Alicemanning	January 17, 1991	Stakenbridge	B. G. W. Manning	·	18 km (11 mi)	MPC · JPL
4752 Myron	1309 T-2	Myron	September 29, 1973	Palomar	C. J. van Houten, I. van Houten-Groeneveld, T. Gehrels	THM	12 km (7.5 mi)	MPC · JPL
4753 Phidias	4059 T-3	Phidias	October 16, 1977	Palomar	C. J. van Houten, I. van Houten-Groeneveld, T. Gehrels	·	7.8 km (4.8 mi)	MPC · JPL
4754 Panthoos	5010 T-3	Panthoos	October 16, 1977	Palomar	C. J. van Houten, I. van Houten-Groeneveld, T. Gehrels	L5	53 km (33 mi)	MPC · JPL
4755 Nicky	1931 TE_{4}	Nicky	October 6, 1931	Flagstaff	C. W. Tombaugh	·	3.9 km (2.4 mi)	MPC · JPL
4756 Asaramas	1950 HJ	Asaramas	April 21, 1950	La Plata Observatory	La Plata	EOS	12 km (7.5 mi)	MPC · JPL
4757 Liselotte	1973 ST	Liselotte	September 19, 1973	Palomar	C. J. van Houten, I. van Houten-Groeneveld, T. Gehrels	3:2	20 km (12 mi)	MPC · JPL
4758 Hermitage	1978 SN_{4}	Hermitage	September 27, 1978	Nauchnij	L. I. Chernykh	THM	19 km (12 mi)	MPC · JPL
4759 Åretta	1978 VG_{10}	Åretta	November 7, 1978	Palomar	E. F. Helin, S. J. Bus	THM	16 km (9.9 mi)	MPC · JPL
4760 Jia-xiang	1981 GN_{1}	Jia-xiang	April 1, 1981	Harvard Observatory	Harvard Observatory	·	5.1 km (3.2 mi)	MPC · JPL
4761 Urrutia	1981 QC	Urrutia	August 27, 1981	La Silla	H.-E. Schuster	PHO	3.7 km (2.3 mi)	MPC · JPL
4762 Dobrynya	1982 SC_{6}	Dobrynya	September 16, 1982	Nauchnij	L. I. Chernykh	·	5.9 km (3.7 mi)	MPC · JPL
4763 Ride	1983 BM	Ride	January 22, 1983	Anderson Mesa	E. Bowell	EUN	10 km (6.2 mi)	MPC · JPL
4764 Joneberhart	1983 CC	Joneberhart	February 11, 1983	Anderson Mesa	E. Bowell	H	2.8 km (1.7 mi)	MPC · JPL
4765 Wasserburg	1986 JN_{1}	Wasserburg	May 5, 1986	Palomar	C. S. Shoemaker	H · moon	1.8 km (1.1 mi)	MPC · JPL
4766 Malin	1987 FF_{1}	Malin	March 28, 1987	Palomar	E. F. Helin	EUN	7.4 km (4.6 mi)	MPC · JPL
4767 Sutoku	1987 GC	Sutoku	April 4, 1987	Ojima	T. Niijima, T. Urata	EUN	7.9 km (4.9 mi)	MPC · JPL
4768 Hartley	1988 PH_{1}	Hartley	August 11, 1988	Siding Spring	Noymer, A. J.	·	34 km (21 mi)	MPC · JPL
4769 Castalia	1989 PB	Castalia	August 9, 1989	Palomar	E. F. Helin	APO +1 km (0.62 mi) · PHA	1.4 km (0.87 mi)	MPC · JPL
4770 Lane	1989 PC	Lane	August 9, 1989	Palomar	E. F. Helin	·	9.9 km (6.2 mi)	MPC · JPL
4771 Hayashi	1989 RM_{2}	Hayashi	September 7, 1989	Kitami	M. Yanai, K. Watanabe	·	13 km (8.1 mi)	MPC · JPL
4772 Frankdrake	1989 VM	Frankdrake	November 2, 1989	Okutama	Hioki, T., N. Kawasato	·	28 km (17 mi)	MPC · JPL
4773 Hayakawa	1989 WF	Hayakawa	November 17, 1989	Kitami	K. Endate, K. Watanabe	(5)	6.2 km (3.9 mi)	MPC · JPL
4774 Hobetsu	1991 CV_{1}	Hobetsu	February 14, 1991	Kushiro	S. Ueda, H. Kaneda	·	5.0 km (3.1 mi)	MPC · JPL
4775 Hansen	1927 TC	Hansen	October 3, 1927	Heidelberg	M. F. Wolf	·	7.1 km (4.4 mi)	MPC · JPL
4776 Luyi	1975 VD	Luyi	November 3, 1975	Harvard Observatory	Harvard Observatory	·	3.6 km (2.2 mi)	MPC · JPL
4777 Aksenov	1976 SM_{2}	Aksenov	September 24, 1976	Nauchnij	N. S. Chernykh	·	3.9 km (2.4 mi)	MPC · JPL
4778 Fuss	1978 TV_{8}	Fuss	October 9, 1978	Nauchnij	L. V. Zhuravleva	THM	13 km (8.1 mi)	MPC · JPL
4779 Whitley	1978 XQ	Whitley	December 6, 1978	Palomar	E. Bowell, Warnock, A.	THM	15 km (9.3 mi)	MPC · JPL
4780 Polina	1979 HE_{5}	Polina	April 25, 1979	Nauchnij	N. S. Chernykh	·	3.6 km (2.2 mi)	MPC · JPL
4781 Sládkovič	1980 TP	Sládkovič	October 3, 1980	Kleť	Z. Vávrová	·	3.9 km (2.4 mi)	MPC · JPL
4782 Gembloux	1980 TH_{3}	Gembloux	October 14, 1980	Haute-Provence	H. Debehogne, L. Houziaux	KOR ·	12 km (7.5 mi)	MPC · JPL
4783 Wasson	1983 AH_{1}	Wasson	January 12, 1983	Palomar	C. S. Shoemaker	·	7.2 km (4.5 mi)	MPC · JPL
4784 Samcarin	1984 DF_{1}	Samcarin	February 28, 1984	La Silla	H. Debehogne	·	6.0 km (3.7 mi)	MPC · JPL
4785 Petrov	1984 YH_{1}	Petrov	December 17, 1984	Nauchnij	L. G. Karachkina	·	8.3 km (5.2 mi)	MPC · JPL
4786 Tatianina	1985 PE_{2}	Tatianina	August 13, 1985	Nauchnij	N. S. Chernykh	moon	3.3 km (2.1 mi)	MPC · JPL
4787 Shulʹzhenko	1986 RC_{7}	Shulʹzhenko	September 6, 1986	Nauchnij	L. V. Zhuravleva	·	5.0 km (3.1 mi)	MPC · JPL
4788 Simpson	1986 TL_{1}	Simpson	October 4, 1986	Anderson Mesa	E. Bowell	moon	3.6 km (2.2 mi)	MPC · JPL
4789 Sprattia	1987 UU_{2}	Sprattia	October 20, 1987	Climenhaga	D. D. Balam	·	4.2 km (2.6 mi)	MPC · JPL
4790 Petrpravec	1988 PP	Petrpravec	August 9, 1988	Palomar	E. F. Helin	slow	16 km (9.9 mi)	MPC · JPL
4791 Iphidamas	1988 PB_{1}	Iphidamas	August 14, 1988	Palomar	C. S. Shoemaker	L5	50 km (31 mi)	MPC · JPL
4792 Lykaon	1988 RK_{1}	Lykaon	September 10, 1988	Palomar	C. S. Shoemaker	L5	51 km (32 mi)	MPC · JPL
4793 Slessor	1988 RR_{4}	Slessor	September 1, 1988	La Silla	H. Debehogne	LEO	13 km (8.1 mi)	MPC · JPL
4794 Bogard	1988 SO_{2}	Bogard	September 16, 1988	Cerro Tololo	S. J. Bus	·	4.4 km (2.7 mi)	MPC · JPL
4795 Kihara	1989 CB_{1}	Kihara	February 7, 1989	Kitami	A. Takahashi, K. Watanabe	·	4.1 km (2.5 mi)	MPC · JPL
4796 Lewis	1989 LU	Lewis	June 3, 1989	Palomar	E. F. Helin	·	7.3 km (4.5 mi)	MPC · JPL
4797 Ako	1989 SJ	Ako	September 30, 1989	Minami-Oda	T. Nomura, K. Kawanishi	NYS	6.0 km (3.7 mi)	MPC · JPL
4798 Mercator	1989 SU_{1}	Mercator	September 26, 1989	La Silla	E. W. Elst	·	5.0 km (3.1 mi)	MPC · JPL
4799 Hirasawa	1989 TC_{1}	Hirasawa	October 8, 1989	Kani	Y. Mizuno, T. Furuta	·	7.9 km (4.9 mi)	MPC · JPL
4800 Veveri	1989 TG_{17}	Veveri	October 9, 1989	La Silla	H. Debehogne	EOS	14 km (8.7 mi)	MPC · JPL

== 4801–4900 ==
back to top

Designation			Discovery			Properties		Ref
Permanent	Provisional	Named after	Date	Site	Discoverer(s)	Category	Diam.	Ref
4801 Ohře	1989 UR_{4}	Ohře	October 22, 1989	Kleť	A. Mrkos	·	14 km (8.7 mi)	MPC · JPL
4802 Khatchaturian	1989 UA_{7}	Khatchaturian	October 23, 1989	Tautenburg Observatory	F. Börngen	·	2.3 km (1.4 mi)	MPC · JPL
4803 Birkle	1989 XA	Birkle	December 1, 1989	Chions	J. M. Baur	KOR	10 km (6.2 mi)	MPC · JPL
4804 Pasteur	1989 XC_{1}	Pasteur	December 2, 1989	La Silla	E. W. Elst	·	15 km (9.3 mi)	MPC · JPL
4805 Asteropaios	1990 VH_{7}	Asteropaios	November 13, 1990	Palomar	C. S. Shoemaker	L5	58 km (36 mi)	MPC · JPL
4806 Miho	1990 YJ	Miho	December 22, 1990	Yakiimo	Natori, A., T. Urata	·	5.7 km (3.5 mi)	MPC · JPL
4807 Noboru	1991 AO	Noboru	January 10, 1991	Oizumi	T. Kobayashi	·	4.7 km (2.9 mi)	MPC · JPL
4808 Ballaero	1925 BA	Ballaero	January 21, 1925	Heidelberg	K. Reinmuth	ADE	19 km (12 mi)	MPC · JPL
4809 Robertball	1928 RB	Robertball	September 5, 1928	Heidelberg	M. F. Wolf	·	6.4 km (4.0 mi)	MPC · JPL
4810 Ruslanova	1972 GL	Ruslanova	April 14, 1972	Nauchnij	L. I. Chernykh	·	6.3 km (3.9 mi)	MPC · JPL
4811 Semashko	1973 SO_{3}	Semashko	September 25, 1973	Nauchnij	L. V. Zhuravleva	·	3.8 km (2.4 mi)	MPC · JPL
4812 Hakuhou	1977 DL_{3}	Hakuhou	February 18, 1977	Kiso	H. Kosai, K. Furukawa	ERI	6.8 km (4.2 mi)	MPC · JPL
4813 Terebizh	1977 RR_{7}	Terebizh	September 11, 1977	Nauchnij	N. S. Chernykh	·	18 km (11 mi)	MPC · JPL
4814 Casacci	1978 RW	Casacci	September 1, 1978	Nauchnij	N. S. Chernykh	·	14 km (8.7 mi)	MPC · JPL
4815 Anders	1981 EA_{28}	Anders	March 2, 1981	Siding Spring	S. J. Bus	V	4.2 km (2.6 mi)	MPC · JPL
4816 Connelly	1981 PK	Connelly	August 3, 1981	Anderson Mesa	E. Bowell	·	7.2 km (4.5 mi)	MPC · JPL
4817 Gliba	1984 DC_{1}	Gliba	February 27, 1984	La Silla	H. Debehogne	NYS	3.8 km (2.4 mi)	MPC · JPL
4818 Elgar	1984 EM	Elgar	March 1, 1984	Anderson Mesa	E. Bowell	·	5.0 km (3.1 mi)	MPC · JPL
4819 Gifford	1985 KC	Gifford	May 24, 1985	Lake Tekapo	A. C. Gilmore, P. M. Kilmartin	slow	3.8 km (2.4 mi)	MPC · JPL
4820 Fay	1985 RZ	Fay	September 15, 1985	Palomar	C. S. Shoemaker	·	8.6 km (5.3 mi)	MPC · JPL
4821 Bianucci	1986 EE_{5}	Bianucci	March 5, 1986	La Silla	W. Ferreri	·	15 km (9.3 mi)	MPC · JPL
4822 Karge	1986 TC_{1}	Karge	October 4, 1986	Anderson Mesa	E. Bowell	·	4.3 km (2.7 mi)	MPC · JPL
4823 Libenice	1986 TO_{3}	Libenice	October 4, 1986	Kleť	A. Mrkos	·	4.1 km (2.5 mi)	MPC · JPL
4824 Stradonice	1986 WL_{1}	Stradonice	November 25, 1986	Kleť	A. Mrkos	·	4.1 km (2.5 mi)	MPC · JPL
4825 Ventura	1988 CS_{2}	Ventura	February 11, 1988	La Silla	E. W. Elst	·	3.8 km (2.4 mi)	MPC · JPL
4826 Wilhelms	1988 JO	Wilhelms	May 11, 1988	Palomar	C. S. Shoemaker	PHO	7.9 km (4.9 mi)	MPC · JPL
4827 Dares	1988 QE	Dares	August 17, 1988	Palomar	C. S. Shoemaker	L5	43 km (27 mi)	MPC · JPL
4828 Misenus	1988 RV	Misenus	September 11, 1988	Palomar	C. S. Shoemaker	L5	46 km (29 mi)	MPC · JPL
4829 Sergestus	1988 RM_{1}	Sergestus	September 10, 1988	Palomar	C. S. Shoemaker	L5	32 km (20 mi)	MPC · JPL
4830 Thomascooley	1988 RG_{4}	Thomascooley	September 1, 1988	La Silla	H. Debehogne	V	5.7 km (3.5 mi)	MPC · JPL
4831 Baldwin	1988 RX_{11}	Baldwin	September 14, 1988	Cerro Tololo	S. J. Bus	THM	18 km (11 mi)	MPC · JPL
4832 Palinurus	1988 TU_{1}	Palinurus	October 12, 1988	Palomar	C. S. Shoemaker	L5	52 km (32 mi)	MPC · JPL
4833 Meges	1989 AL_{2}	Meges	January 8, 1989	Palomar	C. S. Shoemaker	L4	80 km (50 mi)	MPC · JPL
4834 Thoas	1989 AM_{2}	Thoas	January 11, 1989	Palomar	C. S. Shoemaker	L4	72 km (45 mi)	MPC · JPL
4835 Asaeus	1989 BQ	Asaeus	January 29, 1989	Tokushima	M. Iwamoto, T. Furuta	L4	30 km (19 mi)	MPC · JPL
4836 Medon	1989 CK_{1}	Medon	February 2, 1989	Palomar	C. S. Shoemaker	L4	63 km (39 mi)	MPC · JPL
4837 Bickerton	1989 ME	Bickerton	June 30, 1989	Lake Tekapo	A. C. Gilmore, P. M. Kilmartin	·	28 km (17 mi)	MPC · JPL
4838 Billmclaughlin	1989 NJ	Billmclaughlin	July 2, 1989	Palomar	E. F. Helin	·	10 km (6.2 mi)	MPC · JPL
4839 Daisetsuzan	1989 QG	Daisetsuzan	August 25, 1989	Kitami	K. Endate, K. Watanabe	·	8.1 km (5.0 mi)	MPC · JPL
4840 Otaynang	1989 UY	Otaynang	October 23, 1989	Gekko	Y. Oshima	URS · slow	21 km (13 mi)	MPC · JPL
4841 Manjiro	1989 UO_{3}	Manjiro	October 28, 1989	Geisei	T. Seki	·	5.3 km (3.3 mi)	MPC · JPL
4842 Atsushi	1989 WK	Atsushi	November 21, 1989	Kushiro	S. Ueda, H. Kaneda	·	4.6 km (2.9 mi)	MPC · JPL
4843 Mégantic	1990 DR_{4}	Mégantic	February 28, 1990	La Silla	H. Debehogne	EOS	27 km (17 mi)	MPC · JPL
4844 Matsuyama	1991 BA_{2}	Matsuyama	January 23, 1991	Kushiro	S. Ueda, H. Kaneda	·	7.6 km (4.7 mi)	MPC · JPL
4845 Tsubetsu	1991 EC_{1}	Tsubetsu	March 5, 1991	Kitami	K. Endate, K. Watanabe	·	7.8 km (4.8 mi)	MPC · JPL
4846 Tuthmosis	6575 P-L	Tuthmosis	September 24, 1960	Palomar	C. J. van Houten, I. van Houten-Groeneveld, T. Gehrels	·	12 km (7.5 mi)	MPC · JPL
4847 Amenhotep	6787 P-L	Amenhotep	September 24, 1960	Palomar	C. J. van Houten, I. van Houten-Groeneveld, T. Gehrels	·	3.1 km (1.9 mi)	MPC · JPL
4848 Tutenchamun	3233 T-2	Tutenchamun	September 30, 1973	Palomar	C. J. van Houten, I. van Houten-Groeneveld, T. Gehrels	HYG	22 km (14 mi)	MPC · JPL
4849 Ardenne	1936 QV	Ardenne	August 17, 1936	Heidelberg	K. Reinmuth	·	4.2 km (2.6 mi)	MPC · JPL
4850 Palestrina	1973 UJ_{5}	Palestrina	October 27, 1973	Tautenburg Observatory	F. Börngen	KOR	7.6 km (4.7 mi)	MPC · JPL
4851 Vodopʹyanova	1976 US_{1}	Vodopʹyanova	October 26, 1976	Nauchnij	T. M. Smirnova	MAR	6.9 km (4.3 mi)	MPC · JPL
4852 Pamjones	1977 JD	Pamjones	May 15, 1977	Nauchnij	N. S. Chernykh	V	3.5 km (2.2 mi)	MPC · JPL
4853 Marielukac	1979 ML	Marielukac	June 28, 1979	Cerro El Roble	C. Torres	·	6.2 km (3.9 mi)	MPC · JPL
4854 Edscott	1981 ED_{27}	Edscott	March 2, 1981	Siding Spring	S. J. Bus	EOS	10 km (6.2 mi)	MPC · JPL
4855 Tenpyou	1982 VM_{5}	Tenpyou	November 14, 1982	Kiso	H. Kosai, K. Furukawa	·	4.0 km (2.5 mi)	MPC · JPL
4856 Seaborg	1983 LJ	Seaborg	June 11, 1983	Palomar	C. S. Shoemaker	MAR	10 km (6.2 mi)	MPC · JPL
4857 Altgamia	1984 FM	Altgamia	March 29, 1984	Palomar	C. S. Shoemaker	PHO	6.2 km (3.9 mi)	MPC · JPL
4858 Vorobjov	1985 UA	Vorobjov	October 23, 1985	Palomar	Gibson, J.	·	3.3 km (2.1 mi)	MPC · JPL
4859 Fraknoi	1986 TJ_{2}	Fraknoi	October 7, 1986	Anderson Mesa	E. Bowell	BAP	7.1 km (4.4 mi)	MPC · JPL
4860 Gubbio	1987 EP	Gubbio	March 3, 1987	Anderson Mesa	E. Bowell	·	26 km (16 mi)	MPC · JPL
4861 Nemirovskij	1987 QU_{10}	Nemirovskij	August 27, 1987	Nauchnij	L. G. Karachkina	·	6.6 km (4.1 mi)	MPC · JPL
4862 Loke	1987 SJ_{5}	Loke	September 30, 1987	Brorfelde	P. Jensen	·	6.6 km (4.1 mi)	MPC · JPL
4863 Yasutani	1987 VH_{1}	Yasutani	November 13, 1987	Kushiro	S. Ueda, H. Kaneda	KOR	9.8 km (6.1 mi)	MPC · JPL
4864 Nimoy	1988 RA_{5}	Nimoy	September 2, 1988	La Silla	H. Debehogne	·	12 km (7.5 mi)	MPC · JPL
4865 Sor	1988 UJ	Sor	October 18, 1988	Geisei	T. Seki	EOS	10 km (6.2 mi)	MPC · JPL
4866 Badillo	1988 VB_{3}	Badillo	November 10, 1988	Chiyoda	T. Kojima	EOS · slow	13 km (8.1 mi)	MPC · JPL
4867 Polites	1989 SZ	Polites	September 27, 1989	Palomar	C. S. Shoemaker	L5	57 km (35 mi)	MPC · JPL
4868 Knushevia	1989 UN_{2}	Knushevia	October 27, 1989	Palomar	E. F. Helin	H · moon	1.5 km (0.93 mi)	MPC · JPL
4869 Piotrovsky	1989 UE_{8}	Piotrovsky	October 26, 1989	Nauchnij	L. I. Chernykh	·	6.3 km (3.9 mi)	MPC · JPL
4870 Shcherbanʹ	1989 UK_{8}	Shcherbanʹ	October 25, 1989	Nauchnij	L. V. Zhuravleva	·	20 km (12 mi)	MPC · JPL
4871 Riverside	1989 WH_{1}	Riverside	November 24, 1989	Ayashi Station	M. Koishikawa	·	5.1 km (3.2 mi)	MPC · JPL
4872 Grieg	1989 YH_{7}	Grieg	December 25, 1989	Tautenburg Observatory	F. Börngen	·	7.6 km (4.7 mi)	MPC · JPL
4873 Fukaya	1990 EC	Fukaya	March 4, 1990	Dynic	A. Sugie	EOS	12 km (7.5 mi)	MPC · JPL
4874 Burke	1991 AW	Burke	January 12, 1991	Palomar	E. F. Helin	EUN	9.3 km (5.8 mi)	MPC · JPL
4875 Ingalls	1991 DJ	Ingalls	February 19, 1991	Yatsugatake	Y. Kushida, R. Kushida	·	5.5 km (3.4 mi)	MPC · JPL
4876 Strabo	1133 T-2	Strabo	September 29, 1973	Palomar	C. J. van Houten, I. van Houten-Groeneveld, T. Gehrels	KOR	7.6 km (4.7 mi)	MPC · JPL
4877 Humboldt	5066 T-2	Humboldt	September 25, 1973	Palomar	C. J. van Houten, I. van Houten-Groeneveld, T. Gehrels	EUN	6.8 km (4.2 mi)	MPC · JPL
4878 Gilhutton	1968 OF	Gilhutton	July 18, 1968	Cerro El Roble	C. Torres, Cofre, S.	V	2.6 km (1.6 mi)	MPC · JPL
4879 Zykina	1974 VG	Zykina	November 12, 1974	Nauchnij	L. I. Chernykh	·	13 km (8.1 mi)	MPC · JPL
4880 Tovstonogov	1975 TR_{4}	Tovstonogov	October 14, 1975	Nauchnij	L. I. Chernykh	HNS	8.9 km (5.5 mi)	MPC · JPL
4881 Robmackintosh	1975 XJ	Robmackintosh	December 1, 1975	Cerro El Roble	C. Torres	·	3.0 km (1.9 mi)	MPC · JPL
4882 Divari	1977 QU_{2}	Divari	August 21, 1977	Nauchnij	N. S. Chernykh	·	5.2 km (3.2 mi)	MPC · JPL
4883 Korolirina	1978 RJ_{1}	Korolirina	September 5, 1978	Nauchnij	N. S. Chernykh	·	8.3 km (5.2 mi)	MPC · JPL
4884 Bragaria	1979 OK_{15}	Bragaria	July 21, 1979	Nauchnij	N. S. Chernykh	·	4.8 km (3.0 mi)	MPC · JPL
4885 Grange	1980 LU	Grange	June 10, 1980	Palomar	C. S. Shoemaker	·	4.8 km (3.0 mi)	MPC · JPL
4886 Kojima	1981 EZ_{14}	Kojima	March 1, 1981	Siding Spring	S. J. Bus	·	7.6 km (4.7 mi)	MPC · JPL
4887 Takihiroi	1981 EV_{26}	Takihiroi	March 2, 1981	Siding Spring	S. J. Bus	KOR	6.5 km (4.0 mi)	MPC · JPL
4888 Doreen	1981 JX_{1}	Doreen	May 5, 1981	Palomar	C. S. Shoemaker	·	4.3 km (2.7 mi)	MPC · JPL
4889 Praetorius	1982 UW_{3}	Praetorius	October 19, 1982	Tautenburg Observatory	F. Börngen	·	21 km (13 mi)	MPC · JPL
4890 Shikanosima	1982 VE_{4}	Shikanosima	November 14, 1982	Kiso	H. Kosai, K. Furukawa	·	4.7 km (2.9 mi)	MPC · JPL
4891 Blaga	1984 GR	Blaga	April 4, 1984	Smolyan	Bulgarian National Observatory	·	21 km (13 mi)	MPC · JPL
4892 Chrispollas	1985 TV_{2}	Chrispollas	October 11, 1985	Caussols	CERGA	slow	7.3 km (4.5 mi)	MPC · JPL
4893 Seitter	1986 PT_{4}	Seitter	August 9, 1986	Smolyan	E. W. Elst, V. G. Ivanova	·	20 km (12 mi)	MPC · JPL
4894 Ask	1986 RJ	Ask	September 8, 1986	Brorfelde	P. Jensen	·	5.0 km (3.1 mi)	MPC · JPL
4895 Embla	1986 TK_{4}	Embla	October 13, 1986	Brorfelde	P. Jensen	·	5.3 km (3.3 mi)	MPC · JPL
4896 Tomoegozen	1986 YA	Tomoegozen	December 20, 1986	Ojima	T. Niijima, T. Urata	·	29 km (18 mi)	MPC · JPL
4897 Tomhamilton	1987 QD_{6}	Tomhamilton	August 22, 1987	Palomar	E. F. Helin	EOS	14 km (8.7 mi)	MPC · JPL
4898 Nishiizumi	1988 FJ	Nishiizumi	March 19, 1988	Palomar	C. S. Shoemaker	H	2.2 km (1.4 mi)	MPC · JPL
4899 Candace	1988 JU	Candace	May 9, 1988	Palomar	C. S. Shoemaker, E. M. Shoemaker	PHO	6.5 km (4.0 mi)	MPC · JPL
4900 Maymelou	1988 ME	Maymelou	June 16, 1988	Palomar	E. F. Helin	V	4.7 km (2.9 mi)	MPC · JPL

== 4901–5000 ==
back to top

Designation			Discovery			Properties		Ref
Permanent	Provisional	Named after	Date	Site	Discoverer(s)	Category	Diam.	Ref
4901 Ó Briain	1988 VJ	Ó Briain	November 3, 1988	Yorii	M. Arai, H. Mori	(2076) · moon	5.2 km (3.2 mi)	MPC · JPL
4902 Thessandrus	1989 AN_{2}	Thessandrus	January 9, 1989	Palomar	C. S. Shoemaker	L4 · slow	51 km (32 mi)	MPC · JPL
4903 Ichikawa	1989 UD	Ichikawa	October 20, 1989	Kani	Y. Mizuno, T. Furuta	THM	15 km (9.3 mi)	MPC · JPL
4904 Makio	1989 WZ	Makio	November 21, 1989	Kani	Y. Mizuno, T. Furuta	·	7.0 km (4.3 mi)	MPC · JPL
4905 Hiromi	1991 JM_{1}	Hiromi	May 15, 1991	Kitami	A. Takahashi, K. Watanabe	EUN	8.4 km (5.2 mi)	MPC · JPL
4906 Seneferu	2533 P-L	Seneferu	September 24, 1960	Palomar	C. J. van Houten, I. van Houten-Groeneveld, T. Gehrels	·	3.1 km (1.9 mi)	MPC · JPL
4907 Zoser	7618 P-L	Zoser	October 17, 1960	Palomar	C. J. van Houten, I. van Houten-Groeneveld, T. Gehrels	·	21 km (13 mi)	MPC · JPL
4908 Ward	1933 SD	Ward	September 17, 1933	Uccle	F. Rigaux	·	4.9 km (3.0 mi)	MPC · JPL
4909 Couteau	1949 SA_{1}	Couteau	September 28, 1949	Nice	M. Laugier	·	5.3 km (3.3 mi)	MPC · JPL
4910 Kawasato	1953 PR	Kawasato	August 11, 1953	Heidelberg	K. Reinmuth	·	4.3 km (2.7 mi)	MPC · JPL
4911 Rosenzweig	1953 UD	Rosenzweig	October 16, 1953	Brooklyn	Indiana University	EUN	10 km (6.2 mi)	MPC · JPL
4912 Emilhaury	1953 VX_{1}	Emilhaury	November 11, 1953	Brooklyn	Indiana University	·	6.5 km (4.0 mi)	MPC · JPL
4913 Wangxuan	1965 SO	Wangxuan	September 20, 1965	Nanking	Purple Mountain	NYS	6.0 km (3.7 mi)	MPC · JPL
4914 Pardina	1969 GD	Pardina	April 9, 1969	El Leoncito	Félix Aguilar Observatory	EUN	11 km (6.8 mi)	MPC · JPL
4915 Solzhenitsyn	1969 TJ_{2}	Solzhenitsyn	October 8, 1969	Nauchnij	L. I. Chernykh	·	12 km (7.5 mi)	MPC · JPL
4916 Brumberg	1970 PS	Brumberg	August 10, 1970	Nauchnij	Crimean Astrophysical Observatory	EOS	17 km (11 mi)	MPC · JPL
4917 Yurilvovia	1973 SC_{6}	Yurilvovia	September 28, 1973	Nauchnij	Crimean Astrophysical Observatory	AGN	8.4 km (5.2 mi)	MPC · JPL
4918 Rostropovich	1974 QU_{1}	Rostropovich	August 24, 1974	Nauchnij	L. I. Chernykh	·	12 km (7.5 mi)	MPC · JPL
4919 Vishnevskaya	1974 SR_{1}	Vishnevskaya	September 19, 1974	Nauchnij	L. I. Chernykh	·	3.0 km (1.9 mi)	MPC · JPL
4920 Gromov	1978 PY_{2}	Gromov	August 8, 1978	Nauchnij	N. S. Chernykh	·	10 km (6.2 mi)	MPC · JPL
4921 Volonté	1980 SJ	Volonté	September 29, 1980	Kleť	Z. Vávrová	·	5.1 km (3.2 mi)	MPC · JPL
4922 Leshin	1981 EH_{4}	Leshin	March 2, 1981	Siding Spring	S. J. Bus	·	5.0 km (3.1 mi)	MPC · JPL
4923 Clarke	1981 EO_{27}	Clarke	March 2, 1981	Siding Spring	S. J. Bus	·	3.4 km (2.1 mi)	MPC · JPL
4924 Hiltner	1981 EQ_{40}	Hiltner	March 2, 1981	Siding Spring	S. J. Bus	·	2.3 km (1.4 mi)	MPC · JPL
4925 Zhoushan	1981 XH_{2}	Zhoushan	December 3, 1981	Nanking	Purple Mountain	·	14 km (8.7 mi)	MPC · JPL
4926 Smoktunovskij	1982 ST_{6}	Smoktunovskij	September 16, 1982	Nauchnij	L. I. Chernykh	KOR	7.1 km (4.4 mi)	MPC · JPL
4927 O'Connell	1982 UP_{2}	O'Connell	October 21, 1982	Kleť	Z. Vávrová	KOR	7.0 km (4.3 mi)	MPC · JPL
4928 Vermeer	1982 UG_{7}	Vermeer	October 21, 1982	Nauchnij	L. G. Karachkina	·	4.1 km (2.5 mi)	MPC · JPL
4929 Yamatai	1982 XV	Yamatai	December 13, 1982	Kiso	H. Kosai, K. Furukawa	·	4.0 km (2.5 mi)	MPC · JPL
4930 Rephiltim	1983 AO_{2}	Rephiltim	January 10, 1983	Palomar	Salyards, S. L.	·	36 km (22 mi)	MPC · JPL
4931 Tomsk	1983 CN_{3}	Tomsk	February 11, 1983	La Silla	H. Debehogne, G. de Sanctis	·	7.6 km (4.7 mi)	MPC · JPL
4932 Texstapa	1984 EA_{1}	Texstapa	March 9, 1984	Anderson Mesa	B. A. Skiff	·	26 km (16 mi)	MPC · JPL
4933 Tylerlinder	1984 EN_{1}	Tylerlinder	March 2, 1984	La Silla	H. Debehogne	·	5.3 km (3.3 mi)	MPC · JPL
4934 Rhôneranger	1985 JJ	Rhôneranger	May 15, 1985	Anderson Mesa	E. Bowell	EOS · slow	12 km (7.5 mi)	MPC · JPL
4935 Maslachkova	1985 PD_{2}	Maslachkova	August 13, 1985	Nauchnij	N. S. Chernykh	·	5.3 km (3.3 mi)	MPC · JPL
4936 Butakov	1985 UY_{4}	Butakov	October 22, 1985	Nauchnij	L. V. Zhuravleva	(2076)	4.5 km (2.8 mi)	MPC · JPL
4937 Lintott	1986 CL_{1}	Lintott	February 1, 1986	La Silla	H. Debehogne	(194)	9.8 km (6.1 mi)	MPC · JPL
4938 Papadopoulos	1986 CQ_{1}	Papadopoulos	February 5, 1986	La Silla	H. Debehogne	·	6.4 km (4.0 mi)	MPC · JPL
4939 Scovil	1986 QL_{1}	Scovil	August 27, 1986	La Silla	H. Debehogne	·	5.2 km (3.2 mi)	MPC · JPL
4940 Polenov	1986 QY_{4}	Polenov	August 18, 1986	Nauchnij	L. G. Karachkina	THM	18 km (11 mi)	MPC · JPL
4941 Yahagi	1986 UA	Yahagi	October 25, 1986	Toyota	K. Suzuki, T. Urata	THM	18 km (11 mi)	MPC · JPL
4942 Munroe	1987 DU_{6}	Munroe	February 24, 1987	La Silla	H. Debehogne	·	3.5 km (2.2 mi)	MPC · JPL
4943 Lac d'Orient	1987 OQ	Lac d'Orient	July 27, 1987	Haute-Provence	E. W. Elst	EUN	6.4 km (4.0 mi)	MPC · JPL
4944 Kozlovskij	1987 RP_{3}	Kozlovskij	September 2, 1987	Nauchnij	L. I. Chernykh	·	11 km (6.8 mi)	MPC · JPL
4945 Ikenozenni	1987 SJ	Ikenozenni	September 18, 1987	Toyota	K. Suzuki, T. Urata	(5)	7.4 km (4.6 mi)	MPC · JPL
4946 Askalaphus	1988 BW_{1}	Askalaphus	January 21, 1988	Palomar	C. S. Shoemaker, E. M. Shoemaker	L4	48 km (30 mi)	MPC · JPL
4947 Ninkasi	1988 TJ_{1}	Ninkasi	October 12, 1988	Palomar	C. S. Shoemaker	AMO +1 km (0.62 mi)	860 m (2,820 ft)	MPC · JPL
4948 Hideonishimura	1988 VF_{1}	Hideonishimura	November 3, 1988	Oohira	Oohira	·	3.9 km (2.4 mi)	MPC · JPL
4949 Akasofu	1988 WE	Akasofu	November 29, 1988	Chiyoda	T. Kojima	·	4.5 km (2.8 mi)	MPC · JPL
4950 House	1988 XO_{1}	House	December 7, 1988	Palomar	E. F. Helin	·	7.3 km (4.5 mi)	MPC · JPL
4951 Iwamoto	1990 BM	Iwamoto	January 21, 1990	Kani	Y. Mizuno, T. Furuta	moon · slow	5.2 km (3.2 mi)	MPC · JPL
4952 Kibeshigemaro	1990 FC_{1}	Kibeshigemaro	March 26, 1990	Dynic	A. Sugie	·	19 km (12 mi)	MPC · JPL
4953	1990 MU	—	June 23, 1990	Siding Spring	R. H. McNaught	APO +1 km (0.62 mi) · PHA	3.8 km (2.4 mi)	MPC · JPL
4954 Eric	1990 SQ	Eric	September 23, 1990	Palomar	B. Roman	AMO +1 km (0.62 mi)	11 km (6.8 mi)	MPC · JPL
4955 Gold	1990 SF_{2}	Gold	September 17, 1990	Palomar	H. E. Holt	(1298)	20 km (12 mi)	MPC · JPL
4956 Noymer	1990 VG_{1}	Noymer	November 12, 1990	Siding Spring	R. H. McNaught	PHO	5.6 km (3.5 mi)	MPC · JPL
4957 Brucemurray	1990 XJ	Brucemurray	December 15, 1990	Palomar	E. F. Helin	AMO +1 km (0.62 mi)	3.5 km (2.2 mi)	MPC · JPL
4958 Wellnitz	1991 NT_{1}	Wellnitz	July 13, 1991	Palomar	H. E. Holt	EOS	16 km (9.9 mi)	MPC · JPL
4959 Niinoama	1991 PA_{1}	Niinoama	August 15, 1991	Yakiimo	Natori, A., T. Urata	·	36 km (22 mi)	MPC · JPL
4960 Mayo	4657 P-L	Mayo	September 24, 1960	Palomar	C. J. van Houten, I. van Houten-Groeneveld, T. Gehrels	·	11 km (6.8 mi)	MPC · JPL
4961 Timherder	1958 TH_{1}	Timherder	October 8, 1958	Flagstaff	Lowell Observatory	·	11 km (6.8 mi)	MPC · JPL
4962 Vecherka	1973 TP	Vecherka	October 1, 1973	Nauchnij	T. M. Smirnova	MAR · slow	10 km (6.2 mi)	MPC · JPL
4963 Kanroku	1977 DR_{1}	Kanroku	February 18, 1977	Kiso	H. Kosai, K. Furukawa	EUN	11 km (6.8 mi)	MPC · JPL
4964 Kourovka	1979 OD_{15}	Kourovka	July 21, 1979	Nauchnij	N. S. Chernykh	·	4.4 km (2.7 mi)	MPC · JPL
4965 Takeda	1981 EP_{28}	Takeda	March 6, 1981	Siding Spring	S. J. Bus	KOR	4.8 km (3.0 mi)	MPC · JPL
4966 Edolsen	1981 EO_{34}	Edolsen	March 2, 1981	Siding Spring	S. J. Bus	·	10 km (6.2 mi)	MPC · JPL
4967 Glia	1983 CF_{1}	Glia	February 11, 1983	Anderson Mesa	N. G. Thomas	·	30 km (19 mi)	MPC · JPL
4968 Suzamur	1986 PQ	Suzamur	August 1, 1986	Palomar	E. F. Helin	·	6.7 km (4.2 mi)	MPC · JPL
4969 Lawrence	1986 TU	Lawrence	October 4, 1986	Palomar	E. F. Helin	PAL	6.7 km (4.2 mi)	MPC · JPL
4970 Druyan	1988 VO_{2}	Druyan	November 12, 1988	Palomar	E. F. Helin	·	8.1 km (5.0 mi)	MPC · JPL
4971 Hoshinohiroba	1989 BY	Hoshinohiroba	January 30, 1989	Kitami	T. Fujii, K. Watanabe	NYS	4.7 km (2.9 mi)	MPC · JPL
4972 Pachelbel	1989 UE_{7}	Pachelbel	October 23, 1989	Tautenburg Observatory	F. Börngen	THM	12 km (7.5 mi)	MPC · JPL
4973 Showa	1990 FT	Showa	March 18, 1990	Kitami	K. Endate, K. Watanabe	CYB	28 km (17 mi)	MPC · JPL
4974 Elford	1990 LA	Elford	June 14, 1990	Siding Spring	R. H. McNaught	EUN	8.2 km (5.1 mi)	MPC · JPL
4975 Dohmoto	1990 SZ_{1}	Dohmoto	September 16, 1990	Kitami	T. Fujii, K. Watanabe	·	18 km (11 mi)	MPC · JPL
4976 Choukyongchol	1991 PM	Choukyongchol	August 9, 1991	JCPM Sapporo	K. Watanabe	EOS	17 km (11 mi)	MPC · JPL
4977 Rauthgundis	2018 P-L	Rauthgundis	September 24, 1960	Palomar	C. J. van Houten, I. van Houten-Groeneveld, T. Gehrels	·	3.9 km (2.4 mi)	MPC · JPL
4978 Seitz	4069 T-2	Seitz	September 29, 1973	Palomar	C. J. van Houten, I. van Houten-Groeneveld, T. Gehrels	·	5.2 km (3.2 mi)	MPC · JPL
4979 Otawara	1949 PQ	Otawara	August 2, 1949	Heidelberg	K. Reinmuth	·	3.2 km (2.0 mi)	MPC · JPL
4980 Magomaev	1974 SP_{1}	Magomaev	September 19, 1974	Nauchnij	L. I. Chernykh	THM	17 km (11 mi)	MPC · JPL
4981 Sinyavskaya	1974 VS	Sinyavskaya	November 12, 1974	Nauchnij	L. I. Chernykh	KOR	9.2 km (5.7 mi)	MPC · JPL
4982 Bartini	1977 PE_{1}	Bartini	August 14, 1977	Nauchnij	N. S. Chernykh	·	8.0 km (5.0 mi)	MPC · JPL
4983 Schroeteria	1977 RD_{7}	Schroeteria	September 11, 1977	Nauchnij	N. S. Chernykh	·	4.9 km (3.0 mi)	MPC · JPL
4984 Patrickmiller	1978 VU_{10}	Patrickmiller	November 7, 1978	Palomar	E. F. Helin, S. J. Bus	·	2.8 km (1.7 mi)	MPC · JPL
4985 Fitzsimmons	1979 QK_{4}	Fitzsimmons	August 23, 1979	La Silla	C.-I. Lagerkvist	THM	12 km (7.5 mi)	MPC · JPL
4986 Osipovia	1979 SL_{7}	Osipovia	September 23, 1979	Nauchnij	N. S. Chernykh	·	5.8 km (3.6 mi)	MPC · JPL
4987 Flamsteed	1980 FH_{12}	Flamsteed	March 20, 1980	Bickley	Perth Observatory	·	5.6 km (3.5 mi)	MPC · JPL
4988 Chushuho	1980 VU_{1}	Chushuho	November 6, 1980	Nanking	Purple Mountain	NYS	3.6 km (2.2 mi)	MPC · JPL
4989 Joegoldstein	1981 DX_{1}	Joegoldstein	February 28, 1981	Siding Spring	S. J. Bus	EUN	5.3 km (3.3 mi)	MPC · JPL
4990 Trombka	1981 ET_{26}	Trombka	March 2, 1981	Siding Spring	S. J. Bus	·	4.5 km (2.8 mi)	MPC · JPL
4991 Hansuess	1981 EU_{29}	Hansuess	March 1, 1981	Siding Spring	S. J. Bus	EOS	9.8 km (6.1 mi)	MPC · JPL
4992 Kálmán	1982 UX_{10}	Kálmán	October 25, 1982	Nauchnij	L. V. Zhuravleva	MAR	6.5 km (4.0 mi)	MPC · JPL
4993 Cossard	1983 GR	Cossard	April 11, 1983	La Silla	H. Debehogne, G. de Sanctis	V	4.1 km (2.5 mi)	MPC · JPL
4994 Kisala	1983 RK_{3}	Kisala	September 1, 1983	La Silla	H. Debehogne	·	5.5 km (3.4 mi)	MPC · JPL
4995 Griffin	1984 QR	Griffin	August 28, 1984	Palomar	Swanson, S. R.	·	7.6 km (4.7 mi)	MPC · JPL
4996 Veisberg	1986 PX_{5}	Veisberg	August 11, 1986	Nauchnij	L. G. Karachkina	·	5.7 km (3.5 mi)	MPC · JPL
4997 Ksana	1986 TM	Ksana	October 6, 1986	Nauchnij	L. G. Karachkina	T_{j} (2.99)	9.9 km (6.2 mi)	MPC · JPL
4998 Kabashima	1986 VG	Kabashima	November 5, 1986	Toyota	K. Suzuki, T. Urata	EOS	16 km (9.9 mi)	MPC · JPL
4999 MPC	1987 CJ	MPC	February 2, 1987	La Silla	E. W. Elst	EOS · slow	12 km (7.5 mi)	MPC · JPL
5000 IAU	1987 QN_{7}	IAU	August 23, 1987	Palomar	E. F. Helin	·	4.2 km (2.6 mi)	MPC · JPL

back to top

== See also ==
- Meanings of minor-planet names: 4001–5000
