= List of minor planets: 14001–15000 =

The following is a partial list of minor planets, running from minor-planet number 14001 through 15000, inclusive. The primary data for this and other partial lists is based on JPL's "Small-Body Orbital Elements" and data available from the Minor Planet Center. Critical list information is also provided by the MPC, unless otherwise specified from Lowell Observatory. A detailed description of the table's columns and additional sources are given on the main page including a complete list of every page in this series, and a statistical break-up on the dynamical classification of minor planets.

Also see the summary list of all named bodies in numerical and alphabetical order, and the corresponding naming citations for the number range of this particular list. New namings may only be added to this list after official publication, as the preannouncement of names is condemned by the Working Group for Small Bodies Nomenclature of the International Astronomical Union.

Near-Earth obj.	MBA (inner)	MBA (outer)	Centaur
Mars-crosser	MBA (middle)	Jupiter trojan	Trans-Neptunian obj.
Unclassified

== 14001–14100 ==
Designation			Discovery			Properties		Ref
Permanent	Provisional	Named after	Date	Site	Discoverer(s)	Category	Diam.	Ref
14001	1993 KR	—	May 26, 1993	Kiyosato	S. Otomo	·	4.4 km	MPC; JPL
14002 Johngoodhue	1993 LW_{1}	Johngoodhue	June 15, 1993	Palomar	H. E. Holt	PHO	4.7 km	MPC; JPL
14003 Waynegilmore	1993 OO_{4}	Waynegilmore	July 20, 1993	La Silla	E. W. Elst	(5)	2.6 km	MPC; JPL
14004 Chikama	1993 SK_{2}	Chikama	September 19, 1993	Kitami	K. Endate, K. Watanabe	·	7.8 km	MPC; JPL
14005 Ferrínmoreiras	1993 SO_{3}	Ferrínmoreiras	September 22, 1993	Mérida	Naranjo, O. A.	·	20 km	MPC; JPL
14006 Sakamotofumio	1993 SA_{4}	Sakamotofumio	September 18, 1993	Kitami	K. Endate, K. Watanabe	·	11 km	MPC; JPL
14007 Fiamingo	1993 TH_{14}	Fiamingo	October 9, 1993	La Silla	E. W. Elst	·	5.2 km	MPC; JPL
14008 Toniscarmato	1993 TD_{17}	Toniscarmato	October 9, 1993	La Silla	E. W. Elst	AST	6.4 km	MPC; JPL
14009	1993 TQ_{36}	—	October 13, 1993	Palomar	H. E. Holt	·	13 km	MPC; JPL
14010 Jomonaomori	1993 UL	Jomonaomori	October 16, 1993	Kitami	K. Endate, K. Watanabe	EUN	4.0 km	MPC; JPL
14011	1993 US	—	October 22, 1993	Oohira	T. Urata	·	4.4 km	MPC; JPL
14012 Amedee	1993 XG	Amedee	December 6, 1993	Geisei	T. Seki	·	11 km	MPC; JPL
14013	1993 YF	—	December 17, 1993	Oizumi	T. Kobayashi	THM	7.4 km	MPC; JPL
14014 Münchhausen	1994 AL_{16}	Münchhausen	January 14, 1994	Tautenburg Observatory	F. Börngen	EOS	8.6 km	MPC; JPL
14015 Senancour	1994 BD_{4}	Senancour	January 16, 1994	Caussols	E. W. Elst, C. Pollas	·	9.6 km	MPC; JPL
14016 Steller	1994 BJ_{4}	Steller	January 16, 1994	Caussols	E. W. Elst, C. Pollas	EOS	7.5 km	MPC; JPL
14017	1994 NS	—	July 4, 1994	Nachi-Katsuura	Y. Shimizu, T. Urata	·	3.2 km	MPC; JPL
14018	1994 PM_{14}	—	August 10, 1994	La Silla	E. W. Elst	NYS	3.2 km	MPC; JPL
14019 Pourbus	1994 PP_{16}	Pourbus	August 10, 1994	La Silla	E. W. Elst	·	2.1 km	MPC; JPL
14020	1994 PE_{18}	—	August 10, 1994	La Silla	E. W. Elst	·	2.5 km	MPC; JPL
14021	1994 PL_{20}	—	August 12, 1994	La Silla	E. W. Elst	·	3.1 km	MPC; JPL
14022	1994 PW_{27}	—	August 12, 1994	La Silla	E. W. Elst	·	3.1 km	MPC; JPL
14023	1994 PX_{31}	—	August 12, 1994	La Silla	E. W. Elst	V	3.5 km	MPC; JPL
14024 Procol Harum	1994 RZ	Procol Harum	September 9, 1994	Sormano	P. Sicoli, Ghezzi, P.	·	3.9 km	MPC; JPL
14025 Fallada	1994 RR_{11}	Fallada	September 2, 1994	Tautenburg Observatory	F. Börngen	·	4.5 km	MPC; JPL
14026 Esquerdo	1994 ST_{7}	Esquerdo	September 28, 1994	Kitt Peak	Spacewatch	NYS	4.4 km	MPC; JPL
14027 Ichimoto	1994 TJ_{1}	Ichimoto	October 2, 1994	Kitami	K. Endate, K. Watanabe	(5)	3.0 km	MPC; JPL
14028 Nakamurahiroshi	1994 TZ_{14}	Nakamurahiroshi	October 5, 1994	Kitami	K. Endate, K. Watanabe	·	4.2 km	MPC; JPL
14029	1994 UC_{1}	—	October 31, 1994	Nachi-Katsuura	Y. Shimizu, T. Urata	·	6.4 km	MPC; JPL
14030	1994 UP_{1}	—	October 25, 1994	Kushiro	S. Ueda, H. Kaneda	EUN	4.2 km	MPC; JPL
14031 Rozyo	1994 WF_{2}	Rozyo	November 26, 1994	Kitami	K. Endate, K. Watanabe	EUN	7.4 km	MPC; JPL
14032 Mego	1994 XP	Mego	December 4, 1994	Ayashi Station	M. Koishikawa	RAF	4.5 km	MPC; JPL
14033	1994 YR	—	December 28, 1994	Oizumi	T. Kobayashi	·	8.2 km	MPC; JPL
14034	1995 BW	—	January 25, 1995	Oizumi	T. Kobayashi	·	5.2 km	MPC; JPL
14035	1995 CJ	—	February 1, 1995	Oizumi	T. Kobayashi	slow	13 km	MPC; JPL
14036 Yasuhirotoyama	1995 EY_{7}	Yasuhirotoyama	March 5, 1995	Nyukasa	M. Hirasawa, S. Suzuki	·	6.9 km	MPC; JPL
14037 Takakikasahara	1995 EZ_{7}	Takakikasahara	March 5, 1995	Nyukasa	M. Hirasawa, S. Suzuki	·	13 km	MPC; JPL
14038	1995 HR	—	April 27, 1995	Kushiro	S. Ueda, H. Kaneda	·	7.9 km	MPC; JPL
14039	1995 KZ_{1}	—	May 28, 1995	Palomar	E. F. Helin	URS	19 km	MPC; JPL
14040 Andrejka	1995 QD_{2}	Andrejka	August 23, 1995	Modra	A. Galád, Pravda, A.	slow	2.2 km	MPC; JPL
14041 Dürrenmatt	1995 SO_{54}	Dürrenmatt	September 21, 1995	Tautenburg Observatory	F. Börngen	·	3.1 km	MPC; JPL
14042 Agafonov	1995 UG_{5}	Agafonov	October 16, 1995	Zelenchukskaya	T. V. Krjačko	·	2.4 km	MPC; JPL
14043	1995 UA_{45}	—	October 20, 1995	Uenohara	N. Kawasato	·	3.0 km	MPC; JPL
14044	1995 VS_{1}	—	November 1, 1995	Kiyosato	S. Otomo	V	4.1 km	MPC; JPL
14045	1995 VW_{1}	—	November 4, 1995	Xinglong	SCAP	·	3.8 km	MPC; JPL
14046 Keikai	1995 WE_{5}	Keikai	November 17, 1995	Nanyo	T. Okuni	·	2.6 km	MPC; JPL
14047 Kohichiro	1995 WG_{5}	Kohichiro	November 18, 1995	Kitami	K. Endate, K. Watanabe	V	2.9 km	MPC; JPL
14048	1995 WS_{7}	—	November 27, 1995	Oizumi	T. Kobayashi	·	2.8 km	MPC; JPL
14049	1995 XH_{1}	—	December 15, 1995	Oizumi	T. Kobayashi	·	3.6 km	MPC; JPL
14050	1995 YH_{1}	—	December 21, 1995	Oizumi	T. Kobayashi	·	4.5 km	MPC; JPL
14051	1995 YY_{1}	—	December 21, 1995	Oizumi	T. Kobayashi	(2076)	4.1 km	MPC; JPL
14052	1995 YH_{3}	—	December 27, 1995	Oizumi	T. Kobayashi	·	2.6 km	MPC; JPL
14053	1995 YS_{25}	—	December 27, 1995	Bergisch Gladbach	W. Bickel	fast	1.8 km	MPC; JPL
14054 Dušek	1996 AR	Dušek	January 12, 1996	Kleť	M. Tichý, Z. Moravec	·	4.9 km	MPC; JPL
14055	1996 AS	—	January 10, 1996	Oizumi	T. Kobayashi	·	4.8 km	MPC; JPL
14056 Kainar	1996 AO_{1}	Kainar	January 13, 1996	Kleť	Kleť	·	4.3 km	MPC; JPL
14057 Manfredstoll	1996 AV_{1}	Manfredstoll	January 15, 1996	Linz	E. Meyer, E. Obermair	MAS	2.1 km	MPC; JPL
14058	1996 AP_{15}	—	January 14, 1996	Xinglong	SCAP	·	3.8 km	MPC; JPL
14059	1996 BB_{2}	—	January 25, 1996	Oizumi	T. Kobayashi	·	4.7 km	MPC; JPL
14060 Patersonewen	1996 BM_{5}	Patersonewen	January 18, 1996	Kitt Peak	Spacewatch	·	4.0 km	MPC; JPL
14061 Nagincox	1996 CT_{7}	Nagincox	February 13, 1996	Cima Ekar	U. Munari, M. Tombelli	V	2.7 km	MPC; JPL
14062 Cremaschini	1996 CR_{8}	Cremaschini	February 14, 1996	Cima Ekar	M. Tombelli, U. Munari	NYS	4.7 km	MPC; JPL
14063	1996 DZ	—	February 21, 1996	Oizumi	T. Kobayashi	·	7.2 km	MPC; JPL
14064	1996 DT_{3}	—	February 16, 1996	Caussols	E. W. Elst	·	4.1 km	MPC; JPL
14065 Flegel	1996 EY_{5}	Flegel	March 11, 1996	Kitt Peak	Spacewatch	·	3.0 km	MPC; JPL
14066	1996 FA_{4}	—	March 20, 1996	Haleakala	AMOS	EUN	5.4 km	MPC; JPL
14067	1996 GY_{17}	—	April 15, 1996	La Silla	E. W. Elst	KOR	4.0 km	MPC; JPL
14068 Hauserová	1996 HP_{1}	Hauserová	April 21, 1996	Kleť	J. Tichá, M. Tichý	·	4.9 km	MPC; JPL
14069 Krasheninnikov	1996 HP_{18}	Krasheninnikov	April 18, 1996	La Silla	E. W. Elst	·	8.3 km	MPC; JPL
14070	1996 JC_{1}	—	May 14, 1996	Haleakala	NEAT	·	10 km	MPC; JPL
14071 Gadabird	1996 JK_{13}	Gadabird	May 11, 1996	Kitt Peak	Spacewatch	KOR	5.5 km	MPC; JPL
14072 Volterra	1996 KN	Volterra	May 21, 1996	Prescott	P. G. Comba	THM	12 km	MPC; JPL
14073	1996 KO_{1}	—	May 17, 1996	Xinglong	SCAP	·	5.1 km	MPC; JPL
14074 Riccati	1996 NS	Riccati	July 11, 1996	Bologna	San Vittore	·	10 km	MPC; JPL
14075 Kenwill	1996 OJ	Kenwill	July 18, 1996	Rand	G. R. Viscome	THM	10 km	MPC; JPL
14076	1996 OO_{1}	—	July 20, 1996	Xinglong	SCAP	EMA	14 km	MPC; JPL
14077 Volfango	1996 PF_{1}	Volfango	August 9, 1996	Stroncone	A. Vagnozzi	HYG	10 km	MPC; JPL
14078	1997 FQ_{3}	—	March 31, 1997	Socorro	LINEAR	·	2.4 km	MPC; JPL
14079	1997 FV_{3}	—	March 31, 1997	Socorro	LINEAR	V	2.3 km	MPC; JPL
14080 Heppenheim	1997 GB	Heppenheim	April 1, 1997	Starkenburg Observatory	Starkenburg	·	3.8 km	MPC; JPL
14081	1997 GT_{18}	—	April 3, 1997	Socorro	LINEAR	·	2.5 km	MPC; JPL
14082	1997 GK_{21}	—	April 6, 1997	Socorro	LINEAR	·	4.4 km	MPC; JPL
14083	1997 GH_{22}	—	April 6, 1997	Socorro	LINEAR	·	3.6 km	MPC; JPL
14084	1997 GX_{23}	—	April 6, 1997	Socorro	LINEAR	·	8.0 km	MPC; JPL
14085	1997 GA_{37}	—	April 3, 1997	Socorro	LINEAR	·	2.1 km	MPC; JPL
14086	1997 GC_{38}	—	April 6, 1997	Socorro	LINEAR	·	2.2 km	MPC; JPL
14087	1997 HG_{10}	—	April 30, 1997	Socorro	LINEAR	·	2.6 km	MPC; JPL
14088 Ancus	1997 JB_{10}	Ancus	May 3, 1997	Colleverde	V. S. Casulli	·	2.0 km	MPC; JPL
14089	1997 JC_{14}	—	May 8, 1997	Xinglong	SCAP	·	4.7 km	MPC; JPL
14090	1997 MS_{3}	—	June 28, 1997	Socorro	LINEAR	·	3.1 km	MPC; JPL
14091	1997 MQ_{4}	—	June 28, 1997	Socorro	LINEAR	EUN	5.3 km	MPC; JPL
14092 Gaily	1997 MC_{8}	Gaily	June 29, 1997	Kitt Peak	Spacewatch	(12739)	4.5 km	MPC; JPL
14093	1997 OM	—	July 26, 1997	Rand	G. R. Viscome	KOR	3.6 km	MPC; JPL
14094 Garneau	1997 OJ_{1}	Garneau	July 28, 1997	Kitt Peak	Spacewatch	KOR	3.9 km	MPC; JPL
14095	1997 PE_{2}	—	August 7, 1997	Lake Clear	Williams, K. A.	·	5.6 km	MPC; JPL
14096	1997 PC_{4}	—	August 4, 1997	Črni Vrh	Mikuž, H.	(5)	3.3 km	MPC; JPL
14097 Capdepera	1997 PU_{4}	Capdepera	August 11, 1997	Majorca	Á. López J., R. Pacheco	·	6.5 km	MPC; JPL
14098 Šimek	1997 QS	Šimek	August 24, 1997	Modra	A. Galád, Pravda, A.	KOR ·	7.4 km	MPC; JPL
14099	1997 RQ_{3}	—	September 5, 1997	Nachi-Katsuura	Y. Shimizu, T. Urata	THM	11 km	MPC; JPL
14100 Weierstrass	1997 RQ_{5}	Weierstrass	September 8, 1997	Prescott	P. G. Comba	·	9.7 km	MPC; JPL

== 14101–14200 ==
back to top

Designation			Discovery			Properties		Ref
Permanent	Provisional	Named after	Date	Site	Discoverer(s)	Category	Diam.	Ref
14101	1997 SD_{1}	—	September 19, 1997	Xinglong	SCAP	ADE	9.5 km	MPC; JPL
14102	1997 SG_{25}	—	September 29, 1997	Nachi-Katsuura	Y. Shimizu, T. Urata	NYS	3.5 km	MPC; JPL
14103 Manzoni	1997 TC	Manzoni	October 1, 1997	Sormano	P. Sicoli, A. Testa	KOR	4.6 km	MPC; JPL
14104 Delpino	1997 TV	Delpino	October 2, 1997	Sormano	Giuliani, V.	VER	11 km	MPC; JPL
14105 Nakadai	1997 TS_{17}	Nakadai	October 6, 1997	Kitami	K. Endate, K. Watanabe	EOS	9.3 km	MPC; JPL
14106	1997 UO_{24}	—	October 27, 1997	Bergisch Gladbach	W. Bickel	·	5.7 km	MPC; JPL
14107	1997 VM_{5}	—	November 8, 1997	Oizumi	T. Kobayashi	THM	8.2 km	MPC; JPL
14108	1998 OA_{13}	—	July 26, 1998	La Silla	E. W. Elst	·	4.7 km	MPC; JPL
14109	1998 OM_{14}	—	July 26, 1998	La Silla	E. W. Elst	·	5.1 km	MPC; JPL
14110	1998 QA_{23}	—	August 17, 1998	Socorro	LINEAR	NYS	2.7 km	MPC; JPL
14111 Kimamos	1998 QA_{24}	Kimamos	August 17, 1998	Socorro	LINEAR	·	2.4 km	MPC; JPL
14112	1998 QZ_{25}	—	August 25, 1998	Višnjan Observatory	Višnjan	NYS	4.3 km	MPC; JPL
14113	1998 QD_{32}	—	August 17, 1998	Socorro	LINEAR	·	12 km	MPC; JPL
14114 Randyray	1998 QE_{35}	Randyray	August 17, 1998	Socorro	LINEAR	·	4.6 km	MPC; JPL
14115 Melaas	1998 QO_{36}	Melaas	August 17, 1998	Socorro	LINEAR	·	3.6 km	MPC; JPL
14116 Ogea	1998 QC_{40}	Ogea	August 17, 1998	Socorro	LINEAR	·	3.1 km	MPC; JPL
14117	1998 QD_{42}	—	August 17, 1998	Socorro	LINEAR	·	2.3 km	MPC; JPL
14118	1998 QF_{45}	—	August 17, 1998	Socorro	LINEAR	EUN	4.0 km	MPC; JPL
14119 Johnprince	1998 QU_{46}	Johnprince	August 17, 1998	Socorro	LINEAR	V	2.9 km	MPC; JPL
14120 Espenak	1998 QJ_{54}	Espenak	August 27, 1998	Anderson Mesa	LONEOS	V	13 km	MPC; JPL
14121 Stüwe	1998 QM_{54}	Stüwe	August 27, 1998	Anderson Mesa	LONEOS	·	3.7 km	MPC; JPL
14122 Josties	1998 QA_{55}	Josties	August 27, 1998	Anderson Mesa	LONEOS	·	2.8 km	MPC; JPL
14123	1998 QA_{56}	—	August 29, 1998	Višnjan Observatory	Višnjan	(2076)	2.9 km	MPC; JPL
14124 Kamil	1998 QN_{60}	Kamil	August 28, 1998	Ondřejov	L. Kotková	·	3.5 km	MPC; JPL
14125	1998 QT_{62}	—	August 27, 1998	Xinglong	SCAP	·	8.3 km	MPC; JPL
14126	1998 QZ_{90}	—	August 28, 1998	Socorro	LINEAR	EUN	3.7 km	MPC; JPL
14127	1998 QA_{91}	—	August 28, 1998	Socorro	LINEAR	EUN	6.1 km	MPC; JPL
14128	1998 QX_{92}	—	August 28, 1998	Socorro	LINEAR	GEF	5.7 km	MPC; JPL
14129 DiBucci	1998 QO_{95}	DiBucci	August 19, 1998	Socorro	LINEAR	·	4.5 km	MPC; JPL
14130	1998 QQ_{103}	—	August 26, 1998	La Silla	E. W. Elst	·	3.7 km	MPC; JPL
14131	1998 QN_{105}	—	August 25, 1998	La Silla	E. W. Elst	·	2.6 km	MPC; JPL
14132	1998 QB_{106}	—	August 25, 1998	La Silla	E. W. Elst	·	2.8 km	MPC; JPL
14133	1998 RJ_{17}	—	September 14, 1998	Socorro	LINEAR	·	3.5 km	MPC; JPL
14134 Penkala	1998 RP_{42}	Penkala	September 14, 1998	Socorro	LINEAR	·	3.3 km	MPC; JPL
14135 Cynthialang	1998 RZ_{62}	Cynthialang	September 14, 1998	Socorro	LINEAR	NYS	3.5 km	MPC; JPL
14136	1998 RM_{67}	—	September 14, 1998	Socorro	LINEAR	·	4.1 km	MPC; JPL
14137	1998 RB_{71}	—	September 14, 1998	Socorro	LINEAR	·	8.3 km	MPC; JPL
14138	1998 RL_{71}	—	September 14, 1998	Socorro	LINEAR	NYS	4.8 km	MPC; JPL
14139	1998 RX_{72}	—	September 14, 1998	Socorro	LINEAR	·	6.7 km	MPC; JPL
14140	1998 RS_{73}	—	September 14, 1998	Socorro	LINEAR	(5)	3.8 km	MPC; JPL
14141 Demeautis	1998 SR_{1}	Demeautis	September 16, 1998	Caussols	ODAS	·	3.8 km	MPC; JPL
14142	1998 SG_{10}	—	September 17, 1998	Caussols	ODAS	·	4.3 km	MPC; JPL
14143 Hadfield	1998 SQ_{18}	Hadfield	September 18, 1998	Kitt Peak	Spacewatch	·	4.9 km	MPC; JPL
14144	1998 SQ_{22}	—	September 23, 1998	Višnjan Observatory	Višnjan	DOR	8.1 km	MPC; JPL
14145 Sciam	1998 SE_{24}	Sciam	September 17, 1998	Anderson Mesa	LONEOS	·	3.5 km	MPC; JPL
14146 Hughmaclean	1998 SP_{42}	Hughmaclean	September 28, 1998	Kitt Peak	Spacewatch	·	2.8 km	MPC; JPL
14147 Wenlingshuguang	1998 SG_{43}	Wenlingshuguang	September 23, 1998	Xinglong	SCAP	·	4.5 km	MPC; JPL
14148 Jimchamberlin	1998 SO_{45}	Jimchamberlin	September 25, 1998	Kitt Peak	Spacewatch	·	2.3 km	MPC; JPL
14149 Yakowitz	1998 SF_{61}	Yakowitz	September 17, 1998	Anderson Mesa	LONEOS	V	3.8 km	MPC; JPL
14150	1998 SQ_{65}	—	September 20, 1998	La Silla	E. W. Elst	NYS	5.7 km	MPC; JPL
14151	1998 SJ_{73}	—	September 21, 1998	La Silla	E. W. Elst	NYS	3.8 km	MPC; JPL
14152	1998 SV_{73}	—	September 21, 1998	La Silla	E. W. Elst	V	2.0 km	MPC; JPL
14153 Dianecaplain	1998 SA_{80}	Dianecaplain	September 26, 1998	Socorro	LINEAR	·	2.5 km	MPC; JPL
14154 Negrelli	1998 SZ_{106}	Negrelli	September 26, 1998	Socorro	LINEAR	·	5.0 km	MPC; JPL
14155 Cibronen	1998 SK_{122}	Cibronen	September 26, 1998	Socorro	LINEAR	·	3.6 km	MPC; JPL
14156	1998 SV_{131}	—	September 26, 1998	Socorro	LINEAR	·	3.8 km	MPC; JPL
14157 Pamelasobey	1998 SA_{133}	Pamelasobey	September 26, 1998	Socorro	LINEAR	slow	4.1 km	MPC; JPL
14158 Alananderson	1998 SZ_{133}	Alananderson	September 26, 1998	Socorro	LINEAR	V	5.4 km	MPC; JPL
14159	1998 SV_{141}	—	September 26, 1998	Socorro	LINEAR	·	1.8 km	MPC; JPL
14160	1998 SB_{144}	—	September 18, 1998	La Silla	E. W. Elst	·	1.9 km	MPC; JPL
14161	1998 SO_{145}	—	September 20, 1998	La Silla	E. W. Elst	·	3.5 km	MPC; JPL
14162	1998 TV_{1}	—	October 14, 1998	Višnjan Observatory	K. Korlević	PHO	6.1 km	MPC; JPL
14163 Johnchapman	1998 TY_{20}	Johnchapman	October 13, 1998	Kitt Peak	Spacewatch	·	5.0 km	MPC; JPL
14164 Hennigar	1998 TH_{29}	Hennigar	October 15, 1998	Kitt Peak	Spacewatch	KOR	4.0 km	MPC; JPL
14165	1998 UZ	—	October 19, 1998	Zeno	T. Stafford	·	10 km	MPC; JPL
14166	1998 UZ_{6}	—	October 21, 1998	Višnjan Observatory	K. Korlević	EUN	4.7 km	MPC; JPL
14167	1998 UL_{8}	—	October 24, 1998	Oizumi	T. Kobayashi	THM	11 km	MPC; JPL
14168	1998 UR_{15}	—	October 23, 1998	Višnjan Observatory	K. Korlević	THM	13 km	MPC; JPL
14169	1998 UZ_{24}	—	October 25, 1998	Woomera	F. B. Zoltowski	MRX	4.7 km	MPC; JPL
14170	1998 VF_{6}	—	November 11, 1998	Nachi-Katsuura	Y. Shimizu, T. Urata	HYG	9.9 km	MPC; JPL
14171	1998 VO_{6}	—	November 11, 1998	Nachi-Katsuura	Y. Shimizu, T. Urata	slow	14 km	MPC; JPL
14172 Amanolivere	1998 VN_{8}	Amanolivere	November 10, 1998	Socorro	LINEAR	·	4.4 km	MPC; JPL
14173	1998 VL_{9}	—	November 10, 1998	Socorro	LINEAR	·	5.1 km	MPC; JPL
14174 Deborahsmall	1998 VO_{13}	Deborahsmall	November 10, 1998	Socorro	LINEAR	·	3.4 km	MPC; JPL
14175	1998 VO_{18}	—	November 10, 1998	Socorro	LINEAR	·	10 km	MPC; JPL
14176	1998 VB_{28}	—	November 10, 1998	Socorro	LINEAR	HYG	8.9 km	MPC; JPL
14177	1998 VU_{29}	—	November 10, 1998	Socorro	LINEAR	·	4.6 km	MPC; JPL
14178	1998 VK_{30}	—	November 10, 1998	Socorro	LINEAR	KOR	4.5 km	MPC; JPL
14179 Skinner	1998 VM_{32}	Skinner	November 15, 1998	Cocoa	I. P. Griffin	·	8.5 km	MPC; JPL
14180	1998 WY_{5}	—	November 20, 1998	Oizumi	T. Kobayashi	·	8.5 km	MPC; JPL
14181 Koromházi	1998 WX_{6}	Koromházi	November 20, 1998	Piszkéstető	K. Sárneczky, L. Kiss	·	11 km	MPC; JPL
14182 Alley	1998 WG_{12}	Alley	November 21, 1998	Socorro	LINEAR	V	2.2 km	MPC; JPL
14183	1998 WA_{18}	—	November 21, 1998	Socorro	LINEAR	·	8.4 km	MPC; JPL
14184	1998 WA_{32}	—	November 21, 1998	Socorro	LINEAR	KOR	5.9 km	MPC; JPL
14185 Van Ness	1998 WK_{32}	Van Ness	November 21, 1998	Anderson Mesa	LONEOS	·	5.4 km	MPC; JPL
14186 Virgiliofos	1998 XP_{2}	Virgiliofos	December 7, 1998	Pian dei Termini	A. Boattini, L. Tesi	·	12 km	MPC; JPL
14187	1998 XS_{9}	—	December 14, 1998	Višnjan Observatory	K. Korlević	·	4.1 km	MPC; JPL
14188	1998 XP_{11}	—	December 13, 1998	Oizumi	T. Kobayashi	EOS	6.8 km	MPC; JPL
14189 Sèvre	1998 XB_{14}	Sèvre	December 15, 1998	Caussols	ODAS	·	6.3 km	MPC; JPL
14190 Soldán	1998 XS_{15}	Soldán	December 15, 1998	Kleť	M. Tichý, Z. Moravec	·	13 km	MPC; JPL
14191	1998 XR_{28}	—	December 14, 1998	Socorro	LINEAR	·	3.8 km	MPC; JPL
14192	1998 XA_{33}	—	December 14, 1998	Socorro	LINEAR	EOS	8.5 km	MPC; JPL
14193	1998 XZ_{40}	—	December 14, 1998	Socorro	LINEAR	·	8.6 km	MPC; JPL
14194	1998 XU_{50}	—	December 14, 1998	Socorro	LINEAR	·	12 km	MPC; JPL
14195	1998 XD_{51}	—	December 14, 1998	Socorro	LINEAR	HIL · 3:2 · (6124)	21 km	MPC; JPL
14196	1998 XH_{59}	—	December 15, 1998	Socorro	LINEAR	·	4.5 km	MPC; JPL
14197	1998 XK_{72}	—	December 14, 1998	Socorro	LINEAR	·	8.1 km	MPC; JPL
14198	1998 XZ_{73}	—	December 14, 1998	Socorro	LINEAR	·	10 km	MPC; JPL
14199	1998 XV_{77}	—	December 15, 1998	Socorro	LINEAR	PHO	9.0 km	MPC; JPL
14200	1998 XY_{77}	—	December 15, 1998	Socorro	LINEAR	·	7.3 km	MPC; JPL

== 14201–14300 ==
back to top

Designation			Discovery			Properties		Ref
Permanent	Provisional	Named after	Date	Site	Discoverer(s)	Category	Diam.	Ref
14201	1998 XR_{92}	—	December 15, 1998	Socorro	LINEAR	EUN	8.1 km	MPC; JPL
14202	1998 YF_{3}	—	December 17, 1998	Oizumi	T. Kobayashi	RAF	5.8 km	MPC; JPL
14203 Hocking	1998 YT_{20}	Hocking	December 25, 1998	Kitt Peak	Spacewatch	EOS	9.3 km	MPC; JPL
14204	1999 AM_{20}	—	January 12, 1999	Woomera	F. B. Zoltowski	EOS · slow	9.3 km	MPC; JPL
14205	1999 BC_{4}	—	January 18, 1999	Gekko	T. Kagawa	·	8.2 km	MPC; JPL
14206 Sehnal	1999 CL_{10}	Sehnal	February 15, 1999	Kleť	M. Tichý, Z. Moravec	·	15 km	MPC; JPL
14207	1999 CS_{18}	—	February 10, 1999	Socorro	LINEAR	EOS	12 km	MPC; JPL
14208	1999 CR_{64}	—	February 12, 1999	Socorro	LINEAR	EUN	19 km	MPC; JPL
14209	1999 CV_{81}	—	February 12, 1999	Socorro	LINEAR	·	3.0 km	MPC; JPL
14210	1999 CO_{99}	—	February 10, 1999	Socorro	LINEAR	EUN	6.0 km	MPC; JPL
14211	1999 NT_{1}	—	July 12, 1999	Socorro	LINEAR	·	5.0 km	MPC; JPL
14212	1999 NW_{39}	—	July 14, 1999	Socorro	LINEAR	EUN	3.4 km	MPC; JPL
14213	1999 NX_{54}	—	July 12, 1999	Socorro	LINEAR	·	13 km	MPC; JPL
14214 Hirsch	1999 RP_{86}	Hirsch	September 7, 1999	Socorro	LINEAR	·	2.9 km	MPC; JPL
14215	1999 TV_{6}	—	October 6, 1999	Višnjan Observatory	K. Korlević, M. Jurić	·	8.2 km	MPC; JPL
14216	1999 VW_{1}	—	November 4, 1999	Gekko	T. Kagawa	·	5.4 km	MPC; JPL
14217 Oaxaca	1999 VV_{19}	Oaxaca	November 10, 1999	Oaxaca	Roe, J. M.	NYS	1.7 km	MPC; JPL
14218	1999 VS_{30}	—	November 3, 1999	Socorro	LINEAR	V	3.2 km	MPC; JPL
14219	1999 VY_{77}	—	November 3, 1999	Socorro	LINEAR	·	5.2 km	MPC; JPL
14220 Alexgibbs	1999 VE_{115}	Alexgibbs	November 9, 1999	Catalina	CSS	ADE	21 km	MPC; JPL
14221	1999 WL	—	November 16, 1999	Oizumi	T. Kobayashi	(883)	3.5 km	MPC; JPL
14222	1999 WS_{1}	—	November 25, 1999	Višnjan Observatory	K. Korlević	T_{j} (2.92)	6.7 km	MPC; JPL
14223 Dolby	1999 XW_{1}	Dolby	December 3, 1999	Fountain Hills	C. W. Juels	·	4.3 km	MPC; JPL
14224 Gaede	1999 XU_{33}	Gaede	December 6, 1999	Socorro	LINEAR	·	5.0 km	MPC; JPL
14225 Alisahamilton	1999 XZ_{49}	Alisahamilton	December 7, 1999	Socorro	LINEAR	NYS	3.3 km	MPC; JPL
14226 Hamura	1999 XR_{50}	Hamura	December 7, 1999	Socorro	LINEAR	·	2.7 km	MPC; JPL
14227	1999 XW_{85}	—	December 7, 1999	Socorro	LINEAR	THM	18 km	MPC; JPL
14228	1999 XQ_{88}	—	December 7, 1999	Socorro	LINEAR	·	4.3 km	MPC; JPL
14229	1999 XV_{94}	—	December 7, 1999	Socorro	LINEAR	·	4.0 km	MPC; JPL
14230 Mariahines	1999 XF_{100}	Mariahines	December 7, 1999	Socorro	LINEAR	·	3.1 km	MPC; JPL
14231	1999 XD_{102}	—	December 7, 1999	Socorro	LINEAR	·	9.8 km	MPC; JPL
14232 Curtismiller	1999 XJ_{120}	Curtismiller	December 5, 1999	Catalina	CSS	EUN	6.0 km	MPC; JPL
14233	1999 XM_{169}	—	December 10, 1999	Socorro	LINEAR	MAR	7.0 km	MPC; JPL
14234 Davidhoover	1999 XZ_{182}	Davidhoover	December 12, 1999	Socorro	LINEAR	·	2.5 km	MPC; JPL
14235	1999 XA_{187}	—	December 12, 1999	Socorro	LINEAR	L4	29 km	MPC; JPL
14236	1999 XZ_{200}	—	December 12, 1999	Socorro	LINEAR	·	5.4 km	MPC; JPL
14237	1999 YU_{9}	—	December 31, 1999	Oizumi	T. Kobayashi	·	7.8 km	MPC; JPL
14238 d'Artagnan	1999 YX_{13}	d'Artagnan	December 31, 1999	Fountain Hills	C. W. Juels	·	8.1 km	MPC; JPL
14239	2000 AL_{2}	—	January 3, 2000	Oizumi	T. Kobayashi	·	9.6 km	MPC; JPL
14240	2000 AP_{2}	—	January 3, 2000	Oizumi	T. Kobayashi	V	2.7 km	MPC; JPL
14241	2000 AO_{5}	—	January 5, 2000	Višnjan Observatory	K. Korlević	·	15 km	MPC; JPL
14242	2000 AE_{25}	—	January 3, 2000	Socorro	LINEAR	THM	8.4 km	MPC; JPL
14243	2000 AH_{29}	—	January 3, 2000	Socorro	LINEAR	KOR	3.7 km	MPC; JPL
14244 Labnow	2000 AT_{29}	Labnow	January 3, 2000	Socorro	LINEAR	·	3.5 km	MPC; JPL
14245	2000 AS_{31}	—	January 3, 2000	Socorro	LINEAR	·	6.9 km	MPC; JPL
14246	2000 AN_{50}	—	January 6, 2000	Višnjan Observatory	K. Korlević	KOR	6.8 km	MPC; JPL
14247	2000 AV_{55}	—	January 4, 2000	Socorro	LINEAR	NYS	5.6 km	MPC; JPL
14248	2000 AF_{56}	—	January 4, 2000	Socorro	LINEAR	THM	11 km	MPC; JPL
14249	2000 AW_{57}	—	January 4, 2000	Socorro	LINEAR	·	12 km	MPC; JPL
14250 Kathleenmartin	2000 AJ_{63}	Kathleenmartin	January 4, 2000	Socorro	LINEAR	(2076)	2.8 km	MPC; JPL
14251	2000 AX_{63}	—	January 4, 2000	Socorro	LINEAR	EOS	8.2 km	MPC; JPL
14252 Audreymeyer	2000 AD_{64}	Audreymeyer	January 4, 2000	Socorro	LINEAR	·	2.3 km	MPC; JPL
14253	2000 AL_{64}	—	January 4, 2000	Socorro	LINEAR	·	4.7 km	MPC; JPL
14254	2000 AT_{64}	—	January 4, 2000	Socorro	LINEAR	slow	20 km	MPC; JPL
14255	2000 AS_{70}	—	January 5, 2000	Socorro	LINEAR	DOR	13 km	MPC; JPL
14256	2000 AA_{96}	—	January 4, 2000	Socorro	LINEAR	KOR	5.2 km	MPC; JPL
14257	2000 AR_{97}	—	January 4, 2000	Socorro	LINEAR	·	7.2 km	MPC; JPL
14258 Katrinaminck	2000 AM_{116}	Katrinaminck	January 5, 2000	Socorro	LINEAR	·	5.6 km	MPC; JPL
14259	2000 AQ_{117}	—	January 5, 2000	Socorro	LINEAR	·	10 km	MPC; JPL
14260	2000 AF_{119}	—	January 5, 2000	Socorro	LINEAR	EOS	8.6 km	MPC; JPL
14261	2000 AB_{121}	—	January 5, 2000	Socorro	LINEAR	EOS	8.5 km	MPC; JPL
14262 Kratzer	2000 AC_{125}	Kratzer	January 5, 2000	Socorro	LINEAR	·	5.2 km	MPC; JPL
14263	2000 AA_{127}	—	January 5, 2000	Socorro	LINEAR	KOR	6.9 km	MPC; JPL
14264	2000 AH_{142}	—	January 5, 2000	Socorro	LINEAR	VER	12 km	MPC; JPL
14265	2000 AV_{142}	—	January 5, 2000	Socorro	LINEAR	HYG	10 km	MPC; JPL
14266	2000 AG_{143}	—	January 5, 2000	Socorro	LINEAR	·	5.8 km	MPC; JPL
14267 Zook	2000 AJ_{153}	Zook	January 6, 2000	Anderson Mesa	LONEOS	·	4.5 km	MPC; JPL
14268 Azeus	2000 AK_{156}	Azeus	January 3, 2000	Socorro	LINEAR	L4	58 km	MPC; JPL
14269	2000 AH_{182}	—	January 7, 2000	Socorro	LINEAR	GEF	6.6 km	MPC; JPL
14270	2000 AB_{189}	—	January 8, 2000	Socorro	LINEAR	·	7.6 km	MPC; JPL
14271	2000 AN_{233}	—	January 4, 2000	Socorro	LINEAR	KOR	6.5 km	MPC; JPL
14272	2000 AZ_{234}	—	January 5, 2000	Socorro	LINEAR	CYB	9.6 km	MPC; JPL
14273	2000 BY_{14}	—	January 31, 2000	Oizumi	T. Kobayashi	·	4.3 km	MPC; JPL
14274 Landstreet	2000 BL_{21}	Landstreet	January 29, 2000	Kitt Peak	Spacewatch	URS	21 km	MPC; JPL
14275 Dianemurray	2000 BR_{26}	Dianemurray	January 30, 2000	Socorro	LINEAR	·	4.2 km	MPC; JPL
14276	2000 CF_{2}	—	February 2, 2000	Oizumi	T. Kobayashi	(883)	6.0 km	MPC; JPL
14277 Parsa	2000 CS_{13}	Parsa	February 2, 2000	Socorro	LINEAR	AGN	2.9 km	MPC; JPL
14278 Perrenot	2000 CV_{29}	Perrenot	February 2, 2000	Socorro	LINEAR	·	2.8 km	MPC; JPL
14279	2000 CD_{65}	—	February 3, 2000	Socorro	LINEAR	THM	9.4 km	MPC; JPL
14280	2000 CN_{72}	—	February 6, 2000	Višnjan Observatory	K. Korlević	KOR	5.9 km	MPC; JPL
14281	2000 CR_{92}	—	February 6, 2000	Socorro	LINEAR	KOR	6.6 km	MPC; JPL
14282 Cruijff	2097 P-L	Cruijff	September 24, 1960	Palomar	C. J. van Houten, I. van Houten-Groeneveld, T. Gehrels	·	5.4 km	MPC; JPL
14283	2206 P-L	—	September 24, 1960	Palomar	C. J. van Houten, I. van Houten-Groeneveld, T. Gehrels	·	4.4 km	MPC; JPL
14284	2530 P-L	—	September 24, 1960	Palomar	C. J. van Houten, I. van Houten-Groeneveld, T. Gehrels	·	3.9 km	MPC; JPL
14285	2566 P-L	—	September 24, 1960	Palomar	C. J. van Houten, I. van Houten-Groeneveld, T. Gehrels	NYS	3.4 km	MPC; JPL
14286	2577 P-L	—	September 24, 1960	Palomar	C. J. van Houten, I. van Houten-Groeneveld, T. Gehrels	·	3.8 km	MPC; JPL
14287	2777 P-L	—	September 24, 1960	Palomar	C. J. van Houten, I. van Houten-Groeneveld, T. Gehrels	NYS	3.2 km	MPC; JPL
14288	2796 P-L	—	September 26, 1960	Palomar	C. J. van Houten, I. van Houten-Groeneveld, T. Gehrels	·	3.3 km	MPC; JPL
14289	4648 P-L	—	September 24, 1960	Palomar	C. J. van Houten, I. van Houten-Groeneveld, T. Gehrels	MAS	2.4 km	MPC; JPL
14290	9072 P-L	—	October 17, 1960	Palomar	C. J. van Houten, I. van Houten-Groeneveld, T. Gehrels	·	5.6 km	MPC; JPL
14291 Savereide	1104 T-1	Savereide	March 25, 1971	Palomar	C. J. van Houten, I. van Houten-Groeneveld, T. Gehrels	·	6.6 km	MPC; JPL
14292	1148 T-1	—	March 25, 1971	Palomar	C. J. van Houten, I. van Houten-Groeneveld, T. Gehrels	·	1.8 km	MPC; JPL
14293	2307 T-1	—	March 25, 1971	Palomar	C. J. van Houten, I. van Houten-Groeneveld, T. Gehrels	·	3.5 km	MPC; JPL
14294	3306 T-1	—	March 26, 1971	Palomar	C. J. van Houten, I. van Houten-Groeneveld, T. Gehrels	NYS	3.7 km	MPC; JPL
14295	4161 T-1	—	March 26, 1971	Palomar	C. J. van Houten, I. van Houten-Groeneveld, T. Gehrels	MAR	5.3 km	MPC; JPL
14296	4298 T-1	—	March 26, 1971	Palomar	C. J. van Houten, I. van Houten-Groeneveld, T. Gehrels	NYS ·	5.2 km	MPC; JPL
14297	2124 T-2	—	September 29, 1973	Palomar	C. J. van Houten, I. van Houten-Groeneveld, T. Gehrels	·	2.8 km	MPC; JPL
14298	2144 T-2	—	September 29, 1973	Palomar	C. J. van Houten, I. van Houten-Groeneveld, T. Gehrels	·	3.9 km	MPC; JPL
14299	3162 T-2	—	September 30, 1973	Palomar	C. J. van Houten, I. van Houten-Groeneveld, T. Gehrels	EUN	5.1 km	MPC; JPL
14300	3336 T-2	—	September 25, 1973	Palomar	C. J. van Houten, I. van Houten-Groeneveld, T. Gehrels	·	3.5 km	MPC; JPL

== 14301–14400 ==
back to top

Designation			Discovery			Properties		Ref
Permanent	Provisional	Named after	Date	Site	Discoverer(s)	Category	Diam.	Ref
14301	5205 T-2	—	September 25, 1973	Palomar	C. J. van Houten, I. van Houten-Groeneveld, T. Gehrels	·	4.5 km	MPC; JPL
14302	5482 T-2	—	September 30, 1973	Palomar	C. J. van Houten, I. van Houten-Groeneveld, T. Gehrels	·	4.3 km	MPC; JPL
14303	1144 T-3	—	October 17, 1977	Palomar	C. J. van Houten, I. van Houten-Groeneveld, T. Gehrels	EOS	5.4 km	MPC; JPL
14304	3417 T-3	—	October 16, 1977	Palomar	C. J. van Houten, I. van Houten-Groeneveld, T. Gehrels	·	5.3 km	MPC; JPL
14305	3437 T-3	—	October 16, 1977	Palomar	C. J. van Houten, I. van Houten-Groeneveld, T. Gehrels	·	4.2 km	MPC; JPL
14306	4327 T-3	—	October 16, 1977	Palomar	C. J. van Houten, I. van Houten-Groeneveld, T. Gehrels	·	8.1 km	MPC; JPL
14307	4336 T-3	—	October 16, 1977	Palomar	C. J. van Houten, I. van Houten-Groeneveld, T. Gehrels	·	2.1 km	MPC; JPL
14308 Hardeman	5193 T-3	Hardeman	October 16, 1977	Palomar	C. J. van Houten, I. van Houten-Groeneveld, T. Gehrels	·	9.6 km	MPC; JPL
14309 Defoy	A908 SA	Defoy	September 22, 1908	Vienna	J. Palisa	·	5.2 km	MPC; JPL
14310 Shuttleworth	1966 PP	Shuttleworth	August 7, 1966	Bloemfontein	Boyden Observatory	·	6.9 km	MPC; JPL
14311	1971 UK_{1}	—	October 26, 1971	Hamburg-Bergedorf	L. Kohoutek	·	4.0 km	MPC; JPL
14312 Polytech	1976 UN_{2}	Polytech	October 26, 1976	Nauchnij	T. M. Smirnova	·	2.8 km	MPC; JPL
14313 Dodaira	1976 UZ_{7}	Dodaira	October 22, 1976	Kiso	H. Kosai, K. Furukawa	EOS	8.0 km	MPC; JPL
14314 Tokigawa	1977 DQ_{3}	Tokigawa	February 18, 1977	Kiso	H. Kosai, K. Furukawa	THM	9.4 km	MPC; JPL
14315 Ogawamachi	1977 EL_{5}	Ogawamachi	March 12, 1977	Kiso	H. Kosai, K. Furukawa	·	15 km	MPC; JPL
14316 Higashichichibu	1977 ES_{7}	Higashichichibu	March 12, 1977	Kiso	H. Kosai, K. Furukawa	·	18 km	MPC; JPL
14317 Antonov	1978 PC_{3}	Antonov	August 8, 1978	Nauchnij	N. S. Chernykh	·	3.9 km	MPC; JPL
14318 Buzinov	1978 SD_{3}	Buzinov	September 26, 1978	Nauchnij	L. V. Zhuravleva	·	3.0 km	MPC; JPL
14319	1978 US_{5}	—	October 27, 1978	Palomar	C. M. Olmstead	·	4.2 km	MPC; JPL
14320	1978 UV_{7}	—	October 27, 1978	Palomar	C. M. Olmstead	·	8.3 km	MPC; JPL
14321	1978 VT_{9}	—	November 7, 1978	Palomar	E. F. Helin, S. J. Bus	·	2.0 km	MPC; JPL
14322 Shakura	1978 YM	Shakura	December 22, 1978	Nauchnij	N. S. Chernykh	·	3.5 km	MPC; JPL
14323	1979 MV_{1}	—	June 25, 1979	Siding Spring	E. F. Helin, S. J. Bus	·	2.3 km	MPC; JPL
14324	1979 MK_{6}	—	June 25, 1979	Siding Spring	E. F. Helin, S. J. Bus	·	4.0 km	MPC; JPL
14325	1979 MM_{6}	—	June 25, 1979	Siding Spring	E. F. Helin, S. J. Bus	HYG	8.6 km	MPC; JPL
14326	1980 BA	—	January 21, 1980	Harvard Observatory	Harvard Observatory	·	5.4 km	MPC; JPL
14327 Lemke	1980 FE_{2}	Lemke	March 16, 1980	La Silla	C.-I. Lagerkvist	·	9.2 km	MPC; JPL
14328 Granvik	1980 VH	Granvik	November 8, 1980	Anderson Mesa	E. Bowell	·	8.3 km	MPC; JPL
14329 Michellethompson	1981 EY_{10}	Michellethompson	March 1, 1981	Siding Spring	S. J. Bus	·	3.3 km	MPC; JPL
14330 Tomlehrer	1981 EG_{21}	Tomlehrer	March 2, 1981	Siding Spring	S. J. Bus	CYB	10 km	MPC; JPL
14331 Alyankovic	1981 EC_{26}	Alyankovic	March 2, 1981	Siding Spring	S. J. Bus	MAS	1.5 km	MPC; JPL
14332 Brucebarnett	1981 EX_{26}	Brucebarnett	March 2, 1981	Siding Spring	S. J. Bus	·	5.0 km	MPC; JPL
14333 Alanfischer	1981 ED_{34}	Alanfischer	March 1, 1981	Siding Spring	S. J. Bus	·	3.2 km	MPC; JPL
14334 Lindarueger	1981 EE_{38}	Lindarueger	March 1, 1981	Siding Spring	S. J. Bus	·	6.5 km	MPC; JPL
14335 Alexosipov	1981 RR_{3}	Alexosipov	September 3, 1981	Nauchnij	N. S. Chernykh	·	4.2 km	MPC; JPL
14336 Falquero	1981 UU_{29}	Falquero	October 24, 1981	Palomar	S. J. Bus	·	1.9 km	MPC; JPL
14337	1981 WJ_{9}	—	November 16, 1981	Bickley	Perth Observatory	(5)	4.7 km	MPC; JPL
14338 Shibakoukan	1982 VP_{3}	Shibakoukan	November 14, 1982	Kiso	H. Kosai, K. Furukawa	·	8.7 km	MPC; JPL
14339 Knorre	1983 GU	Knorre	April 10, 1983	Nauchnij	L. I. Chernykh	EUN	9.8 km	MPC; JPL
14340	1983 RQ_{3}	—	September 2, 1983	La Silla	H. Debehogne	ERI	6.2 km	MPC; JPL
14341	1983 RV_{3}	—	September 4, 1983	La Silla	H. Debehogne	·	13 km	MPC; JPL
14342 Iglika	1984 SL	Iglika	September 23, 1984	Smolyan	V. G. Ivanova, V. G. Shkodrov	CLO	14 km	MPC; JPL
14343	1984 SM_{5}	—	September 18, 1984	La Silla	H. Debehogne	·	4.2 km	MPC; JPL
14344	1985 CP_{2}	—	February 15, 1985	La Silla	H. Debehogne	NYS	4.3 km	MPC; JPL
14345 Gritsevich	1985 PO	Gritsevich	August 14, 1985	Anderson Mesa	E. Bowell	·	5.2 km	MPC; JPL
14346 Zhilyaev	1985 QG_{5}	Zhilyaev	August 23, 1985	Nauchnij	N. S. Chernykh	·	13 km	MPC; JPL
14347	1985 RL_{4}	—	September 11, 1985	La Silla	H. Debehogne	·	2.6 km	MPC; JPL
14348 Cumming	1985 UO_{3}	Cumming	October 20, 1985	Kvistaberg	C.-I. Lagerkvist	HNS	6.3 km	MPC; JPL
14349 Nikitamikhalkov	1985 UQ_{4}	Nikitamikhalkov	October 22, 1985	Nauchnij	L. V. Zhuravleva	THM	12 km	MPC; JPL
14350	1985 VA_{1}	—	November 1, 1985	La Silla	R. M. West	URS	7.1 km	MPC; JPL
14351 Tomaskohout	1986 RF_{3}	Tomaskohout	September 6, 1986	Anderson Mesa	E. Bowell	NYS	3.6 km	MPC; JPL
14352	1987 DK_{6}	—	February 23, 1987	La Silla	H. Debehogne	·	3.3 km	MPC; JPL
14353	1987 DN_{6}	—	February 23, 1987	La Silla	H. Debehogne	·	6.8 km	MPC; JPL
14354 Kolesnikov	1987 QX_{7}	Kolesnikov	August 21, 1987	La Silla	E. W. Elst	·	9.6 km	MPC; JPL
14355	1987 SL_{5}	—	September 30, 1987	Brorfelde	P. Jensen	ERI	6.9 km	MPC; JPL
14356	1987 SF_{6}	—	September 21, 1987	Kleť	Z. Vávrová	·	6.9 km	MPC; JPL
14357	1987 UR	—	October 22, 1987	Toyota	K. Suzuki, T. Urata	slow	9.6 km	MPC; JPL
14358	1988 BY_{3}	—	January 19, 1988	La Silla	H. Debehogne	·	3.5 km	MPC; JPL
14359	1988 CU_{1}	—	February 11, 1988	La Silla	E. W. Elst	NYS	4.6 km	MPC; JPL
14360 Ipatov	1988 CV_{4}	Ipatov	February 13, 1988	La Silla	E. W. Elst	·	17 km	MPC; JPL
14361 Boscovich	1988 DE	Boscovich	February 17, 1988	Bologna	San Vittore	EUN · slow	7.6 km	MPC; JPL
14362	1988 MH	—	June 16, 1988	Palomar	E. F. Helin	EUN	8.5 km	MPC; JPL
14363	1988 RB_{2}	—	September 8, 1988	Kleť	A. Mrkos	·	3.0 km	MPC; JPL
14364	1988 RM_{2}	—	September 8, 1988	Brorfelde	P. Jensen	BAP	3.8 km	MPC; JPL
14365 Jeanpaul	1988 RZ_{2}	Jeanpaul	September 8, 1988	Tautenburg Observatory	F. Börngen	·	3.2 km	MPC; JPL
14366 Wilhelmraabe	1988 RX_{3}	Wilhelmraabe	September 8, 1988	Tautenburg Observatory	F. Börngen	HOF	7.2 km	MPC; JPL
14367 Hippokrates	1988 RY_{3}	Hippokrates	September 8, 1988	Tautenburg Observatory	F. Börngen	THM	6.3 km	MPC; JPL
14368	1988 TK	—	October 3, 1988	Kushiro	S. Ueda, H. Kaneda	·	6.4 km	MPC; JPL
14369	1988 UV	—	October 18, 1988	Kushiro	S. Ueda, H. Kaneda	·	3.5 km	MPC; JPL
14370	1988 VR_{2}	—	November 12, 1988	Palomar	E. F. Helin	·	4.9 km	MPC; JPL
14371	1988 XX_{2}	—	December 12, 1988	Brorfelde	P. Jensen	·	2.4 km	MPC; JPL
14372 Paulgerhardt	1989 AD_{6}	Paulgerhardt	January 9, 1989	Tautenburg Observatory	F. Börngen	EOS	7.2 km	MPC; JPL
14373	1989 LT	—	June 3, 1989	Palomar	E. F. Helin	·	4.8 km	MPC; JPL
14374	1989 SA	—	September 21, 1989	Siding Spring	R. H. McNaught	EUN	5.7 km	MPC; JPL
14375	1989 SU	—	September 29, 1989	Kushiro	S. Ueda, H. Kaneda	·	5.8 km	MPC; JPL
14376	1989 ST_{10}	—	September 28, 1989	La Silla	H. Debehogne	·	7.4 km	MPC; JPL
14377	1989 TX_{2}	—	October 7, 1989	La Silla	E. W. Elst	MAR	5.6 km	MPC; JPL
14378	1989 TA_{16}	—	October 4, 1989	La Silla	H. Debehogne	(5)	4.6 km	MPC; JPL
14379	1989 UM_{4}	—	October 22, 1989	Kleť	A. Mrkos	EUN	7.1 km	MPC; JPL
14380 Bussey	1989 UC_{6}	Bussey	October 30, 1989	Cerro Tololo	S. J. Bus	·	18 km	MPC; JPL
14381	1990 CE	—	February 1, 1990	Dynic	A. Sugie	(2076)	3.7 km	MPC; JPL
14382 Woszczyk	1990 ES_{6}	Woszczyk	March 2, 1990	La Silla	H. Debehogne	KOR	5.8 km	MPC; JPL
14383	1990 OY_{3}	—	July 27, 1990	Palomar	H. E. Holt	V	3.2 km	MPC; JPL
14384	1990 OH_{4}	—	July 24, 1990	Palomar	H. E. Holt	·	8.5 km	MPC; JPL
14385	1990 QG_{1}	—	August 22, 1990	Palomar	H. E. Holt	V	3.1 km	MPC; JPL
14386	1990 QN_{2}	—	August 22, 1990	Palomar	H. E. Holt	V	2.9 km	MPC; JPL
14387	1990 QE_{5}	—	August 25, 1990	Palomar	H. E. Holt	V	2.9 km	MPC; JPL
14388	1990 QO_{5}	—	August 29, 1990	Palomar	H. E. Holt	·	4.8 km	MPC; JPL
14389	1990 QR_{5}	—	August 26, 1990	Palomar	H. E. Holt	THM	12 km	MPC; JPL
14390	1990 QP_{10}	—	August 26, 1990	Palomar	H. E. Holt	·	11 km	MPC; JPL
14391	1990 RE_{2}	—	September 14, 1990	Palomar	H. E. Holt	·	6.7 km	MPC; JPL
14392	1990 RS_{6}	—	September 11, 1990	La Silla	H. Debehogne	V · slow	2.4 km	MPC; JPL
14393	1990 SX_{6}	—	September 22, 1990	La Silla	E. W. Elst	·	3.2 km	MPC; JPL
14394	1990 SP_{15}	—	September 18, 1990	Palomar	H. E. Holt	·	21 km	MPC; JPL
14395 Tommorgan	1990 TN_{3}	Tommorgan	October 15, 1990	Palomar	E. F. Helin	H	1.8 km	MPC; JPL
14396	1990 UX_{4}	—	October 16, 1990	La Silla	E. W. Elst	·	7.6 km	MPC; JPL
14397	1990 VS_{4}	—	November 15, 1990	La Silla	E. W. Elst	EUN	4.1 km	MPC; JPL
14398	1990 VT_{6}	—	November 14, 1990	La Silla	E. W. Elst	·	5.6 km	MPC; JPL
14399	1990 WN_{4}	—	November 16, 1990	La Silla	E. W. Elst	slow	3.9 km	MPC; JPL
14400 Baudot	1990 WO_{4}	Baudot	November 16, 1990	La Silla	E. W. Elst	·	5.4 km	MPC; JPL

== 14401–14500 ==
back to top

Designation			Discovery			Properties		Ref
Permanent	Provisional	Named after	Date	Site	Discoverer(s)	Category	Diam.	Ref
14401 Reikoyukawa	1990 XV	Reikoyukawa	December 15, 1990	Kitami	K. Endate, K. Watanabe	EUN	6.6 km	MPC; JPL
14402	1991 DB	—	February 18, 1991	Palomar	E. F. Helin	AMO	600 m	MPC; JPL
14403 de Machault	1991 GM_{8}	de Machault	April 8, 1991	La Silla	E. W. Elst	·	7.5 km	MPC; JPL
14404	1991 NQ_{6}	—	July 11, 1991	La Silla	H. Debehogne	·	3.3 km	MPC; JPL
14405	1991 PE_{8}	—	August 5, 1991	Palomar	H. E. Holt	MAS	2.5 km	MPC; JPL
14406	1991 PP_{8}	—	August 5, 1991	Palomar	H. E. Holt	THM	10 km	MPC; JPL
14407	1991 PQ_{8}	—	August 5, 1991	Palomar	H. E. Holt	·	4.4 km	MPC; JPL
14408	1991 PC_{16}	—	August 6, 1991	Palomar	H. E. Holt	·	9.3 km	MPC; JPL
14409	1991 RM_{1}	—	September 5, 1991	Siding Spring	R. H. McNaught	T_{j} (2.98)	20 km	MPC; JPL
14410	1991 RR_{1}	—	September 7, 1991	Kushiro	S. Ueda, H. Kaneda	EOS	10 km	MPC; JPL
14411 Clérambault	1991 RE_{2}	Clérambault	September 6, 1991	Haute Provence	E. W. Elst	(2076)	4.2 km	MPC; JPL
14412 Wolflojewski	1991 RU_{2}	Wolflojewski	September 9, 1991	Tautenburg Observatory	L. D. Schmadel, F. Börngen	(2076)	4.0 km	MPC; JPL
14413 Geiger	1991 RT_{3}	Geiger	September 5, 1991	Tautenburg Observatory	F. Börngen, L. D. Schmadel	·	3.8 km	MPC; JPL
14414	1991 RF_{6}	—	September 13, 1991	Palomar	H. E. Holt	·	2.8 km	MPC; JPL
14415	1991 RQ_{7}	—	September 13, 1991	Kushiro	S. Ueda, H. Kaneda	·	7.8 km	MPC; JPL
14416	1991 RU_{7}	—	September 8, 1991	Harvard Observatory	Oak Ridge Observatory	·	2.2 km	MPC; JPL
14417	1991 RN_{13}	—	September 13, 1991	Palomar	H. E. Holt	·	2.4 km	MPC; JPL
14418	1991 RU_{16}	—	September 15, 1991	Palomar	H. E. Holt	·	2.2 km	MPC; JPL
14419	1991 RK_{23}	—	September 15, 1991	Palomar	H. E. Holt	·	3.3 km	MPC; JPL
14420 Massey	1991 SM	Massey	September 30, 1991	Siding Spring	R. H. McNaught	EOS	9.9 km	MPC; JPL
14421	1991 SA_{1}	—	September 30, 1991	Siding Spring	R. H. McNaught	·	5.5 km	MPC; JPL
14422	1991 SK_{2}	—	September 16, 1991	Palomar	H. E. Holt	EOS	7.1 km	MPC; JPL
14423	1991 SM_{2}	—	September 16, 1991	Palomar	H. E. Holt	·	3.1 km	MPC; JPL
14424 Laval	1991 SR_{3}	Laval	September 30, 1991	Kitt Peak	Spacewatch	·	13 km	MPC; JPL
14425 Fujimimachi	1991 TJ_{2}	Fujimimachi	October 13, 1991	Nyukasa	M. Hirasawa, S. Suzuki	·	4.1 km	MPC; JPL
14426 Katotsuyoshi	1991 UO_{2}	Katotsuyoshi	October 29, 1991	Kitami	K. Endate, K. Watanabe	·	11 km	MPC; JPL
14427	1991 VJ_{2}	—	November 9, 1991	Kushiro	S. Ueda, H. Kaneda	·	3.5 km	MPC; JPL
14428 Lazaridis	1991 VM_{12}	Lazaridis	November 8, 1991	Kitt Peak	Spacewatch	·	11 km	MPC; JPL
14429 Coyne	1991 XC	Coyne	December 3, 1991	Palomar	C. S. Shoemaker, D. H. Levy	·	3.7 km	MPC; JPL
14430	1992 CH	—	February 10, 1992	Uenohara	N. Kawasato	EUN	6.5 km	MPC; JPL
14431	1992 DX_{8}	—	February 29, 1992	La Silla	UESAC	·	4.3 km	MPC; JPL
14432	1992 EA_{6}	—	March 2, 1992	La Silla	UESAC	·	4.3 km	MPC; JPL
14433	1992 EE_{8}	—	March 2, 1992	La Silla	UESAC	V	2.3 km	MPC; JPL
14434	1992 ER_{11}	—	March 6, 1992	La Silla	UESAC	·	9.7 km	MPC; JPL
14435	1992 ED_{13}	—	March 2, 1992	La Silla	UESAC	V · fast	2.6 km	MPC; JPL
14436 Morishita	1992 FC_{2}	Morishita	March 23, 1992	Kitami	K. Endate, K. Watanabe	slow	5.7 km	MPC; JPL
14437	1992 GD_{3}	—	April 4, 1992	La Silla	E. W. Elst	·	4.8 km	MPC; JPL
14438 MacLean	1992 HC_{2}	MacLean	April 27, 1992	Kitt Peak	Spacewatch	KOR	4.4 km	MPC; JPL
14439 Evermeersch	1992 RE_{2}	Evermeersch	September 2, 1992	La Silla	E. W. Elst	KOR	5.1 km	MPC; JPL
14440	1992 RF_{5}	—	September 2, 1992	La Silla	E. W. Elst	·	4.1 km	MPC; JPL
14441 Atakanoseki	1992 SJ	Atakanoseki	September 21, 1992	Kitami	M. Yanai, K. Watanabe	CLO	8.6 km	MPC; JPL
14442	1992 SR_{25}	—	September 30, 1992	Palomar	H. E. Holt	EOS	6.9 km	MPC; JPL
14443 Sekinenomatsu	1992 TV	Sekinenomatsu	October 1, 1992	Kitami	M. Yanai, K. Watanabe	KOR	5.9 km	MPC; JPL
14444	1992 TG_{1}	—	October 2, 1992	Dynic	A. Sugie	BAP	4.0 km	MPC; JPL
14445 Koichi	1992 UZ_{3}	Koichi	October 26, 1992	Kitami	K. Endate, K. Watanabe	·	9.7 km	MPC; JPL
14446 Kinkowan	1992 UP_{6}	Kinkowan	October 31, 1992	Kagoshima	M. Mukai, Takeishi, M.	·	12 km	MPC; JPL
14447 Hosakakanai	1992 VL	Hosakakanai	November 2, 1992	Kitami	K. Endate, K. Watanabe	·	7.9 km	MPC; JPL
14448	1992 VQ	—	November 2, 1992	Kushiro	S. Ueda, H. Kaneda	THM	11 km	MPC; JPL
14449 Myogizinzya	1992 WE_{1}	Myogizinzya	November 16, 1992	Kitami	K. Endate, K. Watanabe	·	3.1 km	MPC; JPL
14450	1992 WZ_{1}	—	November 18, 1992	Kushiro	S. Ueda, H. Kaneda	EOS	8.9 km	MPC; JPL
14451	1992 WR_{5}	—	November 27, 1992	Kushiro	S. Ueda, H. Kaneda	EOS · slow	11 km	MPC; JPL
14452	1992 WB_{9}	—	November 25, 1992	Palomar	H. E. Holt	slow	4.8 km	MPC; JPL
14453	1993 FV_{7}	—	March 17, 1993	La Silla	UESAC	·	3.5 km	MPC; JPL
14454	1993 FX_{17}	—	March 17, 1993	La Silla	UESAC	(2076)	2.8 km	MPC; JPL
14455	1993 FB_{18}	—	March 17, 1993	La Silla	UESAC	·	3.6 km	MPC; JPL
14456	1993 FK_{20}	—	March 19, 1993	La Silla	UESAC	·	11 km	MPC; JPL
14457	1993 FR_{23}	—	March 21, 1993	La Silla	UESAC	·	3.4 km	MPC; JPL
14458	1993 FX_{25}	—	March 21, 1993	La Silla	UESAC	·	2.4 km	MPC; JPL
14459	1993 FY_{27}	—	March 21, 1993	La Silla	UESAC	·	2.7 km	MPC; JPL
14460	1993 FZ_{40}	—	March 19, 1993	La Silla	UESAC	·	3.4 km	MPC; JPL
14461	1993 FL_{54}	—	March 17, 1993	La Silla	UESAC	·	5.1 km	MPC; JPL
14462	1993 GA	—	April 2, 1993	Kitt Peak	Stockmaster, M., T. J. Balonek	·	2.7 km	MPC; JPL
14463 McCarter	1993 GA_{1}	McCarter	April 15, 1993	Kitt Peak	Spacewatch	V	2.3 km	MPC; JPL
14464	1993 HC_{1}	—	April 21, 1993	Siding Spring	R. H. McNaught	PHO	2.5 km	MPC; JPL
14465	1993 NB	—	July 15, 1993	Kiyosato	S. Otomo	PHO	11 km	MPC; JPL
14466 Hodge	1993 OY_{2}	Hodge	July 25, 1993	Manastash Ridge	Hammergren, M.	·	4.4 km	MPC; JPL
14467 Vranckx	1993 OP_{3}	Vranckx	July 20, 1993	La Silla	E. W. Elst	·	3.4 km	MPC; JPL
14468 Ottostern	1993 OS_{12}	Ottostern	July 19, 1993	La Silla	E. W. Elst	NYS	4.8 km	MPC; JPL
14469 Komatsuataka	1993 RK	Komatsuataka	September 12, 1993	Kitami	K. Endate, K. Watanabe	moon	4.0 km	MPC; JPL
14470	1993 RV_{7}	—	September 15, 1993	La Silla	E. W. Elst	·	4.1 km	MPC; JPL
14471	1993 SG_{1}	—	September 21, 1993	Siding Spring	R. H. McNaught	·	5.5 km	MPC; JPL
14472	1993 SQ_{14}	—	September 22, 1993	Palomar	T. B. Spahr	H	2.0 km	MPC; JPL
14473	1993 TL_{17}	—	October 9, 1993	La Silla	E. W. Elst	·	5.3 km	MPC; JPL
14474	1993 TL_{25}	—	October 9, 1993	La Silla	E. W. Elst	·	3.2 km	MPC; JPL
14475	1993 VT	—	November 14, 1993	Oizumi	T. Kobayashi	ADE	8.2 km	MPC; JPL
14476	1993 XW_{2}	—	December 14, 1993	Palomar	PCAS	EUN	6.3 km	MPC; JPL
14477	1994 CN	—	February 2, 1994	Fujieda	Shiozawa, H., T. Urata	EOS	6.9 km	MPC; JPL
14478	1994 CF_{2}	—	February 12, 1994	Oizumi	T. Kobayashi	THM	11 km	MPC; JPL
14479 Plekhanov	1994 CQ_{13}	Plekhanov	February 8, 1994	La Silla	E. W. Elst	HYG	11 km	MPC; JPL
14480	1994 PU_{1}	—	August 11, 1994	Kiyosato	S. Otomo	·	3.5 km	MPC; JPL
14481	1994 PO_{12}	—	August 10, 1994	La Silla	E. W. Elst	·	6.5 km	MPC; JPL
14482	1994 PK_{15}	—	August 10, 1994	La Silla	E. W. Elst	·	7.2 km	MPC; JPL
14483	1994 PZ_{22}	—	August 12, 1994	La Silla	E. W. Elst	·	3.6 km	MPC; JPL
14484	1994 PU_{32}	—	August 12, 1994	La Silla	E. W. Elst	·	2.6 km	MPC; JPL
14485	1994 RK_{11}	—	September 11, 1994	Kiyosato	S. Otomo	NYS	3.9 km	MPC; JPL
14486 Tuscia	1994 TE	Tuscia	October 4, 1994	San Marcello	L. Tesi, G. Cattani	·	2.0 km	MPC; JPL
14487 Sakaisakae	1994 TU_{2}	Sakaisakae	October 2, 1994	Kitami	K. Endate, K. Watanabe	·	3.0 km	MPC; JPL
14488	1994 TF_{15}	—	October 13, 1994	Kiyosato	S. Otomo	·	4.4 km	MPC; JPL
14489	1994 UW	—	October 31, 1994	Nachi-Katsuura	Y. Shimizu, T. Urata	·	2.1 km	MPC; JPL
14490	1994 US_{2}	—	October 31, 1994	Kushiro	S. Ueda, H. Kaneda	NYS	5.9 km	MPC; JPL
14491 Hitachiomiya	1994 VY_{2}	Hitachiomiya	November 4, 1994	Kitami	K. Endate, K. Watanabe	·	5.5 km	MPC; JPL
14492 Bistar	1994 VM_{6}	Bistar	November 4, 1994	Kitami	K. Endate, K. Watanabe	·	11 km	MPC; JPL
14493	1994 WP_{3}	—	November 26, 1994	Nachi-Katsuura	Y. Shimizu, T. Urata	·	3.8 km	MPC; JPL
14494	1994 YJ_{2}	—	December 30, 1994	Kushiro	S. Ueda, H. Kaneda	EUN	6.9 km	MPC; JPL
14495 Kazuakiwatanabe	1995 AK_{1}	Kazuakiwatanabe	January 6, 1995	Nyukasa	M. Hirasawa, S. Suzuki	·	10 km	MPC; JPL
14496	1995 BK_{4}	—	January 28, 1995	Kushiro	S. Ueda, H. Kaneda	·	8.5 km	MPC; JPL
14497	1995 DD	—	February 20, 1995	Oizumi	T. Kobayashi	EUN	6.9 km	MPC; JPL
14498 Bernini	1995 DO_{2}	Bernini	February 28, 1995	Colleverde	V. S. Casulli	·	6.8 km	MPC; JPL
14499 Satotoshio	1995 VR_{1}	Satotoshio	November 15, 1995	Kitami	K. Endate, K. Watanabe	·	2.5 km	MPC; JPL
14500 Kibo	1995 WO_{7}	Kibo	November 27, 1995	Oizumi	T. Kobayashi	·	2.1 km	MPC; JPL

== 14501–14600 ==
back to top

Designation			Discovery			Properties		Ref
Permanent	Provisional	Named after	Date	Site	Discoverer(s)	Category	Diam.	Ref
14501 Tetsuokojima	1995 WA_{8}	Tetsuokojima	November 29, 1995	Oizumi	T. Kobayashi	·	2.5 km	MPC; JPL
14502 Morden	1995 WB_{22}	Morden	November 17, 1995	Kitt Peak	Spacewatch	·	1.7 km	MPC; JPL
14503	1995 WW_{42}	—	November 25, 1995	Kushiro	S. Ueda, H. Kaneda	·	2.5 km	MPC; JPL
14504 Tsujimura	1995 YL_{3}	Tsujimura	December 27, 1995	Oizumi	T. Kobayashi	·	3.0 km	MPC; JPL
14505 Barentine	1996 AW_{4}	Barentine	January 12, 1996	Kitt Peak	Spacewatch	NYS	3.9 km	MPC; JPL
14506	1996 BL_{2}	—	January 26, 1996	Oizumi	T. Kobayashi	·	2.9 km	MPC; JPL
14507	1996 CQ_{1}	—	February 14, 1996	Višnjan Observatory	Višnjan	V	2.2 km	MPC; JPL
14508	1996 DH_{2}	—	February 23, 1996	Oizumi	T. Kobayashi	·	4.1 km	MPC; JPL
14509 Lučenec	1996 ER_{2}	Lučenec	March 9, 1996	Modra	A. Galád, Pravda, A.	·	3.8 km	MPC; JPL
14510	1996 ES_{2}	—	March 15, 1996	Haleakala	NEAT	(2076)	6.0 km	MPC; JPL
14511 Nickel	1996 EU_{3}	Nickel	March 11, 1996	Kitt Peak	Spacewatch	·	4.1 km	MPC; JPL
14512	1996 GL_{1}	—	April 6, 1996	Xinglong	SCAP	·	3.5 km	MPC; JPL
14513 Alicelindner	1996 GK_{17}	Alicelindner	April 15, 1996	La Silla	E. W. Elst	·	5.1 km	MPC; JPL
14514	1996 GA_{18}	—	April 15, 1996	La Silla	E. W. Elst	RAF	4.2 km	MPC; JPL
14515 Koichisato	1996 HL_{1}	Koichisato	April 21, 1996	Nanyo	T. Okuni	·	6.8 km	MPC; JPL
14516	1996 HM_{11}	—	April 17, 1996	La Silla	E. W. Elst	·	3.4 km	MPC; JPL
14517 Monitoma	1996 LJ_{1}	Monitoma	June 13, 1996	Ondřejov	P. Pravec	·	8.2 km	MPC; JPL
14518	1996 RZ_{30}	—	September 13, 1996	La Silla	Uppsala-DLR Trojan Survey	L4	17 km	MPC; JPL
14519 Ural	1996 TT_{38}	Ural	October 8, 1996	La Silla	E. W. Elst	THM	10 km	MPC; JPL
14520	1997 GC_{11}	—	April 3, 1997	Socorro	LINEAR	·	2.8 km	MPC; JPL
14521	1997 GL_{15}	—	April 3, 1997	Socorro	LINEAR	·	4.8 km	MPC; JPL
14522	1997 GS_{21}	—	April 6, 1997	Socorro	LINEAR	·	5.2 km	MPC; JPL
14523	1997 GV_{21}	—	April 6, 1997	Socorro	LINEAR	V	3.2 km	MPC; JPL
14524	1997 GK_{23}	—	April 6, 1997	Socorro	LINEAR	KOR	3.7 km	MPC; JPL
14525	1997 GV_{35}	—	April 6, 1997	Socorro	LINEAR	·	2.7 km	MPC; JPL
14526 Xenocrates	1997 JT_{3}	Xenocrates	May 6, 1997	Prescott	P. G. Comba	·	3.5 km	MPC; JPL
14527	1997 JD_{12}	—	May 3, 1997	La Silla	E. W. Elst	·	2.4 km	MPC; JPL
14528	1997 JN_{15}	—	May 3, 1997	La Silla	E. W. Elst	·	2.5 km	MPC; JPL
14529	1997 NR_{2}	—	July 6, 1997	Rand	G. R. Viscome	·	3.1 km	MPC; JPL
14530	1997 PR	—	August 1, 1997	Woomera	F. B. Zoltowski	·	6.5 km	MPC; JPL
14531	1997 PM_{2}	—	August 7, 1997	Rand	G. R. Viscome	·	8.1 km	MPC; JPL
14532	1997 QM	—	August 25, 1997	Kleť	Z. Moravec	·	4.7 km	MPC; JPL
14533 Roy	1997 QY	Roy	August 24, 1997	Bédoin	P. Antonini	·	4.5 km	MPC; JPL
14534	1997 QE_{2}	—	August 27, 1997	Nachi-Katsuura	Y. Shimizu, T. Urata	·	7.6 km	MPC; JPL
14535 Kazuyukihanda	1997 RF	Kazuyukihanda	September 1, 1997	Yatsuka	H. Abe	·	18 km	MPC; JPL
14536	1997 RY_{2}	—	September 3, 1997	Woomera	F. B. Zoltowski	AGN	3.5 km	MPC; JPL
14537 Týn nad Vltavou	1997 RL_{7}	Týn nad Vltavou	September 10, 1997	Kleť	M. Tichý, Z. Moravec	EUN	3.4 km	MPC; JPL
14538	1997 RR_{8}	—	September 12, 1997	Xinglong	SCAP	EOS	6.1 km	MPC; JPL
14539 Clocke Roeland	1997 RU_{9}	Clocke Roeland	September 10, 1997	Uccle	T. Pauwels	·	3.5 km	MPC; JPL
14540	1997 RJ_{10}	—	September 13, 1997	Xinglong	SCAP	·	6.3 km	MPC; JPL
14541 Sacrobosco	1997 SF	Sacrobosco	September 20, 1997	Kleť	J. Tichá, M. Tichý	HYG	7.4 km	MPC; JPL
14542 Karitskaya	1997 SW_{9}	Karitskaya	September 29, 1997	Goodricke-Pigott	R. A. Tucker	EOS	6.0 km	MPC; JPL
14543 Sajigawasuiseki	1997 SF_{11}	Sajigawasuiseki	September 28, 1997	Saji	Saji	·	7.0 km	MPC; JPL
14544 Ericjones	1997 SG_{21}	Ericjones	September 29, 1997	Kitt Peak	Spacewatch	EOS	9.8 km	MPC; JPL
14545	1997 SK_{25}	—	September 29, 1997	Nachi-Katsuura	Y. Shimizu, T. Urata	EOS	5.6 km	MPC; JPL
14546	1997 TM_{18}	—	October 3, 1997	Xinglong	SCAP	·	5.3 km	MPC; JPL
14547	1997 TF_{19}	—	October 8, 1997	Gekko	T. Kagawa, T. Urata	THM	7.4 km	MPC; JPL
14548	1997 TJ_{24}	—	October 5, 1997	Xinglong	SCAP	EOS	8.0 km	MPC; JPL
14549	1997 TM_{27}	—	October 8, 1997	Kiyosato	S. Otomo	·	5.2 km	MPC; JPL
14550 Lehký	1997 UU_{7}	Lehký	October 27, 1997	Ondřejov	L. Kotková	·	3.4 km	MPC; JPL
14551 Itagaki	1997 UN_{8}	Itagaki	October 22, 1997	Nanyo	T. Okuni	·	10 km	MPC; JPL
14552	1997 UX_{20}	—	October 24, 1997	Xinglong	SCAP	THM	8.8 km	MPC; JPL
14553	1997 UD_{25}	—	October 27, 1997	Kiyosato	S. Otomo	KOR	7.3 km	MPC; JPL
14554	1997 UE_{25}	—	October 27, 1997	Kiyosato	S. Otomo	·	11 km	MPC; JPL
14555 Shinohara	1997 VQ	Shinohara	November 1, 1997	Kitami	K. Endate, K. Watanabe	EOS	9.2 km	MPC; JPL
14556	1997 VN_{1}	—	November 1, 1997	Kushiro	S. Ueda, H. Kaneda	THM	10 km	MPC; JPL
14557	1997 VG_{8}	—	November 15, 1997	Woomera	F. B. Zoltowski	·	9.7 km	MPC; JPL
14558 Wangganchang	1997 WG_{1}	Wangganchang	November 19, 1997	Xinglong	SCAP	EOS ·	8.2 km	MPC; JPL
14559	1997 WP_{28}	—	November 29, 1997	Ondřejov	P. Pravec	EOS	7.3 km	MPC; JPL
14560	1997 WB_{33}	—	November 29, 1997	Socorro	LINEAR	CYB	10 km	MPC; JPL
14561	1997 WC_{34}	—	November 29, 1997	Socorro	LINEAR	THM	9.3 km	MPC; JPL
14562	1997 YQ_{19}	—	December 27, 1997	Xinglong	SCAP	·	9.3 km	MPC; JPL
14563	1998 AV_{5}	—	January 8, 1998	Caussols	ODAS	·	3.1 km	MPC; JPL
14564 Heasley	1998 BX_{13}	Heasley	January 26, 1998	Kitt Peak	Spacewatch	·	12 km	MPC; JPL
14565	1998 EQ_{10}	—	March 1, 1998	La Silla	E. W. Elst	·	3.4 km	MPC; JPL
14566 Hōkūleʻa	1998 MY_{7}	Hōkūleʻa	June 19, 1998	Anderson Mesa	LONEOS	·	11 km	MPC; JPL
14567 Nicovincenti	1998 MQ_{8}	Nicovincenti	June 19, 1998	Socorro	LINEAR	·	3.4 km	MPC; JPL
14568 Zanotta	1998 OK	Zanotta	July 19, 1998	San Marcello	A. Boattini, M. Tombelli	V	2.9 km	MPC; JPL
14569	1998 QB_{32}	—	August 17, 1998	Socorro	LINEAR	T_{j} (2.95) · 3:2	18 km	MPC; JPL
14570 Burkam	1998 QS_{37}	Burkam	August 17, 1998	Socorro	LINEAR	·	2.1 km	MPC; JPL
14571 Caralexander	1998 QC_{45}	Caralexander	August 17, 1998	Socorro	LINEAR	·	5.3 km	MPC; JPL
14572 Armando	1998 QX_{54}	Armando	August 27, 1998	Anderson Mesa	LONEOS	·	3.3 km	MPC; JPL
14573 Montebugnoli	1998 QD_{55}	Montebugnoli	August 27, 1998	Anderson Mesa	LONEOS	·	2.3 km	MPC; JPL
14574 Payette	1998 QR_{58}	Payette	August 30, 1998	Kitt Peak	Spacewatch	·	2.0 km	MPC; JPL
14575 Jamesblanc	1998 QC_{92}	Jamesblanc	August 28, 1998	Socorro	LINEAR	·	3.2 km	MPC; JPL
14576 Jefholley	1998 QO_{92}	Jefholley	August 28, 1998	Socorro	LINEAR	·	3.3 km	MPC; JPL
14577	1998 QN_{93}	—	August 28, 1998	Socorro	LINEAR	·	5.8 km	MPC; JPL
14578	1998 QO_{93}	—	August 28, 1998	Socorro	LINEAR	EUN	5.0 km	MPC; JPL
14579	1998 QZ_{99}	—	August 26, 1998	La Silla	E. W. Elst	·	3.8 km	MPC; JPL
14580	1998 QW_{101}	—	August 26, 1998	La Silla	E. W. Elst	·	3.7 km	MPC; JPL
14581	1998 RT_{4}	—	September 14, 1998	Socorro	LINEAR	·	6.9 km	MPC; JPL
14582 Conlin	1998 RK_{49}	Conlin	September 14, 1998	Socorro	LINEAR	·	3.9 km	MPC; JPL
14583 Lester	1998 RN_{61}	Lester	September 14, 1998	Socorro	LINEAR	·	3.8 km	MPC; JPL
14584 Lawson	1998 RH_{63}	Lawson	September 14, 1998	Socorro	LINEAR	·	3.1 km	MPC; JPL
14585	1998 RX_{64}	—	September 14, 1998	Socorro	LINEAR	NYS	4.1 km	MPC; JPL
14586	1998 RN_{70}	—	September 14, 1998	Socorro	LINEAR	·	5.2 km	MPC; JPL
14587	1998 RW_{70}	—	September 14, 1998	Socorro	LINEAR	·	2.5 km	MPC; JPL
14588 Pharrams	1998 RH_{73}	Pharrams	September 14, 1998	Socorro	LINEAR	V	2.9 km	MPC; JPL
14589 Stevenbyrnes	1998 RW_{79}	Stevenbyrnes	September 14, 1998	Socorro	LINEAR	·	3.0 km	MPC; JPL
14590	1998 RL_{80}	—	September 14, 1998	Socorro	LINEAR	·	3.1 km	MPC; JPL
14591	1998 SZ_{21}	—	September 23, 1998	Višnjan Observatory	Višnjan	·	2.7 km	MPC; JPL
14592	1998 SV_{22}	—	September 20, 1998	Woomera	F. B. Zoltowski	V	2.5 km	MPC; JPL
14593 Everett	1998 SA_{26}	Everett	September 22, 1998	Anderson Mesa	LONEOS	·	1.6 km	MPC; JPL
14594 Jindrašilhán	1998 SS_{26}	Jindrašilhán	September 24, 1998	Ondřejov	P. Pravec	EUN	3.8 km	MPC; JPL
14595 Peaker	1998 SW_{32}	Peaker	September 23, 1998	Kitt Peak	Spacewatch	(5)	3.7 km	MPC; JPL
14596 Bergstralh	1998 SC_{55}	Bergstralh	September 16, 1998	Anderson Mesa	LONEOS	·	4.7 km	MPC; JPL
14597 Waynerichie	1998 SV_{57}	Waynerichie	September 17, 1998	Anderson Mesa	LONEOS	·	2.4 km	MPC; JPL
14598 Larrysmith	1998 SU_{60}	Larrysmith	September 17, 1998	Anderson Mesa	LONEOS	·	1.9 km	MPC; JPL
14599	1998 SV_{64}	—	September 20, 1998	La Silla	E. W. Elst	·	2.8 km	MPC; JPL
14600 Gainsbourg	1998 SG_{73}	Gainsbourg	September 21, 1998	La Silla	E. W. Elst	·	3.0 km	MPC; JPL

== 14601–14700 ==
back to top

Designation			Discovery			Properties		Ref
Permanent	Provisional	Named after	Date	Site	Discoverer(s)	Category	Diam.	Ref
14601	1998 SU_{73}	—	September 21, 1998	La Silla	E. W. Elst	·	6.4 km	MPC; JPL
14602	1998 SW_{74}	—	September 21, 1998	La Silla	E. W. Elst	·	2.4 km	MPC; JPL
14603	1998 SK_{115}	—	September 26, 1998	Socorro	LINEAR	EUN	4.7 km	MPC; JPL
14604	1998 SM_{115}	—	September 26, 1998	Socorro	LINEAR	·	8.2 km	MPC; JPL
14605 Hyeyeonchoi	1998 SD_{123}	Hyeyeonchoi	September 26, 1998	Socorro	LINEAR	·	3.9 km	MPC; JPL
14606 Hifleischer	1998 SK_{125}	Hifleischer	September 26, 1998	Socorro	LINEAR	V	2.3 km	MPC; JPL
14607	1998 SG_{132}	—	September 26, 1998	Socorro	LINEAR	(883)	3.3 km	MPC; JPL
14608	1998 SN_{135}	—	September 26, 1998	Socorro	LINEAR	·	4.0 km	MPC; JPL
14609	1998 SW_{145}	—	September 20, 1998	La Silla	E. W. Elst	·	4.5 km	MPC; JPL
14610	1998 SE_{146}	—	September 20, 1998	La Silla	E. W. Elst	DOR	9.1 km	MPC; JPL
14611 Elsaadawi	1998 SA_{148}	Elsaadawi	September 20, 1998	La Silla	E. W. Elst	(5)	3.3 km	MPC; JPL
14612 Irtish	1998 SG_{164}	Irtish	September 18, 1998	La Silla	E. W. Elst	(1298)	16 km	MPC; JPL
14613 Sanchez	1998 TP_{2}	Sanchez	October 13, 1998	Caussols	ODAS	·	5.6 km	MPC; JPL
14614	1998 TX_{2}	—	October 13, 1998	Caussols	ODAS	·	7.6 km	MPC; JPL
14615	1998 TR_{5}	—	October 13, 1998	Višnjan Observatory	K. Korlević	·	3.8 km	MPC; JPL
14616 Van Gaal	1998 TK_{30}	Van Gaal	October 10, 1998	Anderson Mesa	LONEOS	·	6.3 km	MPC; JPL
14617 Lasvergnas	1998 UA_{4}	Lasvergnas	October 21, 1998	Caussols	ODAS	·	6.7 km	MPC; JPL
14618	1998 UK_{7}	—	October 22, 1998	Višnjan Observatory	K. Korlević	MAR	6.2 km	MPC; JPL
14619 Plotkin	1998 UF_{9}	Plotkin	October 16, 1998	Kitt Peak	Spacewatch	·	1.8 km	MPC; JPL
14620	1998 UP_{15}	—	October 23, 1998	Višnjan Observatory	K. Korlević	·	5.5 km	MPC; JPL
14621 Tati	1998 UF_{18}	Tati	October 22, 1998	Reedy Creek	J. Broughton	·	2.9 km	MPC; JPL
14622 Arcadiopoveda	1998 UN_{18}	Arcadiopoveda	October 28, 1998	Catalina	CSS	·	13 km	MPC; JPL
14623 Kamoun	1998 UE_{24}	Kamoun	October 17, 1998	Anderson Mesa	LONEOS	·	5.5 km	MPC; JPL
14624 Prymachenko	1998 UO_{24}	Prymachenko	October 18, 1998	Anderson Mesa	LONEOS	·	5.6 km	MPC; JPL
14625	1998 UH_{31}	—	October 18, 1998	Xinglong	SCAP	EUN	10 km	MPC; JPL
14626	1998 UP_{39}	—	October 28, 1998	Socorro	LINEAR	·	7.7 km	MPC; JPL
14627 Emilkowalski	1998 VA	Emilkowalski	November 7, 1998	Quail Hollow Observatory	R. A. Kowalski	(194)	7.1 km	MPC; JPL
14628	1998 VX_{18}	—	November 10, 1998	Socorro	LINEAR	·	3.4 km	MPC; JPL
14629	1998 VT_{30}	—	November 10, 1998	Socorro	LINEAR	·	3.0 km	MPC; JPL
14630	1998 VQ_{31}	—	November 10, 1998	Socorro	LINEAR	EUN	6.6 km	MPC; JPL
14631 Benbryan	1998 VS_{32}	Benbryan	November 15, 1998	Catalina	CSS	·	17 km	MPC; JPL
14632 Flensburg	1998 VY_{33}	Flensburg	November 11, 1998	Bornheim	Ehring, N.	·	6.8 km	MPC; JPL
14633	1998 VY_{34}	—	November 12, 1998	Kushiro	S. Ueda, H. Kaneda	·	2.5 km	MPC; JPL
14634	1998 VE_{37}	—	November 10, 1998	Socorro	LINEAR	·	10 km	MPC; JPL
14635	1998 VO_{38}	—	November 10, 1998	Socorro	LINEAR	·	5.3 km	MPC; JPL
14636	1998 VD_{44}	—	November 15, 1998	Višnjan Observatory	K. Korlević	·	4.7 km	MPC; JPL
14637	1998 WN_{1}	—	November 18, 1998	Oizumi	T. Kobayashi	·	3.1 km	MPC; JPL
14638	1998 WQ_{1}	—	November 18, 1998	Oizumi	T. Kobayashi	THM	8.2 km	MPC; JPL
14639	1998 WK_{3}	—	November 19, 1998	Oizumi	T. Kobayashi	·	6.7 km	MPC; JPL
14640	1998 WF_{4}	—	November 18, 1998	Kushiro	S. Ueda, H. Kaneda	·	7.8 km	MPC; JPL
14641	1998 WC_{6}	—	November 18, 1998	Kushiro	S. Ueda, H. Kaneda	·	2.8 km	MPC; JPL
14642	1998 WF_{24}	—	November 25, 1998	Uenohara	N. Kawasato	·	5.8 km	MPC; JPL
14643 Morata	1998 WZ_{30}	Morata	November 24, 1998	Observatoire de Blauvac	R. Roy	·	4.6 km	MPC; JPL
14644	1998 XR_{3}	—	December 9, 1998	Oizumi	T. Kobayashi	·	6.7 km	MPC; JPL
14645	1998 XR_{9}	—	December 14, 1998	Višnjan Observatory	K. Korlević	V	3.3 km	MPC; JPL
14646	1998 XO_{28}	—	December 14, 1998	Socorro	LINEAR	·	5.6 km	MPC; JPL
14647	1998 XG_{48}	—	December 14, 1998	Socorro	LINEAR	EOS	9.8 km	MPC; JPL
14648	1998 XV_{49}	—	December 14, 1998	Socorro	LINEAR	·	13 km	MPC; JPL
14649	1998 XW_{62}	—	December 12, 1998	Socorro	LINEAR	·	13 km	MPC; JPL
14650	1998 YD_{3}	—	December 17, 1998	Oizumi	T. Kobayashi	·	3.5 km	MPC; JPL
14651	1998 YE_{5}	—	December 18, 1998	Caussols	ODAS	·	13 km	MPC; JPL
14652	1998 YT_{8}	—	December 17, 1998	Xinglong	SCAP	KOR	5.6 km	MPC; JPL
14653	1998 YV_{11}	—	December 26, 1998	Oizumi	T. Kobayashi	·	3.1 km	MPC; JPL
14654 Rajivgupta	1998 YV_{16}	Rajivgupta	December 22, 1998	Kitt Peak	Spacewatch	THM	11 km	MPC; JPL
14655	1998 YJ_{22}	—	December 21, 1998	Xinglong	SCAP	PAD	9.4 km	MPC; JPL
14656 Lijiang	1998 YN_{22}	Lijiang	December 29, 1998	Xinglong	SCAP	·	8.1 km	MPC; JPL
14657	1998 YU_{27}	—	December 26, 1998	Višnjan Observatory	K. Korlević	·	5.8 km	MPC; JPL
14658	1999 AC_{10}	—	January 13, 1999	Višnjan Observatory	K. Korlević	EOS	10 km	MPC; JPL
14659 Gregoriana	1999 AF_{24}	Gregoriana	January 15, 1999	Montelupo	M. Tombelli, G. Forti	·	7.2 km	MPC; JPL
14660	1999 BO_{1}	—	January 16, 1999	Višnjan Observatory	K. Korlević	RAF	6.3 km	MPC; JPL
14661	1999 BH_{10}	—	January 23, 1999	Višnjan Observatory	K. Korlević	·	4.0 km	MPC; JPL
14662	1999 BF_{12}	—	January 22, 1999	Oizumi	T. Kobayashi	EUN	5.2 km	MPC; JPL
14663	1999 BP_{25}	—	January 18, 1999	Socorro	LINEAR	·	5.2 km	MPC; JPL
14664 Vandervelden	1999 BY_{25}	Vandervelden	January 25, 1999	Oohira	T. Urata	·	14 km	MPC; JPL
14665	1999 CC_{5}	—	February 12, 1999	Oohira	T. Urata	EUN	7.9 km	MPC; JPL
14666	1999 CG_{17}	—	February 10, 1999	Socorro	LINEAR	EOS	9.3 km	MPC; JPL
14667	1999 CS_{19}	—	February 10, 1999	Socorro	LINEAR	EOS	8.8 km	MPC; JPL
14668	1999 CB_{67}	—	February 12, 1999	Socorro	LINEAR	EUN	8.2 km	MPC; JPL
14669 Beletic	1999 DC	Beletic	February 16, 1999	Caussols	ODAS	3:2	16 km	MPC; JPL
14670	1999 JG_{53}	—	May 10, 1999	Socorro	LINEAR	(5)	4.6 km	MPC; JPL
14671	1999 RM_{49}	—	September 7, 1999	Socorro	LINEAR	·	9.1 km	MPC; JPL
14672	1999 RO_{94}	—	September 7, 1999	Socorro	LINEAR	EOS	10 km	MPC; JPL
14673	1999 RK_{169}	—	September 9, 1999	Socorro	LINEAR	·	8.9 km	MPC; JPL
14674 INAOE	1999 UD_{5}	INAOE	October 29, 1999	Catalina	CSS	·	4.1 km	MPC; JPL
14675	1999 VS_{7}	—	November 7, 1999	Višnjan Observatory	K. Korlević	·	4.4 km	MPC; JPL
14676	1999 WW_{7}	—	November 29, 1999	Višnjan Observatory	K. Korlević	·	3.5 km	MPC; JPL
14677	1999 XZ	—	December 2, 1999	Oizumi	T. Kobayashi	·	5.5 km	MPC; JPL
14678 Pinney	1999 XN_{33}	Pinney	December 6, 1999	Socorro	LINEAR	NYS	3.5 km	MPC; JPL
14679 Susanreed	1999 XN_{42}	Susanreed	December 7, 1999	Socorro	LINEAR	NYS	4.0 km	MPC; JPL
14680	1999 XV_{104}	—	December 10, 1999	Oizumi	T. Kobayashi	RAF	4.2 km	MPC; JPL
14681 Estellechurch	1999 XW_{108}	Estellechurch	December 4, 1999	Catalina	CSS	THM	7.8 km	MPC; JPL
14682 Davidhirsch	1999 XY_{110}	Davidhirsch	December 5, 1999	Catalina	CSS	·	4.4 km	MPC; JPL
14683 Remy	1999 XG_{156}	Remy	December 8, 1999	Socorro	LINEAR	(2076)	3.1 km	MPC; JPL
14684 Reyes	1999 XQ_{167}	Reyes	December 10, 1999	Socorro	LINEAR	·	3.9 km	MPC; JPL
14685	1999 XM_{172}	—	December 10, 1999	Socorro	LINEAR	EOS	8.4 km	MPC; JPL
14686	1999 XA_{174}	—	December 10, 1999	Socorro	LINEAR	·	4.6 km	MPC; JPL
14687	1999 YR_{13}	—	December 30, 1999	Višnjan Observatory	K. Korlević, M. Jurić	·	4.4 km	MPC; JPL
14688	2000 AJ_{2}	—	January 3, 2000	Oizumi	T. Kobayashi	PHO	4.8 km	MPC; JPL
14689	2000 AM_{2}	—	January 3, 2000	Oizumi	T. Kobayashi	·	5.4 km	MPC; JPL
14690	2000 AR_{25}	—	January 3, 2000	Socorro	LINEAR	L4	43 km	MPC; JPL
14691	2000 AK_{119}	—	January 5, 2000	Socorro	LINEAR	EUN	13 km	MPC; JPL
14692	2000 AG_{133}	—	January 3, 2000	Socorro	LINEAR	EOS	12 km	MPC; JPL
14693 Selwyn	2000 AH_{144}	Selwyn	January 5, 2000	Socorro	LINEAR	·	4.3 km	MPC; JPL
14694 Skurat	2000 AR_{145}	Skurat	January 6, 2000	Socorro	LINEAR	BAP	2.9 km	MPC; JPL
14695	2000 AR_{200}	—	January 9, 2000	Socorro	LINEAR	EUN	6.6 km	MPC; JPL
14696 Lindawilliams	2000 AW_{203}	Lindawilliams	January 10, 2000	Socorro	LINEAR	·	6.1 km	MPC; JPL
14697 Ronsawyer	2000 AO_{214}	Ronsawyer	January 6, 2000	Kitt Peak	Spacewatch	·	2.3 km	MPC; JPL
14698 Scottyoung	2000 AT_{230}	Scottyoung	January 3, 2000	Kitt Peak	Spacewatch	MAS	2.5 km	MPC; JPL
14699 Klarasmi	2000 AV_{239}	Klarasmi	January 6, 2000	Anderson Mesa	LONEOS	·	16 km	MPC; JPL
14700 Johnreid	2000 AC_{240}	Johnreid	January 6, 2000	Anderson Mesa	LONEOS	·	6.2 km	MPC; JPL

== 14701–14800 ==
back to top

Designation			Discovery			Properties		Ref
Permanent	Provisional	Named after	Date	Site	Discoverer(s)	Category	Diam.	Ref
14701 Aizu	2000 AO_{240}	Aizu	January 7, 2000	Anderson Mesa	LONEOS	·	6.0 km	MPC; JPL
14702 Benclark	2000 AY_{242}	Benclark	January 7, 2000	Anderson Mesa	LONEOS	EOS	9.0 km	MPC; JPL
14703	2000 AX_{243}	—	January 7, 2000	Socorro	LINEAR	·	4.7 km	MPC; JPL
14704	2000 CE_{2}	—	February 2, 2000	Oizumi	T. Kobayashi	·	7.6 km	MPC; JPL
14705	2000 CG_{2}	—	February 2, 2000	Oizumi	T. Kobayashi	·	15 km	MPC; JPL
14706	2000 CQ_{2}	—	February 4, 2000	Oizumi	T. Kobayashi	EUN	7.1 km	MPC; JPL
14707	2000 CC_{20}	—	February 2, 2000	Socorro	LINEAR	L4	26 km	MPC; JPL
14708 Slaven	2000 CU_{26}	Slaven	February 2, 2000	Socorro	LINEAR	·	2.2 km	MPC; JPL
14709	2000 CO_{29}	—	February 2, 2000	Socorro	LINEAR	·	10 km	MPC; JPL
14710	2000 CC_{33}	—	February 2, 2000	Socorro	LINEAR	·	1.4 km	MPC; JPL
14711	2000 CG_{36}	—	February 2, 2000	Socorro	LINEAR	·	4.2 km	MPC; JPL
14712	2000 CO_{51}	—	February 2, 2000	Socorro	LINEAR	EOS	9.2 km	MPC; JPL
14713	2000 CS_{63}	—	February 2, 2000	Socorro	LINEAR	·	6.7 km	MPC; JPL
14714	2000 CQ_{65}	—	February 4, 2000	Socorro	LINEAR	NYS	5.5 km	MPC; JPL
14715	2000 CD_{71}	—	February 7, 2000	Socorro	LINEAR	VER	13 km	MPC; JPL
14716	2000 CX_{81}	—	February 4, 2000	Socorro	LINEAR	THM	13 km	MPC; JPL
14717	2000 CJ_{82}	—	February 4, 2000	Socorro	LINEAR	·	20 km	MPC; JPL
14718	2000 CX_{83}	—	February 4, 2000	Socorro	LINEAR	NYS	4.6 km	MPC; JPL
14719 Sobey	2000 CB_{85}	Sobey	February 4, 2000	Socorro	LINEAR	·	3.2 km	MPC; JPL
14720	2000 CQ_{85}	—	February 4, 2000	Socorro	LINEAR	EUN	8.5 km	MPC; JPL
14721	2000 CW_{91}	—	February 6, 2000	Socorro	LINEAR	EUN	5.1 km	MPC; JPL
14722	2000 CK_{92}	—	February 6, 2000	Socorro	LINEAR	VER	13 km	MPC; JPL
14723	2000 CB_{93}	—	February 6, 2000	Socorro	LINEAR	·	13 km	MPC; JPL
14724 SNO	2000 CA_{100}	SNO	February 10, 2000	Kitt Peak	Spacewatch	KOR	3.9 km	MPC; JPL
14725	2000 DC_{3}	—	February 27, 2000	Oizumi	T. Kobayashi	slow	11 km	MPC; JPL
14726	2000 DD_{3}	—	February 27, 2000	Oizumi	T. Kobayashi	·	19 km	MPC; JPL
14727 Suggs	2000 DU_{11}	Suggs	February 27, 2000	Kitt Peak	Spacewatch	·	1.8 km	MPC; JPL
14728 Schuchardt	2000 DY_{14}	Schuchardt	February 26, 2000	Catalina	CSS	·	4.1 km	MPC; JPL
14729	2000 DK_{16}	—	February 29, 2000	Višnjan Observatory	K. Korlević	·	4.4 km	MPC; JPL
14730	2000 DS_{19}	—	February 29, 2000	Socorro	LINEAR	·	8.1 km	MPC; JPL
14731	2000 DY_{68}	—	February 29, 2000	Socorro	LINEAR	·	8.4 km	MPC; JPL
14732	2000 DX_{71}	—	February 29, 2000	Socorro	LINEAR	THM ·	9.0 km	MPC; JPL
14733	2000 DV_{74}	—	February 29, 2000	Socorro	LINEAR	·	5.8 km	MPC; JPL
14734 Susanstoker	2000 DZ_{78}	Susanstoker	February 29, 2000	Socorro	LINEAR	·	2.6 km	MPC; JPL
14735	2000 DV_{86}	—	February 29, 2000	Socorro	LINEAR	·	3.8 km	MPC; JPL
14736	2000 DW_{97}	—	February 29, 2000	Socorro	LINEAR	EMA	14 km	MPC; JPL
14737	2000 DU_{99}	—	February 29, 2000	Socorro	LINEAR	EUN	4.1 km	MPC; JPL
14738	2000 DW_{106}	—	February 29, 2000	Socorro	LINEAR	·	9.5 km	MPC; JPL
14739 Edgarchavez	2000 EF_{21}	Edgarchavez	March 3, 2000	Catalina	CSS	EOS	10 km	MPC; JPL
14740	2000 ED_{32}	—	March 5, 2000	Socorro	LINEAR	·	12 km	MPC; JPL
14741 Teamequinox	2000 EQ_{49}	Teamequinox	March 9, 2000	Socorro	LINEAR	·	2.6 km	MPC; JPL
14742	2000 EQ_{56}	—	March 8, 2000	Socorro	LINEAR	·	9.8 km	MPC; JPL
14743	2016 P-L	—	September 24, 1960	Palomar	C. J. van Houten, I. van Houten-Groeneveld, T. Gehrels	·	8.1 km	MPC; JPL
14744	2092 P-L	—	September 26, 1960	Palomar	C. J. van Houten, I. van Houten-Groeneveld, T. Gehrels	·	5.9 km	MPC; JPL
14745	2154 P-L	—	September 24, 1960	Palomar	C. J. van Houten, I. van Houten-Groeneveld, T. Gehrels	·	4.2 km	MPC; JPL
14746	2164 P-L	—	September 26, 1960	Palomar	C. J. van Houten, I. van Houten-Groeneveld, T. Gehrels	(6769)	6.2 km	MPC; JPL
14747	2541 P-L	—	September 24, 1960	Palomar	C. J. van Houten, I. van Houten-Groeneveld, T. Gehrels	·	2.5 km	MPC; JPL
14748	2620 P-L	—	September 24, 1960	Palomar	C. J. van Houten, I. van Houten-Groeneveld, T. Gehrels	·	7.2 km	MPC; JPL
14749	2626 P-L	—	September 26, 1960	Palomar	C. J. van Houten, I. van Houten-Groeneveld, T. Gehrels	·	9.3 km	MPC; JPL
14750	2654 P-L	—	September 24, 1960	Palomar	C. J. van Houten, I. van Houten-Groeneveld, T. Gehrels	·	5.2 km	MPC; JPL
14751	2688 P-L	—	September 24, 1960	Palomar	C. J. van Houten, I. van Houten-Groeneveld, T. Gehrels	·	4.1 km	MPC; JPL
14752	3005 P-L	—	September 24, 1960	Palomar	C. J. van Houten, I. van Houten-Groeneveld, T. Gehrels	EOS	6.5 km	MPC; JPL
14753	4592 P-L	—	September 24, 1960	Palomar	C. J. van Houten, I. van Houten-Groeneveld, T. Gehrels	·	3.5 km	MPC; JPL
14754	4806 P-L	—	September 24, 1960	Palomar	C. J. van Houten, I. van Houten-Groeneveld, T. Gehrels	·	3.5 km	MPC; JPL
14755	6069 P-L	—	September 24, 1960	Palomar	C. J. van Houten, I. van Houten-Groeneveld, T. Gehrels	·	4.9 km	MPC; JPL
14756	6232 P-L	—	September 24, 1960	Palomar	C. J. van Houten, I. van Houten-Groeneveld, T. Gehrels	·	6.1 km	MPC; JPL
14757	6309 P-L	—	September 24, 1960	Palomar	C. J. van Houten, I. van Houten-Groeneveld, T. Gehrels	·	3.4 km	MPC; JPL
14758	6519 P-L	—	September 24, 1960	Palomar	C. J. van Houten, I. van Houten-Groeneveld, T. Gehrels	·	11 km	MPC; JPL
14759	6520 P-L	—	September 24, 1960	Palomar	C. J. van Houten, I. van Houten-Groeneveld, T. Gehrels	(1338) (FLO)	2.4 km	MPC; JPL
14760	6595 P-L	—	September 24, 1960	Palomar	C. J. van Houten, I. van Houten-Groeneveld, T. Gehrels	MAS	3.2 km	MPC; JPL
14761	6608 P-L	—	September 24, 1960	Palomar	C. J. van Houten, I. van Houten-Groeneveld, T. Gehrels	·	2.5 km	MPC; JPL
14762	6647 P-L	—	September 26, 1960	Palomar	C. J. van Houten, I. van Houten-Groeneveld, T. Gehrels	NYS	3.3 km	MPC; JPL
14763	6793 P-L	—	September 24, 1960	Palomar	C. J. van Houten, I. van Houten-Groeneveld, T. Gehrels	·	2.2 km	MPC; JPL
14764 Kilauea	7072 P-L	Kilauea	October 17, 1960	Palomar	C. J. van Houten, I. van Houten-Groeneveld, T. Gehrels	H	2.3 km	MPC; JPL
14765	9519 P-L	—	October 17, 1960	Palomar	C. J. van Houten, I. van Houten-Groeneveld, T. Gehrels	HOF	7.4 km	MPC; JPL
14766	9594 P-L	—	October 17, 1960	Palomar	C. J. van Houten, I. van Houten-Groeneveld, T. Gehrels	CYB	9.9 km	MPC; JPL
14767	1137 T-1	—	March 25, 1971	Palomar	C. J. van Houten, I. van Houten-Groeneveld, T. Gehrels	·	3.5 km	MPC; JPL
14768	1238 T-1	—	March 25, 1971	Palomar	C. J. van Houten, I. van Houten-Groeneveld, T. Gehrels	KOR	4.1 km	MPC; JPL
14769	2175 T-1	—	March 25, 1971	Palomar	C. J. van Houten, I. van Houten-Groeneveld, T. Gehrels	·	3.3 km	MPC; JPL
14770	2198 T-1	—	March 25, 1971	Palomar	C. J. van Houten, I. van Houten-Groeneveld, T. Gehrels	THM	6.9 km	MPC; JPL
14771	4105 T-1	—	March 26, 1971	Palomar	C. J. van Houten, I. van Houten-Groeneveld, T. Gehrels	THM	11 km	MPC; JPL
14772	4195 T-1	—	March 26, 1971	Palomar	C. J. van Houten, I. van Houten-Groeneveld, T. Gehrels	KOR	4.6 km	MPC; JPL
14773	4264 T-1	—	March 26, 1971	Palomar	C. J. van Houten, I. van Houten-Groeneveld, T. Gehrels	·	8.1 km	MPC; JPL
14774	4845 T-1	—	May 13, 1971	Palomar	C. J. van Houten, I. van Houten-Groeneveld, T. Gehrels	slow	9.1 km	MPC; JPL
14775	1139 T-2	—	September 29, 1973	Palomar	C. J. van Houten, I. van Houten-Groeneveld, T. Gehrels	·	6.1 km	MPC; JPL
14776	1282 T-2	—	September 29, 1973	Palomar	C. J. van Houten, I. van Houten-Groeneveld, T. Gehrels	KOR	5.0 km	MPC; JPL
14777	2078 T-2	—	September 29, 1973	Palomar	C. J. van Houten, I. van Houten-Groeneveld, T. Gehrels	·	2.5 km	MPC; JPL
14778	2216 T-2	—	September 29, 1973	Palomar	C. J. van Houten, I. van Houten-Groeneveld, T. Gehrels	(3460)	9.6 km	MPC; JPL
14779	3072 T-2	—	September 30, 1973	Palomar	C. J. van Houten, I. van Houten-Groeneveld, T. Gehrels	KOR	6.8 km	MPC; JPL
14780	1078 T-3	—	October 17, 1977	Palomar	C. J. van Houten, I. van Houten-Groeneveld, T. Gehrels	MAR	4.7 km	MPC; JPL
14781	1107 T-3	—	October 17, 1977	Palomar	C. J. van Houten, I. van Houten-Groeneveld, T. Gehrels	·	7.5 km	MPC; JPL
14782	3149 T-3	—	October 16, 1977	Palomar	C. J. van Houten, I. van Houten-Groeneveld, T. Gehrels	NYS	1.7 km	MPC; JPL
14783	3152 T-3	—	October 16, 1977	Palomar	C. J. van Houten, I. van Houten-Groeneveld, T. Gehrels	KOR	4.9 km	MPC; JPL
14784	3268 T-3	—	October 16, 1977	Palomar	C. J. van Houten, I. van Houten-Groeneveld, T. Gehrels	·	1.9 km	MPC; JPL
14785	3508 T-3	—	October 16, 1977	Palomar	C. J. van Houten, I. van Houten-Groeneveld, T. Gehrels	·	4.2 km	MPC; JPL
14786	4052 T-3	—	October 16, 1977	Palomar	C. J. van Houten, I. van Houten-Groeneveld, T. Gehrels	V	2.3 km	MPC; JPL
14787	5038 T-3	—	October 16, 1977	Palomar	C. J. van Houten, I. van Houten-Groeneveld, T. Gehrels	EOS	7.7 km	MPC; JPL
14788	5172 T-3	—	October 16, 1977	Palomar	C. J. van Houten, I. van Houten-Groeneveld, T. Gehrels	EOS	8.2 km	MPC; JPL
14789 GAISH	1969 TY_{1}	GAISH	October 8, 1969	Nauchnij	L. I. Chernykh	·	15 km	MPC; JPL
14790 Beletskij	1970 OF	Beletskij	July 30, 1970	Nauchnij	T. M. Smirnova	·	10 km	MPC; JPL
14791 Atreus	1973 SU	Atreus	September 19, 1973	Palomar	C. J. van Houten, I. van Houten-Groeneveld, T. Gehrels	L4	22 km	MPC; JPL
14792 Thyestes	1973 SG_{1}	Thyestes	September 24, 1973	Palomar	C. J. van Houten, I. van Houten-Groeneveld, T. Gehrels	L4	19 km	MPC; JPL
14793 Gardner-Vandy	1975 SE_{2}	Gardner-Vandy	September 30, 1975	Palomar	S. J. Bus	V	2.0 km	MPC; JPL
14794 Konetskiy	1976 SD_{5}	Konetskiy	September 24, 1976	Nauchnij	N. S. Chernykh	EOS	7.7 km	MPC; JPL
14795 Syoyou	1977 EE_{7}	Syoyou	March 12, 1977	Kiso	H. Kosai, K. Furukawa	·	10 km	MPC; JPL
14796 Emmabullock	1977 XF_{2}	Emmabullock	December 7, 1977	Palomar	S. J. Bus	(1298)	13 km	MPC; JPL
14797 Timrose	1977 XZ_{2}	Timrose	December 7, 1977	Palomar	S. J. Bus	KOR	6.0 km	MPC; JPL
14798	1978 UW_{4}	—	October 27, 1978	Palomar	C. M. Olmstead	V	3.2 km	MPC; JPL
14799 Mitchschulte	1979 MS_{2}	Mitchschulte	June 25, 1979	Siding Spring	E. F. Helin, S. J. Bus	NYS ·	4.3 km	MPC; JPL
14800	1979 MP_{4}	—	June 25, 1979	Siding Spring	E. F. Helin, S. J. Bus	·	3.3 km	MPC; JPL

== 14801–14900 ==
back to top

Designation			Discovery			Properties		Ref
Permanent	Provisional	Named after	Date	Site	Discoverer(s)	Category	Diam.	Ref
14801	1980 PE_{3}	—	August 15, 1980	Siding Spring	Royal Observatory Edinburgh	·	6.1 km	MPC; JPL
14802 Robwardell	1981 DJ_{2}	Robwardell	February 28, 1981	Siding Spring	S. J. Bus	·	6.6 km	MPC; JPL
14803 Gooding	1981 EL_{7}	Gooding	March 1, 1981	Siding Spring	S. J. Bus	PHO	4.7 km	MPC; JPL
14804 Mariekschmidt	1981 EW_{13}	Mariekschmidt	March 1, 1981	Siding Spring	S. J. Bus	·	3.7 km	MPC; JPL
14805 Amandaostwald	1981 ED_{15}	Amandaostwald	March 1, 1981	Siding Spring	S. J. Bus	fast?	4.2 km	MPC; JPL
14806 Karner	1981 EV_{25}	Karner	March 2, 1981	Siding Spring	S. J. Bus	·	4.1 km	MPC; JPL
14807 Chrisanders	1981 EN_{26}	Chrisanders	March 2, 1981	Siding Spring	S. J. Bus	DOR	6.3 km	MPC; JPL
14808 Mijjum	1981 EV_{27}	Mijjum	March 2, 1981	Siding Spring	S. J. Bus	·	6.6 km	MPC; JPL
14809 Zoewilbur	1981 ES_{28}	Zoewilbur	March 6, 1981	Siding Spring	S. J. Bus	·	4.7 km	MPC; JPL
14810 Balistreri	1981 EM_{31}	Balistreri	March 2, 1981	Siding Spring	S. J. Bus	·	4.2 km	MPC; JPL
14811	1981 ED_{43}	—	March 2, 1981	Siding Spring	S. J. Bus	DOR	11 km	MPC; JPL
14812 Rosario	1981 JR_{1}	Rosario	May 9, 1981	El Leoncito	Félix Aguilar Observatory	PHO	4.9 km	MPC; JPL
14813	1981 QW_{2}	—	August 23, 1981	La Silla	H. Debehogne	·	2.3 km	MPC; JPL
14814 Gurij	1981 RL_{2}	Gurij	September 7, 1981	Nauchnij	L. G. Karachkina	·	8.3 km	MPC; JPL
14815 Rutberg	1981 TH_{3}	Rutberg	October 7, 1981	Nauchnij	T. M. Smirnova	slow	3.7 km	MPC; JPL
14816	1981 UQ_{22}	—	October 24, 1981	Palomar	S. J. Bus	·	4.4 km	MPC; JPL
14817	1982 FJ_{3}	—	March 21, 1982	La Silla	H. Debehogne	·	2.2 km	MPC; JPL
14818 Mindeli	1982 UF_{7}	Mindeli	October 21, 1982	Nauchnij	L. G. Karachkina	·	15 km	MPC; JPL
14819 Nikolaylaverov	1982 UC_{11}	Nikolaylaverov	October 25, 1982	Nauchnij	L. V. Zhuravleva	slow	3.5 km	MPC; JPL
14820 Aizuyaichi	1982 VF_{4}	Aizuyaichi	November 14, 1982	Kiso	H. Kosai, K. Furukawa	·	2.9 km	MPC; JPL
14821 Motaeno	1982 VG_{4}	Motaeno	November 14, 1982	Kiso	H. Kosai, K. Furukawa	·	2.7 km	MPC; JPL
14822	1984 SR_{5}	—	September 21, 1984	La Silla	H. Debehogne	·	17 km	MPC; JPL
14823	1984 ST_{5}	—	September 21, 1984	La Silla	H. Debehogne	NYS	3.2 km	MPC; JPL
14824	1985 CF_{2}	—	February 13, 1985	La Silla	H. Debehogne	·	3.5 km	MPC; JPL
14825 Fieber-Beyer	1985 RQ	Fieber-Beyer	September 14, 1985	Anderson Mesa	E. Bowell	·	3.2 km	MPC; JPL
14826 Nicollier	1985 SC_{1}	Nicollier	September 16, 1985	Zimmerwald	P. Wild	·	12 km	MPC; JPL
14827 Hypnos	1986 JK	Hypnos	May 5, 1986	Palomar	C. S. Shoemaker, E. M. Shoemaker	T_{j} (2.93) · APO · PHA	900 m	MPC; JPL
14828	1986 QT_{1}	—	August 27, 1986	La Silla	H. Debehogne	NYS	3.3 km	MPC; JPL
14829 Povalyaeva	1986 TR_{11}	Povalyaeva	October 3, 1986	Nauchnij	L. G. Karachkina	·	4.8 km	MPC; JPL
14830	1986 XR_{5}	—	December 5, 1986	Harvard Observatory	Oak Ridge Observatory	·	8.3 km	MPC; JPL
14831 Gentileschi	1987 BS_{1}	Gentileschi	January 22, 1987	La Silla	E. W. Elst	EUN	5.3 km	MPC; JPL
14832 Alechinsky	1987 QC_{3}	Alechinsky	August 27, 1987	La Silla	E. W. Elst	·	4.4 km	MPC; JPL
14833 Vilenius	1987 SP_{1}	Vilenius	September 21, 1987	Anderson Mesa	E. Bowell	·	3.1 km	MPC; JPL
14834 Isaev	1987 SR_{17}	Isaev	September 17, 1987	Nauchnij	L. I. Chernykh	·	2.7 km	MPC; JPL
14835 Holdridge	1987 WF_{1}	Holdridge	November 26, 1987	Palomar	C. S. Shoemaker, E. M. Shoemaker	PHO	6.7 km	MPC; JPL
14836 Maxfrisch	1988 CY	Maxfrisch	February 14, 1988	Tautenburg Observatory	F. Börngen	·	14 km	MPC; JPL
14837	1988 RN_{2}	—	September 8, 1988	Brorfelde	P. Jensen	·	9.1 km	MPC; JPL
14838	1988 RK_{6}	—	September 6, 1988	La Silla	H. Debehogne	V	2.8 km	MPC; JPL
14839	1988 RH_{8}	—	September 11, 1988	Smolyan	V. G. Shkodrov	·	2.7 km	MPC; JPL
14840	1988 RR_{11}	—	September 14, 1988	Cerro Tololo	S. J. Bus	·	1.7 km	MPC; JPL
14841	1988 TU	—	October 13, 1988	Kushiro	S. Ueda, H. Kaneda	·	3.8 km	MPC; JPL
14842	1988 TN_{1}	—	October 13, 1988	Kushiro	S. Ueda, H. Kaneda	EUN	6.1 km	MPC; JPL
14843 Tanna	1988 VP_{3}	Tanna	November 12, 1988	Gekko	Y. Oshima	·	2.1 km	MPC; JPL
14844	1988 VT_{3}	—	November 14, 1988	Kushiro	S. Ueda, H. Kaneda	·	3.6 km	MPC; JPL
14845 Hegel	1988 VS_{6}	Hegel	November 3, 1988	Tautenburg Observatory	F. Börngen	3:2	14 km	MPC; JPL
14846 Lampedusa	1989 BH	Lampedusa	January 29, 1989	Bologna	San Vittore	·	5.8 km	MPC; JPL
14847	1989 CY_{2}	—	February 4, 1989	La Silla	E. W. Elst	·	2.1 km	MPC; JPL
14848	1989 GK_{1}	—	April 3, 1989	La Silla	E. W. Elst	EOS	6.4 km	MPC; JPL
14849	1989 GQ_{1}	—	April 3, 1989	La Silla	E. W. Elst	·	7.2 km	MPC; JPL
14850 Nagashimacho	1989 QH	Nagashimacho	August 29, 1989	Kitami	K. Endate, K. Watanabe	·	3.4 km	MPC; JPL
14851	1989 SD	—	September 23, 1989	Kani	Y. Mizuno, T. Furuta	·	2.9 km	MPC; JPL
14852	1989 SE	—	September 23, 1989	Kani	Y. Mizuno, T. Furuta	(5)	4.4 km	MPC; JPL
14853 Shimokawa	1989 SX	Shimokawa	September 30, 1989	Kitami	K. Endate, K. Watanabe	·	7.7 km	MPC; JPL
14854	1989 SO_{1}	—	September 26, 1989	La Silla	E. W. Elst	·	3.8 km	MPC; JPL
14855	1989 SP_{9}	—	September 25, 1989	La Silla	H. Debehogne	·	5.5 km	MPC; JPL
14856	1989 SY_{13}	—	September 26, 1989	Calar Alto	J. M. Baur, K. Birkle	EUN	4.2 km	MPC; JPL
14857	1989 TT	—	October 1, 1989	Palomar	E. F. Helin	·	5.1 km	MPC; JPL
14858	1989 UW_{3}	—	October 27, 1989	Palomar	E. F. Helin	EUN	5.3 km	MPC; JPL
14859	1989 WU_{1}	—	November 25, 1989	Kushiro	S. Ueda, H. Kaneda	·	4.3 km	MPC; JPL
14860	1989 WD_{3}	—	November 27, 1989	Gekko	Y. Oshima	·	7.0 km	MPC; JPL
14861	1990 DA_{2}	—	February 24, 1990	La Silla	H. Debehogne	·	9.4 km	MPC; JPL
14862	1990 EQ_{2}	—	March 2, 1990	La Silla	E. W. Elst	·	2.7 km	MPC; JPL
14863	1990 OK	—	July 18, 1990	Palomar	E. F. Helin	·	3.5 km	MPC; JPL
14864	1990 QK_{4}	—	August 23, 1990	Palomar	H. E. Holt	NYS	3.9 km	MPC; JPL
14865	1990 QE_{7}	—	August 20, 1990	La Silla	E. W. Elst	·	3.6 km	MPC; JPL
14866	1990 RF_{1}	—	September 14, 1990	Palomar	H. E. Holt	·	9.0 km	MPC; JPL
14867	1990 RW_{4}	—	September 15, 1990	Palomar	H. E. Holt	HYG	13 km	MPC; JPL
14868	1990 RA_{7}	—	September 13, 1990	La Silla	H. Debehogne	·	5.8 km	MPC; JPL
14869	1990 ST_{8}	—	September 22, 1990	La Silla	E. W. Elst	NYS	5.9 km	MPC; JPL
14870	1990 SM_{14}	—	September 24, 1990	La Silla	H. Debehogne	·	5.4 km	MPC; JPL
14871 Pyramus	1990 TH_{7}	Pyramus	October 13, 1990	Tautenburg Observatory	L. D. Schmadel, F. Börngen	CYB · 2:1J	9.2 km	MPC; JPL
14872 Hoher List	1990 UR	Hoher List	October 23, 1990	Hoher List	E. W. Elst	NYS	4.7 km	MPC; JPL
14873 Shoyo	1990 UQ_{2}	Shoyo	October 28, 1990	Minami-Oda	K. Kawanishi, M. Sugano	·	5.3 km	MPC; JPL
14874	1990 US_{4}	—	October 16, 1990	La Silla	E. W. Elst	·	4.4 km	MPC; JPL
14875	1990 WZ_{1}	—	November 18, 1990	La Silla	E. W. Elst	·	5.2 km	MPC; JPL
14876 Dampier	1990 WD_{2}	Dampier	November 18, 1990	La Silla	E. W. Elst	·	7.1 km	MPC; JPL
14877 Zauberflöte	1990 WC_{9}	Zauberflöte	November 19, 1990	La Silla	E. W. Elst	·	11 km	MPC; JPL
14878	1990 WE_{9}	—	November 19, 1990	La Silla	E. W. Elst	NYS ·	6.3 km	MPC; JPL
14879	1991 AL_{2}	—	January 7, 1991	Siding Spring	R. H. McNaught	·	4.3 km	MPC; JPL
14880 Moa	1991 CJ_{1}	Moa	February 7, 1991	Geisei	T. Seki	·	4.6 km	MPC; JPL
14881	1991 PK	—	August 5, 1991	Palomar	H. E. Holt	·	2.0 km	MPC; JPL
14882	1991 PP_{11}	—	August 9, 1991	Palomar	H. E. Holt	·	6.2 km	MPC; JPL
14883	1991 PT_{11}	—	August 7, 1991	Palomar	H. E. Holt	·	9.3 km	MPC; JPL
14884	1991 PH_{16}	—	August 7, 1991	Palomar	H. E. Holt	·	3.8 km	MPC; JPL
14885 Paskoff	1991 RF_{2}	Paskoff	September 6, 1991	Haute-Provence	E. W. Elst	EOS	10 km	MPC; JPL
14886	1991 RL_{9}	—	September 11, 1991	Palomar	H. E. Holt	NYS	6.2 km	MPC; JPL
14887	1991 RQ_{14}	—	September 15, 1991	Palomar	H. E. Holt	THM	8.6 km	MPC; JPL
14888 Kanazawashi	1991 SN_{1}	Kanazawashi	September 30, 1991	Kitami	K. Endate, K. Watanabe	·	3.0 km	MPC; JPL
14889	1991 VX_{2}	—	November 5, 1991	Dynic	A. Sugie	HYG	14 km	MPC; JPL
14890	1991 VG_{3}	—	November 4, 1991	Palomar	E. F. Helin	PHO	3.5 km	MPC; JPL
14891	1991 VY_{4}	—	November 5, 1991	Kiyosato	S. Otomo	NYS	8.0 km	MPC; JPL
14892	1991 VE_{5}	—	November 4, 1991	Kiyosato	S. Otomo	·	4.2 km	MPC; JPL
14893	1992 DN_{6}	—	February 29, 1992	La Silla	UESAC	·	5.1 km	MPC; JPL
14894	1992 EA_{8}	—	March 2, 1992	La Silla	UESAC	KOR	3.5 km	MPC; JPL
14895	1992 EJ_{24}	—	March 2, 1992	La Silla	UESAC	·	3.8 km	MPC; JPL
14896	1992 EB_{26}	—	March 8, 1992	La Silla	UESAC	·	3.1 km	MPC; JPL
14897	1992 GE_{5}	—	April 6, 1992	La Silla	E. W. Elst	KOR	4.0 km	MPC; JPL
14898	1992 JR_{3}	—	May 7, 1992	La Silla	H. Debehogne	·	4.4 km	MPC; JPL
14899	1992 LS	—	June 3, 1992	Palomar	G. J. Leonard	·	4.1 km	MPC; JPL
14900	1992 RH_{5}	—	September 2, 1992	La Silla	E. W. Elst	·	4.4 km	MPC; JPL

== 14901–15000 ==
back to top

Designation			Discovery			Properties		Ref
Permanent	Provisional	Named after	Date	Site	Discoverer(s)	Category	Diam.	Ref
14901 Hidatakayama	1992 SH	Hidatakayama	September 21, 1992	Kitami	M. Yanai, K. Watanabe	EUN	6.6 km	MPC; JPL
14902 Miyairi	1993 BE_{2}	Miyairi	January 17, 1993	Yatsugatake	Y. Kushida, O. Muramatsu	EOS	12 km	MPC; JPL
14903	1993 DF_{2}	—	February 25, 1993	Kushiro	S. Ueda, H. Kaneda	·	3.0 km	MPC; JPL
14904	1993 FM_{14}	—	March 17, 1993	La Silla	UESAC	·	2.8 km	MPC; JPL
14905	1993 FV_{27}	—	March 21, 1993	La Silla	UESAC	·	2.5 km	MPC; JPL
14906	1993 NJ_{1}	—	July 12, 1993	La Silla	E. W. Elst	·	5.3 km	MPC; JPL
14907	1993 OF_{3}	—	July 20, 1993	La Silla	E. W. Elst	·	4.9 km	MPC; JPL
14908	1993 OQ_{4}	—	July 20, 1993	La Silla	E. W. Elst	NYS	3.5 km	MPC; JPL
14909 Kamchatka	1993 PY_{3}	Kamchatka	August 14, 1993	Caussols	E. W. Elst	EUN	5.4 km	MPC; JPL
14910	1993 QR_{4}	—	August 18, 1993	Caussols	E. W. Elst	·	7.4 km	MPC; JPL
14911 Fukamatsu	1993 RH_{2}	Fukamatsu	September 15, 1993	Kitami	K. Endate, K. Watanabe	EUN	4.3 km	MPC; JPL
14912	1993 RP_{3}	—	September 12, 1993	Palomar	PCAS	·	6.5 km	MPC; JPL
14913	1993 RP_{7}	—	September 15, 1993	La Silla	E. W. Elst	·	3.3 km	MPC; JPL
14914 Moreux	1993 TM_{26}	Moreux	October 9, 1993	La Silla	E. W. Elst	·	3.3 km	MPC; JPL
14915	1993 UM_{8}	—	October 20, 1993	La Silla	E. W. Elst	MAR	4.1 km	MPC; JPL
14916	1993 VV_{7}	—	November 10, 1993	Siding Spring	G. J. Garradd	(14916)	7.6 km	MPC; JPL
14917 Taco	1994 AD_{11}	Taco	January 8, 1994	Kitt Peak	Spacewatch	·	9.4 km	MPC; JPL
14918 Gonzálezalegre	1994 BP_{4}	Gonzálezalegre	January 21, 1994	Mérida	Naranjo, O. A.	·	8.6 km	MPC; JPL
14919 Robertohaver	1994 PG	Robertohaver	August 6, 1994	San Marcello	A. Boattini, M. Tombelli	PHO	4.0 km	MPC; JPL
14920	1994 PE_{33}	—	August 12, 1994	La Silla	E. W. Elst	slow	4.7 km	MPC; JPL
14921	1994 QA	—	August 16, 1994	Siding Spring	G. J. Garradd	PHO	3.7 km	MPC; JPL
14922 Ohyama	1994 TA_{3}	Ohyama	October 2, 1994	Kitami	K. Endate, K. Watanabe	·	2.7 km	MPC; JPL
14923	1994 TU_{3}	—	October 7, 1994	Palomar	K. J. Lawrence	·	4.9 km	MPC; JPL
14924	1994 VZ	—	November 3, 1994	Nachi-Katsuura	Y. Shimizu, T. Urata	V	2.7 km	MPC; JPL
14925 Naoko	1994 VU_{2}	Naoko	November 4, 1994	Kitami	K. Endate, K. Watanabe	·	3.3 km	MPC; JPL
14926 Hoshide	1994 VB_{3}	Hoshide	November 4, 1994	Kitami	K. Endate, K. Watanabe	·	3.4 km	MPC; JPL
14927 Satoshi	1994 VW_{6}	Satoshi	November 1, 1994	Kitami	K. Endate, K. Watanabe	·	4.4 km	MPC; JPL
14928	1994 WN_{1}	—	November 27, 1994	Oizumi	T. Kobayashi	MAS	3.1 km	MPC; JPL
14929	1994 WP_{1}	—	November 27, 1994	Oizumi	T. Kobayashi	(5)	2.9 km	MPC; JPL
14930	1994 WL_{3}	—	November 28, 1994	Kushiro	S. Ueda, H. Kaneda	·	3.5 km	MPC; JPL
14931	1994 WR_{3}	—	November 27, 1994	Uto	F. Uto	EUN	7.1 km	MPC; JPL
14932	1994 YC	—	December 24, 1994	Oizumi	T. Kobayashi	(5)	4.4 km	MPC; JPL
14933	1994 YX	—	December 28, 1994	Oizumi	T. Kobayashi	·	3.9 km	MPC; JPL
14934	1995 BP	—	January 23, 1995	Oizumi	T. Kobayashi	·	7.3 km	MPC; JPL
14935	1995 BP_{1}	—	January 25, 1995	Oizumi	T. Kobayashi	·	9.8 km	MPC; JPL
14936	1995 BU_{2}	—	January 27, 1995	Nachi-Katsuura	Y. Shimizu, T. Urata	MAR	6.6 km	MPC; JPL
14937 Thirsk	1995 CP_{3}	Thirsk	February 1, 1995	Kitt Peak	Spacewatch	·	2.9 km	MPC; JPL
14938	1995 DN	—	February 21, 1995	Oizumi	T. Kobayashi	GEF	7.4 km	MPC; JPL
14939 Norikura	1995 DG_{1}	Norikura	February 21, 1995	Kuma Kogen	A. Nakamura	MRX	2.4 km	MPC; JPL
14940 Freiligrath	1995 EL_{8}	Freiligrath	March 4, 1995	Tautenburg Observatory	F. Börngen	·	6.7 km	MPC; JPL
14941 Tomswift	1995 FY_{2}	Tomswift	March 23, 1995	Kitt Peak	Spacewatch	GEF	3.6 km	MPC; JPL
14942 Stevebaker	1995 MA	Stevebaker	June 21, 1995	Haleakala	AMOS	URS	11 km	MPC; JPL
14943	1995 VD_{19}	—	November 15, 1995	Xinglong	SCAP	·	2.6 km	MPC; JPL
14944	1995 YV	—	December 19, 1995	Oizumi	T. Kobayashi	(2076)	2.7 km	MPC; JPL
14945	1995 YM_{3}	—	December 27, 1995	Oizumi	T. Kobayashi	·	3.5 km	MPC; JPL
14946	1996 AN_{2}	—	January 13, 1996	Oizumi	T. Kobayashi	·	2.4 km	MPC; JPL
14947 Luigibussolino	1996 AB_{4}	Luigibussolino	January 15, 1996	Asiago	M. Tombelli, U. Munari	·	2.3 km	MPC; JPL
14948 Bartuška	1996 BA	Bartuška	January 16, 1996	Kleť	J. Tichá, M. Tichý	BAP	3.5 km	MPC; JPL
14949	1996 BA_{2}	—	January 24, 1996	Oizumi	T. Kobayashi	V · slow	2.9 km	MPC; JPL
14950 Alexandradelbo	1996 BE_{2}	Alexandradelbo	January 18, 1996	Kushiro	S. Ueda, H. Kaneda	·	6.2 km	MPC; JPL
14951	1996 BS_{2}	—	January 26, 1996	Oizumi	T. Kobayashi	·	4.8 km	MPC; JPL
14952	1996 CQ	—	February 1, 1996	Xinglong	SCAP	·	5.7 km	MPC; JPL
14953 Bevilacqua	1996 CB_{3}	Bevilacqua	February 13, 1996	Asiago	M. Tombelli, G. Forti	·	2.3 km	MPC; JPL
14954	1996 DL	—	February 16, 1996	Haleakala	NEAT	·	1.9 km	MPC; JPL
14955	1996 DX	—	February 21, 1996	Oizumi	T. Kobayashi	NYS	3.3 km	MPC; JPL
14956	1996 DB_{1}	—	February 22, 1996	Oizumi	T. Kobayashi	·	3.4 km	MPC; JPL
14957	1996 HQ_{22}	—	April 20, 1996	La Silla	E. W. Elst	·	4.0 km	MPC; JPL
14958	1996 JK_{1}	—	May 15, 1996	Haleakala	NEAT	·	6.9 km	MPC; JPL
14959 TRIUMF	1996 JT_{3}	TRIUMF	May 9, 1996	Kitt Peak	Spacewatch	·	7.0 km	MPC; JPL
14960 Yule	1996 KO	Yule	May 21, 1996	Prescott	P. G. Comba	·	4.6 km	MPC; JPL
14961 d'Auteroche	1996 LV_{3}	d'Auteroche	June 8, 1996	La Silla	E. W. Elst	·	7.0 km	MPC; JPL
14962 Masanoriabe	1996 TL_{15}	Masanoriabe	October 9, 1996	Nanyo	T. Okuni	·	26 km	MPC; JPL
14963 Toshikazu	1996 TM_{15}	Toshikazu	October 11, 1996	Nanyo	T. Okuni	THM	12 km	MPC; JPL
14964 Robertobacci	1996 VS	Robertobacci	November 2, 1996	San Marcello	L. Tesi, G. Cattani	·	8.2 km	MPC; JPL
14965 Bonk	1997 KC	Bonk	May 24, 1997	Bornheim	Ehring, N.	PHO	4.4 km	MPC; JPL
14966 Jurijvega	1997 OU_{2}	Jurijvega	July 30, 1997	Črni Vrh	Mikuž, H.	·	2.3 km	MPC; JPL
14967 Madrid	1997 PF_{4}	Madrid	August 6, 1997	Majorca	Á. López J., R. Pacheco	·	4.2 km	MPC; JPL
14968 Kubáček	1997 QG	Kubáček	August 23, 1997	Modra	A. Galád, Pravda, A.	·	4.8 km	MPC; JPL
14969 Willacather	1997 QC_{1}	Willacather	August 28, 1997	Lime Creek	R. Linderholm	·	3.3 km	MPC; JPL
14970	1997 QA_{2}	—	August 25, 1997	Dynic	A. Sugie	HOF	3.5 km	MPC; JPL
14971	1997 QN_{3}	—	August 30, 1997	Caussols	ODAS	·	8.9 km	MPC; JPL
14972 Olihainaut	1997 QP_{3}	Olihainaut	August 30, 1997	Caussols	ODAS	·	4.4 km	MPC; JPL
14973 Rossirosina	1997 RZ	Rossirosina	September 1, 1997	San Marcello	A. Boattini	·	8.1 km	MPC; JPL
14974 Počátky	1997 SK_{1}	Počátky	September 22, 1997	Kleť	M. Tichý	·	4.0 km	MPC; JPL
14975 Serasin	1997 SA_{3}	Serasin	September 24, 1997	Farra d'Isonzo	Farra d'Isonzo	·	4.8 km	MPC; JPL
14976 Josefčapek	1997 SD_{4}	Josefčapek	September 27, 1997	Ondřejov	P. Pravec	HYG	6.6 km	MPC; JPL
14977 Bressler	1997 SE_{4}	Bressler	September 26, 1997	Linz	E. Meyer	KOR	4.9 km	MPC; JPL
14978	1997 SD_{25}	—	September 30, 1997	Uenohara	N. Kawasato	EOS	7.7 km	MPC; JPL
14979	1997 TK_{1}	—	October 3, 1997	Caussols	ODAS	slow	4.9 km	MPC; JPL
14980 Gustavbrom	1997 TW_{9}	Gustavbrom	October 5, 1997	Ondřejov	L. Kotková	slow	6.8 km	MPC; JPL
14981 Uenoiwakura	1997 TY_{17}	Uenoiwakura	October 6, 1997	Kitami	K. Endate, K. Watanabe	KOR	5.3 km	MPC; JPL
14982	1997 TH_{19}	—	October 8, 1997	Gekko	T. Kagawa, T. Urata	·	4.8 km	MPC; JPL
14983	1997 TE_{25}	—	October 12, 1997	Rand	G. R. Viscome	(5)	3.8 km	MPC; JPL
14984	1997 TN_{26}	—	October 11, 1997	Kushiro	S. Ueda, H. Kaneda	EUN	8.1 km	MPC; JPL
14985	1997 UU_{2}	—	October 25, 1997	Oohira	T. Urata	·	5.5 km	MPC; JPL
14986	1997 UJ_{3}	—	October 26, 1997	Oizumi	T. Kobayashi	AGN	5.6 km	MPC; JPL
14987	1997 UT_{3}	—	October 26, 1997	Oizumi	T. Kobayashi	THM	7.7 km	MPC; JPL
14988 Tryggvason	1997 UA_{7}	Tryggvason	October 25, 1997	Kitt Peak	Spacewatch	·	14 km	MPC; JPL
14989 Tutte	1997 UB_{7}	Tutte	October 25, 1997	Kitt Peak	Spacewatch	·	7.0 km	MPC; JPL
14990 Zermelo	1997 UY_{10}	Zermelo	October 31, 1997	Prescott	P. G. Comba	KOR	5.6 km	MPC; JPL
14991	1997 UV_{14}	—	October 31, 1997	Woomera	F. B. Zoltowski	·	15 km	MPC; JPL
14992	1997 UY_{14}	—	October 26, 1997	Nachi-Katsuura	Y. Shimizu, T. Urata	KOR	6.5 km	MPC; JPL
14993	1997 UC_{15}	—	October 26, 1997	Nachi-Katsuura	Y. Shimizu, T. Urata	·	9.3 km	MPC; JPL
14994 Uppenkamp	1997 UW_{18}	Uppenkamp	October 28, 1997	Kitt Peak	Spacewatch	CYB	20 km	MPC; JPL
14995 Archytas	1997 VY_{1}	Archytas	November 5, 1997	Prescott	P. G. Comba	·	16 km	MPC; JPL
14996	1997 VY_{2}	—	November 5, 1997	Dynic	A. Sugie	·	8.2 km	MPC; JPL
14997	1997 VD_{4}	—	November 1, 1997	Kushiro	S. Ueda, H. Kaneda	KOR	8.8 km	MPC; JPL
14998 Ogosemachi	1997 VU_{6}	Ogosemachi	November 1, 1997	Kitami	K. Endate, K. Watanabe	KOR	4.1 km	MPC; JPL
14999 Karasaki	1997 VX_{8}	Karasaki	November 9, 1997	Nyukasa	M. Hirasawa, S. Suzuki	EUN	9.0 km	MPC; JPL
15000 CCD	1997 WZ_{16}	CCD	November 23, 1997	Kitt Peak	Spacewatch	GEF	3.6 km	MPC; JPL

back to top

== See also ==
- Meanings of minor-planet names: 14001–15000
