= Viscome =

Viscome may refer to:

- George R. Viscome (born 1956), American astronomer
- 6183 Viscome, main-belt asteroid
