= Masaru Mukai =

Japanese astronomer (born 1949)

Minor planets discovered: 13
4703 Kagoshima^{[1]}	January 16, 1988
5139 Rumoi^{[1]}	November 13, 1990
5286 Haruomukai^{[1]}	November 4, 1989
5468 Hamatonbetsu^{[1]}	January 16, 1988
5640 Yoshino^{[1]}	October 21, 1989
5960 Wakkanai^{[1]}	October 21, 1989
8866 Tanegashima^{[1]}	January 26, 1992
9368 Esashi^{[1]}	January 26, 1993
10516 Sakurajima^{[1]}	November 1, 1989
11064 Dogen^{[1]}	November 30, 1991
14446 Kinkowan^{[1]}	October 31, 1992
15790 Keizan^{[1]}	October 8, 1993
(48498) 1993 BS_{6}^{[1]}	January 30, 1993
1. ^{1} co-discovery with M. Takeishi

Masaru Mukai (向井 優, Mukai Masaru; born 1949) is a Japanese astronomer. He is credited with the discovery of 13 asteroids by the Minor Planet Center.
