= Gabriele Cattani =

Italian astronomer

Minor planets discovered: 18
see § List of discovered minor planets

Gabriele Cattani is an Italian astronomer. Between 1994 and 1997, he has co-discovered 18 numbered asteroids together with astronomer Luciano Tesi at the Pistoia Mountains Astronomical Observatory including the main-belt asteroid 8051 Pistoria.

== List of discovered minor planets ==
| 8051 Pistoria | 13 August 1997 | list^{[A]} |
| 11625 Francelinda | 20 October 1996 | list^{[A]} |
| 12840 Paolaferrari | 6 April 1997 | list^{[A]} |
| 13200 Romagnani | 13 March 1997 | list^{[A]} |
| 14486 Tuscia | 4 October 1994 | list^{[A]} |
| 14964 Robertobacci | 2 November 1996 | list^{[A]} |
| 16683 Alepieri | 3 May 1994 | list^{[A]} |
| 23547 Tognelli | 17 February 1994 | list^{[A]} |
| 27917 Edoardo | 6 November 1996 | list^{[A]} |
| 29443 Remocorti | 13 July 1997 | list^{[A]} |

| 33010 Enricoprosperi | 11 March 1997 | list^{[A]} |
| 39748 Guccini | 28 January 1997 | list^{[A]} |
| 42523 Ragazzileonardo | 6 March 1994 | list^{[A]} |
| 79212 Martadigrazia | 6 March 1994 | list^{[A]} |
| (85439) 1997 EP_{40} | 13 March 1997 | list^{[A]} |
| 152583 Saône | 4 October 1994 | list^{[A]} |
| (205006) 1997 AY_{21} | 15 January 1997 | list^{[A]} |
| 296928 Francescopalla | 17 February 1994 | list^{[A]} |
Co-discovery made with:^{A} L. Tesi

== See also ==
- List of minor planet discoverers
