= George R. Viscome =

American astronomer

Minor planets discovered: 33
see § List of discovered minor planets

George R. Viscome (born 1956) is an American astronomer and a discoverer of minor planets. He also worked as a broadcast technician in Albany, New York.

Viscome has discovered 33 asteroids. Asteroid 6183 Viscome, discovered by Carolyn Shoemaker at the Palomar Observatory in 1987, was named in his honor. The official naming citation was published by the Minor Planet Center on 15 February 1995 (M.P.C. 24766).

== List of discovered minor planets ==
10194 Tonygeorge	18 August 1996	list
10379 Lake Placid	18 July 1996	list
10895 Aynrand	11 October 1997	list
14075 Kenwill	18 July 1996	list
(14093) 1997 OM	26 July 1997	list
(14529) 1997 NR_{2}	6 July 1997	list
(14531) 1997 PM_{2}	7 August 1997	list
(14983) 1997 TE_{25}	12 October 1997	list
17638 Sualan	11 August 1996	list
(17642) 1996 TY_{4}	6 October 1996	list

(18502) 1996 PK_{1}	11 August 1996	list
(27950) 1997 OF_{1}	30 July 1997	list
(29454) 1997 RZ_{6}	9 September 1997	list
(31125) 1997 SL_{1}	22 September 1997	list
(32962) 1996 PH_{1}	11 August 1996	list
(32963) 1996 PJ_{1}	11 August 1996	list
(32966) 1996 PE_{5}	15 August 1996	list
(35279) 1996 SR	20 September 1996	list
35283 Bradtimerson	5 October 1996	list
(44004) 1997 SS_{3}	25 September 1997	list

(52594) 1997 RF_{3}	5 September 1997	list
(52598) 1997 SR_{3}	25 September 1997	list
(52607) 1997 TX_{16}	7 October 1997	list
(65866) 1997 PA_{4}	10 August 1997	list
(69549) 1997 LC_{4}	9 June 1997	list
(85482) 1997 PL_{2}	7 August 1997	list
(100459) 1996 TB_{5}	6 October 1996	list
(101506) 1998 XP_{17}	13 December 1998	list
(120714) 1997 SQ_{3}	25 September 1997	list
(160529) 1996 TN_{1}	6 October 1996	list

(192416) 1997 MA_{1}	28 June 1997	list
(221983) 1996 PJ_{2}	12 August 1996	list
(267036) 1997 SC_{11}	27 September 1997	list

== See also ==
- List of minor planet discoverers § G. R. Viscome
