= C. Michelle Olmstead =

American astronomer

Minor planets discovered: 46
(5633) 1978 UL7	October 27, 1978
(6360) 1978 UA7	October 27, 1978
(7510) 1978 UF_{6}	October 27, 1978
(7914) 1978 UW_{7}	October 27, 1978
(8363) 1990 RV	September 13, 1990
(10998) 1978 UN_{4}	October 27, 1978
(11447) 1978 UL_{4}	October 27, 1978
(13907) 1977 RS_{17}	September 9, 1977
(14319) 1978 US_{5}	October 27, 1978
(14320) 1978 UV_{7}	October 27, 1978
(14798) 1978 UW_{4}	October 27, 1978
(17359) 1978 UP_{4}	October 27, 1978
(17360) 1978 UX_{5}	October 27, 1978
(17361) 1978 UF_{7}	October 27, 1978
(19085) 1978 UR_{4}	October 27, 1978
(23407) 1977 RG_{19}	September 9, 1977
(23412) 1978 UN_{5}	October 27, 1978
(24612) 1978 UE_{6}	October 27, 1978
(27661) 1978 UK_{6}	October 27, 1978
(27662) 1978 UK_{7}	October 27, 1978
(29184) 1990 SL_{10}	September 17, 1990
(30819) 1990 RL_{2}	September 15, 1990
(32736) 1978 UE_{5}	October 27, 1978
(32737) 1978 UZ_{6}	October 27, 1978
(39470) 1978 UB_{7}	October 27, 1978
(39471) 1978 UF_{8}	October 27, 1978
(43726) 1978 UJ_{5}	October 27, 1978
(48382) 1978 UC_{6}	October 27, 1978
(52232) 1978 UY_{4}	October 27, 1978
(52233) 1978 UQ_{5}	October 27, 1978
(52234) 1978 UX_{7}	October 27, 1978
(55721) 1978 UX_{4}	October 27, 1978
(69232) 1978 UJ_{4}	October 27, 1978
(69233) 1978 UL_{6}	October 27, 1978
(73643) 1978 UA_{5}	October 27, 1978
(73644) 1978 UD_{7}	October 27, 1978
(85175) 1990 RS	September 13, 1990
(90674) 1978 UD_{5}	October 27, 1978
(90675) 1978 UQ_{6}	October 27, 1978
(96158) 1978 UE_{8}	October 27, 1978
(99955) 1978 UM_{5}	October 27, 1978
(192281) 1978 UC_{7}	October 27, 1978

C. Michelle Olmstead (born 21 May 1969) is an American astronomer, asteroid discoverer and computer scientist.

== Early life and education ==
Olmstead attended Northern Arizona University as an undergraduate student in physics and astronomy from 1989-1993, where she was a NASA undergraduate fellow and participated in several asteroid astrometry programs and made measurements using existing survey work.

== Career ==
She is credited by the Minor Planet Center with the discovery of 46 asteroids for the period between 1977 and 1990. In 1990, with Henry E. Holt, she co-discovered 127P/Holt-Olmstead, a periodic comet that bears her name.

The minor planet 3287 Olmstead, a Mars-crosser asteroid discovered by astronomer Schelte J. Bus in 1981, was named in her honour. Her lowest numbered discovery, (5633) 1978 UL7, officially discovered at Palomar Observatory in 1978, and presumably taken on photographic plates by Tom Gehrels shortly after the last Palomar–Leiden Survey campaign, had its discovering astrometric observation published on 12 September 1992 (M.P.C. 20706).
