= Kin Endate =

Japanese amateur astronomer

- 円館 金
- Born: December 15, 1960 (age 65); Iwaizumi, Iwate Prefecture
- Occupation: Amateur astronomer
- Known for: Discovering 5648 Axius, 6500 Kodaira
- Awards: 4282 Endate was named after him

Minor planets discovered: 624
see § List of discovered minor planets

Kin Endate (円館 金, Endate Kin; born December 15, 1960) is a Japanese amateur astronomer who has discovered hundreds of asteroids, most of them in collaboration with Kazuro Watanabe, placing him among the most prolific discoverers of minor planets.

== Career in astronomy ==
Kin Endate was born in Iwaizumi in Iwate Prefecture and went to Hokkaido Designers School to study photography. He began taking astrophotos in high school, but did not begin serious asteroid observations until 1986.

His notable discoveries include the minor planets 5648 Axius and 6500 Kodaira, a Jupiter trojan and a Mars-crosser asteroid, respectively. He also recorded the first known precovery images of Comet Shoemaker-Levy 9 with his private 10-inch (25 cm) diameter telescope on March 15, 1993, ten days before the official discovery of the comet. Kin, who was looking specifically for asteroids, did not know of the comet in his images until after the official discovery.

=== Awards and honors ===
The main-belt asteroid 4282 Endate, discovered by his colleagues Seiji Ueda and Hiroshi Kaneda at Kushiro in 1987, was named in his honor. The official naming citation was published by the Minor Planet Center on 8 July 1990 (M.P.C. 16593).

== List of discovered minor planets ==
Most asteroids were discovered by Kin Endate in collaboration with ^{A} Kazuro Watanabe

4042 Okhotsk	15 January 1989	list^{[A]}
4126 Mashu	19 January 1988	list^{[A]}
4460 Bihoro	28 February 1990	list^{[A]}
4491 Otaru	7 September 1988	list^{[A]}
4497 Taguchi	4 January 1989	list^{[A]}
4508 Takatsuki	27 March 1990	list^{[A]}
4547 Massachusetts	16 May 1990	list^{[A]}
4585 Ainonai	16 May 1990	list^{[A]}
4607 Seilandfarm	25 November 1987	list^{[A]}
4641 Ayako	30 August 1990	list^{[A]}
4712 Iwaizumi	25 August 1989	list^{[A]}
4773 Hayakawa	17 November 1989	list^{[A]}
4839 Daisetsuzan	25 August 1989	list^{[A]}
4845 Tsubetsu	5 March 1991	list^{[A]}
4973 Showa	18 March 1990	list^{[A]}
5059 Saroma	11 January 1988	list^{[A]}
5117 Mokotoyama	8 April 1988	list^{[A]}
5187 Domon	15 October 1990	list^{[A]}
5213 Takahashi	18 March 1990	list^{[A]}
5294 Onnetoh	3 February 1991	list^{[A]}
5331 Erimomisaki	27 January 1990	list^{[A]}
5356 Neagari	21 March 1991	list^{[A]}
5372 Bikki	29 November 1987	list^{[A]}
5404 Uemura	15 March 1991	list^{[A]}
5481 Kiuchi	15 February 1990	list^{[A]}

5557 Chimikeppuko	7 February 1989	list^{[A]}
5580 Sharidake	10 September 1988	list^{[A]}
5603 Rausudake	5 February 1992	list^{[A]}
5631 Sekihokutouge	20 March 1993	list^{[A]}
5648 Axius	11 November 1990	list^{[A]}
5679 Akkado	2 November 1989	list^{[A]}
5692 Shirao	23 March 1992	list^{[A]}
5734 Noguchi	15 January 1989	list^{[A]}
5753 Yoshidatadahiko	4 March 1992	list^{[A]}
5847 Wakiya	18 December 1989	list^{[A]}
5850 Masaharu	8 December 1990	list^{[A]}
5868 Ohta	13 October 1988	list^{[A]}
5875 Kuga	5 December 1989	list^{[A]}
5975 Otakemayumi	21 September 1992	list^{[A]}
5978 Kaminokuni	16 November 1992	list^{[A]}
6020 Miyamoto	30 September 1991	list^{[A]}
6022 Jyuro	26 October 1992	list^{[A]}
6023 Tsuyashima	26 October 1992	list^{[A]}
6052 Junichi	9 February 1992	list^{[A]}
6091 Mitsuru	28 February 1990	list^{[A]}
6093 Makoto	30 August 1990	list^{[A]}
6097 Koishikawa	29 October 1991	list^{[A]}
6104 Takao	16 April 1993	list^{[A]}
6140 Kubokawa	6 January 1992	list^{[A]}
6144 Kondojiro	14 March 1994	list^{[A]}

6193 Manabe	18 August 1990	list^{[A]}
6195 Nukariya	13 November 1990	list^{[A]}
6200 Hachinohe	16 April 1993	list^{[A]}
6201 Ichiroshimizu	16 April 1993	list^{[A]}
6208 Wakata	3 December 1988	list^{[A]}
6247 Amanogawa	21 November 1990	list^{[A]}
6274 Taizaburo	23 March 1992	list^{[A]}
6323 Karoji	14 February 1991	list^{[A]}
6330 Koen	23 March 1992	list^{[A]}
6337 Shiota	26 October 1992	list^{[A]}
6338 Isaosato	26 October 1992	list^{[A]}
6340 Kathmandu	15 October 1993	list^{[A]}
6345 Hideo	5 January 1994	list^{[A]}
6389 Ogawa	21 January 1990	list^{[A]}
6390 Hirabayashi	26 January 1990	list^{[A]}
6408 Saijo	28 October 1992	list^{[A]}
6412 Kaifu	15 October 1993	list^{[A]}
6413 Iye	15 October 1993	list^{[A]}
6424 Ando	14 March 1994	list^{[A]}
6459 Hidesan	28 October 1992	list^{[A]}
6463 Isoda	13 January 1994	list^{[A]}
6496 Kazuko	19 October 1992	list^{[A]}
6498 Ko	26 October 1992	list^{[A]}
6500 Kodaira	15 March 1993	list^{[A]}
6526 Matogawa	1 October 1992	list^{[A]}

6558 Norizuki	14 April 1991	list^{[A]}
6565 Reiji	23 March 1992	list^{[A]}
6567 Shigemasa	16 November 1992	list^{[A]}
6570 Tomohiro	6 May 1994	list^{[A]}
6599 Tsuko	8 August 1988	list^{[A]}
6607 Matsushima	29 October 1991	list^{[A]}
6637 Inoue	3 December 1988	list^{[A]}
6650 Morimoto	7 September 1991	list^{[A]}
6656 Yokota	23 March 1992	list^{[A]}
6658 Akiraabe	18 November 1992	list^{[A]}
6669 Obi	5 May 1994	list^{[A]}
6722 Bunichi	23 January 1991	list^{[A]}
6737 Okabayashi	15 March 1993	list^{[A]}
6738 Tanabe	20 March 1993	list^{[A]}
6741 Liyuan	31 March 1994	list^{[A]}
6742 Biandepei	8 April 1994	list^{[A]}
6743 Liu	8 April 1994	list^{[A]}
6744 Komoda	6 May 1994	list^{[A]}
6745 Nishiyama	7 May 1994	list^{[A]}
6832 Kawabata	23 March 1992	list^{[A]}
6867 Kuwano	28 March 1992	list^{[A]}
6869 Funada	2 May 1992	list^{[A]}
6873 Tasaka	21 April 1993	list^{[A]}
6878 Isamu	2 October 1994	list^{[A]}
6905 Miyazaki	15 October 1990	list^{[A]}

6908 Kunimoto	24 November 1990	list^{[A]}
6913 Yukawa	31 October 1991	list^{[A]}
6919 Tomonaga	16 April 1993	list^{[A]}
6920 Esaki	14 May 1993	list^{[A]}
6924 Fukui	8 October 1993	list^{[A]}
6927 Tonegawa	2 October 1994	list^{[A]}
6931 Kenzaburo	4 November 1994	list^{[A]}
6964 Kunihiko	15 October 1990	list^{[A]}
6978 Hironaka	12 September 1993	list^{[A]}
6979 Shigefumi	12 September 1993	list^{[A]}
6980 Kyusakamoto	16 September 1993	list^{[A]}
7035 Gomi	28 January 1995	list^{[A]}
7122 Iwasaki	12 March 1989	list^{[A]}
7128 Misawa	30 September 1991	list^{[A]}
7133 Kasahara	15 October 1993	list^{[A]}
7176 Kuniji	1 December 1989	list^{[A]}
7186 Tomioka	26 December 1991	list^{[A]}
7188 Yoshii	23 September 1992	list^{[A]}
7189 Kuniko	28 September 1992	list^{[A]}
7192 Cieletespace	12 September 1993	list^{[A]}
7193 Yamaoka	19 September 1993	list^{[A]}
7241 Kuroda	11 November 1990	list^{[A]}
7242 Okyudo	11 November 1990	list^{[A]}
7250 Kinoshita	23 September 1992	list^{[A]}
7251 Kuwabara	30 September 1992	list^{[A]}

7254 Kuratani	15 October 1993	list^{[A]}
7293 Kazuyuki	23 March 1992	list^{[A]}
7305 Ossakajusto	8 February 1994	list^{[A]}
7342 Uchinoura	23 March 1992	list^{[A]}
7430 Kogure	23 January 1993	list^{[A]}
7435 Sagamihara	8 February 1994	list^{[A]}
7436 Kuroiwa	8 February 1994	list^{[A]}
7442 Inouehideo	20 September 1995	list^{[A]}
7475 Kaizuka	28 October 1992	list^{[A]}
7483 Sekitakakazu	1 November 1994	list^{[A]}
7530 Mizusawa	15 April 1994	list^{[A]}
7572 Znokai	23 September 1989	list^{[A]}
7590 Aterui	26 October 1992	list^{[A]}
7596 Yumi	10 April 1993	list^{[A]}
7664 Namahage	2 October 1994	list^{[A]}
7674 Kasuga	15 November 1995	list^{[A]}
7766 Jododaira	23 January 1991	list^{[A]}
(7773) 1992 FS	23 March 1992	list^{[A]}
(7774) 1992 UU_{2}	19 October 1992	list^{[A]}
7842 Ishitsuka	1 December 1994	list^{[A]}
7890 Yasuofukui	2 October 1994	list^{[A]}
7954 Kitao	19 September 1993	list^{[A]}
7965 Katsuhiko	17 January 1996	list^{[A]}
8011 Saijokeiichi	29 November 1989	list^{[A]}
8036 Maehara	26 October 1992	list^{[A]}

8040 Utsumikazuhiko	16 September 1993	list^{[A]}
8087 Kazutaka	29 November 1989	list^{[A]}
8097 Yamanishi	12 September 1993	list^{[A]}
8098 Miyamotoatsushi	19 September 1993	list^{[A]}
8156 Tsukada	13 October 1988	list^{[A]}
8159 Fukuoka	24 January 1990	list^{[A]}
8167 Ishii	14 February 1991	list^{[A]}
8194 Satake	16 September 1993	list^{[A]}
8202 Gooley	11 February 1994	list^{[A]}
8204 Takabatake	8 April 1994	list^{[A]}
8231 Tetsujiyamada	6 October 1997	list^{[A]}
8274 Soejima	15 October 1990	list^{[A]}
8286 Kouji	8 March 1992	list^{[A]}
8294 Takayuki	26 October 1992	list^{[A]}
8295 Toshifukushima	26 October 1992	list^{[A]}
8296 Miyama	13 January 1993	list^{[A]}
8314 Tsuji	25 October 1997	list^{[A]}
8377 Elmerreese	23 September 1992	list^{[A]}
8393 Tetsumasakamoto	15 October 1993	list^{[A]}
8406 Iwaokusano	20 April 1995	list^{[A]}
8417 Lancetaylor	7 November 1996	list^{[A]}
8500 Hori	10 October 1990	list^{[A]}
8503 Masakatsu	21 November 1990	list^{[A]}
8526 Takeuchiyukou	23 September 1992	list^{[A]}
8527 Katayama	28 September 1992	list^{[A]}

8529 Sinzi	19 October 1992	list^{[A]}
8531 Mineosaito	16 November 1992	list^{[A]}
8546 Kenmotsu	13 January 1994	list^{[A]}
8548 Sumizihara	14 March 1994	list^{[A]}
8553 Bradsmith	20 April 1995	list^{[A]}
8560 Tsubaki	20 September 1995	list^{[A]}
8575 Seishitakeuchi	7 November 1996	list^{[A]}
8577 Choseikomori	7 November 1996	list^{[A]}
8660 Sano	15 October 1990	list^{[A]}
8693 Matsuki	16 November 1992	list^{[A]}
8712 Suzuko	2 October 1994	list^{[A]}
8713 Azusa	26 January 1995	list^{[A]}
8728 Mimatsu	7 November 1996	list^{[A]}
8874 Showashinzan	26 October 1992	list^{[A]}
8882 Sakaetamura	10 January 1994	list^{[A]}
8891 Irokawa	1 September 1994	list^{[A]}
9067 Katsuno	16 April 1993	list^{[A]}
9074 Yosukeyoshida	31 March 1994	list^{[A]}
9080 Takayanagi	2 October 1994	list^{[A]}
9088 Maki	20 September 1995	list^{[A]}
9090 Chirotenmondai	28 October 1995	list^{[A]}
9206 Yanaikeizo	1 September 1994	list^{[A]}
9208 Takanotoshi	2 October 1994	list^{[A]}
9215 Taiyonoto	28 October 1995	list^{[A]}
9229 Matsuda	20 February 1996	list^{[A]}

9333 Hiraimasa	15 October 1990	list^{[A]}
9362 Miyajima	23 March 1992	list^{[A]}
9375 Omodaka	16 April 1993	list^{[A]}
9382 Mihonoseki	11 October 1993	list^{[A]}
9573 Matsumotomas	16 October 1988	list^{[A]}
9599 Onotomoko	29 October 1991	list^{[A]}
9632 Sudo	15 October 1993	list^{[A]}
9642 Takatahiro	1 September 1994	list^{[A]}
9842 Funakoshi	15 January 1989	list^{[A]}
9845 Okamuraosamu	27 March 1990	list^{[A]}
9851 Sakamoto	24 October 1990	list^{[A]}
9869 Yadoumaru	9 February 1992	list^{[A]}
9967 Awanoyumi	31 March 1992	list^{[A]}
9971 Ishihara	16 April 1993	list^{[A]}
9975 Takimotokoso	12 September 1993	list^{[A]}
10092 Sasaki	15 November 1990	list^{[A]}
10138 Ohtanihiroshi	16 September 1993	list^{[A]}
10146 Mukaitadashi	8 February 1994	list^{[A]}
10155 Numaguti	4 November 1994	list^{[A]}
10182 Junkobiwaki	20 March 1996	list^{[A]}
10301 Kataoka	30 March 1989	list^{[A]}
10304 Iwaki	30 September 1989	list^{[A]}
10322 Mayuminarita	11 November 1990	list^{[A]}
10326 Kuragano	21 November 1990	list^{[A]}
10351 Seiichisato	23 September 1992	list^{[A]}

10352 Kawamura	26 October 1992	list^{[A]}
10355 Kojiroharada	15 March 1993	list^{[A]}
10366 Shozosato	24 November 1994	list^{[A]}
10546 Nakanomakoto	28 March 1992	list^{[A]}
10555 Tagaharue	16 April 1993	list^{[A]}
10559 Yukihisa	16 September 1993	list^{[A]}
10560 Michinari	8 October 1993	list^{[A]}
10561 Shimizumasahiro	15 October 1993	list^{[A]}
10569 Kinoshitamasao	8 April 1994	list^{[A]}
10570 Shibayasuo	8 April 1994	list^{[A]}
10608 Mameta	7 November 1996	list^{[A]}
10616 Inouetakeshi	25 October 1997	list^{[A]}
10760 Ozeki	15 October 1990	list^{[A]}
10767 Toyomasu	22 October 1990	list^{[A]}
10802 Masamifuruya	28 October 1992	list^{[A]}
10805 Iwano	18 November 1992	list^{[A]}
10821 Kimuratakeshi	16 September 1993	list^{[A]}
10822 Yasunori	16 September 1993	list^{[A]}
10823 Sakaguchi	16 September 1993	list^{[A]}
10827 Doikazunori	11 October 1993	list^{[A]}
(10873) 1996 TF_{11}	11 October 1996	list
10882 Shinonaga	3 November 1996	list^{[A]}
10884 Tsuboimasaki	7 November 1996	list^{[A]}
10885 Horimasato	7 November 1996	list^{[A]}
11072 Hiraoka	3 April 1992	list^{[A]}

11074 Kuniwake	23 September 1992	list^{[A]}
11079 Mitsunori	13 January 1993	list^{[A]}
11086 Nagatayuji	11 October 1993	list^{[A]}
11087 Yamasakimakoto	15 October 1993	list^{[A]}
11099 Sonodamasaki	20 April 1995	list^{[A]}
11282 Hanakusa	30 October 1989	list^{[A]}
11316 Fuchitatsuo	5 October 1994	list^{[A]}
11323 Nasu	21 August 1995	list^{[A]}
11324 Hayamizu	30 August 1995	list^{[A]}
11492 Shimose	13 November 1988	list^{[A]}
11495 Fukunaga	3 December 1988	list^{[A]}
11545 Hashimoto	26 October 1992	list^{[A]}
11579 Tsujitsuka	6 May 1994	list^{[A]}
11593 Uchikawa	20 April 1995	list^{[A]}
11615 Naoya	13 January 1996	list^{[A]}
11664 Kashiwagi	4 April 1997	list^{[A]}
11860 Uedasatoshi	16 October 1988	list^{[A]}
11915 Nishiinoue	23 September 1992	list^{[A]}
11921 Mitamasahiro	26 October 1992	list^{[A]}
11928 Akimotohiro	23 January 1993	list^{[A]}
11929 Uchino	23 January 1993	list^{[A]}
11933 Himuka	15 March 1993	list^{[A]}
11949 Kagayayutaka	19 September 1993	list^{[A]}
11959 Okunokeno	13 April 1994	list^{[A]}
11978 Makotomasako	20 September 1995	list^{[A]}

11987 Yonematsu	15 November 1995	list^{[A]}
12012 Kitahiroshima	7 November 1996	list^{[A]}
12013 Sibatahosimi	7 November 1996	list^{[A]}
12047 Hideomitani	3 April 1997	list^{[A]}
12262 Nishio	21 October 1989	list^{[A]}
12278 Kisohinoki	21 November 1990	list^{[A]}
12326 Shirasaki	21 September 1992	list^{[A]}
12357 Toyako	16 September 1993	list^{[A]}
12362 Mumuryk	15 October 1993	list^{[A]}
12383 Eboshi	2 October 1994	list^{[A]}
12387 Tomokofujiwara	28 October 1994	list^{[A]}
12388 Kikunokai	1 November 1994	list^{[A]}
12391 Ecoadachi	26 November 1994	list^{[A]}
12411 Tannokayo	20 September 1995	list^{[A]}
12412 Muchisachie	20 September 1995	list^{[A]}
12415 Wakatatakayo	22 September 1995	list^{[A]}
12435 Sudachi	17 January 1996	list^{[A]}
12440 Koshigayaboshi	11 February 1996	list^{[A]}
12751 Kamihayashi	15 March 1993	list^{[A]}
12769 Kandakurenai	18 March 1994	list^{[A]}
12771 Kimshin	5 April 1994	list^{[A]}
12787 Abetadashi	20 September 1995	list^{[A]}
12810 Okumiomote	17 January 1996	list^{[A]}
13039 Awashima	27 March 1990	list^{[A]}
13094 Shinshuueda	19 October 1992	list^{[A]}

13140 Shinchukai	4 November 1994	list^{[A]}
13156 Mannoucyo	20 September 1995	list^{[A]}
13163 Koyamachuya	28 October 1995	list^{[A]}
13198 Banpeiyu	27 February 1997	list^{[A]}
13565 Yotakanashi	28 October 1992	list^{[A]}
13567 Urabe	16 November 1992	list^{[A]}
13576 Gotoyoshi	16 April 1993	list^{[A]}
13577 Ukawa	16 April 1993	list^{[A]}
13582 Tominari	15 October 1993	list^{[A]}
13605 Nakamuraminoru	1 September 1994	list^{[A]}
13608 Andosatoru	2 October 1994	list^{[A]}
13627 Yukitamayo	15 November 1995	list^{[A]}
13640 Ohtateruaki	12 April 1996	list^{[A]}
13942 Shiratakihime	2 November 1989	list^{[A]}
14004 Chikama	19 September 1993	list^{[A]}
14006 Sakamotofumio	18 September 1993	list^{[A]}
14010 Jomonaomori	16 October 1993	list^{[A]}
14027 Ichimoto	2 October 1994	list^{[A]}
14028 Nakamurahiroshi	5 October 1994	list^{[A]}
14031 Rozyo	26 November 1994	list^{[A]}
14047 Kohichiro	18 November 1995	list^{[A]}
14105 Nakadai	6 October 1997	list^{[A]}
14401 Reikoyukawa	15 December 1990	list^{[A]}
14426 Katotsuyoshi	29 October 1991	list^{[A]}
14436 Morishita	23 March 1992	list^{[A]}

(14445) 1992 UZ_{3}	26 October 1992	list^{[A]}
14447 Hosakakanai	2 November 1992	list^{[A]}
14449 Myogizinzya	16 November 1992	list^{[A]}
14469 Komatsuataka	12 September 1993	list^{[A]}
14487 Sakaisakae	2 October 1994	list^{[A]}
14491 Hitachiomiya	4 November 1994	list^{[A]}
14492 Bistar	4 November 1994	list^{[A]}
14499 Satotoshio	15 November 1995	list^{[A]}
14555 Shinohara	1 November 1997	list^{[A]}
14850 Nagashimacho	29 August 1989	list^{[A]}
14853 Shimokawa	30 September 1989	list^{[A]}
14888 Kanazawashi	30 September 1991	list^{[A]}
14911 Fukamatsu	15 September 1993	list^{[A]}
14922 Ohyama	2 October 1994	list^{[A]}
14925 Naoko	4 November 1994	list^{[A]}
14926 Hoshide	4 November 1994	list^{[A]}
14927 Satoshi	1 November 1994	list^{[A]}
14981 Uenoiwakura	6 October 1997	list^{[A]}
14998 Ogosemachi	1 November 1997	list^{[A]}
15246 Kumeta	2 November 1989	list^{[A]}
15248 Hidekazu	29 November 1989	list^{[A]}
15250 Nishiyamahiro	28 February 1990	list^{[A]}
15303 Hatoyamamachi	19 October 1992	list^{[A]}
15316 Okagakimachi	20 April 1993	list^{[A]}
15330 de Almeida	8 October 1993	list^{[A]}

15351 Yamaguchimamoru	4 November 1994	list^{[A]}
15736 Hamanasu	8 December 1990	list^{[A]}
15740 Hyakumangoku	15 March 1991	list^{[A]}
15763 Nagakubo	26 October 1992	list^{[A]}
15786 Hoshioka	15 September 1993	list^{[A]}
15791 Yoshiewatanabe	15 October 1993	list^{[A]}
15805 Murakamitakehiko	8 April 1994	list^{[A]}
15806 Kohei	15 April 1994	list^{[A]}
15821 Iijimatatsushi	2 October 1994	list^{[A]}
15843 Comcom	20 September 1995	list^{[A]}
15856 Yanokoji	10 March 1996	list^{[A]}
15857 Touji	10 March 1996	list^{[A]}
15910 Shinkamigoto	6 October 1997	list^{[A]}
15922 Masajisaito	1 November 1997	list^{[A]}
16463 Nayoro	2 March 1990	list^{[A]}
16466 Piyashiriyama	29 March 1990	list^{[A]}
16507 Fuuren	24 October 1990	list^{[A]}
16525 Shumarinaiko	14 February 1991	list^{[A]}
16528 Terakado	2 April 1991	list^{[A]}
16552 Sawamura	16 September 1991	list^{[A]}
16555 Nagaomasami	31 October 1991	list^{[A]}
16587 Nagamori	21 September 1992	list^{[A]}
16594 Sorachi	26 October 1992	list^{[A]}
16624 Hoshizawa	16 April 1993	list^{[A]}
16625 Kunitsugu	20 April 1993	list^{[A]}

16644 Otemaedaigaku	16 September 1993	list^{[A]}
(16649) 1993 TY_{1}	15 October 1993	list^{[A]}
16650 Sakushingakuin	11 October 1993	list^{[A]}
16671 Tago	13 January 1994	list^{[A]}
16675 Torii	8 February 1994	list^{[A]}
16680 Minamitanemachi	14 March 1994	list^{[A]}
16713 Airashi	20 September 1995	list^{[A]}
16718 Morikawa	30 October 1995	list^{[A]}
16719 Mizokami	28 October 1995	list^{[A]}
17462 Takahisa	22 October 1990	list^{[A]}
17470 Mitsuhashi	19 January 1991	list^{[A]}
17501 Tetsuro	23 March 1992	list^{[A]}
17502 Manabeseiji	23 March 1992	list^{[A]}
17520 Hisayukiyoshio	23 January 1993	list^{[A]}
17544 Kojiroishikawa	15 September 1993	list^{[A]}
17546 Osadakentaro	19 September 1993	list^{[A]}
17567 Hoshinoyakata	5 April 1994	list^{[A]}
17603 Qoyllurwasi	20 September 1995	list^{[A]}
17615 Takeomasaru	30 October 1995	list^{[A]}
17617 Takimotoikuo	28 October 1995	list^{[A]}
18399 Tentoumushi	17 November 1992	list^{[A]}
18403 Atsuhirotaisei	13 January 1993	list^{[A]}
18404 Kenichi	20 March 1993	list^{[A]}
18418 Ujibe	15 October 1993	list^{[A]}
18453 Nishiyamayukio	2 October 1994	list^{[A]}

18467 Nagatatsu	22 September 1995	list^{[A]}
18472 Hatada	12 November 1995	list^{[A]}
18473 Kikuchijun	15 November 1995	list^{[A]}
18524 Tagatoshihiro	6 November 1996	list^{[A]}
(19135) 1988 XQ	3 December 1988	list^{[A]}
19159 Taenakano	10 October 1990	list^{[A]}
19160 Chikayoshitomi	15 October 1990	list^{[A]}
19165 Nariyuki	4 February 1991	list^{[A]}
19228 Uemuraikuo	16 September 1993	list^{[A]}
19230 Sugazi	11 October 1993	list^{[A]}
19288 Egami	20 March 1996	list^{[A]}
19303 Chinacyo	5 October 1996	list^{[A]}
(19304) 1996 TQ_{1}	5 October 1996	list^{[A]}
19307 Hanayama	14 October 1996	list^{[A]}
19313 Shibatakazunari	6 November 1996	list^{[A]}
19314 Nakamuratetsu	7 November 1996	list^{[A]}
(19315) 1996 VY_{8}	7 November 1996	list^{[A]}
20038 Arasaki	26 October 1992	list^{[A]}
20080 Maeharatorakichi	7 March 1994	list^{[A]}
20096 Shiraishiakihiko	2 October 1994	list^{[A]}
20098 Shibatagenji	24 November 1994	list^{[A]}
20117 Tannoakira	15 November 1995	list^{[A]}
21033 Akahirakiyozo	21 October 1989	list^{[A]}
21035 Iwabu	1 January 1990	list^{[A]}
21117 Tashimaseizo	30 September 1992	list^{[A]}

(21120) 1992 WP	16 November 1992	list^{[A]}
21121 Andoshoeki	16 November 1992	list^{[A]}
21161 Yamashitaharuo	15 October 1993	list^{[A]}
(21182) 1994 EC_{2}	12 March 1994	list^{[A]}
(21187) 1994 FY	31 March 1994	list^{[A]}
21188 Kiyohiro	5 April 1994	list^{[A]}
21237 Suematsu	18 November 1995	list^{[A]}
(21280) 1996 TL_{11}	11 October 1996	list
21292 Kanetakoichi	7 November 1996	list^{[A]}
21293 Fujimototoyoshi	7 November 1996	list^{[A]}
21294 Yamaguchiyuko	7 November 1996	list^{[A]}
22347 Mishinatakashi	30 September 1992	list^{[A]}
22351 Yamashitatoshiki	19 October 1992	list^{[A]}
22352 Fujiwarakenjiro	26 October 1992	list^{[A]}
22355 Yahabananshozan	16 November 1992	list^{[A]}
22394 Kondouakira	2 October 1994	list^{[A]}
22395 Ourakenji	2 October 1994	list^{[A]}
(22397) 1994 VV_{2}	4 November 1994	list^{[A]}
22409 Nagatohideaki	20 September 1995	list^{[A]}
22416 Tanimotoyoshi	28 October 1995	list^{[A]}
(22443) 1996 TJ_{11}	11 October 1996	list
22453 Shibusawaeiichi	7 November 1996	list^{[A]}
22480 Maedatoshihisa	3 April 1997	list^{[A]}
23471 Kawatamasaaki	15 October 1990	list^{[A]}
23475 Nakazawa	13 November 1990	list^{[A]}

23524 Yuichitsuda	23 January 1993	list^{[A]}
23543 Saiki	16 October 1993	list^{[A]}
23562 Hyodokenichi	2 October 1994	list^{[A]}
(23662) 1997 ES_{17}	3 March 1997	list^{[A]}
(23676) 1997 GR_{25}	4 April 1997	list^{[A]}
(24673) 1989 SB_{1}	28 September 1989	list^{[A]}
(24753) 1992 UU_{5}	28 October 1992	list^{[A]}
(24808) 1994 TN_{1}	2 October 1994	list^{[A]}
(24816) 1994 VU_{6}	1 November 1994	list^{[A]}
(24825) 1995 QB_{2}	21 August 1995	list^{[A]}
(24830) 1995 ST_{3}	20 September 1995	list^{[A]}
(24841) 1995 UY_{8}	30 October 1995	list^{[A]}
(24844) 1995 VM_{1}	15 November 1995	list^{[A]}
24911 Kojimashigemi	27 February 1997	list^{[A]}
24919 Teruyoshi	3 March 1997	list^{[A]}
(24960) 1997 TV_{17}	6 October 1997	list^{[A]}
(26104) 1990 VV_{1}	11 November 1990	list^{[A]}
(26171) 1996 BY_{2}	17 January 1996	list^{[A]}
(26213) 1997 UV_{8}	25 October 1997	list^{[A]}
(26828) 1989 WZ_{1}	29 November 1989	list^{[A]}
(26852) 1992 UK_{2}	19 October 1992	list^{[A]}
(26855) 1992 WN_{1}	17 November 1992	list^{[A]}
(26886) 1994 TJ_{2}	2 October 1994	list^{[A]}
27749 Tsukadaken	23 January 1991	list^{[A]}
(27787) 1992 UO_{6}	28 October 1992	list^{[A]}

(27809) 1993 HS_{1}	20 April 1993	list^{[A]}
(27815) 1993 SA_{1}	16 September 1993	list^{[A]}
27816 Naitohiroyuki	15 October 1993	list^{[A]}
27844 Fumitake	2 October 1994	list^{[A]}
27861 Sudachikako	28 January 1995	list^{[A]}
27882 Ootanihideji	10 March 1996	list^{[A]}
27887 Kiyoharu	12 April 1996	list^{[A]}
(27920) 1996 VV_{8}	7 November 1996	list^{[A]}
(29167) 1989 WC_{2}	29 November 1989	list^{[A]}
(29251) 1992 UH_{4}	26 October 1992	list^{[A]}
(29299) 1993 TW_{1}	15 October 1993	list^{[A]}
29374 Kazumitsu	13 April 1996	list^{[A]}
(29408) 1996 VJ_{5}	3 November 1996	list^{[A]}
(29474) 1997 UT_{8}	25 October 1997	list^{[A]}
(30805) 1989 UO_{2}	21 October 1989	list^{[A]}
(30886) 1992 WJ_{1}	17 November 1992	list^{[A]}
(30924) 1993 RC_{2}	15 September 1993	list^{[A]}
(30925) 1993 RD_{2}	15 September 1993	list^{[A]}
(30943) 1994 ED_{2}	12 March 1994	list^{[A]}
(30944) 1994 GD_{1}	8 April 1994	list^{[A]}
(31063) 1996 TK_{11}	11 October 1996	list
(32815) 1991 GK_{1}	14 April 1991	list^{[A]}
(32854) 1992 SC_{13}	30 September 1992	list^{[A]}
(32909) 1994 TS	2 October 1994	list^{[A]}
(32919) 1995 CJ_{1}	3 February 1995	list^{[A]}

(32973) 1996 TN_{11}	11 October 1996	list
(33008) 1997 EU_{17}	3 March 1997	list^{[A]}
(33059) 1997 VS	1 November 1997	list^{[A]}
(35141) 1992 SH_{1}	23 September 1992	list^{[A]}
(35169) 1993 SP_{2}	19 September 1993	list^{[A]}
(35170) 1993 TM	8 October 1993	list^{[A]}
(35171) 1993 TF_{1}	15 October 1993	list^{[A]}
(35172) 1993 TA_{3}	11 October 1993	list^{[A]}
(35231) 1995 GH_{7}	4 April 1995	list^{[A]}
(35298) 1996 VH_{5}	3 November 1996	list^{[A]}
(35299) 1996 VK_{8}	7 November 1996	list^{[A]}
(35343) 1997 GV_{36}	3 April 1997	list^{[A]}
(37625) 1993 SR_{1}	16 September 1993	list^{[A]}
(37626) 1993 SG_{2}	19 September 1993	list^{[A]}
(37669) 1994 TH_{1}	2 October 1994	list^{[A]}
(37693) 1995 VQ_{1}	15 November 1995	list^{[A]}
(37764) 1997 GT_{3}	2 April 1997	list^{[A]}
(39703) 1996 TD_{13}	14 October 1996	list^{[A]}
39723 Akazawa	7 November 1996	list^{[A]}
42527 Mizutanimasanori	2 October 1994	list^{[A]}
(43851) 1993 TL_{1}	15 October 1993	list^{[A]}
(43870) 1994 TX	2 October 1994	list^{[A]}
43899 Kobayashihiroki	15 November 1995	list^{[A]}
43926 Takanoatsushi	10 March 1996	list^{[A]}
(43936) 1996 TM_{11}	11 October 1996	list

46588 Murakamimasayuki	16 November 1992	list^{[A]}
46589 Fukusako	16 November 1992	list^{[A]}
(46590) 1992 WP_{1}	17 November 1992	list^{[A]}
(46608) 1993 RA_{2}	12 September 1993	list^{[A]}
(46609) 1993 SQ_{1}	16 September 1993	list^{[A]}
46610 Bésixdouze	15 October 1993	list^{[A]}
(46631) 1994 TQ_{3}	5 October 1994	list^{[A]}
(46634) 1994 VR_{2}	1 November 1994	list^{[A]}
(46649) 1995 SN_{4}	20 September 1995	list^{[A]}
(48448) 1990 WR_{2}	21 November 1990	list^{[A]}
(48590) 1994 TY_{2}	2 October 1994	list^{[A]}
(48591) 1994 TB_{3}	2 October 1994	list^{[A]}
(48635) 1995 SU_{52}	20 September 1995	list^{[A]}
(48680) 1996 BU	17 January 1996	list^{[A]}
(48686) 1996 EM_{1}	10 March 1996	list^{[A]}
(48739) 1997 EV_{17}	3 March 1997	list^{[A]}
(48748) 1997 GV_{3}	3 April 1997	list^{[A]}
(48802) 1997 UU_{8}	25 October 1997	list^{[A]}
(52345) 1993 FG_{1}	20 March 1993	list^{[A]}
(52382) 1993 HE_{1}	16 April 1993	list^{[A]}
(52402) 1993 TL	8 October 1993	list^{[A]}
(52443) 1994 TW	2 October 1994	list^{[A]}
(52444) 1994 TQ_{2}	2 October 1994	list^{[A]}
(55791) 1993 SA_{2}	19 September 1993	list^{[A]}
(58181) 1991 CG_{1}	7 February 1991	list^{[A]}

(58261) 1993 SD_{1}	16 September 1993	list^{[A]}
(58262) 1993 ST_{2}	19 September 1993	list^{[A]}
(58374) 1995 SF_{5}	20 September 1995	list^{[A]}
(58485) 1996 TH_{13}	14 October 1996	list^{[A]}
(58540) 1997 ET_{17}	3 March 1997	list^{[A]}
(58541) 1997 EA_{18}	3 March 1997	list^{[A]}
(58625) 1997 VE_{2}	1 November 1997	list^{[A]}
(65776) 1995 SW_{3}	20 September 1995	list^{[A]}
(65786) 1995 UV_{8}	28 October 1995	list^{[A]}
(65791) 1995 UE_{45}	28 October 1995	list^{[A]}
(69270) 1989 BB	29 January 1989	list^{[A]}
(69371) 1994 TA_{1}	2 October 1994	list^{[A]}
(69453) 1996 TG_{11}	11 October 1996	list
(73781) 1994 TW_{2}	2 October 1994	list^{[A]}
(73807) 1995 SZ_{29}	22 September 1995	list^{[A]}
(79249) 1994 TL	2 October 1994	list^{[A]}
(85178) 1990 TQ	10 October 1990	list^{[A]}
(85295) 1994 TY	2 October 1994	list^{[A]}
(90935) 1997 TW_{17}	6 October 1997	list^{[A]}
(96221) 1993 TC_{2}	15 October 1993	list^{[A]}
(100083) 1992 SA_{13}	30 September 1992	list^{[A]}
(100139) 1993 TS	11 October 1993	list^{[A]}
(100272) 1994 VX_{6}	1 November 1994	list^{[A]}
(100557) 1997 GW_{3}	3 April 1997	list^{[A]}
(100637) 1997 VF_{2}	1 November 1997	list^{[A]}

(100644) 1997 VV_{6}	1 November 1997	list^{[A]}
117568 Yadame	5 March 2005	list
(120506) 1993 TO_{1}	15 October 1993	list^{[A]}
145062 Hashikami	4 April 2005	list
(147919) 2006 UZ_{217}	30 October 2006	list
(159228) 2005 XD_{5}	1 December 2005	list
(162072) 1997 TT_{17}	6 October 1997	list^{[A]}
(175543) 2006 ST_{218}	29 September 2006	list
(178094) 2006 SS_{218}	29 September 2006	list
(178171) 2006 UH_{64}	23 October 2006	list
(187532) 2006 UX_{64}	23 October 2006	list
(187545) 2006 UA_{218}	30 October 2006	list
188576 Kosenda	5 March 2005	list
(199197) 2006 AX_{3}	5 January 2006	list
(202908) 1996 TH_{11}	11 October 1996	list
(216230) 2006 UG_{216}	29 October 2006	list
(218838) 2006 UW_{64}	23 October 2006	list
(230976) 2005 AG_{28}	10 January 2005	list
(246079) 2006 XD_{4}	14 December 2006	list
(251211) 2006 UU_{184}	24 October 2006	list
(256572) 2007 TE_{67}	6 October 2007	list
(256773) 2008 CP_{1}	2 February 2008	list
(260505) 2005 EX_{32}	5 March 2005	list
(272671) 2005 XQ	1 December 2005	list
(284575) 2007 TC_{71}	13 October 2007	list

(290869) 2005 WH_{56}	26 November 2005	list
(292779) 2006 UB_{215}	26 October 2006	list
(294298) 2007 VT_{4}	3 November 2007	list
(294740) 2008 CO_{1}	2 February 2008	list
(295834) 2008 VC_{1}	1 November 2008	list
(300058) 2006 US_{184}	23 October 2006	list
(309039) 2006 UL_{216}	29 October 2006	list
(314853) 2006 UH_{216}	29 October 2006	list
(319904) 2006 XC_{4}	14 December 2006	list
(320429) 2007 VN_{91}	5 November 2007	list
(348881) 2006 SR_{218}	29 September 2006	list
(351415) 2005 GR_{22}	4 April 2005	list
(358603) 2007 VP_{3}	2 November 2007	list
(361349) 2006 UW_{184}	24 October 2006	list
(364710) 2007 VU_{7}	3 November 2007	list
(364818) 2008 CN	1 February 2008	list
(383416) 2006 UC_{215}	26 October 2006	list
(397347) 2006 UQ_{63}	17 October 2006	list
(400068) 2006 SV_{130}	23 September 2006	list
(409935) 2006 UJ_{64}	23 October 2006	list
(423283) 2005 AH_{28}	10 January 2005	list
(438393) 2006 UK_{64}	23 October 2006	list
(456368) 2006 US_{1}	16 October 2006	list
(509917) 2009 HA	16 April 2009	list
(602752) 2014 QA_{38}	30 November 2007	list

(626002) 2006 UJ_{216}	29 October 2006	list
(850636) 2007 HD_{4}	18 April 2007	list
Co-discovery made with:^{A} K. Watanabe

== See also ==
- List of minor planet discoverers § K. Endate
