= Takuboku =

Takuboku may refer to:

- Takuboku (啄木), Japanese word for "woodpecker"
- Takuboku Ishikawa (1886–1912), Japanese poet, known as just Takuboku
- 4672 Takuboku (1988 HB), a main-belt asteroid, named after the poet
