= 11949 Kagayayutaka =

Asteroid named after Japanese artist Kagaya Yutaka

Discovery
- Discovered by: K. Endate; K. Watanabe
- Discovery site: Kitami Obs.
- Discovery date: 19 September 1993

Designations
- Named after: Kagaya Yutaka (artist)
- Alternative designations: 1993 SD_{2} · 1998 QV_{62}
- Minor planet category: main-belt · (outer) background

Orbital characteristics
- Epoch 4 September 2017 (JD 2458000.5)
- Uncertainty parameter 0
- Observation arc: 23.70 yr (8,658 days)
- Aphelion: 3.6359 AU
- Perihelion: 2.5444 AU
- Semi-major axis: 3.0902 AU
- Eccentricity: 0.1766
- Orbital period (sidereal): 5.43 yr (1,984 days)
- Mean anomaly: 50.480°
- Mean motion: 0° 10^{m} 53.04^{s} / day
- Inclination: 7.6260°
- Longitude of ascending node: 226.00°
- Argument of perihelion: 249.52°

Physical characteristics
- Mean diameter: 22.28±6.88 km 23.21 km (calculated)
- Synodic rotation period: 3.96±0.03 h
- Geometric albedo: 0.057 (assumed); 0.708
- Spectral type: S · C
- Absolute magnitude (H): 11.80 · 11.9 · 11.91±0.58

11949 Kagayayutaka, provisional designation 1993 SD_{2}, is a stony background asteroid from the outer region of the asteroid belt, approximately 23 kilometers (14 miles) in diameter. It was discovered on 19 September 1993, by Japanese amateur astronomers Kin Endate and Kazuro Watanabe at Kitami Observatory in eastern Hokkaidō, Japan. The asteroid was named after Japanese artist Kagaya Yutaka.

== Orbit and classification ==
Kagayayutaka is a non-family asteroid from the main belt's background population. It orbits the Sun in the outer main-belt at a distance of 2.5–3.6 AU once every 5 years and 5 months (1,984 days). Its orbit has an eccentricity of 0.18 and an inclination of 8° with respect to the ecliptic. The body's observation arc starts with its official discovery observation.

== Naming ==
This minor planet was named after Kagaya Yutaka (born 1968), a Japanese space and digital artist and receiver of the Gold Medal in the American Digital Art Contest in 2000. The approved naming citation was published by the Minor Planet Center on 10 September 2003 (M.P.C. 49674).

== Physical characteristics ==
Kagayayutaka has been characterized as a stony S-type asteroid by Pan-STARRS photometric survey.

=== Diameter and albedo ===
According to the survey carried out by NASA's Wide-field Infrared Survey Explorer with its subsequent NEOWISE mission, Kagayayutaka measures 22.28 kilometers in diameter and its surface has a high albedo of 0.708, while the Collaborative Asteroid Lightcurve Link assumes a standard albedo for carbonaceous asteroids of 0.057 and calculates a diameter of 23.21 kilometers with an absolute magnitude of 11.9.

=== Lightcurves ===
A rotational lightcurve of Kagayayutaka was obtained from photometric observations by French astronomer René Roy in November 2015. Lightcurve analysis gave a rotation period of 3.96 hours with a brightness variation of 0.28 magnitude (U=3-).
