= Kagaya Yutaka =

Japanese digital artist (born 1968)

The Great Digital Artist Kagaya Yutaka
- 加賀屋豊
- Born: Kagaya Yutaka; 5 April 1968 (age 58); Saitama
- Known for: Art
- Notable work: Digital Art
- Website: Kagayastudio.com

Kagaya Yutaka (かがやゆたか; born 1968 in Saitama) is a Japanese digital artist, illustrator and photographer who is known for painting elaborately detailed and spectacularly colored images of space and utopian worlds.

== Biography ==
Kagaya Yutaka born in Saitama, north of Tokyo(Japan). He studied and graduated from the Tokyo Designer Gakuin College. He then became an illustrator for the astronomy magazine Hoshi Navi.

The International Astronomical Union named the asteroid number 11949 after Kagaya Yutaka in 2003.

== Style ==
His images often include elements with a luminous quality. Some of his favorite subjects are astronomy and visions of utopian worlds.

His most famous works focus on three main topics: Celestial Exploring, Galactic Railroad and Starry Tales. Kagaya really likes the night sky with stars and he often uses the blue color in his work.

== Filmography ==
- Fantasy Railroad in the Stars (銀河鉄道の夜) with Kenji Miyazawa (DVD, 2007). The DVD features the story of a boy dreaming of travelling by train through the Milky Way, and the story is narrated by the voice actress Kuwashima Houko.

== Bibliography ==
- The Encyclopedia of the Four Seasons

== External sources ==
- Official website
