= 5176 Yoichi =

Asteroid

Discovery
- Discovered by: S. Ueda; H. Kaneda
- Discovery site: Kushiro Obs.
- Discovery date: 4 January 1989

Designations
- Named after: Yoichi (Japanese town)
- Alternative designations: 1989 AU · 1935 YH; 1948 VS · 1948 WS; 1952 OH_{1} · 1961 TK_{1}
- Minor planet category: main-belt · (middle) background

Orbital characteristics
- Epoch 23 March 2018 (JD 2458200.5)
- Uncertainty parameter 0
- Observation arc: 81.52 yr (29,777 d)
- Aphelion: 3.5198 AU
- Perihelion: 1.8546 AU
- Semi-major axis: 2.6872 AU
- Eccentricity: 0.3098
- Orbital period (sidereal): 4.41 yr (1,609 d)
- Mean anomaly: 295.85°
- Mean motion: 0° 13^{m} 25.32^{s} / day
- Inclination: 7.7043°
- Longitude of ascending node: 93.615°
- Argument of perihelion: 269.81°

Physical characteristics
- Mean diameter: 15.68±1.57 km 16.54 km (derived); 16.56±0.7 km 16.74±4.79 km 18.92±5.20 km 19.49±1.15 km
- Geometric albedo: 0.05±0.03; 0.054±0.048; 0.06±0.03; 0.061±0.008; 0.0777 (derived); 0.0849±0.007
- Spectral type: S (assumed)
- Absolute magnitude (H): 12.20; 12.3; 12.36±0.26; 12.40; 12.57

5176 Yoichi (provisional designation 1989 AU) is a background asteroid from the central regions of the asteroid belt, approximately 17 kilometers (11 miles) in diameter. It was discovered on 4 January 1989 by Japanese astronomers Seiji Ueda and Hiroshi Kaneda at the Kushiro Observatory on Hokkaido, Japan. The likely elongated asteroid has a brightness variation of 0.45 magnitude and occulted a star in the constellation Cetus in November 2014. It was named for the Japanese town of Yoichi.

== Orbit and classification ==
Yoichi is a non-family asteroid from the main belt's background population. It orbits the Sun in the central main-belt at a distance of 1.9–3.5 AU once every 4 years and 5 months (1,609 days; semi-major axis of 2.69 AU). Its orbit has an eccentricity of 0.31 and an inclination of 8° concerning the ecliptic.

The body's observation arc begins with its first observations as 1935 YH at Johannesburg Observatory in December 1935, or 53 years before its official discovery observation at Kushiro.

== Physical characteristics ==
Yoichi is an assumed S-type asteroid, while the body's albedo indicates a carbonaceous C-type asteroid (see below).

=== Rotation period ===
In November 2015, astronomers took photometric data of Yoichi at the Oakley Southern Sky Observatory in Australia. However, no rotational lightcurve could be constructed. The asteroid's brightness amplitude was 0.42 magnitude (U=n.a.), indicative of an elongated shape. As of 2018, the body's rotation period, pole, and shape remain unknown.

=== Diameter and albedo ===
According to the surveys carried out by the Infrared Astronomical Satellite IRAS, the Japanese Akari satellite, and the NEOWISE mission of NASA's Wide-field Infrared Survey Explorer, Yoichi measures between 15.68 and 19.49 kilometers in diameter, and its surface has an albedo between 0.05 and 0.0849.

The Collaborative Asteroid Lightcurve Link derives an albedo of 0.0777 and a diameter of 16.54 kilometers based on an absolute magnitude of 12.3.

=== Occultation ===
On 2 November 2014, Yoichi occulted an 8.4 magnitude star HIP 14421 in the constellation Cetus, causing a magnitude drop from 8.4 to 14.1 during 2.8 seconds. The occultation was visible over Southern Japan, Eastern China, and Southern California to North Florida. The asteroid's 23-kilometer-wide shadow had a speed of approximately 6.8 km/s. An approximate diameter of 20 kilometers was assumed for the asteroid.

== Naming ==
This minor planet was named after the Japanese town of Yoichi, Hokkaido, where the Kushiro Observatory was discovered. The Minor Planet Center published the official naming citation on 4 August 2001 (M.P.C. 43189).
