= (5407) 1992 AX =

Mars-crossing asteroid binary

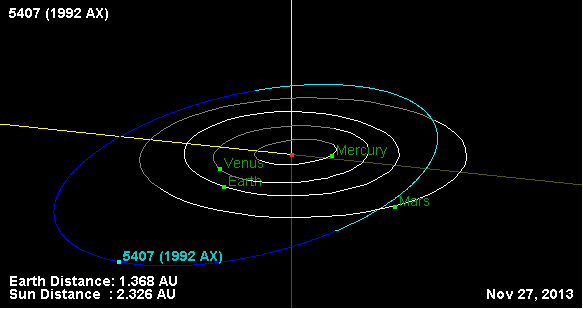
- Orbital diagram of 1992 AX

Discovery
- Discovered by: S. Ueda; H. Kaneda
- Discovery site: Kushiro Obs.
- Discovery date: 4 January 1992

Designations
- Alternative designations: 1987 BH_{2}
- Minor planet category: Mars crosser binary

Orbital characteristics
- Epoch 27 April 2019 (JD 2458600.5)
- Uncertainty parameter 0
- Observation arc: 66.90 yr (24,434 d)
- Aphelion: 2.3486 AU
- Perihelion: 1.3279 AU
- Semi-major axis: 1.8383 AU
- Eccentricity: 0.2776
- Orbital period (sidereal): 2.49 yr (910 d)
- Mean anomaly: 263.87°
- Mean motion: 0° 23^{m} 43.8^{s} / day
- Inclination: 11.390°
- Longitude of ascending node: 117.74°
- Argument of perihelion: 108.78°
- Known satellites: 1 (D: 780 m; P: 13.52 h)
- Earth MOID: 0.377 AU (147 LD)

Physical characteristics
- Mean diameter: 2.78±0.55 km 3.60±0.36 km 3.8±0.4 km 4.18±0.12 km
- Synodic rotation period: 2.5488 h
- Geometric albedo: 0.199; 0.294; 0.376; 0.40
- Spectral type: SMASS = Sk · S B–V = 0.690; V–R = 0.500; V–I = 0.840
- Absolute magnitude (H): 13.90; 14.0; 14.47

(5407) 1992 AX is a stony asteroid and a synchronous binary Mars-crosser from the innermost region of the asteroid belt, approximately 3.6 kilometers (2.2 miles) in diameter. It was discovered on 4 January 1992, by Japanese astronomers Seiji Ueda and Hiroshi Kaneda at the Kushiro Observatory on Hokkaidō, Japan. The S-type asteroid has a short rotation period of 2.5 hours. Its sub-kilometer satellite was discovered in 1997. As of 2018, the binary system has not been named.

== Orbit and classification ==
1992 AX is a member of the Mars-crossing asteroids, a dynamically unstable group between the main belt and the near-Earth populations, crossing the orbit of Mars at 1.66 AU. It orbits the Sun at a distance of 1.3–2.3 AU once every 2 years and 6 months (910 days; semi-major axis of 1.84 AU). Its orbit has an eccentricity of 0.28 and an inclination of 11° with respect to the ecliptic.

The asteroid makes occasional close approaches to Mars. Its next close approach, on 22 January 2027, will bring it 11,260,000 km (0.0753 AU) from Mars. The body's observation arc begins with a precovery taken at Palomar Observatory in November 1951, or more than 40 years prior to its official discovery observation at Kushiro.

== Naming ==
This minor planet was numbered by the Minor Planet Center on 9 December 1992 (M.P.C. 21249). As of 2018, it has not been named.

== Physical characteristics ==
1992 AX has been characterized as a common, stony S-type asteroid. In the SMASS taxonomy, it is an Sk-subtype, that transitions between the S and K-type asteroids. The body's color indices of 0.690 (B–V), 0.500 (V–R) and 0.840 (V–I) were also determined.

=== Lightcurves ===
==== Rotation period ====
Since 1997, several rotational lightcurves of 1992 AX have been obtained from photometric observations by Petr Pravec and collaborating astronomers. Best-rated lightcurve analysis gave a rotation period of 2.5488 hours with a consolidated brightness amplitude between 0.10 and 0.12 magnitude (U=2/3). The results supersedes a tentative period determination of 3.6 hours by Marc Buie (U=1).

==== Satellite ====
During the observations in January 1997, it was also revealed that 1992 AX is a synchronous binary asteroid with a minor-planet moon in its orbit. The satellite measures approximately 780 meters in diameter, or about 20% of its primary, and has an orbital period of 13.52 hours with an estimated semi-major axis of 5.8 kilometers for its very circular orbit. Observations by Pravec in January and February 2012 confirmed the binary nature of this asteroid, as well as its rotational and orbital periods.

=== Diameter and albedo ===
According to the surveys carried out by the Japanese Akari satellite, the Spitzer Space Telescope and the NEOWISE mission of NASA's Wide-field Infrared Survey Explorer (WISE), 1992 AX measures between 2.78 and 4.18 kilometers in diameter and its surface has an albedo between 0.199 and 0.40.

In 2017, a study by WISE dedicated to Mars-crossing asteroids determined a diameter of 3.60 kilometers with a high albedo of 0.376. The Collaborative Asteroid Lightcurve Link assumes an albedo of 0.20 and derives a diameter of 3.79 kilometers based on an absolute magnitude of 14.47. The Johnston's archive gives an effective (combined) diameter of 3.98 kilometers with 3.9 and 0.78 kilometers for its primary and secondary body, respectively.
