= (5646) 1990 TR =

Probable rare-type binary asteroid

Discovery
- Discovered by: S. Ueda; H. Kaneda
- Discovery site: Kushiro Obs.
- Discovery date: 11 October 1990

Designations
- Minor planet category: Amor · NEO

Orbital characteristics
- Epoch 4 September 2017 (JD 2458000.5)
- Uncertainty parameter 0
- Observation arc: 26.90 yr (9,825 days)
- Aphelion: 3.0791 AU
- Perihelion: 1.2087 AU
- Semi-major axis: 2.1439 AU
- Eccentricity: 0.4362
- Orbital period (sidereal): 3.14 yr (1,147 days)
- Mean anomaly: 218.56°
- Mean motion: 0° 18^{m} 50.4^{s} / day
- Inclination: 7.9118°
- Longitude of ascending node: 14.141°
- Argument of perihelion: 335.68°
- Known satellites: 1
- Earth MOID: 0.2112 AU · 82.3 LD

Physical characteristics
- Dimensions: 2.03±0.52 km 2.30 km (derived); 2.50±0.05 km 2.723±0.525 km 4.3 km (dated)
- Synodic rotation period: 3.1999±0.0002 h 3.204±0.002 h 6.25 h
- Geometric albedo: 0.18 (assumed); 0.19±0.03; 0.454±0.194; 0.65±0.43; 0.66±0.42
- Spectral type: SMASS = U Q · S · U
- Absolute magnitude (H): 14.3 · 15.00 · 15.4 · 15.45 · 15.67

(5646) 1990 TR is a probable rare-type binary asteroid classified as a near-Earth object of the Amor group, approximately 2.3 kilometers in diameter. It was discovered on 11 October 1990, by Japanese astronomers Seiji Ueda and Hiroshi Kaneda at Kushiro Observatory near Kushiro, in eastern Hokkaido, Japan.

== Orbit ==
The asteroid orbits the Sun at a distance of 1.2–3.1 AU once every 3 years and 2 months (1,147 days). Its orbit has an eccentricity of 0.44 and an inclination of 8° with respect to the ecliptic. The body's observation arc begins with its first observation at the Siding Spring Observatory, five months prior to its official discovery observation at Kushiro.

== Lightcurve ==
In December 2012, the so far best rated rotational lightcurve was obtained by American astronomer Brian Warner at his Palmer Divide Observatory in Colorado. Lightcurve analysis gave a rotation period of 3.1999 hours with a brightness variation of 0.12 magnitude (U=3). Photometric observations also gave a period of 19.47 hours for a probable asteroid moon, with a measured diameter-ratio of 0.18±0.02, which translates into a diameter of 400 meters for its moon.

== Diameter and albedo ==
According to the surveys carried out by the Spitzer Space Telescope and NASA's Wide-field Infrared Survey Explorer with its subsequent NEOWISE mission, the asteroid measures 2.03 and 2.723 kilometers in diameter and its surface has an albedo of 0.19 and 0.66. The Collaborative Asteroid Lightcurve Link assumes an albedo of 0.18 and derives a diameter of 2.3 kilometers based on an absolute magnitude of 15.67.
