= 4282 Endate =

Asteroid from the inner regions of the asteroid belt

Discovery
- Discovered by: S. Ueda; H. Kaneda
- Discovery site: Kushiro Obs. (399)
- Discovery date: 28 October 1987

Designations
- Named after: Kin Endate (amateur astronomer)
- Alternative designations: 1987 UQ_{1} · 1959 EJ; 1983 RT
- Minor planet category: main-belt · (inner)

Orbital characteristics
- Epoch 4 September 2017 (JD 2458000.5)
- Uncertainty parameter 0
- Observation arc: 61.89 yr (22,605 days)
- Aphelion: 2.7389 AU
- Perihelion: 2.0449 AU
- Semi-major axis: 2.3919 AU
- Eccentricity: 0.1451
- Orbital period (sidereal): 3.70 yr (1,351 days)
- Mean anomaly: 6.4722°
- Mean motion: 0° 15^{m} 59.04^{s} / day
- Inclination: 2.7202°
- Longitude of ascending node: 325.81°
- Argument of perihelion: 101.31°

Physical characteristics
- Dimensions: 5.66 km (calculated); 7.386±1.581 km 11.52±3.27 km 12.12±0.49 km 13.73±7.43 km
- Synodic rotation period: 34 h
- Geometric albedo: 0.038±0.050; 0.04±0.02; 0.058±0.005; 0.13±0.08; 0.20 (assumed)
- Spectral type: S
- Absolute magnitude (H): 13.30 · 13.48 · 13.50 · 13.6 · 13.93

4282 Endate, provisional designation 1987 UQ_{1}, is an asteroid from the inner regions of the asteroid belt, approximately 10 kilometers in diameter. It was discovered on 28 October 1987, by Japanese astronomers Seiji Ueda and Hiroshi Kaneda at Kushiro Observatory (399) in Japan. It was named for amateur astronomer Kin Endate.

== Orbit and classification ==
Endate is a presumed stony S-type asteroid. It orbits the Sun in the inner main-belt at a distance of 2.0–2.7 AU once every 3 years and 8 months (1,351 days). Its orbit has an eccentricity of 0.15 and an inclination of 3° with respect to the ecliptic. The first precovery was taken at Palomar Observatory in 1954, extending the body's observation arc by 33 years prior to its official discovery observation.

== Physical characteristics ==
=== Rotation period ===
In April 2014, a rotational lightcurve of Endate was obtained from photometric observations by Hungarian astronomer Gyula M. Szabó. Lightcurve analysis gave it a longer-than average rotation period of 34 hours with a brightness amplitude of 0.5 magnitude (U=n.a.). Most minor planets have a spin rate between 2 and 20 hours. Endate's rotation period is significantly longer but still much shorter than that of the so-called slow rotators, which take at least 100 hours to rotate once around their axis.

=== Diameter and albedo ===
According to the surveys carried out by the Japanese Akari satellite and NASA's Wide-field Infrared Survey Explorer with its subsequent NEOWISE mission, Endate measures between 7.386 and 13.73 kilometers in diameter and its surface has an albedo between 0.038 and 0.15. The Collaborative Asteroid Lightcurve Link assumes a standard albedo for stony asteroids of 0.20 and consequently calculates a smaller diameter of 5.66 kilometers.

== Naming ==
This minor planet was named in honor of Japanese amateur astronomer Kin Endate from Bihoro in northern Japan. He is a prolific observer and discoverer of minor planets. The official naming citation was published by the Minor Planet Center on 8 July 1990 (M.P.C. 16593).
