= 6235 Burney =

Florian or background asteroid

Discovery
- Discovered by: S. Ueda; H. Kaneda
- Discovery site: Kushiro Obs.
- Discovery date: 14 November 1987

Designations
- Named after: Venetia Burney (Proposed Pluto's name)
- Alternative designations: 1987 VB · 1950 TX_{2} 1984 YM_{5} · 1984 YO_{6}
- Minor planet category: main-belt · (inner) background (Note: (6235) Burney is considered a background asteroid in both synthetic HCMs by Nesvorny (Ferret) and Knezevic (AstDys-2)) · Flora

Orbital characteristics
- Epoch 23 March 2018 (JD 2458200.5)
- Uncertainty parameter 0
- Observation arc: 67.29 yr (24,578 d)
- Aphelion: 2.5616 AU
- Perihelion: 1.9231 AU
- Semi-major axis: 2.2423 AU
- Eccentricity: 0.1424
- Orbital period (sidereal): 3.36 yr (1,226 d)
- Mean anomaly: 0.6662°
- Mean motion: 0° 17^{m} 36.6^{s} / day
- Inclination: 2.9152°
- Longitude of ascending node: 283.50°
- Argument of perihelion: 129.57°

Physical characteristics
- Mean diameter: 3.64±0.68 km 4.05±0.73 km 4.083±0.156 km 4.50 km (calculated)
- Synodic rotation period: 15.515±0.002 h
- Geometric albedo: 0.24 (assumed); 0.29±0.11; 0.3509±0.0509; 0.351±0.051; 0.36±0.17
- Spectral type: L (Pan-STARRS); L (SDSS-MOC); S (assumed)
- Absolute magnitude (H): 13.7; 13.80; 13.88±0.23; 13.9; 14.28

6235 Burney, provisional designation 1987 VB, is a Florian or background asteroid from the inner regions of the asteroid belt, approximately 4 kilometers (2.5 miles) in diameter. It was discovered on 14 November 1987, by Japanese astronomers Seiji Ueda and Hiroshi Kaneda at the Kushiro Observatory on Hokkaido, Japan. The likely elongated L-type asteroid has a rotation period of 15.5 hours. It was named for Venetia Burney, who first proposed Pluto's name.

== Orbit and classification ==
Burney is a non-family asteroid of the main belt's background population when applying the hierarchical clustering method to its proper orbital elements. In the HCM assessment by Zappala and based on osculating Keplerian orbital elements, the asteroid has also been classified as a member of the Flora family (402), a giant asteroid family and the largest family of stony asteroids in the main-belt.

It orbits the Sun in the inner asteroid belt at a distance of 1.9–2.6 AU once every 3 years and 4 months (1,226 days; semi-major axis of 2.24 AU). Its orbit has an eccentricity of 0.14 and an inclination of 3° with respect to the ecliptic. The body's observation arc begins with its first observation as 1950 TX_{2} at Goethe Link Observatory in October 1950, more than 37 years prior to its official discovery observation at Kushiro.

== Physical characteristics ==
Burney has been characterized as an L-type asteroid by Pan-STARRS' survey and in the SDSS-based taxonomy. It is also an assumed S-type.

=== Rotation period ===
In December 2004, a rotational lightcurve of Burney was obtained from photometric observations by Donald Pray at the Carbuncle Hill Observatory (912). Lightcurve analysis gave a well-defined rotation period of 15.515 hours with a brightness variation of 0.60 magnitude (U=3). The Wide-field Infrared Survey Explorer (WISE) also measured a high amplitude 0.71 and 0.95 magnitude, which indicates that asteroid has an elongated shape.

=== Diameter and albedo ===
According to the survey carried out by the NEOWISE mission of NASA's WISE telescope, Burney measures between 3.64 and 4.083 kilometers in diameter and its surface has an albedo between 0.29 and 0.36.

The Collaborative Asteroid Lightcurve Link assumes an albedo of 0.24 – derived from 8 Flora, the parent body of the Flora family – and calculates a diameter of 4.50 kilometers based on an absolute magnitude of 13.9.

== Naming ==
This minor planet was named after Venetia Burney (1918–2009) who, as a girl of eleven, first suggested the mythological name Pluto – the Roman God of the Underworld who was able to make himself invisible – for the dwarf planet Pluto, then considered the ninth planet in the Solar System. The naming of the asteroid "Burney" was not suggested by the asteroid discoverers. It was designated by the Working Group for Small Bodies Nomenclature (SBN) of Division III (Planetary Systems Sciences) of the International Astronomical Union. The official naming citation was published by the Minor Planet Center on 15 December 2005 (M.P.C. 55720).
