= Seiji Ueda =

Japanese astronomer

Minor planets discovered: 705
credited by the MPC, as per August 2016

Seiji Ueda (上田 清二, Ueda Seiji; born 1952) is a Japanese astronomer. He is a prolific discoverer of minor planets. Between 1987 and 2000, Ueda discovered 705 asteroids, all of them in collaboration with Hiroshi Kaneda.

Ueda holds an MD and PhD from Stanford University and is on the staff at the Graduate University for Advanced Study in Japan. The inner main-belt asteroid 4676 Uedaseiji, discovered in 1990, is named for him.

== List of discovered minor planets ==
3720 Hokkaido	October 28, 1987
4000 Hipparchus	January 4, 1989
4096 Kushiro	November 15, 1987
4127 Kyogoku	January 25, 1988
4155 Watanabe	October 25, 1987
4215 Kamo	November 14, 1987
4260 Yanai	January 4, 1989
4282 Endate	October 28, 1987
4284 Kaho	March 16, 1988
4343 Tetsuya	January 10, 1988
4350 Shibecha	October 26, 1989
4410 Kamuimintara	December 17, 1989
4454 Kumiko	November 2, 1988
4455 Ruriko	December 2, 1988
4494 Marimo	October 13, 1988
4500 Pascal	February 3, 1989
4631 Yabu	November 22, 1987
4672 Takuboku	April 17, 1988
4719 Burnaby	November 21, 1990
4720 Tottori	December 19, 1990
4747 Jujo	November 19, 1989
4774 Hobetsu	February 14, 1991
4842 Atsushi	November 21, 1989
4844 Matsuyama	January 23, 1991
4863 Yasutani	November 13, 1987
5005 Kegler	October 16, 1988
5035 Swift	October 18, 1991
5036 Tuttle	October 31, 1991
5060 Yoneta	January 24, 1988
5070 Arai	December 9, 1991
5112 Kusaji	September 23, 1987
5114 Yezo	February 15, 1988
5125 Okushiri	February 10, 1989
5135 Nibutani	October 16, 1990
5140 Kida	December 8, 1990
5146 Moiwa	January 28, 1992
5147 Maruyama	January 28, 1992
5172 Yoshiyuki	October 28, 1987
5176 Yoichi	January 4, 1989
5190 Fry	October 16, 1990
5191 Paddack	November 13, 1990
5193 Tanakawataru	March 7, 1992
5205 Servián	February 11, 1988
5212 Celiacruz	September 29, 1989
5241 Beeson	December 23, 1990
5328 Nisiyamakoiti	October 26, 1989
5354 Hisayo	January 30, 1990
5355 Akihiro	February 3, 1991
5358 Meineko	August 26, 1992
5371 Albertoaccomazzi	November 15, 1987

5373 Michaelkurtz	November 14, 1988
(5376) 1990 DD	February 16, 1990
(5398) 1989 AK_{1}	January 13, 1989
(5400) 1989 CM	February 4, 1989
(5407) 1992 AX	January 4, 1992
(5429) 1988 BZ_{1}	January 25, 1988
(5449) 1992 US_{5}	October 28, 1992
(5472) 1988 RR	September 13, 1988
(5480) 1989 YK_{8}	December 23, 1989
(5486) 1991 UT_{2}	October 31, 1991
(5487) 1991 UM_{4}	October 18, 1991
(5527) 1991 UQ_{3}	October 31, 1991
(5528) 1992 AJ	January 2, 1992
(5556) 1988 AL	January 15, 1988
5562 Sumi	November 4, 1991
5563 Yuuri	November 9, 1991
5564 Hikari	November 9, 1991
(5566) 1991 VY_{3}	November 11, 1991
(5599) 1991 SG_{1}	September 29, 1991
(5600) 1991 UY	October 18, 1991
(5601) 1991 VR	November 4, 1991
(5602) 1991 VM_{1}	November 4, 1991
(5607) 1993 EN	March 12, 1993
5608 Olmos	March 12, 1993
(5646) 1990 TR	October 11, 1990
(5690) 1992 EU	March 7, 1992
(5729) 1988 TA_{1}	October 13, 1988
(5733) 1989 AQ	January 4, 1989
(5754) 1992 FR_{2}	March 24, 1992
5779 Schupmann	January 23, 1990
(5787) 1992 FA_{1}	March 26, 1992
(5814) 1988 XW_{1}	December 11, 1988
5826 Bradstreet	February 16, 1990
5831 Dizzy	May 4, 1991
5834 Kasai	September 28, 1992
(5853) 1992 QG	August 26, 1992
(5854) 1992 UP	October 19, 1992
5856 Peluk	January 5, 1994
(5880) 1992 MA	June 22, 1992
(5903) 1989 AN_{1}	January 6, 1989
(5911) 1989 WO_{7}	November 25, 1989
(5921) 1992 UL	October 19, 1992
(5925) 1994 CP_{1}	February 5, 1994
(5974) 1991 UZ_{2}	October 31, 1991
(5979) 1992 XF	December 15, 1992
(5980) 1993 FP_{2}	March 26, 1993
(6003) 1988 VO_{1}	November 2, 1988
(6004) 1988 XY_{1}	December 11, 1988
(6005) 1989 BD	January 29, 1989
6007 Billevans	January 28, 1990

(6008) 1990 BF_{2}	January 30, 1990
(6028) 1994 ER_{1}	March 11, 1994
(6048) 1991 UC_{1}	October 18, 1991
(6095) 1991 UU	October 18, 1991
(6096) 1991 UB_{2}	October 29, 1991
(6103) 1993 HV	April 16, 1993
(6125) 1989 CN	February 4, 1989
(6159) 1991 YH	December 30, 1991
(6196) 1991 UO_{4}	October 28, 1991
6207 Bourvil	January 24, 1988
6235 Burney	November 14, 1987
(6253) 1992 FJ	March 24, 1992
(6254) 1993 UM_{3}	October 20, 1993
(6272) 1992 EB	March 2, 1992
(6297) 1988 VZ_{1}	November 2, 1988
(6303) 1989 EL_{2}	March 12, 1989
(6315) 1990 TS	October 11, 1990
(6331) 1992 FZ_{1}	March 28, 1992
(6341) 1993 UN_{3}	October 20, 1993
(6342) 1993 VG	November 7, 1993
(6343) 1993 VK	November 7, 1993
(6344) 1993 VM	November 7, 1993
(6347) 1995 BM_{4}	January 28, 1995
(6348) 1995 CH_{1}	February 3, 1995
(6387) 1989 WC	November 19, 1989
(6388) 1989 WL_{1}	November 25, 1989
(6415) 1993 VR_{3}	November 11, 1993
(6421) 1993 XS_{1}	December 6, 1993
(6425) 1994 WZ_{3}	November 28, 1994
(6427) 1995 FY	March 28, 1995
(6495) 1992 UB_{1}	October 19, 1992
(6502) 1993 XR_{1}	December 6, 1993
(6503) 1994 CP	February 4, 1994
(6513) 1987 UW_{1}	October 28, 1987
6568 Serendip	February 21, 1993
6601 Schmeer	December 7, 1988
(6609) 1992 BN	January 28, 1992
(6662) 1993 BP_{13}	January 22, 1993
(6668) 1994 GY_{8}	April 11, 1994
(6724) 1991 CX_{5}	February 4, 1991
(6728) 1991 UM	October 18, 1991
(6732) 1992 CG_{1}	February 8, 1992
(6733) 1992 EF	March 2, 1992
6734 Benzenberg	March 23, 1992
(6791) 1991 UC_{2}	October 29, 1991
(6803) 1995 UK_{7}	October 27, 1995
(6831) 1991 UM_{1}	October 28, 1991
(6840) 1995 WW_{5}	November 18, 1995
(6872) 1993 CN_{1}	February 15, 1993
6921 Janejacobs	May 14, 1993

(6926) 1994 RO_{11}	September 1, 1994
(6930) 1994 VJ_{3}	November 7, 1994
(6934) 1994 YN_{2}	December 25, 1994
(6957) 1988 HA	April 16, 1988
(6958) 1988 TX_{1}	October 13, 1988
(6968) 1991 VX_{3}	November 11, 1991
6973 Karajan	April 27, 1992
(6985) 1994 UF_{2}	October 31, 1994
(6988) 1994 WE_{3}	November 28, 1994
(6993) 1995 BJ_{4}	January 28, 1995
(6994) 1995 BV_{4}	January 28, 1995
(7018) 1992 DF	February 25, 1992
(7022) 1992 JN_{4}	May 2, 1992
(7033) 1994 WN_{2}	November 28, 1994
(7034) 1994 YT_{2}	December 25, 1994
7063 Johnmichell	October 18, 1991
(7069) 1994 YG_{2}	December 30, 1994
(7070) 1994 YO_{2}	December 25, 1994
(7071) 1995 BH_{4}	January 28, 1995
(7089) 1992 FX_{1}	March 23, 1992
(7129) 1991 VE_{1}	November 4, 1991
(7138) 1994 AK_{15}	January 15, 1994
(7185) 1991 VN_{1}	November 4, 1991
(7243) 1990 VV_{3}	November 12, 1990
(7255) 1993 VY_{1}	November 11, 1993
(7282) 1989 BC	January 29, 1989
7295 Brozovic	June 22, 1992
(7302) 1993 CQ	February 10, 1993
(7303) 1993 FS_{1}	March 25, 1993
(7312) 1996 AT_{3}	January 13, 1996
(7340) 1991 UA_{2}	October 29, 1991
(7347) 1993 EW	March 12, 1993
7352 Hypsenor	February 4, 1994
(7357) 1995 UJ_{7}	October 27, 1995
(7405) 1988 FF	March 16, 1988
(7406) 1988 TD	October 3, 1988
(7407) 1988 TL	October 3, 1988
(7444) 1996 TM_{10}	October 9, 1996
(7467) 1989 WQ_{1}	November 25, 1989
(7479) 1994 EC_{1}	March 4, 1994
(7503) 1996 VJ_{38}	November 7, 1996
(7535) 1995 WU_{2}	November 16, 1995
(7539) 1996 XS_{32}	December 6, 1996
(7540) 1997 AK_{21}	January 9, 1997
(7567) 1988 TC_{1}	October 13, 1988
(7591) 1992 WG_{3}	November 18, 1992
(7598) 1994 CS	February 4, 1994
(7601) 1994 US_{1}	October 25, 1994
(7606) 1995 SV_{2}	September 20, 1995
(7612) 1996 CN_{2}	February 12, 1996

(7615) 1996 TA_{11}	October 9, 1996
(7617) 1996 VF_{30}	November 7, 1996
(7642) 1988 TZ	October 13, 1988
(7653) 1991 UV	October 18, 1991
(7654) 1991 VV_{3}	November 11, 1991
(7658) 1993 BM_{12}	January 22, 1993
(7659) 1993 CP_{1}	February 15, 1993
(7685) 1997 EP_{17}	March 1, 1997
7708 Fennimore	April 11, 1994
(7751) 1988 UA	October 16, 1988
7777 Consadole	February 15, 1993
(7834) 1993 JL	May 14, 1993
(7843) 1994 YE_{1}	December 22, 1994
(7875) 1991 ES_{1}	March 7, 1991
(7876) 1991 VW_{3}	November 11, 1991
(7930) 1987 VD	November 15, 1987
(7951) 1992 WC_{2}	November 18, 1992
(7962) 1994 WG_{3}	November 28, 1994
8031 Williamdana	March 7, 1992
8032 Michaeladams	March 8, 1992
(8033) 1992 FY_{1}	March 26, 1992
(8042) 1994 AX_{2}	January 12, 1994
(8095) 1992 WS_{2}	November 18, 1992
(8105) 1994 WH_{2}	November 28, 1994
(8177) 1992 BO	January 28, 1992
(8183) 1992 UE_{3}	October 22, 1992
8184 Luderic	November 16, 1992
(8185) 1992 WR_{2}	November 18, 1992
(8198) 1993 VE_{2}	November 11, 1993
(8211) 1995 EB_{1}	March 5, 1995
(8285) 1991 UK_{3}	October 31, 1991
(8293) 1992 UQ	October 19, 1992
(8352) 1989 GE	April 6, 1989
(8359) 1989 WD	November 19, 1989
(8372) 1991 VC_{2}	November 9, 1991
(8385) 1993 AN	January 13, 1993
8410 Hiroakiohno	August 24, 1996
8413 Kawakami	October 9, 1996
8414 Atsuko	October 9, 1996
8416 Okada	November 3, 1996
8419 Terumikazumi	November 7, 1996
(8504) 1990 YC	December 17, 1990
(8505) 1990 YK	December 19, 1990
(8508) 1991 CU_{1}	February 14, 1991
(8517) 1992 BB_{5}	January 28, 1992
(8542) 1993 VB_{2}	November 11, 1993
(8547) 1994 CQ	February 4, 1994
(8570) 1996 TN_{10}	October 9, 1996
(8576) 1996 VN_{8}	November 7, 1996
(8645) 1988 TN	October 5, 1988

(8646) 1988 TB_{1}	October 13, 1988
(8662) 1990 UT_{10}	October 22, 1990
(8674) 1991 VA_{1}	November 4, 1991
(8675) 1991 YZ	December 30, 1991
(8692) 1992 WH	November 16, 1992
(8694) 1993 CO	February 10, 1993
(8727) 1996 VZ_{7}	November 3, 1996
(8840) 1989 WT	November 20, 1989
(8848) 1990 VK_{1}	November 12, 1990
(8863) 1991 UV_{2}	October 31, 1991
(8908) 1995 WY_{6}	November 18, 1995
(8910) 1995 WV_{42}	November 25, 1995
(8920) 1996 VZ_{29}	November 7, 1996
(8921) 1996 VH_{30}	November 7, 1996
(8938) 1997 AF_{21}	January 9, 1997
(9051) 1991 UG_{3}	October 31, 1991
(9065) 1993 FN_{1}	March 25, 1993
(9086) 1995 SA_{3}	September 20, 1995
(9095) 1995 WT_{2}	November 16, 1995
(9169) 1988 TL_{1}	October 13, 1988
(9170) 1988 TG_{5}	October 3, 1988
(9192) 1992 AR_{1}	January 14, 1992
(9199) 1993 FO_{1}	March 25, 1993
(9209) 1994 UK_{1}	October 25, 1994
(9210) 1995 BW_{2}	January 27, 1995
(9213) 1995 UX_{5}	October 21, 1995
(9214) 1995 UC_{6}	October 21, 1995
(9311) 1987 UV_{1}	October 25, 1987
(9312) 1987 VE_{2}	November 15, 1987
(9324) 1989 CH_{4}	February 7, 1989
(9352) 1991 UB_{4}	October 31, 1991
(9354) 1991 VF_{7}	November 11, 1991
(9355) 1991 XO_{2}	December 5, 1991
(9363) 1992 GR	April 3, 1992
(9402) 1994 UN_{1}	October 25, 1994
(9404) 1994 UQ_{11}	October 26, 1994
(9406) 1994 WG_{2}	November 28, 1994
(9412) 1995 GZ_{8}	April 4, 1995
(9597) 1991 UF	October 18, 1991
(9598) 1991 UQ	October 18, 1991
(9600) 1991 UB_{3}	October 31, 1991
(9601) 1991 UE_{3}	October 18, 1991
(9603) 1991 VG_{2}	November 9, 1991
(9606) 1992 BZ	January 28, 1992
(9625) 1993 HF	April 16, 1993
(9652) 1996 AF_{2}	January 12, 1996
(9659) 1996 EJ	March 10, 1996
(9747) 1989 AT	January 4, 1989
(9776) 1993 VL_{3}	November 11, 1993
(9779) 1994 RA_{11}	September 1, 1994

(9787) 1995 BA_{3}	January 27, 1995
(9789) 1995 GO_{7}	April 4, 1995
(9798) 1996 JK	May 8, 1996
(9868) 1991 VP_{1}	November 4, 1991
(9889) 1995 FG_{1}	March 28, 1995
(9890) 1995 SY_{2}	September 20, 1995
(9953) 1991 EB	March 7, 1991
(9958) 1991 VL1	November 4, 1991
(9959) 1991 VF2	November 9, 1991
(9961) 1991 XK	December 4, 1991
10077 Raykoenig	October 26, 1989
(10118) 1992 UK_{1}	October 19, 1992
10156 Darnley	November 7, 1994
10196 Akiraarai	October 9, 1996
(10225) 1997 VQ_{1}	November 1, 1997
(10228) 1997 VY_{8}	November 1, 1997
(10240) 1998 VW_{34}	November 12, 1998
(10329) 1991 GJ_{1}	April 11, 1991
(10360) 1993 VN	November 7, 1993
(10362) 1994 UC_{2}	October 31, 1994
(10384) 1996 TQ_{10}	October 9, 1996
(10398) 1997 UP_{8}	October 23, 1997
(10406) 1997 WZ_{29}	November 24, 1997
(10517) 1990 BH_{1}	January 28, 1990
(10528) 1990 VX_{3}	November 12, 1990
(10530) 1991 EA	March 7, 1991
(10539) 1991 VH_{4}	November 9, 1991
(10597) 1996 TR_{10}	October 9, 1996
(10599) 1996 TK_{15}	October 9, 1996
(10600) 1996 TK_{48}	October 9, 1996
(10752) 1989 WJ_{1}	November 25, 1989
(10772) 1990 YM	December 23, 1990
(10788) 1991 UC	October 18, 1991
(10790) 1991 XS	December 5, 1991
(10833) 1993 VJ_{4}	November 11, 1993
(10842) 1994 UY_{1}	October 31, 1994
(10843) 1994 YF_{2}	December 30, 1994
(10846) 1995 AW_{2}	January 2, 1995
(10903) 1997 WA_{30}	November 24, 1997
(11044) 1990 DV	February 28, 1990
(11053) 1991 CQ_{6}	February 3, 1991
(11068) 1992 EA	March 2, 1992
(11077) 1992 WB_{2}	November 18, 1992
(11078) 1992 WH_{2}	November 18, 1992
(11116) 1996 EK	March 10, 1996
(11125) 1996 TL_{10}	October 9, 1996
(11130) 1996 VA_{30}	November 7, 1996
(11131) 1996 VO_{30}	November 7, 1996
(11168) 1998 FO_{15}	March 21, 1998
(11276) 1988 TM_{1}	October 13, 1988

(11293) 1991 XL	December 4, 1991
(11300) 1992 WG_{2}	November 18, 1992
(11347) 1997 AG_{21}	January 9, 1997
(11386) 1998 TA_{18}	October 12, 1998
(11391) 1998 VA_{35}	November 12, 1998
(11482) 1988 BW	January 25, 1988
(11489) 1988 SN	September 22, 1988
(11490) 1988 TE	October 3, 1988
(11491) 1988 VT_{2}	November 8, 1988
(11502) 1989 WU_{2}	November 21, 1989
(11526) 1991 UL_{3}	October 31, 1991
(11529) 1992 BJ_{1}	January 28, 1992
(11536) 1992 FZ	March 26, 1992
(11541) 1992 SY_{14}	September 28, 1992
(11555) 1993 CR_{1}	February 15, 1993
(11556) 1993 DV	February 21, 1993
(11586) 1994 UA_{2}	October 31, 1994
(11587) 1994 UH_{2}	October 31, 1994
(11590) 1994 WH_{3}	November 28, 1994
(11594) 1995 HP	April 27, 1995
(11617) 1996 CL_{2}	February 12, 1996
(11619) 1996 GG_{17}	April 13, 1996
(11629) 1996 VY_{29}	November 7, 1996
(11635) 1996 XQ_{32}	December 6, 1996
(11658) 1997 EQ_{17}	March 1, 1997
(11872) 1989 WR	November 20, 1989
(11940) 1993 GR	April 15, 1993
(11971) 1994 UJ_{2}	October 31, 1994
(11990) 1995 WM_{6}	November 21, 1995
(12000) 1996 CK_{2}	February 12, 1996
(12250) 1988 TT	October 13, 1988
(12307) 1991 UA	October 18, 1991
(12315) 1992 FA_{2}	March 28, 1992
(12333) 1992 WJ_{2}	November 18, 1992
12370 Kageyasu	April 11, 1994
(12422) 1995 US_{8}	October 27, 1995
(12764) 1993 VA_{2}	November 11, 1993
(12765) 1993 VA_{3}	November 11, 1993
(13026) 1989 CX	February 7, 1989
(13056) 1990 VN_{1}	November 12, 1990
(13075) 1991 UN_{1}	October 28, 1991
(13076) 1991 VT_{3}	November 11, 1991
(13095) 1992 WY_{1}	November 18, 1992
(13119) 1993 VD_{4}	November 11, 1993
(13136) 1994 UJ_{1}	October 25, 1994
(13137) 1994 UT_{1}	October 26, 1994
(13142) 1994 YM_{2}	December 25, 1994
(13165) 1995 WS_{1}	November 16, 1995
(13166) 1995 WU_{1}	November 16, 1995
(13364) 1998 UK_{20}	October 20, 1998

(13378) 1998 VF_{35}	November 12, 1998
(13502) 1987 WD	November 17, 1987
(13518) 1990 VL_{1}	November 12, 1990
(13541) 1991 VP_{3}	November 4, 1991
(13548) 1992 ER_{1}	March 8, 1992
(13566) 1992 UM_{9}	October 19, 1992
(13611) 1994 UM_{1}	October 25, 1994
(13612) 1994 UQ_{1}	October 25, 1994
(13613) 1994 UA_{3}	October 26, 1994
(13632) 1995 WP_{8}	November 18, 1995
(13634) 1995 WY_{41}	November 16, 1995
(13639) 1996 EG_{2}	March 10, 1996
(13783) 1998 UJ_{20}	October 20, 1998
(13802) 1998 WR_{3}	November 18, 1998
(13971) 1991 UF_{1}	October 18, 1991
(13972) 1991 UN_{3}	October 31, 1991
(13973) 1991 UZ_{3}	October 31, 1991
(13985) 1992 UH_{3}	October 22, 1992
(13986) 1992 WA_{4}	November 21, 1992
(13987) 1992 WK_{9}	November 16, 1992
(14030) 1994 UP_{1}	October 25, 1994
(14038) 1995 HR	April 27, 1995
(14368) 1988 TK	October 3, 1988
(14369) 1988 UV	October 18, 1988
(14375) 1989 SU	September 29, 1989
(14410) 1991 RR_{1}	September 7, 1991
(14415) 1991 RQ_{7}	September 13, 1991
(14427) 1991 VJ_{2}	November 9, 1991
(14448) 1992 VQ	November 2, 1992
(14450) 1992 WZ_{1}	November 18, 1992
(14451) 1992 WR_{5}	November 27, 1992
(14490) 1994 US_{2}	October 31, 1994
(14494) 1994 YJ_{2}	December 30, 1994
(14496) 1995 BK_{4}	January 28, 1995
(14503) 1995 WW_{42}	November 25, 1995
(14556) 1997 VN_{1}	November 1, 1997
(14633) 1998 VY_{34}	November 12, 1998
(14640) 1998 WF_{4}	November 18, 1998
(14641) 1998 WC_{6}	November 18, 1998
(14841) 1988 TU	October 13, 1988
(14842) 1988 TN_{1}	October 13, 1988
(14844) 1988 VT_{3}	November 14, 1988
(14859) 1989 WU_{1}	November 25, 1989
(14903) 1993 DF_{2}	February 25, 1993
(14930) 1994 WL_{3}	November 28, 1994
(14950) 1996 BE_{2}	January 18, 1996
(14984) 1997 TN_{26}	October 11, 1997
(14997) 1997 VD_{4}	November 1, 1997
(15035) 1998 WS_{3}	November 18, 1998
(15154) 2000 FW_{30}	March 27, 2000

(15163) 2000 GB_{4}	April 2, 2000
(15247) 1989 WS	November 20, 1989
(15291) 1991 VO_{1}	November 4, 1991
(15292) 1991 VD_{2}	November 9, 1991
(15293) 1991 VO_{3}	November 4, 1991
(15306) 1992 WK_{2}	November 18, 1992
(15349) 1994 UX_{1}	October 31, 1994
(15709) 1988 XH_{1}	December 7, 1988
(15754) 1992 EP	March 7, 1992
(15823) 1994 UO_{1}	October 25, 1994
(15842) 1995 SX_{2}	September 20, 1995
(15871) 1996 QX_{1}	August 24, 1996
(15876) 1996 VO_{38}	November 12, 1996
(15942) 1997 YZ_{16}	December 23, 1997
(16420) 1987 UN_{1}	October 28, 1987
(16433) 1988 VX_{2}	November 8, 1988
(16457) 1989 VF	November 2, 1989
(16461) 1990 BO	January 21, 1990
(16554) 1991 UE_{2}	October 29, 1991
(16556) 1991 VQ_{1}	November 4, 1991
(16557) 1991 VE_{2}	November 9, 1991
(16571) 1992 EE	March 2, 1992
(16579) 1992 GO	April 3, 1992
(16600) 1993 DQ	February 21, 1993
(16601) 1993 FQ_{1}	March 25, 1993
(16627) 1993 JK	May 14, 1993
(16661) 1993 VS_{1}	November 11, 1993
(16662) 1993 VU_{1}	November 11, 1993
(16663) 1993 VG_{4}	November 11, 1993
(16721) 1995 WF_{3}	November 16, 1995
(16735) 1996 JJ	May 8, 1996
(16762) 1996 TK_{10}	October 9, 1996
(16776) 1996 VA_{8}	November 3, 1996
(17432) 1989 SR	September 29, 1989
(17490) 1991 UC_{3}	October 31, 1991
(17491) 1991 UM_{3}	October 31, 1991
(17513) 1992 UM	October 19, 1992
(17514) 1992 UA_{1}	October 19, 1992
(17517) 1992 WZ_{3}	November 21, 1992
(17613) 1995 UP_{7}	October 27, 1995
(17621) 1995 WD_{1}	November 16, 1995
(17626) 1996 AG_{2}	January 12, 1996
(17661) 1996 VW_{7}	November 3, 1996
(17662) 1996 VG_{30}	November 7, 1996
(17663) 1996 VK_{30}	November 7, 1996
(17664) 1996 VP_{30}	November 7, 1996
(18378) 1991 UX_{2}	October 31, 1991
(18401) 1992 WE_{4}	November 21, 1992
(18459) 1995 FD_{1}	March 28, 1995
(18470) 1995 UX_{44}	October 27, 1995

(18487) 1996 AU_{3}	January 13, 1996
(18515) 1996 TL_{14}	October 9, 1996
(18525) 1996 VO_{8}	November 7, 1996
(18526) 1996 VB_{30}	November 7, 1996
(18527) 1996 VJ_{30}	November 7, 1996
(18652) 1998 FD_{15}	March 21, 1998
(18741) 1998 WB_{6}	November 18, 1998
(19211) 1993 DM	February 21, 1993
(19256) 1994 WA_{4}	November 28, 1994
(19285) 1996 CM_{9}	February 12, 1996
(19305) 1996 TH_{10}	October 9, 1996
(19519) 1998 WB_{8}	November 18, 1998
(20018) 1991 UJ_{2}	October 29, 1991
(20039) 1992 WJ	November 16, 1992
(20097) 1994 UL_{2}	October 31, 1994
(20099) 1994 WB_{3}	November 28, 1994
(20110) 1995 SS_{2}	September 20, 1995
(20154) 1996 TO_{10}	October 9, 1996
(20170) 1996 VM_{30}	November 7, 1996
(21019) 1988 VC_{2}	November 2, 1988
(21084) 1991 UV_{3}	October 31, 1991
(21085) 1991 UL_{4}	October 18, 1991
(21119) 1992 UJ	October 19, 1992
(21165) 1993 VF_{2}	November 11, 1993
(21216) 1994 UZ_{1}	October 31, 1994
(21218) 1994 VP_{7}	November 7, 1994
(21242) 1995 WZ_{41}	November 25, 1995
(21253) 1996 AX_{3}	January 13, 1996
(21279) 1996 TS_{10}	October 9, 1996
(21297) 1996 VW_{29}	November 7, 1996
(21298) 1996 VX_{29}	November 7, 1996
(21597) 1998 WA_{8}	November 18, 1998
(22289) 1988 XV_{1}	December 11, 1988
(22298) 1990 EJ	March 2, 1990
(22349) 1992 UH	October 19, 1992
(22353) 1992 UA_{6}	October 28, 1992
(22408) 1995 SC_{3}	September 20, 1995
(22445) 1996 TT_{14}	October 9, 1996
(22452) 1996 VD_{8}	November 3, 1996
(23447) 1987 VG	November 15, 1987
(23499) 1991 VY_{12}	November 11, 1991
(23518) 1992 SP_{1}	September 20, 1992
(23522) 1992 WC_{9}	November 18, 1992
(23523) 1993 AQ	January 13, 1993
(23592) 1995 UB_{47}	October 27, 1995
(24668) 1988 TV	October 13, 1988
(24669) 1988 VV	November 2, 1988
(24670) 1988 VA_{5}	November 14, 1988
(24724) 1991 UN	October 18, 1991
(24725) 1991 UD_{3}	October 31, 1991

(24727) 1991 VD_{1}	November 4, 1991
(24752) 1992 UN	October 19, 1992
(24755) 1992 UQ_{6}	October 28, 1992
(24795) 1994 AC_{17}	January 5, 1994
(24815) 1994 VQ_{6}	November 7, 1994
(24831) 1995 SX_{4}	September 21, 1995
(24849) 1995 WQ_{41}	November 16, 1995
(25286) 1998 WC_{8}	November 18, 1998
(26093) 1987 UA_{1}	October 25, 1987
(26121) 1992 BX	January 28, 1992
(26159) 1994 WN_{3}	November 28, 1994
(26824) 1988 TW_{1}	October 13, 1988
(26843) 1991 UK_{1}	October 28, 1991
(26847) 1992 DG	February 25, 1992
(26854) 1992 WB	November 16, 1992
(27111) 1998 VV_{34}	November 12, 1998
(27112) 1998 VC_{35}	November 12, 1998
(27768) 1991 UV_{1}	October 29, 1991
(27769) 1991 UA_{3}	October 31, 1991
(27770) 1991 VF_{1}	November 4, 1991
(27788) 1993 AS	January 13, 1993
(27793) 1993 FL_{1}	March 25, 1993
(27828) 1994 AY_{2}	January 12, 1994
(27850) 1994 UD_{2}	October 31, 1994
(27860) 1995 BV_{2}	January 27, 1995
(27912) 1996 TJ_{14}	October 9, 1996
(29139) 1988 CP	February 15, 1988
(29145) 1988 FE	March 16, 1988
(29147) 1988 GG	April 11, 1988
(29155) 1988 XE	December 2, 1988
(29156) 1989 CH	February 3, 1989
(29165) 1989 UK_{1}	October 26, 1989
(29215) 1991 UE	October 18, 1991
(29217) 1991 VV_{12}	November 4, 1991
(29219) 1992 BJ	January 24, 1992
(29228) 1992 EC	March 2, 1992
(29253) 1993 DN	February 21, 1993
(29254) 1993 FR_{1}	March 25, 1993
(29313) 1994 CR	February 4, 1994
(29338) 1995 AV_{2}	January 2, 1995
(29422) 1997 AH_{21}	January 9, 1997
(29423) 1997 AF_{22}	January 9, 1997
(29480) 1997 VO_{1}	November 1, 1997
(30800) 1989 ST	September 29, 1989
(30839) 1991 GH_{1}	April 11, 1991
(30853) 1991 UH_{3}	October 31, 1991
(30859) 1992 BM	January 28, 1992
(30878) 1992 GQ	April 3, 1992
(30887) 1992 WL_{2}	November 18, 1992
(30960) 1994 UV_{2}	October 26, 1994

(30976) 1995 FH_{1}	March 28, 1995
(31003) 1995 WQ_{2}	November 16, 1995
(31062) 1996 TP_{10}	October 9, 1996
(31073) 1996 VV_{29}	November 7, 1996
(31148) 1997 UO_{8}	October 23, 1997
(31425) 1999 BF3	January 16, 1999
(32784) 1989 AR	January 4, 1989
(32826) 1992 DC_{1}	February 26, 1992
(32845) 1992 FU_{1}	March 26, 1992
(32942) 1995 UD_{7}	October 27, 1995
(35063) 1988 FD	March 16, 1988
(35109) 1991 XM	December 4, 1991
(35145) 1993 AM	January 13, 1993
(35186) 1993 VV_{1}	November 11, 1993
(35187) 1993 VW_{1}	November 11, 1993
(35188) 1993 VP_{3}	November 11, 1993
(35375) 1997 VP_{1}	November 1, 1997
(35684) 1999 BO_{5}	January 16, 1999
(37564) 1988 TR_{3}	October 13, 1988
(37593) 1991 UJ	October 18, 1991
(37595) 1991 UZ_{1}	October 29, 1991
(37639) 1993 VR_{1}	November 11, 1993
(37740) 1996 VU_{29}	November 7, 1996
(39634) 1994 WM_{2}	November 28, 1994
(39665) 1995 WU_{6}	November 16, 1995
(39701) 1996 TF_{10}	October 9, 1996
(39702) 1996 TZ_{10}	October 9, 1996
(39704) 1996 TG_{15}	October 9, 1996
(39709) 1996 TH_{48}	October 9, 1996
(39722) 1996 VY_{7}	November 3, 1996
(42483) 1990 VM_{1}	November 12, 1990
(42502) 1993 CS_{1}	February 10, 1993
(42560) 1996 VL_{30}	November 7, 1996
(43771) 1988 TJ	October 3, 1988
(43772) 1988 TV_{1}	October 13, 1988
(43814) 1991 UE_{1}	October 18, 1991
(43826) 1992 UC_{6}	October 28, 1992
(43874) 1994 VZ_{6}	November 7, 1994
(43905) 1995 WC_{1}	November 16, 1995
(43920) 1996 CJ_{2}	February 12, 1996
(46571) 1991 VG_{1}	November 4, 1991
(46587) 1992 UJ_{1}	October 22, 1992
(46635) 1994 WK_{2}	November 28, 1994
(46636) 1994 WD_{3}	November 28, 1994
(46639) 1995 BN_{4}	January 28, 1995
(46641) 1995 EY	March 5, 1995
(46992) 1998 TZ_{17}	October 12, 1998
(48423) 1988 WA	November 17, 1988
(48439) 1989 WR_{2}	November 20, 1989
(48474) 1991 UR	October 18, 1991

(48475) 1991 UD_{2}	October 29, 1991
(48476) 1991 UP_{3}	October 31, 1991
(48479) 1991 XF	December 4, 1991
(48493) 1992 WG	November 16, 1992
(48494) 1992 WM	November 16, 1992
(48596) 1994 VY_{6}	November 7, 1994
(48609) 1995 DE_{14}	February 19, 1995
(48644) 1995 UG_{7}	October 27, 1995
(48647) 1995 UT_{8}	October 27, 1995
(48658) 1995 WT_{1}	November 16, 1995
(49345) 1998 WH_{4}	November 18, 1998
(52343) 1992 WX_{1}	November 18, 1992
(52470) 1995 ST_{2}	September 20, 1995
(52533) 1996 TJ_{10}	October 9, 1996
(52540) 1996 TJ_{48}	October 9, 1996
(52634) 1997 WR_{28}	November 24, 1997
(53022) 1998 VU_{44}	November 12, 1998
(53030) 1998 WC_{7}	November 18, 1998
(55738) 1988 VG_{3}	November 14, 1988
(58219) 1992 WZ_{2}	November 18, 1992
(58333) 1994 UL_{1}	October 25, 1994
(58626) 1997 VF_{5}	November 1, 1997
(59096) 1998 WT_{3}	November 18, 1998
(65687) 1990 VO_{1}	November 12, 1990
(65713) 1992 UQ_{1}	October 19, 1992
(65714) 1992 VR	November 2, 1992
(65715) 1992 WV_{1}	November 16, 1992
(65765) 1994 UR_{1}	October 25, 1994
(69377) 1994 WJ_{3}	November 28, 1994
(69418) 1995 WX_{42}	November 25, 1995
(69942) 1998 UC_{31}	October 25, 1998
(69962) 1998 VX_{34}	November 12, 1998
(69976) 1998 WD_{6}	November 18, 1998
(73675) 1988 CF	February 8, 1988
(73678) 1988 TY	October 13, 1988
(73708) 1992 DV	February 25, 1992
(73855) 1996 VE_{30}	November 7, 1996
(74354) 1998 WA_{6}	November 18, 1998
(79206) 1993 VX_{1}	November 11, 1993
(79299) 1995 WS_{2}	November 16, 1995
(79827) 1998 WU_{3}	November 18, 1998
(85191) 1991 RP_{4}	September 7, 1991
(85415) 1996 VE_{38}	November 3, 1996
(90776) 1993 VW_{2}	November 11, 1993
(90829) 1995 UY_{5}	October 21, 1995
(91022) 1998 DV_{31}	February 19, 1998
(96181) 1988 VW_{2}	November 8, 1988
(100011) 1988 VE_{3}	November 11, 1988
(134363) 1994 VG_{3}	November 7, 1994
(136829) 1997 SL_{32}	September 30, 1997

(150113) 1991 VX_{4}	November 4, 1991
(150138) 1995 WR_{1}	November 16, 1995
(155370) 1988 TX	October 13, 1988
(181703) 1988 TS	October 13, 1988
(181706) 1991 UY_{3}	October 13, 1991
All discoveries in combination with Hiroshi Kaneda
