= 4672 Takuboku =

Main-belt asteroid

Discovery
- Discovered by: S. Ueda; H. Kaneda
- Discovery site: Kushiro Obs.
- Discovery date: 17 April 1988

Designations
- Named after: Takuboku Ishikawa (Japanese poet)
- Alternative designations: 1988 HB · 1971 HT; 1979 WS_{7} · 1981 AN_{3}
- Minor planet category: main-belt · (outer) background

Orbital characteristics
- Epoch 23 March 2018 (JD 2458200.5)
- Uncertainty parameter 0
- Observation arc: 46.11 yr (16,841 d)
- Aphelion: 3.3411 AU
- Perihelion: 3.0318 AU
- Semi-major axis: 3.1864 AU
- Eccentricity: 0.0485
- Orbital period (sidereal): 5.69 yr (2,078 d)
- Mean anomaly: 45.665°
- Mean motion: 0° 10^{m} 23.88^{s} / day
- Inclination: 15.530°
- Longitude of ascending node: 91.663°
- Argument of perihelion: 175.66°

Physical characteristics
- Dimensions: 35.0 km × 35.0 km (occultation)
- Mean diameter: 28.115±0.258 km 35.59±1.9
- Geometric albedo: 0.0609±0.007; 0.108±0.018
- Absolute magnitude (H): 10.90; 11.4

4672 Takuboku, provisional designation 1988 HB, is a background asteroid from the outer regions of the asteroid belt, approximately 35 kilometers (22 miles) in diameter. It was discovered on 17 April 1988, by Japanese astronomers Seiji Ueda and Hiroshi Kaneda at the Kushiro Observatory on Hokkaido, Japan. The asteroid was named after the Japanese poet Takuboku Ishikawa. In 2005, measurement of the body's occultation ellipse also gave 35.0 × 35.0 kilometers.

== Orbit and classification ==
Takuboku is a non-family asteroid from the main belt's background population. It orbits the Sun in the outer main-belt at a distance of 3.0–3.3 AU once every 5 years and 8 months (2,078 days; semi-major axis of 3.19 AU). Its orbit has an eccentricity of 0.05 and an inclination of 16° with respect to the ecliptic.

The body's observation arc begins with its first observation as 1971 HT at Crimea–Nauchnij in April 1971, or 17 years prior to its official discovery observation at Kushiro.

== Physical characteristics ==
Takuboku has an absolute magnitude of between 10.90 and 11.4. As of 2018, no rotational lightcurve of Takuboku has been obtained from photometric observations. The body's rotation period, pole and shape remain unknown.

=== Diameter and albedo ===
According to the surveys carried out by the NEOWISE mission of NASA's Wide-field Infrared Survey Explorer and the Infrared Astronomical Satellite IRAS, Takuboku measures 28.115 and 35.59 kilometers in diameter and its surface has an albedo of 0.108 and 0.0609, respectively.

=== Occultation ===
On 13 June 2005, Takuboku occulted 9.3 magnitude star TYC 0312-00789-1, causing a predicted magnitude drop 6.8 during 4.3 seconds. The occultation was visible over the southern island of New Zealand only. Measurement of the asteroid's occultation dimensions was 35.0 × 35.0 km for its major and minor best-fit ellipse (the fit's quality code is 1). (Note: Occultation Prediction Chart: Occultation by (4672) Takuboku - TYC 0312-00789u on 13 June 2005, 11:51 UT)

== Naming ==
This minor planet was named after Japanese poet Takuboku Ishikawa (1886–1912) who lived in Japan's late Meiji-era. He is best known for Ichiaku no Suna (A Handful of Sand) a collection of 551 tanka poems published in 1910. The official naming citation was published by the Minor Planet Center on 10 November 1992 (M.P.C. 21131).
