= Hiroshi Kaneda =

Japanese astronomer

Minor planets discovered: 705
see § List of discovered minor planets

Hiroshi Kaneda (金田 宏, Kaneda Hiroshi; born 1953) is a Japanese astronomer and discoverer of minor planets from Sapporo, in the northernmost prefecture of Japan.

Kaneda ranks among the world's most prolific individual discoverers of minor planets. He is credited by the Minor Planet Center with the co-discovery of 705 numbered minor planets, between 1987 and 2000, all of them in collaboration with astronomer Seiji Ueda. Along with being an astronomer, Kaneda works as a computer programmer and is a developer of astronomy-related software.

The main-belt asteroid 4677 Hiroshi, discovered by Atsushi Takahashi and Kazurō Watanabe at Kitami in 1990, is named after him.

== List of discovered minor planets ==
His many minor planet discoveries include (5646) 1990 TR, a near-Earth object of the Amor group, (9958) 1991 VL1, an asteroid from the main-belt, (5407) 1992 AX, a Mars-crossing asteroid, (7352) 1994 CO, a Jupiter trojan, as well as the three named main-belt asteroids: 4672 Takuboku, 5176 Yoichi and 6235 Burney (the latter was not named by him). As of 2016, most of his numbered discoveries remain unnamed (see table below). All minor planets were co-discovered with Seiji Ueda.

3720 Hokkaido	28 October 1987	list^{[A]}
4000 Hipparchus	4 January 1989	list^{[A]}
4096 Kushiro	15 November 1987	list^{[A]}
4127 Kyogoku	25 January 1988	list^{[A]}
4155 Watanabe	25 October 1987	list^{[A]}
4215 Kamo	14 November 1987	list^{[A]}
4260 Yanai	4 January 1989	list^{[A]}
4282 Endate	28 October 1987	list^{[A]}
4284 Kaho	16 March 1988	list^{[A]}
4343 Tetsuya	10 January 1988	list^{[A]}
4350 Shibecha	26 October 1989	list^{[A]}
4410 Kamuimintara	17 December 1989	list^{[A]}
4454 Kumiko	2 November 1988	list^{[A]}
4455 Ruriko	2 December 1988	list^{[A]}
4494 Marimo	13 October 1988	list^{[A]}
4500 Pascal	3 February 1989	list^{[A]}
4631 Yabu	22 November 1987	list^{[A]}
4672 Takuboku	17 April 1988	list^{[A]}
4719 Burnaby	21 November 1990	list^{[A]}
4720 Tottori	19 December 1990	list^{[A]}
4747 Jujo	19 November 1989	list^{[A]}
4774 Hobetsu	14 February 1991	list^{[A]}
4842 Atsushi	21 November 1989	list^{[A]}
4844 Matsuyama	23 January 1991	list^{[A]}
4863 Yasutani	13 November 1987	list^{[A]}

5005 Kegler	16 October 1988	list^{[A]}
5035 Swift	18 October 1991	list^{[A]}
5036 Tuttle	31 October 1991	list^{[A]}
5060 Yoneta	24 January 1988	list^{[A]}
5070 Arai	9 December 1991	list^{[A]}
5112 Kusaji	23 September 1987	list^{[A]}
5114 Yezo	15 February 1988	list^{[A]}
5125 Okushiri	10 February 1989	list^{[A]}
5135 Nibutani	16 October 1990	list^{[A]}
5140 Kida	8 December 1990	list^{[A]}
5146 Moiwa	28 January 1992	list^{[A]}
5147 Maruyama	28 January 1992	list^{[A]}
5172 Yoshiyuki	28 October 1987	list^{[A]}
5176 Yoichi	4 January 1989	list^{[A]}
5190 Fry	16 October 1990	list^{[A]}
5191 Paddack	13 November 1990	list^{[A]}
5193 Tanakawataru	7 March 1992	list^{[A]}
5205 Servian	11 February 1988	list^{[A]}
5212 Celiacruz	29 September 1989	list^{[A]}
5241 Beeson	23 December 1990	list^{[A]}
5328 Nisiyamakoiti	26 October 1989	list^{[A]}
5354 Hisayo	30 January 1990	list^{[A]}
5355 Akihiro	3 February 1991	list^{[A]}
5358 Meineko	26 August 1992	list^{[A]}
5371 Albertoaccomazzi	15 November 1987	list^{[A]}

5373 Michaelkurtz	14 November 1988	list^{[A]}
(5376) 1990 DD	16 February 1990	list^{[A]}
(5398) 1989 AK1	13 January 1989	list^{[A]}
(5400) 1989 CM	4 February 1989	list^{[A]}
(5407) 1992 AX	4 January 1992	list^{[A]}
(5429) 1988 BZ1	25 January 1988	list^{[A]}
(5449) 1992 US5	28 October 1992	list^{[A]}
(5472) 1988 RR	13 September 1988	list^{[A]}
(5480) 1989 YK8	23 December 1989	list^{[A]}
(5486) 1991 UT2	31 October 1991	list^{[A]}
(5487) 1991 UM4	18 October 1991	list^{[A]}
(5527) 1991 UQ3	31 October 1991	list^{[A]}
(5528) 1992 AJ	2 January 1992	list^{[A]}
(5556) 1988 AL	15 January 1988	list^{[A]}
(5562) 1991 VS	4 November 1991	list^{[A]}
(5563) 1991 VZ1	9 November 1991	list^{[A]}
(5564) 1991 VH2	9 November 1991	list^{[A]}
(5566) 1991 VY3	11 November 1991	list^{[A]}
(5599) 1991 SG1	29 September 1991	list^{[A]}
(5600) 1991 UY	18 October 1991	list^{[A]}
(5601) 1991 VR	4 November 1991	list^{[A]}
(5602) 1991 VM1	4 November 1991	list^{[A]}
(5607) 1993 EN	12 March 1993	list^{[A]}
5608 Olmos	12 March 1993	list^{[A]}
(5646) 1990 TR	11 October 1990	list^{[A]}

(5690) 1992 EU	7 March 1992	list^{[A]}
(5729) 1988 TA1	13 October 1988	list^{[A]}
(5733) 1989 AQ	4 January 1989	list^{[A]}
(5754) 1992 FR2	24 March 1992	list^{[A]}
5779 Schupmann	23 January 1990	list^{[A]}
(5787) 1992 FA1	26 March 1992	list^{[A]}
(5814) 1988 XW1	11 December 1988	list^{[A]}
5826 Bradstreet	16 February 1990	list^{[A]}
5831 Dizzy	4 May 1991	list^{[A]}
(5834) 1992 SZ14	28 September 1992	list^{[A]}
(5853) 1992 QG	26 August 1992	list^{[A]}
(5854) 1992 UP	19 October 1992	list^{[A]}
5856 Peluk	5 January 1994	list^{[A]}
(5880) 1992 MA	22 June 1992	list^{[A]}
(5903) 1989 AN1	6 January 1989	list^{[A]}
(5911) 1989 WO7	25 November 1989	list^{[A]}
(5921) 1992 UL	19 October 1992	list^{[A]}
(5925) 1994 CP1	5 February 1994	list^{[A]}
(5974) 1991 UZ2	31 October 1991	list^{[A]}
(5979) 1992 XF	15 December 1992	list^{[A]}
(5980) 1993 FP2	26 March 1993	list^{[A]}
(6003) 1988 VO1	2 November 1988	list^{[A]}
(6004) 1988 XY1	11 December 1988	list^{[A]}
(6005) 1989 BD	29 January 1989	list^{[A]}
6007 Billevans	28 January 1990	list^{[A]}

(6008) 1990 BF2	30 January 1990	list^{[A]}
(6028) 1994 ER1	11 March 1994	list^{[A]}
(6048) 1991 UC1	18 October 1991	list^{[A]}
(6095) 1991 UU	18 October 1991	list^{[A]}
(6096) 1991 UB2	29 October 1991	list^{[A]}
(6103) 1993 HV	16 April 1993	list^{[A]}
(6125) 1989 CN	4 February 1989	list^{[A]}
(6159) 1991 YH	30 December 1991	list^{[A]}
(6196) 1991 UO4	28 October 1991	list^{[A]}
6207 Bourvil	24 January 1988	list^{[A]}
6235 Burney	14 November 1987	list^{[A]}
(6253) 1992 FJ	24 March 1992	list^{[A]}
(6254) 1993 UM3	20 October 1993	list^{[A]}
(6272) 1992 EB	2 March 1992	list^{[A]}
(6297) 1988 VZ1	2 November 1988	list^{[A]}
(6303) 1989 EL2	12 March 1989	list^{[A]}
(6315) 1990 TS	11 October 1990	list^{[A]}
(6331) 1992 FZ1	28 March 1992	list^{[A]}
(6341) 1993 UN3	20 October 1993	list^{[A]}
(6342) 1993 VG	7 November 1993	list^{[A]}
(6343) 1993 VK	7 November 1993	list^{[A]}
(6344) 1993 VM	7 November 1993	list^{[A]}
(6347) 1995 BM4	28 January 1995	list^{[A]}
(6348) 1995 CH1	3 February 1995	list^{[A]}
(6387) 1989 WC	19 November 1989	list^{[A]}

(6388) 1989 WL1	25 November 1989	list^{[A]}
(6415) 1993 VR3	11 November 1993	list^{[A]}
(6421) 1993 XS1	6 December 1993	list^{[A]}
(6425) 1994 WZ3	28 November 1994	list^{[A]}
(6427) 1995 FY	28 March 1995	list^{[A]}
(6495) 1992 UB1	19 October 1992	list^{[A]}
(6502) 1993 XR1	6 December 1993	list^{[A]}
(6503) 1994 CP	4 February 1994	list^{[A]}
(6513) 1987 UW1	28 October 1987	list^{[A]}
6568 Serendip	21 February 1993	list^{[A]}
6601 Schmeer	7 December 1988	list^{[A]}
(6609) 1992 BN	28 January 1992	list^{[A]}
(6662) 1993 BP13	22 January 1993	list^{[A]}
(6668) 1994 GY8	11 April 1994	list^{[A]}
(6724) 1991 CX5	4 February 1991	list^{[A]}
(6728) 1991 UM	18 October 1991	list^{[A]}
(6732) 1992 CG1	8 February 1992	list^{[A]}
(6733) 1992 EF	2 March 1992	list^{[A]}
6734 Benzenberg	23 March 1992	list^{[A]}
(6791) 1991 UC2	29 October 1991	list^{[A]}
(6803) 1995 UK7	27 October 1995	list^{[A]}
(6831) 1991 UM1	28 October 1991	list^{[A]}
(6840) 1995 WW5	18 November 1995	list^{[A]}
(6872) 1993 CN1	15 February 1993	list^{[A]}
6921 Janejacobs	14 May 1993	list^{[A]}

(6926) 1994 RO11	1 September 1994	list^{[A]}
(6930) 1994 VJ3	7 November 1994	list^{[A]}
(6934) 1994 YN2	25 December 1994	list^{[A]}
(6957) 1988 HA	16 April 1988	list^{[A]}
(6958) 1988 TX1	13 October 1988	list^{[A]}
(6968) 1991 VX3	11 November 1991	list^{[A]}
6973 Karajan	27 April 1992	list^{[A]}
(6985) 1994 UF2	31 October 1994	list^{[A]}
(6988) 1994 WE3	28 November 1994	list^{[A]}
(6993) 1995 BJ4	28 January 1995	list^{[A]}
(6994) 1995 BV4	28 January 1995	list^{[A]}
(7018) 1992 DF	25 February 1992	list^{[A]}
(7022) 1992 JN4	2 May 1992	list^{[A]}
(7033) 1994 WN2	28 November 1994	list^{[A]}
(7034) 1994 YT2	25 December 1994	list^{[A]}
7063 Johnmichell	18 October 1991	list^{[A]}
(7069) 1994 YG2	30 December 1994	list^{[A]}
(7070) 1994 YO2	25 December 1994	list^{[A]}
(7071) 1995 BH4	28 January 1995	list^{[A]}
(7089) 1992 FX1	23 March 1992	list^{[A]}
(7129) 1991 VE1	4 November 1991	list^{[A]}
(7138) 1994 AK15	15 January 1994	list^{[A]}
(7185) 1991 VN1	4 November 1991	list^{[A]}
(7243) 1990 VV3	12 November 1990	list^{[A]}
(7255) 1993 VY1	11 November 1993	list^{[A]}

(7282) 1989 BC	29 January 1989	list^{[A]}
7295 Brozovic	22 June 1992	list^{[A]}
(7302) 1993 CQ	10 February 1993	list^{[A]}
(7303) 1993 FS1	25 March 1993	list^{[A]}
(7312) 1996 AT3	13 January 1996	list^{[A]}
(7340) 1991 UA2	29 October 1991	list^{[A]}
(7347) 1993 EW	12 March 1993	list^{[A]}
(7352) 1994 CO	4 February 1994	list^{[A]}
(7357) 1995 UJ7	27 October 1995	list^{[A]}
(7405) 1988 FF	16 March 1988	list^{[A]}
(7406) 1988 TD	3 October 1988	list^{[A]}
(7407) 1988 TL	3 October 1988	list^{[A]}
(7444) 1996 TM10	9 October 1996	list^{[A]}
(7467) 1989 WQ1	25 November 1989	list^{[A]}
(7479) 1994 EC1	4 March 1994	list^{[A]}
(7503) 1996 VJ38	7 November 1996	list^{[A]}
(7535) 1995 WU2	16 November 1995	list^{[A]}
(7539) 1996 XS32	6 December 1996	list^{[A]}
(7540) 1997 AK21	9 January 1997	list^{[A]}
(7567) 1988 TC1	13 October 1988	list^{[A]}
(7591) 1992 WG3	18 November 1992	list^{[A]}
(7598) 1994 CS	4 February 1994	list^{[A]}
(7601) 1994 US1	25 October 1994	list^{[A]}
(7606) 1995 SV2	20 September 1995	list^{[A]}
(7612) 1996 CN2	12 February 1996	list^{[A]}

(7615) 1996 TA11	9 October 1996	list^{[A]}
(7617) 1996 VF30	7 November 1996	list^{[A]}
(7642) 1988 TZ	13 October 1988	list^{[A]}
(7653) 1991 UV	18 October 1991	list^{[A]}
(7654) 1991 VV3	11 November 1991	list^{[A]}
(7658) 1993 BM12	22 January 1993	list^{[A]}
(7659) 1993 CP1	15 February 1993	list^{[A]}
(7685) 1997 EP17	1 March 1997	list^{[A]}
7708 Fennimore	11 April 1994	list^{[A]}
(7751) 1988 UA	16 October 1988	list^{[A]}
7777 Consadole	15 February 1993	list^{[A]}
(7834) 1993 JL	14 May 1993	list^{[A]}
(7843) 1994 YE1	22 December 1994	list^{[A]}
(7875) 1991 ES1	7 March 1991	list^{[A]}
(7876) 1991 VW3	11 November 1991	list^{[A]}
(7930) 1987 VD	15 November 1987	list^{[A]}
(7951) 1992 WC2	18 November 1992	list^{[A]}
(7962) 1994 WG3	28 November 1994	list^{[A]}
8031 Williamdana	7 March 1992	list^{[A]}
8032 Michaeladams	8 March 1992	list^{[A]}
(8033) 1992 FY1	26 March 1992	list^{[A]}
(8042) 1994 AX2	12 January 1994	list^{[A]}
(8095) 1992 WS2	18 November 1992	list^{[A]}
(8105) 1994 WH2	28 November 1994	list^{[A]}
(8177) 1992 BO	28 January 1992	list^{[A]}

(8183) 1992 UE3	22 October 1992	list^{[A]}
8184 Luderic	16 November 1992	list^{[A]}
(8185) 1992 WR2	18 November 1992	list^{[A]}
(8198) 1993 VE2	11 November 1993	list^{[A]}
(8211) 1995 EB1	5 March 1995	list^{[A]}
(8285) 1991 UK3	31 October 1991	list^{[A]}
(8293) 1992 UQ	19 October 1992	list^{[A]}
(8352) 1989 GE	6 April 1989	list^{[A]}
(8359) 1989 WD	19 November 1989	list^{[A]}
(8372) 1991 VC2	9 November 1991	list^{[A]}
(8385) 1993 AN	13 January 1993	list^{[A]}
8410 Hiroakiohno	24 August 1996	list^{[A]}
8413 Kawakami	9 October 1996	list^{[A]}
8414 Atsuko	9 October 1996	list^{[A]}
8416 Okada	3 November 1996	list^{[A]}
8419 Terumikazumi	7 November 1996	list^{[A]}
(8504) 1990 YC	17 December 1990	list^{[A]}
(8505) 1990 YK	19 December 1990	list^{[A]}
(8508) 1991 CU1	14 February 1991	list^{[A]}
(8517) 1992 BB5	28 January 1992	list^{[A]}
(8542) 1993 VB2	11 November 1993	list^{[A]}
(8547) 1994 CQ	4 February 1994	list^{[A]}
(8570) 1996 TN10	9 October 1996	list^{[A]}
(8576) 1996 VN8	7 November 1996	list^{[A]}
(8645) 1988 TN	5 October 1988	list^{[A]}

(8646) 1988 TB1	13 October 1988	list^{[A]}
(8662) 1990 UT10	22 October 1990	list^{[A]}
(8674) 1991 VA1	4 November 1991	list^{[A]}
(8675) 1991 YZ	30 December 1991	list^{[A]}
(8692) 1992 WH	16 November 1992	list^{[A]}
(8694) 1993 CO	10 February 1993	list^{[A]}
(8727) 1996 VZ7	3 November 1996	list^{[A]}
(8840) 1989 WT	20 November 1989	list^{[A]}
(8848) 1990 VK1	12 November 1990	list^{[A]}
(8863) 1991 UV2	31 October 1991	list^{[A]}
(8908) 1995 WY6	18 November 1995	list^{[A]}
(8910) 1995 WV42	25 November 1995	list^{[A]}
(8920) 1996 VZ29	7 November 1996	list^{[A]}
(8921) 1996 VH30	7 November 1996	list^{[A]}
(8938) 1997 AF21	9 January 1997	list^{[A]}
(9051) 1991 UG3	31 October 1991	list^{[A]}
(9065) 1993 FN1	25 March 1993	list^{[A]}
(9086) 1995 SA3	20 September 1995	list^{[A]}
(9095) 1995 WT2	16 November 1995	list^{[A]}
(9169) 1988 TL1	13 October 1988	list^{[A]}
(9170) 1988 TG5	3 October 1988	list^{[A]}
(9192) 1992 AR1	14 January 1992	list^{[A]}
(9199) 1993 FO1	25 March 1993	list^{[A]}
(9209) 1994 UK1	25 October 1994	list^{[A]}
(9210) 1995 BW2	27 January 1995	list^{[A]}

(9213) 1995 UX5	21 October 1995	list^{[A]}
(9214) 1995 UC6	21 October 1995	list^{[A]}
(9311) 1987 UV1	25 October 1987	list^{[A]}
(9312) 1987 VE2	15 November 1987	list^{[A]}
(9324) 1989 CH4	7 February 1989	list^{[A]}
(9352) 1991 UB4	31 October 1991	list^{[A]}
(9354) 1991 VF7	11 November 1991	list^{[A]}
(9355) 1991 XO2	5 December 1991	list^{[A]}
(9363) 1992 GR	3 April 1992	list^{[A]}
(9402) 1994 UN1	25 October 1994	list^{[A]}
(9404) 1994 UQ11	26 October 1994	list^{[A]}
(9406) 1994 WG2	28 November 1994	list^{[A]}
(9412) 1995 GZ8	4 April 1995	list^{[A]}
(9597) 1991 UF	18 October 1991	list^{[A]}
(9598) 1991 UQ	18 October 1991	list^{[A]}
(9600) 1991 UB3	31 October 1991	list^{[A]}
(9601) 1991 UE3	18 October 1991	list^{[A]}
(9603) 1991 VG2	9 November 1991	list^{[A]}
(9606) 1992 BZ	28 January 1992	list^{[A]}
(9625) 1993 HF	16 April 1993	list^{[A]}
(9652) 1996 AF2	12 January 1996	list^{[A]}
(9659) 1996 EJ	10 March 1996	list^{[A]}
(9747) 1989 AT	4 January 1989	list^{[A]}
(9776) 1993 VL3	11 November 1993	list^{[A]}
(9779) 1994 RA11	1 September 1994	list^{[A]}

(9787) 1995 BA3	27 January 1995	list^{[A]}
(9789) 1995 GO7	4 April 1995	list^{[A]}
(9798) 1996 JK	8 May 1996	list^{[A]}
(9868) 1991 VP1	4 November 1991	list^{[A]}
(9889) 1995 FG1	28 March 1995	list^{[A]}
(9890) 1995 SY2	20 September 1995	list^{[A]}
(9953) 1991 EB	7 March 1991	list^{[A]}
(9958) 1991 VL1	4 November 1991	list^{[A]}
(9959) 1991 VF2	9 November 1991	list^{[A]}
(9961) 1991 XK	4 December 1991	list^{[A]}
(10077) 1989 UL1	26 October 1989	list^{[A]}
(10118) 1992 UK1	19 October 1992	list^{[A]}
10156 Darnley	7 November 1994	list^{[A]}
10196 Akiraarai	9 October 1996	list^{[A]}
(10225) 1997 VQ1	1 November 1997	list^{[A]}
(10228) 1997 VY8	1 November 1997	list^{[A]}
(10240) 1998 VW34	12 November 1998	list^{[A]}
(10329) 1991 GJ1	11 April 1991	list^{[A]}
(10360) 1993 VN	7 November 1993	list^{[A]}
(10362) 1994 UC2	31 October 1994	list^{[A]}
(10384) 1996 TQ10	9 October 1996	list^{[A]}
(10398) 1997 UP8	23 October 1997	list^{[A]}
(10406) 1997 WZ29	24 November 1997	list^{[A]}
(10517) 1990 BH1	28 January 1990	list^{[A]}
(10528) 1990 VX3	12 November 1990	list^{[A]}

(10530) 1991 EA	7 March 1991	list^{[A]}
(10539) 1991 VH4	9 November 1991	list^{[A]}
(10597) 1996 TR10	9 October 1996	list^{[A]}
(10599) 1996 TK15	9 October 1996	list^{[A]}
(10600) 1996 TK48	9 October 1996	list^{[A]}
(10752) 1989 WJ1	25 November 1989	list^{[A]}
(10772) 1990 YM	23 December 1990	list^{[A]}
(10788) 1991 UC	18 October 1991	list^{[A]}
(10790) 1991 XS	5 December 1991	list^{[A]}
(10833) 1993 VJ4	11 November 1993	list^{[A]}
(10842) 1994 UY1	31 October 1994	list^{[A]}
(10843) 1994 YF2	30 December 1994	list^{[A]}
(10846) 1995 AW2	2 January 1995	list^{[A]}
(10903) 1997 WA30	24 November 1997	list^{[A]}
(11044) 1990 DV	28 February 1990	list^{[A]}
(11053) 1991 CQ6	3 February 1991	list^{[A]}
(11068) 1992 EA	2 March 1992	list^{[A]}
(11077) 1992 WB2	18 November 1992	list^{[A]}
(11078) 1992 WH2	18 November 1992	list^{[A]}
(11116) 1996 EK	10 March 1996	list^{[A]}
(11125) 1996 TL10	9 October 1996	list^{[A]}
(11130) 1996 VA30	7 November 1996	list^{[A]}
(11131) 1996 VO30	7 November 1996	list^{[A]}
(11168) 1998 FO15	21 March 1998	list^{[A]}
(11276) 1988 TM1	13 October 1988	list^{[A]}

(11293) 1991 XL	4 December 1991	list^{[A]}
(11300) 1992 WG2	18 November 1992	list^{[A]}
(11347) 1997 AG21	9 January 1997	list^{[A]}
(11386) 1998 TA18	12 October 1998	list^{[A]}
(11391) 1998 VA35	12 November 1998	list^{[A]}
(11482) 1988 BW	25 January 1988	list^{[A]}
(11489) 1988 SN	22 September 1988	list^{[A]}
(11490) 1988 TE	3 October 1988	list^{[A]}
(11491) 1988 VT2	8 November 1988	list^{[A]}
(11502) 1989 WU2	21 November 1989	list^{[A]}
(11526) 1991 UL3	31 October 1991	list^{[A]}
(11529) 1992 BJ1	28 January 1992	list^{[A]}
(11536) 1992 FZ	26 March 1992	list^{[A]}
(11541) 1992 SY14	28 September 1992	list^{[A]}
(11555) 1993 CR1	15 February 1993	list^{[A]}
(11556) 1993 DV	21 February 1993	list^{[A]}
(11586) 1994 UA2	31 October 1994	list^{[A]}
(11587) 1994 UH2	31 October 1994	list^{[A]}
(11590) 1994 WH3	28 November 1994	list^{[A]}
(11594) 1995 HP	27 April 1995	list^{[A]}
(11617) 1996 CL2	12 February 1996	list^{[A]}
(11619) 1996 GG17	13 April 1996	list^{[A]}
(11629) 1996 VY29	7 November 1996	list^{[A]}
(11635) 1996 XQ32	6 December 1996	list^{[A]}
(11658) 1997 EQ17	1 March 1997	list^{[A]}

(11872) 1989 WR	20 November 1989	list^{[A]}
(11940) 1993 GR	15 April 1993	list^{[A]}
(11971) 1994 UJ2	31 October 1994	list^{[A]}
(11990) 1995 WM6	21 November 1995	list^{[A]}
(12000) 1996 CK2	12 February 1996	list^{[A]}
(12250) 1988 TT	13 October 1988	list^{[A]}
(12307) 1991 UA	18 October 1991	list^{[A]}
(12315) 1992 FA2	28 March 1992	list^{[A]}
(12333) 1992 WJ2	18 November 1992	list^{[A]}
12370 Kageyasu	11 April 1994	list^{[A]}
(12422) 1995 US8	27 October 1995	list^{[A]}
(12764) 1993 VA2	11 November 1993	list^{[A]}
(12765) 1993 VA3	11 November 1993	list^{[A]}
(13026) 1989 CX	7 February 1989	list^{[A]}
(13056) 1990 VN1	12 November 1990	list^{[A]}
(13075) 1991 UN1	28 October 1991	list^{[A]}
(13076) 1991 VT3	11 November 1991	list^{[A]}
(13095) 1992 WY1	18 November 1992	list^{[A]}
(13119) 1993 VD4	11 November 1993	list^{[A]}
(13136) 1994 UJ1	25 October 1994	list^{[A]}
(13137) 1994 UT1	26 October 1994	list^{[A]}
(13142) 1994 YM2	25 December 1994	list^{[A]}
(13165) 1995 WS1	16 November 1995	list^{[A]}
(13166) 1995 WU1	16 November 1995	list^{[A]}
(13364) 1998 UK20	20 October 1998	list^{[A]}

(13378) 1998 VF35	12 November 1998	list^{[A]}
(13502) 1987 WD	17 November 1987	list^{[A]}
(13518) 1990 VL1	12 November 1990	list^{[A]}
(13541) 1991 VP3	4 November 1991	list^{[A]}
(13548) 1992 ER1	8 March 1992	list^{[A]}
(13566) 1992 UM9	19 October 1992	list^{[A]}
(13611) 1994 UM1	25 October 1994	list^{[A]}
(13612) 1994 UQ1	25 October 1994	list^{[A]}
(13613) 1994 UA3	26 October 1994	list^{[A]}
(13632) 1995 WP8	18 November 1995	list^{[A]}
(13634) 1995 WY41	16 November 1995	list^{[A]}
(13639) 1996 EG2	10 March 1996	list^{[A]}
(13783) 1998 UJ20	20 October 1998	list^{[A]}
(13802) 1998 WR3	18 November 1998	list^{[A]}
(13971) 1991 UF1	18 October 1991	list^{[A]}
(13972) 1991 UN3	31 October 1991	list^{[A]}
(13973) 1991 UZ3	31 October 1991	list^{[A]}
(13985) 1992 UH3	22 October 1992	list^{[A]}
(13986) 1992 WA4	21 November 1992	list^{[A]}
(13987) 1992 WK9	16 November 1992	list^{[A]}
(14030) 1994 UP1	25 October 1994	list^{[A]}
(14038) 1995 HR	27 April 1995	list^{[A]}
(14368) 1988 TK	3 October 1988	list^{[A]}
(14369) 1988 UV	18 October 1988	list^{[A]}
(14375) 1989 SU	29 September 1989	list^{[A]}

(14410) 1991 RR1	7 September 1991	list^{[A]}
(14415) 1991 RQ7	13 September 1991	list^{[A]}
(14427) 1991 VJ2	9 November 1991	list^{[A]}
(14448) 1992 VQ	2 November 1992	list^{[A]}
(14450) 1992 WZ1	18 November 1992	list^{[A]}
(14451) 1992 WR5	27 November 1992	list^{[A]}
(14490) 1994 US2	31 October 1994	list^{[A]}
(14494) 1994 YJ2	30 December 1994	list^{[A]}
(14496) 1995 BK4	28 January 1995	list^{[A]}
(14503) 1995 WW42	25 November 1995	list^{[A]}
(14556) 1997 VN1	1 November 1997	list^{[A]}
(14633) 1998 VY34	12 November 1998	list^{[A]}
(14640) 1998 WF4	18 November 1998	list^{[A]}
(14641) 1998 WC6	18 November 1998	list^{[A]}
(14841) 1988 TU	13 October 1988	list^{[A]}
(14842) 1988 TN1	13 October 1988	list^{[A]}
(14844) 1988 VT3	14 November 1988	list^{[A]}
(14859) 1989 WU1	25 November 1989	list^{[A]}
(14903) 1993 DF2	25 February 1993	list^{[A]}
(14930) 1994 WL3	28 November 1994	list^{[A]}
(14950) 1996 BE2	18 January 1996	list^{[A]}
(14984) 1997 TN26	11 October 1997	list^{[A]}
(14997) 1997 VD4	1 November 1997	list^{[A]}
(15035) 1998 WS3	18 November 1998	list^{[A]}
(15154) 2000 FW30	27 March 2000	list^{[A]}

(15163) 2000 GB4	2 April 2000	list^{[A]}
(15247) 1989 WS	20 November 1989	list^{[A]}
(15291) 1991 VO1	4 November 1991	list^{[A]}
(15292) 1991 VD2	9 November 1991	list^{[A]}
(15293) 1991 VO3	4 November 1991	list^{[A]}
(15306) 1992 WK2	18 November 1992	list^{[A]}
(15349) 1994 UX1	31 October 1994	list^{[A]}
(15709) 1988 XH1	7 December 1988	list^{[A]}
(15754) 1992 EP	7 March 1992	list^{[A]}
(15823) 1994 UO1	25 October 1994	list^{[A]}
(15842) 1995 SX2	20 September 1995	list^{[A]}
(15871) 1996 QX1	24 August 1996	list^{[A]}
(15876) 1996 VO38	12 November 1996	list^{[A]}
(15942) 1997 YZ16	23 December 1997	list^{[A]}
(16420) 1987 UN1	28 October 1987	list^{[A]}
(16433) 1988 VX2	8 November 1988	list^{[A]}
(16457) 1989 VF	2 November 1989	list^{[A]}
(16461) 1990 BO	21 January 1990	list^{[A]}
(16554) 1991 UE2	29 October 1991	list^{[A]}
(16556) 1991 VQ1	4 November 1991	list^{[A]}
(16557) 1991 VE2	9 November 1991	list^{[A]}
(16571) 1992 EE	2 March 1992	list^{[A]}
(16579) 1992 GO	3 April 1992	list^{[A]}
(16600) 1993 DQ	21 February 1993	list^{[A]}
(16601) 1993 FQ1	25 March 1993	list^{[A]}

(16627) 1993 JK	14 May 1993	list^{[A]}
(16661) 1993 VS1	11 November 1993	list^{[A]}
(16662) 1993 VU1	11 November 1993	list^{[A]}
(16663) 1993 VG4	11 November 1993	list^{[A]}
(16721) 1995 WF3	16 November 1995	list^{[A]}
(16735) 1996 JJ	8 May 1996	list^{[A]}
(16762) 1996 TK10	9 October 1996	list^{[A]}
(16776) 1996 VA8	3 November 1996	list^{[A]}
(17432) 1989 SR	29 September 1989	list^{[A]}
(17490) 1991 UC3	31 October 1991	list^{[A]}
(17491) 1991 UM3	31 October 1991	list^{[A]}
(17513) 1992 UM	19 October 1992	list^{[A]}
(17514) 1992 UA1	19 October 1992	list^{[A]}
(17517) 1992 WZ3	21 November 1992	list^{[A]}
(17613) 1995 UP7	27 October 1995	list^{[A]}
(17621) 1995 WD1	16 November 1995	list^{[A]}
(17626) 1996 AG2	12 January 1996	list^{[A]}
(17661) 1996 VW7	3 November 1996	list^{[A]}
(17662) 1996 VG30	7 November 1996	list^{[A]}
(17663) 1996 VK30	7 November 1996	list^{[A]}
(17664) 1996 VP30	7 November 1996	list^{[A]}
(18378) 1991 UX2	31 October 1991	list^{[A]}
(18401) 1992 WE4	21 November 1992	list^{[A]}
(18459) 1995 FD1	28 March 1995	list^{[A]}
(18470) 1995 UX44	27 October 1995	list^{[A]}

(18487) 1996 AU3	13 January 1996	list^{[A]}
(18515) 1996 TL14	9 October 1996	list^{[A]}
(18525) 1996 VO8	7 November 1996	list^{[A]}
(18526) 1996 VB30	7 November 1996	list^{[A]}
(18527) 1996 VJ30	7 November 1996	list^{[A]}
(18652) 1998 FD15	21 March 1998	list^{[A]}
(18741) 1998 WB6	18 November 1998	list^{[A]}
(19211) 1993 DM	21 February 1993	list^{[A]}
(19256) 1994 WA4	28 November 1994	list^{[A]}
(19285) 1996 CM9	12 February 1996	list^{[A]}
(19305) 1996 TH10	9 October 1996	list^{[A]}
(19519) 1998 WB8	18 November 1998	list^{[A]}
(20018) 1991 UJ2	29 October 1991	list^{[A]}
(20039) 1992 WJ	16 November 1992	list^{[A]}
(20097) 1994 UL2	31 October 1994	list^{[A]}
(20099) 1994 WB3	28 November 1994	list^{[A]}
(20110) 1995 SS2	20 September 1995	list^{[A]}
(20154) 1996 TO10	9 October 1996	list^{[A]}
(20170) 1996 VM30	7 November 1996	list^{[A]}
(21019) 1988 VC2	2 November 1988	list^{[A]}
(21084) 1991 UV3	31 October 1991	list^{[A]}
(21085) 1991 UL4	18 October 1991	list^{[A]}
(21119) 1992 UJ	19 October 1992	list^{[A]}
(21165) 1993 VF2	11 November 1993	list^{[A]}
(21216) 1994 UZ1	31 October 1994	list^{[A]}

(21218) 1994 VP7	7 November 1994	list^{[A]}
(21242) 1995 WZ41	25 November 1995	list^{[A]}
(21253) 1996 AX3	13 January 1996	list^{[A]}
(21279) 1996 TS10	9 October 1996	list^{[A]}
(21297) 1996 VW29	7 November 1996	list^{[A]}
(21298) 1996 VX29	7 November 1996	list^{[A]}
(21597) 1998 WA8	18 November 1998	list^{[A]}
(22289) 1988 XV1	11 December 1988	list^{[A]}
(22298) 1990 EJ	2 March 1990	list^{[A]}
(22349) 1992 UH	19 October 1992	list^{[A]}
(22353) 1992 UA6	28 October 1992	list^{[A]}
(22408) 1995 SC3	20 September 1995	list^{[A]}
(22445) 1996 TT14	9 October 1996	list^{[A]}
(22452) 1996 VD8	3 November 1996	list^{[A]}
(23447) 1987 VG	15 November 1987	list^{[A]}
(23499) 1991 VY12	11 November 1991	list^{[A]}
(23518) 1992 SP1	20 September 1992	list^{[A]}
(23522) 1992 WC9	18 November 1992	list^{[A]}
(23523) 1993 AQ	13 January 1993	list^{[A]}
(23592) 1995 UB47	27 October 1995	list^{[A]}
(24668) 1988 TV	13 October 1988	list^{[A]}
(24669) 1988 VV	2 November 1988	list^{[A]}
(24670) 1988 VA5	14 November 1988	list^{[A]}
(24724) 1991 UN	18 October 1991	list^{[A]}
(24725) 1991 UD3	31 October 1991	list^{[A]}

(24727) 1991 VD1	4 November 1991	list^{[A]}
(24752) 1992 UN	19 October 1992	list^{[A]}
(24755) 1992 UQ6	28 October 1992	list^{[A]}
(24795) 1994 AC17	5 January 1994	list^{[A]}
(24815) 1994 VQ6	7 November 1994	list^{[A]}
(24831) 1995 SX4	21 September 1995	list^{[A]}
(24849) 1995 WQ41	16 November 1995	list^{[A]}
(25286) 1998 WC8	18 November 1998	list^{[A]}
(26093) 1987 UA1	25 October 1987	list^{[A]}
(26121) 1992 BX	28 January 1992	list^{[A]}
(26159) 1994 WN3	28 November 1994	list^{[A]}
(26824) 1988 TW1	13 October 1988	list^{[A]}
(26843) 1991 UK1	28 October 1991	list^{[A]}
(26847) 1992 DG	25 February 1992	list^{[A]}
(26854) 1992 WB	16 November 1992	list^{[A]}
(27111) 1998 VV34	12 November 1998	list^{[A]}
(27112) 1998 VC35	12 November 1998	list^{[A]}
(27768) 1991 UV1	29 October 1991	list^{[A]}
(27769) 1991 UA3	31 October 1991	list^{[A]}
(27770) 1991 VF1	4 November 1991	list^{[A]}
(27788) 1993 AS	13 January 1993	list^{[A]}
(27793) 1993 FL1	25 March 1993	list^{[A]}
(27828) 1994 AY2	12 January 1994	list^{[A]}
(27850) 1994 UD2	31 October 1994	list^{[A]}
(27860) 1995 BV2	27 January 1995	list^{[A]}

(27912) 1996 TJ14	9 October 1996	list^{[A]}
(29139) 1988 CP	15 February 1988	list^{[A]}
(29145) 1988 FE	16 March 1988	list^{[A]}
(29147) 1988 GG	11 April 1988	list^{[A]}
(29155) 1988 XE	2 December 1988	list^{[A]}
(29156) 1989 CH	3 February 1989	list^{[A]}
(29165) 1989 UK1	26 October 1989	list^{[A]}
(29215) 1991 UE	18 October 1991	list^{[A]}
(29217) 1991 VV12	4 November 1991	list^{[A]}
(29219) 1992 BJ	24 January 1992	list^{[A]}
(29228) 1992 EC	2 March 1992	list^{[A]}
(29253) 1993 DN	21 February 1993	list^{[A]}
(29254) 1993 FR1	25 March 1993	list^{[A]}
(29313) 1994 CR	4 February 1994	list^{[A]}
(29338) 1995 AV2	2 January 1995	list^{[A]}
(29422) 1997 AH21	9 January 1997	list^{[A]}
(29423) 1997 AF22	9 January 1997	list^{[A]}
(29480) 1997 VO1	1 November 1997	list^{[A]}
(30800) 1989 ST	29 September 1989	list^{[A]}
(30839) 1991 GH1	11 April 1991	list^{[A]}
(30853) 1991 UH3	31 October 1991	list^{[A]}
(30859) 1992 BM	28 January 1992	list^{[A]}
(30878) 1992 GQ	3 April 1992	list^{[A]}
(30887) 1992 WL2	18 November 1992	list^{[A]}
(30960) 1994 UV2	26 October 1994	list^{[A]}

(30976) 1995 FH1	28 March 1995	list^{[A]}
(31003) 1995 WQ2	16 November 1995	list^{[A]}
(31062) 1996 TP10	9 October 1996	list^{[A]}
(31073) 1996 VV29	7 November 1996	list^{[A]}
(31148) 1997 UO8	23 October 1997	list^{[A]}
(31425) 1999 BF3	16 January 1999	list^{[A]}
(32784) 1989 AR	4 January 1989	list^{[A]}
(32826) 1992 DC1	26 February 1992	list^{[A]}
(32845) 1992 FU1	26 March 1992	list^{[A]}
(32942) 1995 UD7	27 October 1995	list^{[A]}
(35063) 1988 FD	16 March 1988	list^{[A]}
(35109) 1991 XM	4 December 1991	list^{[A]}
(35145) 1993 AM	13 January 1993	list^{[A]}
(35186) 1993 VV1	11 November 1993	list^{[A]}
(35187) 1993 VW1	11 November 1993	list^{[A]}
(35188) 1993 VP3	11 November 1993	list^{[A]}
(35375) 1997 VP1	1 November 1997	list^{[A]}
(35684) 1999 BO5	16 January 1999	list^{[A]}
(37564) 1988 TR3	13 October 1988	list^{[A]}
(37593) 1991 UJ	18 October 1991	list^{[A]}
(37595) 1991 UZ1	29 October 1991	list^{[A]}
(37639) 1993 VR1	11 November 1993	list^{[A]}
(37740) 1996 VU29	7 November 1996	list^{[A]}
(39634) 1994 WM2	28 November 1994	list^{[A]}
(39665) 1995 WU6	16 November 1995	list^{[A]}

(39701) 1996 TF10	9 October 1996	list^{[A]}
(39702) 1996 TZ10	9 October 1996	list^{[A]}
(39704) 1996 TG15	9 October 1996	list^{[A]}
(39709) 1996 TH48	9 October 1996	list^{[A]}
(39722) 1996 VY7	3 November 1996	list^{[A]}
(42483) 1990 VM1	12 November 1990	list^{[A]}
(42502) 1993 CS1	10 February 1993	list^{[A]}
(42560) 1996 VL30	7 November 1996	list^{[A]}
(43771) 1988 TJ	3 October 1988	list^{[A]}
(43772) 1988 TV1	13 October 1988	list^{[A]}
(43814) 1991 UE1	18 October 1991	list^{[A]}
(43826) 1992 UC6	28 October 1992	list^{[A]}
(43874) 1994 VZ6	7 November 1994	list^{[A]}
(43905) 1995 WC1	16 November 1995	list^{[A]}
(43920) 1996 CJ2	12 February 1996	list^{[A]}
(46571) 1991 VG1	4 November 1991	list^{[A]}
(46587) 1992 UJ1	22 October 1992	list^{[A]}
(46635) 1994 WK2	28 November 1994	list^{[A]}
(46636) 1994 WD3	28 November 1994	list^{[A]}
(46639) 1995 BN4	28 January 1995	list^{[A]}
(46641) 1995 EY	5 March 1995	list^{[A]}
(46992) 1998 TZ17	12 October 1998	list^{[A]}
(48423) 1988 WA	17 November 1988	list^{[A]}
(48439) 1989 WR2	20 November 1989	list^{[A]}
(48474) 1991 UR	18 October 1991	list^{[A]}

(48475) 1991 UD2	29 October 1991	list^{[A]}
(48476) 1991 UP3	31 October 1991	list^{[A]}
(48479) 1991 XF	4 December 1991	list^{[A]}
(48493) 1992 WG	16 November 1992	list^{[A]}
(48494) 1992 WM	16 November 1992	list^{[A]}
(48596) 1994 VY6	7 November 1994	list^{[A]}
(48609) 1995 DE14	19 February 1995	list^{[A]}
(48644) 1995 UG7	27 October 1995	list^{[A]}
(48647) 1995 UT8	27 October 1995	list^{[A]}
(48658) 1995 WT1	16 November 1995	list^{[A]}
(49345) 1998 WH4	18 November 1998	list^{[A]}
(52343) 1992 WX1	18 November 1992	list^{[A]}
(52470) 1995 ST2	20 September 1995	list^{[A]}
(52533) 1996 TJ10	9 October 1996	list^{[A]}
(52540) 1996 TJ48	9 October 1996	list^{[A]}
(52634) 1997 WR28	24 November 1997	list^{[A]}
(53022) 1998 VU44	12 November 1998	list^{[A]}
(53030) 1998 WC7	18 November 1998	list^{[A]}
(55738) 1988 VG3	14 November 1988	list^{[A]}
(58219) 1992 WZ2	18 November 1992	list^{[A]}
(58333) 1994 UL1	25 October 1994	list^{[A]}
(58626) 1997 VF5	1 November 1997	list^{[A]}
(59096) 1998 WT3	18 November 1998	list^{[A]}
(65687) 1990 VO1	12 November 1990	list^{[A]}
(65713) 1992 UQ1	19 October 1992	list^{[A]}

(65714) 1992 VR	2 November 1992	list^{[A]}
(65715) 1992 WV1	16 November 1992	list^{[A]}
(65765) 1994 UR1	25 October 1994	list^{[A]}
(69377) 1994 WJ3	28 November 1994	list^{[A]}
(69418) 1995 WX42	25 November 1995	list^{[A]}
(69942) 1998 UC31	25 October 1998	list^{[A]}
(69962) 1998 VX34	12 November 1998	list^{[A]}
(69976) 1998 WD6	18 November 1998	list^{[A]}
(73675) 1988 CF	8 February 1988	list^{[A]}
(73678) 1988 TY	13 October 1988	list^{[A]}
(73708) 1992 DV	25 February 1992	list^{[A]}
(73855) 1996 VE30	7 November 1996	list^{[A]}
(74354) 1998 WA6	18 November 1998	list^{[A]}
(79206) 1993 VX1	11 November 1993	list^{[A]}
(79299) 1995 WS2	16 November 1995	list^{[A]}
(79827) 1998 WU3	18 November 1998	list^{[A]}
(85191) 1991 RP4	7 September 1991	list^{[A]}
(85415) 1996 VE38	3 November 1996	list^{[A]}
(90776) 1993 VW2	11 November 1993	list^{[A]}
(90829) 1995 UY5	21 October 1995	list^{[A]}
(91022) 1998 DV31	19 February 1998	list^{[A]}
(96181) 1988 VW2	8 November 1988	list^{[A]}
(100011) 1988 VE3	11 November 1988	list^{[A]}
(134363) 1994 VG3	7 November 1994	list^{[A]}
(136829) 1997 SL_{32}	30 September 1997	list^{[A]}

important;
(150113) 1991 VX4	4 November 1991	list^{[A]}
(150138) 1995 WR1	16 November 1995	list^{[A]}
(155370) 1988 TX	13 October 1988	list^{[A]}
(181703) 1988 TS	13 October 1988	list^{[A]}
(181706) 1991 UY3	31 October 1991	list^{[A]}
Co-discovery made with:^{A} S. Ueda
